= Baldock House =

Historic house in Arkansas, United States

- U.S. National Register of Historic Places
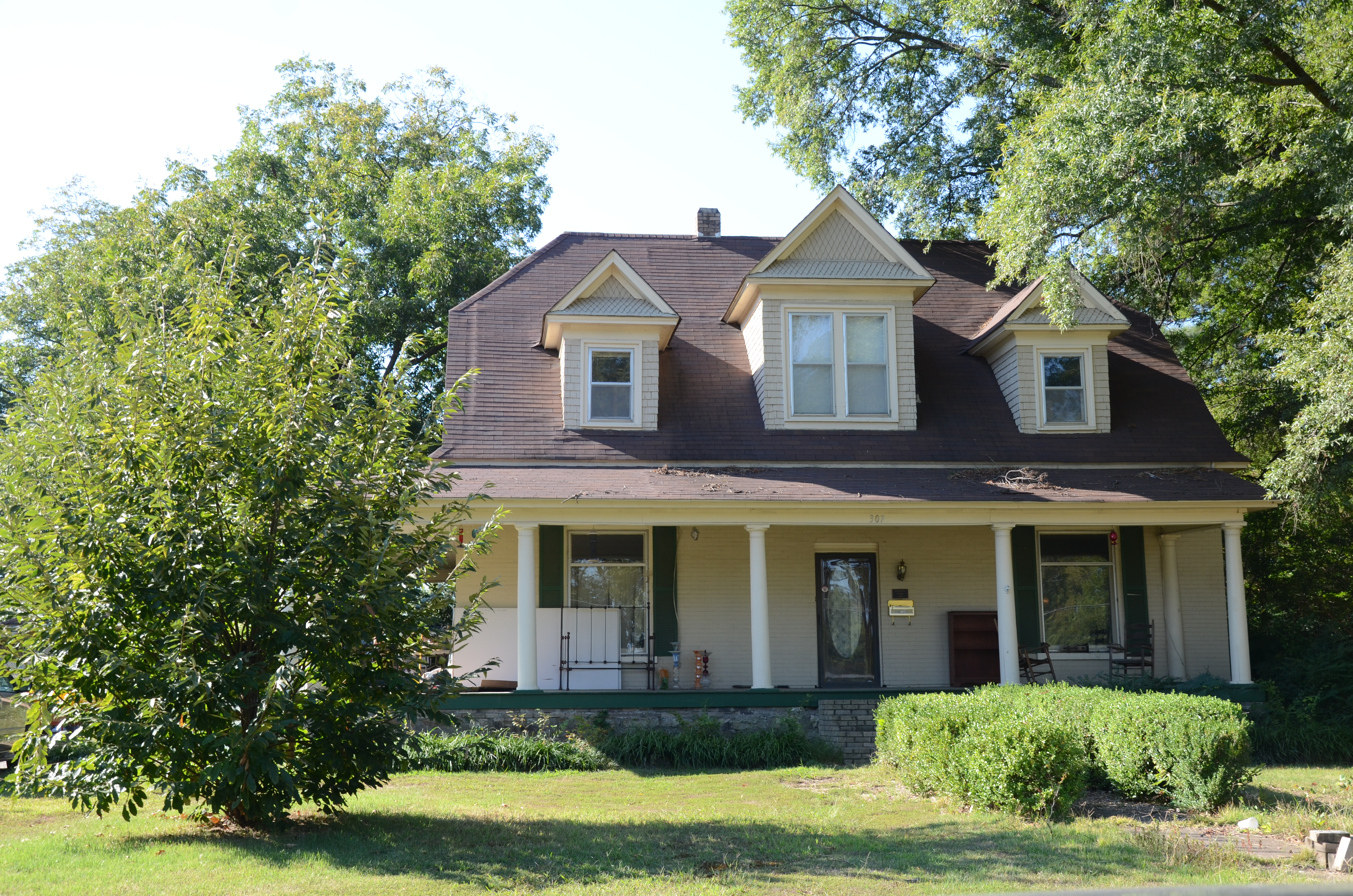

- Location within Arkansas Location within the United States
- Location: Jct. of S. Elm St. and W. Woodruff Ave., Searcy, Arkansas
- Coordinates: 35°14′45″N 91°44′25″W
- Area: less than one acre
- Built: 1910
- Architectural style: Vernacular irregular plan
- MPS: White County MPS
- NRHP reference No.: 91001239
- Added to NRHP: September 5, 1991

The Baldock House is a historic house at the southeast corner of South Elm Street and Woodruff Avenue in Searcy, Arkansas. It is a 1 1/2-story brick building with a clipped-gable roof and a full-width porch that wraps around to the east side. The northern (front) slope of the roof is pierced by three pedimented gable-roof dormers, the central one larger and housing two sash windows. Built c. 1910, this is house is one of six brick houses to survive from the early 20th century in White County.

The house was listed on the National Register of Historic Places in 1991.

== See also ==
- National Register of Historic Places listings in White County, Arkansas
