= Dr. James House =

Historic house in Arkansas, United States

- U.S. National Register of Historic Places
- Location within Arkansas Location within the United States
- Location: Jct. of W. Center and S. Gum Sts., Searcy, Arkansas
- Coordinates: 35°14′55″N 91°44′22″W
- Area: less than one acre
- Built: 1880
- Architectural style: Vernacular irregular plan
- MPS: White County MPS
- NRHP reference No.: 91001241
- Added to NRHP: September 13, 1991

The Dr. James House was a historic house at West Center and South Gum Streets in Searcy, Arkansas. It was a two-story brick building, with a gabled roof and a brick foundation. A shed-roofed porch extended around its front and side, supported by square posts. It was built about 1880, and was one of a modest number of houses surviving in the city from that period when it was listed on the National Register of Historic Places in 1991. The house has been reported as demolished to the Arkansas Historic Preservation Program, and is in the process of being delisted.

== See also ==
- National Register of Historic Places listings in White County, Arkansas
