= Joiner House =

Historic house in Arkansas, United States

- U.S. National Register of Historic Places
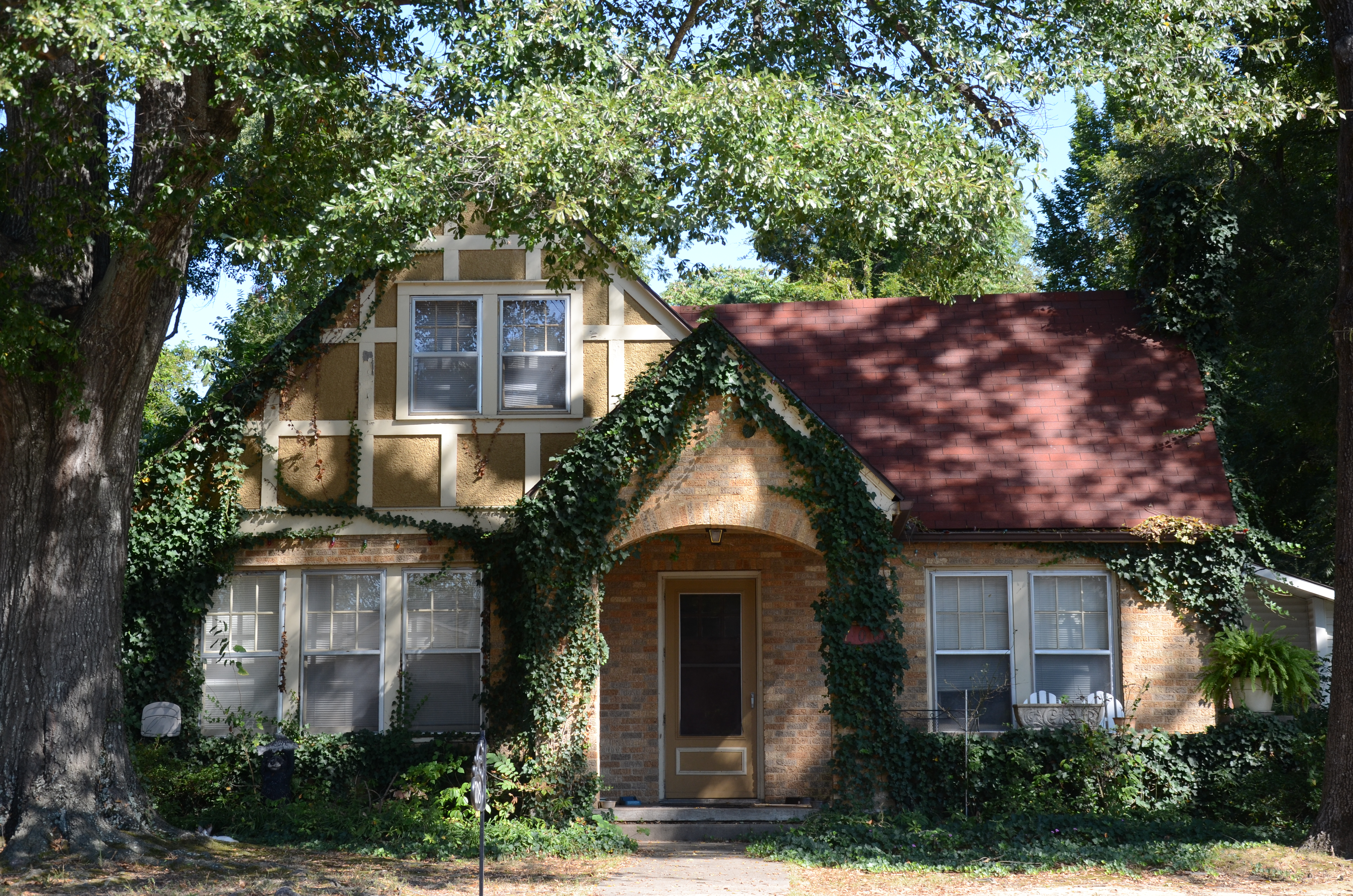

- Location within Arkansas Location within the United States
- Location: 708 Market St., Searcy, Arkansas
- Coordinates: 35°14′59″N 91°43′45″W
- Area: less than one acre
- Built: 1928
- Architectural style: Late 19th And 20th Century Revivals, English Revival
- MPS: White County MPS
- NRHP reference No.: 91001214
- Added to NRHP: July 22, 1992

The Joiner House is a historic house at 708 Market Street in Searcy, Arkansas. It is a 1 1/2-story brick structure, with asymmetrical massing characteristic of the English Revival architecture. A side gable roof has a large front-projecting gable with half-timbered stucco exterior, and the centered entrance is sheltered by a projecting brick gabled portico. Built in 1928, it is the oldest of Searcy's English Revival houses, and among its most picturesque.

The house was listed on the National Register of Historic Places in 1992.

== See also ==
- National Register of Historic Places listings in White County, Arkansas
