= Hicks-Dugan-Deener House =

Historic house in Arkansas, United States

- U.S. National Register of Historic Places
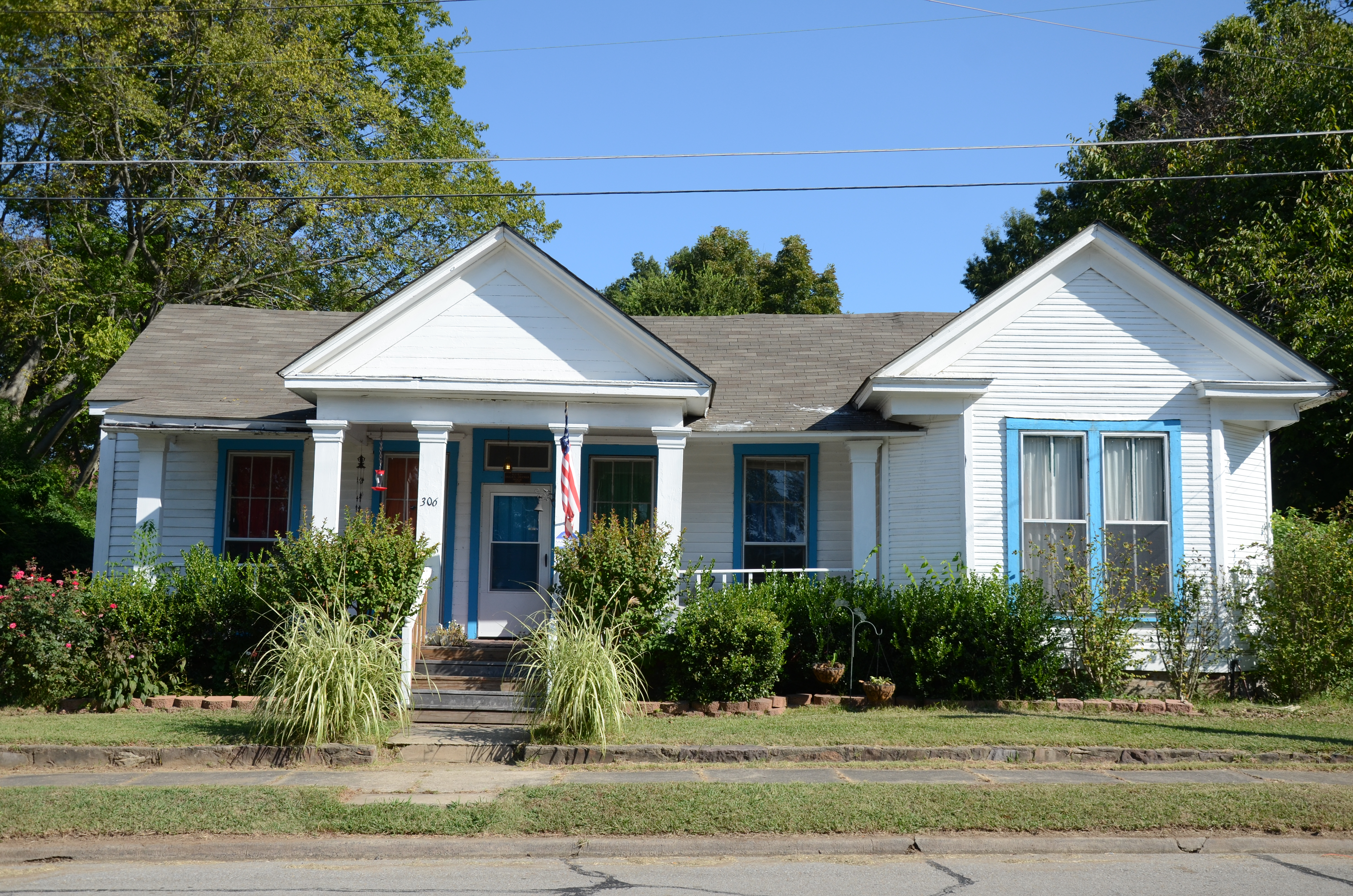

- Location within Arkansas Location within the United States
- Location: 306 E. Center St., Searcy, Arkansas
- Coordinates: 35°14′54″N 91°43′51″W
- Area: less than one acre
- Built: 1855
- Architectural style: Greek Revival
- NRHP reference No.: 85000835
- Added to NRHP: April 18, 1985

The Hicks-Dugan-Deener House is a historic house at 306 E. Center St. in Searcy, Arkansas. It is a single story wood-frame structure, with a side gable roof, a cross-gable projecting section at the right side, and a four-column Greek Revival gable-topped entrance portico. Built about 1855, it is one of Searcy's few surviving pre-Civil War houses. Its first owner, William Hicks, was the son of one of Searcy's first lawyers, Howell Hicks, and served as a lawyer and state representative. Walter Dugan, the next owner, was a prominent local businessman, owning the local telephone company.

The house was listed on the U.S. National Register of Historic Places in 1985.

== See also ==
- National Register of Historic Places listings in White County, Arkansas
