= Shue House =

Historic house in Arkansas, United States

- U.S. National Register of Historic Places
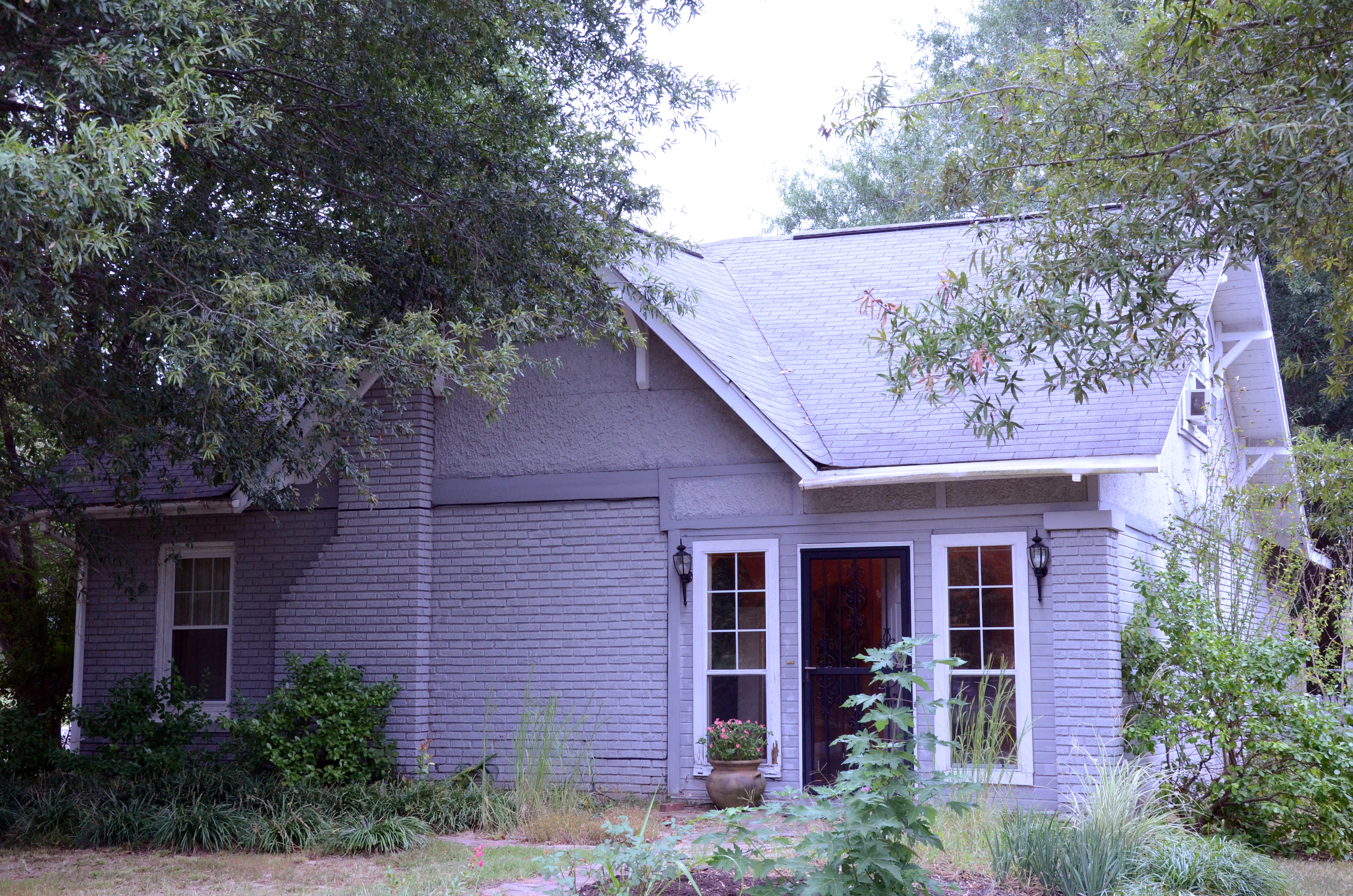

- Location within Arkansas Location within the United States
- Location: 108 Holly St., Beebe, Arkansas
- Coordinates: 35°4′8″N 91°53′18″W
- Area: less than one acre
- Built: 1935
- Architectural style: Bungalow/craftsman
- MPS: White County MPS
- NRHP reference No.: 91001257
- Added to NRHP: September 5, 1991

The Shue House is a historic house at 108 Holly Street in Beebe, Arkansas. It is a storey and a half wood-frame structure, finished in brick, with a cross-gable roof and a brick foundation. A gabled wall dormer features a half-timbered stucco exterior, and large knee brackets. The house, built in 1935 by the owner of a local oil company, is one of the city's best examples of late Craftsman architecture.

The house was listed on the National Register of Historic Places in 1991.

== See also ==
- National Register of Historic Places listings in White County, Arkansas
