= Arthur W. Hoofman House =

Historic house in Arkansas, United States

- U.S. National Register of Historic Places
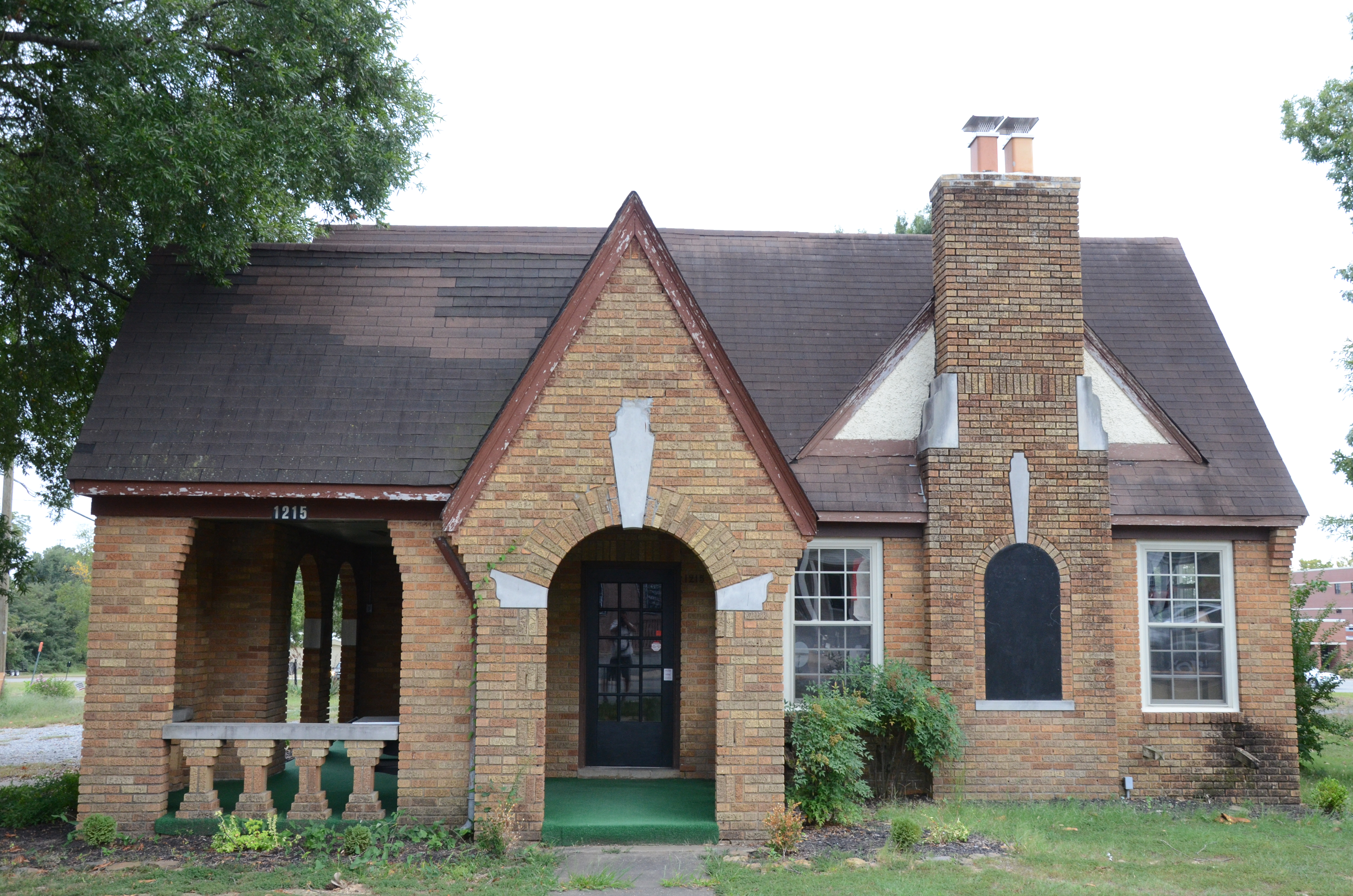

- Location within Arkansas Location within the United States
- Location: Jct. of E. Race and N. Cross Sts., Searcy, Arkansas
- Coordinates: 35°15′1″N 91°43′24″W
- Area: less than one acre
- Built: 1931
- Architect: Mr. Kayler
- Architectural style: Late 19th And 20th Century Revivals, English Revival
- MPS: White County MPS
- NRHP reference No.: 91001184
- Added to NRHP: July 22, 1992

The Arthur W. Hoofman House is a historic house at North Cross and East Race Streets in Searcy, Arkansas. It is a 1 1/2-story brick structure, with a side-facing gable roof that has a half-timbered gable end. The massing of the house is complex, with a variety of dormer and gable shapes, and a wraparound porch recessed under the roof, supported by an arcade of brick piers. The house, built in 1931 for a strawberry grower, is the city's finest example of high style English Revival architecture.

The house was listed on the National Register of Historic Places in 1992.

== See also ==
- National Register of Historic Places listings in White County, Arkansas
