= Hassell House =

Historic house in Arkansas, United States

- U.S. National Register of Historic Places
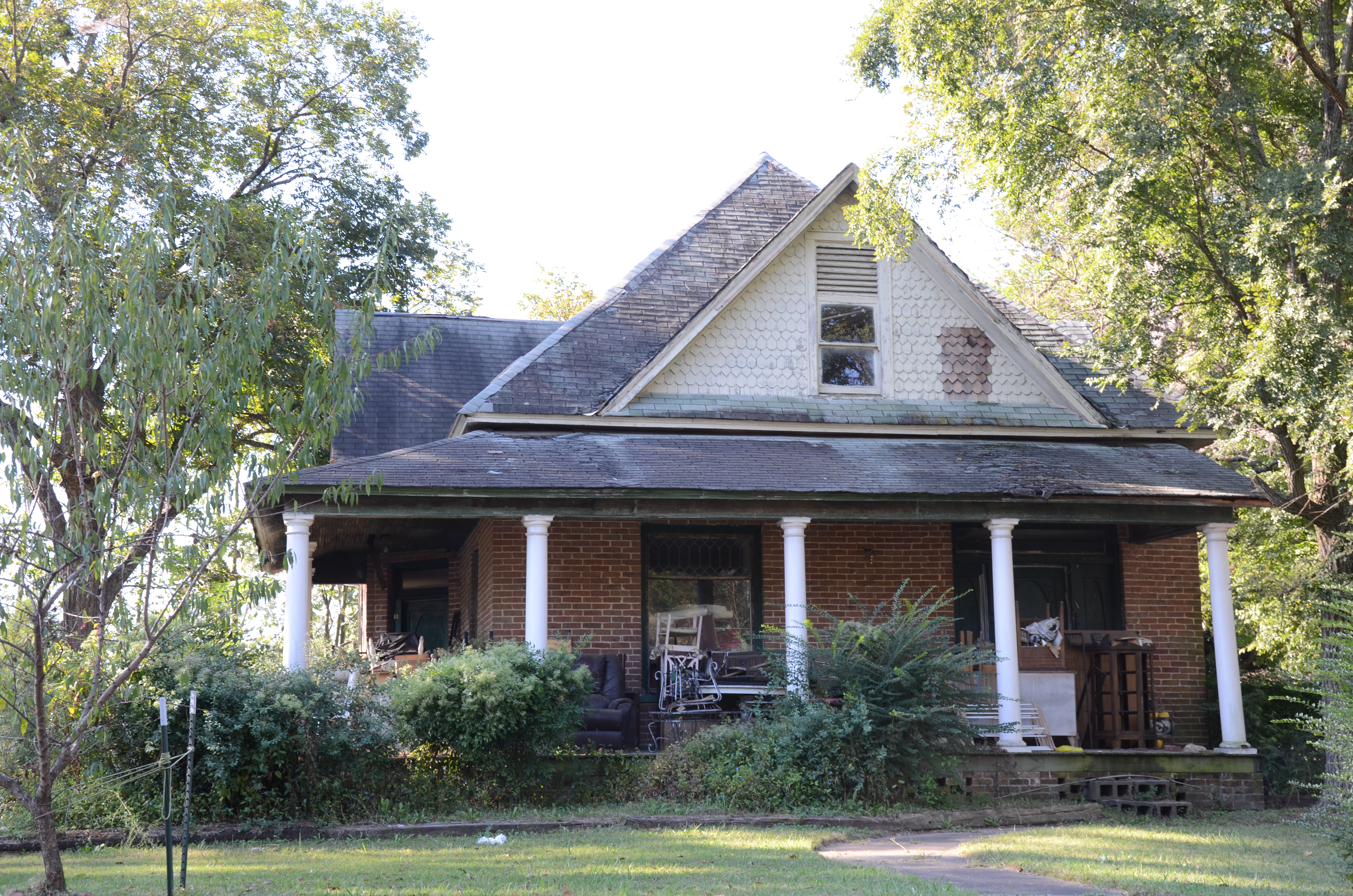

- Location within Arkansas Location within the United States
- Location: Jct. of S. Elm St. and W. Woodruff Ave., Searcy, Arkansas
- Coordinates: 35°14′45″N 91°44′27″W
- Area: less than one acre
- Built: 1910
- Architectural style: Vernacular irregular-plan
- MPS: White County MPS
- NRHP reference No.: 91001205
- Added to NRHP: September 5, 1991

The Hassell House is a historic house at South Elm and West Woodruff Streets in Searcy, Arkansas. It is a 1 1/2-story brick structure, with a hip roof that slopes down to gable sections. A porch extends around the main (north-facing) elevation to the east side, with Doric columns supporting it. Built about 1910, it is a rare surviving example in the town of a brick house from this period.

The House was listed on the National Register of Historic Places in 1991.

== See also ==
- National Register of Historic Places listings in White County, Arkansas
