= Moore House (Searcy, Arkansas) =

Historic house in Arkansas, United States

- Formerly listed on the U.S. National Register of Historic Places
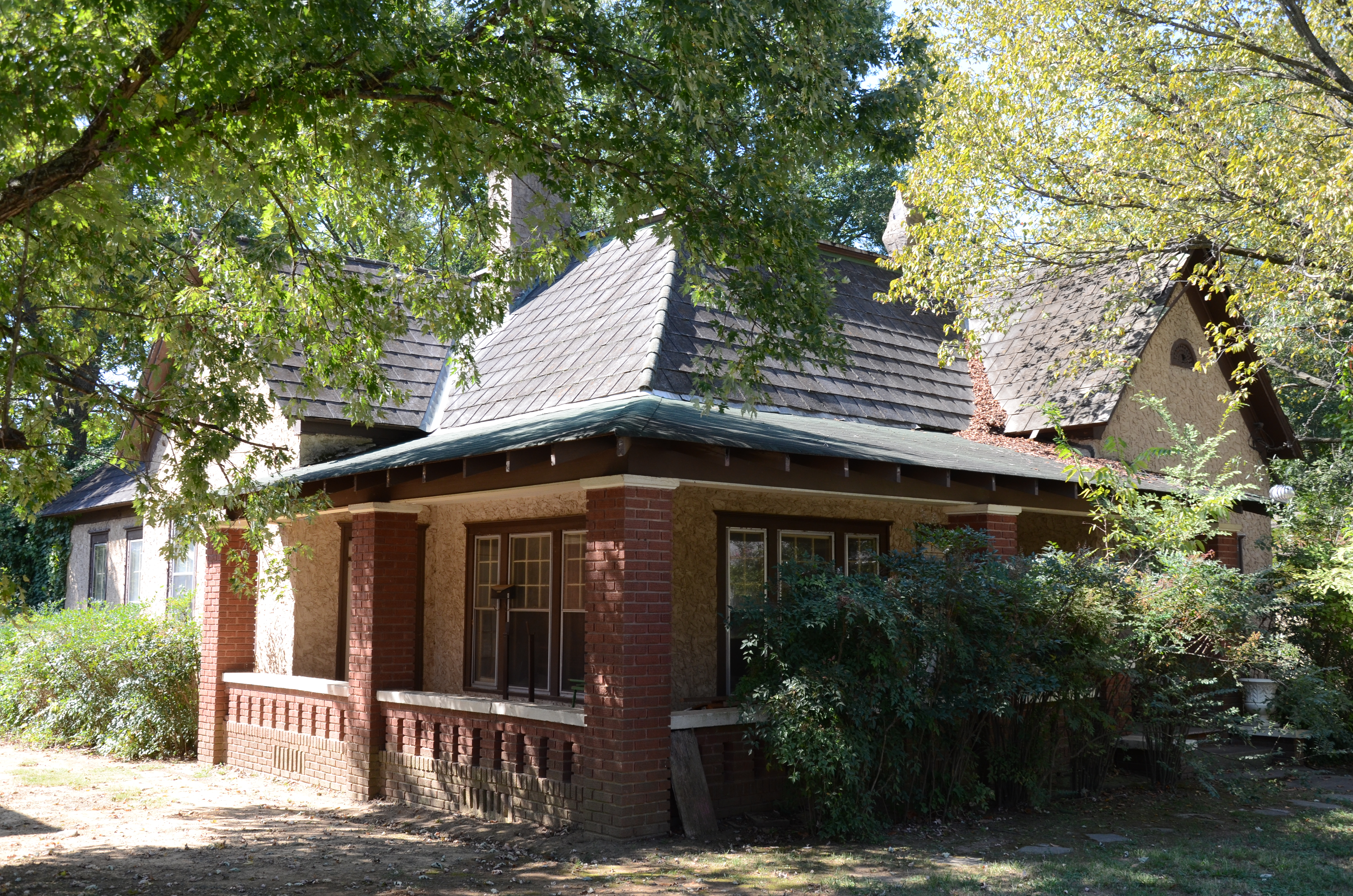

- Location within Arkansas Location within the United States
- Location: 405 Center St., Searcy, Arkansas
- Coordinates: 35°14′54″N 91°44′27″W
- Area: less than one acre
- Built: 1925
- Architectural style: Bungalow/craftsman, Late Victorian, Victorian Vernacular
- MPS: White County MPS
- NRHP reference No.: 91001210

Significant dates
- Added to NRHP: September 13, 1991
- Removed from NRHP: January 3, 2022

The Moore House is a historic house at 405 Center Street in Searcy, Arkansas. It is a 1 1/2-story stuccoed wood-frame structure, with a picturesque combination of Folk Victorian and Craftsman stylistic elements. It has a hipped roof topped by a flat deck, with several projecting gables, and stuccoed chimneys. A porch extends across part of the front and side, supported by brick posts. It was built about 1925, and represents an unusual late instance of the Folk Victorian style.

The house was listed on the National Register of Historic Places in 1991, and was delisted in 2022.

== See also ==
- National Register of Historic Places listings in White County, Arkansas
