= Mayfair Hotel (Searcy, Arkansas) =

- U.S. National Register of Historic Places
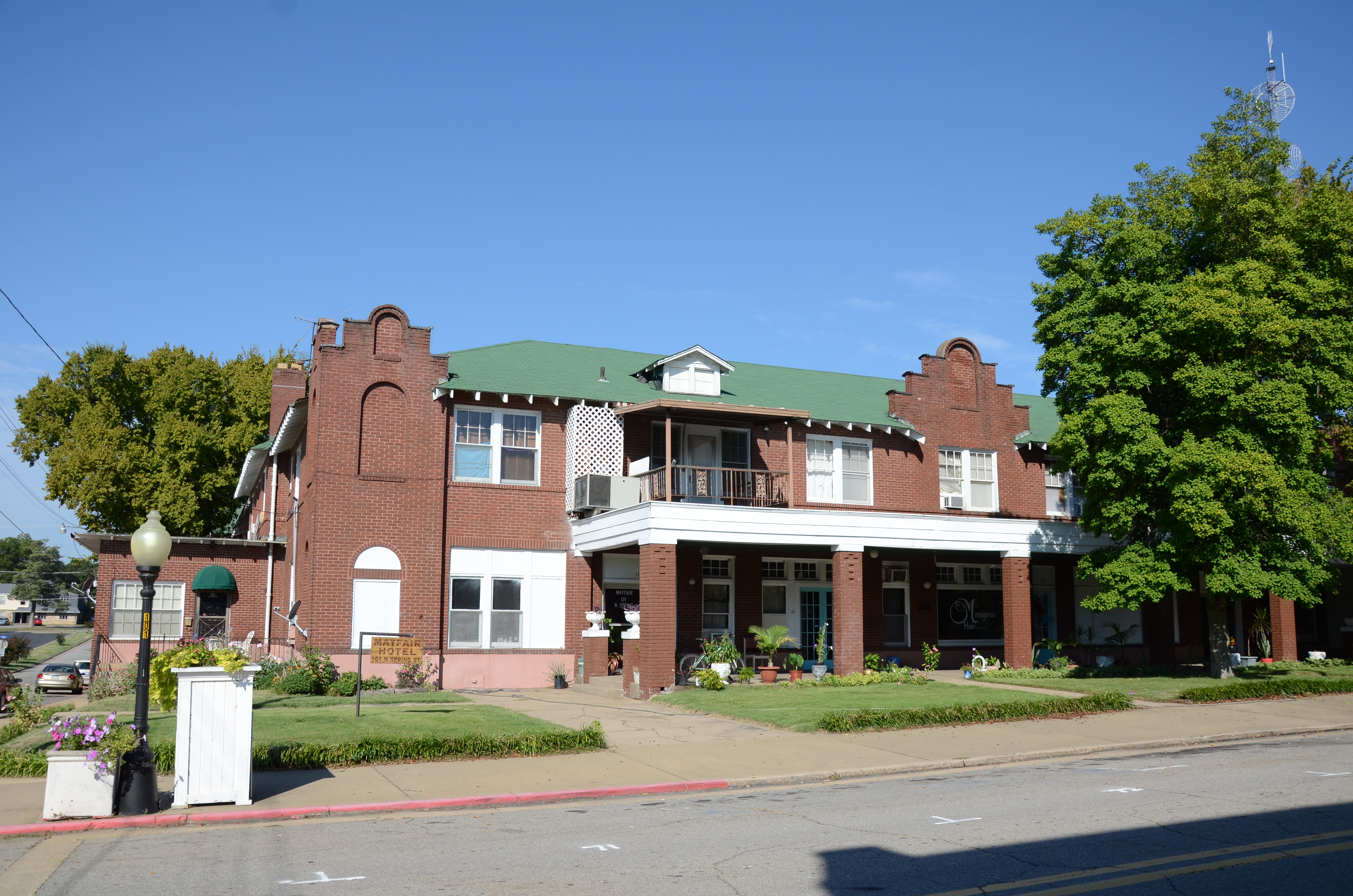

- Location within Arkansas Location within the United States
- Location: Jct. of Spring and Center Sts., Searcy, Arkansas
- Coordinates: 35°14′56″N 91°44′16″W
- Area: less than one acre
- Built: 1924
- Architectural style: Mission/Spanish Revival
- MPS: White County MPS
- NRHP reference No.: 91001242
- Added to NRHP: September 5, 1991

The Mayfair Hotel is a historic building at Spring and Center Streets in Searcy, Arkansas. It is an L-shaped two story brick building, with Spanish Revival styling. It has a hip roof with stepped wall dormers and exposed rafter ends in the eaves, and a corner tower with a similar stepped parapet. Built in 1924, it is the only historically non-residential Spanish Revival building in White County. It has been converted into a multiunit apartment house.

The building was listed on the National Register of Historic Places in 1991.

== See also ==
- National Register of Historic Places listings in White County, Arkansas
