= Cremane House =

Historic house in Arkansas, United States

- Formerly listed on the U.S. National Register of Historic Places
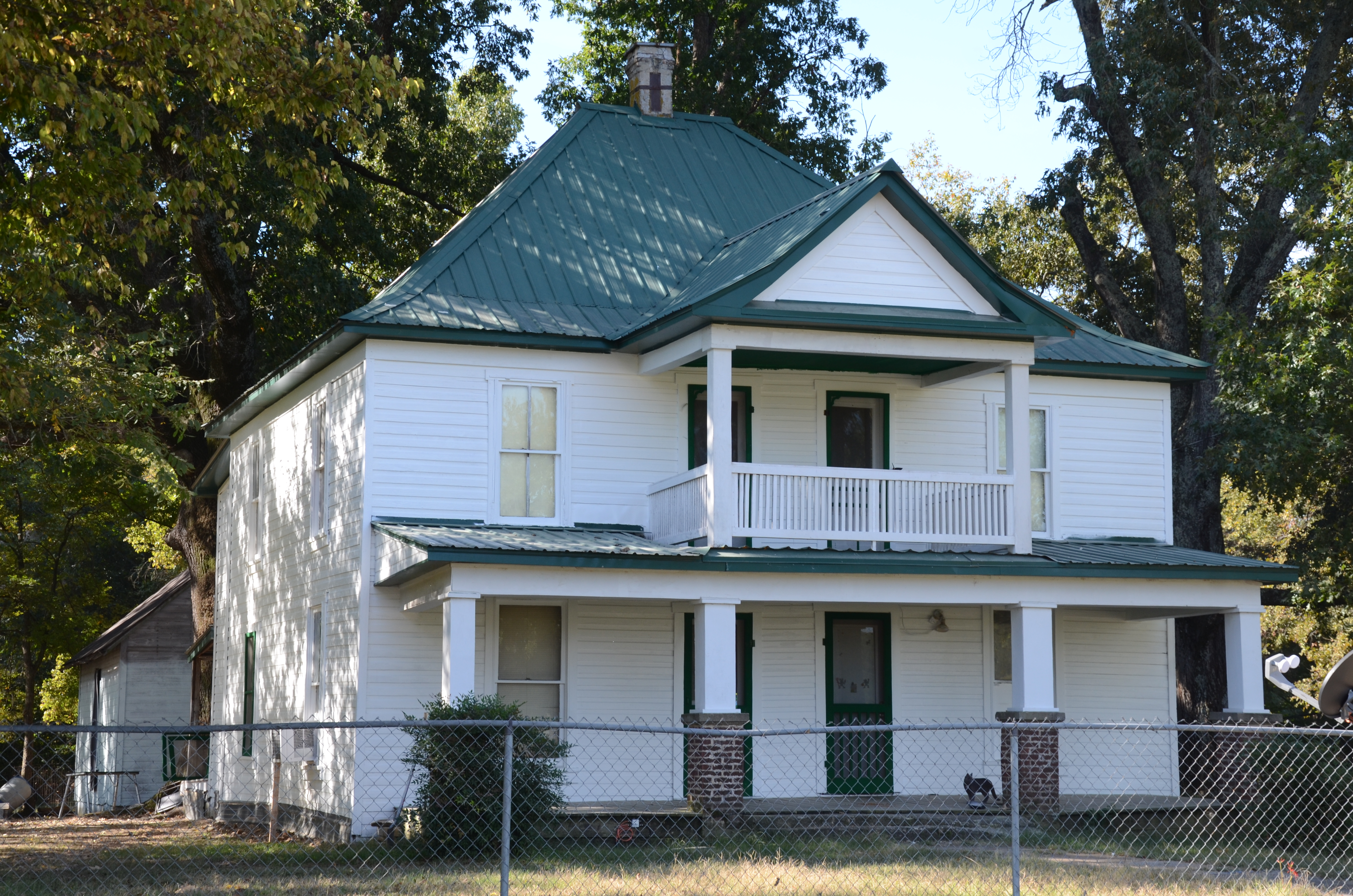

- Location within Arkansas Location within the United States
- Location: Co. Rd. 95 W of Bradford Lake, Bradford, Arkansas
- Coordinates: 35°25′1″N 91°26′19″W
- Area: 2 acres (0.81 ha)
- Built: 1910
- Architectural style: Vernacular double pile
- MPS: White County MPS
- NRHP reference No.: 91001320

Significant dates
- Added to NRHP: July 10, 1992
- Removed from NRHP: May 5, 2025

The Cremane House is a historic house in White County, Arkansas. It is located on the south side of County Road 95 (Lake Road), about 1 mile (1.6 km) southeast of Bradford. It is a two-story wood frame double-pile structure, with a bellcast roof and novelty siding. It was built c. 1910, and is one of a small number of vernacular houses to survive in the county from this period.

The house was listed on the National Register of Historic Places in 1992, and was delisted in 2025.

== See also ==
- National Register of Historic Places listings in White County, Arkansas
