= Joe Emmer House =

Historic house in Arkansas, United States

- U.S. National Register of Historic Places
- Location within Arkansas Location within the United States
- Nearest city: Holly Springs, Arkansas
- Coordinates: 35°21′36″N 91°45′29″W
- Area: less than one acre
- Built: 1890
- Architectural style: Vernacular log construction
- MPS: White County MPS
- NRHP reference No.: 91001327
- Added to NRHP: July 12, 1992

The Joe Emmer House was a historic house in rural northern White County, Arkansas. It was located on County Road 47, northwest of the Holly Springs Church. It was a single-story single-pen log structure, with a side gable roof and a shed-roof porch across the front. The logs were hand-hewn and joined by dovetailed notches. A frame addition extended the building to the west. The house was built c. 1890, and was one of about thirty such houses remaining in the county.

The house was listed on the National Register of Historic Places in 1992. It has been listed as destroyed in the Arkansas Historic Preservation Program database.

== See also ==
- National Register of Historic Places listings in White County, Arkansas
