= Dr. Emmett Snipes House =

Historic house in Arkansas, United States

- U.S. National Register of Historic Places
- Location within Arkansas Location within the United States
- Location: Jct. of E. Market and N. Locust Sts., Searcy, Arkansas
- Coordinates: 35°14′59″N 91°44′5″W
- Area: less than one acre
- Built: 1900
- Architectural style: Vernacular Folk Victorian
- MPS: White County MPS
- NRHP reference No.: 91001243
- Added to NRHP: September 5, 1991

The Dr. Emmett Snipes House was a historic house at South Market and North Locust Streets in Searcy, Arkansas. It was a 1 1/2-story wood-frame structure, with Folk Victorian styling and Colonial Revival elements. It had a wraparound porch with turned posts and jigsawn brackets, and applied Stick style detailing on the exterior gables. It was built c. 1900 for Dr. Emmett Snipes, a prominent local druggist who also served as mayor of Searcy for two years.

The house was listed on the National Register of Historic Places in 1991. It has been listed as destroyed in the Arkansas Historic Preservation Program database.

== See also ==
- National Register of Historic Places listings in White County, Arkansas
