= Robertson Drugstore =

- U.S. National Register of Historic Places
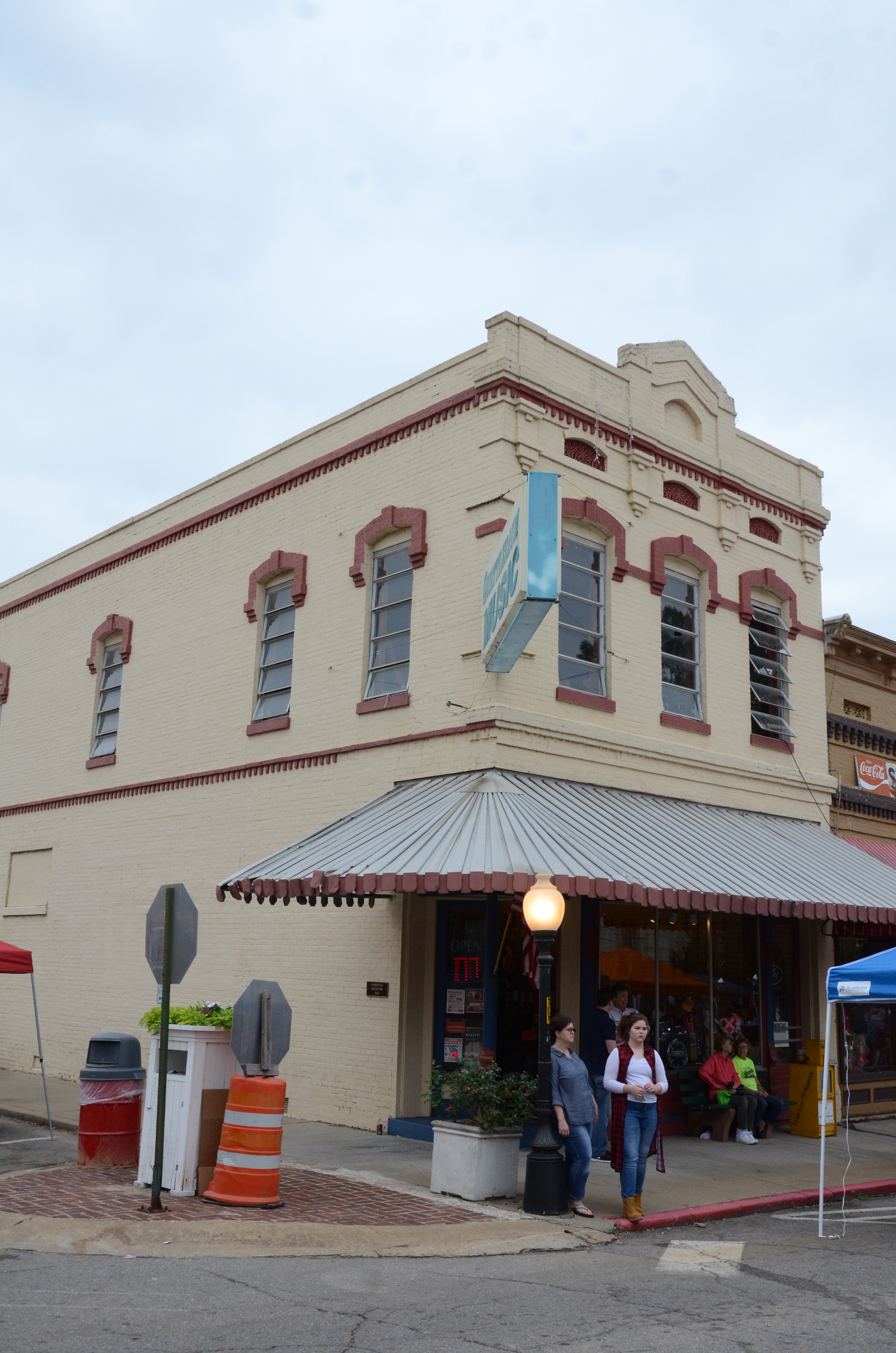

- Location within Arkansas Location within the United States
- Location: Jct. of Spring and Arch Sts., Searcy, Arkansas
- Coordinates: 35°15′0″N 91°44′16″W
- Area: less than one acre
- Built: 1860
- Architect: Stephen Brundidge Sr.
- Architectural style: Vernacular commercial
- MPS: White County MPS
- NRHP reference No.: 91001245
- Added to NRHP: September 13, 1991

The Robertson Drugstore is a historic commercial building at Spring Street and Arch Avenue in central Searcy, Arkansas. It is a two-story brick structure with basically vernacular style. It was built about 1860, and is the city's only commercial building to survive from the pre-Civil War period. It was the home to the city's first drugstore, and is the oldest commercial building in White County.

The building was listed on the National Register of Historic Places in 1991.

== See also ==
- National Register of Historic Places listings in White County, Arkansas
