= Bank of Searcy =

- U.S. National Register of Historic Places
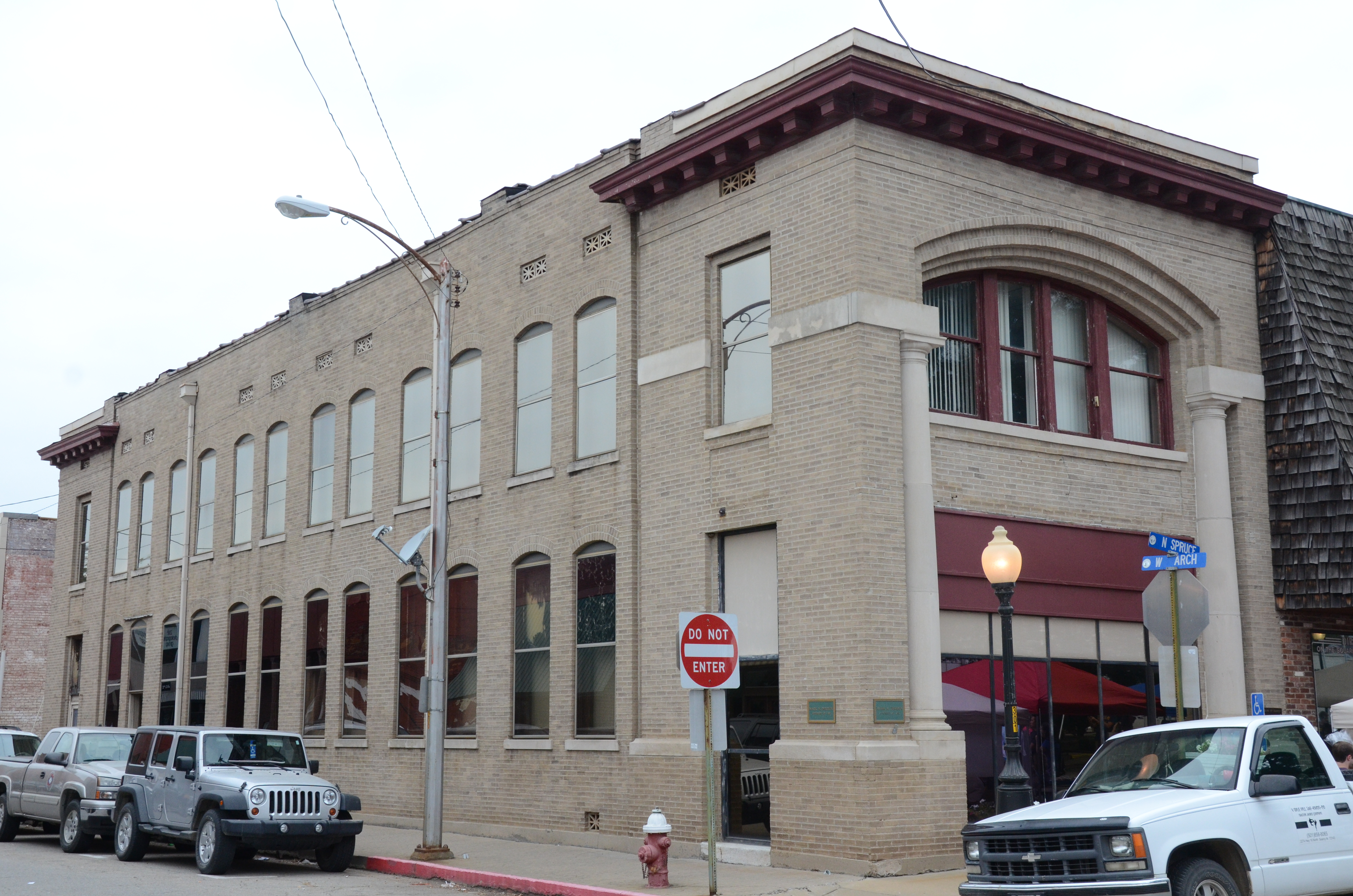

- Location within Arkansas Location within the United States
- Location: 301 N. Spruce St., Searcy, Arkansas
- Coordinates: 35°15′1″N 91°44′19″W
- Area: less than one acre
- Built: 1905
- Architectural style: Vernacular commercial
- MPS: White County MPS
- NRHP reference No.: 91001228
- Added to NRHP: September 5, 1991

The Bank of Searcy is a historic bank building at 301 North Spruce Street in downtown Searcy, Arkansas. It is a two-story buff brick structure, whose main entrance is flanked by Doric columns supporting a segmented arch. The building has other vernacular elements of the Classical Revival, including segmented-arch window bays on the facade facing Arch Avenue. It was built in 1906, following a fire that destroyed many of the commercial buildings on the west side of the courthouse, which stands across North Spruce Street.

The building was listed on the National Register of Historic Places in 1991.

== See also ==
- National Register of Historic Places listings in White County, Arkansas
