= Hoofman Farmstead Barn =

- U.S. National Register of Historic Places
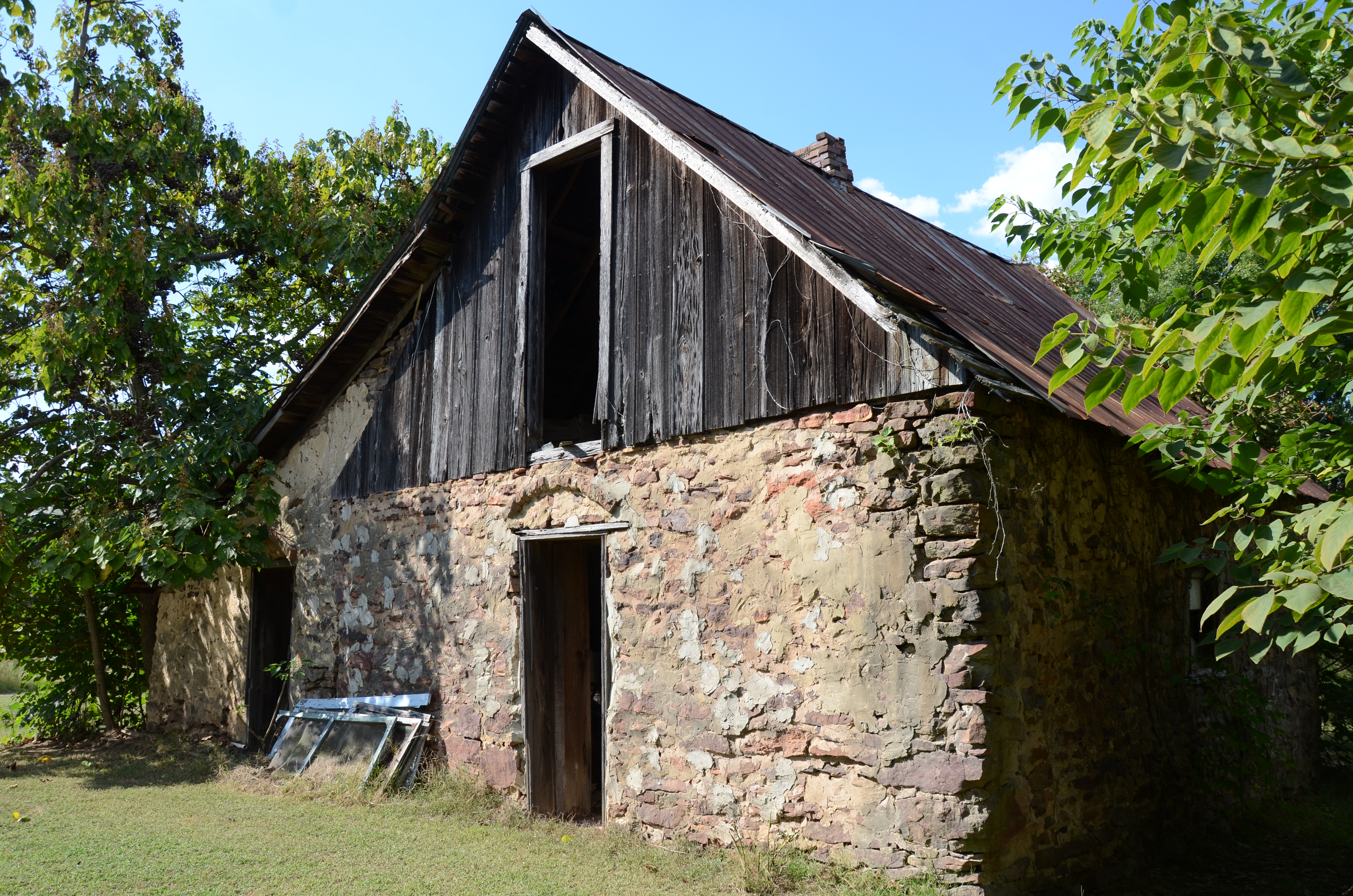

- Location within Arkansas Location within the United States
- Nearest city: Searcy, Arkansas
- Coordinates: 35°18′30″N 91°41′52″W
- Area: less than one acre
- Built: 1920
- Architectural style: Vernacular saltbox-plan barn
- MPS: White County MPS
- NRHP reference No.: 91001188
- Added to NRHP: July 22, 1992

The Hoofman Farmstead Barn is a historic barn in rural White County, Arkansas. It is located north of Searcy, on the west side of Salem Church Road. It is a stone structure, 1 1/2 stories in height, with a wood-frame gabled roof. It is basically rectangular, with a stone shed-roof extension on one side, giving it a saltbox profile. Built about 1920, it is the largest and possibly oldest historic stone structure in the county. It was built to serve as a large root cellar.

The barn was listed on the National Register of Historic Places in 1992.

== See also ==
- National Register of Historic Places listings in White County, Arkansas
