= National Register of Historic Places listings in White County, Arkansas =

Location of White County in Arkansas

White County, Arkansas, United States, has 187 properties and districts listed on the National Register of Historic Places. Another 26 properties in the county were once listed but have been removed. The locations of National Register properties and districts for which the latitude and longitude coordinates are included below, may be seen in a map.

Contents: Counties in Arkansas
- Arkansas
- Ashley
- Baxter
- Benton
- Boone
- Bradley
- Calhoun
- Carroll
- Chicot
- Clark
- Clay
- Cleburne
- Cleveland
- Columbia
- Conway
- Craighead
- Crawford
- Crittenden
- Cross
- Dallas
- Desha
- Drew
- Faulkner
- Franklin
- Fulton
- Garland
- Grant
- Greene
- Hempstead
- Hot Spring
- Howard
- Independence
- Izard
- Jackson
- Jefferson
- Johnson
- Lafayette
- Lawrence
- Lee
- Lincoln
- Little River
- Logan
- Lonoke
- Madison
- Marion
- Miller
- Mississippi
- Monroe
- Montgomery
- Nevada
- Newton
- Ouachita
- Perry
- Phillips
- Pike
- Poinsett
- Polk
- Pope
- Prairie
- Pulaski (Little Rock)
- Randolph
- St. Francis
- Saline
- Scott
- Searcy
- Sebastian
- Sevier
- Sharp
- Stone
- Union
- Van Buren
- Washington
- White
- Woodruff
- Yell

This National Park Service list is complete through NPS recent listings posted August 7, 2026.

== Current listings ==
	Name on the Register	Image	Date listed	Location	City or town	Description
1	William Thomas Abington House	William Thomas Abington House	July 11, 1992 (#91001350)	Center St., southwest of its junction with Highway 367; 35°04′28″N 91°52′30″W	Beebe	
2	Ackins House		July 11, 1992 (#91001322)	Junction of Highways 31 and 305; 35°11′31″N 91°58′01″W	Floyd	No longer standing.
3	American Legion Hall	American Legion Hall	September 13, 1991 (#91001186)	Junction of Race and Spruce Sts. 35°15′04″N 91°44′17″W	Searcy	
4	Col. Ralph Andrews House	Col. Ralph Andrews House	September 5, 1991 (#91001253)	517 W. Center St. 35°04′05″N 91°53′09″W	Beebe	
5	Baldock House	Baldock House	September 5, 1991 (#91001239)	Junction of S. Elm St. and W. Woodruff Ave. 35°14′45″N 91°44′25″W	Searcy	
6	Bank of Searcy	Bank of Searcy	September 5, 1991 (#91001228)	301 N. Spruce St. 35°15′01″N 91°44′19″W	Searcy	
7	Beebe Jail	Beebe Jail	September 13, 1991 (#91001251)	East of the junction of N. Main and Illinois Sts. 35°04′17″N 91°52′48″W	Beebe	
8	Beebe Railroad Station	Beebe Railroad Station	December 11, 1979 (#79000465)	Center St. 35°04′11″N 91°52′49″W	Beebe	
9	Beebe Theater		September 5, 1991 (#91001265)	Center St. 35°04′15″N 91°52′46″W	Beebe	Demolished.
10	Bell House	Bell House	September 5, 1991 (#91001201)	302 W. Woodruff Ave. 35°14′47″N 91°44′24″W	Searcy	
11	Berry House	Berry House	September 5, 1991 (#91001262)	208 Hickory; 35°04′22″N 91°53′14″W	Beebe	
12	Big Four School	Big Four School	July 10, 1992 (#91001192)	County Road 383 south of its junction with Highway 258; 35°20′44″N 91°38′34″W	Providence	Demolished.
13	Benjamin Clayton Black House	Benjamin Clayton Black House	November 20, 1974 (#74000505)	300 E. Race St. 35°15′36″N 91°44′01″W	Searcy	
14	Bloom House	Bloom House	September 5, 1991 (#91001176)	Junction of N. Maple and Academy Sts. 35°15′10″N 91°44′41″W	Searcy	
15	Blunt House Livestock Barn		July 10, 1992 (#91001363)	County Road 357, east of its junction with Highway 157; 35°31′00″N 91°38′13″W	Midway	
16	James William Boggs House	James William Boggs House	September 5, 1991 (#91001298)	Austin St. between South and Torrence Sts. 35°25′29″N 91°50′11″W	Pangburn	
17	Luke Bone Grocery-Boarding House	Luke Bone Grocery-Boarding House	September 13, 1991 (#91001275)	Junction of Main and Market Sts. 35°18′35″N 91°34′00″W	Bald Knob	
18	Green Booth House	Green Booth House	September 5, 1991 (#91001202)	Junction of S. Pecan St. and W. Center Ave. 35°14′56″N 91°44′39″W	Searcy	Demolished 2024.
19	Booth-Weir House	Booth-Weir House	September 5, 1991 (#91001345)	W. 1st St. 35°07′11″N 91°48′54″W	McRae	
20	Bradford City Hall-Byers Masonic Lodge	Bradford City Hall-Byers Masonic Lodge	October 21, 1999 (#99001260)	302 W. Walnut St. 35°25′27″N 91°27′19″W	Bradford	
21	Brooks House	Brooks House	July 10, 1992 (#91001217)	704 E. Market St. 35°14′59″N 91°43′48″W	Searcy	
22	Brown House	Brown House	September 13, 1991 (#91001268)	Elm St. 35°18′39″N 91°34′07″W	Bald Knob	
23	Joe Brown House and Farmstead		September 13, 1991 (#91001338)	County Road 529 northwest of Little Red; 35°28′34″N 91°43′20″W	Little Red	
24	Burnett House		July 11, 1992 (#91001337)	County Road 766 northwest of Searcy; 35°15′55″N 91°47′04″W	Searcy	Demolished.
25	Caldwell House	Caldwell House	September 5, 1991 (#91001347)	Junction of E. 2nd and Smith Sts. 35°06′43″N 91°49′19″W	McRae	
26	Campbell-Chrisp House	Campbell-Chrisp House	September 5, 1991 (#91001280)	102 Elm St. 35°18′38″N 91°34′09″W	Bald Knob	
27	Leslie and Anamiece Carmichael House		September 14, 2022 (#100008145)	712 Randall Dr. 35°15′15″N 91°43′30″W	Searcy	
28	Cary House	Cary House	July 10, 1992 (#91001293)	Junction of Searcy and Short Sts. 35°25′41″N 91°50′14″W	Pangburn	
29	Chandler House		July 10, 1992 (#91001310)	Junction of County Roads 327 and 379; 35°22′41″N 91°37′19″W	Stevens Creek	
30	Childers Farmstead	Childers Farmstead	July 11, 1992 (#91001349)	East of Highway 367 and south of McRae; 35°05′38″N 91°49′39″W	McRae	
31	Churchill-Hilger House	Churchill-Hilger House	September 5, 1991 (#91001301)	Junction of Main and Searcy Sts. 35°25′35″N 91°50′10″W	Pangburn	
32	Pattie Cobb Hall	Pattie Cobb Hall	September 5, 1991 (#91001209)	900 E. Center at Harding University; 35°14′50″N 91°43′40″W	Searcy	
33	Collison House	Collison House	May 29, 2008 (#08000489)	206 N. Main St. 35°18′43″N 91°34′03″W	Bald Knob	
34	Sam Cooley Barn		July 11, 1992 (#91001282)	County Road 96 southeast of Bald Knob; 35°17′41″N 91°32′53″W	Bald Knob	
35	Col. John Critz Farm, Springhouse		July 10, 1992 (#91001333)	County Road 818 west of its junction with County Road 41; 35°17′14″N 91°52′10″W	Center Hill	Demolished.
36	Cumberland Presbyterian Church	Cumberland Presbyterian Church	July 10, 1992 (#91001225)	Junction of Race and Spring Sts. 35°15′03″N 91°44′14″W	Searcy	
37	Jesse N. Cypert Law Office	Jesse N. Cypert Law Office	July 12, 1992 (#91001179)	104 E. Race St. 35°15′04″N 91°44′13″W	Searcy	
38	Darden-Gifford House	Darden-Gifford House	January 1, 1976 (#76000474)	North of Rose Bud off Highway 5; 35°20′15″N 92°04′44″W	Rose Bud	
39	Deener House	Deener House	December 22, 1982 (#82000957)	310 E. Center Ave. 35°14′54″N 91°43′57″W	Searcy	
40	Department of Labor Employment Security Division Office	Department of Labor Employment Security Division Office	September 13, 1991 (#100008146)	501 West Arch Ave. 35°15′00″N 91°44′32″W	Searcy	
41	Doniphan Lumber Mill Historic District		September 13, 1991 (#91001196)	Around Doniphan Lake off Highway 367; 35°15′02″N 91°40′31″W	Doniphan	
42	David Doyle House No. 2		September 5, 1991 (#91001302)	Junction of Highway 5 and County Road 953; 35°07′27″N 92°05′40″W	El Paso	Demolished 11/2003.
43	James W. Edie House	James W. Edie House	September 5, 1991 (#91001189)	Junction of Jackson and Washington Sts. 35°16′07″N 91°38′18″W	Judsonia	
44	El Paso Bank	El Paso Bank	September 5, 1991 (#91001303)	County Road 3 east of its junction with Highway 5; 35°07′34″N 92°05′45″W	El Paso	
45	Elm Street House	Elm Street House	September 13, 1991 (#91001269)	Elm St. 35°18′37″N 91°34′07″W	Bald Knob	
46	Joe Emmer House		July 12, 1992 (#91001327)	County Road 47; 35°21′36″N 91°45′29″W	Holly Springs	Demolished.
47	First United Methodist Church	First United Methodist Church	July 12, 1992 (#91001206)	Junction of Main and Market Sts. 35°15′00″N 91°44′09″W	Searcy	
48	Floyd Cotton Gin	Floyd Cotton Gin	July 12, 1992 (#91001324)	Junction of Highways 31 and 305; 35°11′29″N 91°58′04″W	Floyd	
49	Fox Motel House		July 12, 1992 (#91001267)	Highway 367; 35°18′51″N 91°33′55″W	Bald Knob	No longer standing.
50	Fredonia Cemetery Historic Section	Fredonia Cemetery Historic Section	January 29, 2007 (#06001312)	Roughly 0.5 miles (0.80 km) down Fredonia Rd., past its junction with Honeysuckle Rd. 35°23′12″N 91°37′34″W	Stevens Creek	
51	Wood Freeman House No. 1	Wood Freeman House No. 1	September 5, 1991 (#91001185)	702 Arch St. 35°15′01″N 91°44′40″W	Searcy	
52	Wood Freeman House No. 2		September 5, 1991 (#91001181)	703 W. Race St. 35°15′02″N 91°44′40″W	Searcy	No longer standing.
53	Dr. Frizell House	Dr. Frizell House	July 12, 1992 (#91001318)	Junction of U.S. Highway 67 and Elm St. 35°25′20″N 91°27′23″W	Bradford	
54	Lizzie Garrard House	Lizzie Garrard House	September 5, 1991 (#91001263)	N. Cypress St. 35°04′17″N 91°52′59″W	Beebe	
55	Milt Gooden House		July 13, 1992 (#91001281)	County Road 83 southeast of Bald Knob; 35°15′15″N 91°32′10″W	Bald Knob	No longer standing.
56	Grand Army of the Republic Memorial	Grand Army of the Republic Memorial	May 3, 1996 (#96000502)	Evergreen Cemetery, approximately 0.25 miles (0.40 km) south of the junction of Highways 367 and 13; 35°16′41″N 91°38′25″W	Judsonia	
57	Gravel Hill Baptist Church	Gravel Hill Baptist Church	July 21, 1992 (#91001323)	Gravel Hill Rd. 35°14′56″N 91°58′40″W	Gravel Hill	Demolished.
58	Gray House	Gray House	July 21, 1992 (#91001334)	Junction of County Roads 46 and 758; 35°18′27″N 91°48′48″W	Crosby	Demolished.
59	Louis Gray Homestead, Barn	Louis Gray Homestead, Barn	July 21, 1992 (#91001194)	Highway 157 east of Plainview; 35°18′48″N 91°39′18″W	Plainview	Demolished.
60	Rufus Gray House	Rufus Gray House	September 5, 1991 (#91001294)	Junction of Austin and South Sts. 35°25′27″N 91°50′10″W	Pangburn	
61	Gray-Kincaid House	Gray-Kincaid House	July 21, 1992 (#91001335)	Junction of County Roads 46 and 759; 35°19′01″N 91°49′17″W	Crosby	
62	Griffithville School		July 13, 1992 (#91001357)	Highway 11 west of its junction with Highway 385; 35°07′14″N 91°38′54″W	Griffithville	Building listed on the NRHP has been demolished, but the gym and another building dating to the same period still stand.
63	Thomas Jefferson Hale General Merchandise Store	Thomas Jefferson Hale General Merchandise Store	July 21, 1992 (#91001358)	Junction of County Roads 62 and 433; 35°04′46″N 91°44′37″W	Vinity Corner	
64	Fred Hall House	Fred Hall House	September 5, 1991 (#91001222)	Junction of 2nd and W. Searcy Sts. 35°13′58″N 91°40′07″W	Kensett	
65	Mary Alice Hammond House	Mary Alice Hammond House	July 21, 1992 (#91001204)	County Road 839 west of its junction with Highway 367; 35°11′41″N 91°44′04″W	Searcy	Demolished.
66	Roy Harper House		July 21, 1992 (#91001304)	County Road 16 east of its junction with Highway 5; 35°11′26″N 92°02′53″W	Romance	
67	Morris Hartsell Farmstead		September 13, 1991 (#91001340)	Highway 157; 35°25′48″N 91°41′09″W	Steprock	
68	Hassell House	Hassell House	September 5, 1991 (#91001205)	Junction of S. Elm St. and W. Woodruff Ave. 35°14′45″N 91°44′27″W	Searcy	
69	Brady Hays Homestead		September 13, 1991 (#91001312)	U.S. Highway 167 south of Denmark; 35°28′12″N 91°35′17″W	Denmark	Burned 7/15/2007.
70	Alfred W. Henson House	Alfred W. Henson House	October 23, 1986 (#86002938)	111 Main St. 35°16′14″N 91°38′27″W	Judsonia	Burned and demolished.
71	Marshall Hickmon Homestead	Marshall Hickmon Homestead	July 21, 1992 (#91001317)	Highway 87; 35°25′28″N 91°27′55″W	Bradford	
72	U.L. Hickmon Hardware Store	U.L. Hickmon Hardware Store	September 5, 1991 (#91001316)	Junction of Main and 2nd Sts. 35°25′25″N 91°27′20″W	Bradford	
73	Hicks-Dugan-Deener House	Hicks-Dugan-Deener House	April 18, 1985 (#85000835)	306 E. Center St. 35°14′54″N 91°43′51″W	Searcy	
74	Louis N. Hilger Homestead, Livestock Barn	Louis N. Hilger Homestead, Livestock Barn	July 21, 1992 (#91001191)	County Road 374 west of its junction with Highway 157; 35°22′10″N 91°41′31″W	Providence	
75	Hill Farm	Hill Farm	July 21, 1992 (#91001258)	North of U.S. Highway 67 southwest of Beebe; 35°03′37″N 91°56′42″W	Beebe	
76	Hoag House		July 21, 1992 (#91001236)	Junction of Highways 157 and 367; 35°17′07″N 91°37′49″W	Judsonia	Demolished.
77	Holly Grove School		July 13, 1992 (#91001309)	County Road 379 north of its junction with County Road 327; 35°22′41″N 91°37′20″W	Stevens Creek	Burned in early 2014.
78	Hoofman Farmstead Barn	Hoofman Farmstead Barn	July 22, 1992 (#91001188)	Between Plainview and the Little Red River; 35°18′30″N 91°41′52″W	Searcy	
79	Arthur W. Hoofman House	Arthur W. Hoofman House	July 22, 1992 (#91001184)	Junction of E. Race and N. Cross Sts. 35°15′01″N 91°43′24″W	Searcy	
80	Tobe Hoofman Farmstead	Tobe Hoofman Farmstead	July 22, 1992 (#91001238)	Highway 13 north of its junction with Highway 157; 35°19′18″N 91°39′43″W	Providence	
81	Hopewell District No. 45 School		July 13, 1992 (#91001283)	Highway 258 west of Lake Bald Knob; 35°20′12″N 91°36′05″W	Hopewell	Demolished.
82	Hunt House	Hunt House	September 13, 1991 (#91001207)	707 W. Center St. 35°14′54″N 91°44′41″W	Searcy	
83	Thomas Hunt House		July 22, 1992 (#91001193)	Highway 157 north of Plainview; 35°20′01″N 91°40′35″W	Plainview	Burned to the ground 9-24-2015.
84	L.D. Hutchinson House	L.D. Hutchinson House	July 22, 1992 (#91001325)	Highway 31 north of its junction with Highway 305; 35°11′47″N 91°58′02″W	Floyd	
85	Dr. James House		September 13, 1991 (#91001241)	Junction of W. Center and S. Gum Sts. 35°14′55″N 91°44′22″W	Searcy	; probably demolished
86	Jameson-Richards Cafe	Jameson-Richards Cafe	September 5, 1991 (#91001266)	Highway 367 east of its junction with Vine St. 35°18′35″N 91°34′07″W	Bald Knob	
87	Jameson-Richards Gas Station	Jameson-Richards Gas Station	September 5, 1991 (#91001279)	Junction of Highway 367 and Vine St. 35°18′34″N 91°34′08″W	Bald Knob	
88	Joiner House	Joiner House	July 22, 1992 (#91001214)	708 Market St. 35°14′59″N 91°43′45″W	Searcy	
89	Mark P. Jones House	Mark P. Jones House	September 5, 1991 (#91001197)	Junction of Center and Fir Sts. 35°14′55″N 91°44′33″W	Searcy	
90	Judsonia Bridge	Judsonia Bridge	April 9, 1990 (#90000535)	County Road 66 over the Little Red River; 35°16′03″N 91°38′23″W	Judsonia	
91	Judsonia Community Building Historic District	Judsonia Community Building Historic District	September 5, 1991 (#91001234)	Junction of Judson Ave. and 6th St. 35°16′22″N 91°38′20″W	Judsonia	
92	C.D. Kelly House	C.D. Kelly House	September 5, 1991 (#91001190)	Junction of Main and Adams Sts. 35°16′12″N 91°38′27″W	Judsonia	
93	Kerr-Booth House	Kerr-Booth House	March 2, 2006 (#06000076)	611 W. Center Ave. 35°15′01″N 91°44′34″W	Searcy	
94	S.A. Kimbrough House	S.A. Kimbrough House	September 5, 1991 (#91001252)	302 E. Illinois St. 35°04′21″N 91°52′43″W	Beebe	
95	Henry W. Klotz Sr. Service Station	Henry W. Klotz Sr. Service Station	September 13, 1991 (#91001273)	W. 1st St. 35°21′51″N 91°30′27″W	Russell	
96	Henry Klotz Sr. House	Henry Klotz Sr. House	July 22, 1992 (#91001285)	1st St. 35°21′52″N 91°30′26″W	Russell	
97	Capt. Larned House	Capt. Larned House	July 22, 1992 (#91001235)	Highway 157 north of U.S. Highway 64; 35°18′14″N 91°38′37″W	Judsonia	
98	Lattimer House	Lattimer House	September 5, 1991 (#91001215)	Junction of Oak and Market Sts. 35°14′59″N 91°44′03″W	Searcy	
99	Laws-Jarvis House	Laws-Jarvis House	July 22, 1992 (#91001256)	409 N. Main St. 35°04′22″N 91°52′55″W	Beebe	
100	Harvey Lea House		July 13, 1992 (#91001270)	County Road 70; 35°21′53″N 91°30′40″W	Russell	Burned down.
101	Leggett House		July 13, 1992 (#91001339)	Highway 124 east of Little Red; 35°26′56″N 91°43′50″W	Little Red	
102	Letona Hotel	Letona Hotel	September 13, 1991 (#91001329)	Off Highway 310; 35°21′44″N 91°49′45″W	Letona	
103	Lightle House	Lightle House	December 22, 1982 (#82000958)	605 Race Ave. 35°15′01″N 91°43′50″W	Searcy	
104	Lightle House		July 20, 1992 (#91001224)	County Road 76; 35°15′20″N 91°42′40″W	Searcy	
105	Ben Lightle House	Ben Lightle House	September 5, 1991 (#91001216)	Junction of N. Locust and E. Market Sts. 35°14′58″N 91°44′06″W	Searcy	Demolished.
106	William H. Lightle House	William H. Lightle House	September 5, 1991 (#91001226)	601 E. Race St. 35°15′02″N 91°43′55″W	Searcy	
107	Jim Little House		September 5, 1991 (#91001315)	Walnut St. east of its junction with Front St. 35°25′24″N 91°27′11″W	Bradford	No longer standing.
108	Livestock and Equipment Barn, Glenn Homestead	Livestock and Equipment Barn, Glenn Homestead	July 20, 1992 (#91001287)	Highway 124 northeast of Pangburn; 35°25′51″N 91°48′00″W	Pangburn	
109	Lone Star School		July 20, 1992 (#91001355)	East of Big Mingo Creek; 35°13′20″N 91°30′05″W	Lone Star	Demolished.
110	Dr. Lovell House	Dr. Lovell House	July 20, 1992 (#91001314)	Walnut St. east of its junction with Main St. 35°25′28″N 91°27′25″W	Bradford	
111	E.D. Maddox Farm Chicken House		July 20, 1992 (#91001359)	County Road 36 east of its junction with Highway 5; 35°19′57″N 92°04′25″W	Rose Bud	; possibly moved or demolished.
112	Walter Marsh House	Walter Marsh House	September 5, 1991 (#91001288)	Junction of Maple and Torrence Sts. 35°25′24″N 91°50′30″W	Pangburn	
113	Wesley Marsh House	Wesley Marsh House	July 20, 1992 (#91001328)	Junction of Highways 16 and 305; 35°22′19″N 91°48′33″W	Letona	
114	Martindale Corn Crib	Martindale Corn Crib	July 20, 1992 (#91001330)	Highway 310; 35°21′43″N 91°50′28″W	Letona	
115	Mason House		July 20, 1992 (#91001319)	W. Main St. west of its junction with Walnut St. 35°25′30″N 91°27′37″W	Bradford	No longer standing.
116	Mayfair Hotel	Mayfair Hotel	September 5, 1991 (#91001242)	Junction of Spring and Center Sts. 35°14′56″N 91°44′16″W	Searcy	
117	McAdams House	McAdams House	September 5, 1991 (#91001289)	Junction of Maple and South Sts. 35°25′21″N 91°50′25″W	Pangburn	
118	Dr. McAdams House		September 13, 1991 (#91001300)	Junction of Maple and Searcy Sts. 35°25′29″N 91°50′08″W	Pangburn	Demolished prior to 2010.
119	Emmett McDonald House	Emmett McDonald House	July 20, 1992 (#91001368)	County Road 443 southeast of McRae; 35°05′40″N 91°48′27″W	McRae	Demolished.
120	McRae Jail	McRae Jail	July 20, 1992 (#91001344)	E. 1st St. 35°06′48″N 91°49′16″W	McRae	
121	Methodist Episcopal Church, South	Methodist Episcopal Church, South	July 20, 1992 (#91001278)	Junction of Main and Center Sts. 35°18′40″N 91°34′04″W	Bald Knob	
122	Emmett Miller House		July 20, 1992 (#91001237)	Highway 13 east of Plainview; 35°18′38″N 91°39′38″W	Plainview	Demolished.
123	Mills House	Mills House	September 5, 1991 (#91001220)	200 W. Searcy St. 35°13′59″N 91°40′09″W	Kensett	
124	Missouri Pacific Depot	Missouri Pacific Depot	July 20, 1992 (#91001276)	Junction of Market and Ramey Sts. 35°18′28″N 91°34′09″W	Bald Knob	
125	Missouri Pacific Railway Caboose No. 928	Missouri Pacific Railway Caboose No. 928	May 16, 2011 (#11000303)	Next to UPRR on Market St., southwest of Vine St. 35°18′28″N 91°34′09″W	Bald Knob	
126	Moody House	Moody House	July 20, 1992 (#91001277)	104 Market St. 35°18′24″N 91°34′16″W	Bald Knob	
127	Morris House	Morris House	December 4, 1978 (#78000641)	Route 1; 35°29′03″N 91°37′31″W	Bradford	
128	Morris Institute Dairy Barn		July 20, 1992 (#91001332)	County Road 41 south of its junction with County Road 818; 35°16′31″N 91°52′01″W	Crosby	Demolished.
129	Mount Olive-Bedford Chapel Cemetery	Mount Olive-Bedford Chapel Cemetery	May 30, 2019 (#100003997)	SW of the intersection of Nix & Manning Rds. 35°15′07″N 92°06′03″W	Mount Vernon vicinity	
130	J.A. Neaville House	J.A. Neaville House	July 22, 1992 (#91001356)	Highway 385 north of its junction with Highway 11; 35°07′26″N 91°38′40″W	Griffithville	
131	New Mt. Pisgah School	New Mt. Pisgah School	July 20, 1992 (#91001331)	Between Mt. Pisgah and Little Creek; 35°19′45″N 91°49′48″W	New Mt. Pisgah	
132	Nimmo Clubhouse	Nimmo Clubhouse	July 22, 1992 (#91001360)	County Road 65 at the Little Red River; 35°11′03″N 91°28′34″W	Nimmo	
133	Howard O'Neal Barn		July 20, 1992 (#91001286)	County Road 73 south of Russell; 35°21′19″N 91°30′21″W	Russell	Demolished.
134	Austin Pangburn House	Austin Pangburn House	September 5, 1991 (#91001290)	Junction of Main and Austin Sts. 35°25′34″N 91°50′16″W	Pangburn	
135	Paschall House	Paschall House	September 5, 1991 (#91001203)	Junction of N. Oak and E. Center Sts. 35°14′56″N 91°44′02″W	Searcy	
136	Patman House		September 5, 1991 (#91001292)	Junction of Mountain and Jackson Sts. 35°25′17″N 91°50′30″W	Pangburn	Demolished prior to 2010.
137	Pence-Carmichael Farm, Barn and Root Cellar	Pence-Carmichael Farm, Barn and Root Cellar	July 20, 1992 (#91001305)	Off Highway 31 east of Romance; 35°14′29″N 92°02′25″W	Romance	
138	Plummer House	Plummer House	July 22, 1992 (#91001247)	314 Alabama St. 35°03′39″N 91°52′37″W	Beebe	
139	Powell Clothing Store	Powell Clothing Store	September 5, 1991 (#91001249)	201 N. Main St. 35°04′16″N 91°52′51″W	Beebe	
140	Prince House		July 22, 1992 (#91001307)	County Road 68 northwest of Velvet Ridge; 35°26′19″N 91°35′50″W	Velvet Ridge	
141	Edward Ransom Farmstead, Livestock and Equipment Barn		July 22, 1992 (#91001361)	County Road 359 west of its junction with U.S. Highway 167; 35°30′11″N 91°36′46″W	Midway	Demolished.
142	Sam Ray House	Sam Ray House	July 23, 1992 (#91001296)	Highway 305 northeast of its junction with County Road 47; 35°24′02″N 91°46′58″W	Clay	
143	J.C. Rhew Co. Packing Shed		July 23, 1992 (#91001343)	County Road 376 northeast of Providence; 35°23′57″N 91°38′53″W	Providence	No longer standing.
144	Rialto Theater	Rialto Theater	September 13, 1991 (#91001231)	Junction of Race and Spring Sts. 35°15′03″N 91°44′16″W	Searcy	
145	Robertson Drugstore	Robertson Drugstore	September 13, 1991 (#91001245)	Junction of Spring and Arch Sts. 35°15′00″N 91°44′16″W	Searcy	
146	Robertson House	Robertson House	September 5, 1991 (#91001221)	Junction of 2nd and Dandridge Sts. 35°13′55″N 91°40′13″W	Kensett	
147	Rock Building	Rock Building	July 23, 1992 (#91001195)	County Road 370 south of its junction with Highway 157; 35°18′00″N 91°40′09″W	Plainview	
148	Russell Jail	Russell Jail	July 23, 1992 (#91001271)	Off Elm St. 35°21′46″N 91°30′33″W	Russell	
149	St. Richard's Catholic Church	St. Richard's Catholic Church	July 20, 1992 (#91001274)	Junction of Hickory and Cleveland Sts. 35°18′42″N 91°34′14″W	Bald Knob	
150	Scott-Davis House		July 20, 1992 (#91001306)	County Road 15 southwest of Romance; 35°13′41″N 92°03′29″W	Romance	
151	Searcy Commercial Historic District	Searcy Commercial Historic District	November 28, 2024 (#100010831)	Courthouse Square (300 N. Spruce St.), 100 block of W. Arch Ave., 100 and 200 block of W. Market Ave. (south side only). 100 block of W Race Ave., 118-120 N. Spruce St., and 100 and 200 block of N. Spring St. 35°15′00″N 91°44′19″W	Searcy	
152	Searcy Confederate Monument	Searcy Confederate Monument	April 26, 1996 (#96000458)	Courthouse lawn near the junction of W. Arch Ave. and Spring St. 35°15′03″N 91°44′18″W	Searcy	
153	Searcy Post Office	Searcy Post Office	July 20, 1992 (#91001200)	Southwestern corner of the junction of Gum and Arch Sts. 35°14′59″N 91°44′24″W	Searcy	Now the municipal courthouse
154	Sellers House	Sellers House	September 5, 1991 (#91001261)	702 W. Center St. 35°04′06″N 91°53′16″W	Beebe	
155	Shue House	Shue House	September 5, 1991 (#91001257)	108 Holly St. 35°04′08″N 91°53′18″W	Beebe	
156	John Shutter House	John Shutter House	September 5, 1991 (#91001299)	Junction of Austin and Main Sts. 35°25′32″N 91°50′15″W	Pangburn	
157	Stanley Simpson Farmstead Picking Shed		September 13, 1991 (#91001342)	County Road 390 west of its junction with Highway 157; 35°22′44″N 91°41′25″W	Providence	
158	Smith House	Smith House	September 5, 1991 (#91001218)	607 W. Arch Ave. 35°15′00″N 91°44′36″W	Searcy	
159	A.J. Smith House		September 5, 1991 (#91001223)	Highway 385; 35°07′35″N 91°38′41″W	Griffithville	No longer standing.
160	Smyrna Methodist Church	Smyrna Methodist Church	July 20, 1992 (#91001336)	Highway 36 east of Center Hill; 35°15′08″N 91°51′11″W	Center Hill	
161	Dr. Emmett Snipes House		September 5, 1991 (#91001243)	Junction of E. Market and N. Locust Sts. 35°14′59″N 91°44′05″W	Searcy	No longer standing.
162	Staggs-Huffaker Building	Staggs-Huffaker Building	September 5, 1991 (#91001250)	Junction of N. Main and W. Illinois Sts. 35°04′15″N 91°52′50″W	Beebe	
163	Stipe Cotton Gin	Stipe Cotton Gin	July 20, 1992 (#91001248)	Junction of Florida and Cypress Sts. 35°04′04″N 91°52′42″W	Beebe	
164	William Howell House, Storm Cellar	William Howell House, Storm Cellar	July 20, 1992 (#91001295)	County Road 47 east of its junction with Highway 305; 35°23′47″N 91°47′06″W	Clay	
165	Thomas House		July 23, 1992 (#91001326)	County Road 751 northwest of Fourmile Hill; 35°18′23″N 91°47′17″W	Fourmile Hill	
166	Thompson House		July 23, 1992 (#91001341)	County Road 328 behind Holly Grove Cemetery; 35°23′08″N 91°37′52″W	Stevens Creek	
167	John Thrasher Homestead		July 23, 1992 (#91001362)	Off County Road 359 west of its junction with U.S. Highway 167; 35°30′05″N 91°36′50″W	Midway	Demolished.
168	Titan II ICBM Launch Complex 373-5 Site	Titan II ICBM Launch Complex 373-5 Site	March 6, 2000 (#00000100)	Approximately 0.5 miles (0.80 km) northeast of Highway 36; 35°15′34″N 91°51′26″W	Center Hill	
169	Titus House	Titus House	September 5, 1991 (#91001240)	406 E. Center St. 35°14′56″N 91°44′00″W	Searcy	
170	Trinity Episcopal Church	Trinity Episcopal Church	July 23, 1992 (#91001199)	Junction of N. Elm and Market Sts. 35°14′59″N 91°44′25″W	Searcy	
171	Walker Homestead Historic District	Walker Homestead Historic District	July 20, 1992 (#91001351)	County Road 56 east of its junction with Highway 267; 35°11′16″N 91°46′35″W	Garner	
172	Otha Walker Homestead	Otha Walker Homestead	July 23, 1992 (#91001354)	Highway 36; 35°12′12″N 91°36′27″W	West Point	
173	Ward-Stout House	Ward-Stout House	September 5, 1991 (#91001313)	Junction of Front and Walnut Sts. 35°25′23″N 91°27′15″W	Bradford	
174	Watkins House	Watkins House	September 5, 1991 (#91001182)	1208 E. Race St. 35°15′03″N 91°43′25″W	Searcy	
175	Tom Watkins House	Tom Watkins House	September 5, 1991 (#91001183)	Junction of Oak and Race Sts. 35°15′03″N 91°44′01″W	Searcy	
176	William Henry Watson Homestead	William Henry Watson Homestead	July 20, 1992 (#91001308)	County Road 68 south of Denmark; 35°26′32″N 91°35′23″W	Denmark	Demolished.
177	Weber House		September 5, 1991 (#91001272)	Elm St. 35°21′46″N 91°30′36″W	Russell	Burned down.
178	Albert Whisinant House		July 23, 1992 (#91001297)	Highway 16 north of Mountain Home; 35°24′02″N 91°49′08″W	Mountain Home	
179	White County Courthouse	White County Courthouse	August 3, 1977 (#77000279)	Court Sq. 35°15′17″N 91°44′16″W	Searcy	
180	Wilburn House	Wilburn House	September 5, 1991 (#91001177)	707 E. Race St. 35°15′02″N 91°43′48″W	Searcy	
181	Williams House		July 23, 1992 (#91001353)	Junction of Highway 267 and County Road 54; 35°13′44″N 91°45′00″W	Searcy	No longer standing.
182	Arthur Williams Homestead, Feed Storage Shed		July 23, 1992 (#91001321)	Falwell Rd. 35°25′15″N 91°27′50″W	Bradford	
183	Jack Wood House	Jack Wood House	November 2, 1989 (#89001939)	Judson Ave. 35°16′49″N 91°38′14″W	Judsonia	
184	Arthur W. Woodson House	Arthur W. Woodson House	September 5, 1991 (#91001211)	1005 W. Arch Ave. 35°15′00″N 91°44′51″W	Searcy	
185	Dalton Woodson House	Dalton Woodson House	September 5, 1991 (#91001212)	1007 W. Arch Ave. 35°15′00″N 91°44′54″W	Searcy	
186	Avanell Wright House	Avanell Wright House	September 5, 1991 (#91001291)	Junction of Main and Pine Sts. 35°25′38″N 91°50′07″W	Pangburn	
187	Jim Wright Farmstead Historic District	Jim Wright Farmstead Historic District	September 5, 1991 (#91001284)	Highway 258 east of its junction with Highway 323; 35°21′14″N 91°37′10″W	Bald Knob	

== Former listings ==
	Name on the Register	Image	Date listed	Date removed	Location	City or town	Description
1	Arnold Farmstead		September 13, 1991 (#91001187)	January 26, 2018	Off Maple St., south of Deener Creek; 35°15′20″N 91°44′32″W	Searcy	Demolished.
2	Coward House		July 10, 1992 (#91001229)	January 26, 2018	1105 N. Maple St. 35°15′34″N 91°44′42″W	Searcy	Demolished.
3	Cremane House	Cremane House	July 10, 1992 (#91001320)	May 5, 2025	County Road 95 west of Bradford Lake; 35°25′01″N 91°26′19″W	Bradford	
4	Cross House		July 10, 1992 (#91001259)	January 26, 2018	410 S. Main St. 35°03′58″N 91°52′31″W	Beebe	No longer standing.
5	Doss House		September 5, 1991 (#91001264)	October 18, 2002	408 N. Main Street	Beebe	Destroyed by an F3 tornado, January 21, 1999.
6	First Christian Church		September 5, 1991 (#91001198)	September 25, 2003	Junction of Race and N. Locust Sts.	Searcy	
7	Leonard Gordon Homestead, Hexagonal Grain Crib		July 21, 1992 (#91001311)	January 24, 2017	County Road 69; 35°22′34″N 91°36′01″W	Twentythree	
8	Herring Building		September 5, 1991 (#91001348)	March 31, 2000	Junction of E. First and Smith Streets	McRae	
9	Herring Building		September 28, 2005 (#05001083)	September 25, 2012	601-603 E. 1st. St.	McRae	
10	Ida Hicks House		September 5, 1991 (#91001180)	January 26, 2018	410 W. Arch St. 35°15′01″N 91°44′29″W	Searcy	Demolished prior to 2004.
11	Honey Hill Christian Union Church		September 5, 1991 (#91001352)	May 15, 2003	South of AR 36, southwest of Searcy	Searcy	
12	Judsonia High School Gymnasium		September 13, 1991 (#91001232)	September 29, 2015	Roadman Ave. 35°16′37″N 91°38′19″W	Judsonia	No longer standing.
13	Lemay House		July 20, 1992 (#91001254)	January 26, 2018	305 S. Cypress St. 35°03′39″N 91°52′37″W	Beebe	No longer standing.
14	Lightle House		September 5, 1991 (#91001244)	January 26, 2018	107 N. Elm St. 35°14′57″N 91°44′27″W	Searcy	Demolished.
15	Moore House	Moore House	September 13, 1991 (#91001210)	January 3, 2022	405 Center St. 35°14′54″N 91°44′27″W	Searcy	
16	National Guard Armory Building		September 13, 1991 (#91001178)	September 20, 2006	Junction of Race and N. Locust Sts.	Searcy	
17	Pemberton House		September 5, 1991 (#91001255)	March 31, 2000	601 N. Cypress Street	Beebe	Likely destroyed by an F3 tornado, January 21, 1999.
18	Rascoe House		July 23, 1992 (#91001213)	January 26, 2018	702 Main St. 35°14′33″N 91°44′10″W	Searcy	No longer standing.
19	Porter Rodgers Sr. House		September 5, 1991 (#91001230)	January 26, 2018	Junction of N. Oak and E. Race Sts. 35°14′54″N 91°44′41″W	Searcy	Demolished.
20	Bob Rogers House		September 13, 1991 (#91001219)	January 26, 2018	Junction of S. Spring St. and W. Woodruff Ave. 35°14′45″N 91°44′14″W	Searcy	Demolished.
21	Roper House		September 5, 1991 (#91001227)	January 14, 2002	Hill Street	McRae	
22	Searcy City Hall		September 5, 1991 (#91001227)	October 11, 2005	Junction of Wade and 14th Sts.	Searcy	Destroyed by fire, January 27, 2005.
23	Dean L.C. Sears House		July 20, 1992 (#91001208)	January 26, 2018	805 E. Center St. 35°14′54″N 91°43′41″W	Searcy	Demolished prior to 2004.
24	Smith-Moore House		July 20, 1992 (#91001246)	January 26, 2018	901 N. Main St. 35°04′41″N 91°52′55″W	Beebe	
25	R. L. Van Meter House		September 5, 1991 (#91001233)	October 4, 1999	Junction of Wade and 14th Sts.	Judsonia	
26	Lipsy Westbrooke House		September 5, 1991 (#91001260)	March 31, 2000	809 W. Center Street	Beebe	Likely destroyed by an F3 tornado, January 21, 1999.

== See also ==
- List of National Historic Landmarks in Arkansas
- National Register of Historic Places listings in Arkansas
