= Harvey Lea House =

Historic house in Arkansas, United States

- U.S. National Register of Historic Places
- Location within Arkansas Location within the United States
- Location: Co. Rd. 70, Russell, Arkansas
- Coordinates: 35°21′53″N 91°30′40″W
- Area: less than one acre
- Built: 1925
- Architectural style: Bungalow/craftsman
- MPS: White County MPS
- NRHP reference No.: 91001270
- Added to NRHP: July 13, 1992

The Harvey Lea House was a historic house on Russell Mountain Road (County Road 70), just north of Russell, Arkansas. It was a 1 1/2-story wood-frame structure, with a side-gable roof and weatherboard siding. The roof gables had exposed rafter ends and large brackets in the Craftsman style, and a recessed porch supported by square posts. A gabled dormer projected from the front roof face. The house, built about 1925, was one of Russell's finest examples of Craftsman architecture.

The house was listed on the National Register of Historic Places in 1992. It has been marked as destroyed in the Arkansas Historic Preservation Program database.

== See also ==
- National Register of Historic Places listings in White County, Arkansas
