= Brady Hays Homestead =

Historic house in Arkansas, United States

- U.S. National Register of Historic Places
- Nearest city: Denmark, Arkansas
- Area: 80 acres (32 ha)
- Built: 1885
- Built by: Brady Hays
- Architectural style: Vernacular ell-shaped
- MPS: White County MPS
- NRHP reference No.: 91001312
- Added to NRHP: September 13, 1991

The Brady Hays Homestead was a historic farmstead in rural northern White County, Arkansas. The property included a house and barn built about 1885 by Brady Hays. The house was a double pen frame house of vernacular style, and the barn was a notably large two story transverse crib design, incorporating an older barn into its structure.

The property was listed on the National Register of Historic Places in 1991. It was reported to be destroyed by fire in 2007, and it has been listed as destroyed in the Arkansas Historic Preservation Program database.

== See also ==
- National Register of Historic Places listings in White County, Arkansas
