= Paschall House =

Historic house in Arkansas, United States

- U.S. National Register of Historic Places
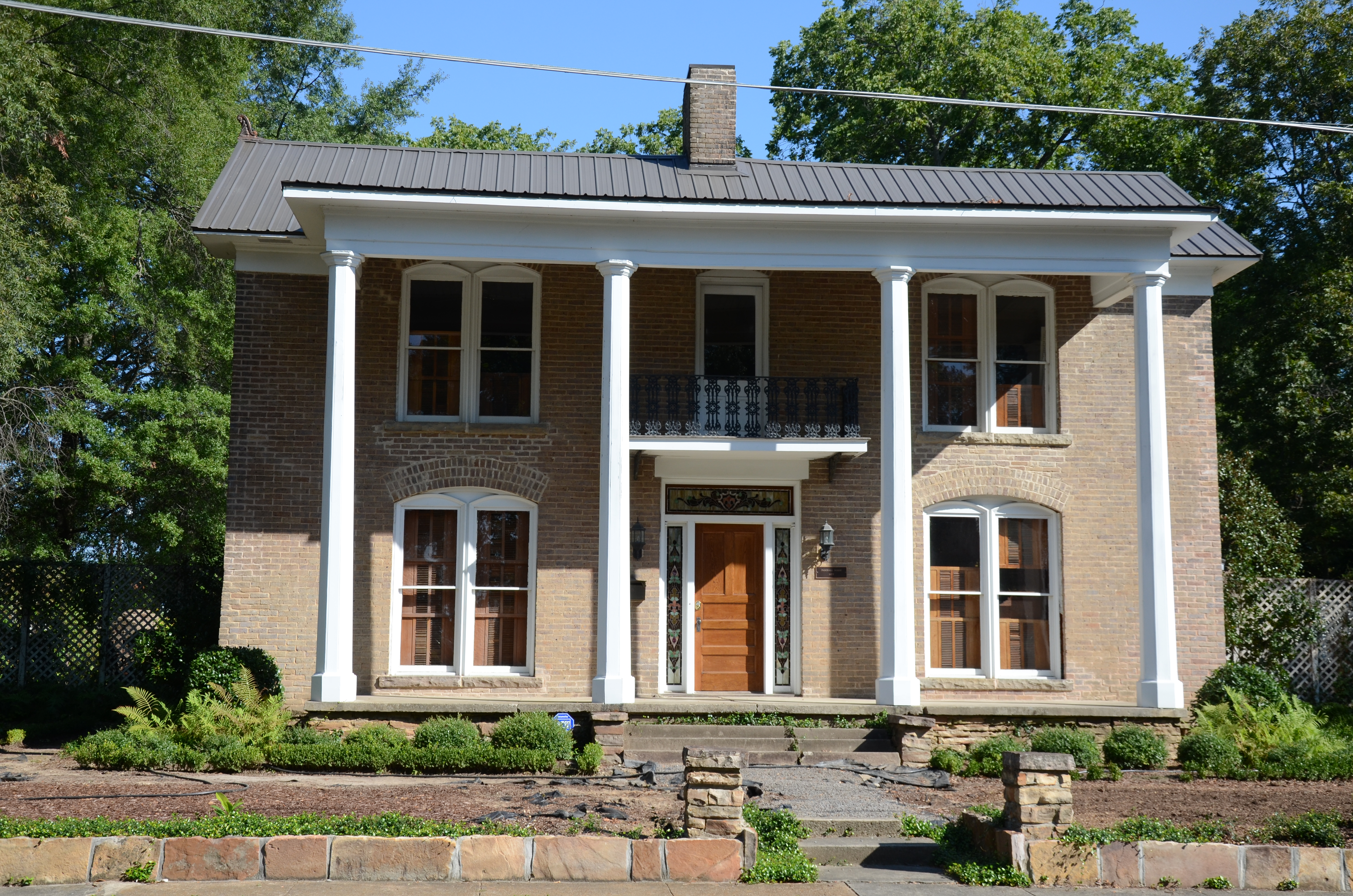

- Location within Arkansas Location within the United States
- Location: Jct. of N. Oak and E. Center Sts., Searcy, Arkansas
- Coordinates: 35°14′56″N 91°44′2″W
- Area: less than one acre
- Built: 1890
- Architectural style: Vernacular I-house
- MPS: White County MPS
- NRHP reference No.: 91001203
- Added to NRHP: September 5, 1991

The Paschall House is a historic house at North Oak and East Center Streets in Searcy, Arkansas. It is a two-story wood frame I-house, with an integral T ell to the rear, finished in brick veneer and capped by a gabled roof. A full-height porch extends across the front, its flat roof supported by round wooden columns. A wrought iron balcony projects over the center entrance beneath the porch. The house was built about 1890, and is a rare surviving example of the I-house form in White County from that period.

The house was listed on the National Register of Historic Places in 1991.

== See also ==
- National Register of Historic Places listings in White County, Arkansas
