= Prince House =

Historic house in Arkansas, United States

- U.S. National Register of Historic Places
- Location within Arkansas Location within the United States
- Nearest city: Velvet Ridge, Arkansas
- Coordinates: 35°26′19″N 91°35′50″W
- Area: less than one acre
- Built: 1920
- Architectural style: Vernacular double-pen
- MPS: White County MPS
- NRHP reference No.: 91001307
- Added to NRHP: July 22, 1992

The Prince House is a historic house in rural northern White County, Arkansas. It is located on the west side of County Road 68, about 0.25 miles (0.40 km) south of County Road 350, roughly 2 miles (3.2 km) north of Velvet Ridge. It is a single story wood-frame structure, with a double-pen plan topped by a gable roof that transitions into a shed-roof over the front porch. The porch is supported by wooden posts, and has separate entrances to each pen. Built about 1920, it is one of the modest number of box-frame houses in the county to survive from that period.

The house was listed on the National Register of Historic Places in 1992.

== See also ==
- National Register of Historic Places listings in White County, Arkansas
