= Arthur W. Woodson House =

Historic house in Arkansas, United States

- U.S. National Register of Historic Places
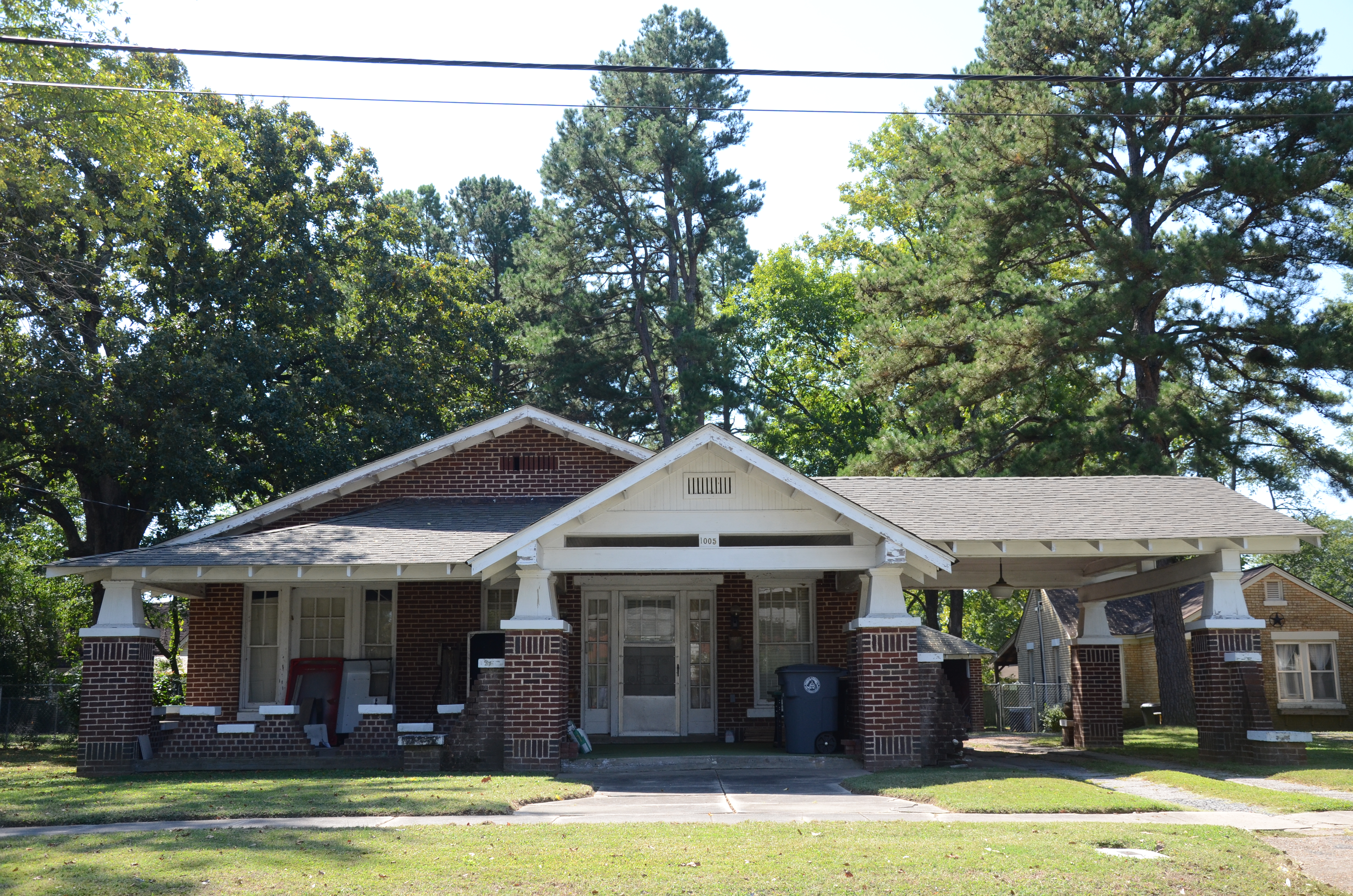

- Location within Arkansas Location within the United States
- Location: 1005 W. Arch Ave., Searcy, Arkansas
- Coordinates: 35°15′0″N 91°44′51″W
- Area: less than one acre
- Built: 1923
- Architect: Arthur W. Woodson
- Architectural style: Bungalow/craftsman
- MPS: White County MPS
- NRHP reference No.: 91001211
- Added to NRHP: September 5, 1991

The Arthur W. Woodson House is a historic house at 1005 West Arch Avenue in Searcy, Arkansas. It is a single-story brick building, with a broad gabled roof across its main section. A cross-gabled porte-cochere extends to the right, supported by brick piers, and a hip-roofed porch extends across the front, with a projecting gabled section in front of the entrance, making for a picturesque and irregular roof line. The house was built in 1923, and is considered one of the city's finer examples of Craftsman architecture.

The house was listed on the National Register of Historic Places in 1991.

== See also ==
- National Register of Historic Places listings in White County, Arkansas
