= Dalton Woodson House =

Historic house in Arkansas, United States

- U.S. National Register of Historic Places
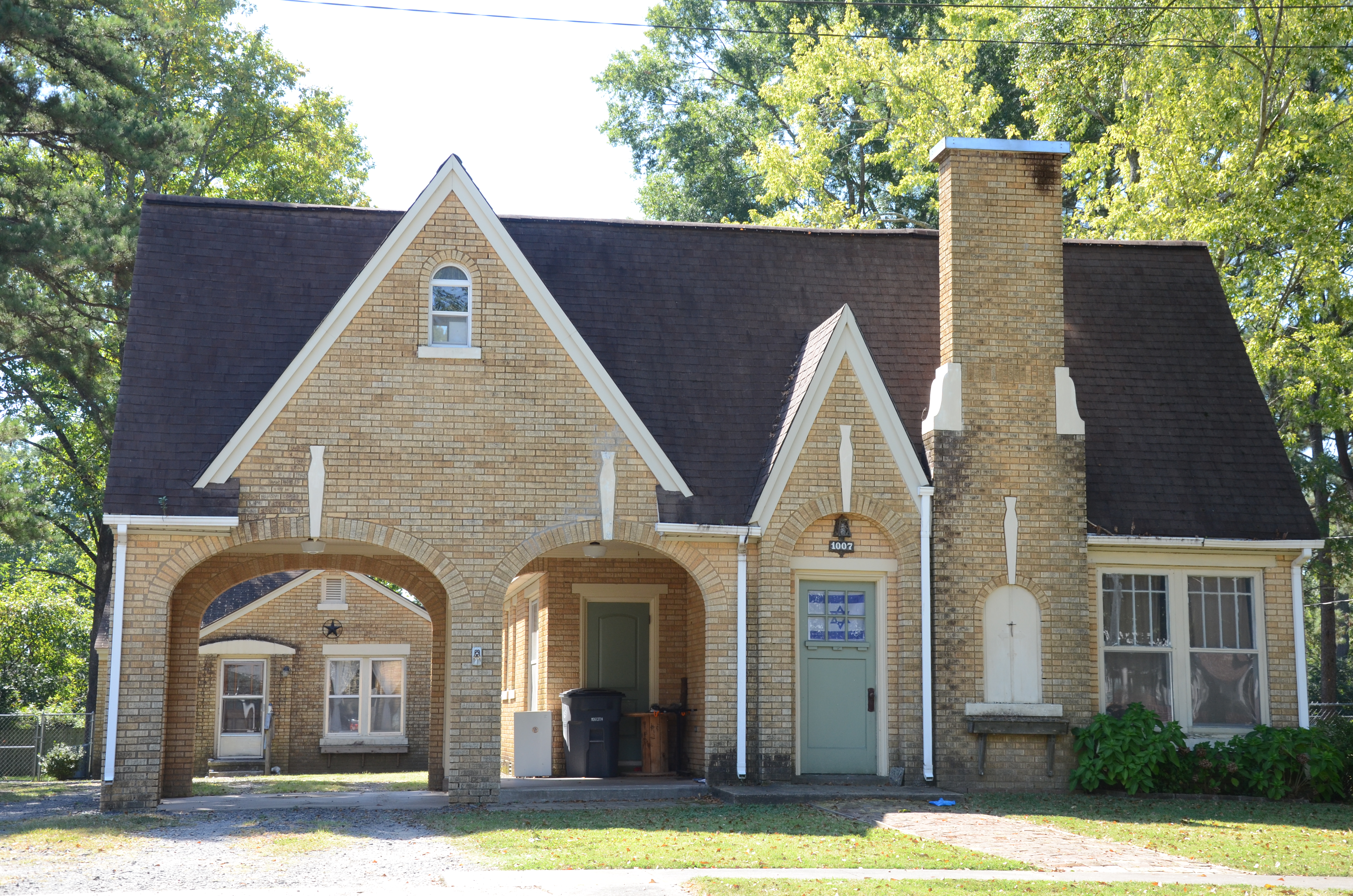

- Location within Arkansas Location within the United States
- Location: 1007 W. Arch Ave., Searcy, Arkansas
- Coordinates: 35°15′0″N 91°44′54″W
- Area: less than one acre
- Built: 1929
- Architect: Arthur W. Woodson
- Architectural style: Late 19th And 20th Century Revivals, English Revival
- MPS: White County MPS
- NRHP reference No.: 91001212
- Added to NRHP: September 5, 1991

The Dalton Woodson House is a historic house at 107 West Arch Avenue in Searcy, Arkansas. It is a single-story brick building, in a picturesque interpretation of English Revival architecture. It is a side gable roof that extends across a porte-cochere with an arched opening, set next to a similar arched opening providing access to a recessed secondary entry. A cross gable extends across the centers of these two arches, and there is a smaller and steeper arch above the main entrance, which is set between the right arch and a chimney with stepped stone shoulders. The house was built in 1929, and is one of the city's finest examples of English Revival architecture.

The house was listed on the National Register of Historic Places in 1991.

== See also ==
- National Register of Historic Places listings in White County, Arkansas
