= Arnold Farmstead =

Historic house in Arkansas, United States

- Formerly listed on the U.S. National Register of Historic Places
- Location within Arkansas Location within the United States
- Location: Off Maple St. S of Deener Cr., Searcy, Arkansas
- Coordinates: 35°15′20″N 91°44′32″W
- Area: 1 acre (0.40 ha)
- Architectural style: Bungalow/craftsman, Vernacular Craftsman
- MPS: White County MPS
- NRHP reference No.: 91001187

Significant dates
- Added to NRHP: September 13, 1991
- Removed from NRHP: January 26, 2018

The Arnold Farmstead was a historic farmstead near McRae and Maple Streets in Searcy, Arkansas. The farmstead included a Craftsman-style main house and a collection of outbuildings consisting of a chicken coop, privy, well house, and fruit cellar. The house was a 1 1/2-story wood-frame structure that was roughly T-shaped with additions. The south-facing front was sheltered by a full-width porch, which wrapped around the west side. Although suburban residences have encroached on its formerly rural setting, the complex of buildings, dating to the 1920s, was remarkably well-preserved.

The property was listed on the National Register of Historic Places in 1991. It has been listed as destroyed in the Arkansas Historic Preservation Program database, and was delisted in 2018.

== See also ==
- National Register of Historic Places listings in White County, Arkansas
