= Bloom House =

Historic house in Arkansas, United States

- U.S. National Register of Historic Places
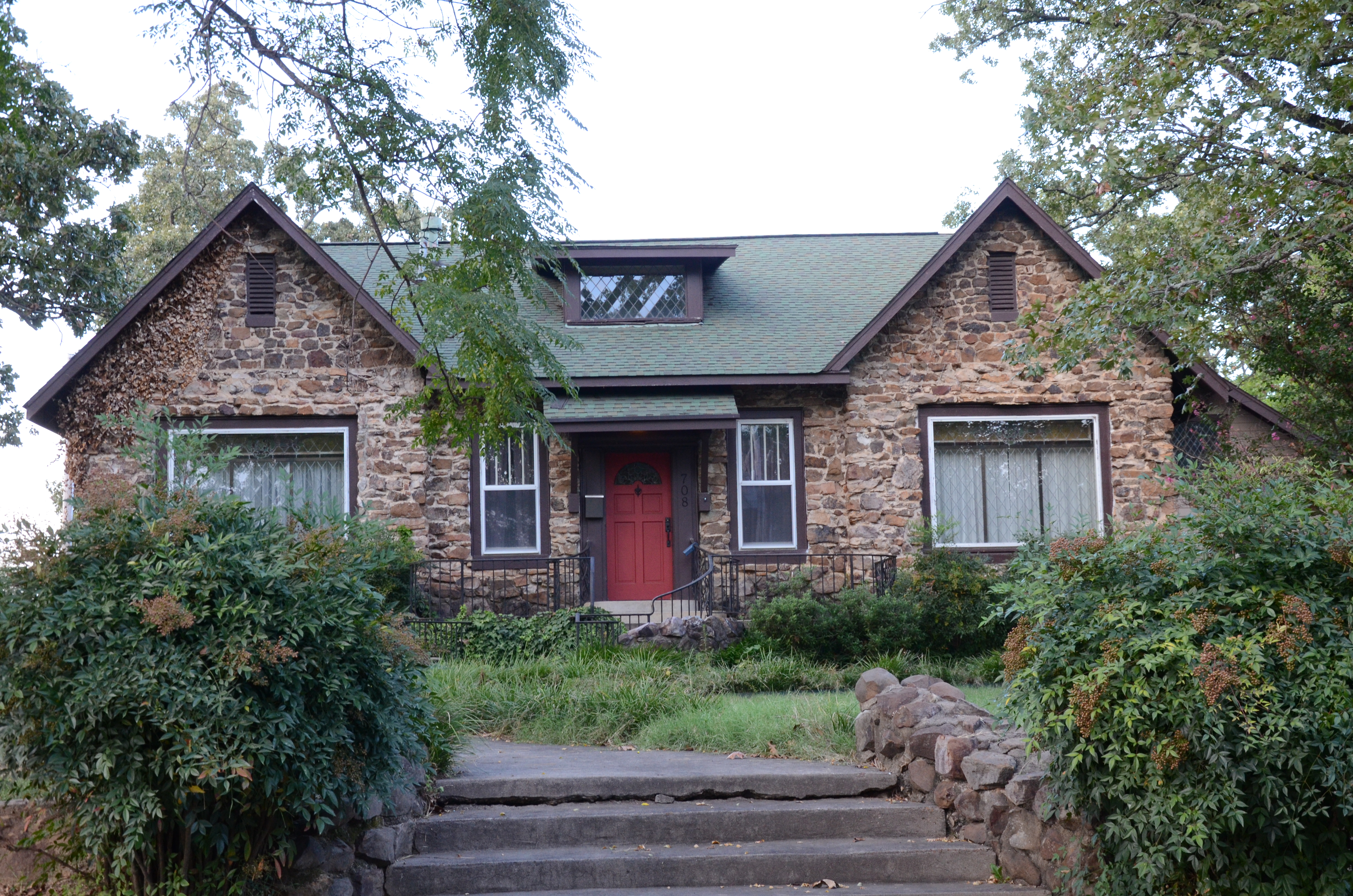

- Location within Arkansas Location within the United States
- Location: Jct. of N. Maple and Academy Sts., Searcy, Arkansas
- Coordinates: 35°15′10″N 91°44′41″W
- Area: 2 acres (0.81 ha)
- Built: 1930
- Architectural style: Bungalow/craftsman
- MPS: White County MPS
- NRHP reference No.: 91001176
- Added to NRHP: September 5, 1991

The Bloom House is a historic house at North Maple and Academy Streets in Searcy, Arkansas. It is a 1 1/2-story fieldstone structure, with a hip roof and two forward-facing projecting gable sections flanking its entrance. Its roof is finished in green tile, and a single brick chimney rises at the rear of the house. Built about 1930, it is a fine local example of the third stage of Craftsman styling executed in stone in the area.

The house was listed on the National Register of Historic Places in 1991.

== See also ==
- National Register of Historic Places listings in White County, Arkansas
