= Stipe Cotton Gin =

- U.S. National Register of Historic Places
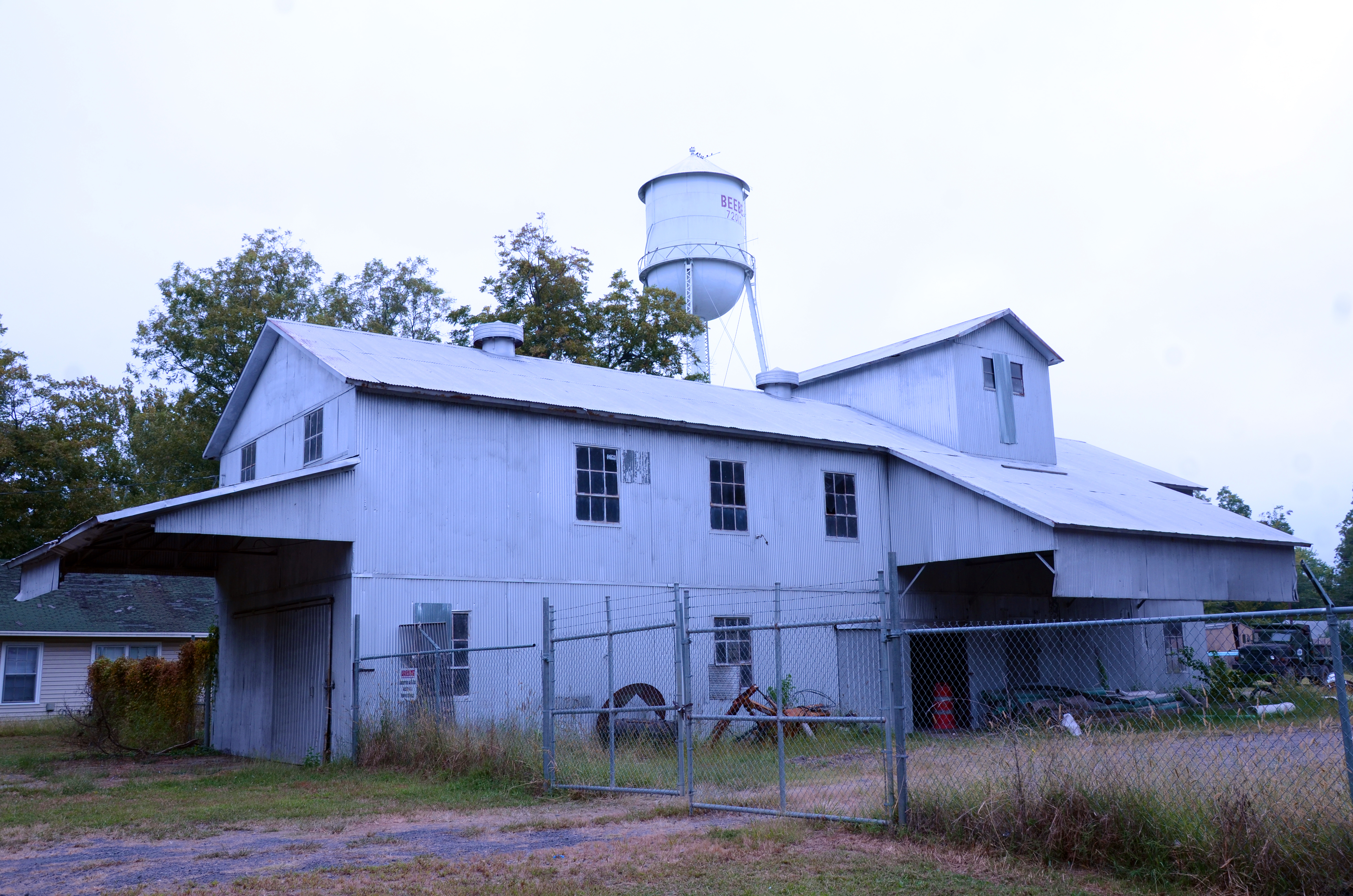

- Location within Arkansas Location within the United States
- Location: Jct. of Florida and Cypress Sts., Beebe, Arkansas
- Coordinates: 35°4′4″N 91°52′42″W
- Area: less than one acre
- Architectural style: Vernacular industrial
- MPS: White County MPS
- NRHP reference No.: 91001248
- Added to NRHP: July 20, 1992

The Stipe Cotton Gin is a historic cotton gin at Florida and Cypress Streets in Beebe, Arkansas. It is a two-story steel-framed structure, clad in corrugated metal, that houses the steam compressor and other equipment for processing and baling cotton. The complex also includes a seed storage building, and a circular structure of uncertain function. Built about 1930, it is one of only five to survive in White County from that period, when cotton production was locally at its peak.

The complex was listed on the National Register of Historic Places in 1992.

== See also ==
- National Register of Historic Places listings in White County, Arkansas
