= Porter Rodgers Sr. House =

Historic house in Arkansas, United States

- Formerly listed on the U.S. National Register of Historic Places
- Location within Arkansas Location within the United States
- Location: Jct. of N. Oak and E. Race Sts., Searcy, Arkansas
- Coordinates: 35°14′54″N 91°44′41″W
- Built: 1925
- Architect: Joe Knox
- Architectural style: Colonial Revival
- MPS: White County MPS
- NRHP reference No.: 91001230

Significant dates
- Added to NRHP: September 5, 1991
- Removed from NRHP: January 26, 2018

The Porter Rodgers Sr. House was a historic house at the junction of North Oak and East Race Streets in Searcy, Arkansas. It was a 1 1/2-story wood-frame structure, with a side-gable roof, weatherboard siding, and a concrete foundation. A cross-gabled Greek Revival portico, two stories in height, projected from the center of its roof line, supported by fluted square box columns. It was built in 1925, and was one of the city's best examples of high-style Colonial Revival architecture.

The house was listed on the National Register of Historic Places in 1991. It has been listed as destroyed in the Arkansas Historic Preservation Program database, and was delisted in 2018.

== See also ==
- National Register of Historic Places listings in White County, Arkansas
