= Morris Institute Dairy Barn =

- U.S. National Register of Historic Places
- Location within Arkansas Location within the United States
- Nearest city: Crosby, Arkansas
- Coordinates: 35°16′31″N 91°52′1″W
- Area: less than one acre
- Architectural style: Plain traditional dairy barn
- MPS: White County MPS
- NRHP reference No.: 91001332
- Added to NRHP: July 20, 1992

The Morris Institute Dairy Barn was a historic barn in rural White County, Arkansas. It was located on the campus of the Morris Institute, northwest of Searcy off Arkansas Highway 320. It was a two-story wood-frame structure, with a gable roof that was extended over a single-story extension on one side. Its internal arrangement was unusual, with a central drive that was intersected at one point by another drive extending into the shed section. Built about 1930, it was the county's best example of a Depression-era dairy barn.

The barn was listed on the National Register of Historic Places in 1992. It has been listed as destroyed in the Arkansas Historic Preservation Program database.

== See also ==
- National Register of Historic Places listings in White County, Arkansas
