= Mark P. Jones House =

Historic house in Arkansas, United States

- U.S. National Register of Historic Places
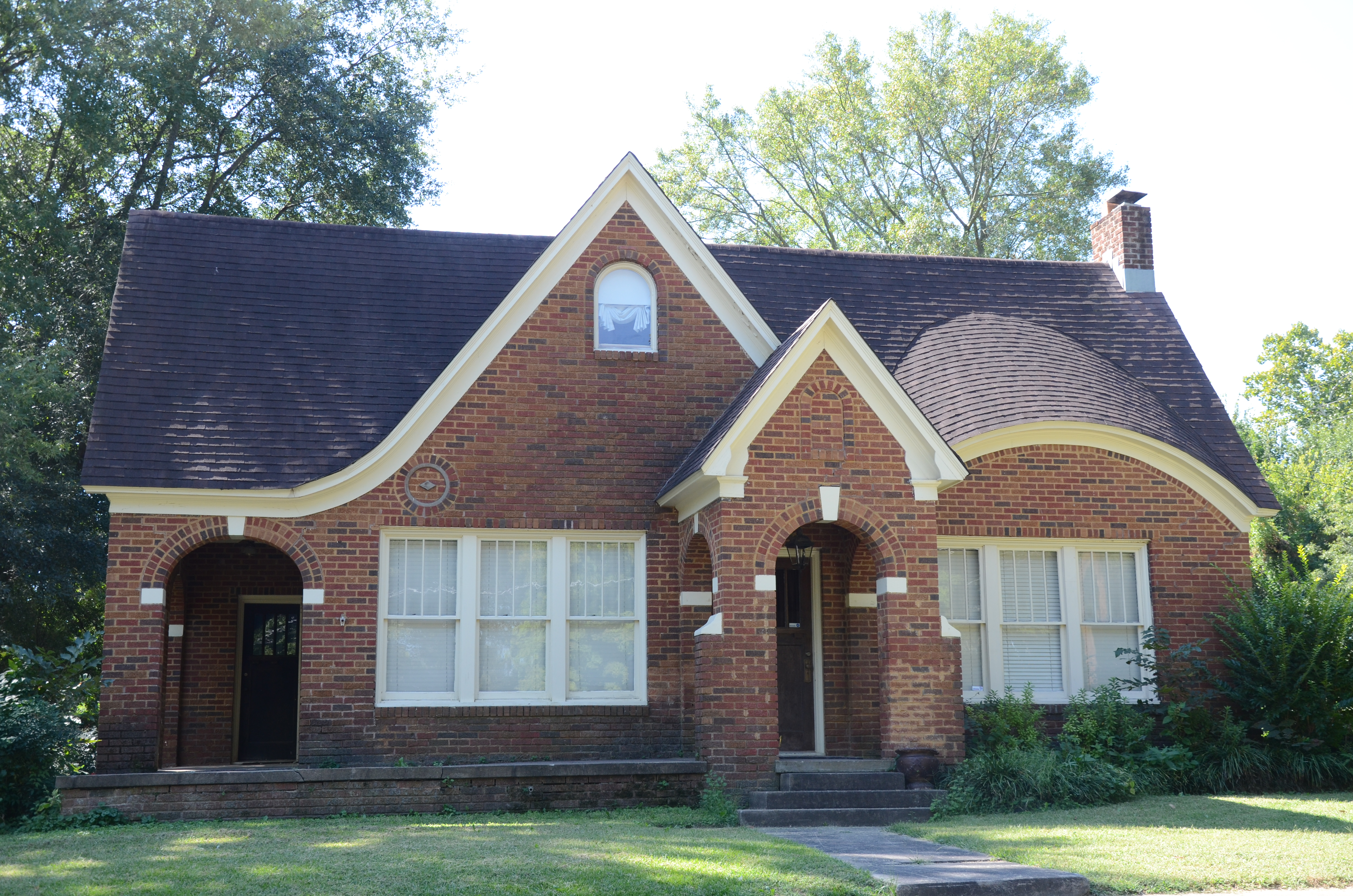

- Location within Arkansas Location within the United States
- Location: Jct. of Center and Fir Sts., Searcy, Arkansas
- Coordinates: 35°14′55″N 91°44′33″W
- Area: less than one acre
- Built: 1928
- Architectural style: Late 19th And 20th Century Revivals, English Revival architecture
- MPS: White County MPS
- NRHP reference No.: 91001197
- Added to NRHP: September 5, 1991

The Mark P. Jones House is a historic house at Center and Fir Streets in Searcy, Arkansas. It is a single story structure, with a wood frame clad in brick. It is basically rectangular, but has an asymmetrical arrangement of gables, projections, and recesses characteristic of the English Revival. It was built about 1928, and is a well-preserved local example of the style. It was for many years home to Mark P. Jones, a long-serving mayor of the city.

The house was listed on the National Register of Historic Places in 1991.

== See also ==
- National Register of Historic Places listings in White County, Arkansas
