= William Howell House, Storm Cellar =

- Storm Cellar, William Howell House
- U.S. National Register of Historic Places
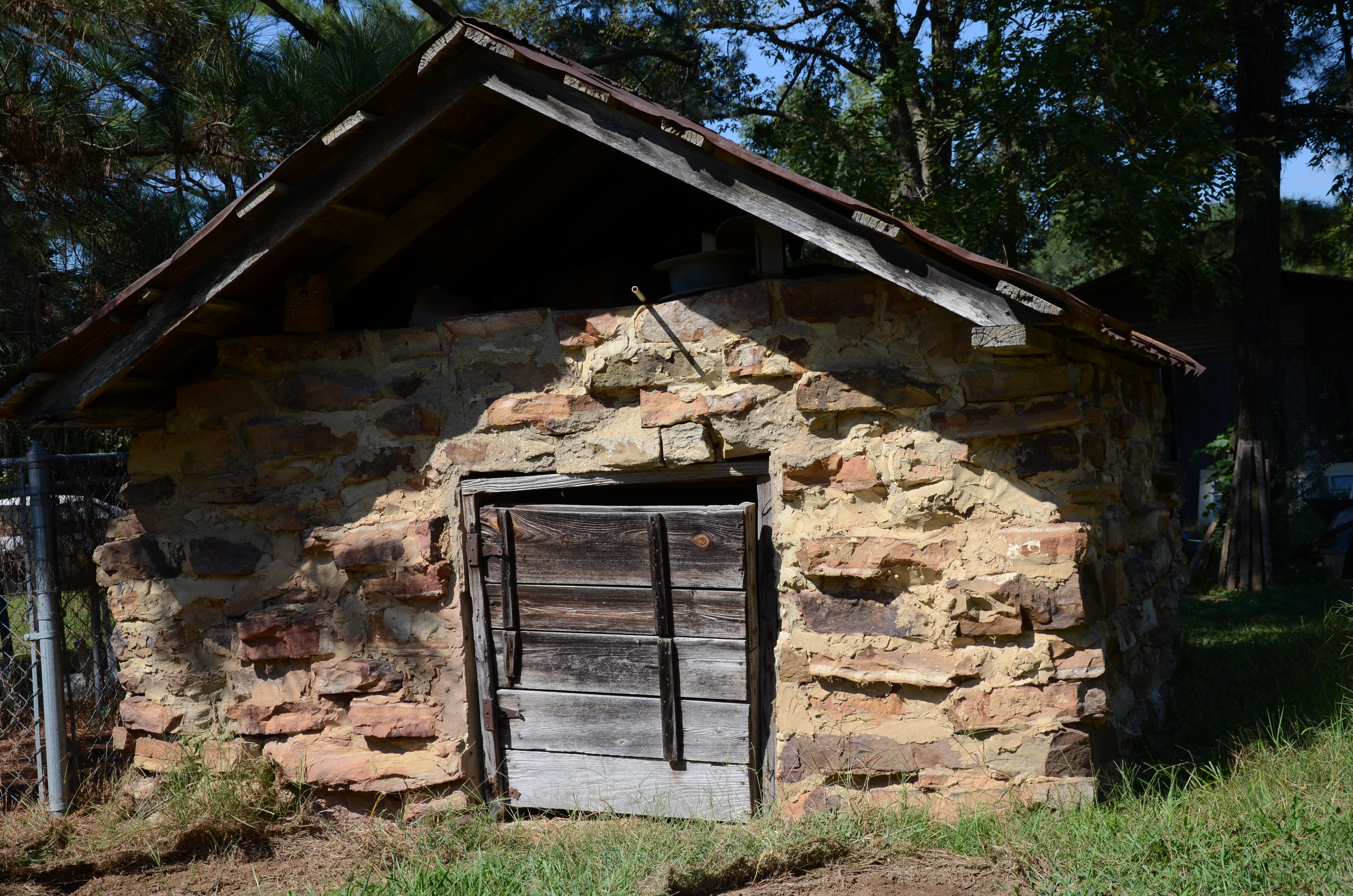

- Location within Arkansas Location within the United States
- Location: Co. Rd. 47 E of jct. with AR 305, Clay, Arkansas
- Coordinates: 35°23′47″N 91°47′6″W
- Area: less than one acre
- Architectural style: Rough-hewn fieldstone masonry
- MPS: White County MPS
- NRHP reference No.: 91001295
- Added to NRHP: July 20, 1992

The William Howell House Storm Cellar is a historic rural farm outbuilding in northern White County, Arkansas. It is located off County Road 47, east of its junction with Arkansas Highway 305, near the crossroads village of Clay. It is a low masonry structure, built of mortared local fieldstone and capped by a gable roof. It has a wooden door on one side, and no windows. It is estimated to have been built about 1930. Although its shape is more consistent with that of other buildings used for food storage, it is referred to locally as a storm cellar. It is the best-preserved of this type of building in White County.

The building was listed on the National Register of Historic Places in 1992.

== See also ==
- National Register of Historic Places listings in White County, Arkansas
