= Lizzie Garrard House =

Historic house in Arkansas, United States

- U.S. National Register of Historic Places
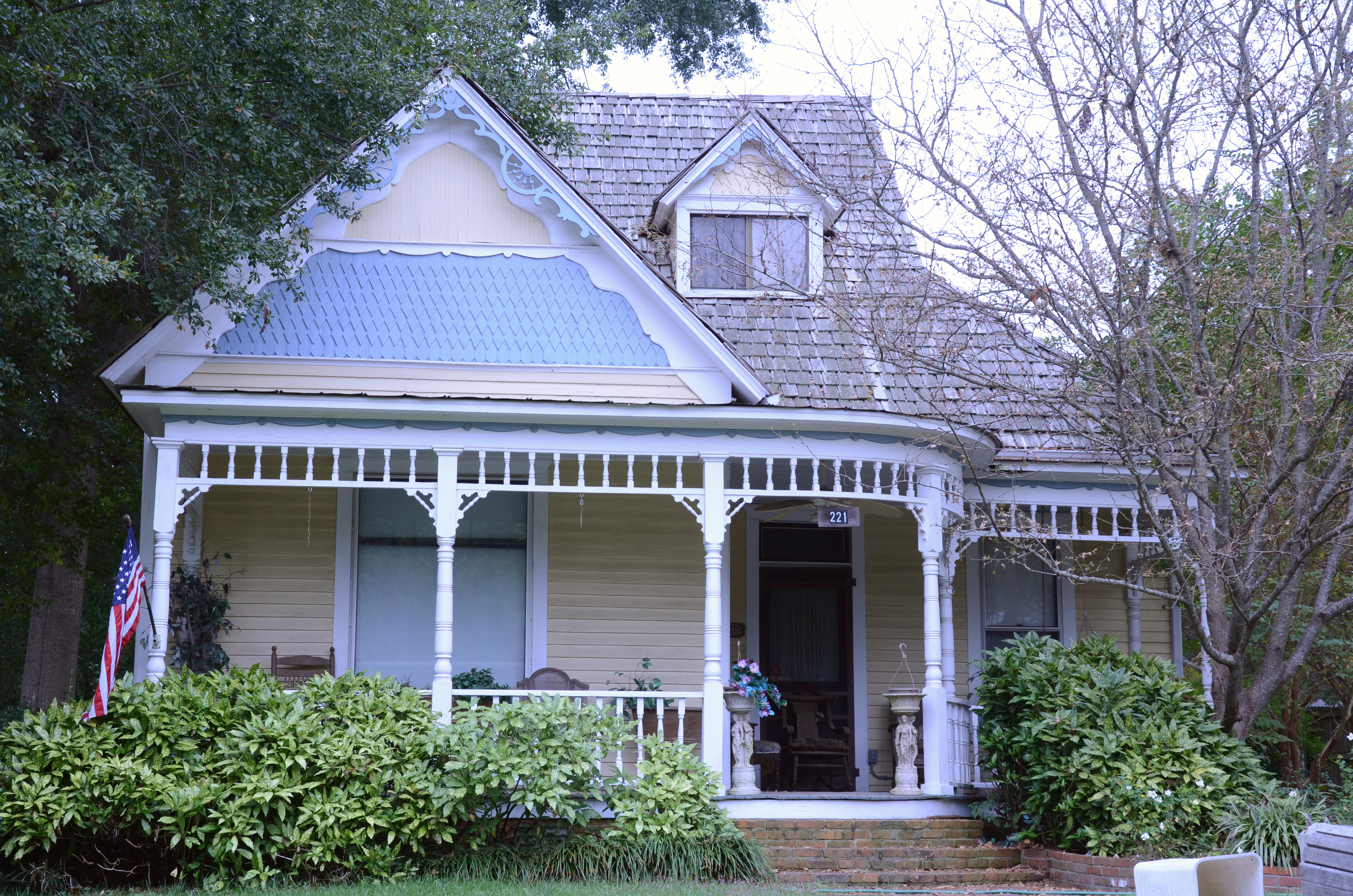

- Location within Arkansas Location within the United States
- Location: N. Cypress St., Beebe, Arkansas
- Coordinates: 35°4′17″N 91°52′59″W
- Area: less than one acre
- Built: 1906
- Built by: Oscar Rogers
- Architectural style: Folk Victorian
- MPS: White County MPS
- NRHP reference No.: 91001263
- Added to NRHP: September 5, 1991

The Lizzie Garrard House is a historic house on North Cypress Street in Beebe, Arkansas. It is a 1 1/2-story wood-frame structure, with a gable-on-hip roof that has a forward-projecting gable section. The gable end is finished in decorative cut shingles, with bargeboard along the rake edges. A porch wraps across the front, with turned posts and balusters, and a delicate spindlework valance. Built about 1906, it is a good local example of Folk Victorian architecture.

The house was listed on the National Register of Historic Places in 1991.

== See also ==
- National Register of Historic Places listings in White County, Arkansas
