= Thomas Jefferson Hale General Merchandise Store =

- U.S. National Register of Historic Places
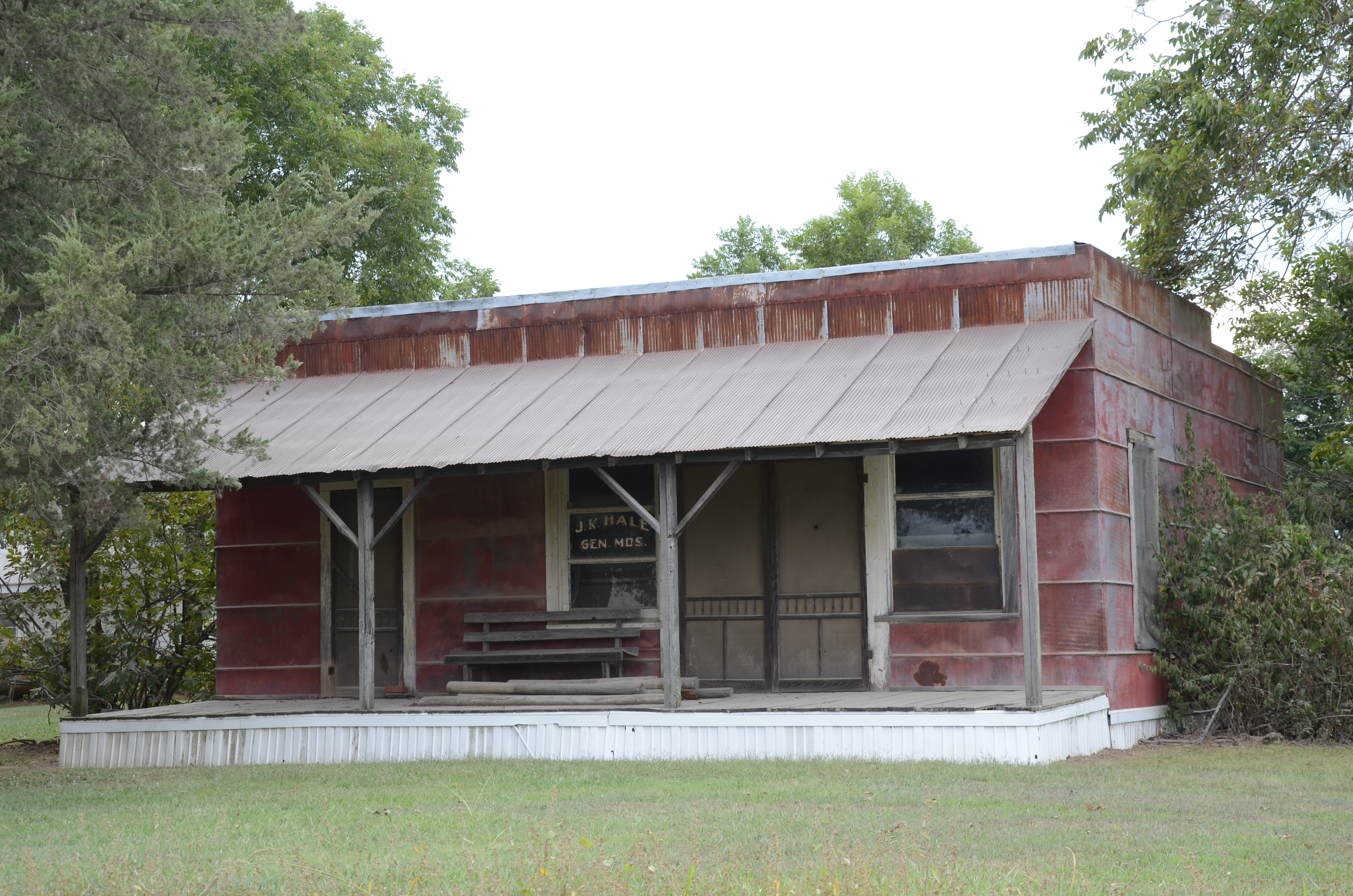

- Location within Arkansas Location within the United States
- Location: Jct of Co. Rds. 62 and 433, Vinity Corner, Arkansas
- Coordinates: 35°4′46″N 91°44′37″W
- Area: less than one acre
- Built: 1925
- Architect: Hale, Thomas Jefferson
- Architectural style: Vernacular commercial
- MPS: White County MPS
- NRHP reference No.: 91001358
- Added to NRHP: July 21, 1992

The Thomas Jefferson Hale General Merchandise Store is a historic commercial building in rural south-central White County, Arkansas. It is located south of Searcy, at the southwest corner of the junction of County Roads 62 and 433 (Rogers and West Vinity Roads), known locally as Vinity Corner. It is a single-story wood-frame structure, finished with sheet metal siding, instead of brick that was more typically used for commercial construction. Its front faces east, with three fixed windows flanking a double-door entry, and a shed-roof porch extending across its width. It was built about 1925, when the area was more prosperous than it is now, and is its only surviving commercial remnant.

The building was listed on the National Register of Historic Places in 1992.

== See also ==
- National Register of Historic Places listings in White County, Arkansas
