= Titus House =

Historic house in Arkansas, United States

- U.S. National Register of Historic Places
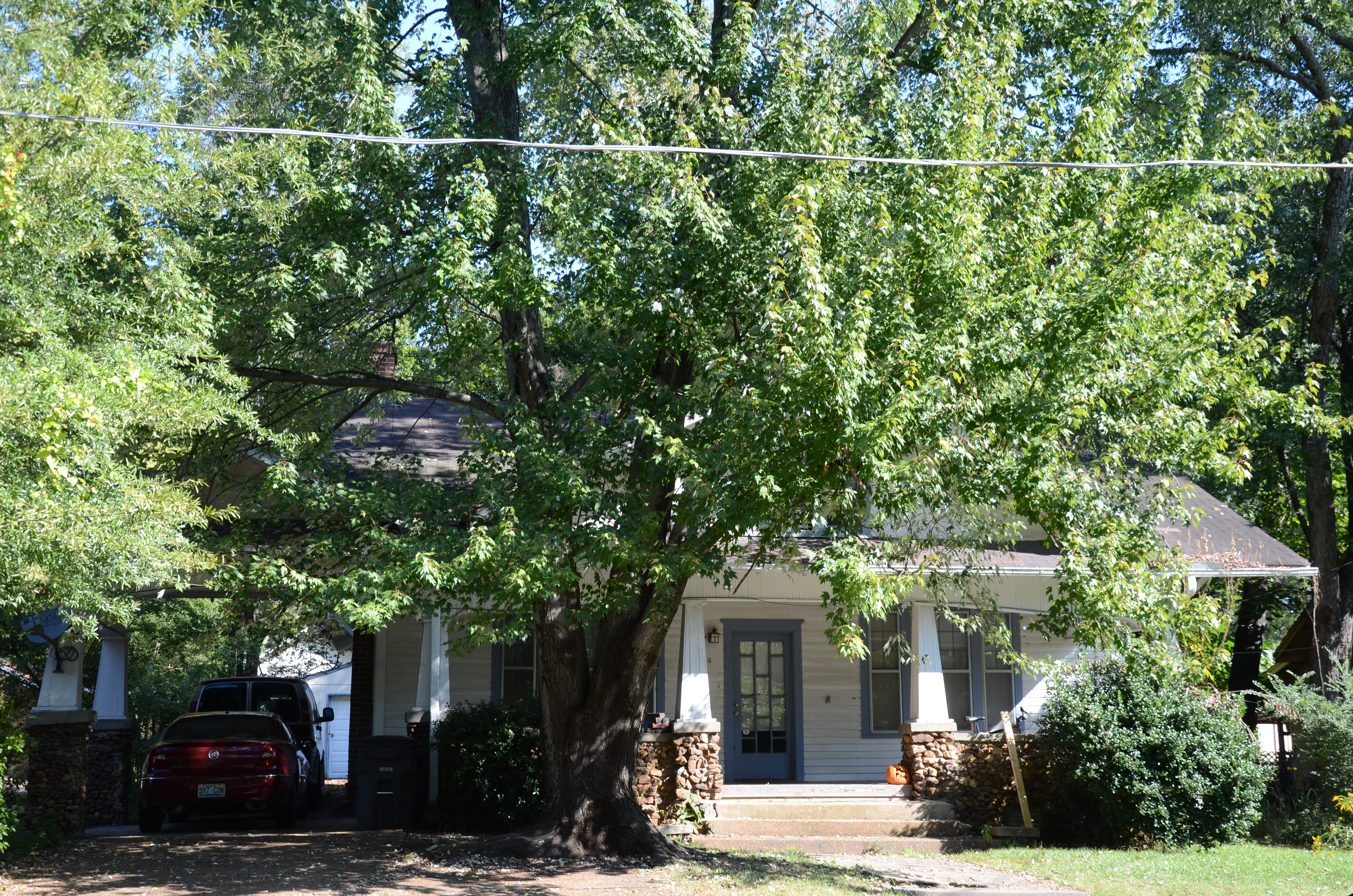

- Location within Arkansas Location within the United States
- Location: 406 E. Center St., Searcy, Arkansas
- Coordinates: 35°14′56″N 91°44′0″W
- Area: less than one acre
- Built: 1925
- Architectural style: Bungalow/craftsman
- MPS: White County MPS
- NRHP reference No.: 91001240
- Added to NRHP: September 5, 1991

The Titus House is a historic house at 406 East Center Street in Searcy, Arkansas. It is a single story wood-frame structure, with broad gable roof, walls clad in stucco and weatherboard, and a stone foundation. The roof's broad eaves have exposed rafter ends, and the gable ends feature decorative knee brackets. A cross gable rises above the recessed porch, which is supported by tapered square posts resting on stone piers. Built about 1925, it is a fine local example of Craftsman architecture.

The house was listed on the National Register of Historic Places in 1991.

== See also ==
- National Register of Historic Places listings in White County, Arkansas
