= Arkansas Highway 16 =

American state highway

Highway 16

Route information
- Maintained by ArDOT
- Existed: 1926–present

Section 1
- Length: 24.13 mi (38.83 km)
- West end: US 412 / AR 59 in Siloam Springs
- East end: I-49 / US 62 / US 71 / AR 16S in Fayetteville

Section 2
- Length: 71.67 mi (115.34 km)
- West end: I-49 / US 71 / AR 265 in Fayetteville
- East end: AR 7 in the Ozark National Forest

Section 3
- Length: 132.69 mi (213.54 km)
- West end: AR 7 / AR 123 at Sand Gap
- Major intersections: US 65 in Clinton
- East end: US 67B in Searcy

Location
- Country: United States
- State: Arkansas
- Counties: Benton, Washington, Madison, Newton, Pope, Searcy, Van Buren, Cleburne, White

Highway system
- Arkansas Highway System; Interstate; US; State; Business; Spurs; Suffixed; Scenic; Heritage
← AR 15	→ AR 17

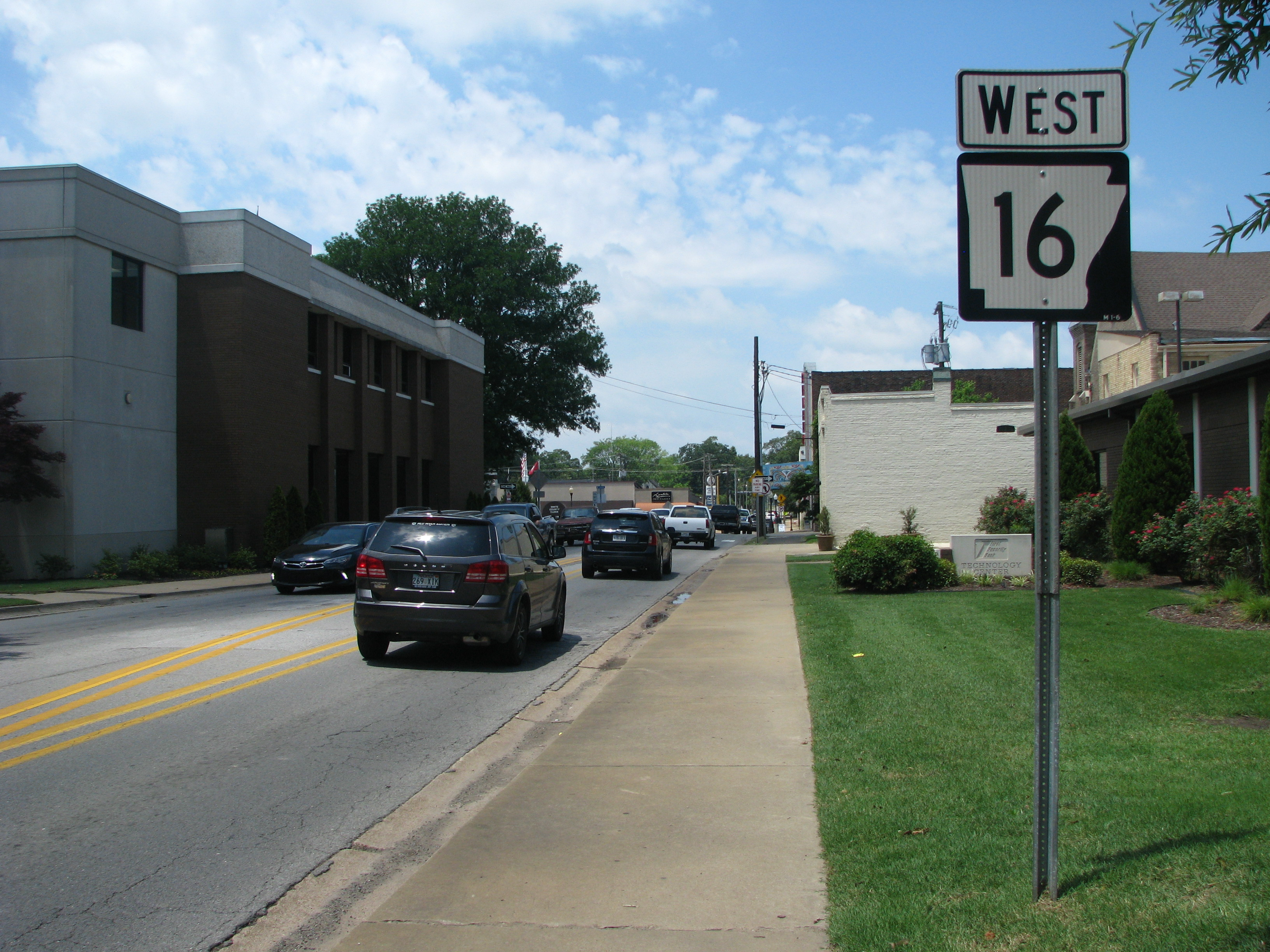
Eastern terminus of Highway 16 in Searcy, Arkansas.

Arkansas Highway 16 (AR 16) is a designation for three state highways in Arkansas. One segment of 24.13 miles (38.83 km) runs from U.S. Route 412 (US 412) in Siloam Springs east to Interstate 49 (I-49) in Fayetteville. A second segment of 71.67 miles (115.34 km) runs from I-49 in Fayetteville east to Highway 7 in the Ozark National Forest. A third segment of 132.69 miles (213.54 km) runs from Highway 7 at Sand Gap east to US 67B in Searcy. Highway 16 was created during the 1926 Arkansas state highway numbering, and much of the highway winds through the Ozarks, including the Ozark National Forest, where a portion of it is designated as an Arkansas Scenic Byway. The route has two spur routes in Northwest Arkansas; in Fayetteville and Siloam Springs.

== Route description ==
=== Siloam Springs to Fayetteville ===
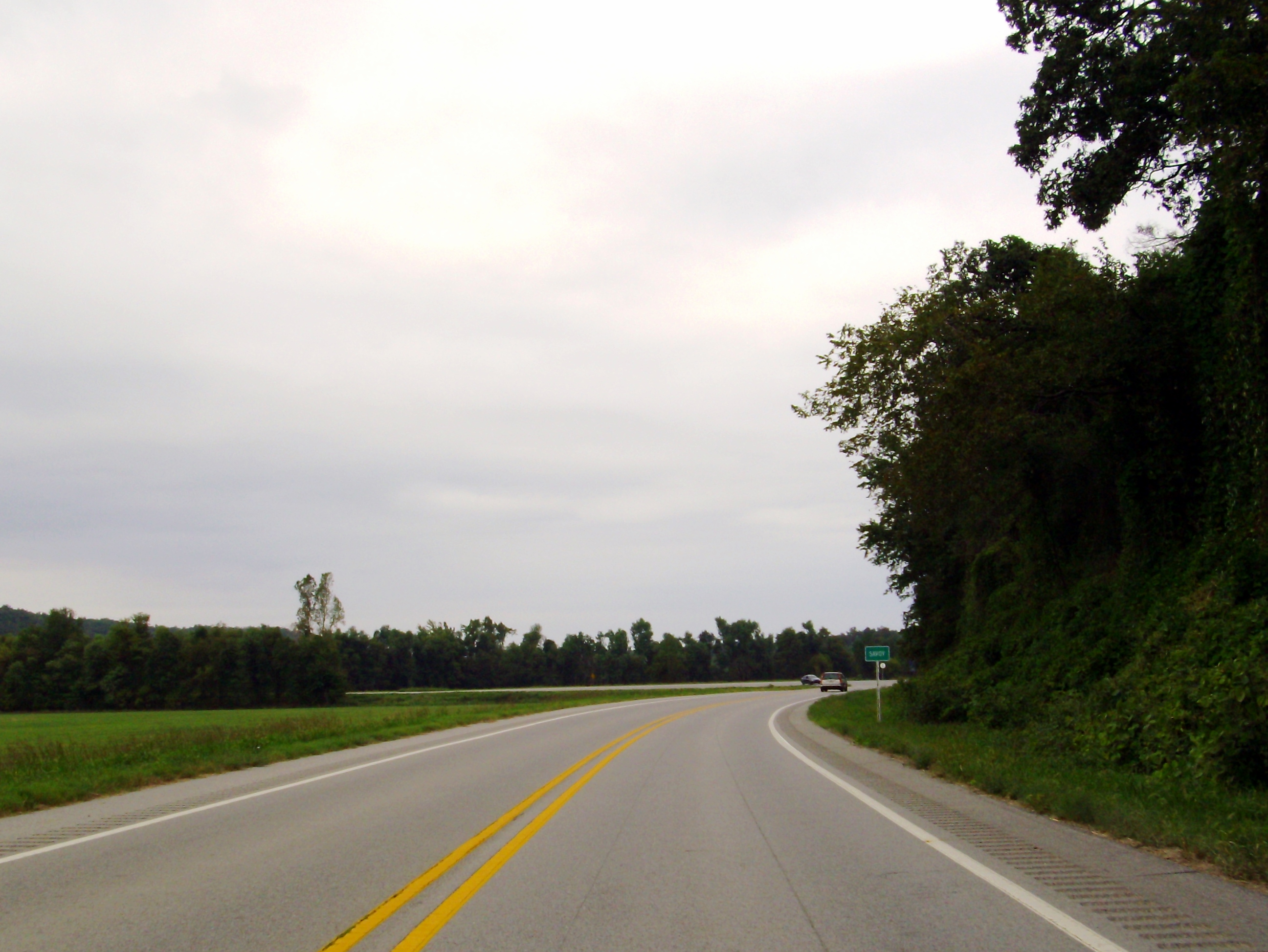
Highway 16 westbound near Savoy and the Illinois River

Highway 16 begins in Siloam Springs in Benton County, 3 miles (4.8 km) from the Oklahoma border. The highway's western terminus is US 412/Highway 59 in a commercial area; it runs south to Highway 16S (Kenwood Avenue). Highway 16 continues southeast, exiting the city and becoming a steep, winding road through the oak-hickory forest. Near the Washington County line, Highway 16 enters a small segment of the Ozark National Forest disconnected from the larger section of the forest north of Russellville. At the county line, Highway 16 serves as the eastern terminus of Highway 244, and briefly runs east along the county line as a section line road. In Washington County, Highway 16 continues east in the National Forest, serving the Lake Wedington Recreation Area, which contains the Lake Wedington Historic District, and crossing the Illinois River, the eastern boundary of the National Forest, near Savoy. It continues to wind through sparsely populated forested land, passing the unincorporated community of Wedington Woods before entering Fayetteville, the third-largest city in Arkansas and county seat of Washington County.

In west Fayetteville, Highway 16 becomes a four-lane highway with paved median, used as a two-way left turn lane (TWLTL), known as Wedington Drive. The highway is a principal arterial in the City of Fayetteville's 2011 Master Street Plan. A focal point of growth in the rapidly developing Northwest Arkansas region, the Wedington Corridor has been subject to much planning and discussion in Fayetteville over the years, subject to biannual neighborhood planning charrettes by a broad group of Fayetteville stakeholders. The area was annexed into Fayetteville in pieces beginning in 1967, with the combination of a variety of land uses and zonings resulting in rapid growth, heavy traffic congestion, and limited pedestrian facilities. Highway 16 meets I-49/US 62/US 71, where it continues as Highway 16S.

=== Fayetteville to Ozark National Forest ===
The route begins at I-49 and US 71 as a continuation of Highway 265 (Cato Springs Road) and runs north along Razorback Road to an intersection, where Highway 16 turns east onto Fifteenth Street. The highway has a junction with School Avenue (former US 71B), and shortly thereafter a signalized crossing of the Razorback Greenway near Walker Park before continuing east as a two-lane road. Highway 16 gives access to the Fayetteville Industrial Park before becoming Huntsville Road, serving as the southern terminus of Highway 265. In east Fayetteville, Highway 16 crosses Lake Sequoyah, and begins paralleling the lake's source stream, the White River, for approximately 35 miles (56 km) to its headwaters near Pettigrew.

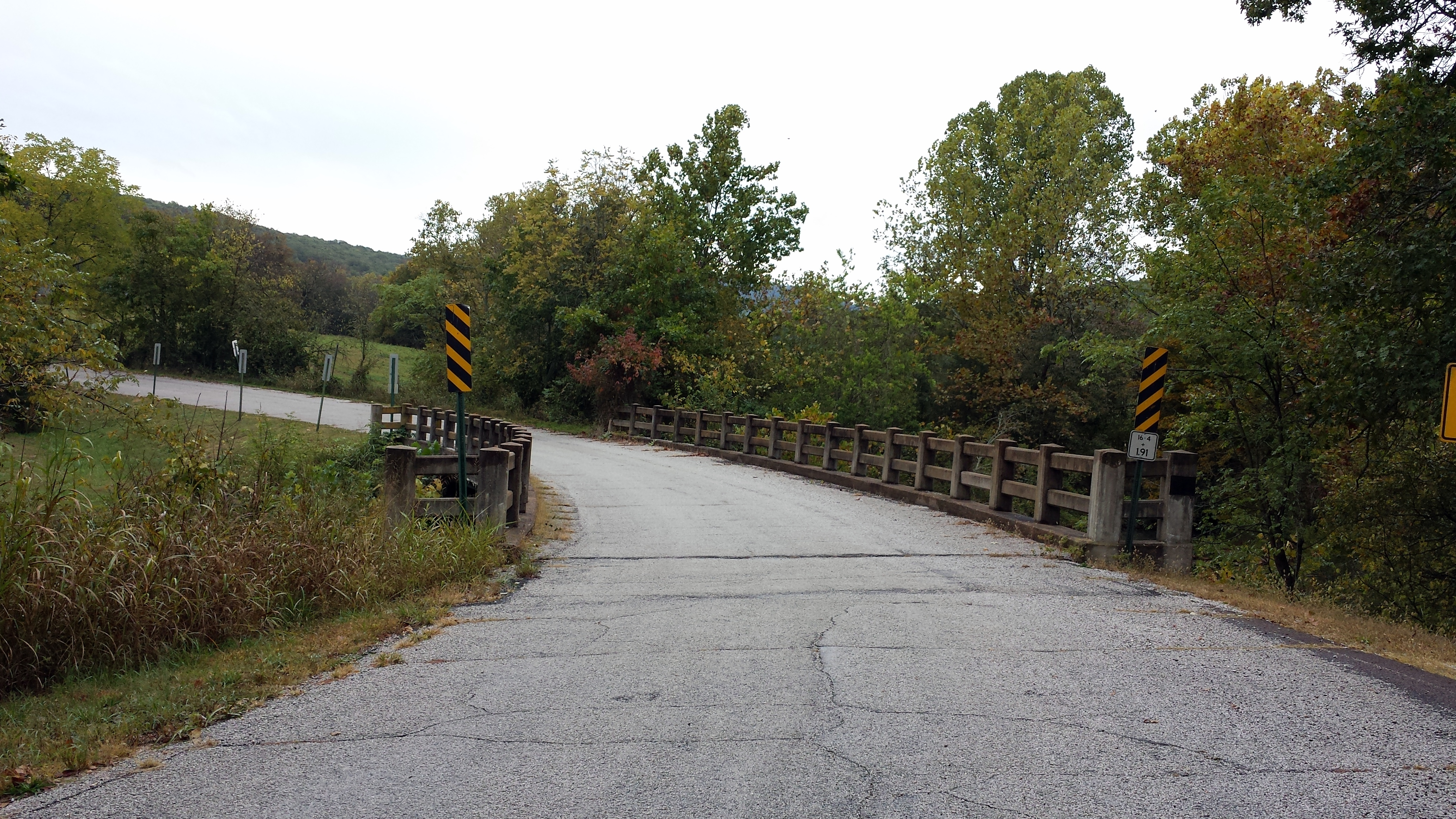
Former Highway 16 bridge over Cannon Creek, now listed on the NRHP

The route enters Elkins, serves as the terminus of Highway 74, and continues south past Stokenbury Cemetery, Elkins High School, the Elkins Public Library, and the Elkins School District Central Office before exiting the town heading southeast. Highway 16 passes through the unincorporated community of Durham before entering Madison County. In the sparsely populated county, Highway 16 winds eastward near Cannon Creek, where it passes a former alignment, including a former bridge listed on the National Register of Historic Places, before continuing through several unincorporated communities, intersecting segments of Highway 295 at Crosses and Combs before intersecting Highway 23 at Brashears. This junction is the northern terminus of the Pig Trail Scenic Byway along Highway 23, an Arkansas Scenic Byway. The two highways form a concurrency through St. Paul. Northeast of the town, Highway 16 breaks from Highway 23 to the east. The area is sparsely populated with little development; most structures are historic churches, schools, and community centers like Williams Farmstead the former Pettigrew School, both listed on the NRHP. Highway 16 serves as the northern boundary for the White Rock Wildlife Management Area (WMA) within the Ozark National Forest, with access to hunting, fishing, camping, and hiking from various county roads at Dutton, Pettigrew, Boston, and Red Star.

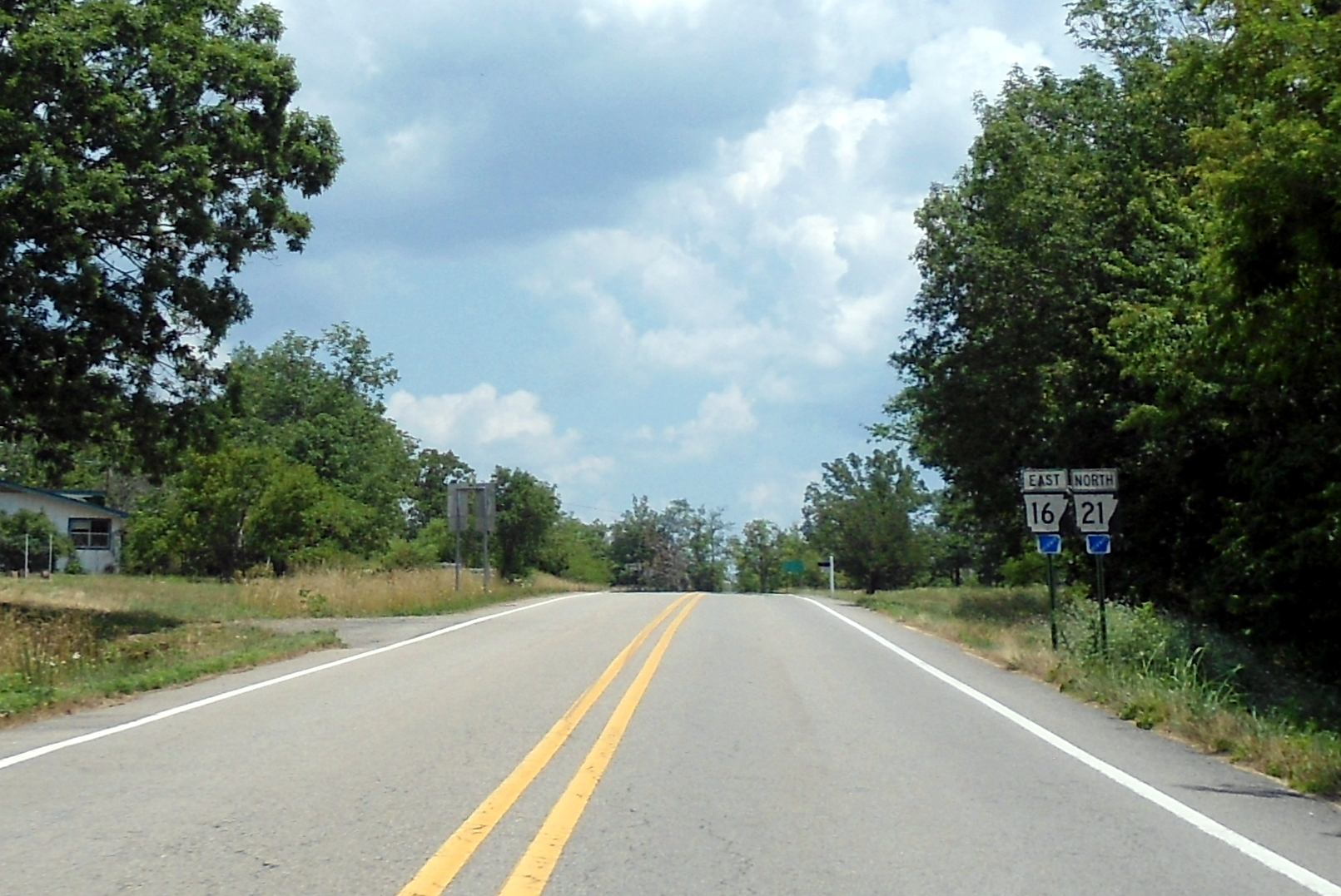
Highway 16 running concurrent with Highway 21 north of Fallsville as a segment of the Ozark Highlands Scenic Byway.

Shortly after entering Newton County, Highway 16 intersects Highway 21 at Fallsville, and the two routes begin a concurrency heading northeast. They pass the Glory Hole Trail, a popular waterfall at the end of a hiking trail along an old logging road, and the southern edge of the Upper Buffalo Wilderness, which contains the famous Hawksbill Crag hiking trail. The overlap is also designated as part of the Ozark Highlands Scenic Byway, a state scenic byway connecting the Ozark National Forest and the Buffalo National River. The concurrency ends at Edwards Junction, and Highway 16 continues east through forested land as the northern boundary of the Piney Creeks Wildlife Management Area (WMA), owned by the Arkansas Game and Fish Commission, and passing through Deer before a junction with Highway 7, where it terminates.

=== Sand Gap to Searcy ===
The route begins at Highway 7 and Highway 123 at Sand Gap in Pope County and runs east, briefly entering Newton County, returning to Pope County, and reentering Newton County to pass through Ben Hur, before returning to Pope County and running toward Raspberry. Highway 16 briefly runs north into Searcy County, exiting the Ozark National Forest and serving as the southern terminus of Highway 377. Immediately after reentering Pope County, Highway 16 intersects Highway 27, forming a concurrency south for 4.7 miles (7.6 km), where Highway 16 turns east to enter Van Buren County.

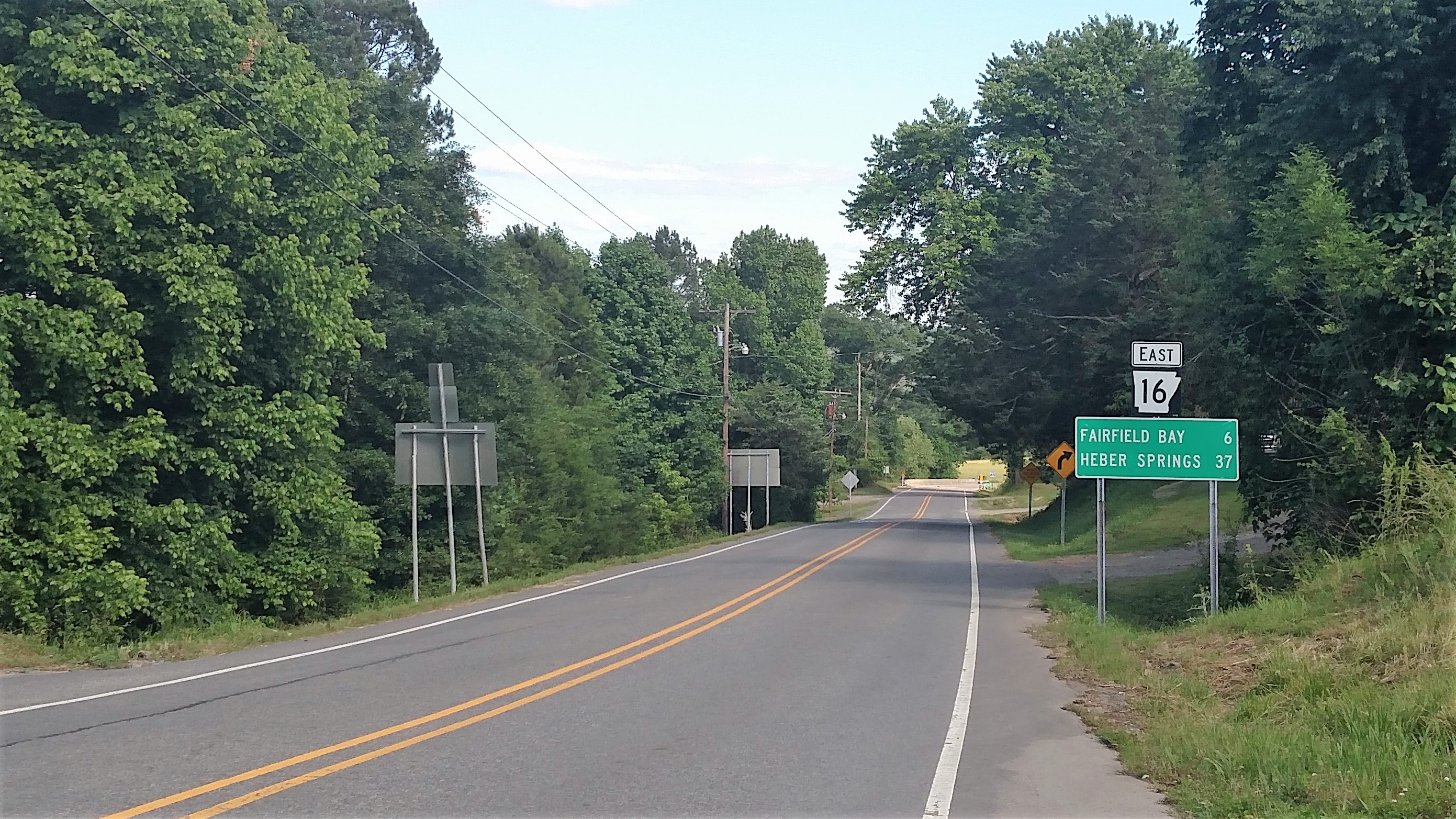
Highway 16 east of the Highway 9 overlap at Shirley

The route winds through rural areas, passing through Alread just north of the Gulf Mountain WMA, and ultimately entering Clinton. In the northern part of the city, Highway 16 intersects and forms a concurrency with US 65. After a bridge over Archey Fork (a tributary of the South Fork Little Red River), Highway 16 begins a concurrency with Highway 9 and turns east to an intersection with Highway 980, which provides access to Clinton Municipal Airport, and continue northeast to an intersection with Highway 110 near Shirley. In the city, Highway 9 splits north toward Mountain View, with Highway 16 running south to Fairfield Bay. An intersection with Highway 330 provides access to Van Buren Recreation Area and the Fairfield Bay Marina on Greers Ferry Lake. Highway 16 runs east along the northern edge of the planned community, serving as a main commercial thoroughfare in the community along the lake. Shortly after entering Cleburne County, the route turns south and crosses the upper section of Greers Ferry Lake. Across the lake, Highway 16 enters the City of Greers Ferry. It forms an overlap with Highway 92 southbound, where the routes intersect Highway 110 and Highway 336, and cross the lake again.

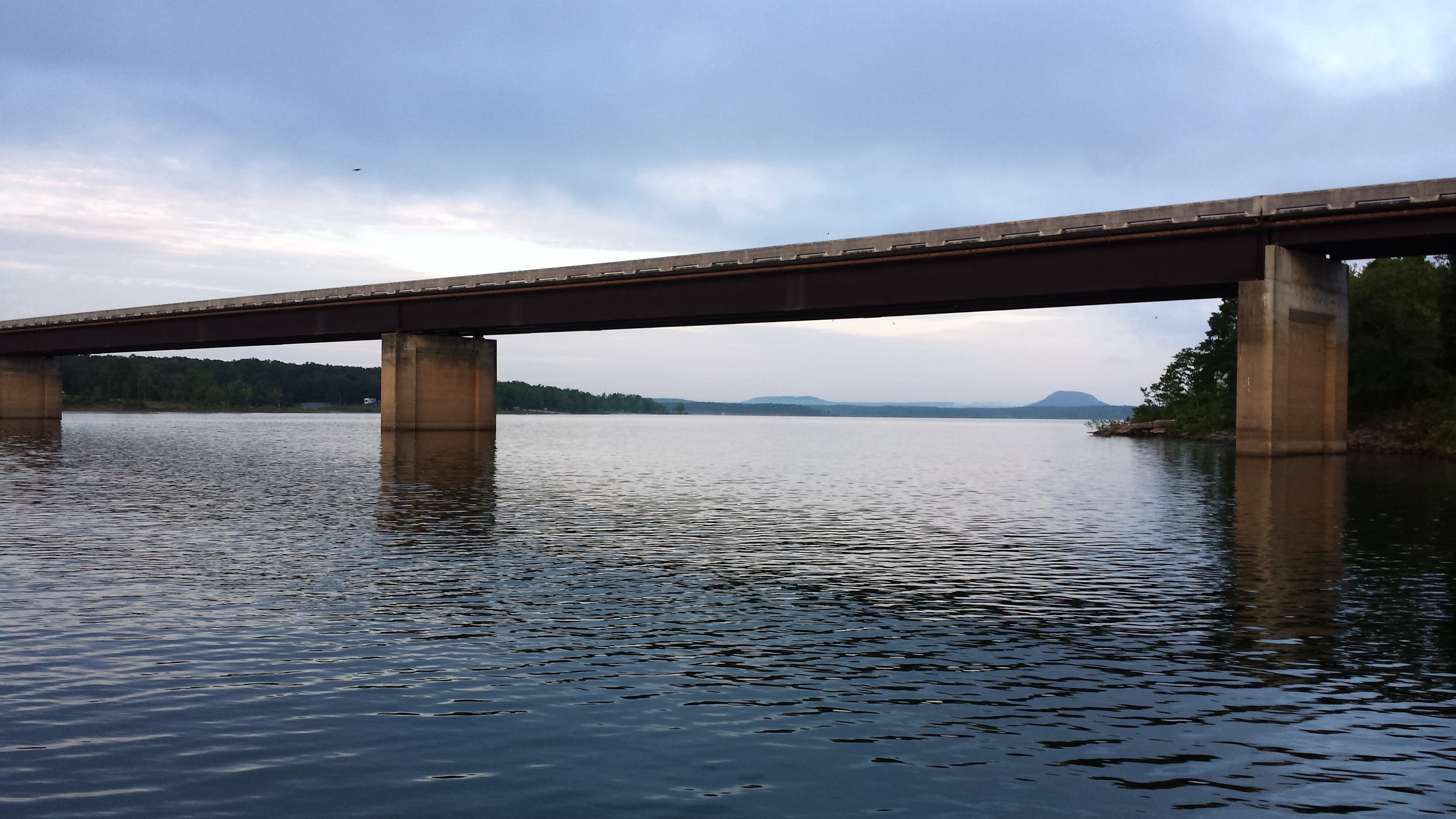
Highway 16 bridge over Greers Ferry Lake

Shortly after entering Cleburne County, the route turns south and crosses the upper section of Greers Ferry Lake. Across the lake, Highway 16 enters the City of Greers Ferry. It forms an overlap with Highway 92 southbound, where the routes intersect Highway 110 and Highway 336, and cross the lake again. At Whispering Springs, Highway 92 breaks from the concurrency; Highway 16 runs along the southwestern side of the lake, providing access to several parks and recreation areas. Highway 16 intersects Highway 25, which is concurrent with Highway 107. The three highways run northeast; Highway 107 turns north toward Eden Isle, and the two remaining routes form a concurrency with Highway 5 south of Heber Springs. Highway 5, Highway 16, and Highway 25 run together for 0.8 miles (1.3 km) before Highway 5/Highway 25 turn north, with Highway 16 continuing eastward to Pangburn.

In Pangburn, Highway 16 passes several historic homes, including the Walter Marsh House, John Shutter House, and the Austin Pangburn House before an intersection with Highway 124 (Searcy Street). Highway 16 turns south, passing the Churchill-Hilger House, James William Boggs House, Dr. McAdams House, and the Rufus Gray House before exiting town to the south. It passes the Albert Whisinant House on its way south to an intersection with Highway 305, near the Wesley Marsh House. Highway 16 also intersects Highway 310, which gives access to Letona to the west before entering Searcy, the county seat of White County, on the edge of the Central Arkansas region.

Highway 16 enters Searcy from the north, becoming Maple Street, and passing the historic Coward House. The highway crosses Deener Creek and the Searcy Bike Trail near Lions Stadium, home stadium of the Searcy High School football team. The highway curves due east, passing the Wood Freeman House No. 1 and Wood Freeman House No. 2 before becoming Race Avenue and entering downtown. Highway 16 runs as the northern edge of the town square, passing historic commercial structures, the American Legion Hall, and the Rialto Theater. After an intersection with Spring Street, Highway 16 passes the historic Cumberland Presbyterian Church and the Jesse N. Cypert Law Office to the north, and the headquarters of First Security Bank to the south. It runs east to Main Street, where the route terminates at US 67B. At the intersection, US 67B turns from Main Street to Race Street eastbound.

== Major intersections ==
Mile markers reset at some concurrencies.

County	Location	mi	km	Destinations	Notes
Benton	Siloam Springs	0.00	0.00	US 412 / AR 59 – Springdale, Gravette	Western terminus
Benton	Siloam Springs	0.50	0.80	AR 16S west (Kenwood Street) – Van Buren, Tulsa, OK	Eastern terminus of AR 16S
Benton–Washington county line		9.35	15.05	AR 244 west	Eastern terminus of AR 244
Washington	Savoy	14.66– 15.06	23.59– 24.24	Bridge over the Illinois River	
Washington	Fayetteville	24.13	38.83	I-49 (US 62 / US 71 / North Fulbright Expressway) – Fort Smith, Springdale	Exit 64 on I-49; former I-540
Washington	Fayetteville	24.13	38.83	AR 16S east (Wedington Drive) – Fayetteville	Continuation east; former AR 112S
Washington	Fayetteville	Gap in route			
Washington	Fayetteville	0.00	0.00	AR 265 south (Cato Springs Road)	Continuation south
Washington	Fayetteville	0.00	0.00	I-49 south – Fort Smith	Exit 60 on I-49; former I-540
Washington	Fayetteville			I-49 north / US 71 (South Fulbright Expressway) – Fayetteville, Springdale	Exit 61 on I-49; exit 60 on US 71
Washington	Fayetteville	3.50	5.63	AR 265 north (Crossover Road)	Southern terminus of AR 265
Washington	Fayetteville	9.00– 9.10	14.48– 14.65	Bridge over the White River	
Washington	Elkins	10.94	17.61	AR 74 east – Huntsville	Western terminus of AR 74
Madison	Crosses	23.93	38.51	AR 295 south	Northern terminus of AR 295
Madison	Combs	30.15	48.52	AR 295 north	Southern terminus of AR 295
Madison	Brashears	32.75	52.71	AR 23 south – Ozark	Western end of AR 23 concurrency
Madison		0.00	0.00	AR 23 north – Huntsville	Eastern end of AR 23 concurrency
Newton	Fallsville	25.84	41.59	AR 21 south (Ozark Highlands Scenic Byway) – Clarksville	Western end of AR 21 concurrency
Newton	Edwards Junction	0.00	0.00	AR 21 north (Ozark Highlands Scenic Byway) – Boxley	Eastern end of AR 21 concurrency
Newton		13.08	21.05	AR 7 – Jasper, Harrison, Dover, Russellville	Eastern terminus
Gap in route
Pope	Sand Gap	0.00	0.00	AR 7 / AR 123 south to AR 164 – Jasper, Harrison, Dover, Russellville	Western terminus; northern terminus of AR 123
Newton	No major junctions				
Pope	No major junctions				
Newton	No major junctions				
Pope	No major junctions				
Searcy	Witts Spring	25.86	41.62	AR 377 north – Snowball	Southern terminus of AR 377
Pope		30.77	49.52	AR 27 north – Marshall	Western end of AR 27 concurrency
Pope		35.28	56.78	AR 27 south – Russellville, Hector	Eastern end of AR 27 concurrency
Van Buren	Clinton	66.77	107.46	US 65 south – Clinton	Western end of US 65 concurrency
Van Buren	Clinton	0.00	0.00	US 65 north – Marshall AR 9 begins	Eastern end of US 65 concurrency; western terminus of AR 9
Van Buren	Clinton	0.5	0.80	AR 980 (Airport Road) – Airport	
Van Buren		8.99	14.47	AR 110 west – Botkinburg	Eastern terminus of AR 110
Van Buren	Shirley	9.56	15.39	AR 9 north – Shirley, Mountain View	Eastern end of AR 9 concurrency
Van Buren		11.49	18.49	AR 330 east	Western terminus of AR 330
Cleburne	Greers Ferry	22.17	35.68	AR 92 east – Drasco	Western terminus of AR 92
Cleburne	Greers Ferry	22.76	36.63	AR 110 east	Western terminus of AR 110
Cleburne	Higden	24.47	39.38	AR 336 west	Eastern terminus of AR 336
Cleburne	Whispering Springs	26.72	43.00	AR 92 west – Bee Branch	Eastern terminus of AR 92
Cleburne		30.95	49.81	AR 225 south – Quitman	Northern terminus of AR 225
Cleburne		38.57	62.07	AR 25 south (AR 107 south) – Quitman, Conway	Western end of AR 25/AR 107 concurrency
Cleburne				AR 107 north to AR 110 – Eden Isle	Eastern end of AR 107 concurrency
Cleburne				AR 5 south – Rose Bud	Western end of AR 5 concurrency
Cleburne		0.00	0.00	AR 5 north / AR 25 north – Heber Springs	Eastern end of AR 5/AR 25 concurrency
Cleburne	West Pangburn	9.55	15.37	AR 337 north	Southern terminus of AR 337
White	Pangburn	13.14	21.15	AR 124 east – Pleasant Plains	Western terminus of AR 124
White		17.56	28.26	AR 305 north – Clay	Southern terminus of AR 305
White		19.01	30.59	AR 310 west – Letona	Eastern terminus of AR 310
White		25.48	41.01	AR 13	Former AR 371
White	Searcy	27.35	44.02	US 67B (Race Street / Main Street)	Eastern terminus
1.000 mi = 1.609 km; 1.000 km = 0.621 mi: Concurrency terminus

== Fayetteville spur ==
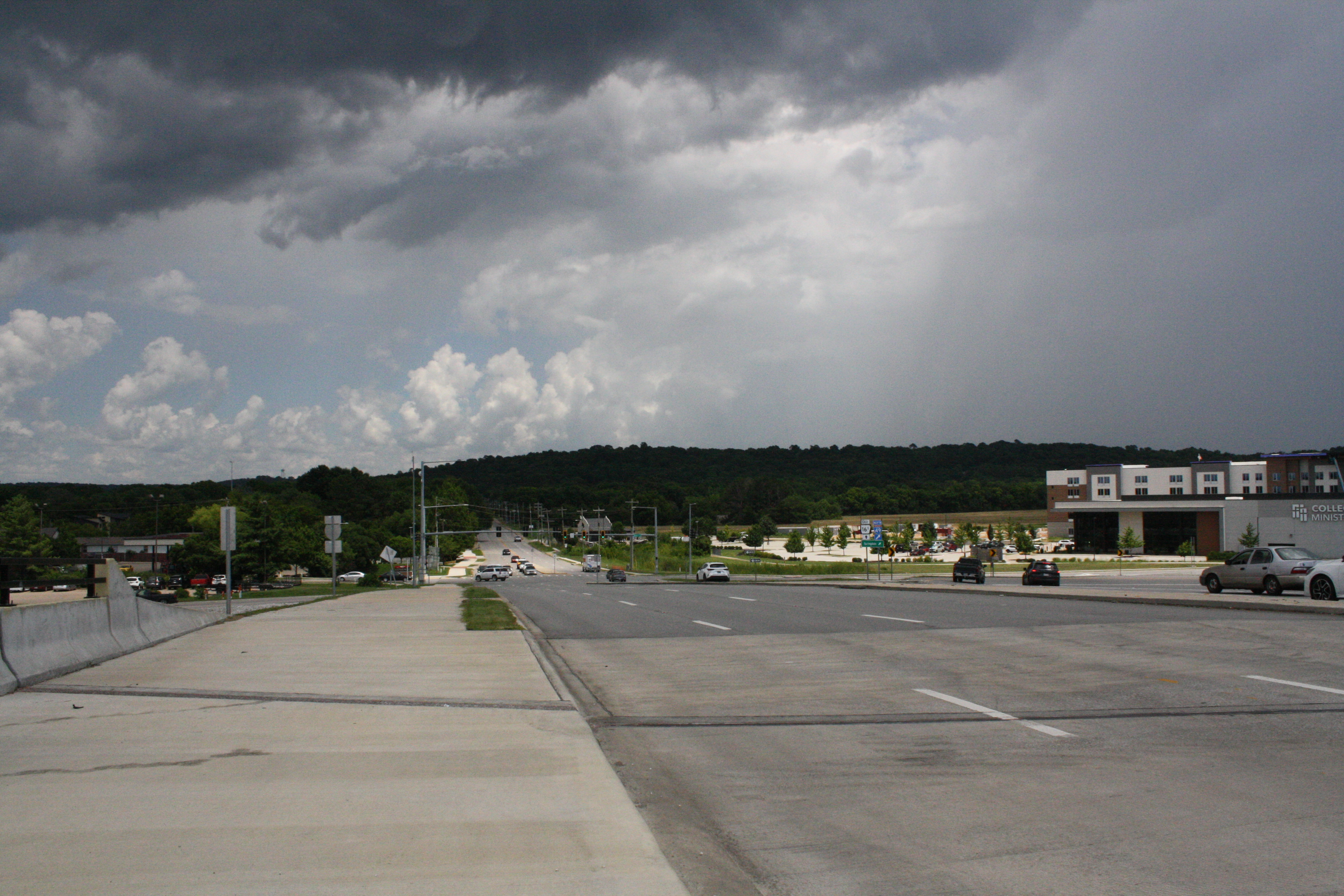
Wedington Drive (AR 16S) eastbound from I-49 junction in Fayetteville

Highway 16S
- Location: Fayetteville
- Length: 1.46 mi (2.35 km)
- Existed: c. 1971–present

Arkansas Highway 16 Spur is a 1.46-mile-long (2.35 km) highway in Fayetteville. Locally known as Wedington Drive, it begins at I-49/US 62/US 71 as a continuation of Highway 16 and runs east to Highway 112 (Garland Avenue).

The route was designated as a state highway spur route around 1971, known as Highway 112S. It was renumbered to Highway 16S in 2020 as part of a truncation of Highway 112 in Fayetteville.

== Siloam Springs spur ==
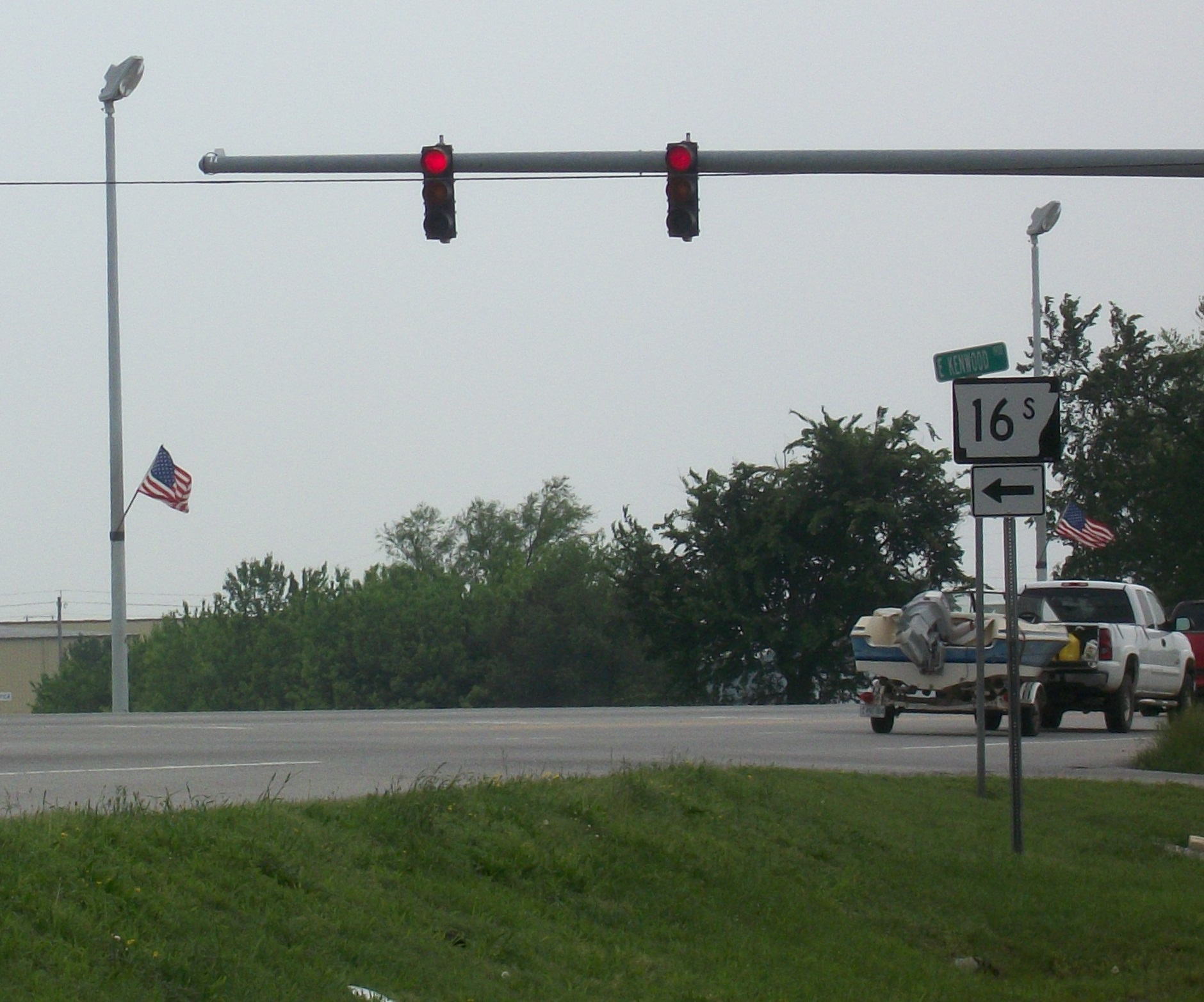
Highway 16S ends at US 412/Highway 59 in Siloam Springs.

Highway 16S
- Location: Siloam Springs
- Length: 0.43 mi (690 m)
- Existed: 1970s–present

Arkansas Highway 16 Spur is an east–west state highway spur route in Siloam Springs. The route of 0.43 miles (0.69 km) runs from US 412/Highway 59 east to Highway 16. Locally posted as East Kenwood Road, it serves as a short connector route for traffic eastbound on US 412 to access eastbound Highway 16 or for traffic westbound on Highway 16 to access westbound US 412.

== See also ==
- Old Highway 16 Bridge, historic bridge along a former alignment of Highway 16 in the Edgemont vicinity
