= Pettigrew =

Pettigrew, also spelt Pettigru, may refer to:

== People ==
- Andrew Pettigrew (born 1944), British academic
- Antonio Pettigrew (1967–2010), American sprinter
- Belle L. Pettigrew (1839–1912), American educator, missionary
- Brandon Pettigrew (born 1985), American football player
- Damian Pettigrew (born 1963), Canadian filmmaker
- Eric Pettigrew (born 1960), American politician
- J. Johnston Pettigrew (1828–1863), American general
- Jack Pettigrew (1943–2019), Australian neuroscientist
- James Bell Pettigrew (1832–1908), Scottish naturalist and museum curator
- James L. Petigru (1789–1863), American lawyer and politician
- John Pettigrew (disambiguation), multiple people
- Michael Pettigrew (born 1985), Australian rules footballer
- Peter Pettigrew (born 1950), Australian rules footballer
- Pierre Pettigrew (born 1951), Canadian politician
- Richard F. Pettigrew (1848–1926), American politician
- Samuel Pettigrew (died 1841), American politician
- Stanley Pettigrew (1927–2022), Irish painter
- Thomas Pettigrew (1791–1865), English surgeon and Egyptologist
- Tom Pettigrew (born 1936), Scottish footballer
- William Pettigrew (politician) (1825–1906), mayor of Brisbane, Queensland, Australia and member of the Legislative Council of Queensland
- William Pettigrew (missionary), British Christian missionary
- Willie Pettigrew (born 1953), Scottish football player

=== Fictional characters ===
- Francis Pettigrew, a barrister-cum-sleuth invented by crime writer Cyril Hare
- Peter Pettigrew (character), a character in Harry Potter
- Oliver Pettigrew, assistant headmaster in the television series Whack-O!
- Sheriff "Muletrain" Pettigrew, a character from The Buford Files

== Places ==
=== United States ===
- Pettigrew, Arkansas, an unincorporated community
- Pettigrew Barns, a two historic barns in Flandreau, South Dakota
- Pettigrew Home & Museum, a historic house museum in Sioux Falls, South Dakota
- Pettigrew House, a historic house in Palo Alto, California
- Pettigrew School, a historic school in Pettigrew, Arkansas
- Pettigrew State Park, a state park in North Carolina
- Pettigrew Wildlife Management Area, a protected area in Virginia

=== Elsewhere ===
- Pettigrew Green Arena, an indoor sports arena in Napier, Hawke's Bay
- Pettigrew Scarp, an escarpment on Annenkov Island in South Georgia and the South Sandwich Islands

== See also ==
- Lola Petticrew (born 1995), Northern Irish actor
