= KCCA =

KCCA may refer to:

- Clinton Municipal Airport (Arkansas) (ICAO code KCCA)
- KCCA-LP, a low-power radio station (92.1 FM) licensed to Anthony, Kansas, United States
- Kampala Capital City Authority, a legal entity responsible for managing Kampala, Uganda
- Kampala Capital City Authority FC, a football club
- Karachi City Cricket Association, Sindh, Pakistan
- Kettle Creek Conservation Authority, a regulatory body that manages Kettle Creek in Ontario, Canada
- Kernel canonical correlation analysis, an extension of standard Canonical Correlation Analysis.
