= Wesley Marsh House =

Historic house in Arkansas, United States

- U.S. National Register of Historic Places
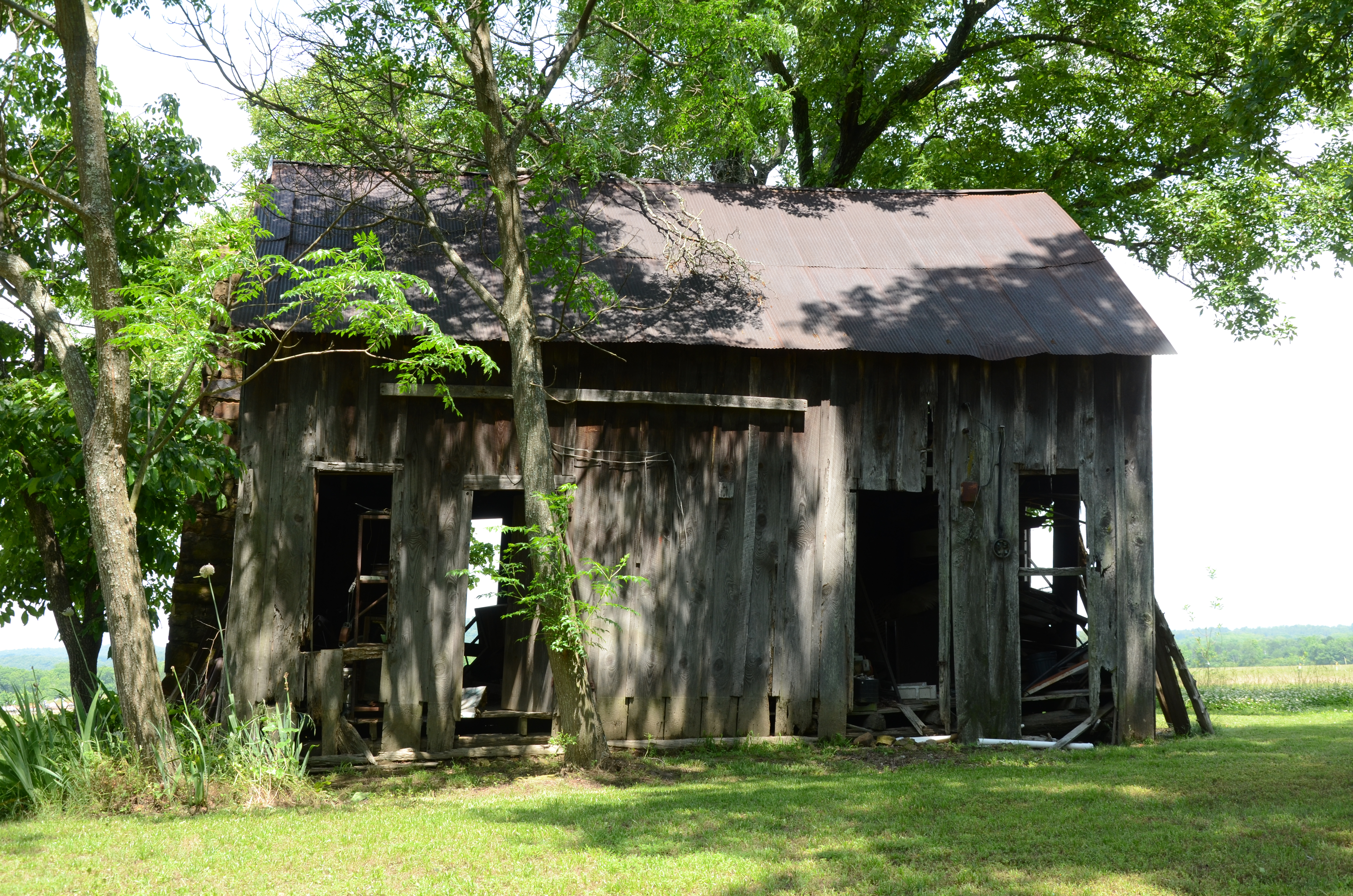

- Location within Arkansas Location within the United States
- Nearest city: Letona, Arkansas
- Coordinates: 35°22′19″N 91°48′33″W
- Area: less than one acre
- Architectural style: Vernacular hall and parlor
- MPS: White County MPS
- NRHP reference No.: 91001328
- Added to NRHP: July 20, 1992

The Wesley Marsh House is a historic house in rural northern White County, Arkansas. It is located northeast of Letona, about 0.25 miles (0.40 km) northwest of the junction of Arkansas Highways 16 and 305. It is a 1 1/2-story wood-frame structure, with a side-gable roof that descends on one side to a shed-roofed porch. The exterior is clad in board-and-batten siding, and the foundation consists of stone piers. Built about 1900, it is one of the county's few surviving houses from the period.

The house was listed on the National Register of Historic Places in 1992.

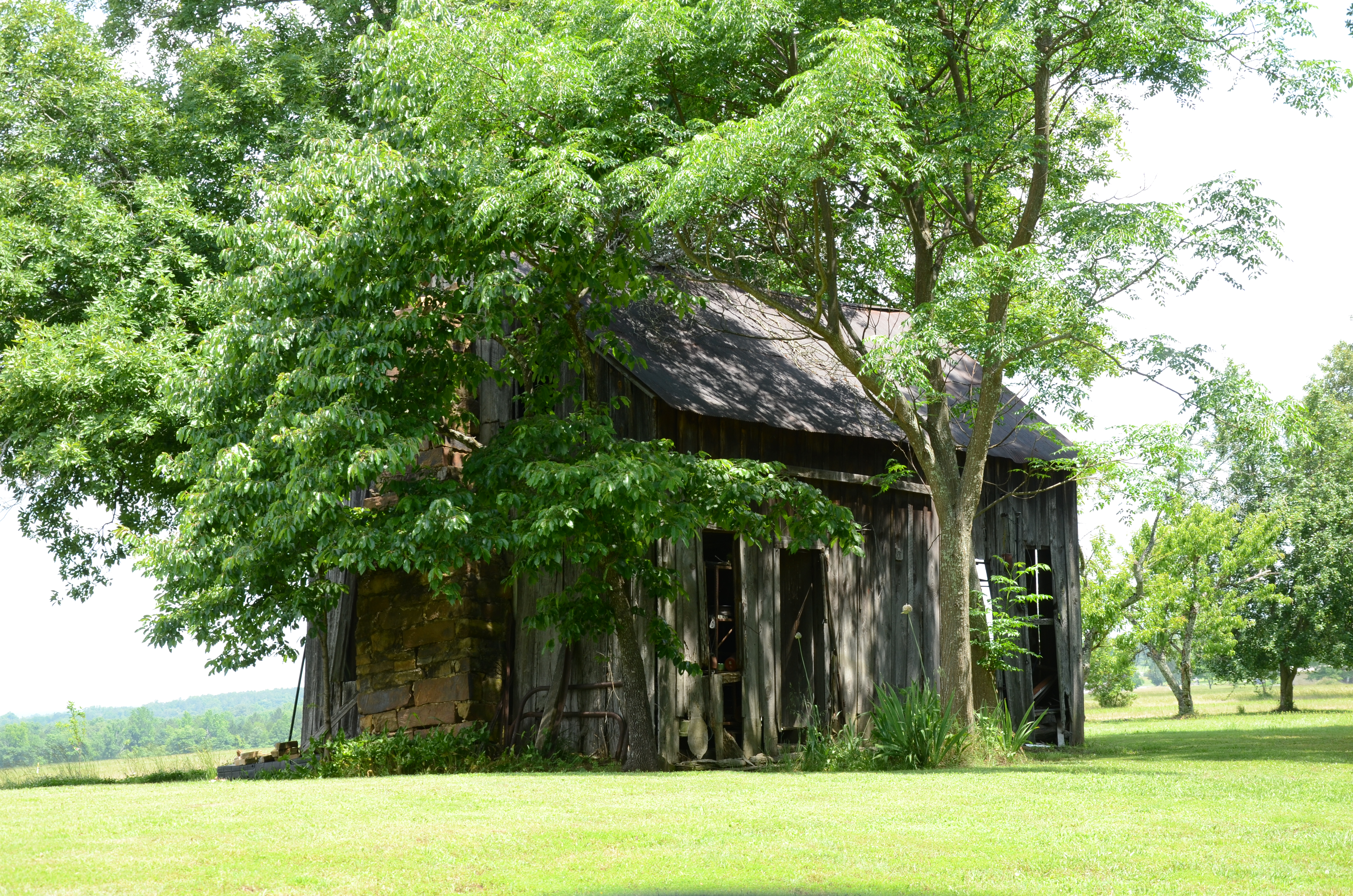

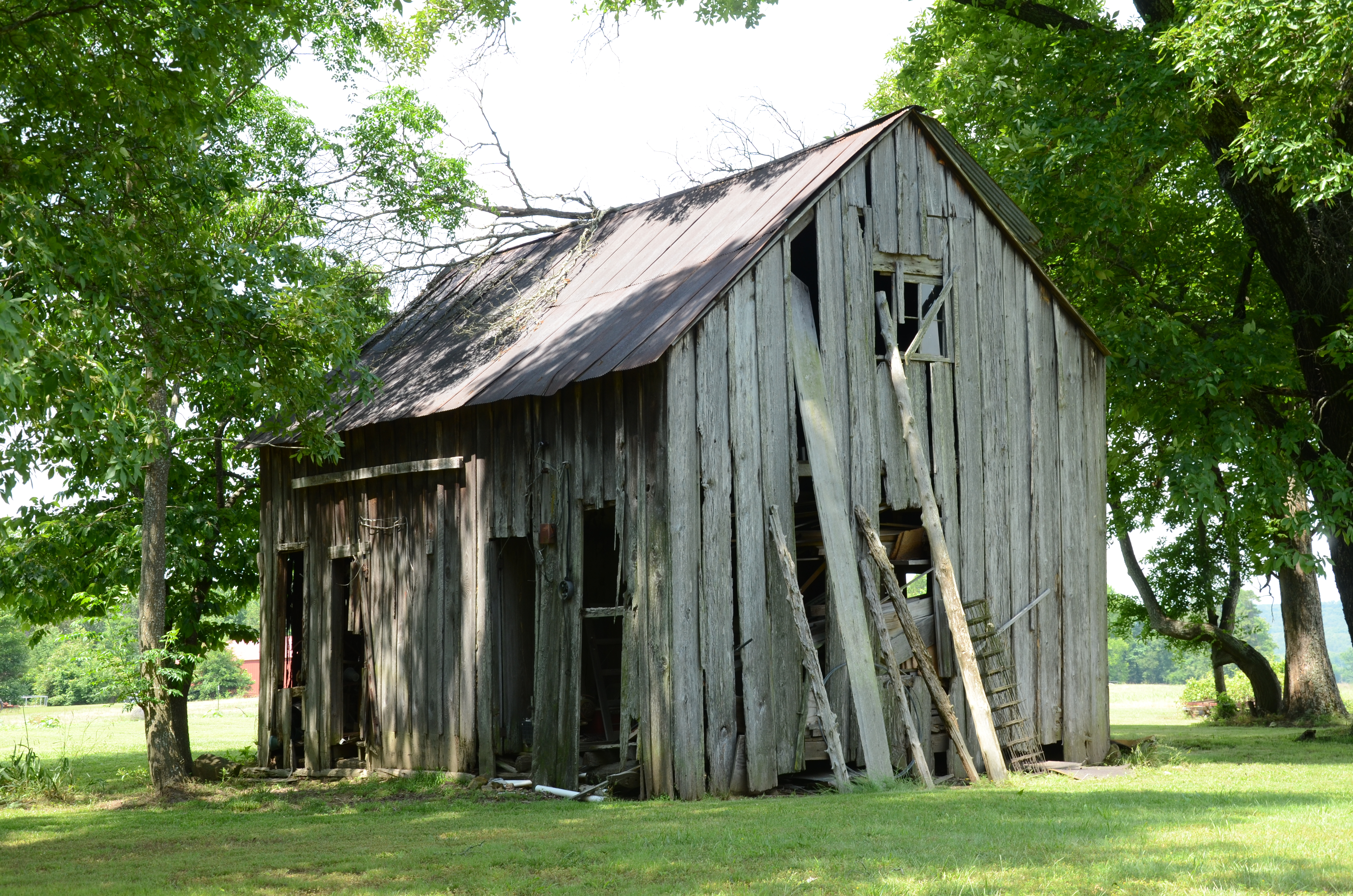

== See also ==
- National Register of Historic Places listings in White County, Arkansas
