= Letona Hotel =

- U.S. National Register of Historic Places
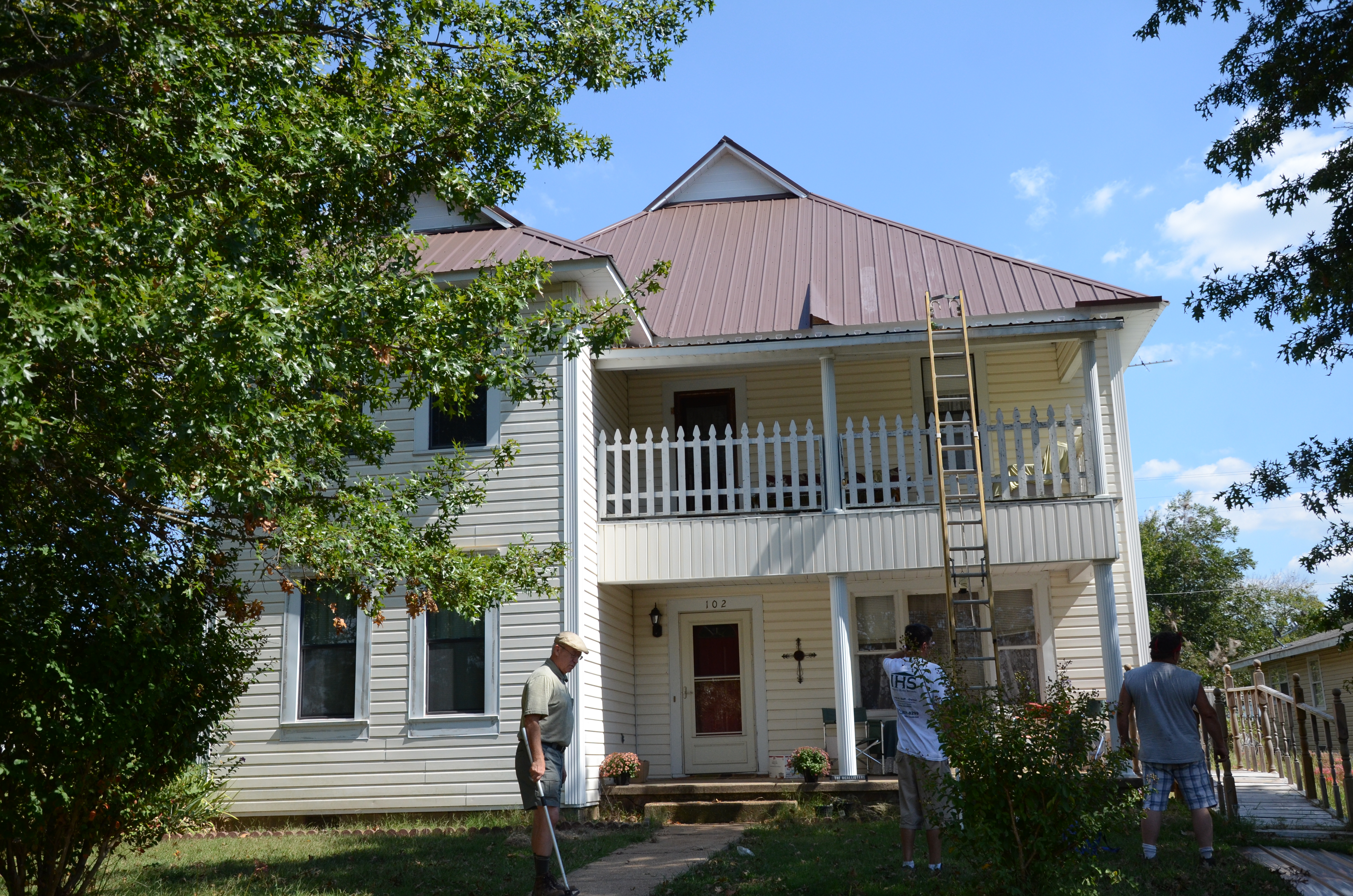

- Location within Arkansas Location within the United States
- Location: Off AR 310, Letona, Arkansas
- Coordinates: 35°21′44″N 91°49′45″W
- Area: less than one acre
- Built: 1910
- Architectural style: Frame irregular plan
- MPS: White County MPS
- NRHP reference No.: 91001329
- Added to NRHP: September 13, 1991

The Letona Hotel is a historic former hotel building (now a private residential duplex), between North Hotel and North Spain Streets, just north of Arkansas Highway 310 in Letona, Arkansas. It is a 2 1/2-story wood-frame structure, with a hip roof and novelty siding. A two-level porch extends across its eastern facade, supported by square posts. Built about 1910, it is a surviving reminder of the time when Letona was a major lumber shipment point on the Missouri and North Arkansas Railroad.

The building was listed on the National Register of Historic Places in 1991.

== See also ==
- National Register of Historic Places listings in White County, Arkansas
