= Arkansas Highway 377 =

State highway in Arkansas, United States

Highway 377

Route information
- Maintained by ArDOT
- Length: 11.15 mi (17.94 km)

Major junctions
- South end: AR 16 near Witts Spring
- North end: AR 74 at Snowball

Location
- Country: United States
- State: Arkansas
- Counties: Searcy

Highway system
- Arkansas Highway System; Interstate; US; State; Business; Spurs; Suffixed; Scenic; Heritage
← AR 376	→ AR 378

Arkansas Highway 377 (AR 377, Hwy. 377) is a north–south state highway in Searcy County, Arkansas. The route of 11.15 miles (17.94 km) runs from Highway 16 near Witts Spring north to Highway 74 at Snowball.

== Route description ==
The route begins at AR 16 near Witts Spring and runs north through Magic Springs to AR 74 near Snowball and the Gates-Helm Farm, which is listed on the National Register of Historic Places. The route does not cross or concur with any other state highways.

== Major intersections ==
The entire route is in Searcy County.

Location	mi	km	Destinations	Notes
	0.00	0.00	AR 16	Southern terminus
Snowball	11.15	17.94	AR 74	Northern terminus
1.000 mi = 1.609 km; 1.000 km = 0.621 mi
