= Gates-Helm Farm =

Historic house in Arkansas, United States

- U.S. National Register of Historic Places
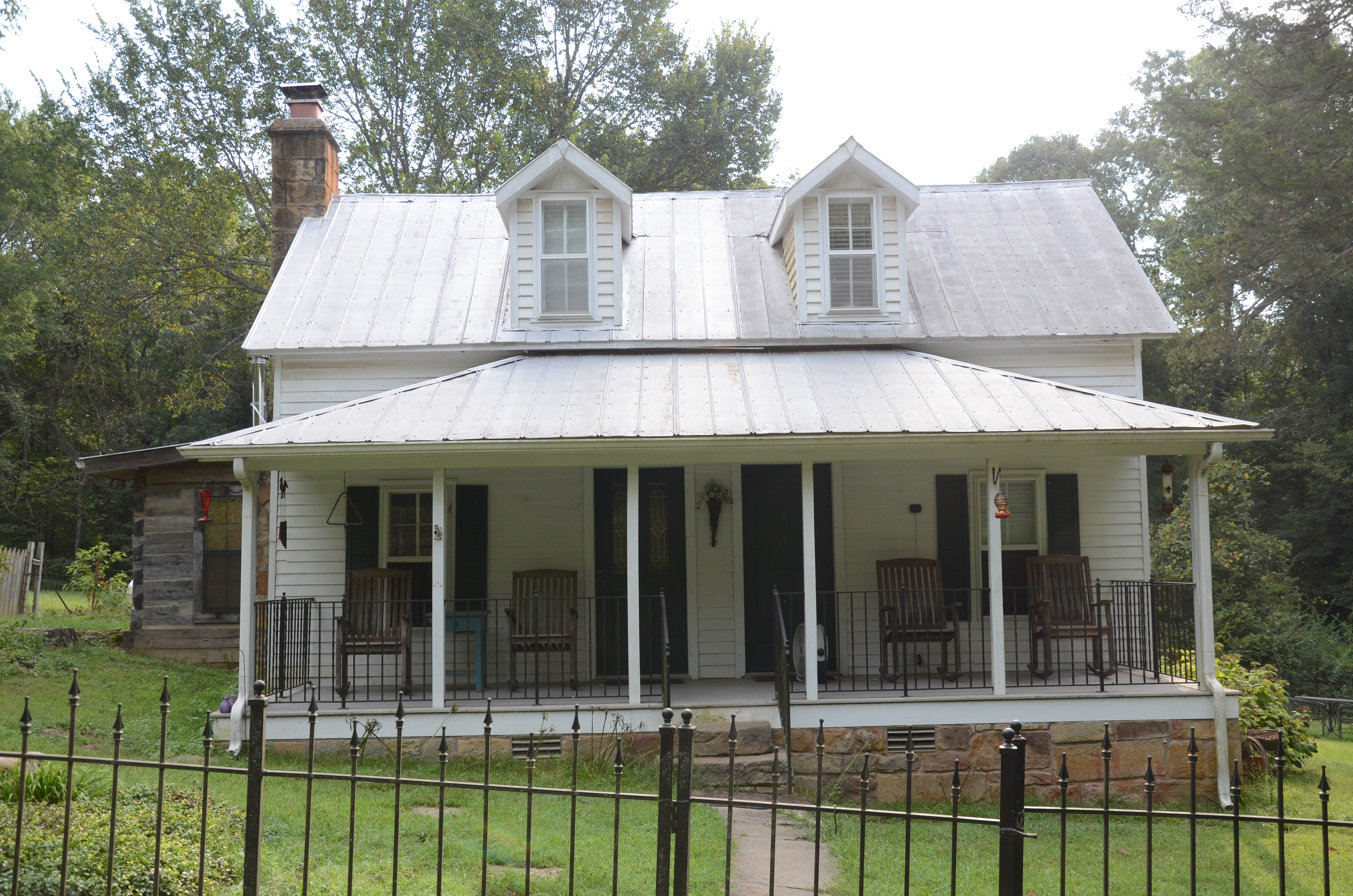

- Location within Arkansas Location within the United States
- Nearest city: Snowball, Arkansas
- Coordinates: 35°55′16″N 92°50′4″W
- Area: 2 acres (0.81 ha)
- Built by: William Henry Helm
- Architectural style: Plain Traditional
- MPS: Searcy County MPS
- NRHP reference No.: 93000817
- Added to NRHP: August 18, 1993

The Gates-Helm Farm is a historic early homestead property in rural Searcy County, Arkansas. It is located on both sides of County Road 13, north of Snowball. The property includes a single-pen log house, and a single-pen log barn, both built c. 1870, and a wood frame double-pen house built around 1900. The log structures, located down a lane on the west side of the road, were built by Peter Gates not long after purchasing the land. The house, on the east side of the road, was built by William Helm, who had married one of Gates' daughters. The property exemplifies the evolution of vernacular architecture of the period.

The property was listed on the National Register of Historic Places in 1993.

== See also ==
- National Register of Historic Places listings in Searcy County, Arkansas
