= Pettigrew School =

- U.S. National Register of Historic Places
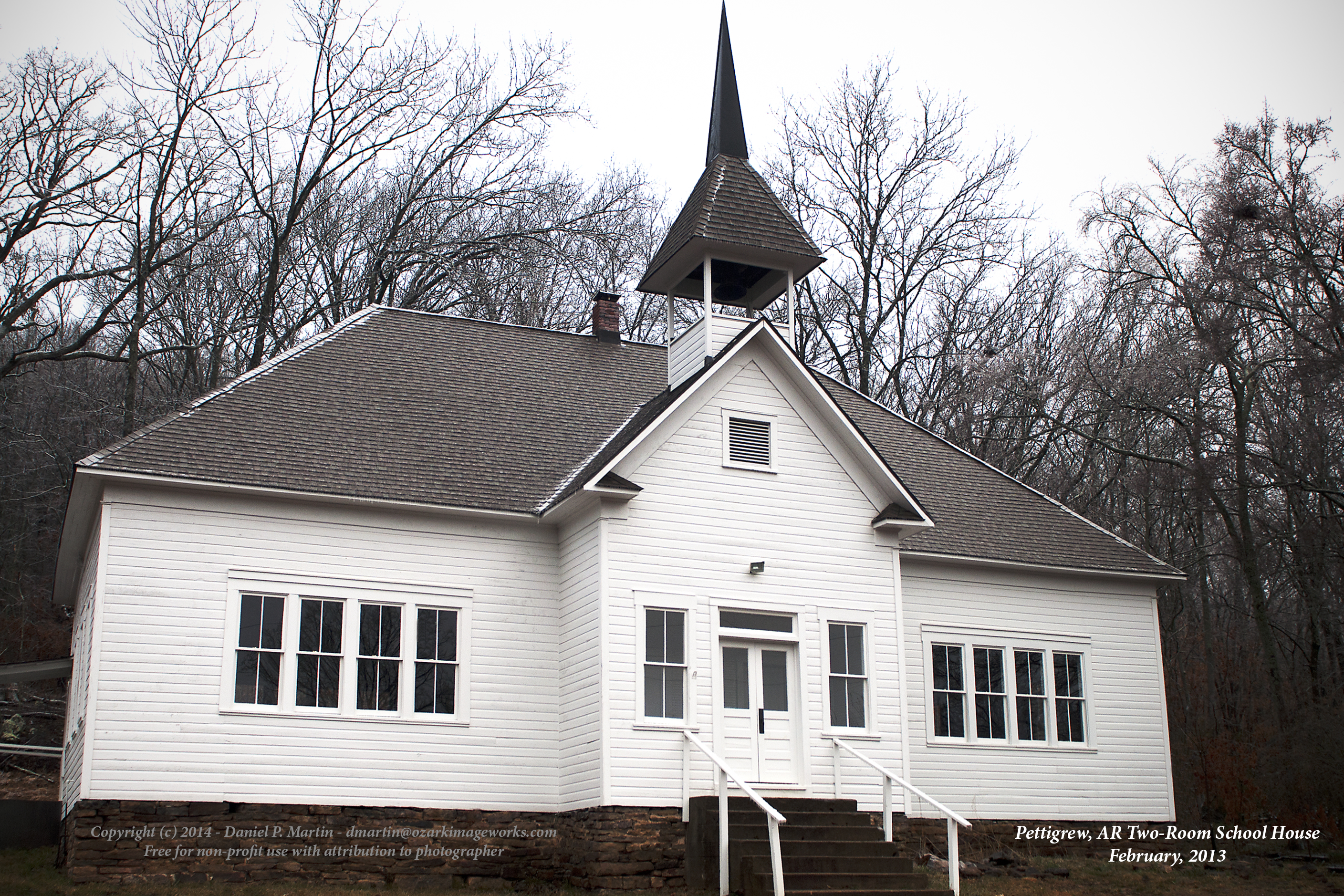

- Location within Arkansas Location within the United States
- Location: N of AR 16, Pettigrew, Arkansas
- Coordinates: 35°49′4″N 93°38′59″W
- Area: 2 acres (0.81 ha)
- NRHP reference No.: 95000272
- Added to NRHP: March 23, 1995

The former Pettigrew School, now the Pettigrew Community Building is a historic school building in the small community of Pettigrew, Arkansas. It is located off County Road 3205, just across the White River from Arkansas Highway 16. It is a single-story wood-frame structure, with a metal hip roof and weatherboard siding. An entry section projects from the center of front facade, topped by a gable roof and small belfry. The building is thought to have been built between 1908 and 1915, and was used as a school until 1963, when the area was consolidated into a larger school district. It has served as a community hall since then.

The building was listed on the National Register of Historic Places in 1995.

== See also ==
- National Register of Historic Places listings in Madison County, Arkansas
