= Albert Whisinant House =

Historic house in Arkansas, United States

- U.S. National Register of Historic Places
- Location within Arkansas Location within the United States
- Nearest city: Mountain Home, Arkansas
- Coordinates: 35°24′2″N 91°49′8″W
- Area: less than one acre
- Built: 1920
- Architectural style: Vernacular triple-entry
- MPS: White County MPS
- NRHP reference No.: 91001297
- Added to NRHP: July 23, 1992

The Albert Whisinant House is a historic house off Arkansas Highway 16 in rural northern White County, Arkansas. It is located southeast of Pangburn, on a drive that originally extended from Green Valley Lane in the north to AR 16 in the south, but is now only accessed from the north. It is a single story vernacular wood-frame structure, with a gabled roof, novelty siding, and a foundation of stone piers. In a survey of the county's historic buildings, it was the only one of its period (built c. 1920) that had separate entrances into three separate rooms.

The house was listed on the National Register of Historic Places in 1992.

== See also ==
- National Register of Historic Places listings in White County, Arkansas
