= Stokenbury Cemetery =

Historic cemetery in Arkansas, United States

- U.S. National Register of Historic Places
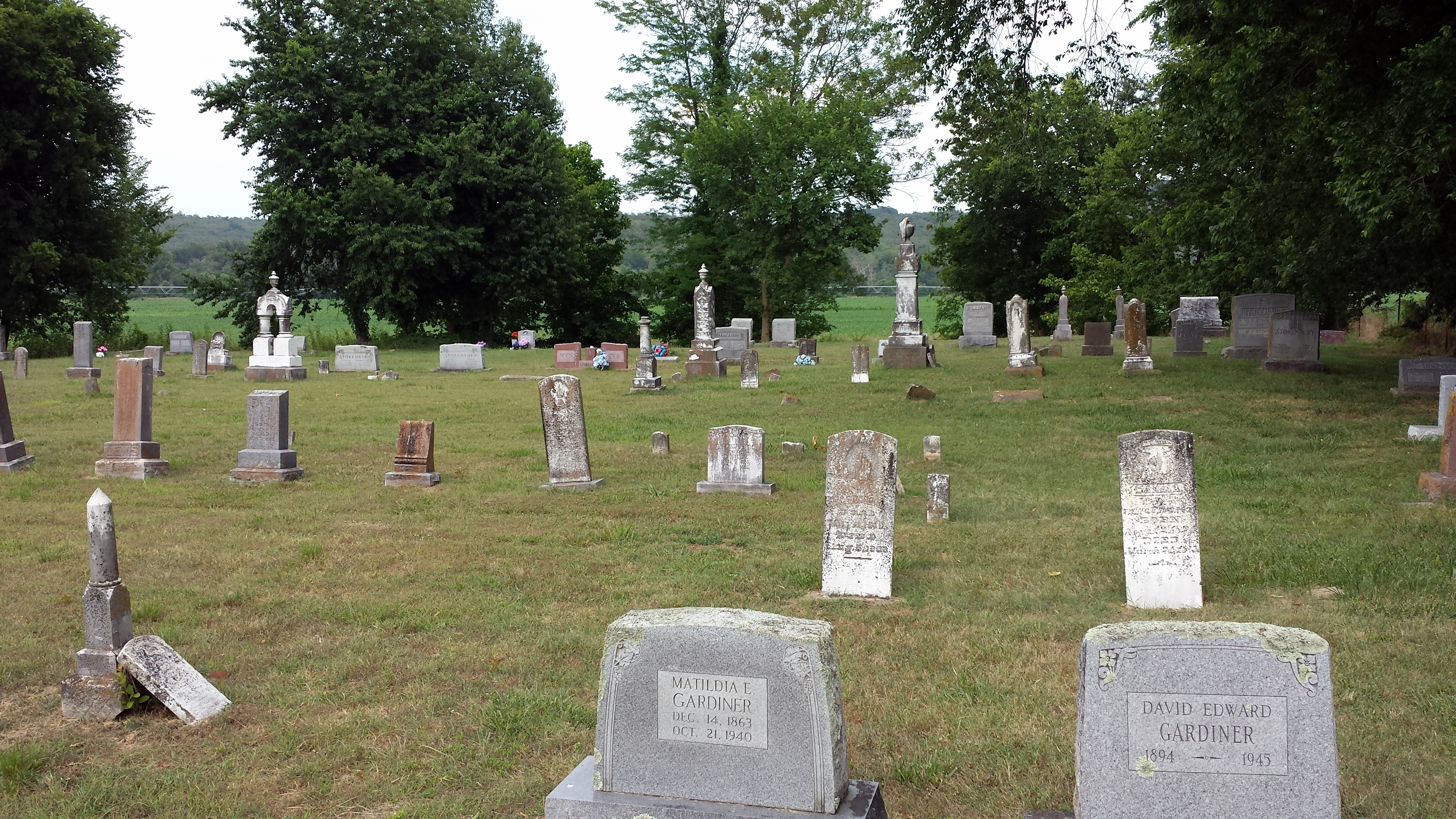

- Location within Arkansas Location within the United States
- Location: AR 16, Elkins, Arkansas
- Coordinates: 36°0′59″N 94°0′30″W
- Area: 1.2 acres (0.49 ha)
- Built: 1850
- Architectural style: Late 19th And Early 20th Century American Movements, Late Victorian
- NRHP reference No.: 09000799
- Added to NRHP: February 4, 2010

Stokenbury Cemetery is a historic cemetery on Arkansas Highway 16 in Elkins, Arkansas. Established c.1846, it is the best-preserved property representing the early settlement of Elkins (now a bedroom suburb of Fayetteville). The cemetery is 1.2 acres (0.49 ha) in size, and contains 153 marked and identified graves, 49 graves denoted by unmarked stones, and at least 16 unmarked or illegible burials. It contains several examples of high-style Victorian funerary art.

The cemetery was listed on the National Register of Historic Places in 2010.

== See also ==
- National Register of Historic Places listings in Washington County, Arkansas
