= Ben Hur, Arkansas =

- Unincorporated community
- Location within Arkansas Location within the United States
- Coordinates: 35°43′49″N 92°58′23″W
- Country: United States
- State: Arkansas
- County: Newton
- Elevation: 1,732 ft (528 m)
- Time zone: UTC-6 (Central (CST))
  - Summer (DST): UTC-5 (CDT)
- GNIS feature ID: 70624

Ben Hur is an unincorporated community in Pope County, Arkansas, United States.

The Pedestal Rocks Scenic Area, part of the Ozark–St. Francis National Forest, is located 2.5 mi (4.0 km) west of Ben Hur along Arkansas Highway 16.
