= Boston, Arkansas =

Unincorporated community in Arkansas, US

- Unincorporated community
- Interactive map of Boston, Arkansas
- Coordinates: 35°50′26″N 93°36′05″W
- Country: United States
- State: Arkansas
- County: Madison
- Elevation: 2,330 ft (710 m)

Boston is an unincorporated community in the Boston Mountains of southeastern Madison County, Arkansas, United States. The community is located on Arkansas Highway 16 between Pettigrew to the southwest and Red Star to the northeast. The community is on a high ridge at an elevation of 2,329 feet (710 m). The location is at the headwaters of four streams: Kings River to the northeast, War Eagle Creek to the northwest, the White River to the east and southwest and Little Mulberry Creek (a tributary to the Mulberry River) to the southeast.

The Boston Chapel and cemetery lie about three-quarters of a mile to the south of Boston along a county road. The Boston Lookout Tower (35°48′05″N 93°35′59″W at elevation: 2,454 feet (748 m)) is about two miles south of Boston along the same county road.
