= Churchill-Hilger House =

Historic house in Arkansas, United States

- U.S. National Register of Historic Places
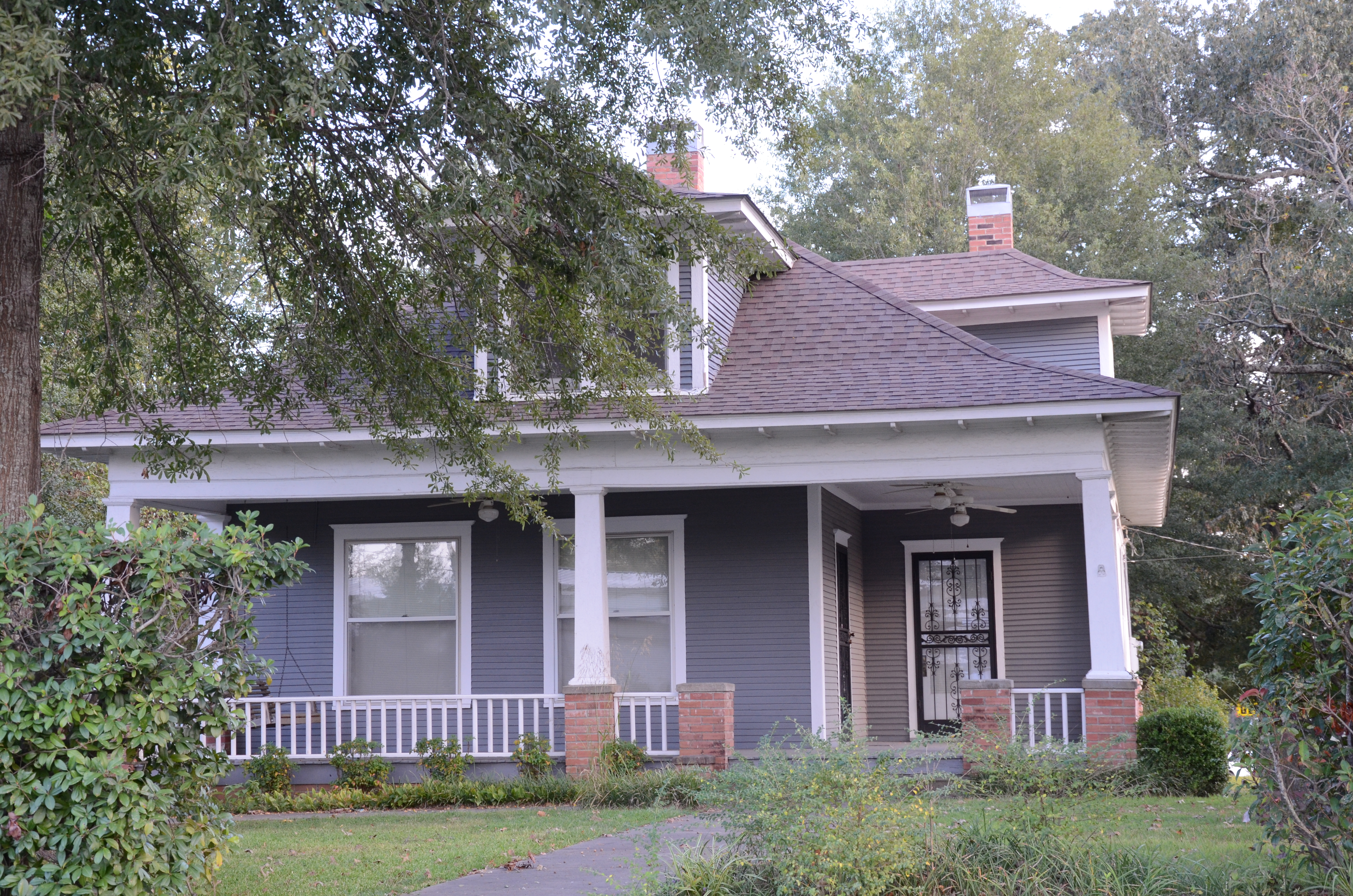

- Location within Arkansas Location within the United States
- Location: Jct. of Main and Searcy Sts., Pangburn, Arkansas
- Coordinates: 35°25′35″N 91°50′10″W
- Area: less than one acre
- Built: 1914
- Built by: Harry Churchill
- Architectural style: Bungalow/American craftsman
- MPS: White County MPS
- NRHP reference No.: 91001301
- Added to NRHP: September 5, 1991

The Churchill-Hilger House is a historic house at Main and Searcy Street in Pangburn, Arkansas. It is a single-story wood-frame structure, basically vernacular in appearance with some Craftsman detailing. It has a hip roof from which hip-roof dormers project, and a recessed L-shaped porch that wraps around the northern (front) and western facades. The house was built in 1914 for Harry Churchill, one of the leading businessmen responsible for Pangburn's economic success in the early 20th century. Churchill arrived in Pangburn in 1899, and built up a lucrative business manufacturing railroad ties, and successfully lobbied for the construction of the railroad through the town. At the time of the house's construction, it was considered somewhat lavish.

The house was listed on the National Register of Historic Places in 1991.

== See also ==
- National Register of Historic Places listings in White County, Arkansas
