= Dr. McAdams House =

Historic house in Arkansas, United States

- U.S. National Register of Historic Places
- Location within Arkansas Location within the United States
- Location: Jct. of Maple and Searcy Sts., Pangburn, Arkansas
- Coordinates: 35°25′29″N 91°50′8″W
- Area: less than one acre
- Built: 1910
- Architectural style: Vernacular irregular plan
- MPS: White County MPS
- NRHP reference No.: 91001300
- Added to NRHP: September 13, 1991

The Dr. McAdams House was a historic house at Main and Searcy Streets in Pangburn, Arkansas. It was a 1 1/2-story vernacular wood-frame structure, with a hip-over-gable roof, novelty siding, and a foundation of stone piers. A porch extended across the front, supported by posts, with a projecting gable above its left side. Built about 1910, it was one of the best-preserved houses of the period in White County.

The house was listed on the National Register of Historic Places in 1991. It has been listed as destroyed in the Arkansas Historic Preservation Program database.

== See also ==
- National Register of Historic Places listings in White County, Arkansas
