= Rufus Gray House =

Historic house in Arkansas, United States

- U.S. National Register of Historic Places
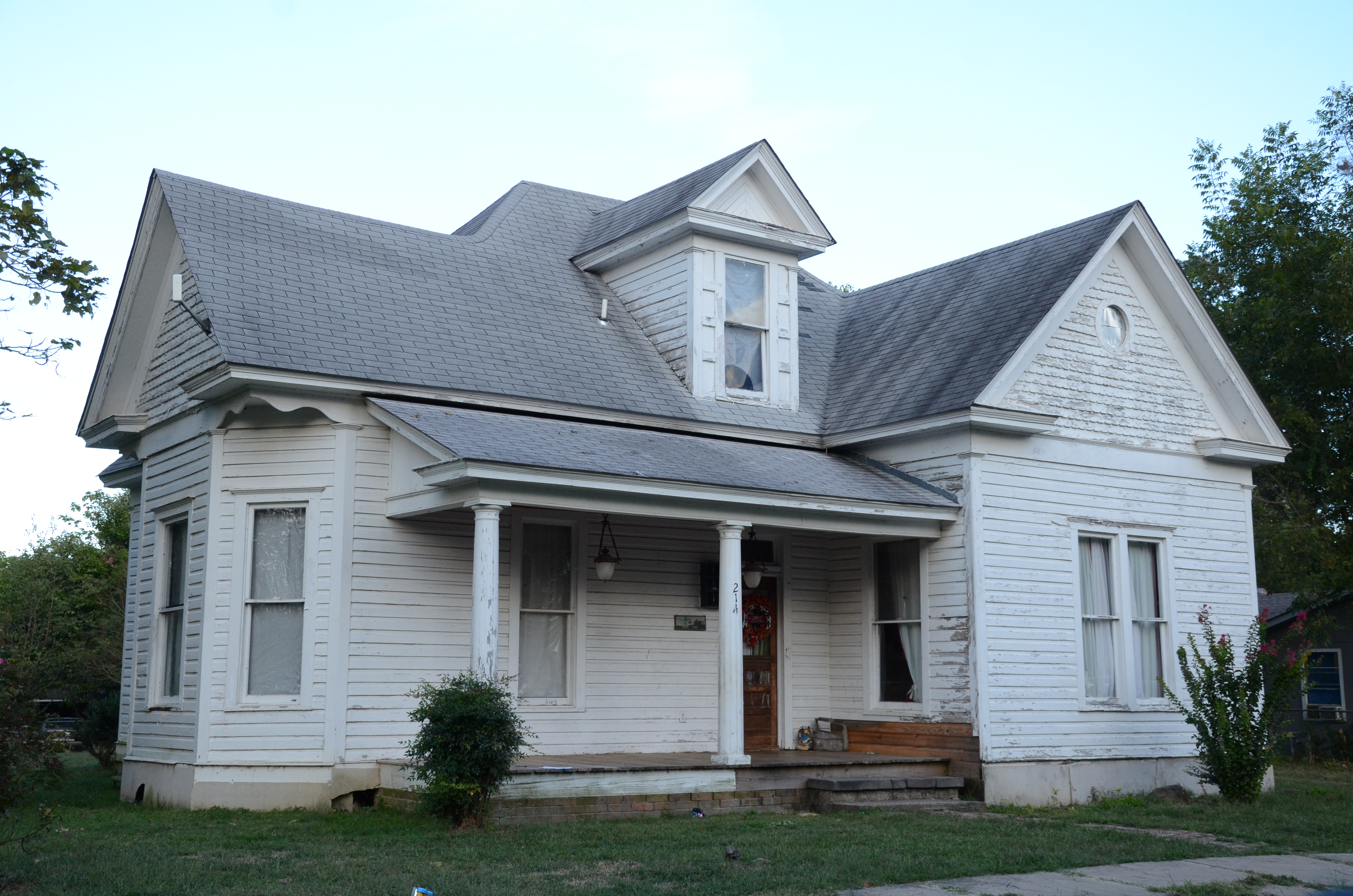

- Location within Arkansas Location within the United States
- Location: Jct. of Austin and South Sts., Pangburn, Arkansas
- Coordinates: 35°25′27″N 91°50′10″W
- Area: less than one acre
- Architect: Gray, Rufus
- Architectural style: Vernacular irregular plan
- MPS: White County MPS
- NRHP reference No.: 91001294
- Added to NRHP: September 5, 1991

The Rufus Gray House is a historic house at the southeast corner of Austin and South Streets in Pangburn, Arkansas, USA. It is a single-story wood-frame structure, with a hip-roofed central section that extends to projecting gables to the front and side. The front to the left of the gable section is sheltered by a shed-roof porch supported by Doric columns. The house was built about 1912 and is one of the few surviving houses in the community from this period.

The house was listed on the National Register of Historic Places in 1991.

== See also ==
- National Register of Historic Places listings in White County, Arkansas
