= Rialto Theater (Searcy, Arkansas) =

- U.S. National Register of Historic Places
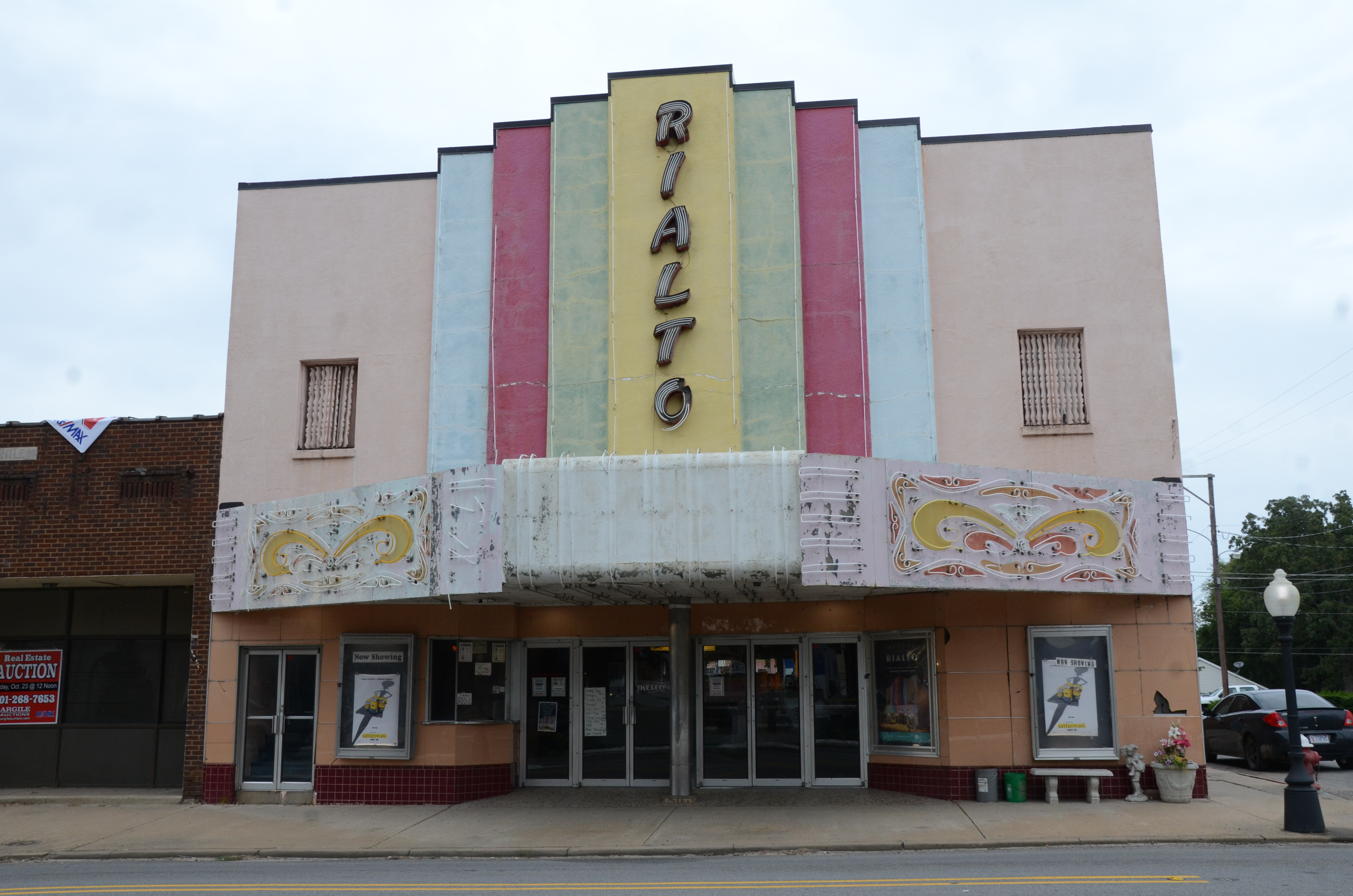

- Location within Arkansas Location within the United States
- Location: Jct. of Race and Spring Sts., Searcy, Arkansas
- Coordinates: 35°15′3″N 91°44′16″W
- Area: less than one acre
- Built: 1940
- Architect: Lightle, W.H.
- Architectural style: Art Deco
- MPS: White County MPS
- NRHP reference No.: 91001231
- Added to NRHP: September 13, 1991

The Rialto Theater is a historic movie theater at Race and Spring Streets in central Searcy, Arkansas. Built in the 1920s and renovated in 1940, it is one of the few buildings in all of White County to exhibit Art Deco styling (a result of the 1940 alterations), and the only theater with that styling. Its neon marquee is also the most elaborate known in the county.

The theater was listed on the National Register of Historic Places in 1991.

== See also ==
- National Register of Historic Places listings in White County, Arkansas
