= James William Boggs House =

Historic house in Arkansas, United States

- U.S. National Register of Historic Places
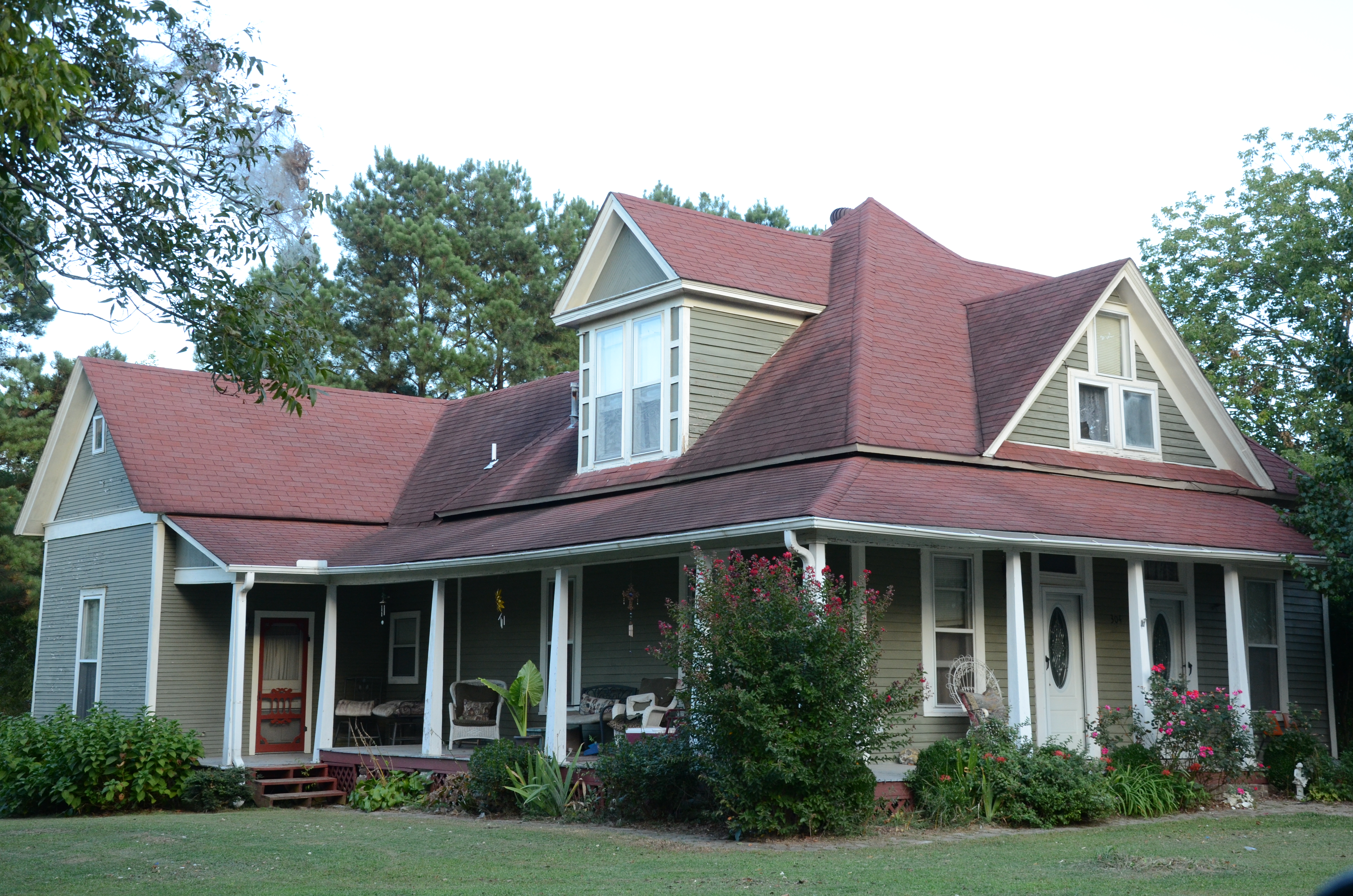

- Location within Arkansas Location within the United States
- Location: Austin St. between South and Torrence Sts., Pangburn, Arkansas
- Coordinates: 35°25′29″N 91°50′11″W
- Area: less than one acre
- Built: 1908
- Built by: Jim Stoltz
- Architectural style: Vernacular double-pile
- MPS: White County MPS
- NRHP reference No.: 91001298
- Added to NRHP: September 5, 1991

The James William Boggs House is a historic house on Austin Street in Pangburn, Arkansas. Located on the east side, between Torrence and South McKee Streets, it is a 1 1/2-story rambling wood-frame structure with a variety of gables, porches and projecting sections. Its front facade is dominated by a single-story hip-roofed porch supported by tapered square columns, and shelters a pair of entrances. To the rear of the main block a shotgun house was moved and attached. It was built in 1908 and is one of a small number of houses surviving from the period in White County.

The house was listed on the National Register of Historic Places in 1991.
