= Austin Pangburn House =

Historic house in Arkansas, United States

- U.S. National Register of Historic Places
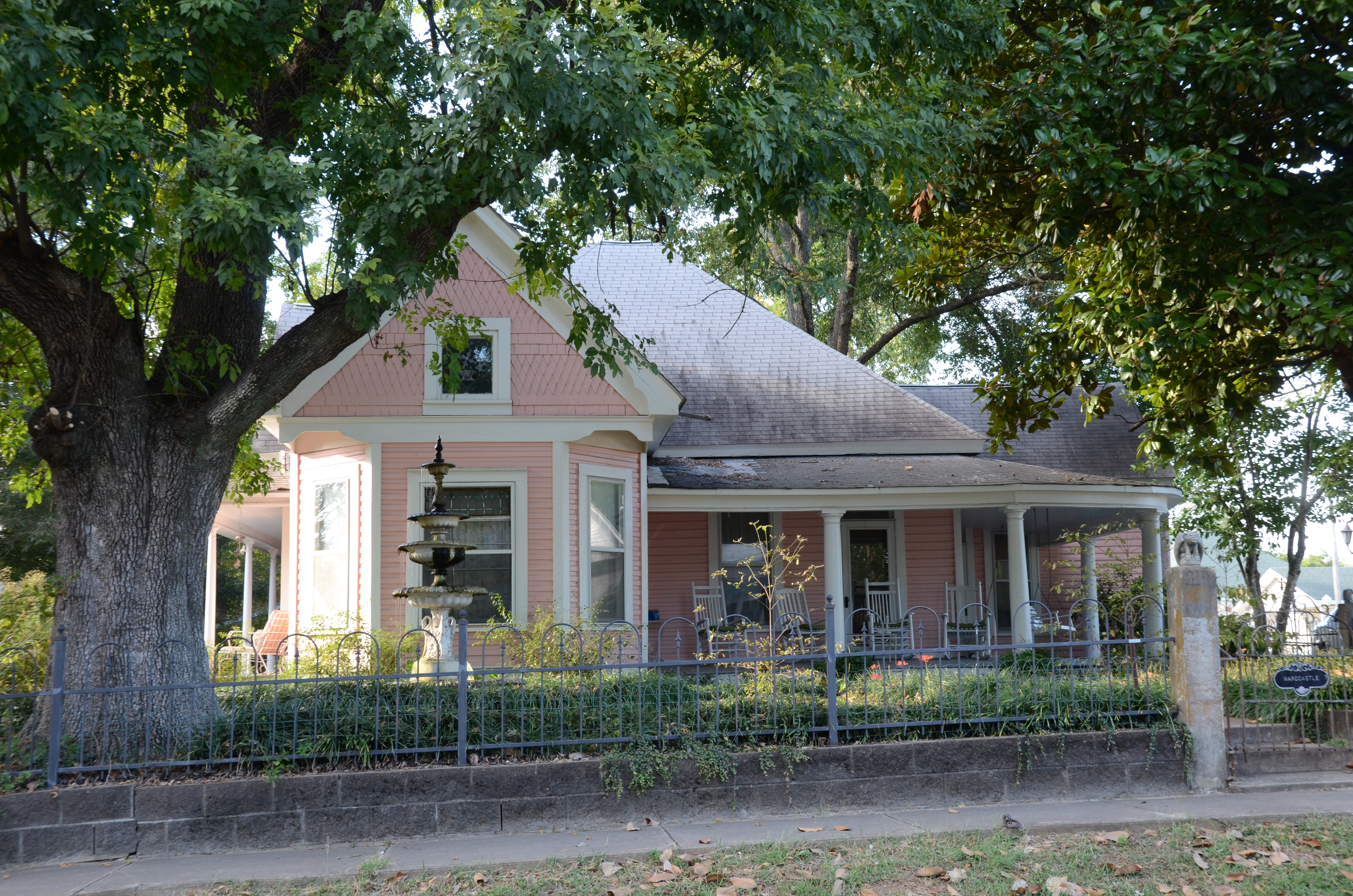

- Location within Arkansas Location within the United States
- Location: Jct. of Main and Austin Sts., Pangburn, Arkansas
- Coordinates: 35°25′34″N 91°50′16″W
- Area: less than one acre
- Built: 1908
- Architectural style: Vernacular irregular plan
- MPS: White County MPS
- NRHP reference No.: 91001290
- Added to NRHP: September 5, 1991

The Austin Pangburn House is a historic house at Main and Austin Streets in Pangburn, Arkansas. It is a 1 1/2-story wood-frame structure, with irregular massing typical of the Queen Anne period. It has a hip roof, with projecting gables that are finished in bands of decoratively cut wooden shingles, with novelty siding on the rest of the house. A porch wraps around two sides, supported by Doric columns. Built c. 1908, it is a well-preserved example of period construction in White County.

The house was listed on the National Register of Historic Places in 1991.

== See also ==
- National Register of Historic Places listings in White County, Arkansas
