= John Shutter House =

Historic house in Arkansas, United States

- U.S. National Register of Historic Places
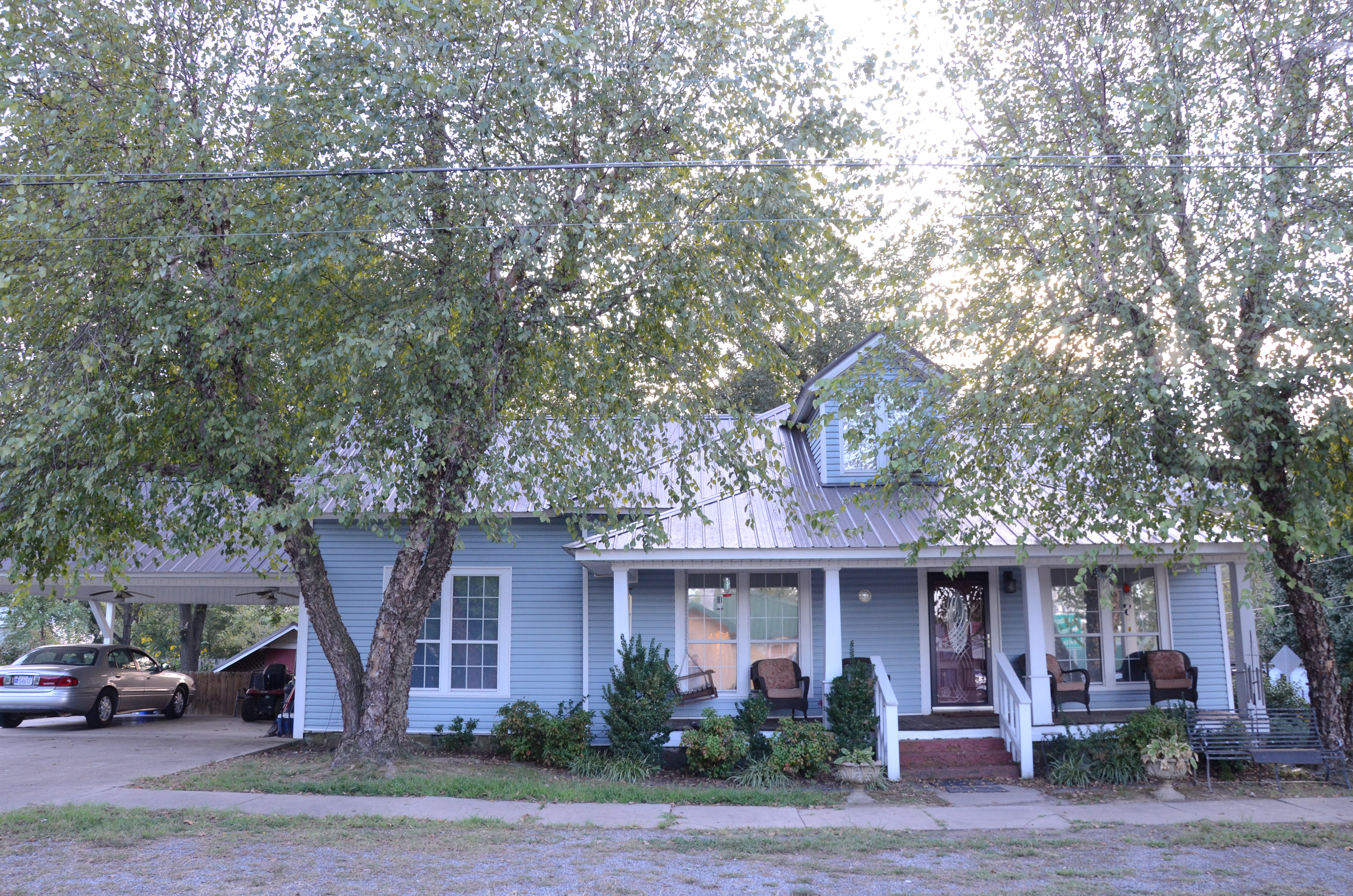

- Location within Arkansas Location within the United States
- Location: Jct. of Austin and Main Sts., Pangburn, Arkansas
- Coordinates: 35°25′32″N 91°50′15″W
- Area: less than one acre
- Built: 1908
- Architectural style: Vernacular double-pile
- MPS: White County MPS
- NRHP reference No.: 91001299
- Added to NRHP: September 5, 1991

The John Shutter House is a historic house at Austin and Main Streets in Pangburn, Arkansas. It is a 1 1/2-story wood-frame house, with a side-gable roof and a stone foundation. A hip-roofed porch extends across part of the front, supported by wooden columns mounted on stuccoed piers. A shed-roofed carport extends to the left side of the house. The house was built in 1908, and is one of a modest number of houses in White County surviving from that period.

The house was listed on the National Register of Historic Places in 1991.

== See also ==
- National Register of Historic Places listings in White County, Arkansas
