= John Pettigrew =

John Pettigrew may refer to:

- John Pettigrew (footballer) (1934–2014), Australian soccer player
- John Pettigrew (businessman) (born 1968), British businessman
- John Pettigrew (politician) (1832–1878), politician in Queensland, Australia
- Jack Pettigrew (John Douglas Pettigrew, born 1943), professor of physiology
