= Wood Freeman House No. 1 =

Historic house in Arkansas, United States

- U.S. National Register of Historic Places
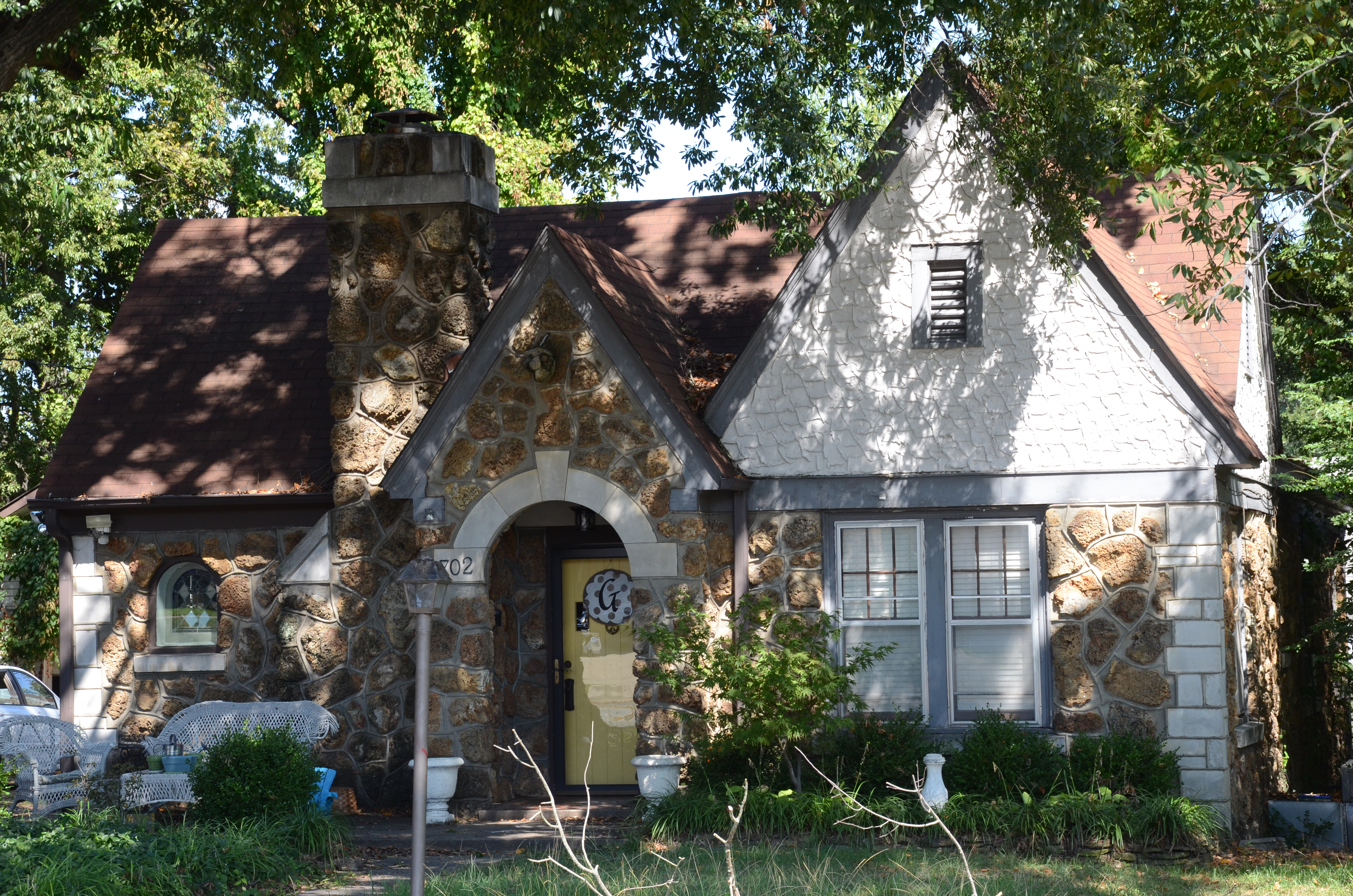

- Location within Arkansas Location within the United States
- Location: 702 Arch St., Searcy, Arkansas
- Coordinates: 35°15′1″N 91°44′40″W
- Area: less than one acre
- Built: 1934
- Architect: Wood Freeman
- Architectural style: Late 19th And 20th Century Revivals, English Revival
- MPS: White County MPS
- NRHP reference No.: 91001185
- Added to NRHP: September 5, 1991

The Wood Freeman House No. 1 is a historic house at 702 Arch Street in Searcy, Arkansas. It is a 1 1/2-story T-shaped structure, with a wood frame and rusticated stone exterior. Its main axis is horizontal to the street, with the cross section at the right. The main entrance is at the crook of the T, set under a projecting gable section with round-arch opening. Built about 1934, it is a fine local example of English Revival architecture. Wood Freeman House No. 2 is the other architecturally significant houses built by local builder Wood Freeman.

The house was listed on the National Register of Historic Places in 1991.

== See also ==
- National Register of Historic Places listings in White County, Arkansas
