= Jesse N. Cypert Law Office =

- U.S. National Register of Historic Places
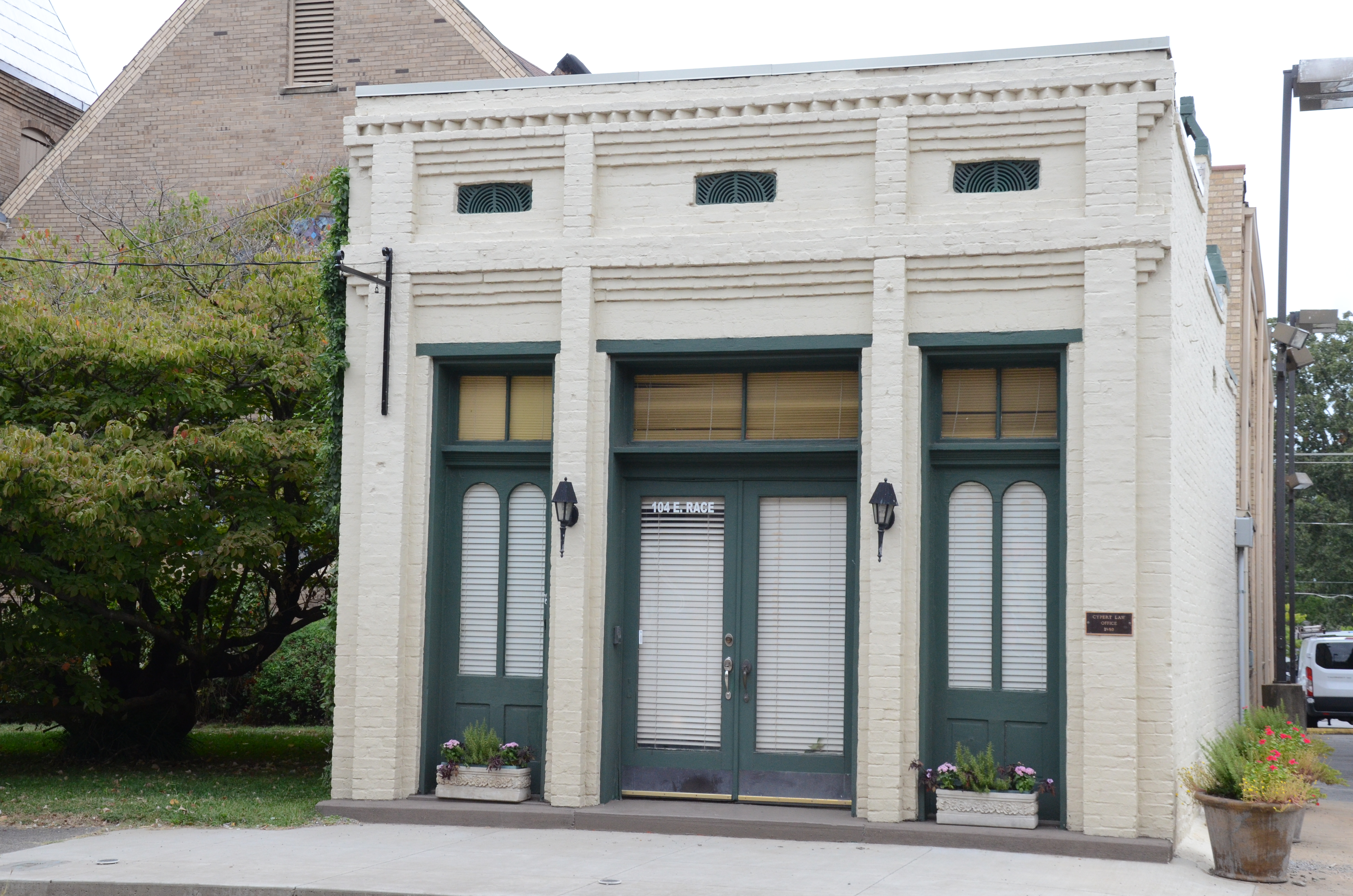

- Location within Arkansas Location within the United States
- Location: 104 E. Race St., Searcy, Arkansas
- Coordinates: 35°15′4″N 91°44′13″W
- Area: less than one acre
- Built: 1880
- Architectural style: Vernacular commercial
- MPS: White County MPS
- NRHP reference No.: 91001179
- Added to NRHP: July 12, 1992

The Jesse N. Cypert Law Office is a historic commercial building at 104 East Race Street in Searcy, Arkansas. It is a vernacular single-story brick structure, sharing party walls with its neighbors. The front facade is divided into bays by corbelled brickwork, with a double door in the central bay on the first floor, and windows in the flanking bays. Above these are separately-articulated bays housing vents, and there is a simple brick cornice at the top. Built c. 1880, this building is a well-preserved local example of the vernacular commercial architecture of the period.

The building was listed on the National Register of Historic Places in 1992.

== See also ==
- National Register of Historic Places listings in White County, Arkansas
