= Coward House =

Historic house in Arkansas, United States

- Formerly listed on the U.S. National Register of Historic Places
- Location within Arkansas Location within the United States
- Location: 1105 N. Maple St., Searcy, Arkansas
- Coordinates: 35°15′34″N 91°44′42″W
- Area: less than one acre
- Built: 1915
- Architectural style: Vernacular irregular plan
- MPS: White County MPS
- NRHP reference No.: 91001229

Significant dates
- Added to NRHP: July 10, 1992
- Removed from NRHP: January 26, 2018

The Coward House was a historic house at 1105 North Maple Street in Searcy, Arkansas. It was a single-story brick structure, with an irregular cross-gable roof configuration that was hipped at its center. Its east-facing front facade had a shed-roof porch that wrapped around to the south, supported by box columns mounted on brick piers. Built c. 1915, this vernacular house was one of a modest number from that period to survive in the city.

The house was listed on the National Register of Historic Places in 1992. It has been listed as destroyed in the Arkansas Historic Preservation Program database, and was delisted in 2018.

== See also ==
- National Register of Historic Places listings in White County, Arkansas
