= Cumberland Presbyterian Church (Searcy, Arkansas) =

Historic church in Arkansas, United States

- U.S. National Register of Historic Places
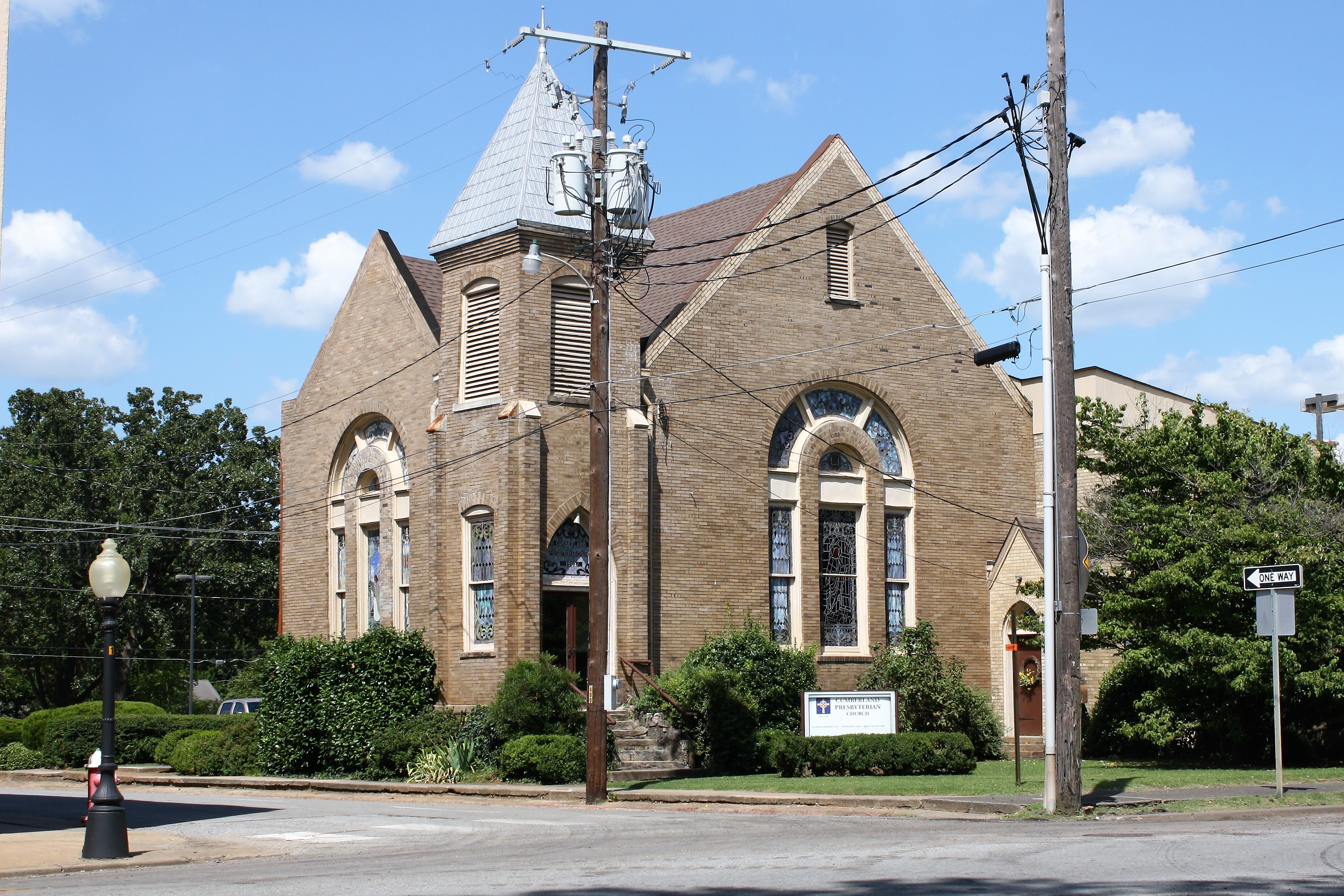

- Location within Arkansas Location within the United States
- Location: Jct. of Race and Spring Sts., Searcy, Arkansas
- Coordinates: 35°15′3″N 91°44′14″W
- Area: less than one acre
- Built: 1903
- Architectural style: Classical Revival, Romanesque
- MPS: White County MPS
- NRHP reference No.: 91001225
- Added to NRHP: July 10, 1992

The Cumberland Presbyterian Church is a historic church at the junction of Race and Spring Streets in Searcy, Arkansas. It is a single-story buff brick Romanesque Revival structure, with a cross-gable roof configuration and a square tower at the right front corner. The tower houses the main entrance in a pointed-arch recess, and has a louvered belfry at the second level below the pyramidal roof. The church was built in 1903 for a congregation organized in 1824, and is a fine example of Romanesque and Classical Revival architecture.

The building was listed on the National Register of Historic Places in 1992.

== See also ==
- National Register of Historic Places listings in White County, Arkansas
