= Walter Marsh House =

Historic house in Arkansas, United States

- U.S. National Register of Historic Places
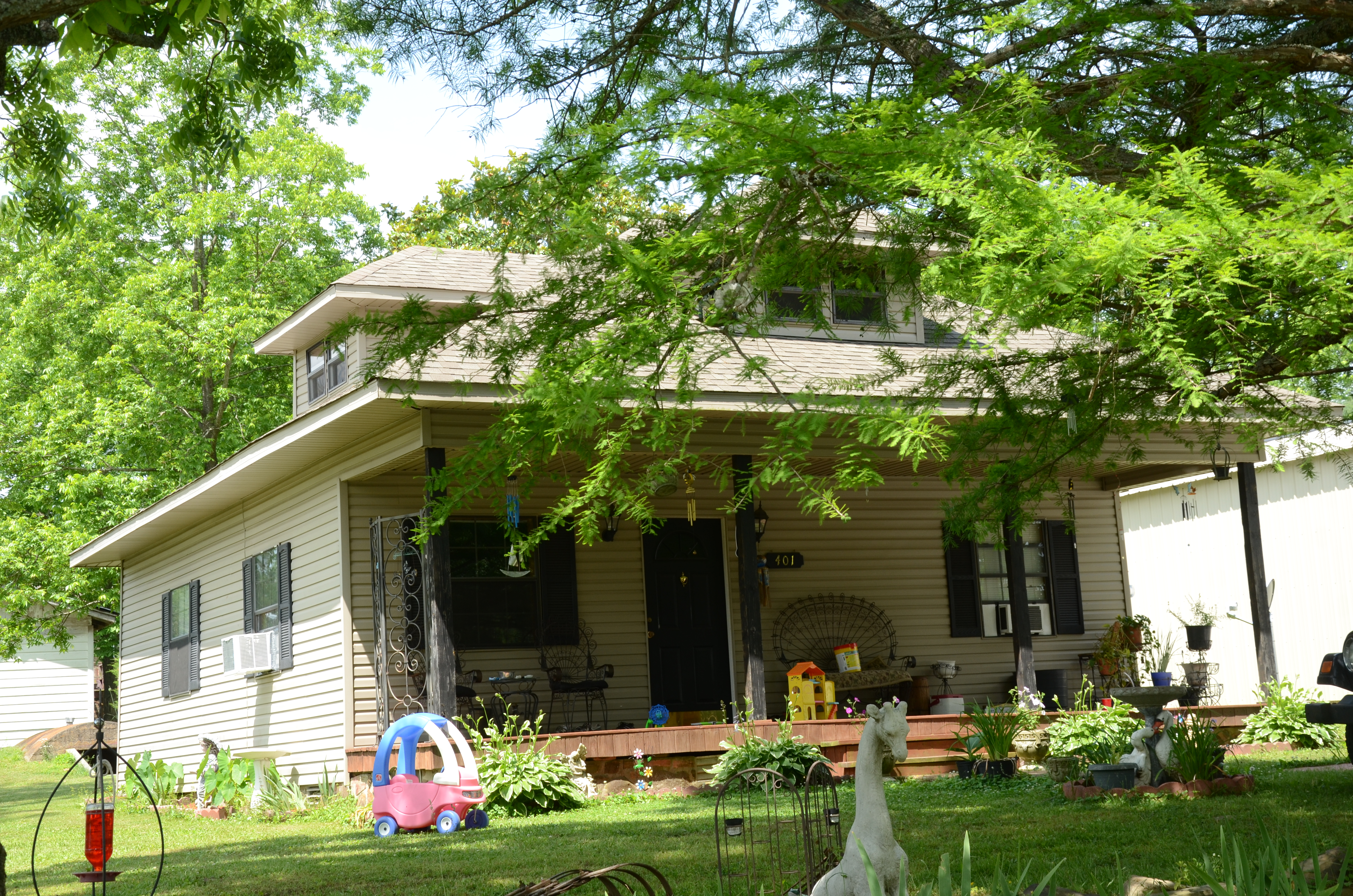

- Location within Arkansas Location within the United States
- Location: Jct. of Maple and Torrence Sts., Pangburn, Arkansas
- Coordinates: 35°25′24″N 91°50′30″W
- Area: less than one acre
- Built: 1920
- Architectural style: Vernacular double-pile
- MPS: White County MPS
- NRHP reference No.: 91001288
- Added to NRHP: September 5, 1991

The Walter Marsh House is a historic house at Maple and Torrence Streets in Pangburn, Arkansas. It is a 1 1/2-story wood-frame structure, with a hip roof, novelty siding, and a stone foundation. The roof extends over a front porch, which is supported by simple box columns on piers. A two-window hip-roof dormer projects above the porch. Built about 1920, it is a well-preserved vernacular double-pile residence of the period.

The house was listed on the National Register of Historic Places in 1991.

== See also ==
- National Register of Historic Places listings in White County, Arkansas
