= Wood Freeman House No. 2 =

Historic house in Arkansas, United States

- U.S. National Register of Historic Places
- Location within Arkansas Location within the United States
- Location: 703 W. Race St., Searcy, Arkansas
- Coordinates: 35°15′2″N 91°44′40″W
- Area: less than one acre
- Built: 1935
- Architect: Wood Freeman
- Architectural style: Late 19th And 20th Century Revivals, English Revival
- MPS: White County MPS
- NRHP reference No.: 91001181
- Added to NRHP: September 5, 1991

The Wood Freeman House No. 2 is a historic house at 703 West Race Street in Searcy, Arkansas. It is a 1 1/2-story structure, with a wood frame and exterior finish of brick, stucco, and coral. It is basically rectangular in shape, with a projecting gable section at the left end, and a center entrance sheltered by a broad gable-roofed porch. A fieldstone chimney rises just to the right of the entrance. Built about 1935, it is a good local example of English Revival architecture. Wood Freeman House No. 1 is the other architecturally significant houses built by local builder Wood Freeman.

The house was listed on the National Register of Historic Places in 1991. It was incorrectly listed as destroyed in the Arkansas Historic Preservation Program database.

== See also ==
- National Register of Historic Places listings in White County, Arkansas
