= Pettigrew, Arkansas =

- Unincorporated community
- Location within Arkansas Location within the United States
- Coordinates: 35°49′04″N 93°38′55″W
- Country: United States
- State: Arkansas
- County: Madison
- Elevation: 1,831 ft (558 m)
- Time zone: UTC-6 (Central (CST))
  - Summer (DST): UTC-5 (CDT)
- ZIP code: 72752
- Area code: 479
- GNIS feature ID: 73058

Pettigrew is an unincorporated community in Madison County, Arkansas, United States. Pettigrew is located on Arkansas Highway 16, 6.5 miles (10.5 km) east of St. Paul and three miles southwest of Boston. The community is in the Boston Mountains along the banks of the headwaters of the White River. Pettigrew has a post office with ZIP code 72752.
