= Clinton Municipal Airport (Arkansas) =

Airport in Arkansas, United States

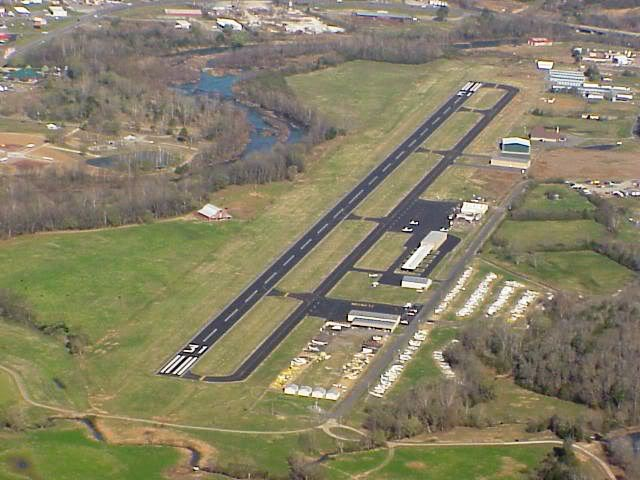
- IATA: none; ICAO: KCCA; FAA LID: CCA

Summary
- Airport type: Public
- Owner: City of Clinton
- Serves: Clinton, Arkansas
- Elevation AMSL: 514 ft (157 m)
- Coordinates: 35°35′52″N 092°27′06″W

Map
- Location of airport in Arkansas CCA (the United States)

Runways
Direction	Length		Surface
Direction	ft	m	Surface
13/31	4,012	1,223	Asphalt

Statistics (2009)
- Aircraft operations: 10,400
- Based aircraft: 25
- Source: Federal Aviation Administration

Clinton Municipal Airport (ICAO: KCCA, FAA LID: CCA, formerly 4M4) is a city-owned public-use airport located one nautical mile (2 km) northeast of the central business district of Clinton, a city in Van Buren County, Arkansas, United States.

This airport is included in the FAA's National Plan of Integrated Airport Systems for 2011–2015, which categorized it as a general aviation facility.

Although most U.S. airports use the same three-letter location identifier for the FAA and IATA, this facility is assigned CCA by the FAA but has no designation from the IATA.

== Facilities and aircraft ==
Clinton Municipal Airport covers an area of 52 acres (21 ha) at an elevation of 514 feet (157 m) above mean sea level. It has one runway designated 13/31 with an asphalt surface measuring 4,012 by 60 feet (1,223 x 18 m).

For the 12-month period ending May 31, 2009, the airport had 10,400 aircraft operations, an average of 28 per day: 96% general aviation and 4% military. At that time there were 25 aircraft based at this airport: 72% single-engine, 24% multi-engine and 4% helicopter.

== See also ==
- List of airports in Arkansas
