= Snowball, Arkansas =

- Unincorporated community
- Location within Arkansas Location within the United States
- Coordinates: 35°54′23″N 92°49′19″W
- Country: United States
- State: Arkansas
- County: Searcy
- Elevation: 764 ft (233 m)
- Time zone: UTC-6 (Central (CST))
  - Summer (DST): UTC-5 (CDT)
- Area code: 870
- GNIS feature ID: 78399

Snowball is an unincorporated community in Searcy County, Arkansas, United States. Snowball is located at the junction of Arkansas highways 74 and 377, 10.5 miles (16.9 km) west of Marshall.
