= Letona, Arkansas =

- Town
- Location of Letona in White County, Arkansas.
- Coordinates: 35°21′49″N 91°49′46″W
- Country: United States
- State: Arkansas
- County: White

Area
  - Total: 0.39 sq mi (1.01 km^{2})
  - Land: 0.39 sq mi (1.01 km^{2})
  - Water: 0 sq mi (0.00 km^{2})
- Elevation: 276 ft (84 m)

Population (2020)
  - Total: 240
  - Estimate (2025): 241 ▲
  - Density: 617.6/sq mi (238.45/km^{2})
- Time zone: UTC-6 (Central (CST))
  - Summer (DST): UTC-5 (CDT)
- ZIP code: 72085
- Area code: 501
- FIPS code: 05-39520
- GNIS feature ID: 2406008

Letona is a town in White County, Arkansas, United States. Sherrel Bennett is the current mayor. As of the 2020 census, Letona had a population of 240.

== Geography ==
According to the United States Census Bureau, the town has a total area of 1.0 km^{2} (0.39 sq mi), all land.

== Demographics ==
Historical population
Census	Pop.	Note	%±
1920	252		—
1930	185		−26.6%
1940	186		0.5%
1950	164		−11.8%
1960	141		−14.0%
1970	191		35.5%
1980	231		20.9%
1990	218		−5.6%
2000	201		−7.8%
2010	255		26.9%
2020	240		−5.9%
2025 (est.)	241	▲	0.4%
U.S. Decennial Census

As of the census of 2000, there were 201 people, 80 households, and 56 families residing in the town. The population density was 199.0 people/km^{2} (515 people/mi^{2}). There were 91 housing units at an average density of 90.1 units/km^{2} (233 units/mi^{2}). The racial makeup of the town was 96.02% White, 1.00% Native American, and 2.99% from two or more races. 0.50% of the population were Hispanic or Latino of any race.

There were 80 households, out of which 30.0% had children under the age of 18 living with them, 61.3% were married couples living together, 6.3% had a female householder with no husband present, and 30.0% were non-families. 23.8% of all households were made up of individuals, and 16.3% had someone living alone who was 65 years of age or older. The average household size was 2.51 and the average family size was 3.07.

In the town, the population was spread out, with 21.4% under the age of 18, 10.0% from 18 to 24, 23.4% from 25 to 44, 23.9% from 45 to 64, and 21.4% who were 65 years of age or older. The median age was 43 years. For every 100 females, there were 84.4 males. For every 100 females age 18 and over, there were 90.4 males.

The median income for a household in the town was $21,875, and the median income for a family was $27,500. Males had a median income of $22,292 versus $15,208 for females. The per capita income for the town was $12,303. About 11.1% of families and 17.2% of the population were below the poverty line, including 33.3% of those under the age of eighteen and 8.9% of those 65 or over.
