= Arkansas Highway 385 =

State highway in Arkansas, United States

Highway 385

Route information
- Maintained by AHTD
- Existed: 1966–present

Section 1
- Length: 8.98 mi (14.45 km)
- South end: AR 11 in Griffithville
- North end: AR 36 in Kensett

Section 2
- Length: 6.23 mi (10.03 km)
- North end: AR 367 in Judsonia
- Major intersections: I-57 / US 64 / US 67 / US 167 near Judsonia
- South end: AR 157 at Plainview

Location
- Country: United States
- State: Arkansas
- Counties: White

Highway system
- Arkansas Highway System; Interstate; US; State; Business; Spurs; Suffixed; Scenic; Heritage
← AR 384	→ AR 386

Arkansas Highway 385 is a designation for two state highways in White County, Arkansas. One segment of 8.98 miles (14.45 km) runs from Highway 11 in Griffithville north to Highway 36 in Kensett. A second segment of 6.23 miles (10.03 km) runs from Highway 367 in Judsonia to Highway 157 at Plainview.

== Route description ==
=== Griffithville to Kensett ===
Highway 385 begins in Griffithville at Highway 11. The route passes two properties on the National Register of Historic Places: the J.A. Neaville House and A.J. Smith House. The route heads north to Highway 87 in Kensett, where it terminates.

=== Judsonia to Plainview ===
Arkansas Highway 385 begins in Judsonia at Highway 367. Highway 385 runs south as Judson Ave, passing the Grand Army of the Republic Memorial within Evergreen Cemetery, the Judsonia High School Gymnasium near Judsonia High School, and the Judsonia Community Building Historic District. The route runs south until reaching the Little Red River, after which the road turns west and becomes Hopkins Dr. Highway 385 continues west, intersecting first Highway 367 and I-57/US 64/US 67/US 167 further west. The highway next turns north to terminate at Highway 157 at Plainview.

Highway 385 within Judsonia was formerly US 67 City, and earlier US 67, a mainline cross-country auto route. The history is still apparent today from the numerous properties along its curbs listed on the National Register of Historic Places.

== Major intersections ==
The entire route is in White County.

Location	mi	km	Destinations	Notes
Griffithville	0.0	0.0	AR 11 (Walker Road) – Des Arc, Searcy	Southern terminus
Kensett	8.98	14.45	AR 36 (Wilbur D. Mills Road)	Northern terminus
Gap in route
Judsonia	0.0	0.0	AR 367 – Bald Knob	Northern terminus; former US 67
Judsonia	2.43	3.91	AR 367 – Searcy, Bald Knob	Former US 67
	2.75	4.43	I-57 / US 64 / US 67 / US 167 – Searcy, Little Rock, Bald Knob, St. Louis	Exit 48 on I-57
Plainview	6.23	10.03	AR 157 – Providence, Judsonia	Southern terminus
1.000 mi = 1.609 km; 1.000 km = 0.621 mi

== History ==
Arkansas Highway 385 first became a state highway in 1966. The graded dirt route ran north from US 67 to Plainview. The segment in downtown Judsonia was designated U.S. Route 67 City at this time. (US 67 City was a former alignment of US 67.) The southerly route of Highway 385 was first built as a graded dirt road across Cypress Bayou in 1966, but was not yet designated a state highway. The following year, Highway 385 was paved from the US 67/US 67C intersection to Plainview. The southerly route was added to the system in 1970, and paved in 1973. In 1976, US 67 was moved slightly west into today's US 67/US 167 alignment, with the former highway becoming Highway 367. This realignment meant the US 67C needed to be redesignated, and it became Highway 385.
