= White County Central School District =

School district in Arkansas, United States

Location
- 3259 AR 157, Judsonia, Arkansas 72081 United States

District information
- Grades: PK–12
- Accreditation: Arkansas Department of Education
- Schools: 2
- NCES District ID: 0504170

Students and staff
- Students: 712
- Teachers: 59.89 (on FTE)
- Staff: 118.89 (on FTE)
- Student–teacher ratio: 11.89
- District mascot: Bears
- Colors: Maroon; White

Other information
- Website: www.wccsd.k12.ar.us

White County Central School District is a public school district based in unincorporated White County, Arkansas, United States, near the Providence community, north of Judsonia. The district encompasses 59.32 square miles (153.6 km^{2}) of land including a small northwestern portion of the city limits of Judsonia (the majority of the city being served by the Riverview School District). Schools in the district provide early childhood, elementary and secondary education to Providence and Steprock, as well as surrounding unincorporated communities in central White County along the Arkansas Highway 157 corridor, and near Pangburn and Bald Knob.

== Schools ==
- White County Central High School, located north of Judsonia and serving more than 250 students in grades 7 through 12.
- White County Central Elementary School, located north of Judsonia and serving more than 425 students in pre-kindergarten through grade 6.
