= Tobe Hoofman Farmstead =

Historic house in Arkansas, United States

- U.S. National Register of Historic Places
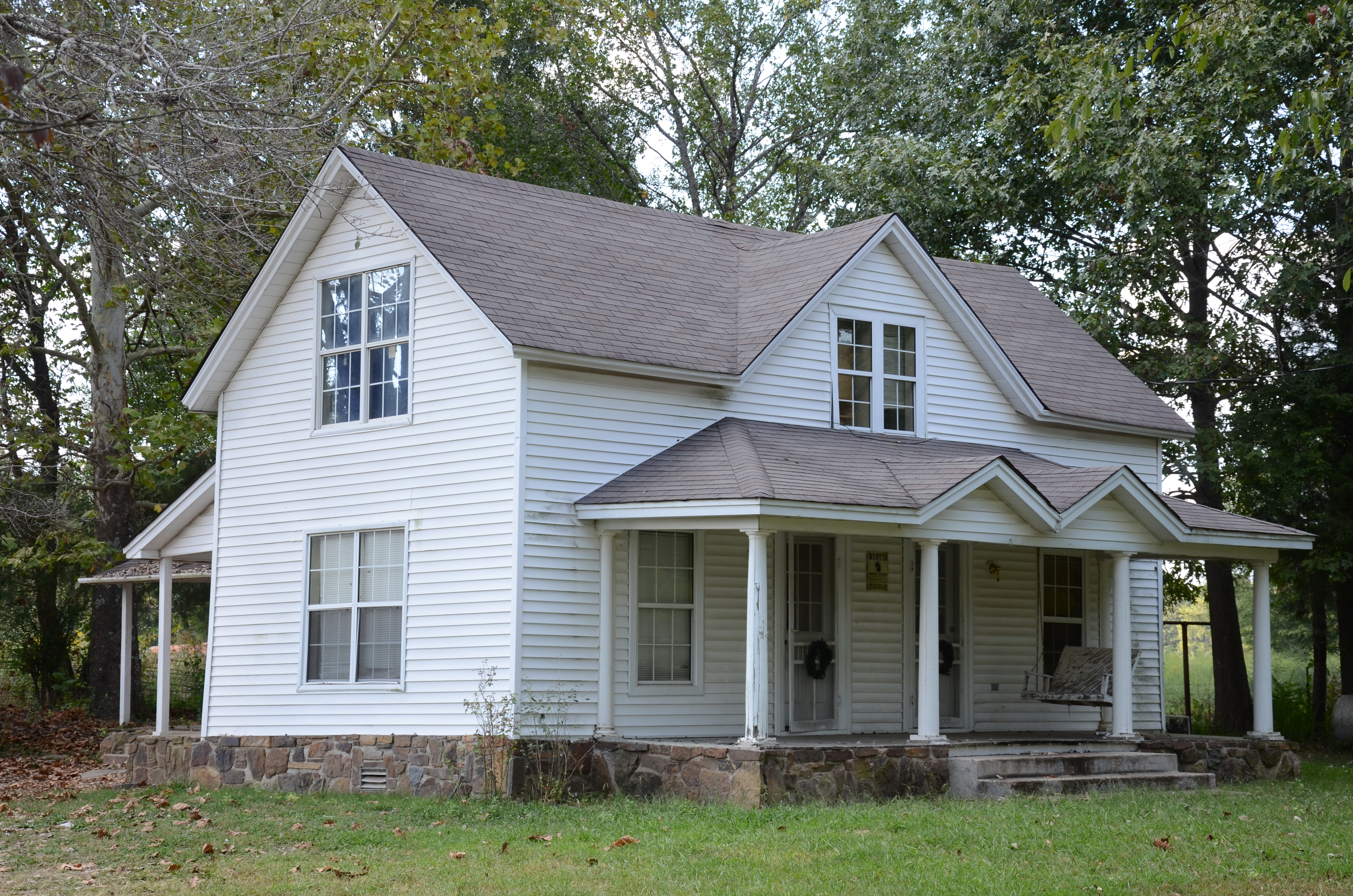
- Nearest city: Providence, Arkansas
- Area: 39.2 acres (15.9 ha)
- Built: 1910
- Architectural style: Vernacular plain traditional
- MPS: White County MPS
- NRHP reference No.: 91001238
- Added to NRHP: July 22, 1992

The Tobe Hoofman Farmstead is a historic farm property in rural White County, Arkansas. It is located on the west side of Arkansas Highway 13 north of Judsonia and Arkansas Highway 157. The property includes a farmhouse, wellhouse, barn, and storm cellar on about 40 acres (16 ha) of land. The farmhouse is a vernacular 1 1/2-story wood-frame building, with a gable roof and a hip-roof porch with small gables over its access stairs. The wellhouse is a small wood-frame structure with a hip roof; the storm cellar is an earthen structure, mostly below ground, with a small above-ground access building. The barn is a transverse crib wood-frame structure with a gable roof. The farmstead was developed about 1910, and is a little-altered example of an early 20th-century farmstead.

The property was listed on the National Register of Historic Places in 1992.

== See also ==
- National Register of Historic Places listings in White County, Arkansas
