= Stanley Simpson Farmstead Picking Shed =

- U.S. National Register of Historic Places
- Location within Arkansas Location within the United States
- Location: Co. Rd. 390 W of jct. with AR 157, Providence, Arkansas
- Coordinates: 35°22′44″N 91°41′25″W
- Area: less than one acre
- Architectural style: Mobile picking shed
- MPS: White County MPS
- NRHP reference No.: 91001342
- Added to NRHP: September 13, 1991

The Stanley Simpson Farmstead Picking Shed is a historic farm outbuilding in rural northern White County, Arkansas. It is located off Pond Road (County Road 390) west of Arkansas Highway 157, north of Judsonia and the hamlet of Providence. It is a small single story wood-frame structure, with a gabled roof, vertical board siding, and a foundation that consists of long wooden sled runners. Probably built sometime between 1914 and 1939, it is the only known example in the county of a mobile strawberry picking and packing shed, designed to be moved around strawberry fields by horse at harvest time.

The building was listed on the National Register of Historic Places in 1991.

== See also ==
- National Register of Historic Places listings in White County, Arkansas
