= Hoag House =

Historic house in Arkansas, United States

- U.S. National Register of Historic Places
- Location within Arkansas Location within the United States
- Nearest city: Judsonia, Arkansas
- Coordinates: 35°17′7″N 91°37′49″W
- Area: less than one acre
- Built: 1900
- Architectural style: Vernacular box construction
- MPS: White County MPS
- NRHP reference No.: 91001236
- Added to NRHP: July 21, 1992

The Hoag House is a historic house in Judsonia, Arkansas. It is located on a wooded lot northeast of the junction of Arkansas Highways 157 and 367 in the northeastern part of the town. It is a rambling two-story wood-frame structure, with central section oriented north–south, and projecting gabled sections on the east and west sides. A two-story turret stands at the northeast junction of the main and eastern sections, topped by a pyramidal roof with gable dormers. A single-story porch with Victorian decoration wraps around the outside of the turret, joining the northern and eastern sections. Built about 1900, the house is locally distinctive for its central two-story box structure, and its Folk Victorian styling.

The house was listed on the National Register of Historic Places in 1992. It has been listed as destroyed in the Arkansas Historic Preservation Program database.

== See also ==
- National Register of Historic Places listings in White County, Arkansas
