= Griffithville School =

- U.S. National Register of Historic Places
- Location within Arkansas Location within the United States
- Location: AR 11 W of jct. with AR 385, Griffithville, Arkansas
- Coordinates: 35°7′14″N 91°38′54″W
- Area: less than one acre
- Built: 1939
- Built by: Works Progress Administration
- Architectural style: Bungalow/American craftsman
- MPS: White County MPS
- NRHP reference No.: 91001357
- Added to NRHP: July 13, 1992

The Griffithville School was a historic school building, located on the south side of Arkansas Highway 11 on the west side of Griffithville, Arkansas. Built in 1939, it was the community's only school, and was a fine example of a Craftsman-style school built with Works Progress Administration funding. It was a rectangular frame structure, finished in brick veneer and capped by a gable-on-hip roof with exposed rafter ends in the eaves. Entrances were sheltered by gable-roofed porches supported by brick piers.

The building was listed on the National Register of Historic Places in 1992. It has been listed as destroyed in the Arkansas Historic Preservation Program database.

== See also ==
- National Register of Historic Places listings in White County, Arkansas
