= A.J. Smith House =

Historic house in Arkansas, United States

- A. J. Smith House
- U.S. National Register of Historic Places
- Location within Arkansas Location within the United States
- Location: AR 385, Griffithville, Arkansas
- Coordinates: 35°7′35″N 91°38′41″W
- Area: less than one acre
- Built: 1887
- Architectural style: Vernacular T-shape
- MPS: White County MPS
- NRHP reference No.: 91001223
- Added to NRHP: September 5, 1991

The A.J. Smith House was a historic house on Arkansas Highway 385 in Griffithville, Arkansas. It was a two-story wood-frame structure, with a T-shaped gable-roofed structure, weatherboard siding, and a foundation of brick piers. A hip-roofed porch extended across the front of the projecting T section and around the side. The house was built about 1887, and was one of White County's few surviving 19th-century houses.

The house was listed on the National Register of Historic Places in 1991. It has been listed as destroyed in the Arkansas Historic Preservation Program database.

== See also ==
- National Register of Historic Places listings in White County, Arkansas
