= Riverview School District =

Riverview School District may refer to a school district in the United States:

- Riverview School District (Arkansas)
- Riverview School District (Pennsylvania)
- Riverview School District (Washington)
