= White County Central High School =

Location
- 3259 AR 157; Judsonia, Arkansas 72081; United States; 35°21′29″N 91°40′37″W

Information
- Established: 1947 (79 years ago)
- Status: Open
- School district: White County Central School District
- NCES District ID: 0504170
- Oversight: Arkansas Department of Education (ADE)
- CEEB code: 041275
- NCES School ID: 050417000156
- Principal: Mark Wagner
- Faculty: 28.70
- Grades: 7–12
- Enrollment: 370 (2024–25)
- Student to teacher ratio: 10.00
- Education system: ADE Smart Core curriculum
- Classes offered: Regular, Advanced Placement
- Campus type: Rural
- Colors: Maroon and white
- Athletics conference: 2A 5 (2024-2026/Basketball, Baseball & Softball)
- Mascot: Bear
- Nickname: WCC
- Team name: White County Central Bears
- Accreditation: ADE; AdvancED (1924–)
- Affiliation: Arkansas Activities Association (AAA)
- Website: www.wccsd.k12.ar.us/page/WCC%20High%20School%20%20Grades%209-12

White County Central High School is a comprehensive public high school based in Judsonia, Arkansas, United States. Located in central White County as the name implies, WCC High School is the sole high school managed by the White County Central School District and serves more than 370 students in grades seven through twelve.

== History ==
Judsonia and Judson University were named in honor of American Baptist foreign missionary Adoniram Judson. The school started as an academy in 1871 and by 1874 received a state charter as a university. The university closed three years later. In 1937, the Works Progress Administration (WPA) funded a project to include a gymnasium at the Judsonia School.

Per the district website, White County Central was created in 1946 by the merging of the Providence and Plainview School Districts. The two schools maintained their separate identities for the 1946-47 school year while a new school was being built. The two former high school campuses would be maintained as Providence and Plainview Elementary Schools. To save money, the new school buildings were built with materials taken from the World War II airfield being dismantled at Newport, Arkansas. Volunteers from both communities took their trucks and tools and hauled the lumber and fixtures back from Newport and built a high school building, an agricultural building and a shop. Students would be bussed to the elementary campuses for lunch and to Plainviews' gym for physical education (P.E.) until the new school could be finished. However, it was not until 1960 that the schools were located on one campus.

The 1947-48 school year marked the beginning of Central's existence as a new school. In the spring of 1948, the first group of graduates received their diplomas from what is now known as White County Central School.

The school was constructed on a site acquired from Charles H. "Charley" Baker, who lived in the two story farmhouse on the corner. The original building burned to the ground in 1952, and the students were again bussed to Plainview while a new building was constructed. The cause of the fire may have been overloaded electrical circuits, because large bulbs were seen screwed into the fuse panel in the hallway. The current campus includes the land once occupied by the farmhouse and the student body is much larger.

== Curriculum ==
The assumed course of study at WCC High School is the Smart Core curriculum developed by the Arkansas Department of Education (ADE). Students engage in regular (core and career focus) courses and exams and may select Advanced Placement (AP) coursework and exams that provide an opportunity for college credit before graduation. Exceptional students have been recognized as National Merit Finalists and participated in Arkansas Governor's School.

== Athletics ==
The White County Central High School mascot is the Bear with maroon and white serving as the school colors.

For the 2012–2014 seasons, the WCC Bears participated in the 2A Classification—the state's second smallest conference—within the 2A Region 2 Conference. Competition is primarily sanctioned by the Arkansas Activities Association with the Bears competing in basketball (boys/girls), cheer, cross country (boys/girls), and track and field (boys/girls).

In 2021, the WCC Sr. Boys Basketball Team advanced to the 2A state semifinals, defeating the Dierks Outlaws 56-45 in the quarterfinals. The Bears lost the semifinal game 40-64 to the eventual 2A state champions, the Lee Trojans.

For the 2024-2026 seasons, the Bears participate in the 2A Classification within the 2A-5 Conference. The Bears compete in baseball (boys), basketball (boys/girls), cheer, cross country (boys/girls), golf (boys/girls), softball (girls), and track & field (boys/girls).
