= Grand Army of the Republic Memorial (Judsonia, Arkansas) =

- U.S. National Register of Historic Places
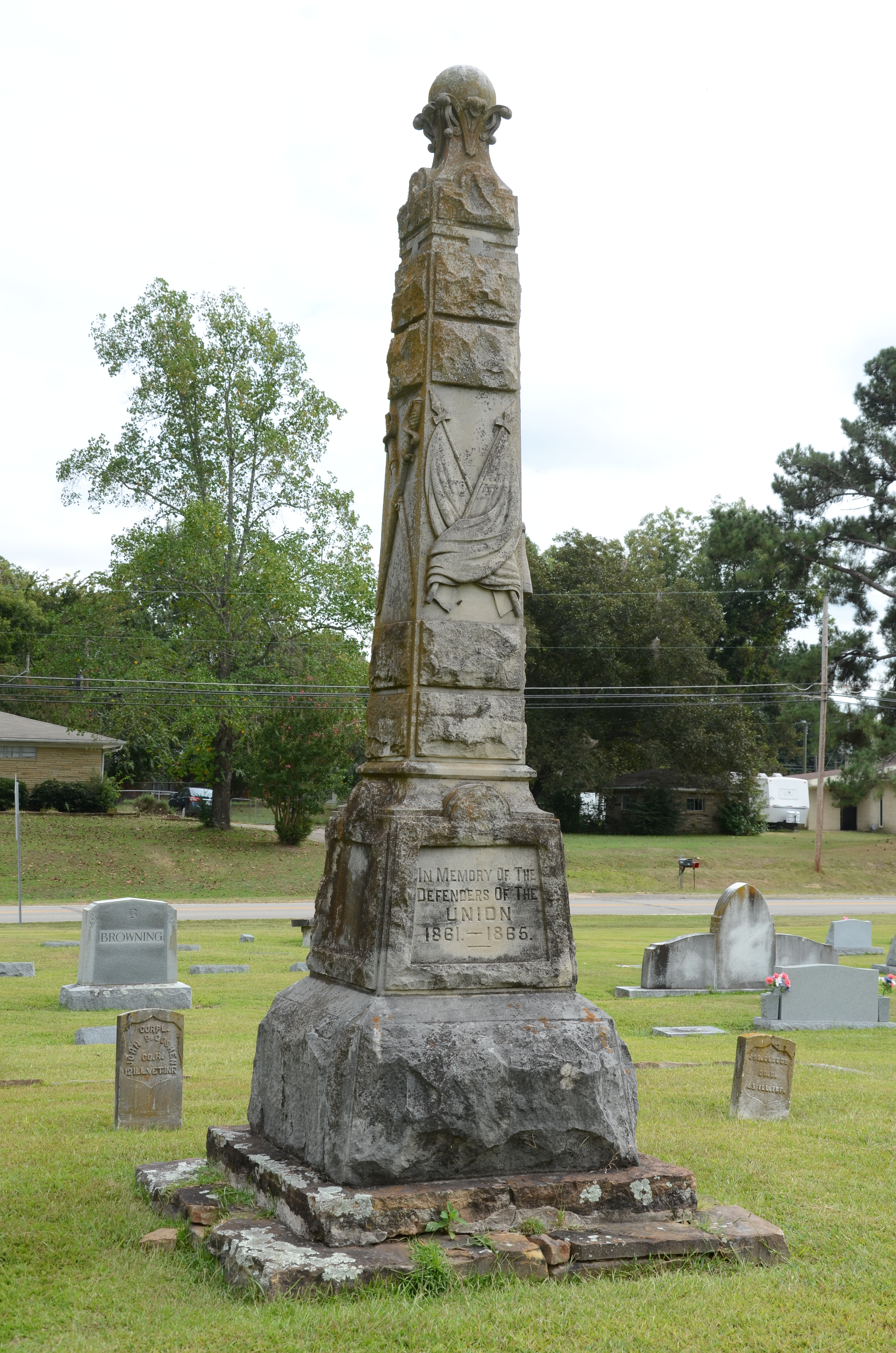

- Location within Arkansas Location within the United States
- Location: Evergreen Cemetery, approximately .25 mi. S of jct. of AR 367 on AR 385, Judsonia, Arkansas
- Coordinates: 35°16′41″N 91°38′25″W
- Area: less than one acre
- Built: 1894
- Built by: Morriss Brothers
- Architectural style: Classical Revival
- MPS: Civil War Commemorative Sculpture MPS
- NRHP reference No.: 96000502
- Added to NRHP: May 3, 1996

The Grand Army of the Republic Monument of Judsonia, Arkansas is located in the city's Evergreen Cemetery, on Judson Avenue north of its downtown. The monument consists of a rusticated fieldstone base, on which a cubical stone with inscriptions has been set. This is topped by an obelisk-like tapering marble element with a square cross section, which is topped by a sphere adorned with floral detailing. It is set in a square area 31 feet (9.4 m) on each side, in which a number of Union Army soldiers are buried. The monument was placed in 1894 by the local chapter of the Grand Army of the Republic, a Union Army veterans' organization. White County, where Judsonia is located, was divided in the war, with men from the county serving on both sides in the conflict.

The memorial was listed on the National Register of Historic Places in 1996.

== See also ==
- National Register of Historic Places listings in White County, Arkansas
