= James W. Edie House =

Historic house in Arkansas, United States

- U.S. National Register of Historic Places
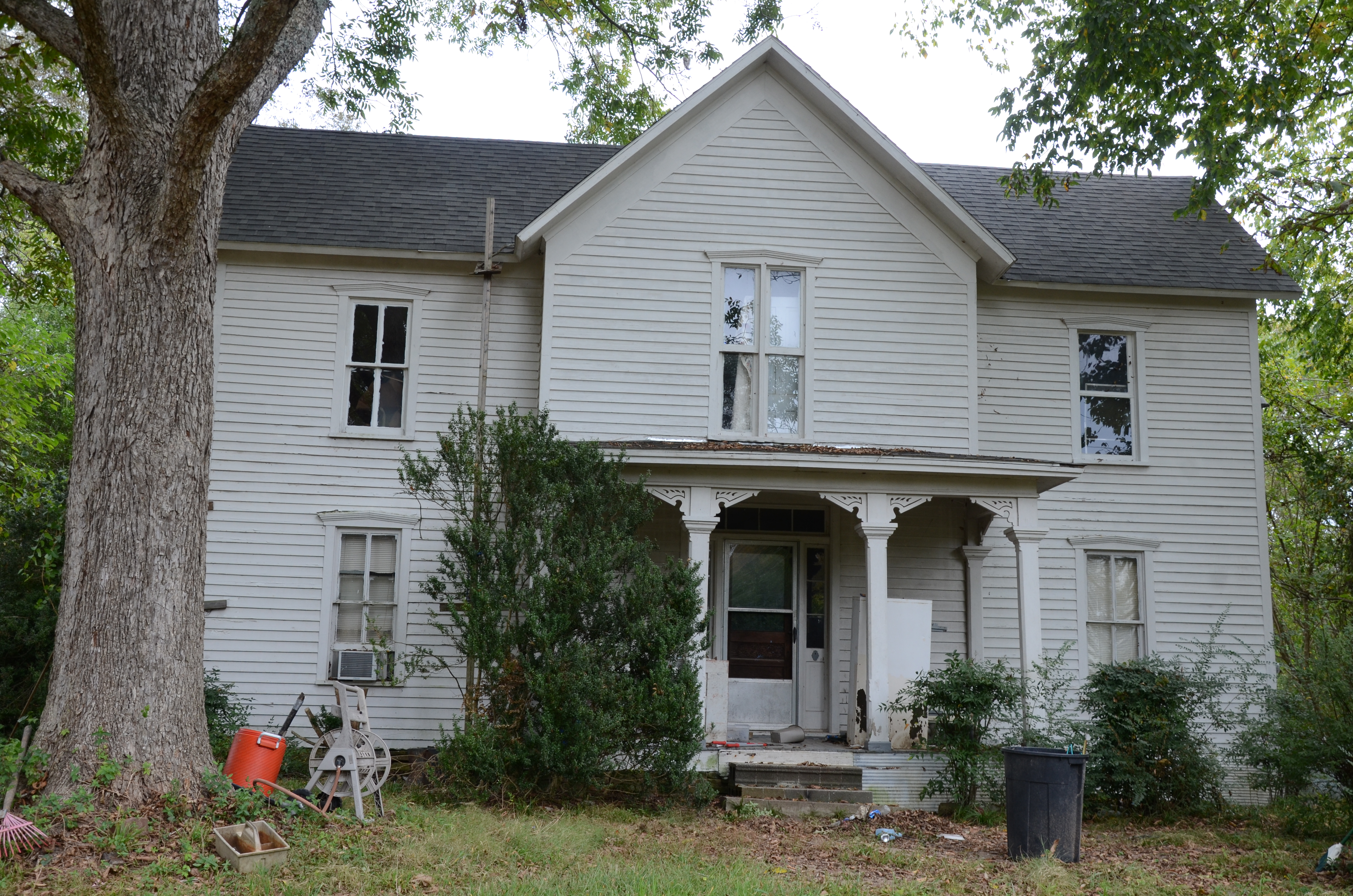

- Location within Arkansas Location within the United States
- Location: Jct. of Jackson and Washington Sts., Judsonia, Arkansas
- Coordinates: 35°16′7″N 91°38′18″W
- Area: less than one acre
- Built: 1883
- MPS: White County MPS
- NRHP reference No.: 91001189
- Added to NRHP: September 5, 1991

The James W. Edie House is a historic house at Jackson and Washington Streets in Judsonia, Arkansas. It is a two-story wood-frame structure, with a side gable roof, weatherboard siding, and a stone pier foundation. A cross gable section projects from the center of the front facade, with a single-story porch spanning its width. It is supported by wooden columns with capitals at the top, and has decorative jigsawn balustrades and brackets. Built in 1883, it is one of White County's few surviving 19th-century houses.

The house was listed on the National Register of Historic Places in 1991.

== See also ==
- National Register of Historic Places listings in White County, Arkansas
