= Capt. Larned House =

Historic house in Arkansas, United States

- U.S. National Register of Historic Places
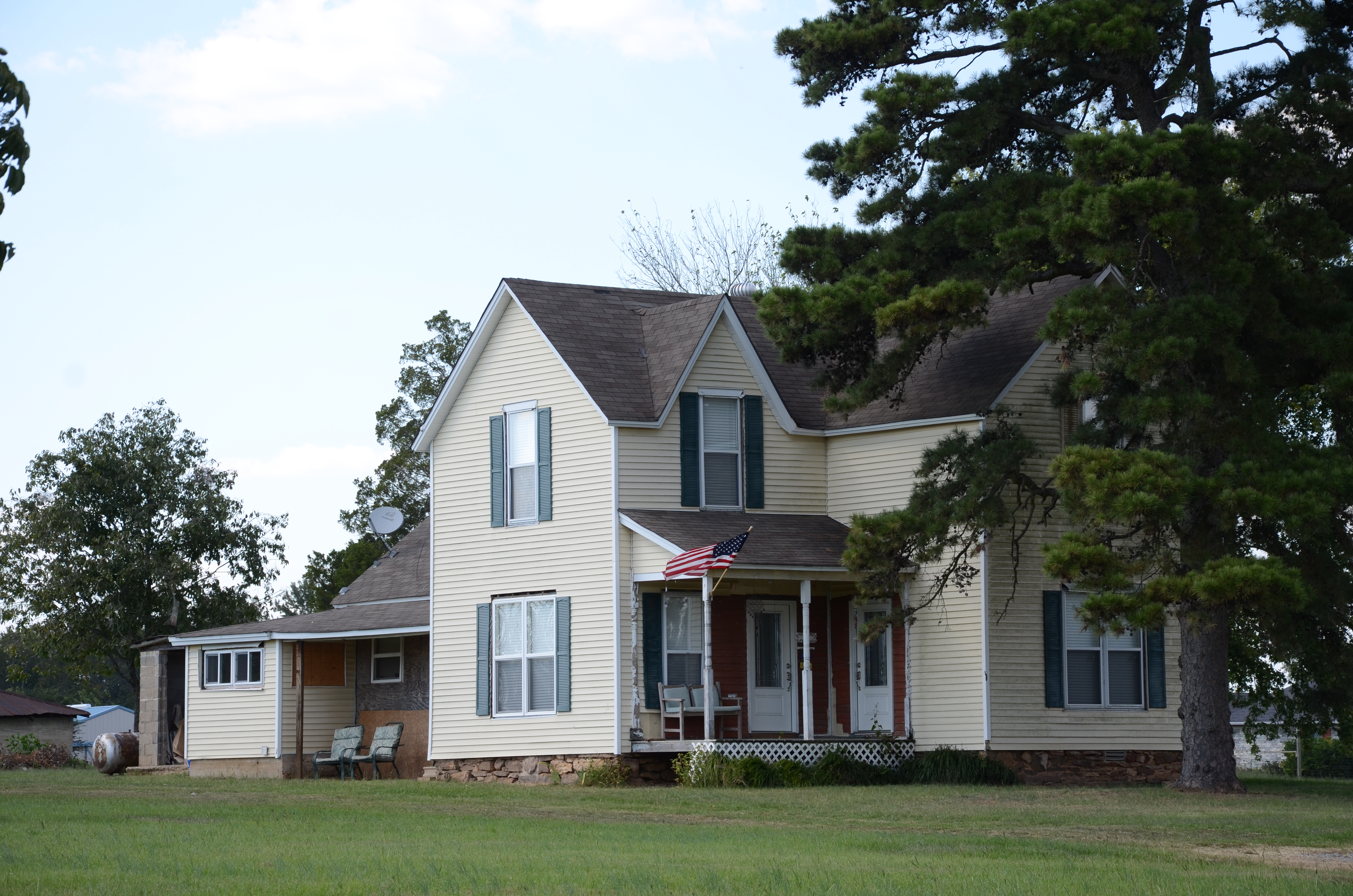

- Location within Arkansas Location within the United States
- Nearest city: Highway 157 north of U.S. Highway 64 Judsonia, Arkansas
- Coordinates: 35°18′14″N 91°38′37″W
- Area: 2 acres (0.81 ha)
- Built: 1905
- Architectural style: Queen Anne, Folk Victorian
- MPS: White County MPS
- NRHP reference No.: 91001235
- Added to NRHP: July 22, 1992

The Capt. Larned House is a historic house on Arkansas Highway 157, near its junction with Moss Drive north of Judsonia, Arkansas. It is a two-story L-shaped wood-frame structure, with a gabled roof, weatherboard siding, and a foundation of stone, concrete, and brick piers. It is a vernacular expression of Queen Anne styling, with turned posts and scrolled brackets on its porches. Built about 1905, it is one of the Judsonia area's finer examples of the style.

The house was listed on the National Register of Historic Places in 1992.

== See also ==
- National Register of Historic Places listings in White County, Arkansas
