= Alfred W. Henson House =

Historic house in Arkansas, United States

- U.S. National Register of Historic Places
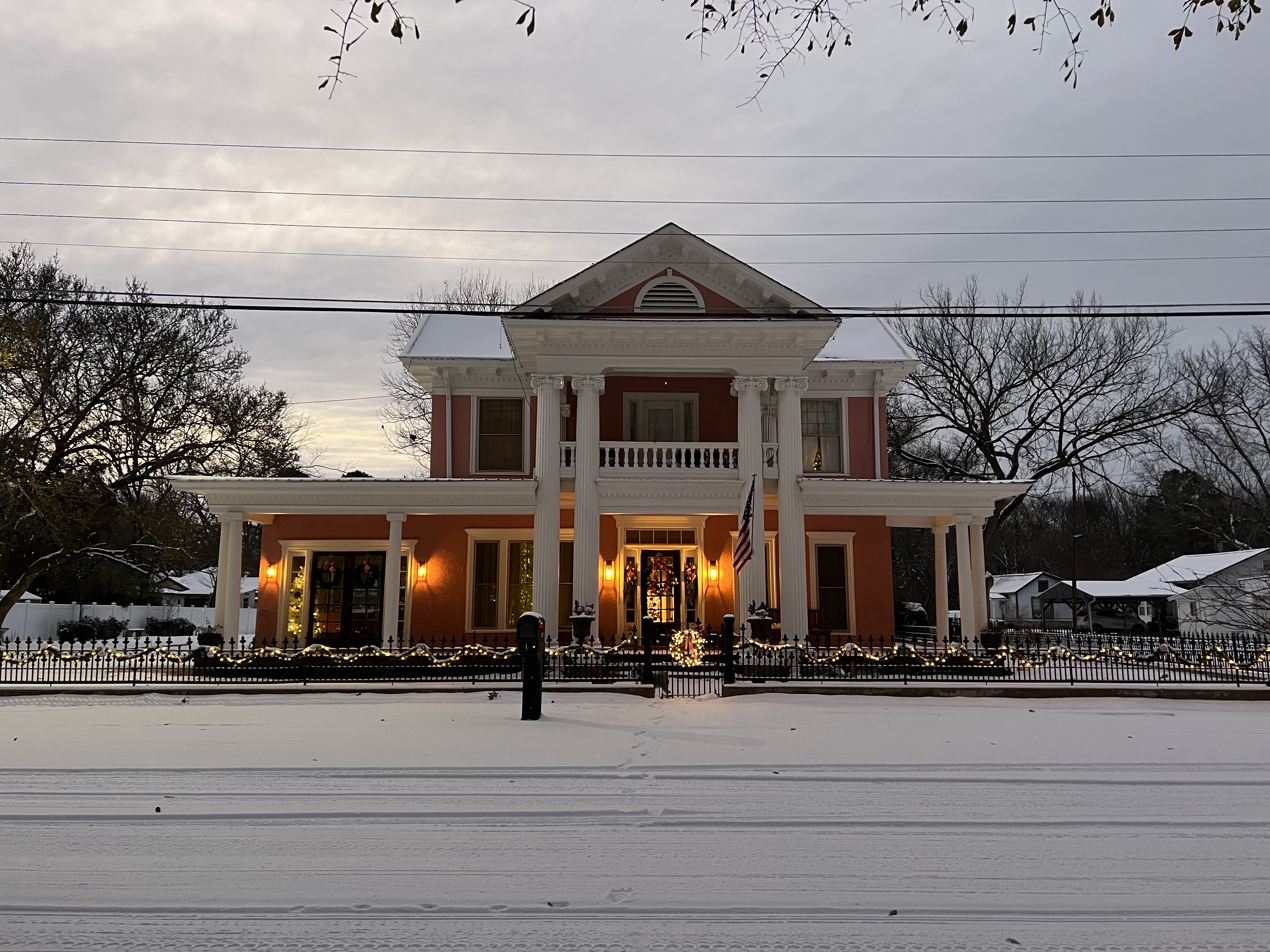

- Location within Arkansas Location within the United States
- Location: 111 Main St. Judsonia, Arkansas
- Coordinates: 35°16′14″N 91°38′27″W
- Area: less than one acre
- Built: 1920
- Architectural style: Classical Revival
- NRHP reference No.: 86002938
- Added to NRHP: October 23, 1986

The Alfred W. Henson House was a historic house at 111 Main Street in Judsonia, Arkansas. It was a 2 1/2-story wood-frame structure, with elaborate Classical Revival styling. Its roof line and gable rakes were modillioned, and a gabled full-height entrance pavilion, supported by Ionic columns, projected from the main facade. Porches extended across the facade and around the side on both levels, with low turned balustrades. Built about 1884 and restyled in 1920, it was the city's finest residential example of Classical Revival architecture.

The house was listed on the National Register of Historic Places in 1986. It has been listed as destroyed in the Arkansas Historic Preservation Program database.

== See also ==
- National Register of Historic Places listings in White County, Arkansas
