= J.A. Neaville House =

Historic house in Arkansas, United States

- J. A. Neaville House
- U.S. National Register of Historic Places
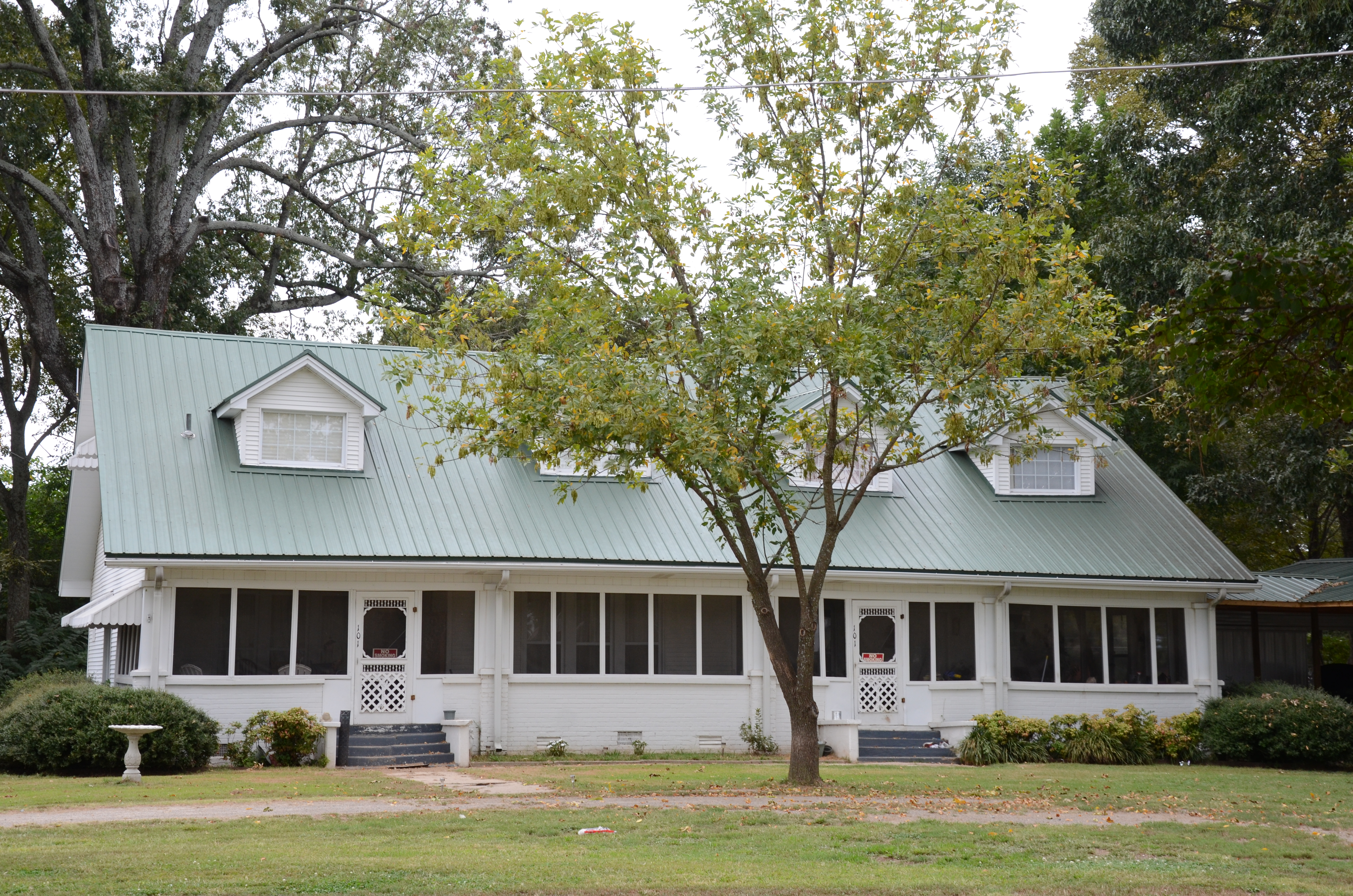

- Location within Arkansas Location within the United States
- Location: AR 385 at Len Ave., Griffithville, Arkansas
- Coordinates: 35°7′26″N 91°38′40″W
- Area: less than one acre
- Built: 1899, remodeled in 1917
- Architectural style: Bungalow/craftsman
- MPS: White County MPS
- NRHP reference No.: 91001356
- Added to NRHP: July 22, 1992

The J.A. Neaville House is a historic house at the northeast corner of Arkansas Highway 385 and Len Avenue in Griffithville, Arkansas. It is a 1 1/2-story wood-frame structure, with weatherboard siding and a brick foundation. It has Craftsman styling, with doghouse dormers in the roof, and a broad screened porch under the roof, whose rafter ends are exposed. The core portion of the house was built in 1899, and was enlarged and restyled in 1917.

The house was listed on the National Register of Historic Places in 1992.

== See also ==
- National Register of Historic Places listings in White County, Arkansas
