= Big Four School =

- U.S. National Register of Historic Places
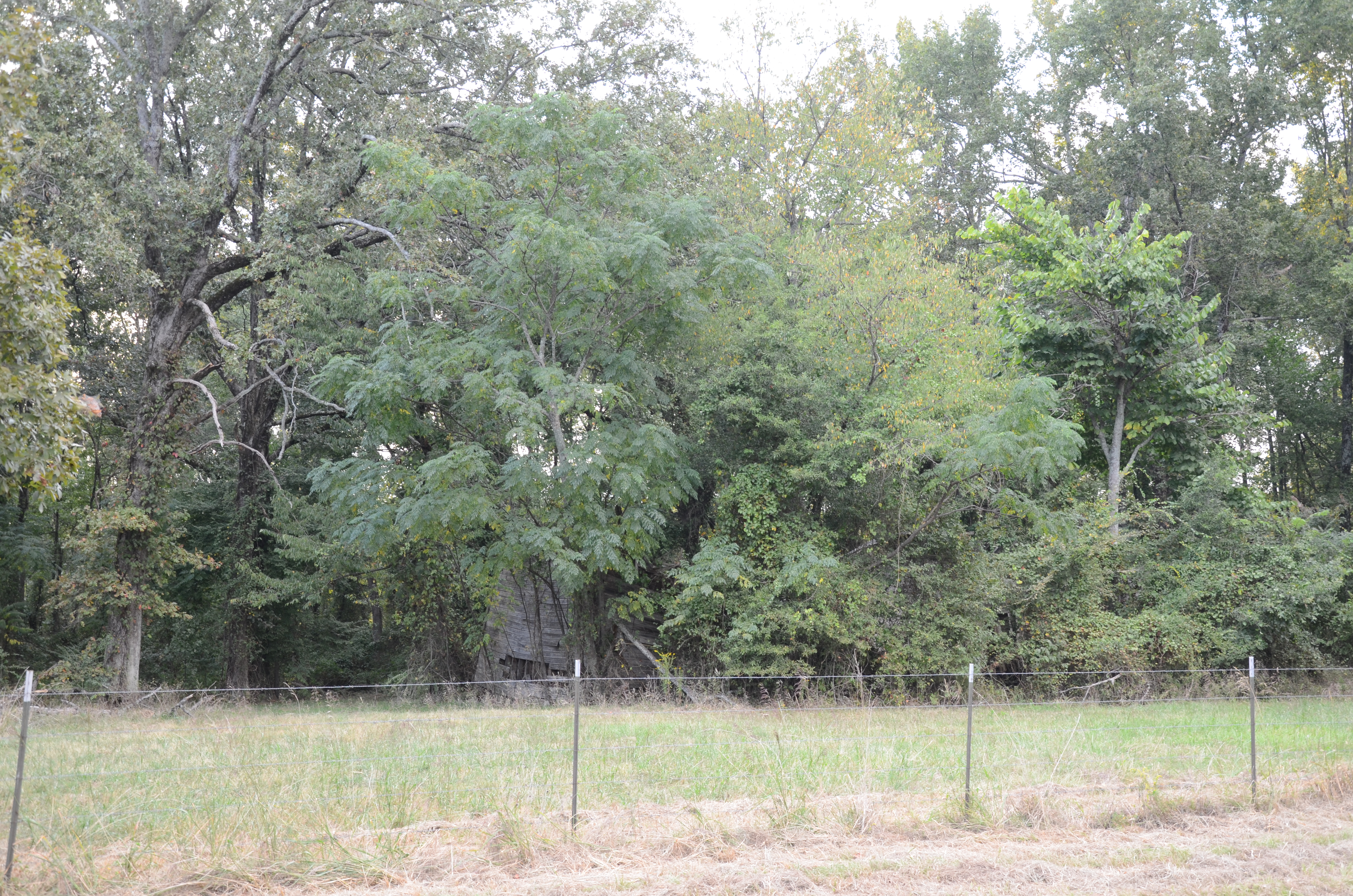
- Big Four School, in 2015

- Location within Arkansas Location within the United States
- Nearest city: Providence, Arkansas
- Coordinates: 35°20′44″N 91°38′34″W
- Area: less than one acre
- Built by: Works Projects Administration
- Architect: Works Projects Administration
- MPS: White County MPS
- NRHP reference No.: 91001192
- Added to NRHP: July 10, 1992

The Big Four School was a historic school building in rural White County, Arkansas. Located on the west side of County Road 383, it was a vernacular single-story wood-frame structure, whose exterior was finished in novelty siding. The front entrances were sheltered by a single gable-roofed portico supported by columns on piers. The building was constructed in 1915, but was extensively altered in the 1930s with Works Progress Administration funding. The building was rare because of its siding, and because of its association with the WPA. When listed on the National Register of Historic Places in 1992, it was described as abandoned and in deteriorating condition. It has been listed as destroyed in the Arkansas Historic Preservation Program database.

== See also ==
- National Register of Historic Places listings in White County, Arkansas
