= Louis Gray Homestead, Barn =

- U.S. National Register of Historic Places
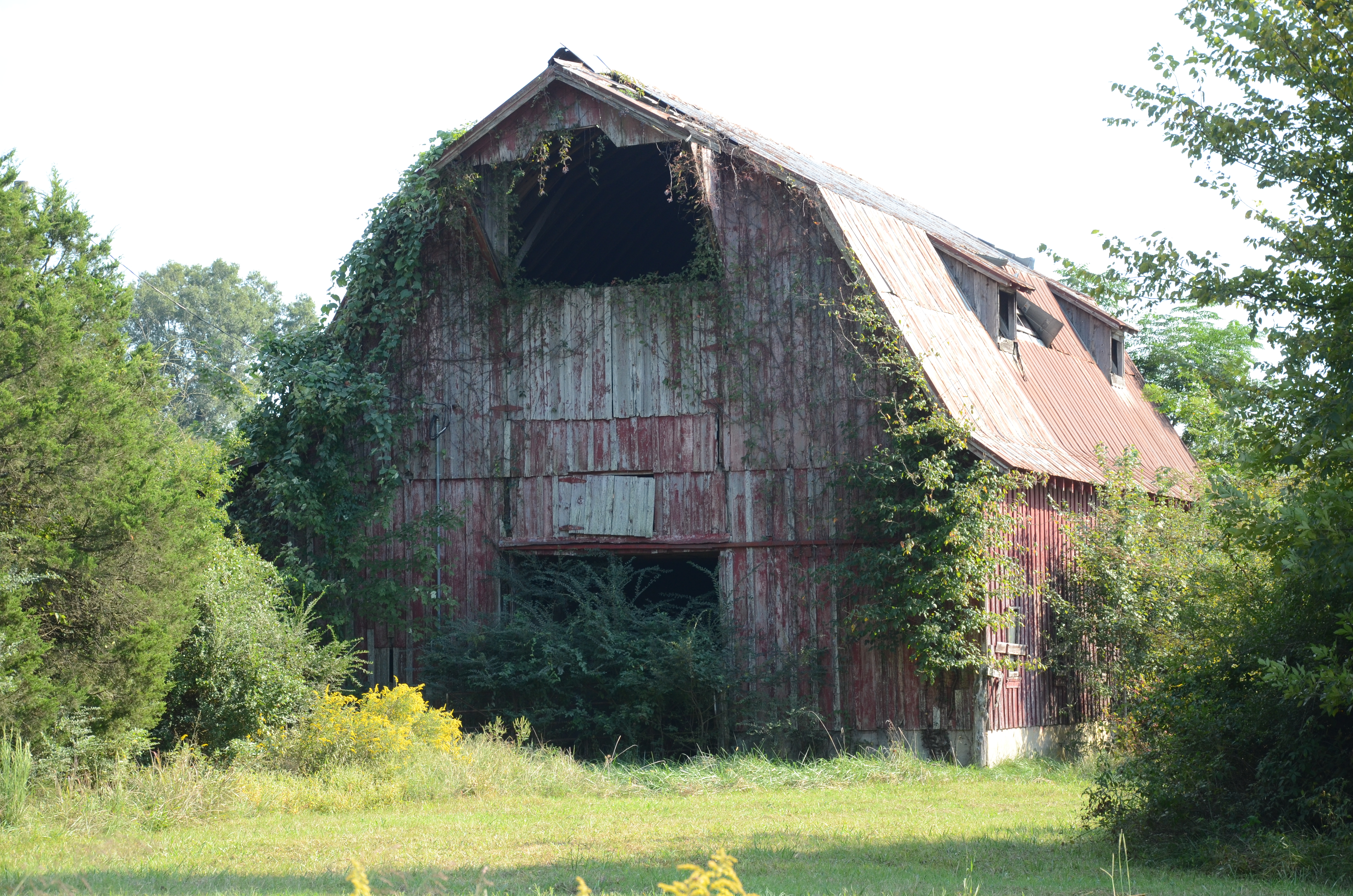
- September 2015 photo

- Location within Arkansas Location within the United States
- Nearest city: Plainview, Arkansas
- Coordinates: 35°18′48″N 91°39′18″W
- Area: less than one acre
- Built: 1932
- Architectural style: Vernacular transverse-crib barn
- MPS: White County MPS
- NRHP reference No.: 91001194
- Added to NRHP: July 21, 1992

The Louis Gray Homestead, Barn is a historic barn in rural White County, Arkansas. It is located off Arkansas Highway 157 east of Plainview. It is a two-story frame structure, with a gambrel roof and side shed, and is finished with board-and-batten siding. It is built in a transverse crib plan, with five bays on the left and six on the right, with a hay loft above. It has a hay hood. Built about 1932, it is a well-preserved and little-altered example of this form within the county.

The barn was listed on the National Register of Historic Places in 1992. It has been listed as destroyed in the Arkansas Historic Preservation Program database.

== See also ==
- National Register of Historic Places listings in White County, Arkansas
