= Louis N. Hilger Homestead, Livestock Barn =

- Louis N. Hilger Homestead/Livestock Barn
- U.S. National Register of Historic Places
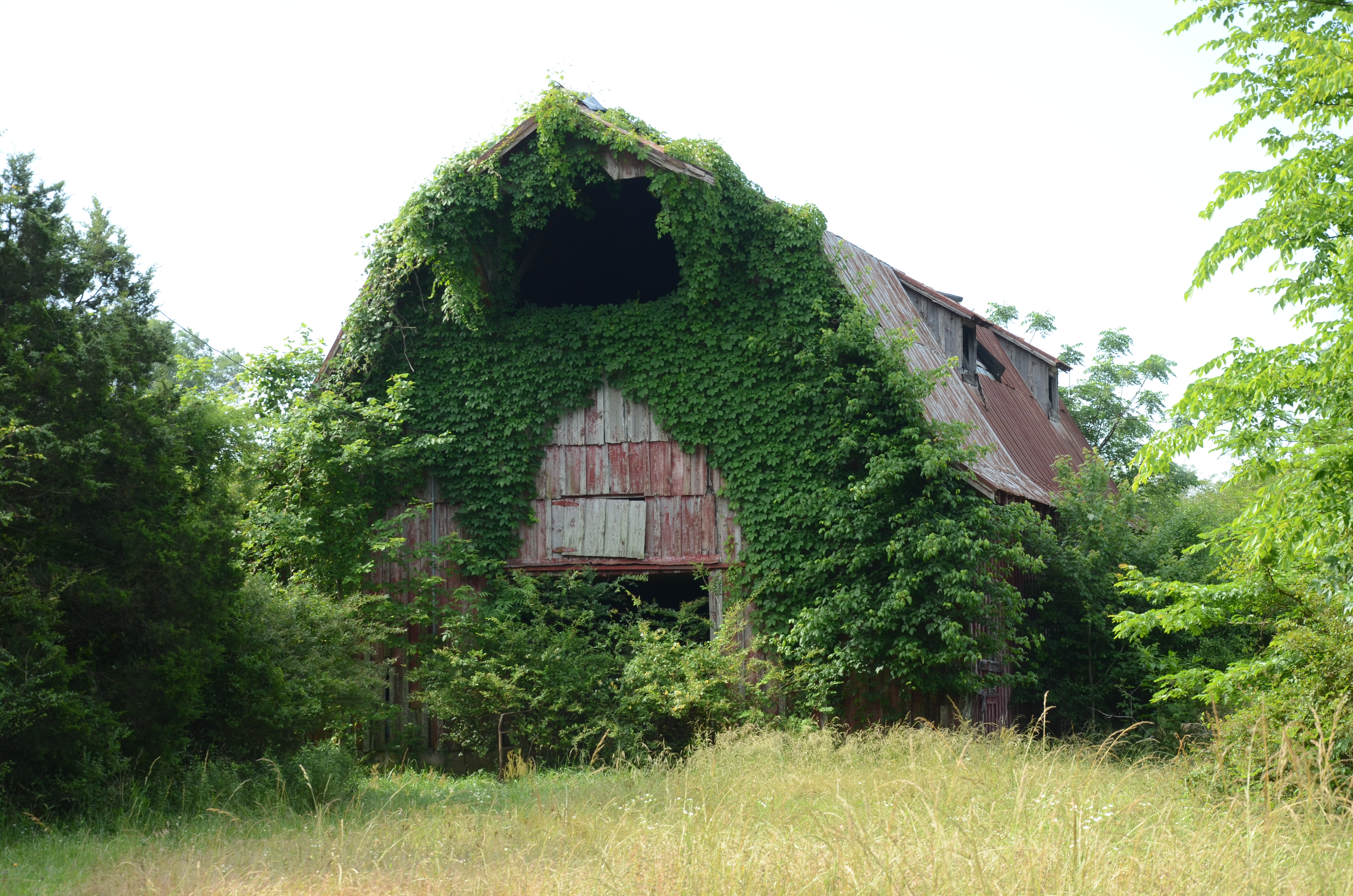

- Location within Arkansas Location within the United States
- Nearest city: Providence, Arkansas
- Coordinates: 35°22′10″N 91°41′31″W
- Area: less than one acre
- Architectural style: Transverse-crib barn
- MPS: White County MPS
- NRHP reference No.: 91001191
- Added to NRHP: July 21, 1992

The Louis N. Hilger Homestead/Livestock Barn is a historic barn in rural northern White County, Arkansas. It is located on the south side of County Road 374 (Warren Road), west of Providence. It is a two-story wood-frame structure, with a gambrel roof, hay hood, board-and-batten siding, and a concrete foundation. It has a transverse crib layout, with a livestock shed extending along one side. It has two shed-roof dormers on the east side, providing light to the interior. It was built in 1939 to house mules used as draught animals for the Hilger dairy operation, and is distinctive within the county for its use of dormers and its extraordinary height, made possible by its braced-frame construction.

The barn was listed on the National Register of Historic Places in 1992.

== See also ==
- National Register of Historic Places listings in White County, Arkansas
