= Judsonia Community Building Historic District =

Historic district in Arkansas, United States

- U.S. National Register of Historic Places
- U.S. Historic district
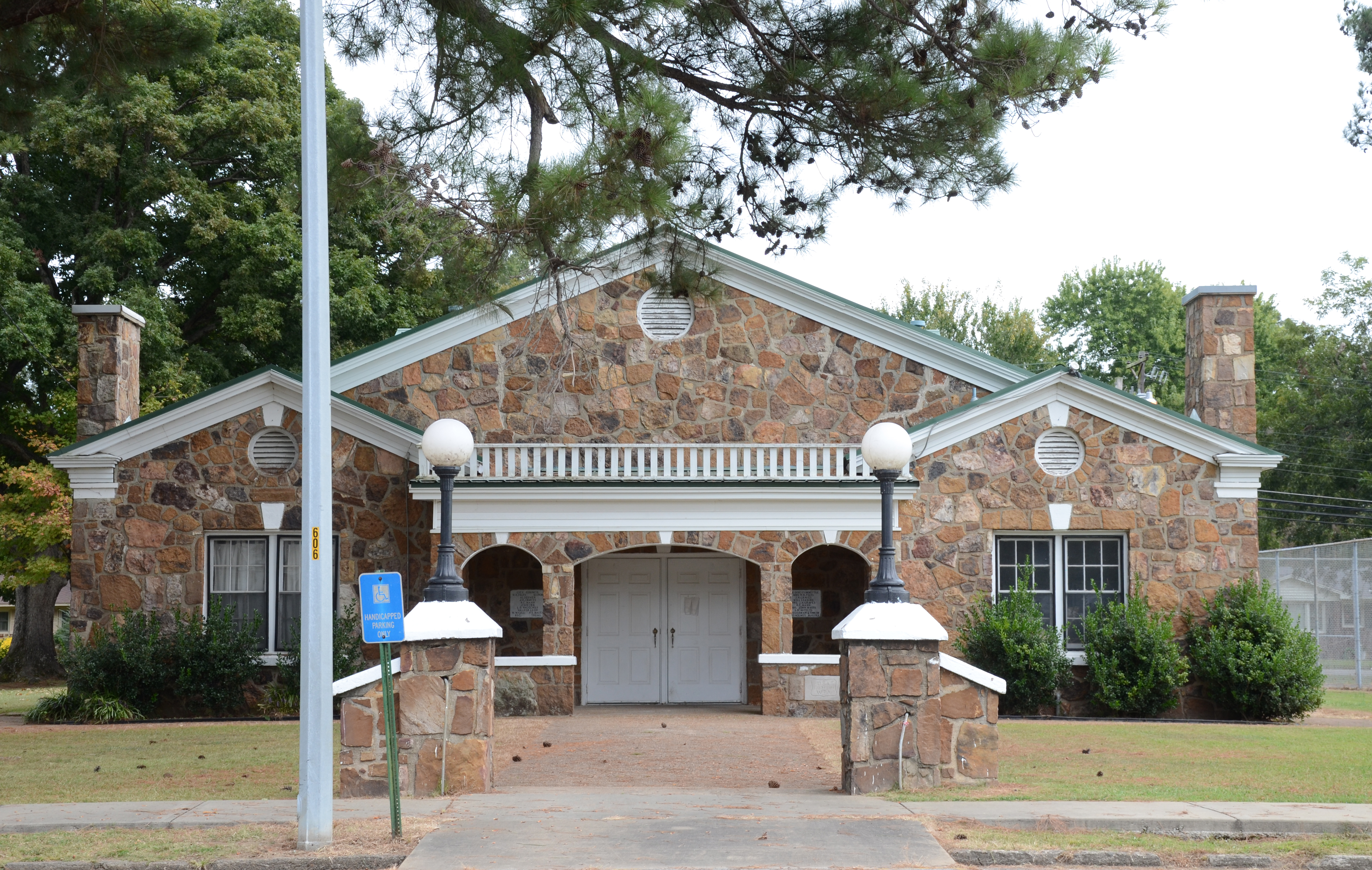

- Location within Arkansas Location within the United States
- Location: Jct. of Judson Ave. and 6th St., Judsonia, Arkansas
- Coordinates: 35°16′22″N 91°38′20″W
- Area: 2 acres (0.81 ha)
- Built: 1939
- Built by: Works Progress Administration
- Architectural style: Colonial Revival, WPA Rustic
- MPS: White County MPS
- NRHP reference No.: 91001234
- Added to NRHP: September 5, 1991

The Judsonia Community Building Historic District encompasses the W.E. Orr City Park in Judsonia, Arkansas, as well as the community building (a public community resource housing an auditorium and other facilities). The park, which had been a public park since 1872, was the subject of a federal Works Progress Administration projects during the Great Depression, a project that also included the construction of the Colonial Revival community building.

The district was listed on the National Register of Historic Places in 1991.

== See also ==
- National Register of Historic Places listings in White County, Arkansas
