= Morris Hartsell Farmstead =

Historic house in Arkansas, United States

- U.S. National Register of Historic Places
- Nearest city: Steprock, Arkansas
- Area: 31.9 acres (12.9 ha)
- Architectural style: Vernacular double-pen
- MPS: White County MPS
- NRHP reference No.: 91001340
- Added to NRHP: September 13, 1991

The Morris Hartsell Farmstead is a historic farm property in northern White County, Arkansas. Located on the north side of Arkansas Highway 157 in the hamlet of Steprock, it has one of the finest assemblages of 19th century farm buildings to be found in the county. Its main house is a single-story double-pen structure with a gable roof and a massive stone chimney at one end. One pen is built out of hand-hewn logs, while the other is framed in dimensional lumber. The second pen dates to about 1880, and the building has been little changed since then. Also included on the property are an equipment shed, and a large timber-framed barn, both of which appear to date to the same time.

The property was listed on the National Register of Historic Places in 1991.

== See also ==
- National Register of Historic Places listings in White County, Arkansas
