= J.C. Rhew Co. Packing Shed =

- J. C. Rhew Co. Packing Shed
- U.S. National Register of Historic Places
- Location within Arkansas Location within the United States
- Nearest city: Providence, Arkansas
- Coordinates: 35°23′57″N 91°38′53″W
- Area: less than one acre
- Architectural style: Strawberry packing shed, Other
- MPS: White County MPS
- NRHP reference No.: 91001343
- Added to NRHP: July 23, 1992

The J. C. Rhew Co. Packing Shed was a strawberry packing house in rural northern White County, Arkansas. It was located on the south side of Graham Road near its junction with Fuller Road, northeast of Providence. It was a single-story wood-frame structure, in the shape of a long rectangle divided into six bays, capped by a gable roof and set on concrete piers. Built about 1939, it was noted for a distinctive floor plan, apparently designed to facilitate the movement of workers through the building.

The building was listed on the National Register of Historic Places in 1992. It has been listed as destroyed in the Arkansas Historic Preservation Program database.

== See also ==
- National Register of Historic Places listings in White County, Arkansas
