= Plainview, White County, Arkansas =

Plainview
- Unincorporated community
- Plainview's position in Arkansas.
- Coordinates: 35°18′45″N 91°40′37″W
- Country: United States
- State: Arkansas
- County: White
- Township: Harrison
- Elevation: 397 ft (121 m)
- Time zone: UTC-6 (Central (CST))
  - Summer (DST): UTC-5 (CDT)
- Area code: 501
- GNIS feature ID: 58397

Plainview is an unincorporated community in Harrison Township, White County, Arkansas, United States. It is located at the intersection of Arkansas Highway 157 and the northern terminus of Arkansas Highway 385.
