= Judsonia Bridge =

- U.S. National Register of Historic Places
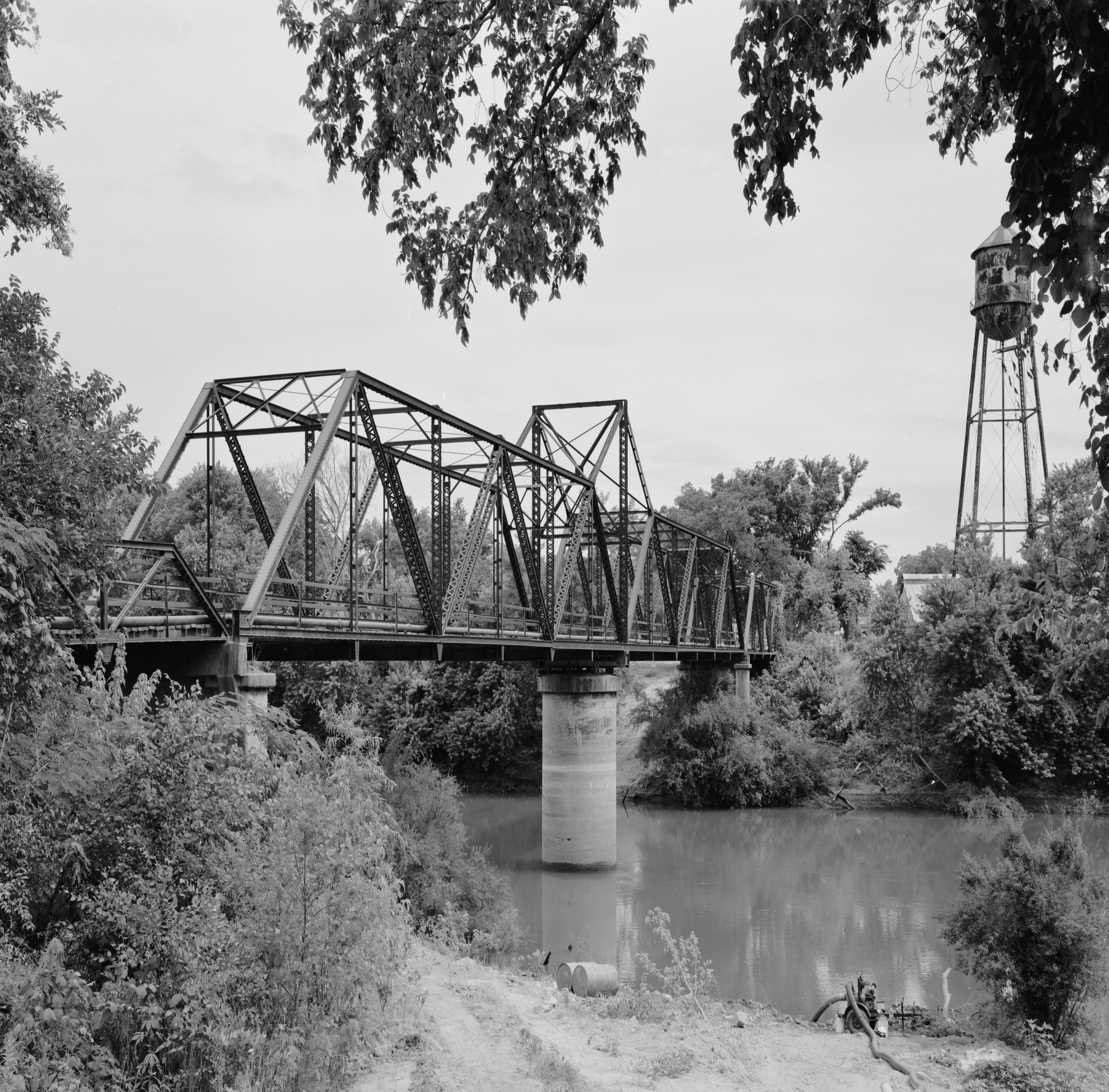
- HAER photo, 1988

- Location within Arkansas Location within the United States
- Location: County Road 66, over the Little Red River, Judsonia, Arkansas
- Coordinates: 35°16′3″N 91°38′23″W
- Area: less than one acre
- Built: 1924
- Built by: R. L. Gaster Construction Co.
- Architectural style: Warren swing through-truss
- MPS: Historic Bridges of Arkansas MPS
- NRHP reference No.: 90000535
- Added to NRHP: April 9, 1990

The Judsonia Bridge is a historic bridge, carrying Van Buren Street (County Road 66) across the Little Red River on the south side of Judsonia, Arkansas. It is a three-span metal truss swing bridge, with a total structure length of 397 feet (121 m). Built in 1924, it is one of three known swing bridges in the state, and the only one with a cantilevered swinging truss.

The bridge was listed on the National Register of Historic Places in 1990.

== Design ==
The bridge is a single-lane, three-span bridge: the north span is 79 feet (24 m) long, the south span is 49 feet (15 m) long, and the center span is 266 feet (81 m) long. All three spans are composed of Warren trusses.

The center span is mounted on a pivot on a central pier in the river, which could rotate 90 degrees to allow river traffic to pass through. The peak on top of the bridge is a structural aid to center the weight and support the ends of the center span when the bridge is open. Total clearance on either side of the opened span was 125 feet (38 m). The swing mechanism was operated by a single person through a hand crank in the floor of the center span, which would move the wheels at each end of the span along the pier to swing it open. However, after the 1920s traffic along the Little Red River decreased considerably, and the turning mechanism has been soldered shut.

== History ==
Before the bridge was built, the only ways across the river were by walking over the nearby St. Louis, Iron Mountain and Southern Railway bridge, fording the river, or using the ferry. Under local pressure from Judsonia, in 1915 the Arkansas state government passed a bill allowing for a bridge to be built over the river, and bidding began. Virginia Bridge and Iron Company was selected to build the bridge for a cost of $32,900; however, County Judge John Marsh refused to sign the contract over the objections of the county commissioners.

In 1923, after Judge Marsh had left office (and the ferry had stopped running), the county put out another call for bids. The contract was awarded to the R.L. Gaster Construction Company for a cost of $45,000. The bridge was formally completed on January 25, 1924, but the contract with Gaster did not include the approaches to the bridge on either side. Local contractor Oscar Stevens built the southern approach from donated money, and more than 100 residents of Judsonia worked together to build the northern approach with dirt from bridge commissioner J.S. Ladd.

In 2007, the Arkansas Highway Transportation Department ordered the bridge closed to traffic because of a cracked main crossbeam, likely caused during renovations in 2006. Federal funding from the Arkansas Transportation Enhancement Program was provided for restoration and repairs, and the bridge was reopened in 2013.

== See also ==
- List of bridges documented by the Historic American Engineering Record in Arkansas
- List of bridges on the National Register of Historic Places in Arkansas
- National Register of Historic Places listings in White County, Arkansas
