= Riverview High School (Arkansas) =

Location
- 810 Raider Drive; Searcy, Arkansas 72143; United States; 35°15′18″N 91°41′21″W

Information
- School type: Public comprehensive
- Status: Open
- School district: Riverview School District
- CEEB code: 041300
- NCES School ID: 050840000242
- Teaching staff: 61.72 (on FTE basis)
- Grades: 9–12
- Enrollment: 316 (2023-2024)
- Student to teacher ratio: 5.12
- Education system: ADE Smart Core
- Classes offered: Regular, Advanced Placement (AP)
- Colors: Silver, black, purple
- Athletics: Football, volleyball, bowling, golf, basketball, baseball, fastpitch softball, cheer, track
- Athletics conference: 3A Region 2 (2012–14)
- Mascot: Raider
- Team name: Riverview Raiders
- Accreditation: ADE
- Communities served: Searcy, Judsonia, Kensett
- Federal Funding: Title I
- Website: www.riverviewsd.org

Riverview High School is an accredited comprehensive public high school based in the town of Searcy, Arkansas, United States. Riverview provides secondary education for grades 9 through 12 to students in the communities of Searcy, Judsonia, Kensett and surrounding unincorporated communities of White County, Arkansas. It is the only high school of the Riverview School District.

== Academics ==
The assumed course of study follows the Smart Core curriculum developed by the ADE, which requires students complete at least 22 units prior to graduation. Students complete regular (core and elective) and career focus courses and exams and may take Advanced Placement (AP) courses and exam with the opportunity to receive college credit. The school also has the option for college classes through Arkansas State University Beebe. Riverview High School receives Title I federal funding.

Riverview High School is accredited by the Arkansas Department of Education (ADE) and accredited by AdvancED since 1995.

== Athletics ==
The Riverview High School mascot and athletic emblem is the Raider with silver, black and purple serving as the school colors.

The Riverview Raiders compete in interscholastic activities within the 3A Classification from the 3A Region 2 Conference, as administered by the Arkansas Activities Association. The Raiders field teams in football, volleyball, bowling (boys/girls), golf (boys/girls), basketball (boys/girls), soccer (boys/girls), baseball, fastpitch softball, cheer, tennis (boys/girls) and track (boys/girls). Riverview also provides students a chance to participate in the raider marching band/color guard.
