= Arkansas Highway 157 =

State highway in Arkansas, United States

Highway 157
- AR 157 highlighted in red

Route information
- Maintained by ArDOT
- Existed: 1937–present

Section 1
- Length: 36.83 mi (59.27 km)
- South end: AR 367 in Judsonia
- North end: AR 14

Section 2
- Length: 0.68 mi (1,090 m)
- North end: AR 17 in Diaz
- South end: AR 367 in Diaz

Location
- Country: United States
- State: Arkansas
- Counties: White, Independence, Jackson

Highway system
- Arkansas Highway System; Interstate; US; State; Business; Spurs; Suffixed; Scenic; Heritage
← AR 156	→ AR 158

Highway 157 (AR 157, Ark. 157, and Hwy. 157) is a designation for two state highways in Northeast Arkansas. One segment begins at Highway 367 in Judsonia and runs north to Highway 14 near Oil Trough. A second, short industrial access road also carries the Highway 157 designation in Diaz. Both routes are maintained by the Arkansas Department of Transportation (ArDOT).

One of the oldest roads through the region, the path of present-day Highway 157 was part of the original Southwest Trail in the 1820s, as was used by Brigadier General Samuel R. Curtis' Army of the Southwest during the Pea Ridge Campaign of the Civil War. Highway 157 became a state highway in 1937, and was extended over the years during periods of system expansion. The Diaz segment was created in 1976.

== Route description ==
Both segments of Highway 157 are two-lane undivided highways. No segment of Highway 157 has been listed as part of the National Highway System, a network of roads important to the nation's economy, defense, and mobility.

=== Judsonia to Oil Trough ===
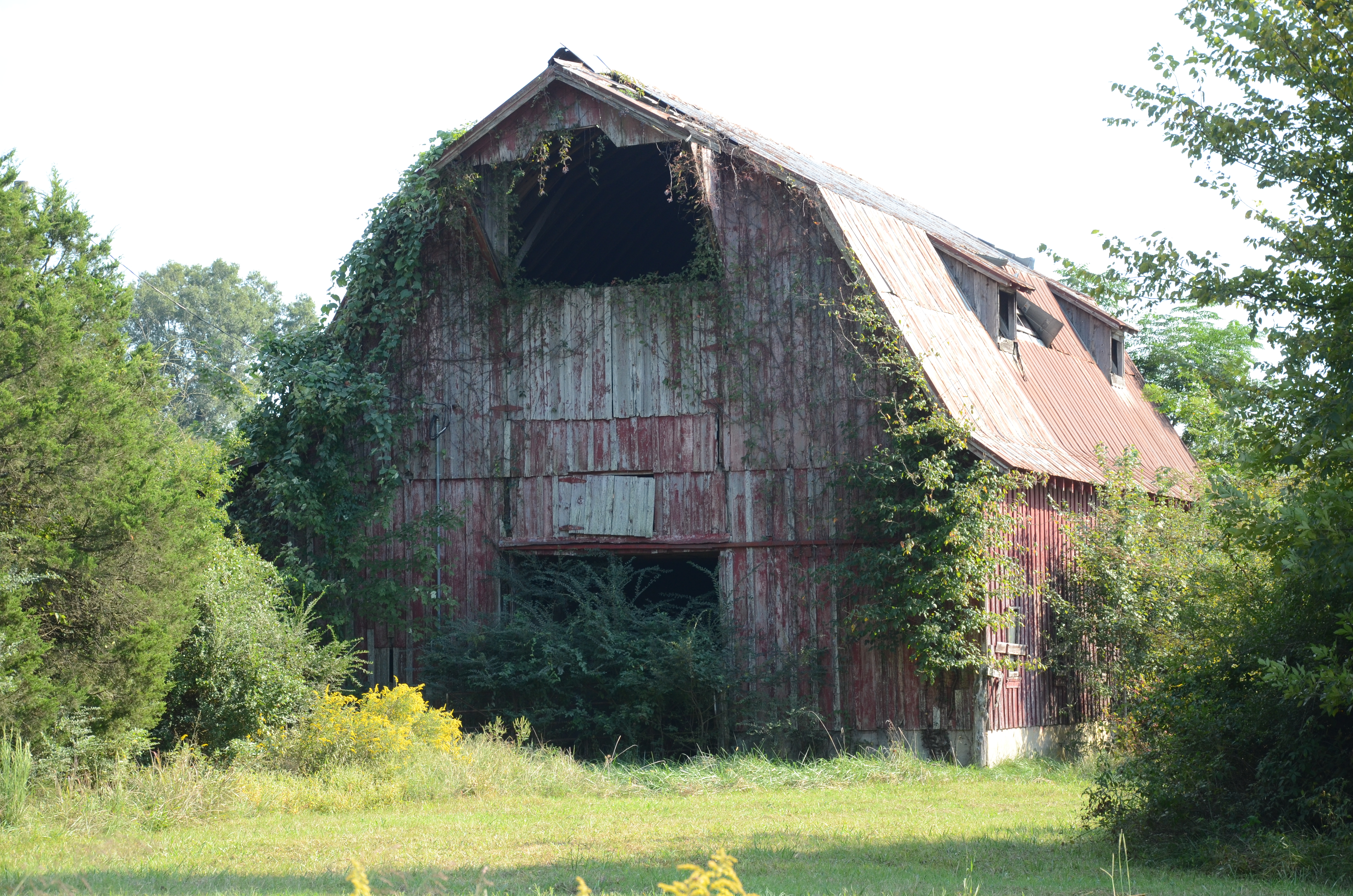
Highway 157 passes historic homestead settlements north of Judsonia. The Louis Gray Homestead Barn stood alongside Highway 157 from 1932 until it was demolished in 2016.

Highway 157 begins in Judsonia at Highway 367 on the edge of the Central Arkansas region. The highway runs north as Sunny Dale Road, exiting the city limits and passing over a full interchange with I-57/US 64/US 67/US 167. Highway 157 continues northbound through a rural agricultural area, dotted with historic farmhouses like the 1905 Capt. Larned House, Morris Hartsell Farmstead, and the Hilger Homestead, all listed on the National Register of Historic Places (NRHP). The highway becomes a section line road and junctions several minor state highways: Highway 13, Highway 385 at Plainview, and Highway 258 south of Providence. In northern White County, Highway 157 begins to wind and curve, intersecting Highway 124 at Sunnyside before entering Independence County.

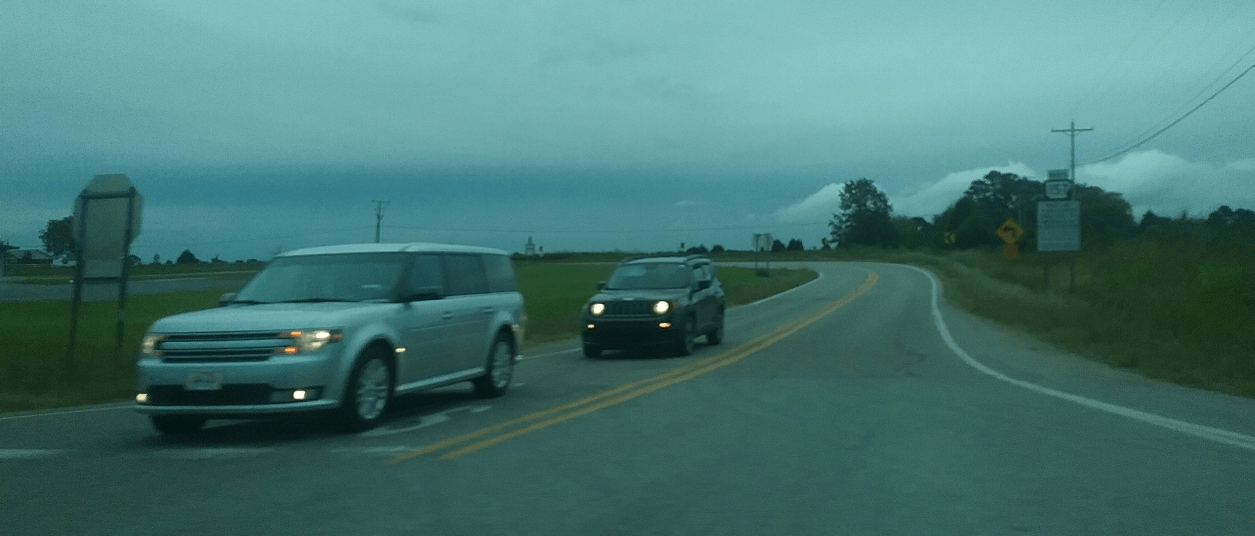
Highway 157 in Pleasant Plains, Arkansas.

Entering Pleasant Plains, a small town in southern Independence County, Highway 157 passes through downtown before an intersection with Highway 87 (Floral Road). Highway 87 continues westward to Floral, and Highway 157 turns east as Blackland Road. Highway 157 intersects US 167 along the eastern city limits of Pleasant Plains before turning northeast. The route runs becomes Blackland Road and runs towards Oil Trough, where it terminates at Highway 14.

The ArDOT maintains Highway 157 like all other parts of the state highway system. As a part of these responsibilities, the department tracks the volume of traffic using its roads in surveys using a metric called average annual daily traffic (AADT). ArDOT estimates the traffic level for a segment of roadway for any average day of the year in these surveys. For 2016, the highest traffic levels were estimated in downtown Pleasant Plains, with 7,600 vehicles per day (VPD). The highest estimated traffic outside city limits was between Fairview and Providence, with 2,600 VPD. The lowest AADT levels were the 830 VPD near the northern terminus.

=== Diaz ===
Highway 157 begins at Highway 17 (Main Street) in northern Diaz, a small town in the rural Arkansas Delta. Known as Tucker Road, the highway runs due east as a section line road through an agricultural industrial area until intersecting Highway 367, where it terminates.

As of 2016, the route had an annual average daily traffic (AADT) of 1,900 vehicles per day (VPD).

== History ==
Highway 157 first appears on the 1937 state highway map. It ran from US 67 to Providence in northern White County. It was extended north to the Independence County line in 1945, and to Highway 11 in Pleasant Plains in 1953. Following Act 9 of 1973, the highway was extended to the current northern terminus near Oil Trough. However, Act 9 of 1973 permitted a maximum of 12 miles (19 km) to be added to the state highway system per county, leaving the extension 0.47 miles (0.76 km) short of Highway 14. The gap was added to the system on February 27, 1974. Following a new alignment of US 167 in Pleasant Plains, Highway 157 was also rerouted on November 14, 2000.

The Diaz segment was created on January 29, 1976. It was realigned in 1994 at the request of the mayor of Diaz.

== Major intersections ==
County	Location	mi	km	Destinations	Notes
White	Judsonia	0.00	0.00	AR 367 – Bald Knob, Searcy	Southern terminus; former US 67
White		1.18	1.90	I-57 / US 64 / US 67 / US 167 – Plainview, Searcy, Little Rock, St. Louis	
White		3.29	5.29	AR 13	Former AR 371
White	Plainview	4.25	6.84	AR 385	AR 385 northern terminus
White		7.23	11.64	AR 258	
White	Sunnydale	14.58	23.46	AR 124 west – Pangburn	AR 124 eastern terminus
Independence	Pleasant Plains	24.79	39.90	AR 87 south (Floral Road)	Begin AR 87 overlap
Independence	Pleasant Plains	25.05	40.31	US 167 / AR 87 south – Batesville, Bald Knob	End AR 87 overlap
Independence		36.83	59.27	AR 14 – Batesville, Newport	Northern terminus
Gap in route
Jackson	Diaz	0.00	0.00	AR 17 (Main Street)	Northern terminus
Jackson	Diaz	0.68	1.09	AR 367	Southern terminus; former US 67
1.000 mi = 1.609 km; 1.000 km = 0.621 mi: Concurrency terminus

== See also ==
- List of state highways in Arkansas
