= Riverview School District (Arkansas) =

School district in Arkansas, United States

Location
- 800 Raider Drive; Searcy, Arkansas 72143 United States

District information
- Grades: PK–12
- Established: 1991
- Accreditation: AdvancED
- Schools: 4
- NCES District ID: 0508400

Students and staff
- Students: 1,360
- Teachers: 99.33 (on FTE basis)
- Student–teacher ratio: 13.69
- District mascot: Raiders
- Colors: Purple; Silver

Other information
- Website: riverviewsd.org

Riverview School District is a public school district based in Searcy, Arkansas, United States. The Riverview School District provides early childhood, elementary and secondary education for more than 1,300 pre-kindergarten through grade 12 students throughout southeast White County at its campuses in eastern Searcy, Kensett, Judsonia; it serves a far eastern portion of Searcy and almost all of Judsonia. It also serves Griffithville.

Riverview School District is accredited by the Arkansas Department of Education (ADE) with the high school and junior high accredited by AdvancED since 1995.

== History ==
The district is the result of a consolidation, effective July 1, 1991, of the Judsonia, Kensett, and Griffithville school districts. The Judsonia district included small eastern portion of Searcy.

== Schools ==
- Riverview High School—serving grades 9 through 12 in Searcy.
- Riverview Junior High School—serving grades 7 and 8 in Searcy.
- Kensett Elementary School—grades pre-kindergarten through grade 6 in Kensett.
- Judsonia Elementary School—serving kindergarten through grade 6 in Judsonia.

Previously the Kensett Middle School was in Kensett.
