= Griffithville, Arkansas =

- Town
- Location of Griffithville in White County, Arkansas.
- Coordinates: 35°07′28″N 91°38′44″W
- Country: United States
- State: Arkansas
- County: White

Area
  - Total: 0.55 sq mi (1.42 km^{2})
  - Land: 0.55 sq mi (1.42 km^{2})
  - Water: 0 sq mi (0.00 km^{2})
- Elevation: 213 ft (65 m)

Population (2020)
  - Total: 155
  - Estimate (2025): 159 ▲
  - Density: 282.9/sq mi (109.21/km^{2})
- Time zone: UTC-6 (Central (CST))
  - Summer (DST): UTC-5 (CDT)
- ZIP code: 72060
- Area code: 501
- FIPS code: 05-28990
- GNIS feature ID: 2406619

Griffithville is a town in White County, Arkansas, United States. As of the 2020 census, Griffithville had a population of 155.

Windle Porter is the current mayor of the town.

== Geography ==
According to the United States Census Bureau, the town has a total area of 1.0 km^{2} (0.39 sq mi), all land.

== Demographics ==
Historical population
Census	Pop.	Note	%±
1910	202		—
1920	219		8.4%
1930	238		8.7%
1940	244		2.5%
1950	207		−15.2%
1960	172		−16.9%
1970	227		32.0%
1980	254		11.9%
1990	237		−6.7%
2000	262		10.5%
2010	225		−14.1%
2020	155		−31.1%
2025 (est.)	159	▲	2.6%
U.S. Decennial Census

As of the census of 2000, there were 262 people, 105 households, and 76 families residing in the town. The population density was 259.4 people /km^{2} (672 people/mi^{2}). There were 119 housing units at an average density of 117.8 units /km^{2} (305 units/mi^{2}). The racial makeup of the town was 97.71% White, 1.91% from other races, and 0.38% from two or more races. 5.34% of the population were Hispanic or Latino of any race.

There were 105 households, out of which 35.2% had children under the age of 18 living with them, 65.7% were married couples living together, 5.7% had a female householder with no husband present, and 26.7% were non-families. 26.7% of all households were made up of individuals, and 19.0% had someone living alone who was 65 years of age or older. The average household size was 2.50 and the average family size was 3.04.

In the town, the population was spread out, with 26.3% under the age of 18, 11.8% from 18 to 24, 22.1% from 25 to 44, 20.6% from 45 to 64, and 19.1% who were 65 years of age or older. The median age was 35 years. For every 100 females, there were 104.7 males. For every 100 females age 18 and over, there were 93.0 males.

The median income for a household in the town was $25,000, and the median income for a family was $35,625. Males had a median income of $27,250 versus $22,500 for females. The per capita income for the town was $13,082. About 11.6% of families and 11.6% of the population were below the poverty line, including 11.1% of those under the age of eighteen and 7.7% of those sixty-five or over.

== Education ==
Public education for early childhood, elementary and secondary school students is provided from the Riverview School District, which leads to graduation from Riverview High School. Riverview district is the result of a consolidation, effective July 1, 1991, of the Judsonia, Kensett, and Griffithville school districts.
