= Searcy, Arkansas =

- City
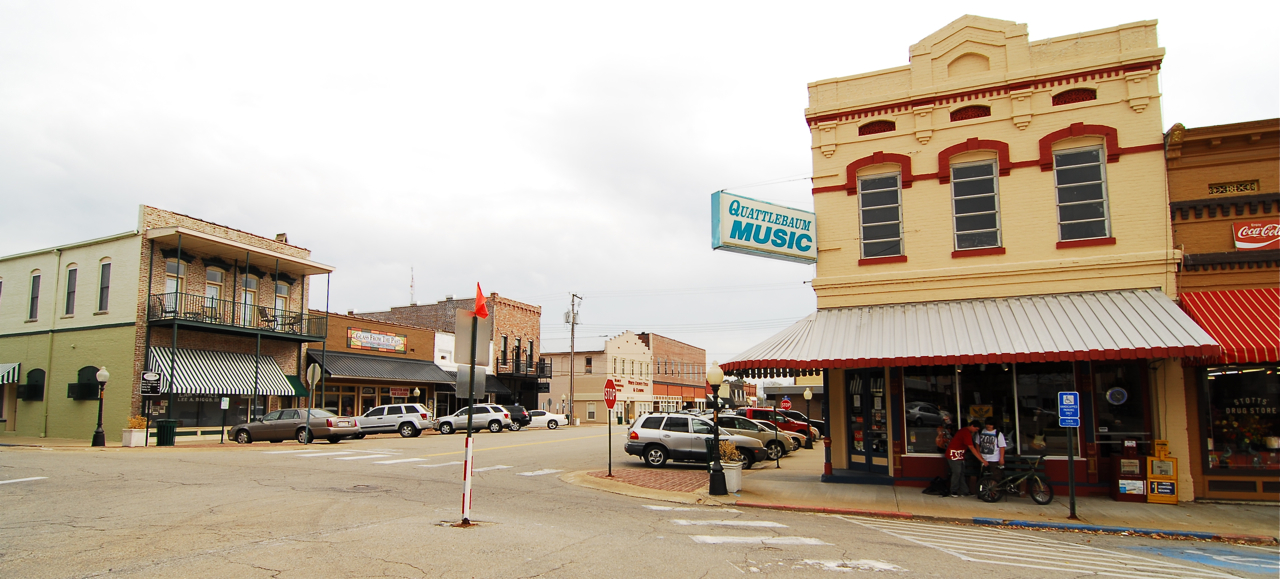
- Part of historic downtown Searcy

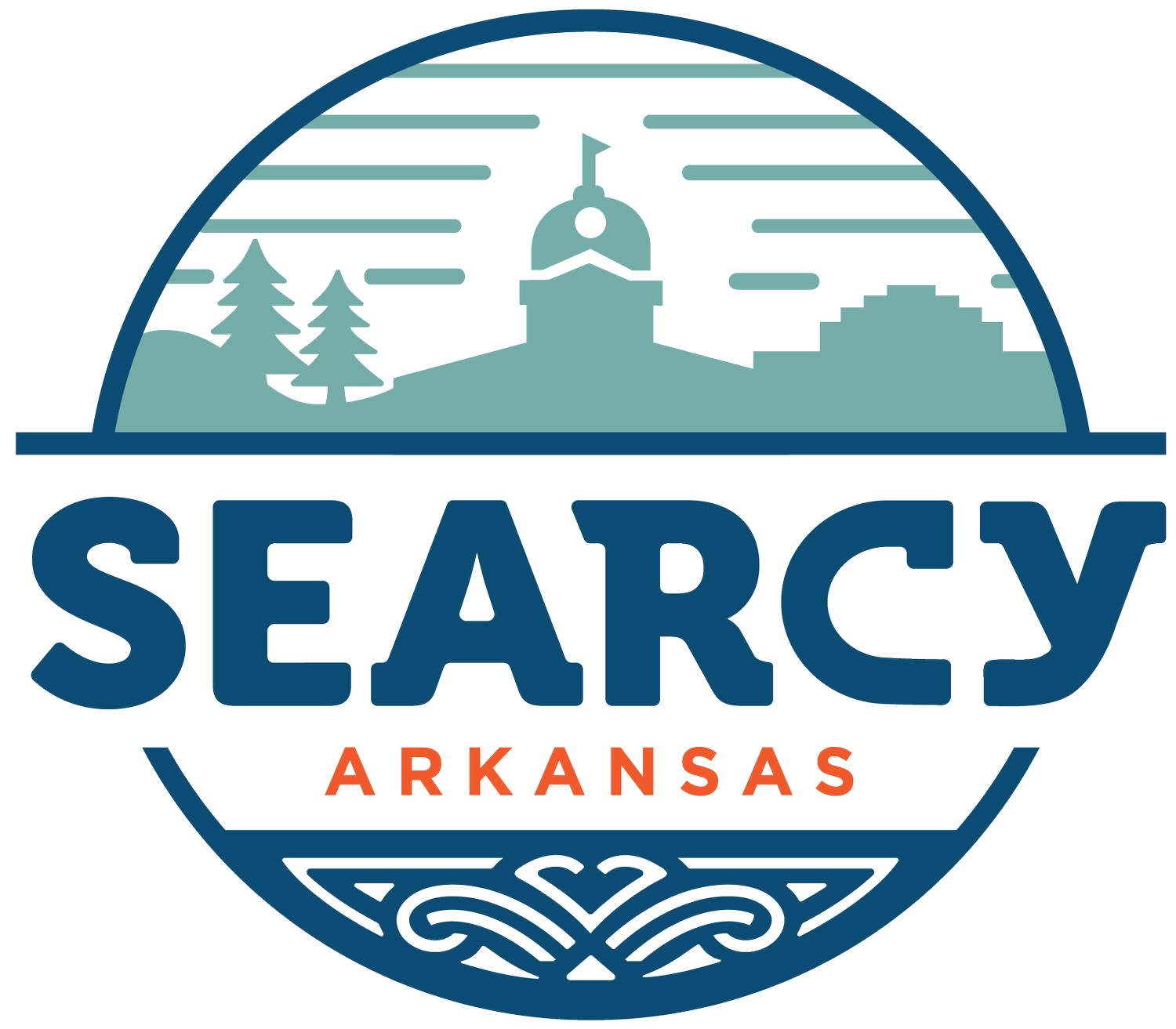
- Logo
- Motto: Pride – Progress – Potential "The city where thousands live as millions wish they could."
- Location of Searcy in White County, Arkansas.
- Coordinates: 35°14′49″N 91°44′01″W
- Country: United States
- State: Arkansas
- County: White
- Founded: 1838
- Incorporated: 1851

Government
  - Mayor: Mat Faulkner

Area
  - Total: 18.41 sq mi (47.69 km^{2})
  - Land: 18.32 sq mi (47.44 km^{2})
  - Water: 0.097 sq mi (0.25 km^{2})
- Elevation: 245 ft (75 m)

Population (2020)
  - Total: 22,937
  - Estimate (2025): 24,351 ▲
  - Density: 1,252/sq mi (483.5/km^{2})
- Time zone: UTC-6 (CST)
  - Summer (DST): UTC-5 (CDT)
- ZIP codes: 72143, 72145, 72149
- Area code: 501
- FIPS code: 05-63020
- GNIS feature ID: 2405437
- Website: www.cityofsearcy.org

Searcy (/ˈsɜːrsi/ SUR-see) is the largest city in and the county seat of White County, Arkansas, United States. According to 2024 Census Bureau estimates, the population of the city is 23,997. It is the principal city of the Searcy, AR Micropolitan Statistical Area which encompasses all of White County. The city takes its name from Richard Searcy, a judge for the Superior Court of the Arkansas Territory. A college town, Searcy is the home of Harding University and ASU-Searcy.

== History ==
Originally named White Sulphur Springs, the town's name was changed in 1837, two years after White County was created. The state changed the county seat name to honor Richard Searcy (1794–1832), a prominent Arkansas Legislator.

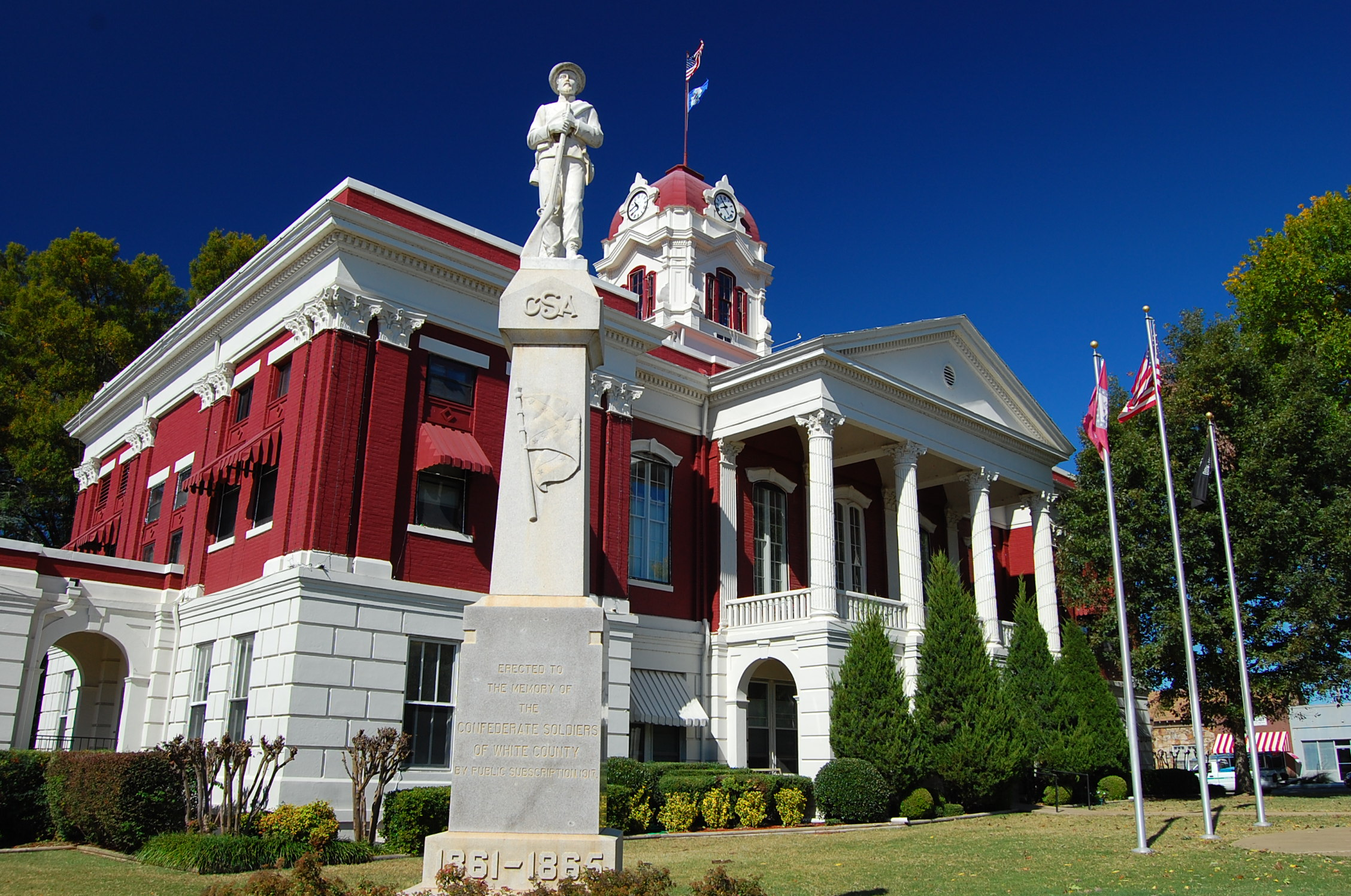
White County Courthouse in Searcy

The town contained a health spa from its inception until 1820, when the alum, chalybeate, and white sulphur springs for which the spa was known dried up.

Israel Moore, who had traveled west from Philadelphia, was in charge of laying out Searcy's original streets, and "he proceeded to name the major streets of Searcy for those of downtown Old Philadelphia near Independence Hall; Race, Arch, Market, Vine, Spring, and the tree-honoring streets of Cherry, Spruce, Locust and Pine." In 1957, Searcy named Moore Street after the 19th-century founder.

Spring Street also has a namesake in Old City Philadelphia, but along with downtown Searcy's Spring Park, this refers to the early history of the Searcy area, when the community was known as White Sulphur Springs. As early as 1834, local springs with purported therapeutic properties initially drew visitors to the area, similar to the popular attraction to Hot Springs.

During the American Civil War, the Battle of Whitney's Lane was fought near Searcy, although the exact site is disputed. Searcy Landing, on the Little Red River, is the final resting place for some Union Army soldiers.

Searcy was incorporated on August 6, 1851.

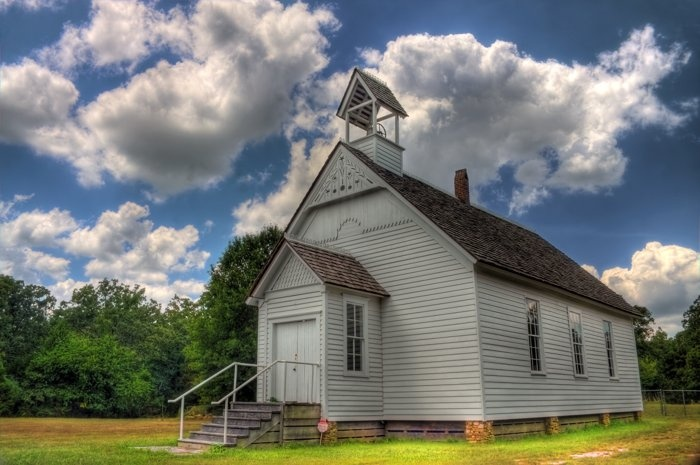
Smyrna Methodist Church near Searcy

The Smyrna Methodist Church located just to the west of Searcy is the oldest known church building still standing in the state. It was built in 1856 according to research done by David Stahle of the University of Arkansas Tree Ring Laboratory.

Searcy is also home to the oldest operational courthouse in the state, the White County Courthouse. Originally the home of the first permanent resident, David Crise, the courthouse was completed in 1837. After being replaced two times, the last rendition was built in 1871. The most recent courthouse has a clocktower with a model of the Liberty Bell dating from 1855.

Searcy was a stop on the defunct Missouri and North Arkansas Railroad, which provided passenger and freight service from 1906 to 1946 from Joplin, Missouri, to Helena in Phillips County in eastern Arkansas.

On August 9, 1965, a fire killed 53 civilian workers in a Titan II missile silo north of Searcy. It was one of the largest industrial accidents in American history.

Despite having lost many factory jobs in the late 20th century, Searcy experienced a brief economic revitalization in the past decade from the leasing of mineral rights to natural gas companies. Almost all drilling in the Fayetteville Shale area has since ceased. Some residents express concern about the deleterious environmental effect of the extensive drilling projects that have taken place.

In 2019, the city of Searcy was the winner of the "Small Business Revolution on Main Street" award of $500,000 to revamp six small businesses and a season featuring these renovations on the Hulu show hosted by Amanda Brinkman.

== Geography ==
According to the United States Census Bureau, the city has a total area of 14.8 square miles (38 km^{2}), of which 14.7 square miles (38 km^{2}) is land and 0.1 square miles (0.26 km^{2}) (0.54%) is water.

=== Climate ===
The climate in this area is characterized by hot, humid summers and generally mild to cool winters. According to the Köppen Climate Classification system, Searcy has a humid subtropical climate, abbreviated "Cfa" on climate maps.

Climate data for Searcy, Arkansas (1991–2020 normals, extremes 1892–1895, 1915–present)
Month	Jan	Feb	Mar	Apr	May	Jun	Jul	Aug	Sep	Oct	Nov	Dec	Year
Record high °F (°C)	87 (31)	86 (30)	91 (33)	97 (36)	99 (37)	109 (43)	112 (44)	115 (46)	111 (44)	100 (38)	87 (31)	81 (27)	115 (46)
Mean maximum °F (°C)	68.8 (20.4)	74.1 (23.4)	80.8 (27.1)	86.3 (30.2)	91.8 (33.2)	97.1 (36.2)	100.8 (38.2)	100.9 (38.3)	96.0 (35.6)	88.0 (31.1)	77.7 (25.4)	69.9 (21.1)	102.4 (39.1)
Mean daily maximum °F (°C)	49.1 (9.5)	54.1 (12.3)	63.0 (17.2)	73.0 (22.8)	81.6 (27.6)	89.6 (32.0)	93.0 (33.9)	92.1 (33.4)	85.4 (29.7)	73.8 (23.2)	61.3 (16.3)	51.6 (10.9)	72.3 (22.4)
Daily mean °F (°C)	39.6 (4.2)	43.6 (6.4)	52.3 (11.3)	61.7 (16.5)	71.1 (21.7)	79.4 (26.3)	82.8 (28.2)	81.5 (27.5)	74.2 (23.4)	62.2 (16.8)	50.8 (10.4)	42.3 (5.7)	61.8 (16.6)
Mean daily minimum °F (°C)	30.0 (−1.1)	33.2 (0.7)	41.5 (5.3)	50.4 (10.2)	60.6 (15.9)	69.3 (20.7)	72.6 (22.6)	70.9 (21.6)	63.0 (17.2)	50.7 (10.4)	40.3 (4.6)	33.0 (0.6)	51.3 (10.7)
Mean minimum °F (°C)	13.3 (−10.4)	17.3 (−8.2)	22.9 (−5.1)	33.2 (0.7)	44.6 (7.0)	57.3 (14.1)	63.1 (17.3)	60.1 (15.6)	46.9 (8.3)	33.7 (0.9)	23.1 (−4.9)	17.8 (−7.9)	10.8 (−11.8)
Record low °F (°C)	−20 (−29)	−10 (−23)	9 (−13)	24 (−4)	34 (1)	44 (7)	51 (11)	46 (8)	31 (−1)	22 (−6)	11 (−12)	−4 (−20)	−20 (−29)
Average precipitation inches (mm)	3.58 (91)	3.90 (99)	5.07 (129)	5.42 (138)	5.93 (151)	3.02 (77)	3.87 (98)	3.41 (87)	3.83 (97)	4.13 (105)	4.77 (121)	4.91 (125)	51.84 (1,317)
Average snowfall inches (cm)	0.7 (1.8)	0.6 (1.5)	0.4 (1.0)	0.0 (0.0)	0.0 (0.0)	0.0 (0.0)	0.0 (0.0)	0.0 (0.0)	0.0 (0.0)	0.0 (0.0)	0.0 (0.0)	0.1 (0.25)	1.8 (4.6)
Average precipitation days (≥ 0.01 in)	9.1	7.9	10.1	9.5	9.6	7.1	7.9	6.9	6.3	7.8	8.5	9.3	100.0
Average snowy days (≥ 0.1 in)	0.4	0.4	0.3	0.0	0.0	0.0	0.0	0.0	0.0	0.0	0.1	0.2	1.4
Source: NOAA

== Demographics ==
Historical population
Census	Pop.	Note	%±
1860	621		—
1870	874		40.7%
1880	840		−3.9%
1890	1,203		43.2%
1900	1,995		65.8%
1910	2,331		16.8%
1920	2,836		21.7%
1930	3,387		19.4%
1940	3,670		8.4%
1950	6,024		64.1%
1960	7,272		20.7%
1970	9,040		24.3%
1980	13,612		50.6%
1990	15,180		11.5%
2000	18,928		24.7%
2010	22,858		20.8%
2020	22,937		0.3%
2025 (est.)	24,351	▲	6.2%
U.S. Decennial Census

=== 2020 census ===
As of the 2020 census, Searcy had a population of 22,937. There were 8,910 households and 4,810 families residing in the city.

The median age was 32.9 years. 21.8% of residents were under the age of 18 and 17.2% of residents were 65 years of age or older. For every 100 females there were 87.5 males, and for every 100 females age 18 and over there were 83.0 males age 18 and over.

There were 8,910 households in Searcy, of which 28.8% had children under the age of 18 living in them. Of all households, 43.5% were married-couple households, 18.1% were households with a male householder and no spouse or partner present, and 33.1% were households with a female householder and no spouse or partner present. About 32.7% of all households were made up of individuals and 13.5% had someone living alone who was 65 years of age or older.

There were 9,981 housing units, of which 10.7% were vacant. The homeowner vacancy rate was 2.2% and the rental vacancy rate was 10.6%.

99.6% of residents lived in urban areas, while 0.4% lived in rural areas.

Racial composition as of the 2020 census
Race	Number	Percent
White	17,755	77.4%
Black or African American	2,460	10.7%
American Indian and Alaska Native	91	0.4%
Asian	402	1.8%
Native Hawaiian and Other Pacific Islander	13	0.1%
Some other race	648	2.8%
Two or more races	1,568	6.8%
Hispanic or Latino (of any race)	1,247	5.4%

== Government ==
The current mayor of Searcy is Mat Faulkner, elected in 2022.

The current City Council consists of 2 members per ward. Brett Kirkman (Ward 1, position 1), David Morris (Ward 1, position 2), Chris Howell (Ward 2, position 1), Rodger Cargile (Ward 2, position 2), Tonia Hale (Ward 3, position 1), Donald Raney (Ward 3, position 2), Dale Brewer (Ward 4, position 1), and Mike Chalenburg (Ward 4, position 2).

The city delegates certain powers to boards and commissions. They are as follows: The Searcy Airport Commission, The Searcy Public Educational and Residential Housing Facilities Board, The Searcy Housing Authority Board, The Searcy Board of Public Utilities, The Searcy Library Board, The Searcy Tree Board, The Searcy Parks & Recreation Advisory Board, and The Searcy Advertising & Promotion Commission.

== Economy ==
One of the state's largest banks, First Security Bank, was established in downtown Searcy in 1932 as Security Bank.

In July 1978, Walmart opened its first distribution center (outside of Bentonville) in eastern Searcy. The facility is still open as a Sam's Club distribution center, while an additional larger facility has since opened in southern Searcy to service Walmart stores. The company has also operated a retail location in eastern Searcy (near the city's original distribution center) since the 1970s.

Searcy is home to one of the largest healthcare providers in the state, Unity Health. Unity Health is the largest employer in the city at 2,376

Bryce Corporation operates a flexible packaging factory in Searcy. This 350,000 square foot complex opened in 1976.

At the end of 2006, the Maytag factory shut down, and Kohler's Searcy plant ceased operation in 2009. Many companies associated with natural gas that supported the brief natural gas boom also left the city in the late 2000s, hurting the local economy. According to the online real estate database Redfin, the median sell price of a home in 2025 is $234,650, up from $135,000 in 2020. While, according to Zillow, rent was an average of $885 in 2026.

Sales tax for purchases in Searcy is higher than the state average, at 9.75%.

== Education ==
=== Public schools ===
Searcy is served by two public school districts. Searcy Public Schools — including Searcy High School, three elementary schools and middle and junior high campuses — serve all but the far eastern portion of the city. That portion of the city is within the Riverview School District, which operates Riverview High School. The Riverview district is the result of a consolidation, effective July 1, 1991, of the Judsonia, Kensett, and Griffithville school districts. Previously, the Riverview portion of Searcy was part of the Kensett school district; Riverview High School was built in eastern Searcy following the consolidation.

Searcy Public Schools campuses include:

- Searcy High School
- Ahlf Junior High School
- Southwest Middle School
- McRae Elementary
- Sidney Deener Elementary
- Westside Elementary

Riverview High School and Riverview Junior High School are in Searcy, while the Riverview School District is served by two elementary schools outside of the city limits.

=== Private schools ===
- Harding Academy is a K-12 college preparatory school enrolling more than 600 students. Harding University oversees the school, which resides adjacent to the university campus.
- Searcy Christian Academy (PK – 6)
- CrossPointe Preparatory, a school affiliated with the National Association of University-Model Schools, opened in 2009.
- Sunshine School

=== Colleges and universities ===
- Harding University, a private, Christian university affiliated with the Churches of Christ founded in 1924, has its main campus in Searcy. Harding moved to Searcy in 1934 from Morrilton. The university has developed and expanded to include 49 buildings on more than 350 acres (1.4 km^{2}). With more than 6,100 students, Harding University is the largest private university in Arkansas.
- A campus of Arkansas State University is located in Searcy. Formerly operating as Foothills Technical Institute, it is a technical campus of nearby Arkansas State University Beebe, and offers several two-year programs. In order to create drilling jobs for local populace, the Searcy campus has partnered in training with the natural gas industry that is developing local natural resources.

== Notable people ==
- Barrett Adair, political content creator
- Mike Beebe, former governor of Arkansas
- Ed Bethune, former U.S. representative, 1979–1985
- George W. Bond, educator
- Stephen Mark Brown, opera singer
- John Paul Capps, politician
- Weston Dacus, NFL linebacker
- Beth Ditto, lead singer for Gossip (band)
- Jacob Frolich, Secretary of State of Arkansas
- Les Eaves, state representative for White County since 2015
- James Hannah, chief justice of Arkansas Supreme Court
- Eugene Lambert, basketball and football coach
- Bryce Mitchell, mixed martial artist in the UFC
