= Providence, Arkansas =

- Unincorporated community
- Location within Arkansas Location within the United States
- Coordinates: 35°22′13″N 91°40′34″W
- Country: United States
- State: Arkansas
- County: White
- Elevation: 509 ft (155 m)
- Time zone: UTC-6 (Central (CST))
  - Summer (DST): UTC-5 (CDT)
- Area code: 501
- GNIS feature ID: 58440

Providence is an unincorporated community in White County, Arkansas, United States.

Providence is the nearest populated place to J.C. Rhew Co. Packing Shed, which is listed on the U.S. National Register of Historic Places.
