= Judsonia, Arkansas =

- City
- Location of Judsonia in White County, Arkansas.
- Coordinates: 35°16′53″N 91°37′57″W
- Country: United States
- State: Arkansas
- County: White

Area
  - Total: 2.90 sq mi (7.52 km^{2})
  - Land: 2.89 sq mi (7.48 km^{2})
  - Water: 0.015 sq mi (0.04 km^{2})
- Elevation: 213 ft (65 m)

Population (2020)
  - Total: 1,854
  - Estimate (2025): 1,906 ▲
  - Density: 642.2/sq mi (247.95/km^{2})
- Time zone: UTC-6 (Central (CST))
  - Summer (DST): UTC-5 (CDT)
- ZIP code: 72081
- Area code: 501
- FIPS code: 05-36040
- GNIS feature ID: 2404813

Judsonia is a city in White County, Arkansas, United States. Stan Robinson is the current mayor, first elected in 2018. The population was 1,854 at the 2020 census. The city is located immediately northeast of neighboring Searcy, and north of the Little Red River before it turns southeast toward the White River.

== Geography ==
According to the United States Census Bureau, the city has a total area of 3.0 square miles (7.8 km^{2}), of which 3.0 square miles (7.8 km^{2}) is land and 0.04 square miles (0.10 km^{2}) (1.31%) is water.

== Demographics ==
Historical population
| Census | Pop. | Note | %± |
|---|---|---|---|
| 1880 | 267 | | — |
| 1890 | 475 | | 77.9% |
| 1900 | 600 | | 26.3% |
| 1910 | 746 | | 24.3% |
| 1920 | 899 | | 20.5% |
| 1930 | 1,123 | | 24.9% |
| 1940 | 1,011 | | −10.0% |
| 1950 | 1,122 | | 11.0% |
| 1960 | 977 | | −12.9% |
| 1970 | 1,667 | | 70.6% |
| 1980 | 2,025 | | 21.5% |
| 1990 | 1,915 | | −5.4% |
| 2000 | 1,982 | | 3.5% |
| 2010 | 2,019 | | 1.9% |
| 2020 | 1,854 | | −8.2% |
| 2025 (est.) | 1,906 | ▲ | 2.8% |
U.S. Decennial Census

=== 2020 census ===
Judsonia racial composition
| Race | Number | Percentage |
|---|---|---|
| White (non-Hispanic) | 1,627 | 87.76% |
| Black or African American (non-Hispanic) | 27 | 1.46% |
| Native American | 8 | 0.43% |
| Asian | 4 | 0.22% |
| Other/Mixed | 105 | 5.66% |
| Hispanic or Latino | 83 | 4.48% |

As of the 2020 census, Judsonia had a population of 1,854. The median age was 41.0 years. 22.7% of residents were under the age of 18 and 22.2% of residents were 65 years of age or older. For every 100 females there were 92.5 males, and for every 100 females age 18 and over there were 87.8 males age 18 and over.

77.5% of residents lived in urban areas, while 22.5% lived in rural areas.

There were 714 households in Judsonia, of which 29.7% had children under the age of 18 living in them. Of all households, 44.3% were married-couple households, 19.7% were households with a male householder and no spouse or partner present, and 29.6% were households with a female householder and no spouse or partner present. About 29.1% of all households were made up of individuals and 17.0% had someone living alone who was 65 years of age or older. There were 468 families residing in the city.

There were 837 housing units, of which 14.7% were vacant. The homeowner vacancy rate was 4.2% and the rental vacancy rate was 10.5%.

=== 2000 census ===
At the 2000 census, there were 1,982 people, 733 households and 529 families residing in the city. The population density was 659.5 per square mile (254.6/km^{2}). There were 816 housing units at an average density of 271.5 per square mile (104.8/km^{2}). The racial makeup was 94.05% White, 2.32% Black or African American, 0.71% Native American, 0.10% Asian, 0.05% Pacific Islander, 1.31% from other races, and 1.46% from two or more races. 2.32% of the population were Hispanic or Latino of any race.

There were 733 households, of which 29.9% had children under the age of 18 living with them, 56.8% were married couples living together, 10.9% had a female householder with no husband present, and 27.7% were non-families. 25.2% of all households were made up of individuals, and 12.7% had someone living alone who was 65 years of age or older. The average household size was 2.48 and the average family size was 2.94.

22.5% of the population were under the age of 18, 7.7% from 18 to 24, 24.9% from 25 to 44, 22.4% from 45 to 64, and 22.6% who were 65 years of age or older. The median age was 40 years. For every 100 females, there were 85.2 males. For every 100 females age 18 and over, there were 80.5 males.

The median household income was $25,660 and the median family income was $31,176. Males had a median income of $25,774 and females $16,852. The per capita income was $11,891. About 12.0% of families and 15.7% of the population were below the poverty line, including 18.4% of those under age 18 and 20.8% of those age 65 or over.

== History ==
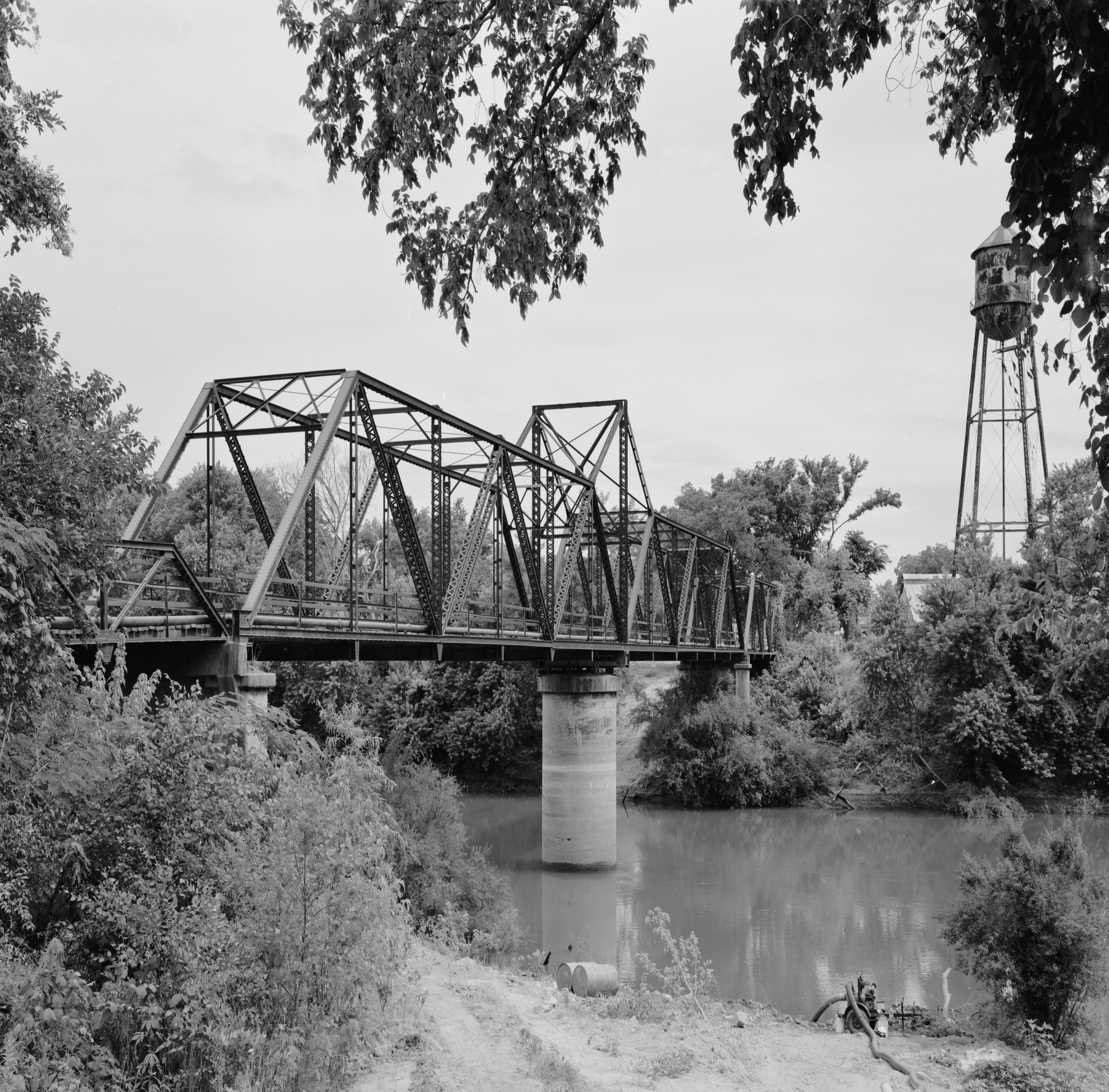
The Judsonia Bridge over Little Red River is listed on the National Register of Historic Places

Originally known as Prospect Bluff, the town was founded in 1840 by Erastus Gregory. In 1871, a Baptist school, Judson University, was established in the area. A few months later, the name Prospect Bluff was changed to Judsonia, after the Baptist missionary Adoniram Judson, to help promote the school, which drew many northerners to the area.

Though the school closed in 1883, the town streets still bear the names of several well-known 19th-century Baptists: Judson and Hasseltine (after Adoniram Judson and his wife, Ann Hasseltine Judson), Wayland (after Francis Wayland, president of Brown University in Rhode Island), Wade (after the missionary Jonathan Wade) and Boardman (after the missionary George Boardman, whose widow, Sarah Hall Boardman became Judson's second wife).

On the evening of March 21, 1952, tornadoes swept Arkansas, leaving 111 dead. Fifty of those fatalities were in Judsonia and the near vicinity. It was reported that the only building in the town not damaged was the Methodist church, which is in the city's downtown area along Van Buren Street.

That's Judsonia by William Ewing Orr (1957, White County Printing Company) is a history of the community. Judsonia has a yearly festival called Prospect Bluff Days in honor of the town's origins.

== Education ==
Elementary and secondary education is provided by two school districts:

- Most of the city is within the Riverview School District, including Riverview Junior High School and Riverview High School in Searcy. Judsonia Elementary School is a part of this district. The Riverview district is the result of a consolidation, effective from July 1, 1991, of the Judsonia, Kensett and Griffithville school districts.
- A small section of the city is within the White County Central School District, where students attend White County Central High School; Both are located in a nearby unincorporated area near the Providence community.

Judsonia residents are served by Baldwin-Kittler Memorial Library, a branch library of the White County Regional Library System.

== Notable people ==
- Beth Ditto, musician who grew up in Judsonia
- Jeremy Gillam, farmer from Judsonia and Republican member of the Arkansas House of Representatives
- Lonnie Glosson, an early blues harmonica player
