= David Cook (Arkansas politician) =

American politician (born 1950)

Member of the Arkansas House of Representatives from the 80th district
- In office January 10, 2005 – January 10, 2011
- Preceded by: Harmon Seawel
- Succeeded by: Linda Collins-Smith

Personal details
- Born: David Ray Cook; January 24, 1950 (age 76) Arkansas, U.S.
- Party: Democratic
- Education: University of Central Arkansas (BSE); Pepperdine University (MS); University of Arkansas (EdS)

Military service
- Branch/service: United States Navy
- Years of service: 1972–1978
- Battles/wars: Vietnam War

David Ray Cook (born January 24, 1950) is an American educator and politician who served three terms in the Arkansas House of Representatives. A Vietnam veteran, former public school administrator, and member of the Democratic Party, he was first elected to the House in 2004. In 2010, he sought the Democratic congressional nomination in Arkansas's 1st district, ultimately placing third in a crowded primary.

In 2014, after his legislative service, he was named director of the Arkansas Leadership Academy at the University of Arkansas.

== Early life and education ==
Cook was born as one of six siblings at the home of his parents in rural Arkansas. He was the first member of his family to graduate from high school. He was admitted to the University of Central Arkansas on a track and field scholarship and studied special education and physical education. After graduation, he served six years in the Navy during the Vietnam War, where he worked on cryptography.

Following his discharge from the Navy, Cook earned a master's degree in human resource management from Pepperdine University and an educational specialist degree from the University of Arkansas. Over 30 years, he worked as a teacher, coach, principal, assistant superintendent and superintendent in the Sheridan, Bradford, McRae, Bald Knob, Sloan-Hendrix, Osceola, and Hoxie school districts. From 1990 to 2002, he also worked with his brother-in-law, managing a shoe-last factory in Hoxie.

== Politics ==
=== State house service ===
In 2004, Cook ran in the Democratic primary to succeed retiring House majority leader Harmon Seawel. After winning the primary and runoff, he faced Republican Rodney Harris and Independent R. Garry Palmer in the general election and was elected with 61.5% of the vote. He was reelected without opposition in 2006 and 2008.

By 2010, Cook had been named chair of the House Education subcommittees on K-12 education and Veterans.

=== 2010 congressional run ===
In 2010, Cook opted to seek election to the U.S. House of Representatives from Arkansas's 1st congressional district, after incumbent Robert Marion Berry announced his retirement. He placed third in the Democratic primary behind former state senator Tim Wooldridge and Berry's chief of staff, Chad Causey, the eventual nominee. Causey would go on to lose in November to Republican Rick Crawford. Cook was succeeded in the state house by fellow Democrat Linda Collins-Smith, who switched parties seven months into her term.

== Later life ==
Cook was named director of the Arkansas Leadership Academy, a unit of the College of Education and Health Professions at the University of Arkansas, in 2014. A training consortium for state educators, the academy was created by the Arkansas General Assembly in 1991.

Arkansas House of Representatives
| Preceded by Harmon Seawel | Arkansas State Representative from the 80th District; 2005–2011 | Succeeded by Linda Collins-Smith |
