= Joseph Bradford =

Joseph Bradford may refer to:

- Joseph Bradford (playwright) (1843–1886), American playwright
- Joseph Bradford (preacher) (c. 1748–1808), British preacher, companion of John Wesley
- Joseph H. Bradford (c. 1854–?), American teacher, lawyer, and state legislator in Arkansas
- Joe Bradford (1901–1980), English footballer
- Joseph Bradford, winner of the 1978 U.S. Open Chess Championship
