= Senator Critcher =

Senator Critcher may refer to:

- Jack Critcher (fl. 1990s–2000s), Arkansas State Senate
- John Critcher (1820–1901), Virginia State Senate
