= Osceola School District =

Osceola School District may refer to:

- Osceola School District (Arkansas), based in Osceola, Arkansas
- Osceola School District (Missouri), based in Osceola, Missouri
- Osceola School District (Wisconsin), based in Osceola, Wisconsin
- Osceola Public Schools, based in Osceola, Nebraska
- School District of Osceola County, Florida, based in Osceola County, Florida
- Mecosta–Osceola Intermediate School District, based in Big Rapids, Michigan
- Philipsburg-Osceola Area School District, based in Pennsylvania
