= Linda Collins =

American politician and businesswoman (1962–2019)

Member of the Arkansas Senate from the 19th district
- In office January 12, 2015 – January 14, 2019
- Preceded by: David Wyatt
- Succeeded by: James Sturch

Member of the Arkansas House of Representatives from the 80th district
- In office January 10, 2011 – January 14, 2013
- Preceded by: David Cook
- Succeeded by: Charlene Fite

Personal details
- Born: April 17, 1962 Pocahontas, Arkansas, U.S.
- Died: May 28, 2019 (aged 57) Pocahontas, Arkansas, U.S.
- Party: Republican (2011–2019)
- Other political affiliations: Democratic (until 2011)
- Spouse: Philip Smith (div. 2018)
- Children: 2
- Profession: Hotelier

Linda F. Collins (April 17, 1962 – May 28, 2019; known as Linda Collins-Smith until her divorce) was an American businesswoman and politician who served a single term from 2015 to 2019 as a Republican member of the Arkansas Senate.

On June 4, 2019, she was found stabbed to death. Rebecca Lynn O'Donnell, a former campaign worker, was convicted of the murder.

== Early life and career ==
Collins was born in Pocahontas, Arkansas, and was native to the area. However, she was educated in Williford, Arkansas. Her family was very poor, living 10 miles down a gravel road, in a home that didn't have running water until her teen years. According to her campaign website "her background taught her the value of hard work, and the blessing of living in a land where everyone, from the poor country girl to the inner city street kid, had the opportunity to achieve their dreams through industry and determination."

Since at least 2001, Collins owned and operated the Days Inn in Pocahontas, which was sold in 2016. Before owning Days Inn she was a real estate agent.

== Political career ==
=== Affiliation ===
According to her obituary:

"[S]he was a lifetime member of the National Rifle Association. She was a member of the following organizations: Gun Owners of America, Arkansas Hospitality Association, National Federation of Independent Business, Arkansas Chamber of Commerce, Randolph County Arkansas Chamber of Commerce, Rotary Club, Arkansas Lodging Association, Lower Mississippi Delta Development Council, and the Arkansas Federation of Republican Women. Linda was also proud to be the founder of the Randolph County Tourism Association and a supporter of the Patriots of Act 746, in Arkansas."

=== House of Representatives ===
Prior to her Senate service, Collins was a one-term member from 2011 to 2013 of the Arkansas House of Representatives from District 80. Though elected as a Democrat, she switched parties in August 2011, eight months after taking office.

=== Senate ===
In redistricting, Collins was moved to the same 61st House district as Republican incumbent Lori Benedict. Therefore, Collins chose to run for the Arkansas Senate in the 19th district, rather than challenge Benedict. Incumbent Democratic Senator David Wyatt defeated her in the 2012 general election, but on November 4, 2014, she beat Democrat James McLean for the seat. Wyatt died shortly thereafter.

==== Arkansas Physical Privacy and Safety Act ====
In 2017, Collins introduced Senate Bill 774, the Arkansas Physical Privacy and Safety Act, which would prohibit people, including transgender people, from entering government restrooms or changing facilities designated for the opposite sex, as it pertains to "a person's immutable biological sex as objectively determined by anatomy and genetics existing at the time of birth." She said the bill would set a baseline for privacy across the state and shield public schools from lawsuits by organizations "seeking to impose their anti-privacy agenda on our children." It did not pass.

==== True Campus Carry Act ====
In 2017, Collins announced the True Campus Carry Act, which would have allowed concealed-carry license holders to walk armed on campus with no additional training.

==== 2018 Republican Primary ====
Collins frequently butted heads with Governor Asa Hutchinson, both as a result of her proposed legislation as well as her opposition to Medicaid expansion in the state. In May 2018, state representative James Sturch challenged Collins in that month's Republican state senate primary, garnering Hutchinson's support. Collins lost a close race, with 4,726 votes to Sturch's 5,299.

== Personal life ==
Collins was married to Philip Smith, a circuit court judge who was disgraced after a 2017 scandal. She filed for divorce that November. They had two children and three grandchildren.

== Murder ==
On June 4, 2019, Collins's father and son found her body outside her home in Pocahontas; she had died of stab wounds (initially reported as gunshot wounds).

On June 17, Rebecca Lynn O'Donnell of Pocahontas, a former campaign worker and personal friend of Collins, was charged with capital murder, tampering with physical evidence and abuse of a corpse. She initially pleaded not guilty on all three counts, but later pled guilty to murdering Collins and abusing her corpse. On August 6, 2020, O'Donnell pleaded guilty to murder. "I intentionally killed her and then hid the body,” she said during court proceedings. The next day, she was sentenced to 43 years in prison.

Investigators determined that O'Donnell killed Collins on May 28. According to Collins's son, O'Donnell constantly stole money from her and "snapped" when she was confronted about it. However, O'Donnell claimed Collins had not had any income since January and she was taking the money out of a hotel they mutually owned to pay Linda's bills.

In July 2024, a new Dateline episode was released detailing the murder, titled The Hands of the Killer.

== See also ==
- List of American politicians who switched parties in office

Arkansas Senate
Preceded by David Wyatt	Arkansas State Senator for District 19 (including Randolph County); 2015–2019	Succeeded by James Sturch
Arkansas House of Representatives
Preceded by David Cook	Arkansas State Representative for District 80 (Crawford and Washington counties); 2011–2013	Succeeded by Charlene Fite
