= Russell Jail =

- U.S. National Register of Historic Places
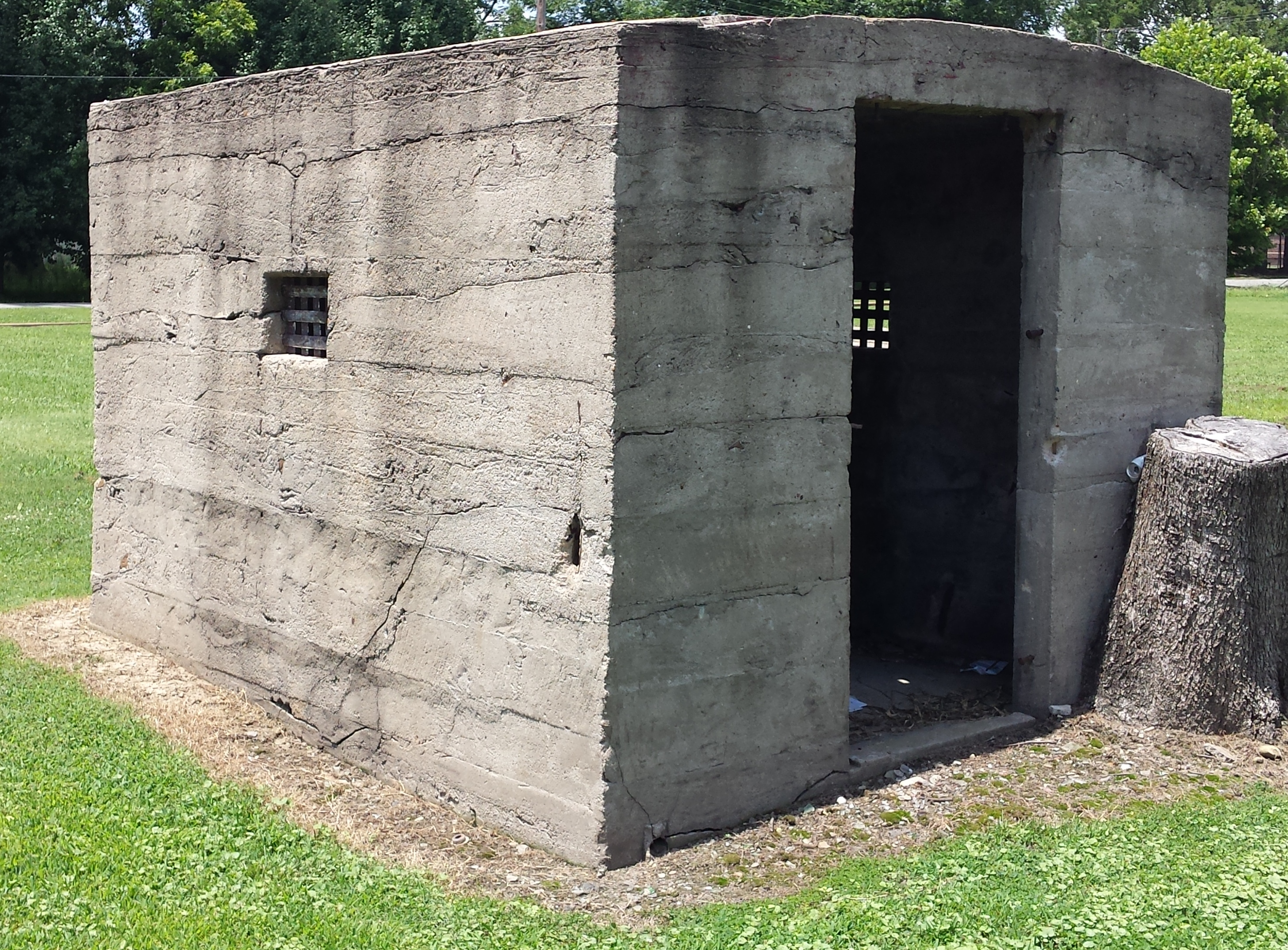

- Location within Arkansas Location within the United States
- Location: Off Elm St., Russell, Arkansas
- Coordinates: 35°21′46″N 91°30′33″W
- Area: less than one acre
- Built by: Works Progress Administration
- MPS: White County MPS
- NRHP reference No.: 91001271
- Added to NRHP: July 23, 1992

The Russell Jail is a historic town holding facility in Russell, Arkansas. It is located near the town post office, in a field at the junction of West Elm Street and Highway Avenue (Arkansas Highway 367). It is a small single-story concrete structure, with a slightly bowed roof, a doorway opening (now lacking its metal door) on one wall, and small square barred openings on the sides. It was built about 1935 with funding support from the Works Progress Administration, and is one just three such structures in White County.

The building was listed on the National Register of Historic Places in 1992.

== See also ==
- Beebe Jail
- McRae Jail
- National Register of Historic Places listings in White County, Arkansas
