= Alene Word =

American politician (1906–1990)

Alene Word (August 27, 1906 – December 18, 1990) was an American lawyer and politician. She served several terms in the Arkansas House of Representatives, from 1943 to 1948. She was the only female legislator in Arkansas in 1947.

== Life and career ==
Word was born on August 27, 1906, in Osceola, Arkansas, to parents Nora Lee (née Davis) and Percy B. Word. She attended Osceola High School.

After graduation she worked as a legal secretary for Charles E. Sullenger. In 1932, she was admitted to the Arkansas bar and was able to practice law with Sullenger. Word became active in local politics the same year. She was a member of the Arkansas House of Representatives from 1943 until 1948.

In 1947, she was proposed matrimony to by another legislator, Dan Stephens.
