= Osceola High School (Arkansas) =

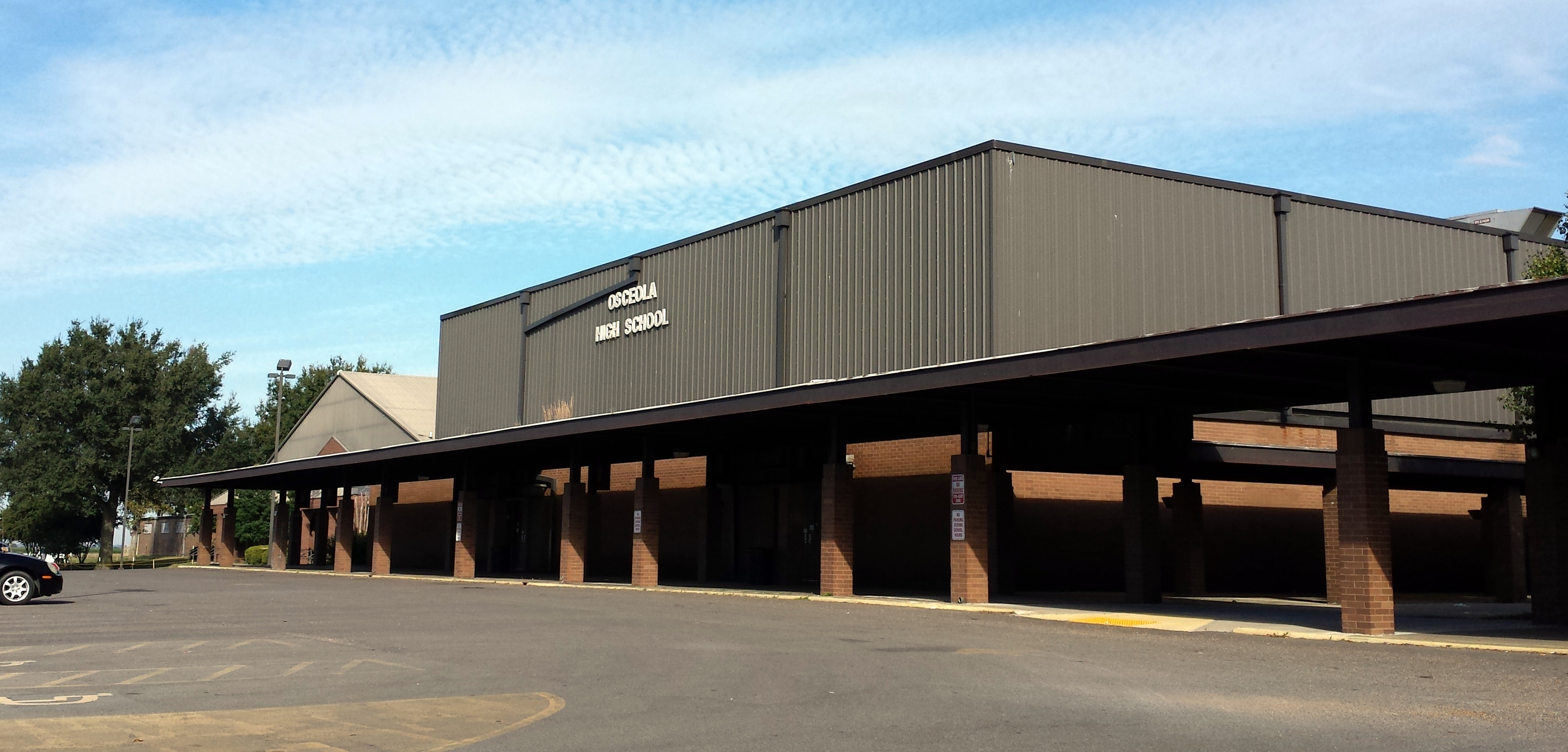

Location
- 2800 West Semmes; Osceola, Arkansas 72370; United States
- Coordinates: 35°42′25″N 90°0′46″W

Information
- School type: Public comprehensive
- Status: Open
- School district: Osceola School District
- CEEB code: 041910
- NCES School ID: 051095000825
- Teaching staff: 28.22 (on FTE basis)
- Grades: 9–12
- Enrollment: 343 (2010–11)
  - Grade 9: 97
  - Grade 10: 82
  - Grade 11: 80
  - Grade 12: 72
- Student to teacher ratio: 12.15
- Education system: ADE Smart Core
- Classes offered: Regular, Advanced Placement (AP)
- Campus type: Rural
- Colors: Purple and gold
- Athletics: Football, Basketball, Baseball, Softball
- Athletics conference: 3A Region 7 West (2012–14)
- Mascot: Seminole
- Team name: Osceola Seminoles
- Accreditation: ADE; AdvancED (1935–)
- Feeder schools: Osceola Middle School (grades 6–8)
- Affiliation: Arkansas Activities Association
- Website: www.osd1.org/o/ohs

Osceola High School is an accredited comprehensive public high school located in Osceola, Arkansas, United States. It is one of six public high schools in Mississippi County, Arkansas and the only high school administered by the Osceola School District. The school provides secondary education in grades 9 through 12 to more than 325 students in Osceola and nearby unincorporated communities.

== Academics ==
The assumed course of study follows the Smart Core curriculum developed by the Arkansas Department of Education (ADE), which requires students complete at least 22 units prior to graduation. Students complete regular coursework and exams and may take Advanced Placement (AP) courses and exam with the opportunity to receive college credit. Osceola High School is accredited by the ADE and has been accredited by AdvancED since 1935.

== Athletics ==
The Osceola High School mascot and athletic emblem is the Seminole (in honor of Seminole leader Osceola) with purple and gold serving as the school colors.

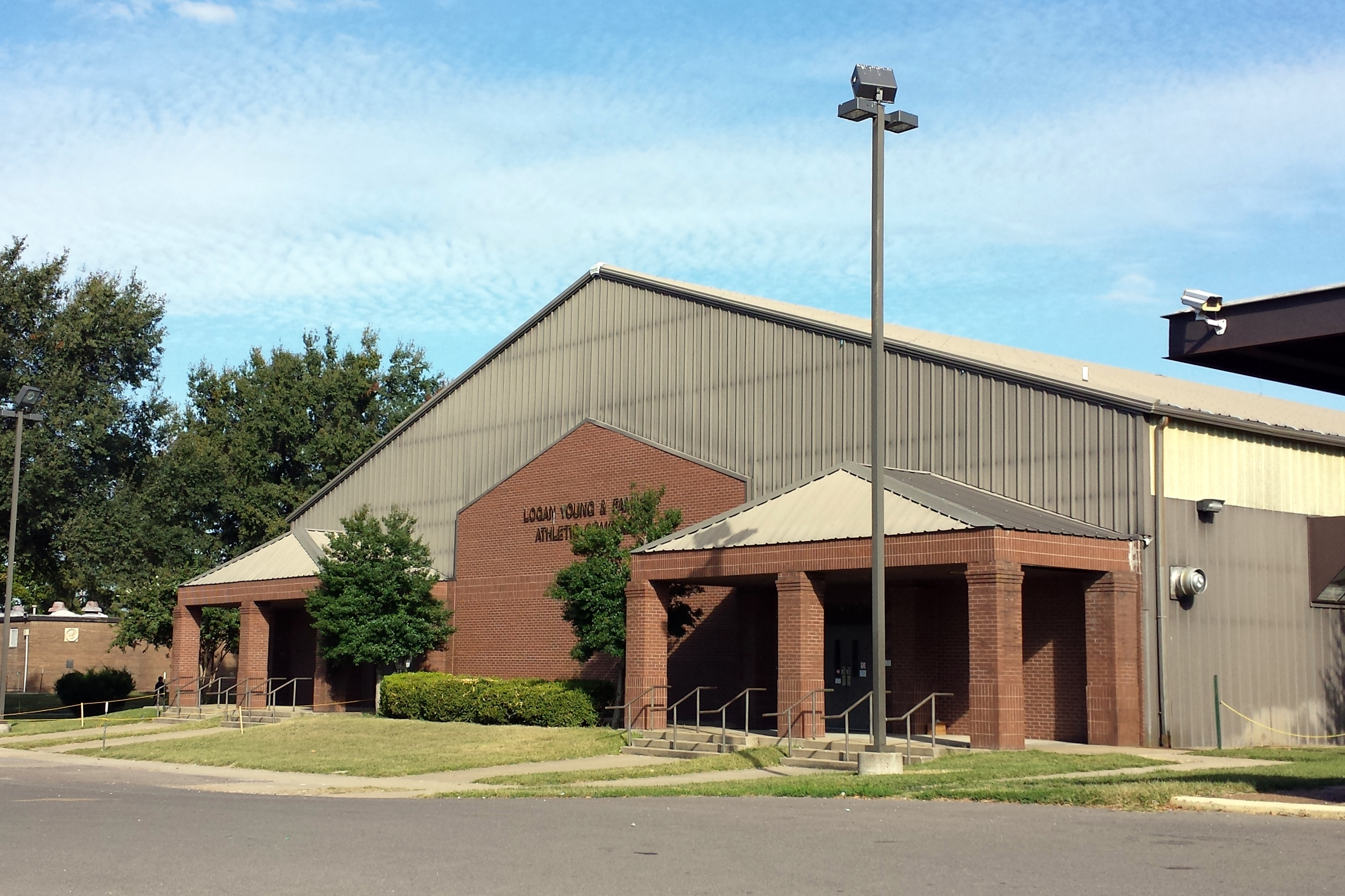
Logan Young and Family Athletic Complex

The Osceola Seminoles compete in interscholastic activities within the 3A Classification administered by the Arkansas Activities Association. The Seminoles play within the 3A Region 3 Conference and participate in football, golf (boys/girls), basketball (boys/girls), competitive cheer, baseball, softball, and track (boys/girls).

== Notable people ==
- William Vollie Alexander, Jr. (1951), retired politician; member of U.S. House of Representatives (1969–1993).
- David Barrett (1995), professional football player.
- Maurice Carthon (1978), professional football coach and former player; two-time Super Bowl champion.
- Buddy Jewell (1979) country music singer who was the first winner on the USA Network talent show Nashville Star.
- Alene Word, lawyer, served several terms in the Arkansas House of Representatives
