= Osceola, Arkansas =

- City
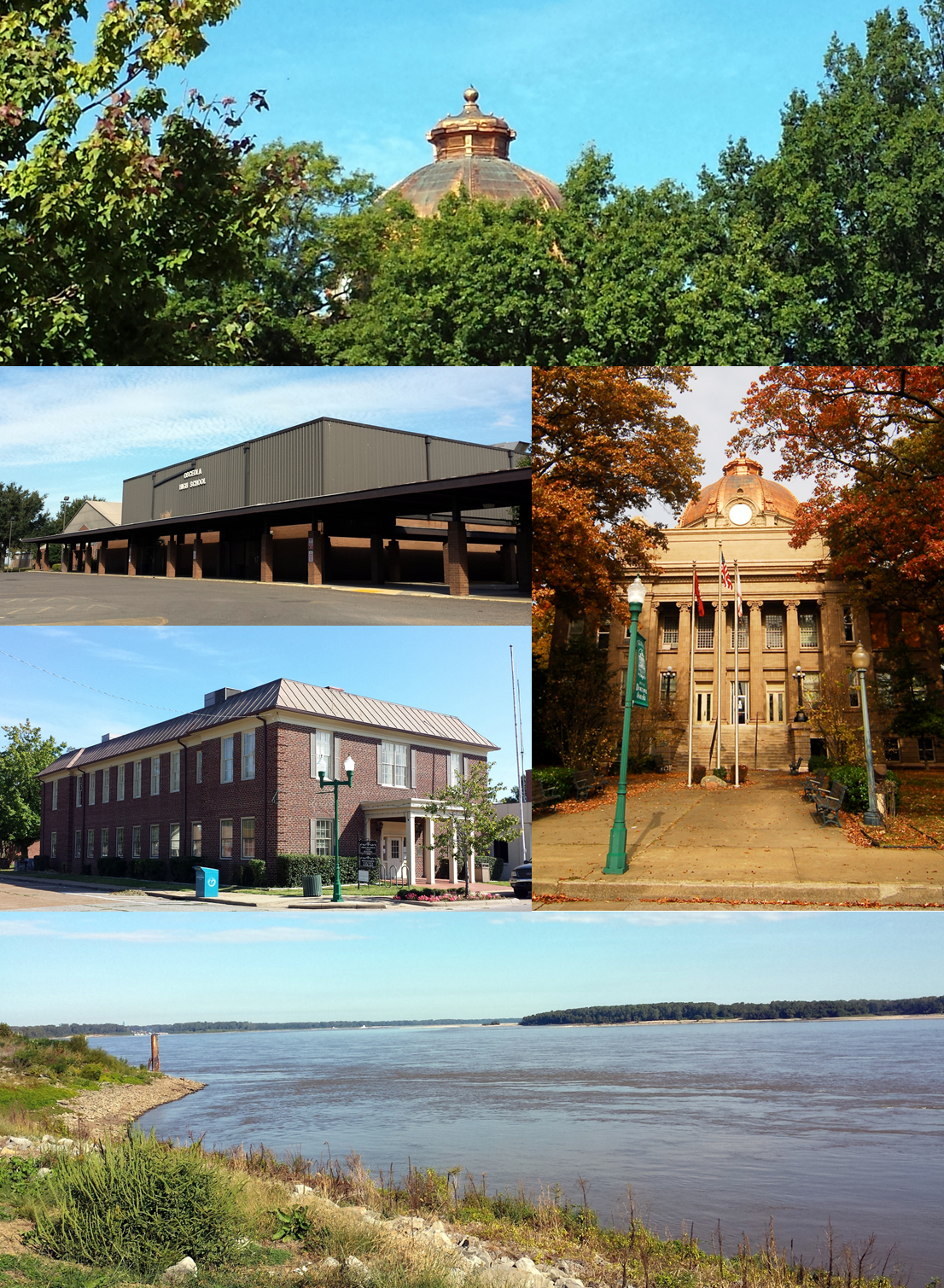
- Clockwise from top: Mississippi County Courthouse copper dome is visible among mature trees as seen from the Hale Avenue Historic District, the courthouse grounds and main entrance, the Mississippi River at Sans Souci landing, Mississippi County Library, Osceola High School

- Location in Mississippi County, Arkansas
- Coordinates: 35°41′40″N 89°59′36″W
- Country: United States
- State: Arkansas
- County: Mississippi
- First Settled: 1830
- First Incorporation (Plum Point): 1837
- Second Incorporation (Osceola): January 12, 1853

Government
  - Type: Mayor–council

Area
  - Total: 9.42 sq mi (24.40 km^{2})
  - Land: 9.42 sq mi (24.40 km^{2})
  - Water: 0 sq mi (0.00 km^{2})
- Elevation: 236 ft (72 m)

Population (2020)
  - Total: 6,976
  - Estimate (2025): 6,450 ▼
  - Density: 740.6/sq mi (285.96/km^{2})
- Time zone: UTC−6 (Central (CST))
  - Summer (DST): UTC−5 (CDT)
- ZIP code: 72370
- Area code: 870
- FIPS code: 05-52580
- GNIS feature ID: 2404446
- Website: osceolaar.org

Osceola is a city in and a dual county seat of Mississippi County, Arkansas, United States. Located along the Mississippi River within the Arkansas Delta, the settlement was founded in 1837 and incorporated in 1853. Occupying an important location on the river, the city's economy grew as steamboat traffic increased. Timber and cotton harvesting would develop, and the city experienced rapid growth and development throughout the early 20th century. The city's economy has since diversified to include a robust industrial sector. The population was 6,976 at the 2020 census, down from 7,757 in 2010.

== History ==
=== Prehistory ===
During the prehistoric period, Osceola and Mississippi County were largely swampland, with dense forest cover. The area was inhabited by Native American tribes. Europeans arrived around the time of the Louisiana Purchase in 1803.

=== Louisiana Purchase through Statehood ===
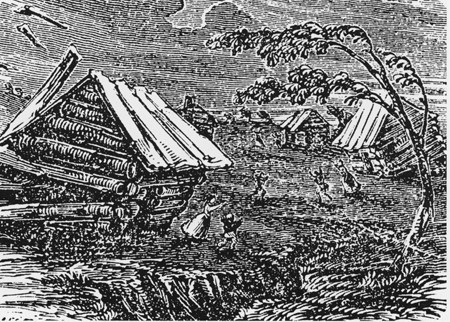
The Great Earthquake at New Madrid, a 19th-century woodcut from Devens' Our First Century (1877)

Initial white visitors to the area were speculators, hunters, and outlaws, but the remote region remained sparsely populated by settlers. The extremely intense New Madrid earthquake swarm, produced by the New Madrid Seismic Zone nearby in present-day Missouri, struck the area in 1811–12. The results were widespread soil liquefaction and a change in geography that produced "sunken lands", which were sandy berms of silt and sediment disturbed by the earthquakes. Some tracts of land were sunk over 50 feet (15 m) and disappeared underneath newly formed lakes (such as Reelfoot Lake in Tennessee), or transformed from green forests to stagnant swamps.

In 1830, following continuing speculation and settlement in the area in the years after the earthquakes, two settlers, William Bard Edrington and John Price Edrington, negotiated the acquisition of Native American lands along the Mississippi River. By this point, the combination of abundant timber as an obvious economic asset and easy access to shippers and travelers along the river began driving growth in the region. In 1837, the settlement adopted the name "Plum Point".

=== Antebellum period, Civil War and Reconstruction ===
The Plum Point community had developed into a successful waypoint on the Mississippi as well as a hub for the timber required to power the steamboats that had become common on America's waterways. Settlers began to explore the uses for the fertile soils now ripe for row agriculture following clearing of the dense forests. It became apparent that the soil supported cotton extremely well, which was already a popular crop elsewhere in the South due to heavy European demand driven by the Industrial Revolution and resulting high market prices. Farmers from other cotton states began to relocate to Mississippi County and throughout the Arkansas Delta, bringing slaves, "King Cotton" culture and the plantation agriculture system with them. In 1853, the community had changed from mostly silviculture to agricultural, had a total of 250 residents, and officially incorporated as "Osceola".

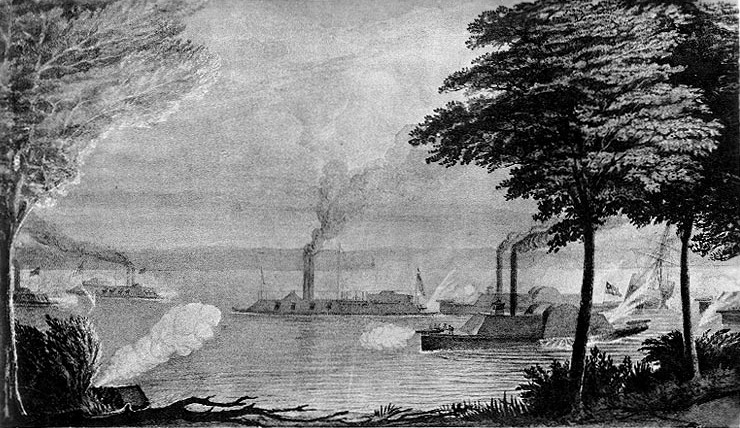
Naval battle at Fort Pillow, Tennessee, May 10, 1862. Confederate ships are seen at right and Federal ironclads are seen in the center and left.

Osceola strongly supported secession in 1861, and raised a volunteer company called the Osceola Hornets to fight for the Confederacy. The unit was under command of Captain Charles Bowen within the 2nd Confederate Infantry. Osceola saw thousands of Union troops enter the area in 1862 in preparation to assault Fort Pillow and Memphis. On the river, the Battle of Plum Point Bend took place between the Confederate River Defense Fleet and the Union Mississippi River Squadron in 1862. Osceola itself was mostly subject to raids from both armies and guerrilla warfare that resulted in burning, pillaging and damage throughout the city.

Following the Civil War, race relations began to tighten between plantation owners who had lost the slave labor that fueled their successful plantations, poor whites who were suddenly in competition for work and social status with freedmen, and the former slaves who continued to face deprivation of their rights despite the war's outcome. Whitecapping by the Ku Klux Klan and other groups promoted a lawless atmosphere in Mississippi County. Violent racial encounters were common in the county and throughout the Arkansas Delta. An extreme example from Mississippi County was nicknamed the Black Hawk War. The racial violence and lawlessness continued to escalate, eventually resulting in Governor Powell Clayton declaring Mississippi County and thirteen other counties under martial law from November 1868 until March 1869.

The city was incorporated a second time in 1872, with newspaper owner Leon Roussan being elected as the mayor.

=== The New South ===
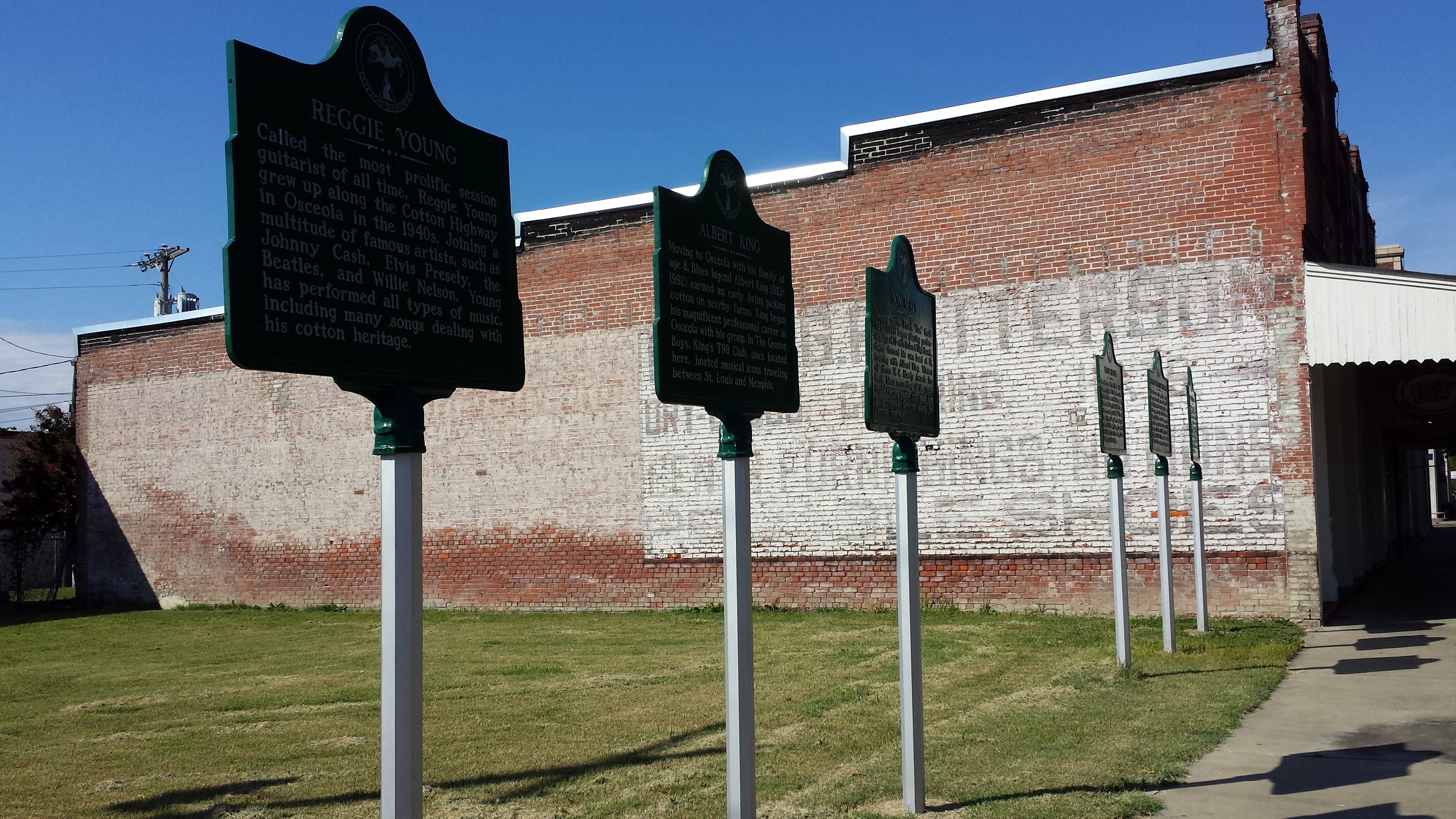
Historic markers in downtown Osceola detailing performances by notable musicians

Osceola is the county seat of Mississippi County, and is also the seat of one of two judicial districts. Blytheville was named a secondary judicial district in 1901.

Anchoring the town square is the 1912 neoclassical Mississippi County Courthouse, with a copper-roofed dome. The courthouse is bordered by the Hale Avenue Historic District and other structures on the National Historic Register of Historic Places. The Mississippi County Historical Center is located in a 1904 building that once housed a dry goods store.

Osceola is famous for its role in the development of blues music, and many famous blues musicians either came from Osceola or performed there. To celebrate this heritage, Main Street Osceola has been hosting the Osceola Heritage Festival since 1998.

== Geography ==
Osceola is located in east-central Mississippi County. The city's eastern border follows the levee that protects it from the Mississippi River. The Tennessee border is less than 1,000 feet (300 m) to the east of the levee, in a narrow channel of the Mississippi separated from the main river by Island Number 30. To the west the city limits extend as far as Interstate 55 and its Exit 48 (Arkansas Highway 140 / West Keiser Avenue). I-55 leads north 18 miles (29 km) to Blytheville and south 42 miles (68 km) to West Memphis. U.S. Route 61 is the main road through the center of Osceola, using Keiser Avenue and Walnut Street.

According to the United States Census Bureau, the city of Osceola has a total area of 9.4 square miles (24 km^{2}), all land.

=== Region ===
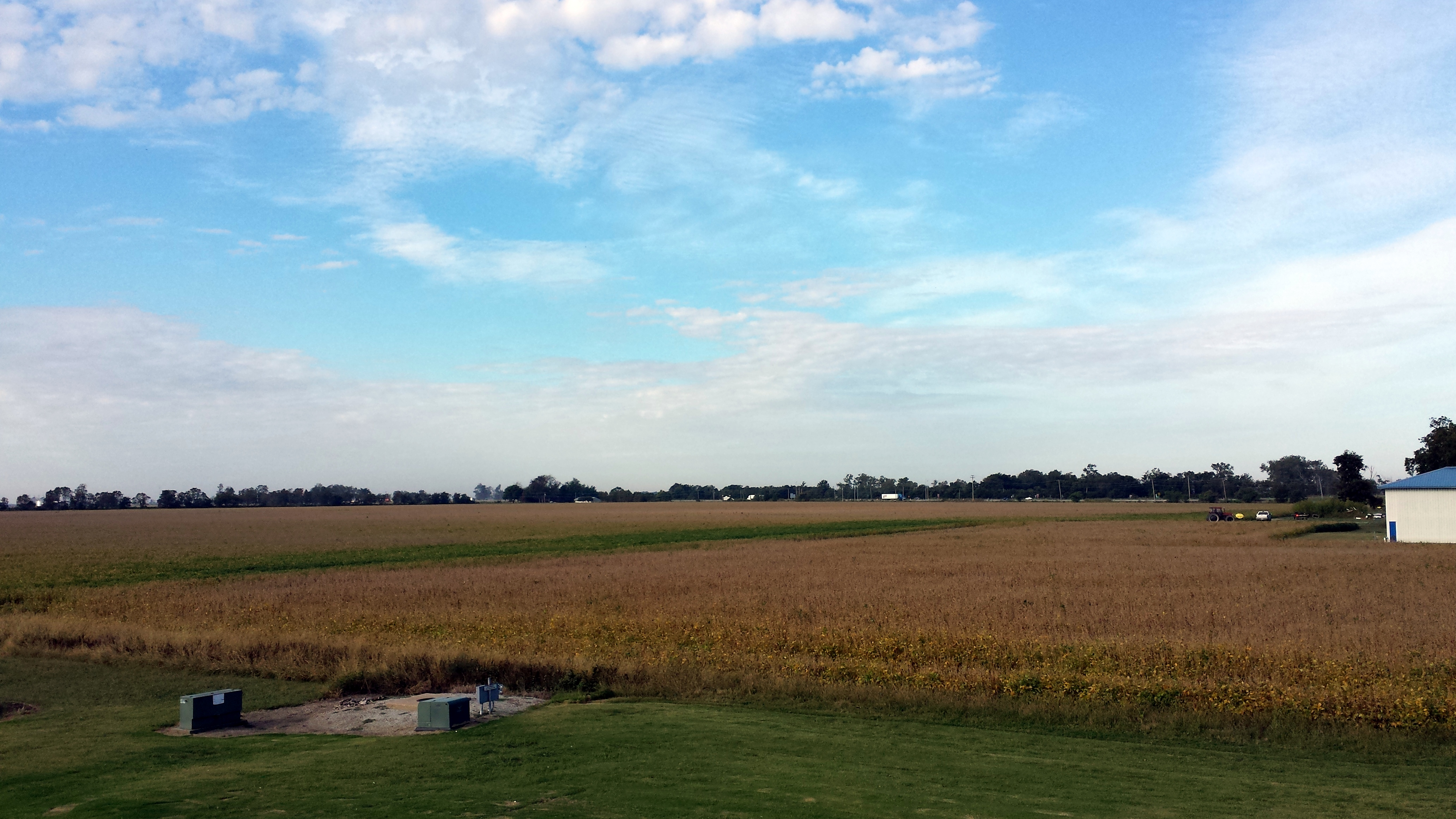
Flat fields in cultivation, such as this one in western Osceola, are typical across the Arkansas Delta.

The county is located in the Arkansas Delta, one of the six primary geographic regions of Arkansas. The Arkansas Delta is a subregion of the Mississippi Alluvial Plain, which is a flat area consisting of rich, fertile sediment deposits from the Mississippi River between Louisiana and Illinois.

=== Geology ===
Osceola is within the New Madrid Seismic Zone, a major seismic zone and a prolific source of intraplate earthquakes. The area experienced the highest magnitude earthquake in North America east of the Rocky Mountains in the 1811–12 New Madrid earthquakes.

=== Hydrology ===
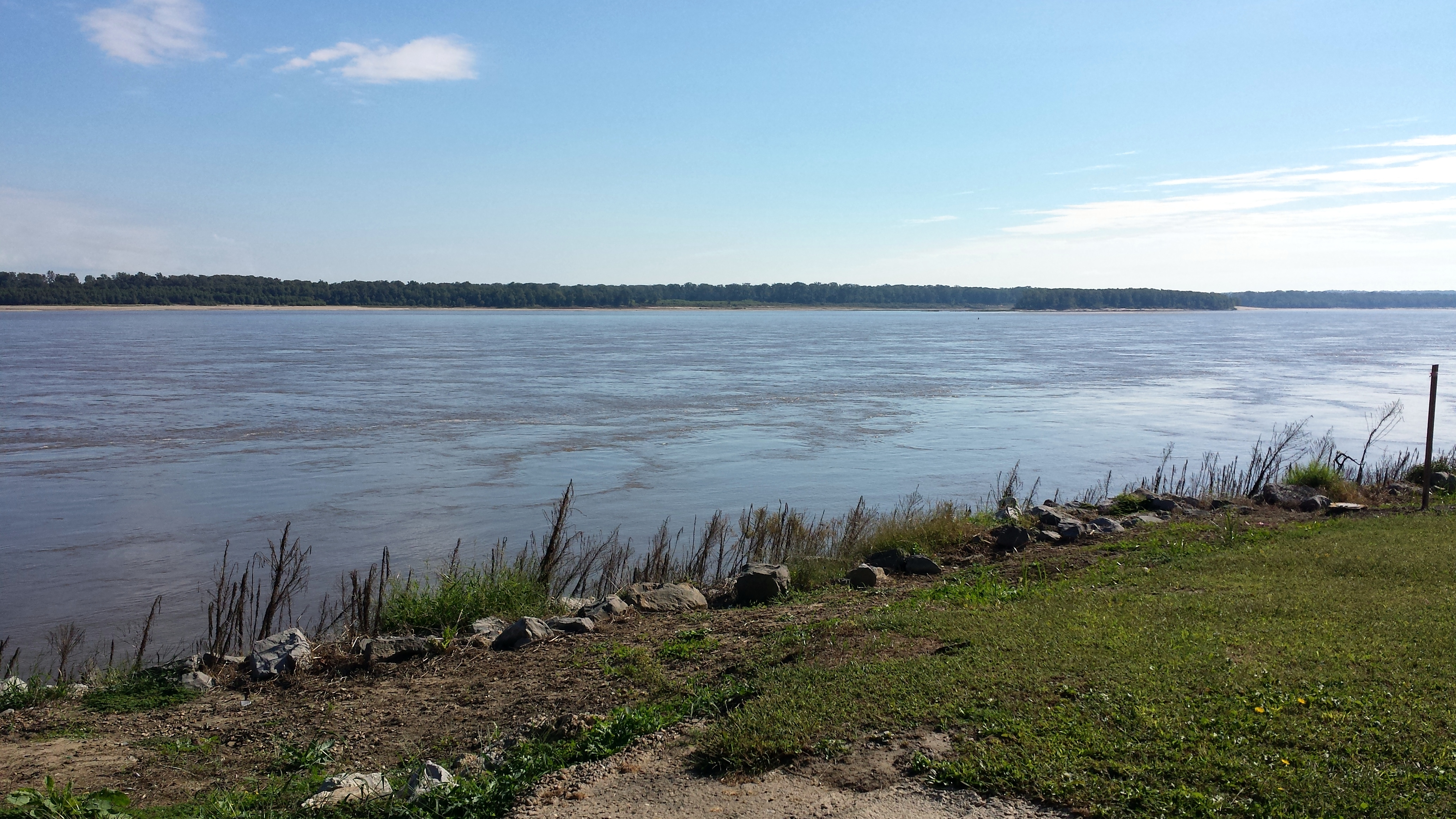
Mississippi River at Sans Souci Landing

The eastern edge of Osceola is the Mississippi River, which is also the state border between Arkansas and Tennessee. The river has provided opportunity for the Osceola since it was founded as a waypoint for river travelers in 1833. Steamboats allowed Osceola to continue to leverage its position on the river as a shipping port for timber and cotton from the surrounding fields.

Although critical to the growth and development of Osceola, the river has also been a source of adversity for the community. The Great Mississippi Flood of 1927, the most destructive river flood in the history of the United States, and another flood in 1937 both damaged Osceola significantly, displacing hundreds of citizens and ruining crops.

=== Climate ===
Osceola has a humid subtropical climate (Köppen climate classification Cfa).

Climate data for Osceola, Arkansas
Month	Jan	Feb	Mar	Apr	May	Jun	Jul	Aug	Sep	Oct	Nov	Dec	Year
Mean daily maximum °F (°C)	45 (7)	51 (11)	60 (16)	71 (22)	80 (27)	89 (32)	92 (33)	90 (32)	84 (29)	74 (23)	60 (16)	49 (9)	70 (21)
Mean daily minimum °F (°C)	28 (−2)	32 (0)	41 (5)	49 (9)	59 (15)	67 (19)	71 (22)	68 (20)	60 (16)	48 (9)	40 (4)	31 (−1)	50 (10)
Average precipitation inches (mm)	3.69 (94)	3.78 (96)	4.87 (124)	4.90 (124)	5.57 (141)	4.06 (103)	3.56 (90)	2.67 (68)	3.65 (93)	3.38 (86)	4.84 (123)	4.55 (116)	49.52 (1,258)

== Demographics ==
Historical population
Census	Pop.	Note	%±
1880	317		—
1890	458		44.5%
1900	953		108.1%
1910	1,769		85.6%
1920	1,755		−0.8%
1930	2,573		46.6%
1940	3,226		25.4%
1950	5,006		55.2%
1960	6,189		23.6%
1970	7,892		27.5%
1980	8,881		12.5%
1990	8,930		0.6%
2000	8,875		−0.6%
2010	7,757		−12.6%
2020	6,976		−10.1%
2025 (est.)	6,450	▼	−7.5%
U.S. Decennial Census

=== Racial and ethnic composition ===
Osceola city, Arkansas – Racial and ethnic composition Note: the US Census treats Hispanic/Latino as an ethnic category. This table excludes Latinos from the racial categories and assigns them to a separate category. Hispanics/Latinos may be of any race.
Race / Ethnicity (NH = Non-Hispanic)	Pop 2000	Pop 2010	Pop 2020	% 2000	% 2010	% 2020
White alone (NH)	4,168	3,253	2,569	46.96%	41.94%	36.83%
Black or African American alone (NH)	4,496	4,178	3,893	50.66%	53.86%	55.81%
Native American or Alaska Native alone (NH)	9	8	7	0.10%	0.10%	0.10%
Asian alone (NH)	22	18	45	0.25%	0.23%	0.65%
Native Hawaiian or Pacific Islander alone (NH)	0	0	0	0.00%	0.00%	0.00%
Other race alone (NH)	3	6	10	0.03%	0.08%	0.14%
Mixed race or Multiracial (NH)	58	103	230	0.65%	1.33%	3.30%
Hispanic or Latino (any race)	119	191	222	1.34%	2.46%	3.18%
Total	8,875	7,757	6,976	100.00%	100.00%	100.00%

=== 2020 census ===
As of the 2020 census, Osceola had a population of 6,976. The median age was 36.1 years. 25.9% of residents were under the age of 18 and 14.3% were 65 years of age or older. For every 100 females, there were 95.4 males, and for every 100 females age 18 and over, there were 93.3 males.

There were 2,758 households and 1,728 families in the city. Of all households, 32.5% had children under the age of 18 living in them. 28.1% were married-couple households, 22.3% were households with a male householder and no spouse or partner present, and 43.3% were households with a female householder and no spouse or partner present. About 33.3% of all households were made up of individuals, and 11.7% had someone living alone who was 65 years of age or older.

There were 3,210 housing units, of which 14.1% were vacant. The homeowner vacancy rate was 2.7% and the rental vacancy rate was 11.1%. 88.9% of residents lived in urban areas, while 11.1% lived in rural areas.

=== 2010 census ===
As of the 2010 United States census, there were 7,757 people living in the city. The racial makeup of the city was 53.9% Black, 41.9% White, 0.1% Native American, 0.2% Asian, 0.1% from some other race and 1.3% from two or more races. 2.5% were Hispanic or Latino of any race.

=== 2000 census ===
As of the census of 2000, there were 8,875 people, 3,183 households, and 2,314 families living in the city. The population density was 1,135.9 inhabitants per square mile (438.6/km^{2}). There were 3,551 housing units at an average density of 454.5 per square mile (175.5/km^{2}). The racial makeup of the city was 51.03% Black or African American, 47.39% White, 0.10% Native American, 0.25% Asian, 0.41% from other races, and 0.82% from two or more races. 1.34% of the population were Hispanic or Latino of any race.

There were 2,724 households, out of which 38.5% had children under the age of 18 living with them, 43.3% were married couples living together, 25.2% had a female householder with no husband present, and 27.3% were non-families. 24.4% of all households were made up of individuals, and 10.3% had someone living alone who was 65 years of age or older. The average household size was 2.70 and the average family size was 3.20.

In the city, the age distribution of the population shows 29.4% under the age of 18, 11.0% from 18 to 24, 26.4% from 25 to 44, 19.3% from 45 to 64, and 11.3% who were 65 years of age or older. The median age was 30 years. For every 100 females, there were 90.2 males. For every 100 females age 18 and over, there were 82.9 males.

The median income for a household in the city was $23,163, and the median income for a family was $26,588. Males had a median income of $27,526 versus $18,788 for females. The per capita income for the city was $16,327. About 26.0% of families and 31.4% of the population were below the poverty line, including 41.0% of those under age 18 and 25.7% of those age 65 or over.

== Government ==
=== Mayor–city council ===
Osceola operates within the mayor-city council form of government. The mayor is elected by a citywide election to serve as the chief executive officer (CEO) of the city by presiding over all city functions, policies, rules and laws. Once elected, the mayor also allocates duties to city employees. The city council consists of six members, two elected from each of the cities three wards, who form the legislative body for the city. Also included in the council's duties is balancing the city's budget and passing ordinances. The body also controls the representatives of specialized city commissions underneath their jurisdiction.

== Education ==
Public education for early childhood, elementary and secondary students is provided by the Osceola School District, which leads students to graduate from Osceola High School. The mascot and athletic emblem is the Seminole with purple and gold serving as the school colors.

== Infrastructure ==
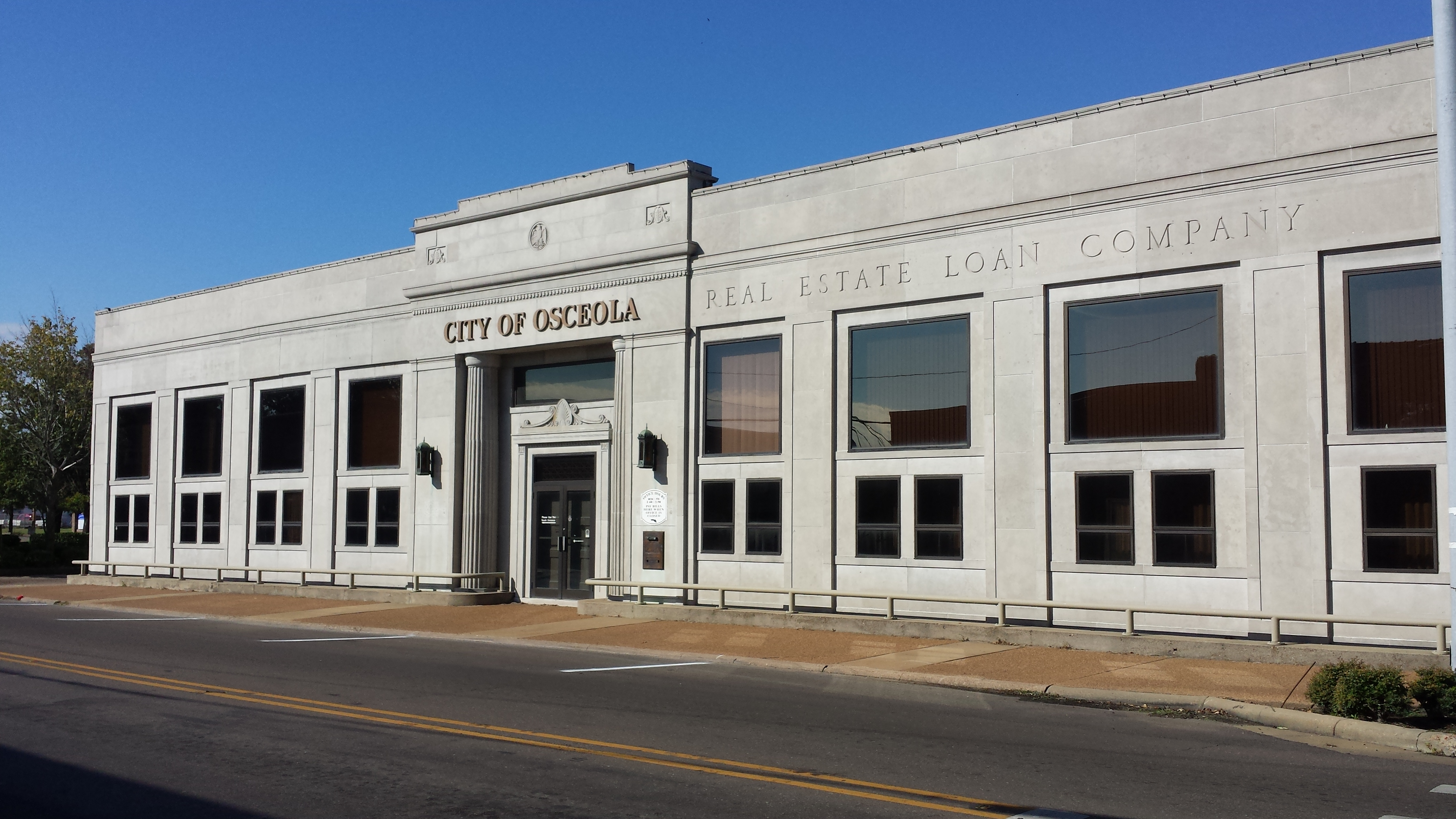
The Public Works Department is based out of City Hall at 303 W. Hale in the former Mississippi County Bank building

The City of Osceola Public Works Department contains seven subdivisions responsible for providing essential city services to the citizens and businesses of Osceola. Directly under city administration are the Animal Shelter, Code Enforcement, Fire Department and Police Department. A municipally owned entity named Osceola Municipal Light & Power houses the Electric, Street and Sanitation, and Water & Wastewater departments.

=== Electric ===
Osceola Municipal Light & Power provides power to customers within Osceola, and some nearby customers beyond the city limits via a distribution system they own and operate. The power source is a mixture of city generation facilities and purchased power from Mississippi County Electric Cooperative, a member of Arkansas Electric Cooperative Corporation.

=== Water/Wastewater ===
Osceola's source for drinking water is the Wilcox Aquifer, located 1,500 feet (460 m) beneath the city. Three sites throughout town pump raw water from this aquifer to the ground surface, where air is added to lower the iron content. Next, chlorine, lime and polymer are added to soften the water. The water is then clarified, filtered and held in ground storage tanks (600,000 US gallons (2,300,000 L) total capacity) before being pumped into a 120 feet (37 m), 1.25-million-US-gallon (4,700,000 L) elevated storage tank, which set the city's static water pressure. The city owns and operates approximately 45 miles (72 km) of water mains, ranging in diameter from 2–16 inches (51–406 mm) with an average static pressure of 52 pounds per square inch (360 kPa). Osceola experiences an average demand of 1.75 million US gallons (6,600,000 L) per day. A wellhead protection ordinance has been in effect since 2002.

Wastewater is collected from customers and conveyed using gravity sewers, lift stations and force mains. The system has 21 lift stations to pump wastewater over rises in terrain where gravity flow is not economical. Wastewater ultimately reaches the Osceola Wastewater Treatment Facility (WWTF), which has a design capacity of 2.5 million US gallons (9,500,000 L) per day. At the WWTF, influent wastewater is treated in faculative lagoons in accordance with the city's NPDES permit administrated by the Arkansas Department of Environmental Quality (ADEQ). Water is treated within the lagoons for two to four months before being discharged to the Mississippi River via a pumping station. An industrial pretreatment program has been in effect since 2004.

== Industry ==
Osceola is home to several industries that manufacture a variety of items. American Greetings, a privately owned American company which is the world's largest greeting card producer, opened in Osceola in 1961 as the largest manufacturing facility under one roof in Arkansas. The plant occupies 2.6 million square feet or 60 acres and is the largest employer in Mississippi County.

In 2016, Big River Steel, a $1.3 billion Flex Mill focused on producing flat-rolled steel for the automotive oil and gas, and electrical energy industries, opened in Osceola, after being announced in 2013. It is the biggest and one of the most technologically advanced construction project to ever take place in Arkansas.

In 2022, Envirotech Electric Vehicles announced that they will move their manufacturing operations from California, USA to Osceola, Arkansas resulting in about 800 jobs and an investment of $80.7 million investment over the next five years.

Other industry:

- Actagro – Organic and acid-based fertilizers
- Arkansas Steel Processing – Steel Cutting
- Bunge Corp – Agribusiness grain merchandising
- Consolidated Grain and Barge – Agribusiness grain merchandising
- DENSO Manufacturing – Car air conditioners, heavy equipment, radiators
- Evonik CYRO – Acrylic plastic sheeting
- Kagome Creative Foods – Margarine, flavored oils & seasoning
- Mid-River Terminal – Barge loading and unloading
- NAES Plum Point Power Station – 665MW pulverised coal plant
- Producers Mid-South – Cottonseed products & storage
- SMS Millcraft – Industrial Maintenance
- Systex Products – HVAC molding parts for Toyota
- Telling Industries – Steel studs
- Viskase Corp – Cellulosic casings for the meat industry

== Notable people ==
- Bill Alexander, U.S. Representative from First Congressional District, 1969–1993
- David Barrett, New York Jets cornerback
- Joseph H. Bradford, lawyer and state legislator
- Maurice Carthon, former NFL and USFL player
- Ran Carthon, former running back with the Indianapolis Colts and general manager of the Tennessee Titans
- Dale Evans, wife of Roy Rogers, TV and movie star
- Calvin Frazier, blues guitarist
- Buddy Jewell, the first Nashville Star winner
- Cortez Kennedy, former NFL defensive lineman
- Albert King, blues musician
- Robert "Say" McIntosh, political and civil rights activist
- Gaylon Nickerson, former NBA player
- Bill Ramsey, played baseball for the Boston Braves
- Billy Lee Riley, Sun Records artist, rockabilly star
- Harvey Scales, rhythm and blues and soul music performer
- Son Seals, blues guitarist
- Jimmy Thomas, soul singer; member of the Ike & Tina Turner Revue
- James Williams, former NFL player
- Kemmons Wilson, Holiday Inn founder
- Alene Word (1906–1990) American politician
- Reggie Young, guitar legend recording artist, Elvis, Nashville
