= McRae Jail =

- U.S. National Register of Historic Places
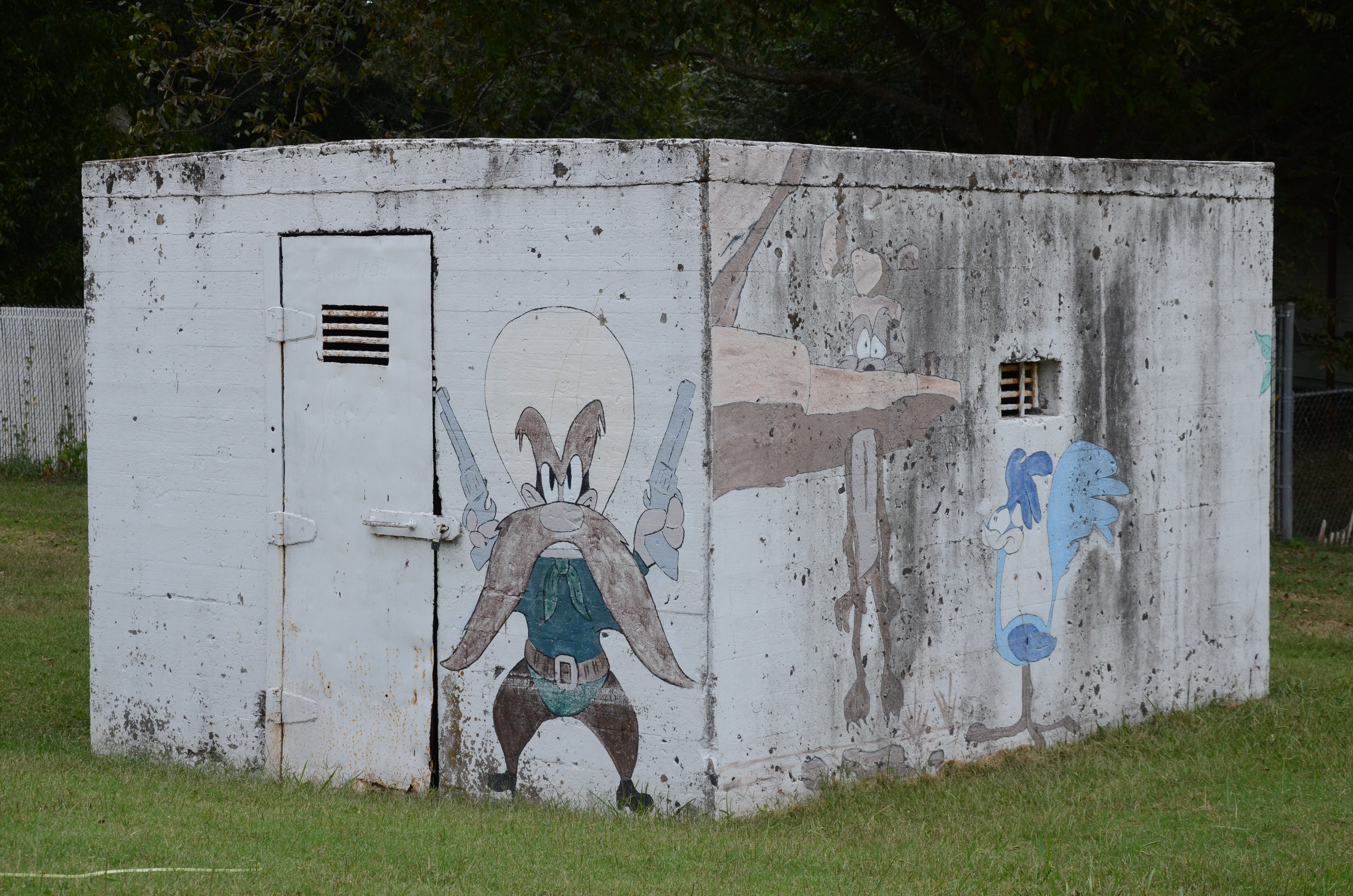

- Location within Arkansas Location within the United States
- Location: E. First St., McRae, Arkansas
- Coordinates: 35°6′48″N 91°49′16″W
- Area: less than one acre
- Built: 1934
- Built by: Works Progress Administration
- Architectural style: WPA architecture
- MPS: White County MPS
- NRHP reference No.: 91001344
- Added to NRHP: July 20, 1992

The McRae Jail is a former local jail on East First Street in McRae, Arkansas. It is a small single-story masonry structure, built out of cast concrete. It has a single door with a barred opening, and small openings on the sides, also barred. Built about 1934 with funding from the Works Progress Administration (WPA), it is one of three jails built in White County by the WPA, and is of those three the best preserved.

The building was listed on the National Register of Historic Places in 1992.

== See also ==
- Beebe Jail
- Russell Jail
- National Register of Historic Places listings in White County, Arkansas
