= Beebe School District =

School district in Arkansas, United States

Address
- 1201 West Center Street Beebe, Arkansas, 72012; United States

District information
- Type: Public
- Grades: PreK–12
- NCES District ID: 0502880

Students and staff
- Students: 3,266
- Teachers: 257.32
- Staff: 213.33
- Student–teacher ratio: 12.69

Other information
- Website: www.beebebadgers.org

Beebe School District is a public school district in Beebe, White County, Arkansas, United States. It serves Beebe, McRae, and El Paso.

On July 1, 2004, the McRae School District merged into the Beebe School District.

== Schools ==
- Beebe Elementary School
- Beebe Middle School
- Beebe Junior High
- Beebe High School

== Awards and recognition ==
The Beebe School District was one of four Arkansas school districts recognized in the 4th Annual AP District Honor Roll as being honored for increasing access to AP course work while simultaneously maintaining or increasing the percentage of students earning scores of 3 or higher on Advanced Placement (AP) Exams from 2011 to 2013.
