= Beebe Jail =

- U.S. National Register of Historic Places
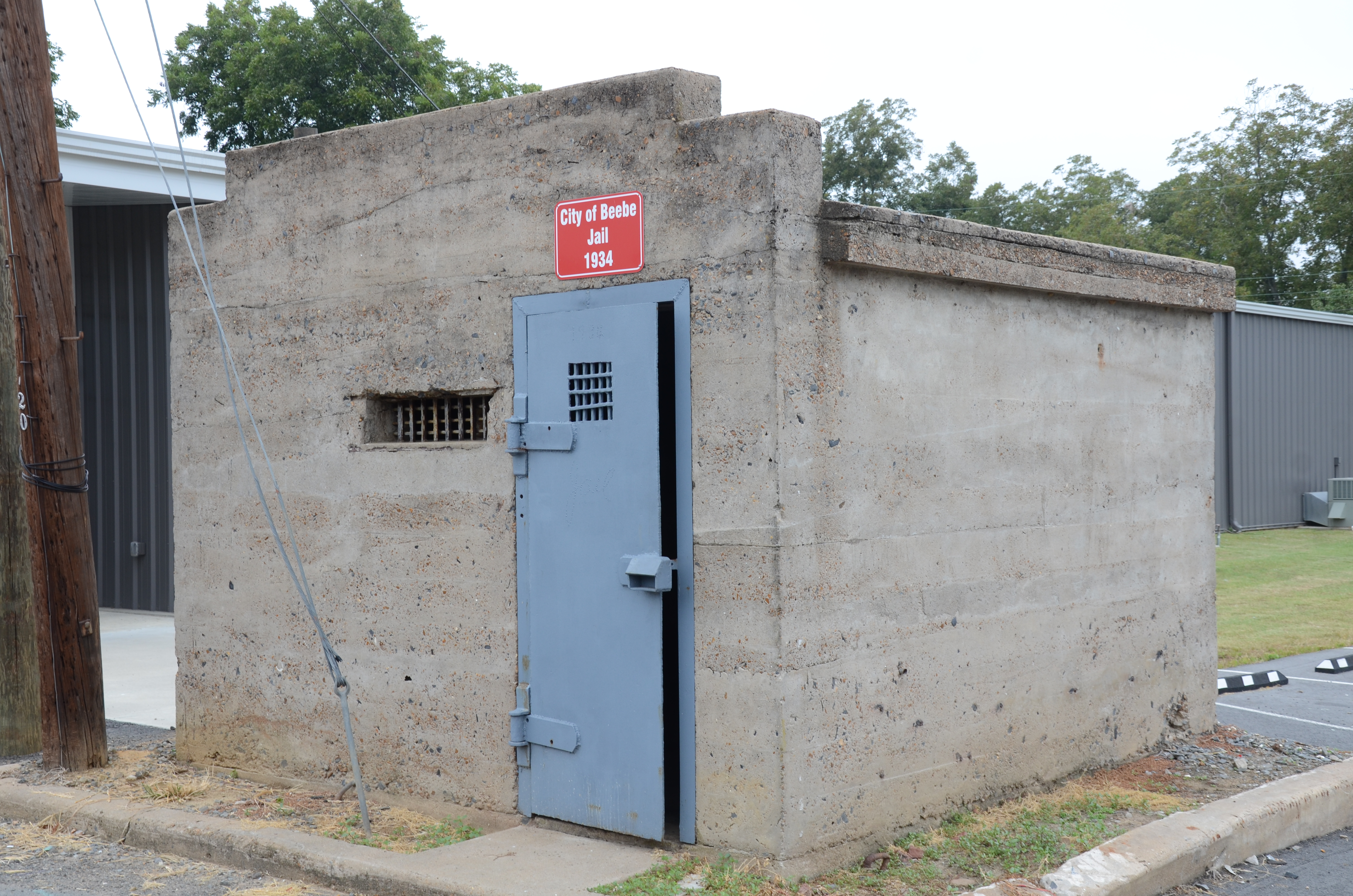

- Location within Arkansas Location within the United States
- Location: E of jct. of N. Main and Illinois Sts., Beebe, Arkansas
- Coordinates: 35°4′16″N 91°52′33″W
- Area: less than one acre
- Built: 1934
- Architect: Works Progress Administration
- Architectural style: WPA architecture
- MPS: White County MPS
- NRHP reference No.: 91001251
- Added to NRHP: September 13, 1991

The Beebe Jail is a historic jail building in Beebe, Arkansas. The small single-story concrete structure is set on an alley south of East Illinois Street on the east side of North Main Street. It is distinctive for its slightly rounded concrete roof, with a parapet rising above the front (southwest) facade. The interior has two small cells, each with a barred window, and a small vestibule area. The jail was built as a Works Progress Administration project in 1934.

The building was listed on the National Register of Historic Places in 1991.

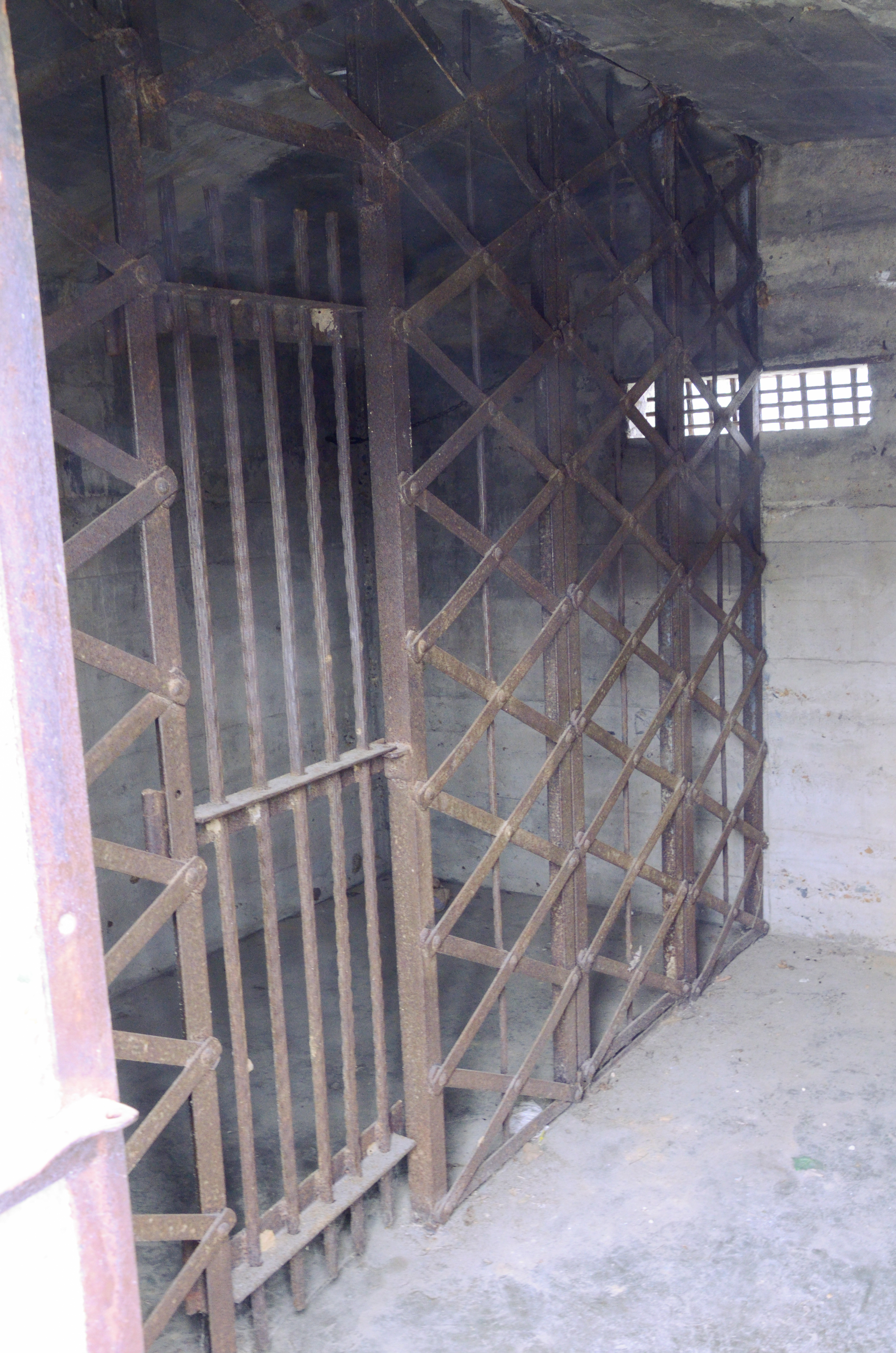
Interior view of the jail

== See also ==
- McRae Jail
- Russell Jail
- National Register of Historic Places listings in White County, Arkansas
