= Steve Crowell =

American politician

Member of the Arkansas Senate from the 3rd district
- Incumbent
- Assumed office January 9, 2023
- Preceded by: Charles Beckham (redistricting)

Personal details
- Party: Republican

Steve Crowell is an American politician. He has represented the 3rd district in the Arkansas Senate since January 2023.

== Life and career ==
Crowell attended Mankato State University. He was a member of the Magnolia City Council.

In May 2022, Crowell defeated Charles Beckham in the Republican primary election for the 3rd district of the Arkansas Senate. No candidate was nominated to challenge him in the general election.
