= Bruce Maloch =

American politician

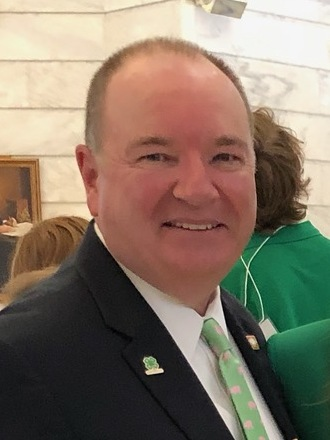
- Maloch in 2019

Member of the Arkansas Senate from the 12th district
- In office January 14, 2013 – January 11, 2021
- Preceded by: David Wyatt
- Succeeded by: Charles Beckham

Member of the Arkansas House of Representatives from the 4th district
- In office 2005–2011
- Preceded by: Russ Bennett
- Succeeded by: Lane Jean

Personal details
- Born: June 29, 1957 (age 69) Magnolia, Arkansas, U.S.
- Party: Democratic
- Spouse: Martha Maloch
- Children: 3
- Education: Southern Arkansas University; William H. Bowen School of Law
- Profession: Banker and attorney

Bruce Maloch (/ˈmælək/ MAL-ək; born June 29, 1957) is an attorney and politician in South Arkansas.

== Education and personal life ==
Maloch was raised on a farm near Emerson, Arkansas. He received a Bachelor of Business Administration in Agricultural Business from Southern Arkansas University and a Juris Doctor with honors from the University of Arkansas at Little Rock's William H. Bowen School of Law. He has also attended programs at Georgetown University and Southern Methodist University.

== Career ==
Maloch was elected to the Arkansas House of Representatives in 2004, serving three terms. While in the House, he served as Chairman of the Joint Budget Committee. Maloch was recognized as Legislator of the Year by the Arkansas Realtors Association, in addition to being recognized as Outstanding Legislator by the Arkansas Municipal League.

Maloch was elected to the Arkansas State Senate in 2012. He was elected without any Republican opposition.

Maloch has practiced law with Anderson, Crumpler, Bell, and Maloch. He has worked for Farmers Bank and Trust Co. since 1986, currently serving as chief operating officer and general counsel.

Maloch has been affiliated with Abilities Unlimited, Arkansas Farm Bureau Young Farmers and Ranchers State Committee, Arkansas FFA Foundation, Arkansas Cattlemen's Association, Arkansas State Fair and Livestock Association, Columbia County Cattlemen's Association, Columbia County Farm Bureau, Columbia County Industrial Development Corporation, Magnolia Rotary Club, and the South Arkansas Development Council (Past Board Member).
