= McRae, Arkansas =

- City
- Location of McRae in White County, Arkansas.
- Coordinates: 35°06′43″N 91°49′31″W
- Country: United States
- State: Arkansas
- County: White

Government
  - Mayor: Joel Pruitt

Area
  - Total: 0.68 sq mi (1.75 km^{2})
  - Land: 0.67 sq mi (1.74 km^{2})
  - Water: 0.0039 sq mi (0.01 km^{2})
- Elevation: 226 ft (69 m)

Population (2020)
  - Total: 616
  - Estimate (2025): 617 ▲
  - Density: 915.4/sq mi (353.43/km^{2})
- Time zone: UTC-6 (Central (CST))
  - Summer (DST): UTC-5 (CDT)
- ZIP code: 72102
- Area code: 501
- FIPS code: 05-43220
- GNIS feature ID: 2405055

McRae is a city in White County, Arkansas, United States. As of the 2020 census, McRae had a population of 616.

== Geography ==
According to the United States Census Bureau, the city has a total area of 0.5 square miles (1.3 km^{2}), all land.

== Demographics ==
Historical population
Census	Pop.	Note	%±
1920	467		—
1930	458		−1.9%
1940	420		−8.3%
1950	414		−1.4%
1960	428		3.4%
1970	643		50.2%
1980	641		−0.3%
1990	669		4.4%
2000	661		−1.2%
2010	682		3.2%
2020	616		−9.7%
2025 (est.)	617	▲	0.2%
U.S. Decennial Census

As of the census of 2000, there were 661 people, 280 households, and 185 families residing in the city. The population density was 1,312.5 inhabitants per square mile (506.8/km^{2}). There were 312 housing units at an average density of 619.5 per square mile (239.2/km^{2}). The racial makeup of the city was 95.31% White, 0.45% Black or African American, 0.61% Native American, 1.06% from other races, and 2.57% from two or more races. 4.08% of the population were Hispanic or Latino of any race.

There were 280 households, out of which 28.9% had children under the age of 18 living with them, 50.0% were married couples living together, 12.1% had a female householder with no husband present, and 33.9% were non-families. 30.7% of all households were made up of individuals, and 17.5% had someone living alone who was 65 years of age or older. The average household size was 2.36 and the average family size was 2.94.

In the city, the population was spread out, with 23.8% under the age of 18, 10.1% from 18 to 24, 25.1% from 25 to 44, 23.4% from 45 to 64, and 17.5% who were 65 years of age or older. The median age was 38 years. For every 100 females, there were 89.9 males. For every 100 females age 18 and over, there were 84.6 males.

The median income for a household in the city was $20,750, and the median income for a family was $25,833. Males had a median income of $25,774 versus $17,500 for females. The per capita income for the city was $10,917. About 19.2% of families and 22.0% of the population were below the poverty line, including 24.6% of those under age 18 and 17.1% of those age 65 or over.

== Government ==
McRae is governed by a mayor-council form of government, led since 2019 by mayor Joel Pruitt, with four council members. The city also operates a police department (which once housed prisoners in its WPA-era jail), and a municipal water system.

== Education ==
McRae became part of the Beebe School District on July 1, 2004, when the McRae School District merged into the Beebe district. Within McRae, Beebe Middle School serves fifth- and sixth-graders, who proceed to Beebe Junior High School in neighborhing Beebe.
