= Beebe High School =

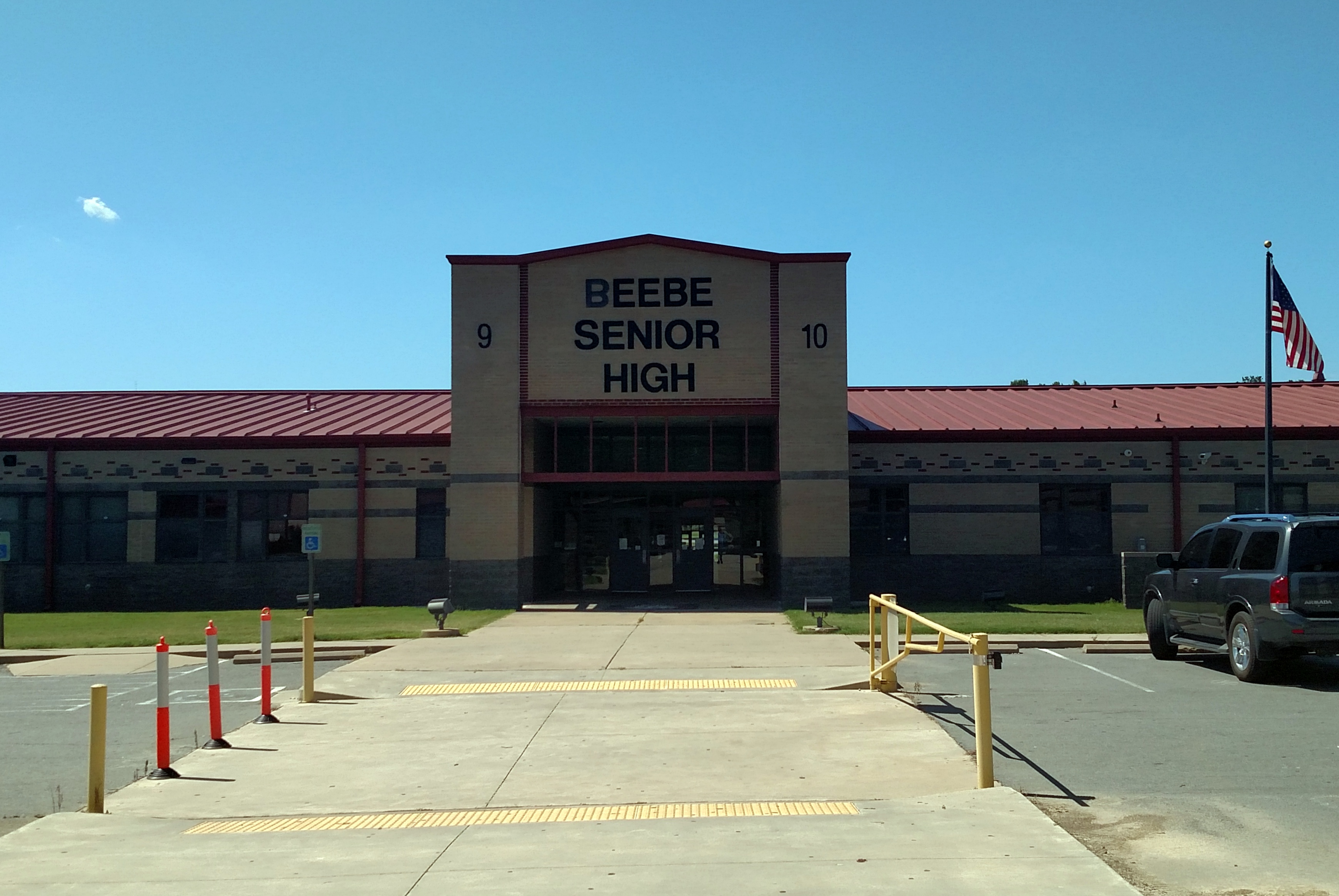

Location
- 1201 West Center St; Beebe, White County, Arkansas 72012; United States; 35°03′52″N 91°53′33″W

Information
- Status: Open
- School board: Beebe School Board
- School district: Beebe School District
- NCES District ID: 0502880
- Oversight: Arkansas Department of Education (ADE)
- CEEB code: 040145
- NCES School ID: 050288000057
- Grades: 9-12
- Enrollment: 1,055 (2023-2024)
- Student to teacher ratio: 8.21
- Education system: ADE Smart Core curriculum
- Classes offered: Regular, Advanced Placement
- Campus type: Urban
- Colors: Cardinal and white
- Athletics conference: 5A East (2012-14)
- Mascot: Badger
- Team name: Beebe Badgers
- Accreditation: AdvancED (1966-)
- Feeder schools: Beebe Junior High School (7-8)
- Affiliation: Arkansas Activities Association (AAA)
- Website: www.beebebadgers.org/o/high-school
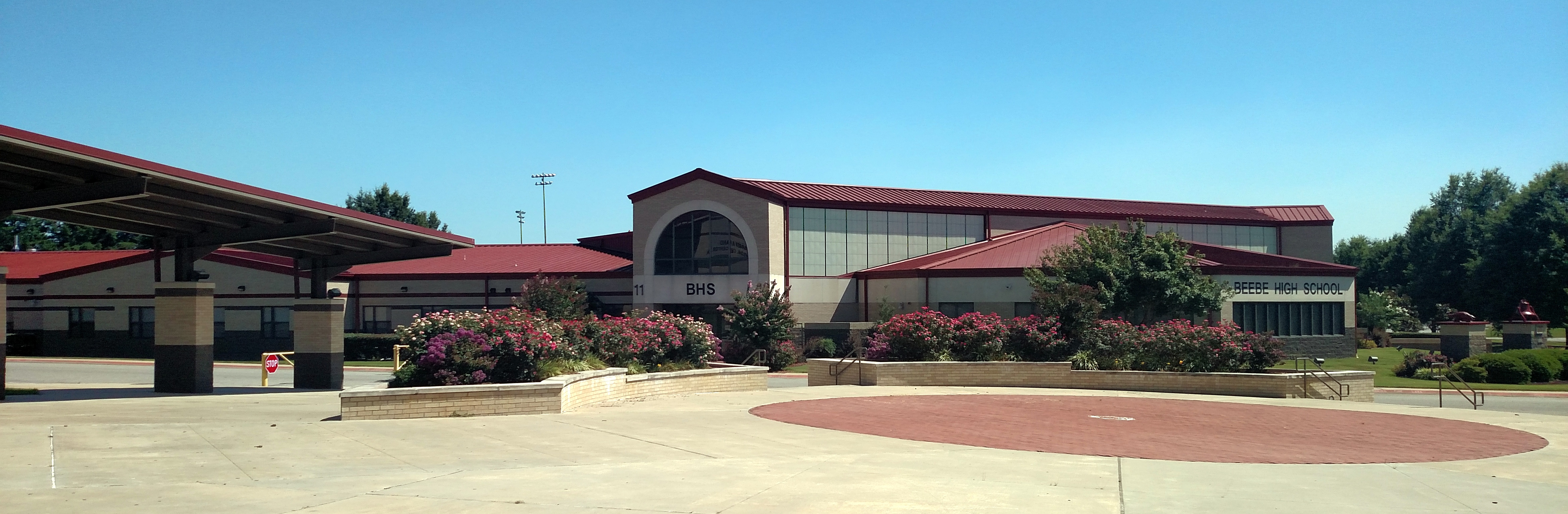

Beebe High School is a comprehensive public high school for students in grades nine through twelve located in Beebe, Arkansas, United States. It is one of eight public high schools in White County, Arkansas and is the only high school managed by the Beebe School District. It serves as the main feeder school for Beebe Junior High School.

== Curriculum ==
The assumed course of study at Beebe High School is the Smart Core curriculum developed by the Arkansas Department of Education. Students are engaged in regular and Advanced Placement (AP) coursework and exams prior to graduation, with the opportunity for qualified students to be named honor graduates based on grade point average and additional coursework above minimum requirements. Beebe High School has been accredited since 1966 by AdvancED.

== Performing arts ==
In 2012 and 2015, the Beebe High School Band won the Golden Mickey Award (Best in Class / superior rating) as the top band against 50 bands across the nation competing at the Festival Disney Awards competition at Walt Disney World Resort.

== Extracurricular activities ==
Beebe High School's mascot is the Badger and the school colors are cardinal red and white. Beebe High School is a member of the Arkansas Activities Association (AAA) and currently competes in the 5A Central Conference. For 2012–14, the Beebe Badgers participate in interscholastic competition including baseball, basketball (boys/girls), competitive cheer, competitive dance, cross country, football, golf (boys/girls), softball, tennis (boys/girls), track and field (boys/girls), volleyball and wrestling. Beebe High School's football and basketball games are carried on Searcy radio station KRZS (NewsTalk 99.1), 99.1 FM.

In 2010, Beebe High School won three state championships, weightlifting, bowling, and baseball. The baseball Badgers defeated Monticello High by a score of 6–2 in the Class 5A state championship game, which was played at Baum Stadium, located on the University of Arkansas campus in Fayetteville. In 2005–2006 school year, Beebe High School competed for two state championships in softball and cross country running. The Lady Badger softball team lost by a score of 2–1 to Vilonia High School, and the boys cross country team won the Class 5A meet, which was held in Hot Springs.

In total, Beebe High has won state championships in boys basketball (1941, 2013), boys cross country (1964, 1966, 1969, 2005), girls track (1998), weightlifting (2010), boys golf (2002), baseball (2010) and wrestling (2011). Beebe High's football team plays their home games at A.S. "Bro" Erwin Stadium, which was completed in 1985. Beebe High's basketball teams play their home games at Badger Sports Arena, which opened in 2001 and replaced the Beebe High gymnasium, which was destroyed in a tornado that hit the city of Beebe on January 21, 1999. Beebe High's baseball and softball teams play at the Gillam Fields complex, which are located on the east side of the Beebe School District's campus.

== Alumni ==
- Jonathan Dismang, state legislator including President of the Arkansas Senate
