= James Sturch =

American politician

Member of the Arkansas House of Representatives from the 63rd district
- In office January 12, 2015 – January 14, 2019
- Preceded by: James McLean
- Succeeded by: Stu Smith

Member of the Arkansas Senate from the 19th district
- In office January 14, 2019 – January 10, 2023
- Preceded by: Linda Collins
- Succeeded by: John Payton

Personal details
- Born: James Marvin Sturch; December 8, 1990 (age 35) Southside, Arkansas, U.S.
- Party: Republican
- Spouse: Macy Sturch
- Education: University of Arkansas at Little Rock (BA, MPA)

James Marvin Sturch (born December 8, 1990) is an American politician. He served as a Republican member for the 63rd district of the Arkansas House of Representatives and also the 19th district of the Arkansas Senate.

Sturch was born in Batesville, Arkansas. He attended the University of Arkansas at Little Rock, where he earned a Bachelor of Arts and a Master of Public Administration. In 2015, he was elected to represent the 63rd district in the Arkansas House of Representatives. Sturch succeeded James McLean. He served until 2019, when he was elected to the Arkansas Senate, succeeding Linda Collins. He ran for re-election in 2022, but he lost in a runoff for the Republican primary election.
