= Harmon Seawel =

American politician (1943–2025)

Member of the Arkansas House of Representatives
- In office January 11, 1999 – January 10, 2005
- Preceded by: Mike Davis
- Succeeded by: David Cook
- Constituency: 77th district (1999‍–‍2003); 80th district (2003‍–‍2005)

Personal details
- Born: Harmon Ray Seawel; May 5, 1943 Warm Springs, Arkansas, U.S.
- Died: November 30, 2025 (aged 82) Jonesboro, Arkansas, U.S.
- Party: Democratic
- Spouse: Susan Chester (m. 1973)
- Education: Crowley's Ridge College (AA); Harding University (BA); University of Mississippi (MA)
- Occupation: Educator; politician

Harmon Ray Seawel (May 5, 1943 – November 30, 2025) was an American politician who served as a member of the Arkansas House of Representatives from 1999 to 2005. A Democrat, he was the House's majority leader from 2001 to 2005.

Seawel died in Jonesboro, Arkansas, on November 30, 2025, at the age of 82.
