= David Wyatt (politician) =

American politician

David Wayne Wyatt

Member of the Arkansas Senate from the 19th district
- In office January 14, 2013 – January 2015
- Preceded by: Bill Sample
- Succeeded by: Linda Collins-Smith

Member of the Arkansas Senate from the 12th district
- In office January 2009 – January 14, 2013
- Preceded by: Jack Critcher
- Succeeded by: Bruce Maloch

Member of the Arkansas House of Representatives from the 72nd district
- In office January 2005 – January 2009
- Preceded by: Chaney Taylor
- Succeeded by: James McLean

Personal details
- Born: June 18, 1949
- Died: January 12, 2015 (aged 65)
- Party: Democratic

David Wayne Wyatt (June 18, 1949 – January 12, 2015) was an American farmer, judge, and politician from Batesville, Arkansas, who served as a Democrat in the Arkansas Senate for District 19 from January 14, 2013, to January 2015. Wyatt previously served in Senate District 12 from 2009 to 2013 and in the Arkansas House of Representatives for District 72 from 2005 to 2009.

== Political career ==
A farmer and rancher and a judge for two decades in Independence County, Wyatt first stood as a candidate in 2004 for House District 72, after Chaney Taylor left the legislature. He won the May 18, 2004 Democratic primary with 4,328 votes (77.5%) and was unopposed in the November 2, 2004 general election. In 2006 he was again unopposed in both the Democratic primary and the general election.

In 2008 he ran for the Arkansas Senate in District 12 after Jack Critcher left the legislature, leaving the seat open. He was unopposed in both the May 20, 2008 Democratic primary and the November 4, 2008 general election.

In 2012 Wyatt was redistricted to District 19, with Senator Bill Sample redistricted to District 14; Wyatt was unopposed in the May 22, 2012 Democratic primary and was elected in the November 6 general election, with 15,442 votes (51.2 percent) against Republican nominee Linda Collins-Smith, who two years later was elected as his Senate successor after he declined to seek reelection.

== Personal life and death ==
Wyatt and his wife, Deborah, had two children. After undergoing cancer treatment, he died on January 12, 2015, aged 65.
