= Bill Alexander (American politician) =

American retired politician in Arkansas

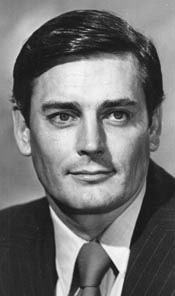

House Democratic Chief Deputy Whip
- In office January 3, 1981 – January 3, 1987
- Leader: Tip O'Neill
- Preceded by: Dan Rostenkowski
- Succeeded by: David Bonior

Member of the U.S. House of Representatives from Arkansas's 1st district
- In office January 3, 1969 – January 3, 1993
- Preceded by: Ezekiel C. Gathings
- Succeeded by: Blanche Lincoln

Personal details
- Born: William Vollie Alexander Jr. January 16, 1934 (age 92) Memphis, Tennessee, U.S.
- Party: Democratic
- Spouse(s): Gwen Haven; Debi Drury
- Education: University of Arkansas; Rhodes College (BA); Vanderbilt University (LLB)

Military service
- Branch/service: United States Army
- Years of service: 1953–1955
- Rank: Captain
- Unit: Army Judge Advocate General's Corps

William Vollie Alexander Jr. (born January 16, 1934) is an American retired politician who represented the U.S. state of Arkansas in the United States House of Representatives from 1969 to 1993, rising to the post of Chief Deputy Majority Whip.

== Early life and education ==
Alexander was born in Memphis, Tennessee to Spencer (née Buck) and William Vollie Alexander He grew up in Osceola, Arkansas, graduating from Osceola High School in 1951, and became an Eagle Scout the same year.

He attended the University of Arkansas at Fayetteville, where he was a member of Kappa Sigma fraternity, before earning a Bachelor of Arts degree from Southwestern at Memphis University (now Rhodes College) in 1957 and a Bachelor of Laws degree from Vanderbilt University Law School in Nashville in 1960.

== Career ==
He subsequently clerked for Judge Marion S. Boyd of the United States District Court for the Western District of Tennessee. He served in the U.S. Army JAG Corps.

Alexander practiced law in Memphis and Osceola, was a commissioner on the Arkansas Waterways Commission, and secretary of the Osceola Port Authority.

=== Congress ===
He was elected as a Democrat from Arkansas's 1st congressional district in 1968, succeeding thirty-year incumbent Ezekiel C. "Took" Gathings, who retired, and would subsequently be reelected eleven additional times. In the House, he served in the Democratic leadership as Chief Deputy Majority Whip from 1981 to 1987, and was a member of the House Appropriations Committee, where he was active on issues involving agriculture, energy and foreign trade.

In 1992, the Arkansas Democrat-Gazette published a story accusing Alexander of misusing campaign funds, although these transactions were later found to be legal. Nonetheless, he was defeated for re-nomination by a wide margin by Blanche Lambert (later to be known as Blanche Lincoln), a former staff assistant to Alexander, who went on to win the general election in November.

=== Retirement ===
Alexander and his wife, Debi Alexander, today live in Reston, Virginia.

U.S. House of Representatives
Preceded by Ezekiel C. Gathings	Member of the U.S. House of Representatives from Arkansas's 1st congressional district 1969–1993	Succeeded by Blanche Lincoln
Party political offices
Preceded by Dan Rostenkowski	House Democratic Chief Deputy Whip; 1981–1987	Succeeded by David Bonior
U.S. order of precedence (ceremonial)
Preceded by John Shimkus as Former U.S. Representative	Order of precedence of the United States as Former U.S. Representative	Succeeded by Dave Camp as Former U.S. Representative
