= Charles Beckham =

American politician

Member of the Arkansas Senate from the 12th district
- In office January 11, 2021 – January 9, 2023
- Preceded by: Bruce Maloch
- Succeeded by: Steve Crowell (redistricting)

Personal details
- Party: Republican
- Education: Mississippi State University

Charles Beckham is an American politician who served in the Arkansas Senate from the 12th district. A member of the Republican Party, he won election to the seat in 2020, defeating Democratic incumbent Bruce Maloch 55.9% to 44.1%. Running for reelection in the newly-drawn 3rd district in 2022, he was defeated in the Republican primary by Magnolia City Council member Steve Crowell, who went on to win the general election.
