= James McLean (Arkansas politician) =

American politician

Member of the Arkansas House of Representatives from the 63rd district
- In office January 14, 2013 – January 2015
- Preceded by: Denny Altes
- Succeeded by: James Sturch

Member of the Arkansas House of Representatives from the 72nd district
- In office January 2009 – January 14, 2013
- Preceded by: David Wyatt
- Succeeded by: Stephen Magie

Personal details
- Party: Democratic
- Education: Arkansas State University; University of the Ozarks

James McLean is an American politician and a Democratic former member of the Arkansas House of Representatives who represented District 63 from 2013 to 2015. McLean served consecutively from January 2009 until January 2013 in the District 72 seat.

== Education ==
McLean attended Arkansas State University and the University of the Ozarks.

== Elections ==
- 2012 Redistricted to District 63, with Representative Denny Altes redistricted to District 76, McLean was unopposed for the May 22, 2012 Democratic Primary and won the November 6, 2012 General election with 6,872 votes (69.6%) against Republican nominee Charlie Fuqua.
- 2008 Initially in District 72, when David Wyatt ran for Arkansas Senate and left the seat open, McLean won the May 20, 2008 Democratic Primary by 67 votes with 2,164 votes (50.8%) and was unopposed for the November 4, 2008 General election.
- 2010 McLean was unopposed for both the May 18, 2010 Democratic Primary and the November 2, 2010 General election.
