= Jack Critcher =

American politician

President pro tempore of the Arkansas Senate
- In office January 2007 – January 2009
- Preceded by: Jim Argue
- Succeeded by: Bob Johnson

Member of the Arkansas Senate
- In office January 11, 1999 – January 2009
- Preceded by: Tom Kennedy
- Succeeded by: David Wyatt
- Constituency: 24th district (1999–2003); 12th district (2003–2009)

Member of the Arkansas House of Representatives from the 89th district
- In office January 9, 1995 – January 11, 1999
- Succeeded by: Wayne Nichols

Personal details
- Born: Batesville, Arkansas, U.S.
- Party: Democratic
- Spouse: Vickie Ann

Jack L. Critcher is a former politician in Arkansas. He served as a state legislator in the Arkansas House of Representatives and Arkansas Senate. He also served as the President of the Arkansas Senate.

Critcher lives in Batesville, Arkansas and has served as mayor, alderman, and as a school board member as well as in the Arkansas House in 1995 and 1997 and in the Arkansas Senate in 1999, 2001, 2003, 2005, and 2007.
