= McRae School District =

Defunct school district in Arkansas, United States

McRae School District No. 8 was a school district headquartered in McRae, Arkansas.

On July 1, 2004, it merged into the Beebe School District.
