= Joseph H. Bradford =

American politician

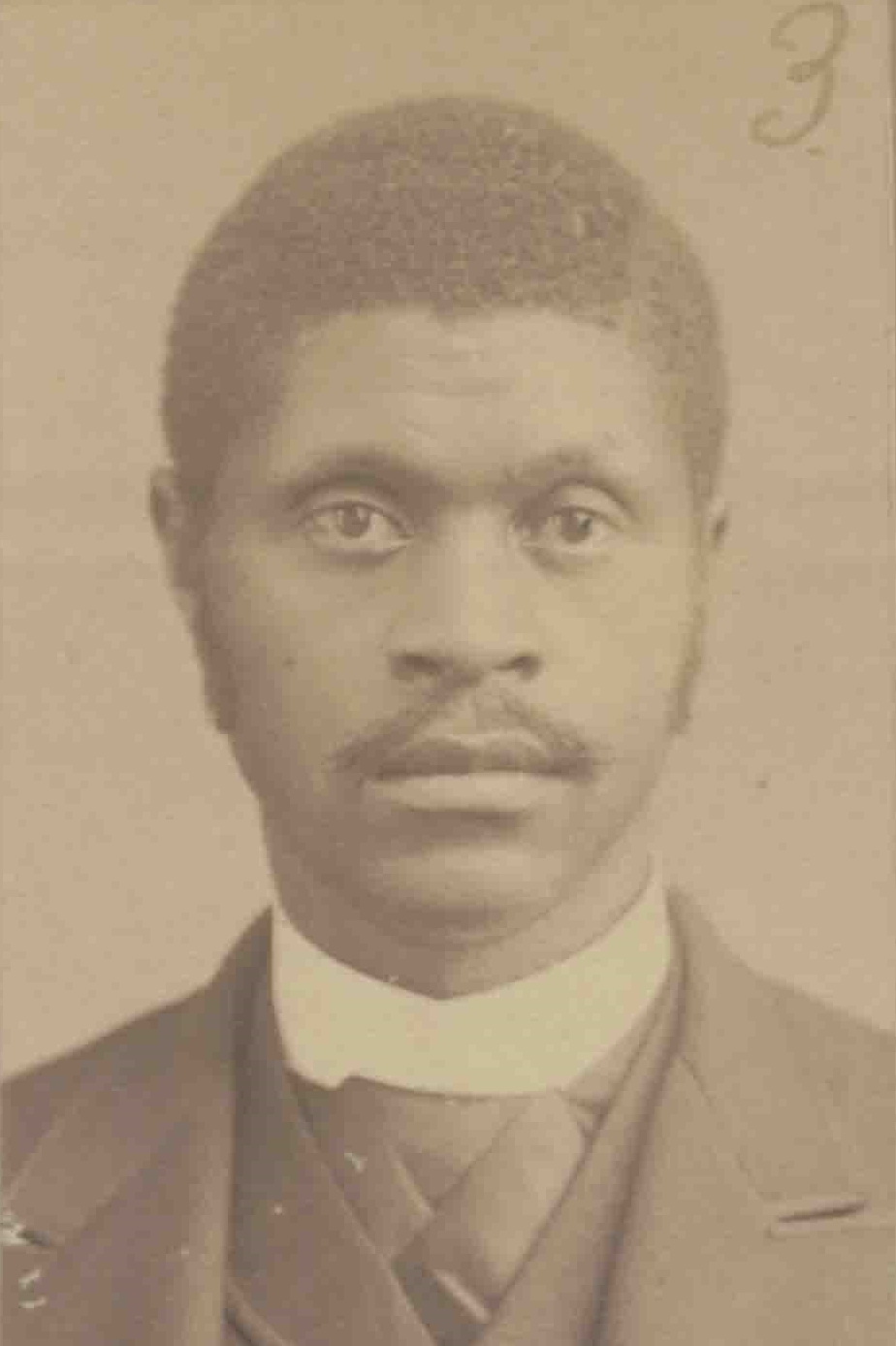

Arkansas House of Representatives
- In office 1885–1885

Personal details
- Born: 1854 Tennessee
- Died: Unknown
- Party: Republican

1885 House of Representatives composite photo of the Twenty-Fifth General Assembly of the State of Arkansas

Joseph H. Bradford (born c. 1854) was a teacher, lawyer, and state legislator in Arkansas. He served in the Arkansas House of Representatives in 1885. He was a Republican. His photograph is among those of his fellow 1885 Arkansas House members. He represented Mississippi County.

He was born in Tennessee. According to the House photograph's captioning, he was a lawyer, 29, Republican, born in Tennessee and had lived in Arkansas for 17 years, and his post office was in Osceola, Arkansas.

== See also ==
- African American officeholders from the end of the Civil War until before 1900
