= Osceola School District (Arkansas) =

School district in Arkansas, United States

Location
- 2750 West Semmes; Osceola, Arkansas 72730 United States

District information
- Grades: PK–12
- Accreditation: Arkansas Department of Education
- Schools: 6
- NCES District ID: 0510950

Students and staff
- Students: 1,464
- Teachers: 117.67 (on FTE basis)
- Staff: 265.67 (on FTE basis)
- Student–teacher ratio: 12.44
- Athletic conference: 1A 7 West (2012–14)
- District mascot: Seminole
- Colors: Purple Gold

Other information
- Website: www.osd1.org

Osceola School District is a public school district based in Osceola, Arkansas, United States. The Osceola School District provides early childhood, elementary and secondary education for more than 1,450 prekindergarten through grade 12 students at its four facilities.

The school district encompasses 49.33 square miles (127.8 km^{2}) of land in Mississippi County, Arkansas, serving the most of Osceola.

Osceola School District and its schools are accredited by the Arkansas Department of Education (ADE). All middle and high schools participate in the 3A Region 3 Conference as sanctioned by the Arkansas Activities Association.

== Location ==
The Rivercrest School District (formerly the South Mississippi County School District) surrounds the Osceola district on the sides other than the river.

== Demographics ==
From 2005 to 2011, the district's number of students declined by 13%.

== Schools ==
- Osceola High School—serving more than 330 students in grades 9 through 12.
- Osceola STEM Academy —serving more than 350 students in grades 5 through 8.
  - Previously Osceola Middle School. As of 2011, the highest percentage of students achieving at least competency in state literacy examination was 40%. Since 2005 the highest percentage of students passing the state mathematics examinations was below 30%. A 2011 report in the Arkansas Legislature stated that the school had not made recent progress and that it was "one of the lowest performing schools in Arkansas". It was a grade 7-9 school until 2006, when it became a 6-8 school.
  - The enrollment began to decline when charter schools opened in the district. In the 2004–2005 school year, it had 287 students. The following school year it was down to 212, something the legislative report credits to the grade configuration change. From 2005 to 2011 the number of students declined by 45.6%. In the 2009–2010 school year, the student population declined by more than 14% because of the opening of a second charter school. In 2011 Osceola Middle had 150 students, with 95.5% being African-American, 4.5% white, and 98% eligible for school meals at a reduced price or no price at all.
- According to Osceola School District staff, many of the white students in the district attended Osceola Academic Center of Excellence instead of the zoned middle school, and the 2011 legislative report stated that a staff member "indicated" that a few white middle school students resident in the Osceola district may be attending the middle school section of Rivercrest High School of the Rivercrest district using addresses that do not reflect their true locations.
- Carroll Smith Elementary School—serving more than 400 students in grades 1 through 4; formerly West Ełementary School prior to August 2012.
- North Elementary School—serving more than 175 students in prekindergarten and kindergarten.
