= Special routes of U.S. Route 67 =

Special routes of U.S. Route 67

Highway system
- United States Numbered Highway System; List; Special; Divided

Numerous special routes of U.S. Route 67, all business routes, exist. One other route, formerly an alternate route in western Illinois, has since been downgraded to state Route 267.

== Texas ==
All of the business routes within Texas are maintained by the Texas Department of Transportation (TxDOT). U.S. Route 67 has seven current and two former business routes within the state, with two of these located in San Angelo. Along US 67, TxDOT identifies each business route as Business U.S. Highway 67 followed by an alphabetic suffix. Along Texas U.S. routes, the alphabetic suffixes on business route names ascend generally eastward and southward. As US 67 is labeled as a west-to-east route, its initial business loop in Presidio is suffixed with an A. There are gaps in the alphabetic values that allow for future system expansion or decommissioned routes. The alphabetic naming suffixes are included as small letters at the bottom of route shields.

=== Presidio business loop ===
Business U.S. Highway 67-A
- Location: Presidio, Texas
- Length: 1.798 mi (2.894 km)
- Existed: 1996–present

Business U.S. Highway 67-A or Bus. US 67-A is a business loop of US 67 at Presidio in Presidio County commissioned in 1996. The 1.8-mile (2.9 km) route begins at US 67 west of town near the Presidio-Ojinaga International Bridge and proceeds along O'Reilly Street to Farm to Market Road 170. The route then turns north along Erma Street to State Spur 203. The route then turns west and rejoins US 67 north of town.

Much of the route, along with SS 203 and the former SS 310, was the former route of US 67 through town before the present US 67 was constructed to bypass the town to the northwest in 1996.

Major intersections

The entire route is in Presidio, Presidio County.

mi	km	Destinations	Notes
0.0	0.0	US 67 south – Ojinaga (Chihuahua) US 67 north – Bus. US 67, Marfa	Southern terminus T intersection
0.3	0.48	FM 170 east (O'Reilly Street) – Redford, Lajitas	Southern end of FM 170 concurrency; T intersection
0.9	1.4	Spur 203 north (Erma Avenue)	Y intersection; former routing of US 67 / FM 170
1.8	2.9	US 67 north / FM 170 west – Marfa, Ruidosa US 67 south – Bus. US 67, Ojinaga (Chihuahua)	Northern terminus; northern end of FM 180 concurrency; T intersection
1.000 mi = 1.609 km; 1.000 km = 0.621 mi: Concurrency terminus

=== San Angelo business loop (west) ===
Business U.S. Highway 67-H
- Location: San Angelo, Texas
- Length: 4.345 mi (6.993 km)
- Existed: 1996–present

Business U.S. Highway 67-H or Bus. US 67-H is a business loop of US 67 at San Angelo in Tom Green County commissioned in 1996. The certified mileage of the 5.0-mile (8.0 km) route, one of two business loops within San Angelo, does not include portions concurrent with US 87 and US 277. From US 67 and State Highway Loop 306 west of town, the route follows Sherwood Way and Beauregard Avenue eastward to US 87 and US 277. The route then overlays US 87 and US 277 along Abe Street (southbound) and Koenigheim Street (northbound) to US 67.

The portion of the business loop over Sherwood Way and Beauregard Avenue was part of the former route of US 67 before the completion of the Houston Harte Expressway in 1984. Between 1984 and 1996, this portion was designated as part of Loop 545.

Major intersections

The entire route is in San Angelo, Tom Green County.

mi	km	Destinations	Notes
0.0	0.0	US 67 (Houston Harte Expressway) / Loop 306 – Big Lake	Southern terminus
4.3	6.9	US 87 south / US 277 south (Abe Street) – Eden, Eldorado	
4.5	7.2	US 87 north / US 277 north (Koenigheim Drive)	Begin overlay of US 87 and US 277
5.0	8.0	US 67 / US 87 north / US 277 north (Houston Harte Expressway) – Ballinger, Sterling City, Bronte	Northern terminus, end overlay of US 87 and US 277
1.000 mi = 1.609 km; 1.000 km = 0.621 mi

=== San Angelo business loop (east) ===
Business U.S. Highway 67-J
- Location: San Angelo, Texas
- Length: 3.014 mi (4.851 km)
- Existed: 1996–present

Business U.S. Highway 67-J or Bus. US 67-J is a business loop of US 67 at San Angelo in Tom Green County commissioned in 1996. The certified mileage of the 3.7-mile (6.0 km) route, one of two business loops within San Angelo, does not include portions concurrent with Loop 306. From US 67 in central San Angelo, the route follows Main Street south to Pulliam Street. The route then follows Pulliam Street east to Loop 306 and then overlays Loop 306 north to US 67. The business loop also has major intersections with US 277 and FM 380.

The portion of the business loop over Pulliam Street west of Ball Street was part of the former route of US 67 before the completion of the Houston Harte Expressway in 1984. Between 1984 and 1986, the Main Street portion was designated as part of Loop 545.

Major intersections

The entire route is in San Angelo, Tom Green County.

mi	km	Destinations	Notes
0.0	0.0	US 67 / US 277 (Houston Harte Expressway) – Big Lake, Eldorado	Southern terminus
3.0	4.8	Loop 306 / FM 380	Begin overlay of Loop 306
3.7	6.0	US 67 / US 277 (Houston Harte Expressway) / Loop 306 – Ballinger, Bronte	Northern terminus, end overlay of Loop 306
1.000 mi = 1.609 km; 1.000 km = 0.621 mi

=== Dublin business loop ===
Business U.S. Highway 67-K
- Location: Dublin, Texas
- Length: 4.6 mi (7.4 km)
- Existed: 2001–present

Business U.S. Highway 67-K or Bus. US 67-K is a business loop of US 67 at Dublin in Erath County commissioned in 2001. The business loop was designated over a 4.6-mile (7.4 km) segment of the current US 67 and US 377 known locally as Patrick Street through Dublin in anticipation of future construction of a new alignment for US 67 and US 377 bypassing Dublin. The route so far maintains its designation even though the proposed bypass route was reassigned with a new designation as State Highway 267 in 2012. The route has major intersections with SH 6 and FM 219.

Major intersections

The entire route is in Erath County.

Location	mi	km	Destinations	Notes
	0.0	0.0	US 67 / US 377 – Comanche	Southern terminus
Dublin	3.0	4.8	SH 6 / FM 219 south (Blackjack Street) – DeLeon, Hico, Cranfills Gap	Begin overlay of FM 219
Dublin	3.8	6.1	FM 219 (Clinton Street) – Lingleville	End overlay of FM 219
	4.6	7.4	US 67 / US 377 – Stephenville	Northern terminus
1.000 mi = 1.609 km; 1.000 km = 0.621 mi

=== Cleburne business loop ===
Business U.S. Highway 67-M
- Location: Cleburne, Texas–Keene, Texas
- Length: 7.757 mi (12.484 km)
- Existed: 1996–present

Business U.S. Highway 67-M or Bus. US 67-M is a business route of US 67 at Cleburne and Keene in Johnson County commissioned in 1996. The 8.1-mile (13.0 km) route begins at US 67 west of Cleburne and follows along Henderson Street to central Cleburne. In central Cleburne between Walnut Street and Border Street, the roadway divides onto two one-way streets one block from each other with northbound traffic circulating along Chambers Street while southbound traffic continues along Henderson Street Along this portion, the route intersects SH 171 and SH 174. The route then continues along Henderson Street through Cleburne and then enters Keene. The route intersects FM 2280 before terminating at US 67 and Spur 102.

The route follows the former route of US 67 before US 67 was relocated around Cleburne in 1996 replacing the former Loop 367.

Major intersections

The entire route is in Johnson County.

Location	mi	km	Destinations	Notes
Cleburne	0.0	0.0	US 67 – Glen Rose	Southern terminus
Cleburne	3.9	6.3	SH 171 south / SH 174 south (Main Street) – Covington, Meridian	
Cleburne	3.9	6.3	SH 171 north / SH 174 north (Caddo Street) – Godley, Burleson	
Keene	7.4	11.9	FM 2280 – Egan	
Keene	8.1	13.0	US 67 / Spur 102 – Alvarado	Northern terminus
1.000 mi = 1.609 km; 1.000 km = 0.621 mi

=== Alvarado business loop ===
Business U.S. Highway 67-N
- Location: Alvarado, Texas
- Length: 1.202 mi (1.934 km)
- Existed: 1990–present

Business U.S. Highway 67-N or Bus. US 67-N is a business route of US 67 at Alvarado in Johnson County, commissioned in 1990. The 1.2-mile (1.9 km) route begins at Bus. I-35-V and follows College Street to FM 1706. The route then curves northward joining, Baugh Street until it terminates at US 67.

The route follows part of the former location of US 67 through town before 1963. The route was designated Spur 379 from 1963 to 1990, although it was signed as Bus. US 67.

Major intersections

The entire route is in Alvarado, Johnson County.

mi	km	Destinations	Notes
0.0	0.0	I-35 BL (Parkway Road) – Hillsboro, Fort Worth	Southern terminus
0.4	0.64	FM 1706 (Sparks Street)	
1.2	1.9	US 67 (Henderson Street) – Cleburne, Dallas	Northern terminus
1.000 mi = 1.609 km; 1.000 km = 0.621 mi

=== Sulphur Springs business loop ===
Business U.S. Highway 67-V
- Location: Sulphur Springs, Texas
- Length: 6.469 mi (10.411 km)
- Existed: 1990–present

Business U.S. Highway 67-V or Bus. US 67-V is a business route of US 67 at Sulphur Springs in Hopkins County commissioned in 1990. The certified mileage of the 6.6-mile (10.6 km) route does not include portions concurrent with SH 11 and SH 154. The route begins at Exit 120 of Interstate 30 and US 67 west of town and proceeds northeastward along Main Street. The route intersects SH 19 on Sulphur Springs' west side and continues along Main Street to Davis Street in central Sulphur Springs. From this point, the route follows College Street and then merges with SH 11 and SH 154 along two one-way streets with northbound traffic circulating on Oak Avenue and southbound traffic using Gilmer Street. After one block, the route turns east onto Jefferson Street ending the overlay of SH 11 and SH 154, and the route continues along Jefferson Street to Jackson Street. Jefferson Street resumes a short distance to the north, and the route follows Jefferson Street to its terminus at Loop 301.

The route largely follows the former route of US 67 through town before September 19, 1956. That same day, US 67 was designated as a bypass around town. The former route through town was designated as FM 164 west of SH 19 to US 67 west of town and as Texas State Highway Loop 313 east of SH 19 to US 67 east of town and along SH 19 reconnecting the loop to US 67. Loop 313 was not signed as such, but instead was signed as Bus. US 67. On April 27, 1967, the designation of the portion of Loop 313 over SH 19 was canceled and FM 164 was decommissioned and combined with Loop 313 as an extension. FM 164 has since been reused elsewhere. On November 16, 1987, the route of Loop 313 through downtown Sulphur Springs was modified, and the route's northern terminus was changed to Loop 301. The route's designation was changed from Loop 313 to Bus. US 67-V on June 21, 1990.

Major intersections

The entire route is in Hopkins County.

Location	mi	km	Destinations	Notes
	0.0	0.0	I-30 / US 67 – Greenville, Mount Pleasant	I-30 exit 120; southern terminus.
Sulphur Springs	2.8	4.5	SH 19 (Hillcrest Drive) – Emory, Paris	
Sulphur Springs	4.5	7.2	SH 11 east / SH 154 east (Gilmer Street) – Winnsboro, Quitman	One-way street—westbound traffic circulates one block east on Oak Avenue where Bus. US 67-V begins overlay
Sulphur Springs	4.6	7.4	SH 11 west / SH 154 west (Jefferson Street) – Commerce, Cooper	End overlay of SH 11 and SH 154
Sulphur Springs	6.6	10.6	Loop 301	Northern terminus
1.000 mi = 1.609 km; 1.000 km = 0.621 mi

== Arkansas ==
=== Beebe business route ===
U.S. Highway 67B
- Location: Beebe, Arkansas
- Length: 3.61 mi (5.81 km)
- Existed: 1974–present

U.S. Route 67 Business (US 67B, Hwy. 67B) is a 3.61-mile (5.81 km) business route of US 67 in White County, Arkansas. The route begins at Interstate 57 (I-57) in west Beebe and runs east to I-57 where it continues as Highway 31.

The highway begins at I-57/US 64/US 67/US 167 in west Beebe and runs east. US 67B intersects Arkansas Highway 367, which is a former alignment of US 67 before entering downtown Beebe. The special route passes the Sellers House, Colonel Ralph Andrews House, and the Beebe Railroad Station (each listed on the National Register of Historic Places) before intersecting Highway 31. The routes concur north, becoming Main Street, passing near the Beebe Theater, Staggs-Huffaker Building, Powell Clothing Store, Laws-Jarvis House, and the Smith-Moore House. The road is entirely two-lane undivided.

The route was first US 64, and later became US 64 City. In 1974, the route was redesignated as US 67B following the building of the US 67/US 167 bypass in the area. Since US 64 was part of the bypass, the US 64B designation no longer made sense.

Major intersections

The entire route is in Beebe, White County.

mi	km	Destinations	Notes
0.00	0.00	I-57 / US 64 / US 67 / US 167	Southern terminus
0.20	0.32	AR 367 (Dewitt Henry Drive)	Former US 67
1.93	3.11	AR 31 south (Main Street)	South end of AR 31 overlap
2.66	4.28	AR 367 (Dewitt Henry Drive)	Former US 67
3.61	5.81	I-57 / US 64 / US 67 / US 167	Exit 31 on I-57
3.61	5.81	AR 31 north	Continuation north; north end of AR 31 overlap
1.000 mi = 1.609 km; 1.000 km = 0.621 mi: Concurrency terminus

=== Searcy business route ===
U.S. Highway 67B
- Location: Searcy, Arkansas
- Length: 6.19 mi (9.96 km)

U.S. Route 67 Business (US 67B, Hwy. 67B) is a 6.19-mile (9.96 km) business route of US 67 in White County, Arkansas. The route begins at Interstate 57 (I-57) in south Searcy and runs north to terminate at I-57.

The highway begins as a continuation of Highway 367 at I-57/US 64/US 67/US 167 in south Searcy and runs north. The special route continues north to intersect Highway 36 near the Rascoe House, which is listed on the National Register of Historic Places. US 67B runs north to a junction with Highway 16 near the First United Methodist Church. The junction is the eastern terminus of Highway 16, and US 67B turns right to run due east as Race Avenue. Running east, the route passes historically significant structures such as the Tom Watkins House, William H. Lightle House, Lightle House, Wilburn House, Watkins House, and Arthur W. Hoofman House while also passing just north of Harding University. The route terminates at I-57/US 64/US 67/US 167, where it continues as Highway 36.

Major intersections

The entire route is in Searcy, White County.

mi	km	Destinations	Notes
0.0	0.0	AR 367 south	Continuation south
0.0	0.0	I-57 / US 64 / US 67 / US 167	
1.59	2.56	AR 367 east (Booth Road)	Western terminus of AR 367; former US 67
2.66– 2.70	4.28– 4.35	AR 267 (Lincoln Avenue)	Officially designated exception
3.00	4.83	AR 36 (Beebe Capps Expressway)	
3.46	5.57	AR 16 west (Race Avenue)	Western terminus of AR 16
6.19	9.96	I-57 / US 64 / US 67 / US 167	
6.19	9.96	AR 36 east	Continuation east
1.000 mi = 1.609 km; 1.000 km = 0.621 mi: Concurrency terminus

=== Walnut Ridge business route ===
U.S. Highway 67B
- Location: Walnut Ridge, Arkansas
- Length: 2.17 mi (3.49 km)
- Existed: c. 2000–present

U.S. Route 67 Business (US 67B, Hwy. 67B) is a 2.17-mile (3.49 km) business route of US 67 in Lawrence County, Arkansas. The route begins at US 412B in Walnut Ridge and runs north to terminate at US 67.

After Highway 367 takes over the southern portion of the route, US 67B starts at junction with US 412B. The route runs through a few blocks of residential properties before becoming a rural route. The route terminates at US 67.

Major intersections

The entire route is in Walnut Ridge, Lawrence County.

mi	km	Destinations	Notes
0.00	0.00	US 412B (Main Street)	
2.17	3.49	US 67	Northern terminus
1.000 mi = 1.609 km; 1.000 km = 0.621 mi: Concurrency terminus

=== Walnut Ridge connector route ===
U.S. Highway 67Y
- Location: Walnut Ridge, Arkansas
- Length: 0.43 mi (690 m)

U.S. Highway 67Y is a 0.43-mile (0.69 km) connector route in Lawrence County, Arkansas. Posted as US 67Y, it runs from US 67 south to State Highway 34. This route is about 1.25-mile (2.01 km) northeast of Walnut Ridge, Arkansas.

=== Biggers business route ===
U.S. Highway 67B
- Location: Biggers, Arkansas
- Length: 0.65 mi (1,050 m)

U.S. Route 67 Business is a 0.65-mile (1.05 km) business route in Randolph County, Arkansas. Posted as US 67B, its southern terminus is at U.S. Highway 62 and U.S. Highway 67 (Future Interstate 57). The route runs north to Biggers/Reyno Road (a former alignment of U.S. Route 67) in downtown Biggers, where it terminates.

=== Datto business route ===
U.S. Highway 67B
- Location: Datto, Arkansas
- Length: 0.23 mi (370 m)

U.S. Highway 67 Business is a 0.23-mile (0.37 km) business route in Clay County, Arkansas. Posted as US 67B, it runs from US 67 (Future I-57) west to 1st Street.

== Missouri ==
=== Poplar Bluff business loop ===
U.S. Route 67 Business
- Location: Poplar Bluff, Missouri

=== Fredericktown business loop ===
U.S. Route 67 Business
- Location: Fredericktown, Missouri

=== Leadington–Park Hills business loop ===
U.S. Route 67 Business
- Location: Leadington–Park Hills, Missouri

== Missouri–Illinois ==
=== St. Louis–Alton alternate route ===
U.S. Route 67 Alternate
- Location: Mehlville, Missouri–Alton, Illinois
- Existed: 1939–1964

U.S. Route 67 Alternate (US 67 Alt.) was an alternate route of US 67. US 67 Alt was formed in 1939 after US 67 moved away from East St. Louis. It initially followed from the western approach of the Municipal Bridge (now the MacArthur Bridge) to Alton. By 1953, the alternate route was extended as US 67 moved onto the inner bypass (previously Route 99). In 1958, US 67 moved onto parts of present-day Route 21 and Route 30. As a result, the alternate route expanded south to Lindbergh Boulevard. It eventually got decommissioned in 1964. As a result of this, Route 267 and IL 203 formed.

== Illinois ==
=== Jacksonville business loop ===
U.S. Route 67 Business
- Location: Jacksonville, Illinois

=== Roseville business loop ===
U.S. Route 67 Business
- Location: Roseville, Illinois

=== Godfrey–Murrayville alternate route ===
U.S. Route 67 Alternate
- Location: Godfrey–Murrayville, Illinois
- Existed: 1953–1965

In 1953, US 67 was rerouted to travel straight to Jacksonville through Medora. The former alignment of US 67 (which ran through Jerseyville) was then signed as US 67 Alt. In 1965, the alternate route was decommissioned and was changed to Illinois Route 267. In 2001, both designations (US 67 and IL 267) were swapped as a result of the construction of Jacksonville's western bypass. US 67 was rerouted again in 2005 after the bypass was finished.

== Former ==
=== Midlothian business loop ===
Business U.S. Highway 67-Q
- Location: Midlothian, Texas
- Length: 2.3 mi (3.7 km)
- Existed: 1990–2006

Business U.S. Highway 67-Q, or Bus. US 67-Q was a business loop of US 67 at Midlothian in Ellis County from 1990 until 2006. The 2.3-mile (3.7 km) route began at US 67 south of town and went northwest until it merged with Fifth Street. The route then followed Fifth Street to Bus. US 287-Q known locally as Main Street. The route then turned east and followed the bus. US 287-Q for three blocks, then turned north on Eighth Street. The route then followed Eighth Street through an intersection with FM 1387 until it terminated at US 67 north of town.

The route followed the former route of US 67 through town before 1970. Between 1970 and 1990, the route was designated as Loop 489 but was signed as Bus. US 67. Since 2006, the portion from Bus. US 287-Q south to US 67 has been designated as Spur 73 while the portion along Eighth Street has been removed from the state highway system and returned to the city of Midlothian for control and maintenance.

=== Greenville business spur ===
Business U.S. Highway 67-T
- Location: Greenville, Texas
- Length: 2.1 mi (3.4 km)
- Existed: 1990–2001

Business U.S. Highway 67-T, or Bus. US 67-T was a business loop of US 67 at Greenville in Hunt County from 1990 until 2001. The 2.1-mile (3.4 km) route began at a junction with Bus. US 69-D, SH 34, and SH 224 and followed Lee Street east to I-30 and US 67 at Exit 96. There were no major highway intersections between the route's termini.

The route was part of the former route of US 67 through Greenville before US 67 was rerouted over I-30. At that time, the route was designated as part of Loop 302 until 1990. When Bus. US 67-T was decommissioned in 2001; the route was then designated as part of Spur 302.

=== Reyno business route ===
U.S. Highway 67B
- Location: Reyno, Arkansas
- Formed: yes

==== Little Rock eastern route ====
U.S. Highway 67E
- Location: Little Rock, Arkansas
- Length: 4 mi (6.4 km)
- Existed: 1935–1960

=== Little Rock western route ===
U.S. Highway 67W
- Location: Little Rock, Arkansas
- Length: 8 mi (13 km)
- Existed: 1935–1960

=== Morning Sun–Judsonia eastern route ===
U.S. Highway 67E
- Location: Morning Sun, Arkansas-Judsonia, Arkansas
- Existed: 1931–1949

=== Morning Sun–Judsonia western route ===
U.S. Highway 67W
- Location: Morning Sun, Arkansas-Judsonia, Arkansas
- Existed: 1931–1949

=== Arkadelphia–Donaldson eastern route ===
U.S. Highway 67E
- Location: Arkadelphia, Arkansas-Donaldson, Arkansas
- Existed: 1931–1932

=== Arkadelphia–Donaldson western route ===
U.S. Highway 67W
- Location: Arkadelphia, Arkansas-Donaldson, Arkansas
- Existed: 1931–1932

=== St. Louis bypass ===
U.S. Route 67 Bypass
- Location: Mehlville–Old Jamestown, Missouri
- Existed: 1938–1967

U.S. Route 67 Bypass (US 67 Byp.) was a bypass route of US 67. From 1938 to 1958, US 67 Bypass used to travel from Mehlville to Old Jamestown via Lindbergh Boulevard. After 1958, it got truncated as US 67 was rerouted onto a different route in St. Louis. It was decommissioned in 1967. Since 1975, US 67 followed along Lindbergh Boulevard and still remains to this day.

== See also ==
- List of special routes of the United States Numbered Highway System
