= Lightle House =

Lightle House may refer to:

- Ben Lightle House (301 East Market Avenue, Searcy, Arkansas) listed on the National Register of Historic Places (NRHP) in White County, Arkansas
- Lightle House (107 North Elm Street, Searcy, Arkansas), NRHP-listed in White County, Arkansas
- Lightle House (605 Race Avenue, Searcy, Arkansas), NRHP-listed in White County, Arkansas
- Lightle House (County Road 76, Searcy, Arkansas), NRHP-listed in White County, Arkansas
- William H. Lightle House (601 East Race Street, Searcy, Arkansas), NRHP-listed in White County, Arkansas
- National Register of Historic Places listings in White County, Arkansas, NRHP-listed in White County, Arkansas
