= Watkins House =

Watkins House may refer to:

== United States ==
- Tom Watkins House, Searcy, Arkansas, listed on the National Register of Historic Places (NRHP) in White County
- Watkins House (Searcy, Arkansas), NRHP-listed in White County
- Watkins-Cartan House, Atherton, California, NRHP-listed in San Mateo County, also known as Commodore James Watkins House
- Dunn-Watkins House, Lancaster, Kentucky, NRHP-listed in Kentucky
- Thomas B. Watkins House, Lexington, Kentucky, NRHP-listed in Kentucky
- Watkins House (Minden, Louisiana), NRHP-listed in Louisiana
- Watkins House and Cabins, South Casco, Maine, NRHP-listed
- Watkins Point Farm, Marion Station, Maryland, NRHP-listed
- Watkins Manor House, Winona, Minnesota, NRHP-listed
- W. W. Watkins House, Aberdeen, Mississippi, NRHP-listed in Mississippi
- Watkins House (Richmond, Missouri), NRHP-listed
- Watkins Family Farm Historic District, Raymore, Missouri, NRHP-listed
- Albert Watkins House, Lincoln, Nebraska, NRHP-listed in Nebraska
- Mason-Watkins House, Surry, New Hampshire, NRHP-listed
- Watkins House (Centerville, Ohio), NRHP-listed in Ohio
- J. F. Watkins House, Portland, Oregon, NRHP-listed
- Frances Ellen Watkins, House, Philadelphia, Pennsylvania, NRHP-listed in Pennsylvania
- William Watkins House, Mt. Pleasant, Tennessee, NRHP-listed
- Watkins-Witt House, Talbott, Tennessee, NRHP-listed in Tennessee
- Kesterson-Watkins House, Tazewell, Tennessee, NRHP-listed in Tennessee
- William L. and Mary Watkins House, Brigham City, Utah, NRHP-listed
- Watkins-Coleman House, Midway, Utah, NRHP-listed
- John and Margaret Watkins House, Midway, Utah, NRHP-listed in Utah
- Watkins-Tholman-Larsen Farmstead, Mt. Pleasant, Utah, NRHP-listed in Utah
- Watkins House (Keysville, Virginia), NRHP-listed
- Watkins Ferry Toll House, Martinsburg, West Virginia, NRHP-listed
