= Lightle House (County Road 76, Searcy, Arkansas) =

Historic house in Arkansas, United States

- U.S. National Register of Historic Places
- Location within Arkansas Location within the United States
- Nearest city: Searcy, Arkansas
- Coordinates: 35°15′20″N 91°42′40″W
- Area: less than one acre
- Built: 1920
- Architectural style: Vernacular saddlebag
- MPS: White County MPS
- NRHP reference No.: 91001224
- Added to NRHP: July 20, 1992

The Lightle House is a historic house on County Road 76 in White County, Arkansas, just north of the Searcy city limits. It is a single story wood-frame structure, with a side gable roof, a shed-roof porch across the front, and a central chimney. An addition extends to the rear, giving it a T shape, with a second chimney projecting from that section. Built about 1920, it is the county's only known surviving example of a saddlebag house.

The house was listed on the National Register of Historic Places in 1992.

== See also ==
- Ben Lightle House (301 East Market Avenue, Searcy, Arkansas)
- Lightle House (107 North Elm Street, Searcy, Arkansas)
- Lightle House (605 Race Avenue, Searcy, Arkansas)
- William H. Lightle House (601 East Race Street, Searcy, Arkansas)
- National Register of Historic Places listings in White County, Arkansas
