= Wilburn House =

Historic house in Arkansas, United States

- U.S. National Register of Historic Places
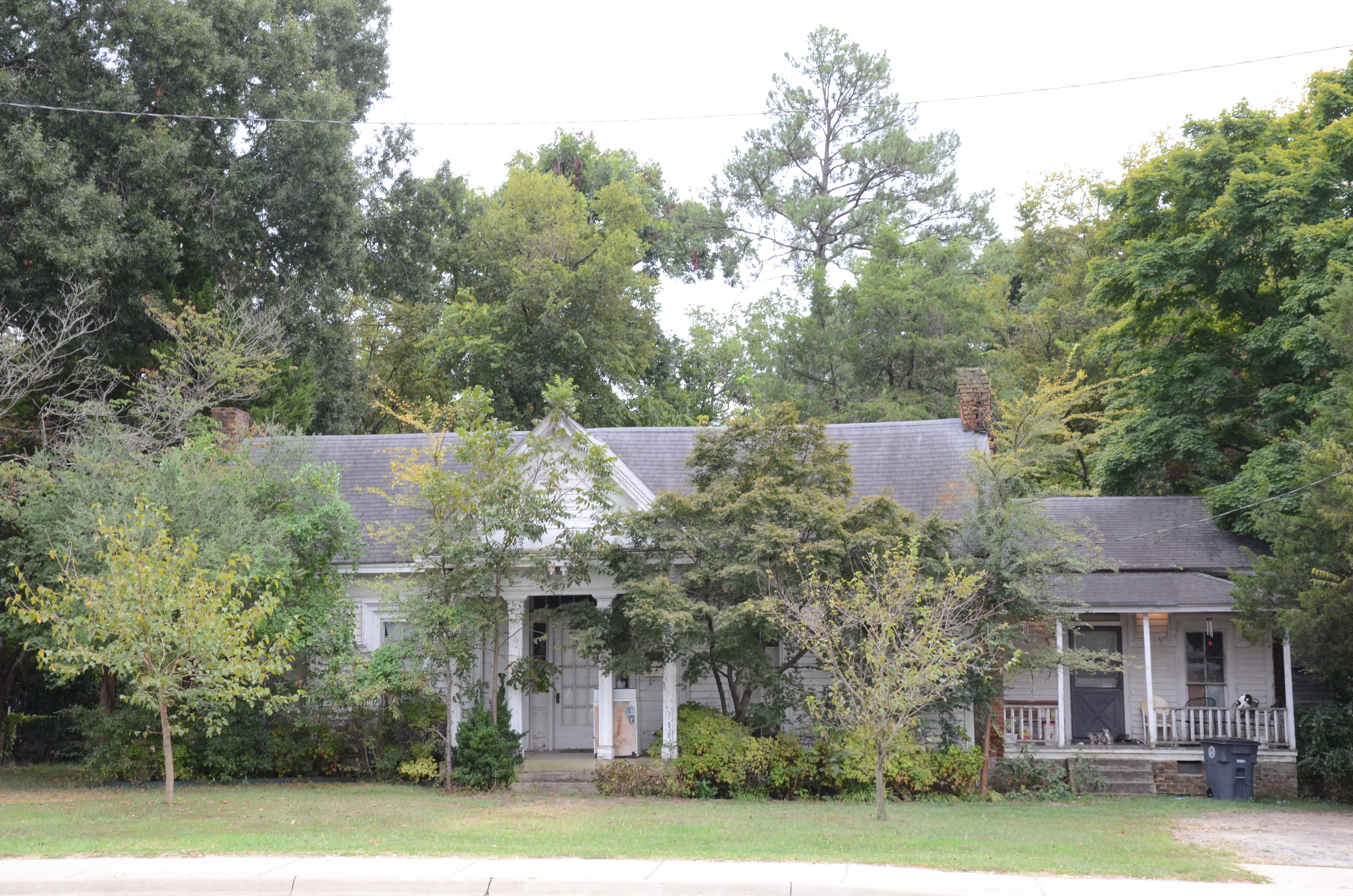

- Location within Arkansas Location within the United States
- Location: 707 E. Race St., Searcy, Arkansas
- Coordinates: 35°15′2″N 91°43′48″W
- Area: less than one acre
- Built: 1875
- Architectural style: Greek Revival
- MPS: White County MPS
- NRHP reference No.: 91001177
- Added to NRHP: September 5, 1991

The Wilburn House is a historic house at 707 East Race Street in Searcy, Arkansas. It is a single-story wood-frame structure, with a side gable roof, weatherboard siding, and a brick foundation. It has a projecting gabled entry porch, with a broad frieze and fully pedimented gable supported by square columns with molded capitals. Built about 1875, it is one of Searcy's finest surviving pre-railroad houses.

The house was listed on the National Register of Historic Places in 1991.

== See also ==
- National Register of Historic Places listings in White County, Arkansas
