= Rascoe House =

Historic house in Arkansas, United States

- Formerly listed on the U.S. National Register of Historic Places
- Location within Arkansas Location within the United States
- Location: 702 Main St., Searcy, Arkansas
- Coordinates: 35°14′33″N 91°44′10″W
- Area: less than one acre
- Built: 1915
- Architectural style: Vernacular single-pile
- MPS: White County MPS
- NRHP reference No.: 91001213

Significant dates
- Added to NRHP: July 23, 1992
- Removed from NRHP: January 26, 2018

The Rascoe House was a historic house at 702 Main Street in Searcy, Arkansas. It was a single story wood-frame structure, with a gabled roof, weatherboard siding, and a foundation of brick piers. It was built about 1915, and was one a few surviving examples in White County of a vernacular central-passage house from that period.

The house was listed on the National Register of Historic Places in 1992. It has been listed as destroyed in the Arkansas Historic Preservation Program database, and was delisted in 2018.

== See also ==
- National Register of Historic Places listings in White County, Arkansas
