= Ben Lightle House =

Historic house in Arkansas, United States

- U.S. National Register of Historic Places
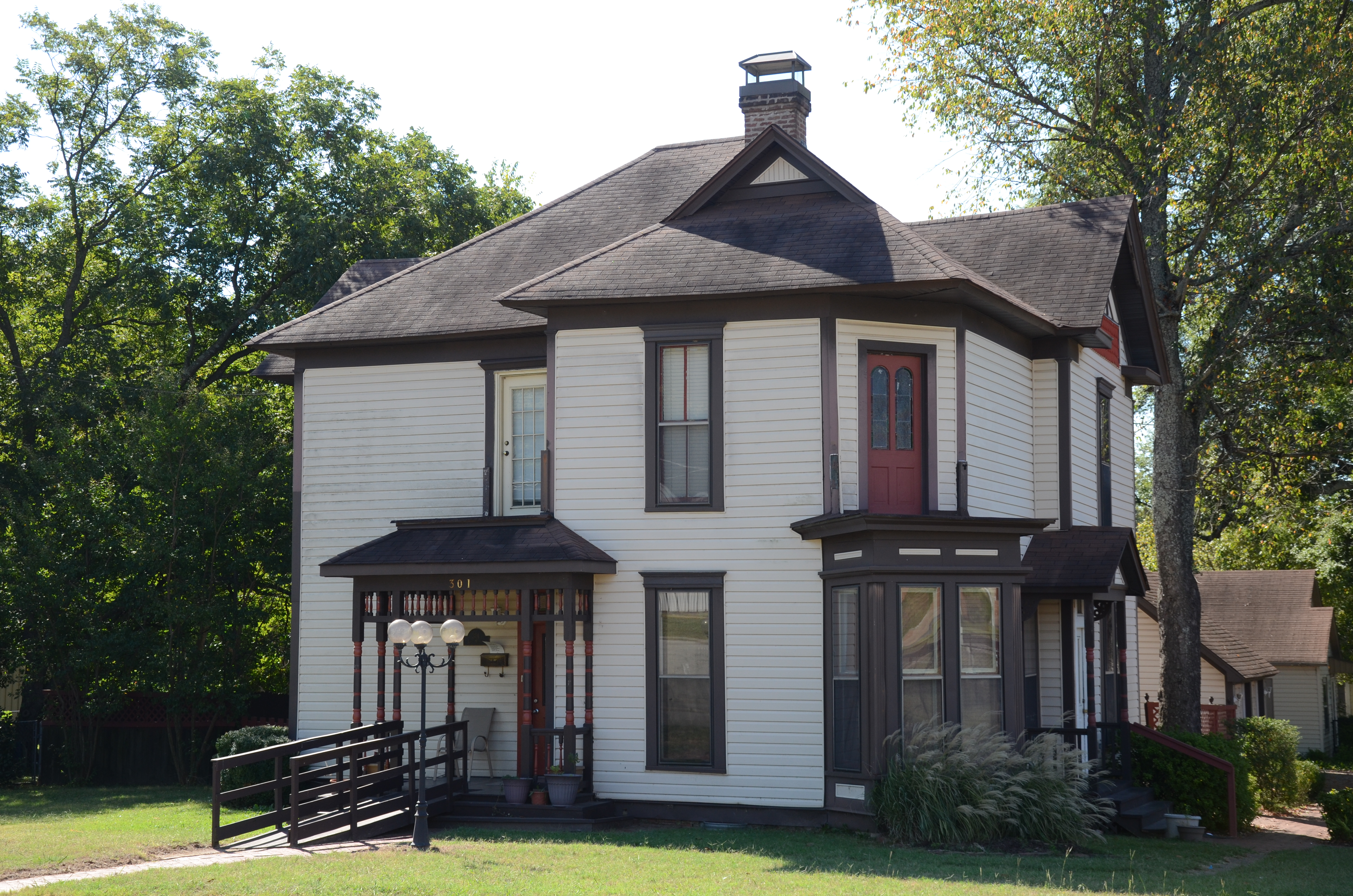

- Location within Arkansas Location within the United States
- Location: 301 E. Market Ave., Searcy, Arkansas
- Coordinates: 35°14′58″N 91°44′6″W
- Area: less than one acre
- Built: 1898
- Architectural style: Late Victorian, Vernacular Folk Victorian
- MPS: White County MPS
- NRHP reference No.: 91001216
- Added to NRHP: September 5, 1991

The Ben Lightle House is a historic house at North Locust and East Market streets in Searcy, Arkansas. It is a two-story wood-frame structure, with a variety of porches and projecting sections typical of the Queen Anne period. One of its porches has decorative turned posts and spindled balustrades. Built in 1898, it is one of the best-preserved surviving vernacular Queen Anne Victorians in White County.

The house was listed on the National Register of Historic Places in 1991.

== See also ==
- Lightle House (107 North Elm Street, Searcy, Arkansas)
- Lightle House (605 Race Avenue, Searcy, Arkansas)
- Lightle House (County Road 76, Searcy, Arkansas)
- William H. Lightle House (601 East Race Street, Searcy, Arkansas)
- National Register of Historic Places listings in White County, Arkansas
