= Lightle House (107 North Elm Street, Searcy, Arkansas) =

Historic house in Arkansas, United States

- Formerly listed on the U.S. National Register of Historic Places
- Location within Arkansas Location within the United States
- Location: 107 N. Elm St., Searcy, Arkansas
- Coordinates: 35°14′57″N 91°44′27″W
- Area: less than one acre
- Built: 1918
- Architectural style: Colonial Revival, Bungalow/craftsman
- MPS: White County MPS
- NRHP reference No.: 91001244

Significant dates
- Added to NRHP: September 5, 1991
- Removed from NRHP: January 26, 2018

The Lightle House was a historic house at 107 North Elm Street in Searcy, Arkansas. It was a two-story wood-frame structure, with a gabled roof, stuccoed wood shingle exterior, and a foundation of brick piers. It exhibited a combination of Craftsman and Colonial Revival elements, and was built in 1918. It was considered one of the city's finest examples of Colonial Revival architecture.

The house was listed on the National Register of Historic Places in 1991. It has been listed as destroyed in the Arkansas Historic Preservation Program database, and was delisted in 2018.

== See also ==
- Ben Lightle House (301 East Market Avenue, Searcy, Arkansas)
- Lightle House (605 Race Avenue, Searcy, Arkansas)
- Lightle House (County Road 76, Searcy, Arkansas)
- William H. Lightle House (601 East Race Street, Searcy, Arkansas)
- National Register of Historic Places listings in White County, Arkansas
