= Beebe station =

- Beebe Railroad Station
- U.S. National Register of Historic Places
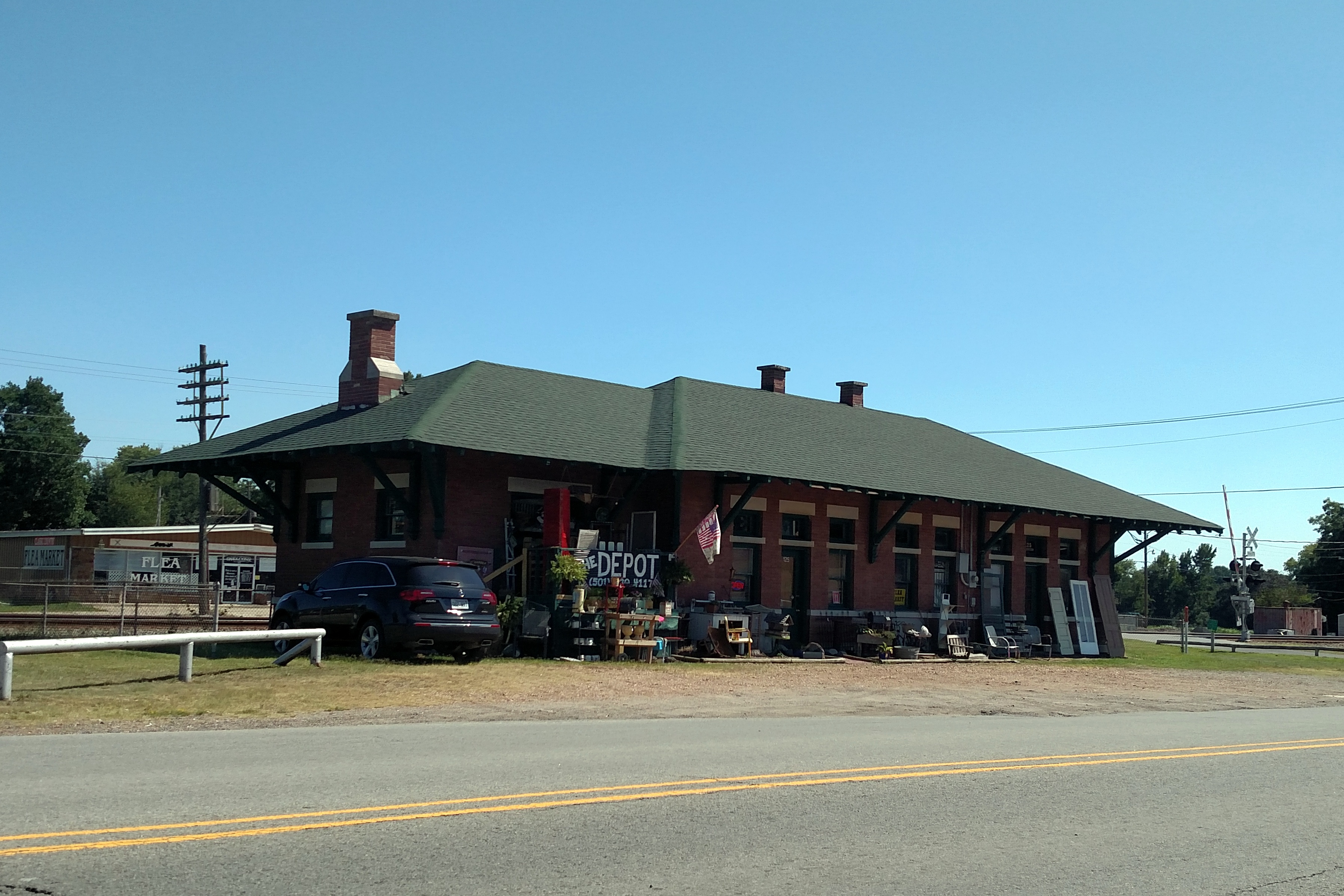

- Location within Arkansas Location within the United States
- Location: Center St., Beebe, Arkansas
- Coordinates: 35°4′11″N 91°52′49″W
- Area: less than one acre
- Built: 1910
- Built by: Missouri-Pacific Railroad
- NRHP reference No.: 79000465
- Added to NRHP: December 11, 1979

The Beebe Railroad Station is a historic railroad station building located on Center Street in Beebe, Arkansas. It is a single-story brick building, with a broad hip roof with overhanging eaves supported by large brackets. It was built in 1910 by the Missouri-Pacific Railroad, and is one of the best-preserved of this type of station in the state. It is also a reminder of the importance of the railroad in Beebe's original development, which was entirely dependent on the railroad.

The station was listed on the National Register of Historic Places in 1979.

== See also ==
- National Register of Historic Places listings in White County, Arkansas

Preceding station	Missouri Pacific Railroad	Following station
Austin, AR toward Texarkana	Texarkana – St. Louis	McRae toward St. Louis
