= Watkins House and Cabins =

Historic house in Maine, United States

- U.S. National Register of Historic Places
- U.S. Historic district
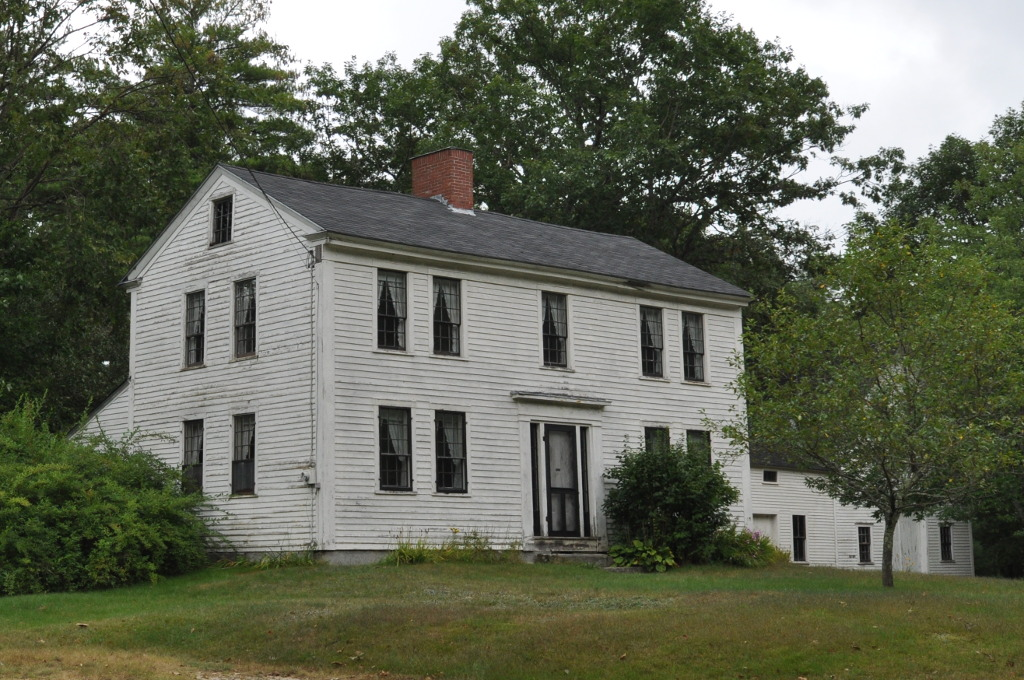
- The main house

- Location within Maine Location within the United States
- Location: Jct. of Raymond Cape Rd. and US 302, South Casco, Maine
- Coordinates: 43.91282°N 70.51612°W
- Area: 13.3 acres (5.4 ha)
- Built: 1810
- Architectural style: Greek Revival, Federal
- NRHP reference No.: 92000792
- Added to NRHP: July 2, 1992

The Watkins House and Cabins are a history property at the junction of Raymond Cape Road and United States Route 302 in Casco, Maine. The property exemplifies the adaptive alteration and reuse of properties for different purposes over a 200-year period in southern Maine. The property is 13 acres (5.3 ha) in size, much of which is now woodland and pasture. The developed portion of the property includes two houses, one of which dates to the early 19th century, a barn, and three small cabins, as well as the remains of a carriage factory. The property was listed on the National Register of Historic Places in 1992.

== Description and history ==
The early history of this property is not known in detail. The main house is a five-bay, 2 1/2-story wood-frame structure, with a central chimney and a side-gable roof. The Federal styling of some of the trim and interior woodwork suggests an early 18th-century construction date, but the early owners of the property are not known. The first documented owner, William Hill, probably acquired the property in the late 1830s, and added the Greek Revival entry surround. A recessed ell extends to the right of the house, joining it to a late 19th-century barn. Hill probably also built at least a portion of the ell, which in 1880 did not extend as far as the barn standing then, which was destroyed by fire in 1883. Hill was a dairy farmer, raising cows and sheep.

At the northwestern corner of the property stands a 1 1/2-story Cape style house, presumed to have been built by Clark Watkins not long after he purchased the land (a parcel abutting Hill's) in 1837. Watkins's widow Mary acquired the Hill farm in 1876, and moved into its larger house, renting the Cape to tenants. In 1877 Sumner Watkins, the son of Mary and Clark, established a carriage factory on the Hill property, at a site across Raymond Neck Road from the main house. This marked the beginning of a shift away from agricultural uses of the property, although the Watkinses did continue to produce dairy products and apples into the 20th century. The carriage factory operated until 1907, and the building was torn down in the 1930s.

In the 1920s Charley Watkins (1889-1974) adapted the property for use as a summer rental site. In addition to the 1837 Cape, he built a small office and eight cabins, which were, according to his advertising, equipped with heat and open all year. He also offered space for trailers, and rented rooms in the main house, taking advantage of Maine's improved road systems and the rise of leisure travel by automobile. The property declined after the realignment of US 302 in the 1950s, which took land and eliminated one of the property's wells. All but three of the cabins were torn down in the 1980s.

The property is now protected by a conservation easement.

== See also ==
- National Register of Historic Places listings in Cumberland County, Maine
