= Tom Watkins House =

Historic house in Arkansas, United States

- U.S. National Register of Historic Places
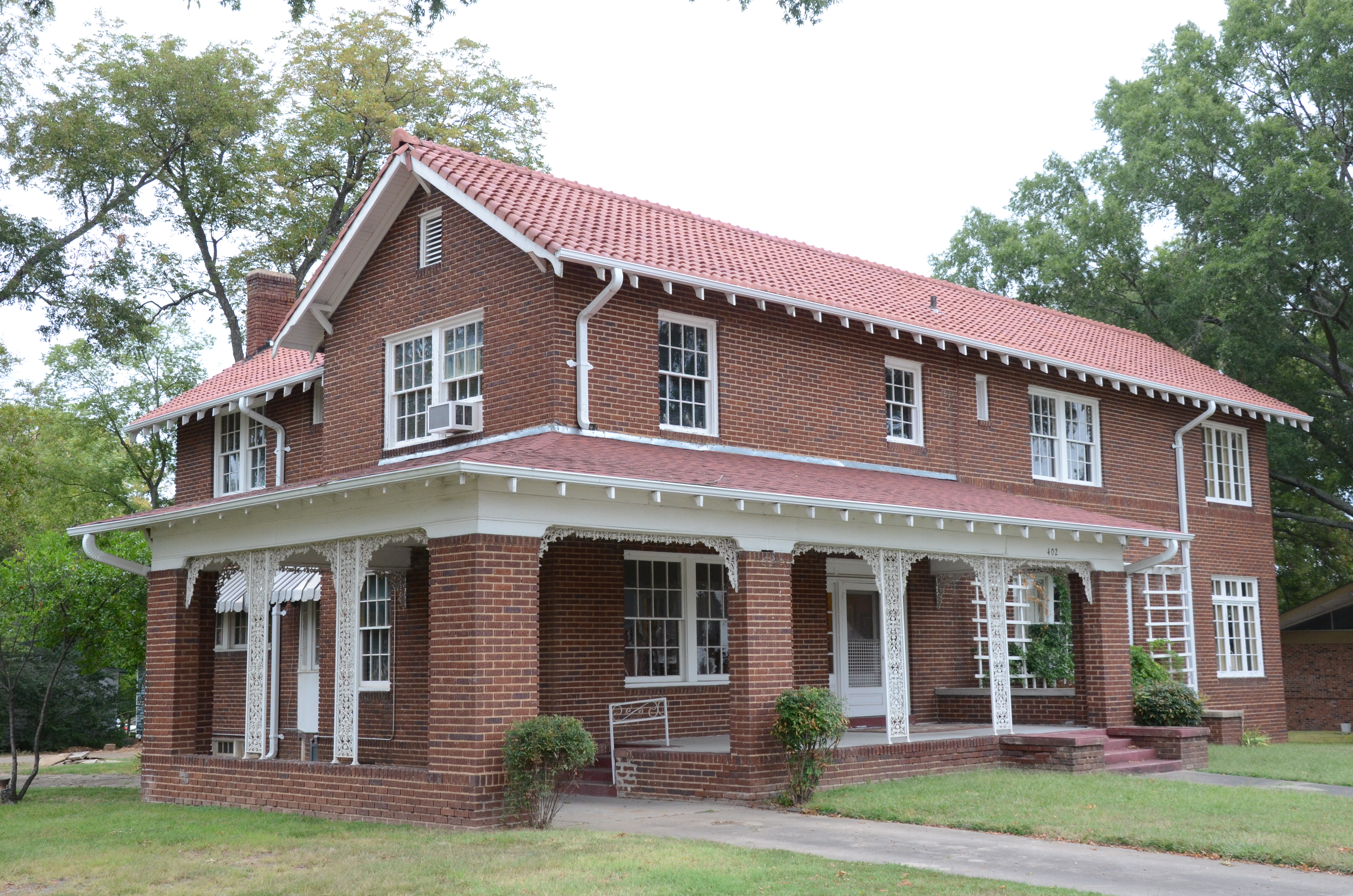

- Location within Arkansas Location within the United States
- Location: Jct. of Oak and Race Sts., Searcy, Arkansas
- Coordinates: 35°15′3″N 91°44′1″W
- Area: less than one acre
- Built: 1920
- Architect: Charles L. Thompson
- Architectural style: Bungalow/craftsman
- MPS: White County MPS
- NRHP reference No.: 91001183
- Added to NRHP: September 5, 1991

The Tom Watkins House is a historic house at Oak and Race Streets in Searcy, Arkansas. It is a two-story brick structure, with a cross-gabled tile roof and a concrete foundation. A porch extends across part of the front and beyond the left side, forming a carport. The main roof and porch roof both feature exposed rafter tails in the Craftsman style, and there are small triangular brackets in the gable ends. The house, a fine local example of Craftsman architecture, was built about 1920 to a design by Charles L. Thompson.

The house was listed on the National Register of Historic Places in 1991.

== See also ==
- National Register of Historic Places listings in White County, Arkansas
