= William H. Lightle House =

Historic house in Arkansas, United States

- U.S. National Register of Historic Places
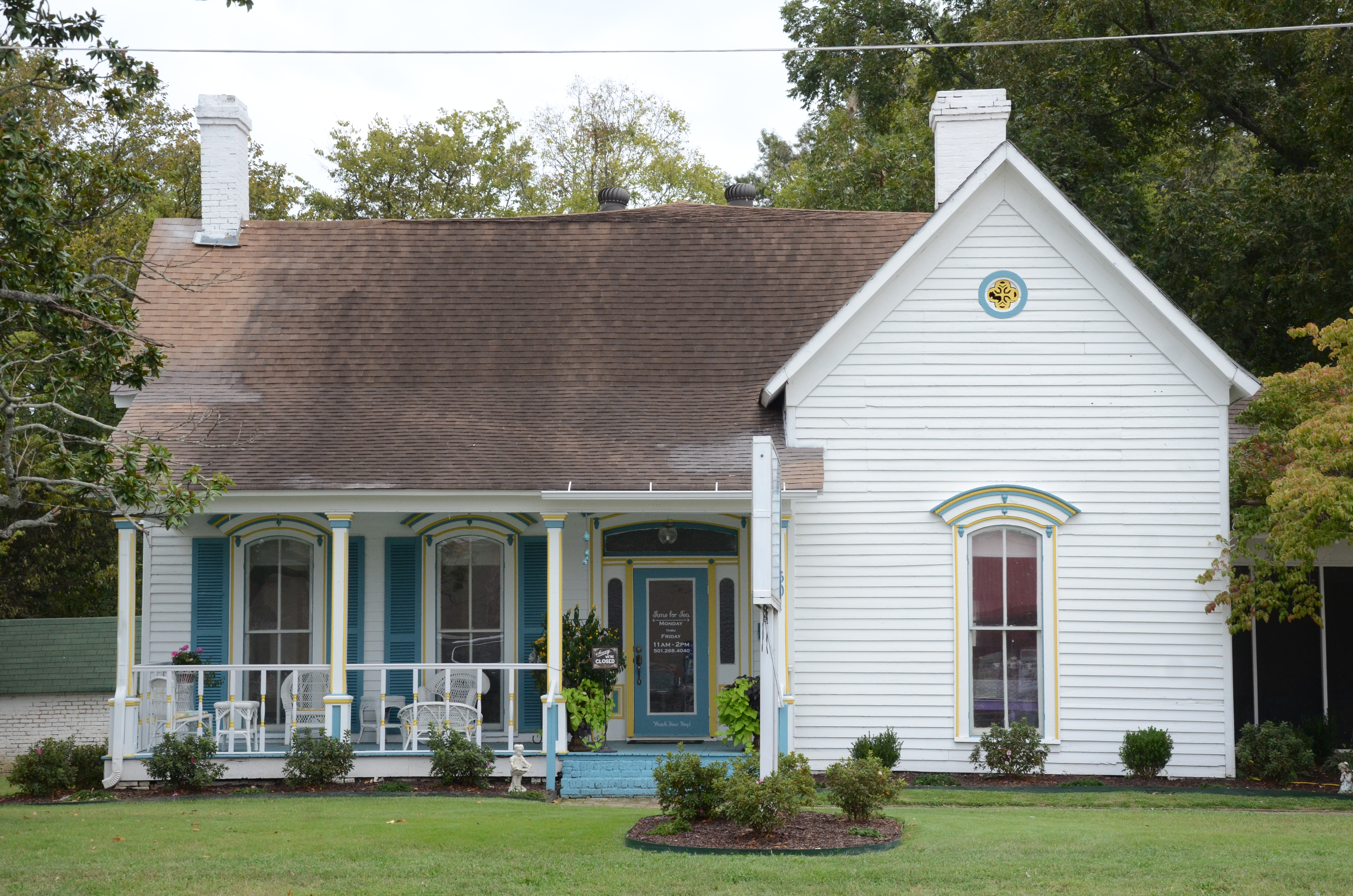

- Location within Arkansas Location within the United States
- Location: 601 E. Race St., Searcy, Arkansas
- Coordinates: 35°15′2″N 91°43′55″W
- Area: less than one acre
- Built: 1881
- Architectural style: Italianate, Vernacular Italianate
- MPS: White County MPS
- NRHP reference No.: 91001226
- Added to NRHP: September 5, 1991

The William H. Lightle House is a historic house at 601 East Race Street in Searcy, Arkansas. It is a roughly L-shaped 1 1/2-story wood-frame structure, with a gabled roof, weatherboard siding, and brick foundation. It has vernacular Italianate styling, with tall and narrow segmented-arch windows, and a shed-roof porch supported by square posts set on pedestal bases. The house was built in 1881 for a prominent local businessman, and is one of the county's few Italianate residences.

The house was listed on the National Register of Historic Places in 1991.

== See also ==
- Ben Lightle House (301 East Market Avenue, Searcy, Arkansas)
- Lightle House (107 North Elm Street, Searcy, Arkansas)
- Lightle House (605 Race Avenue, Searcy, Arkansas)
- Lightle House (County Road 76, Searcy, Arkansas)
- National Register of Historic Places listings in White County, Arkansas
