= Watkins House (Searcy, Arkansas) =

Historic house in Arkansas, United States

- U.S. National Register of Historic Places
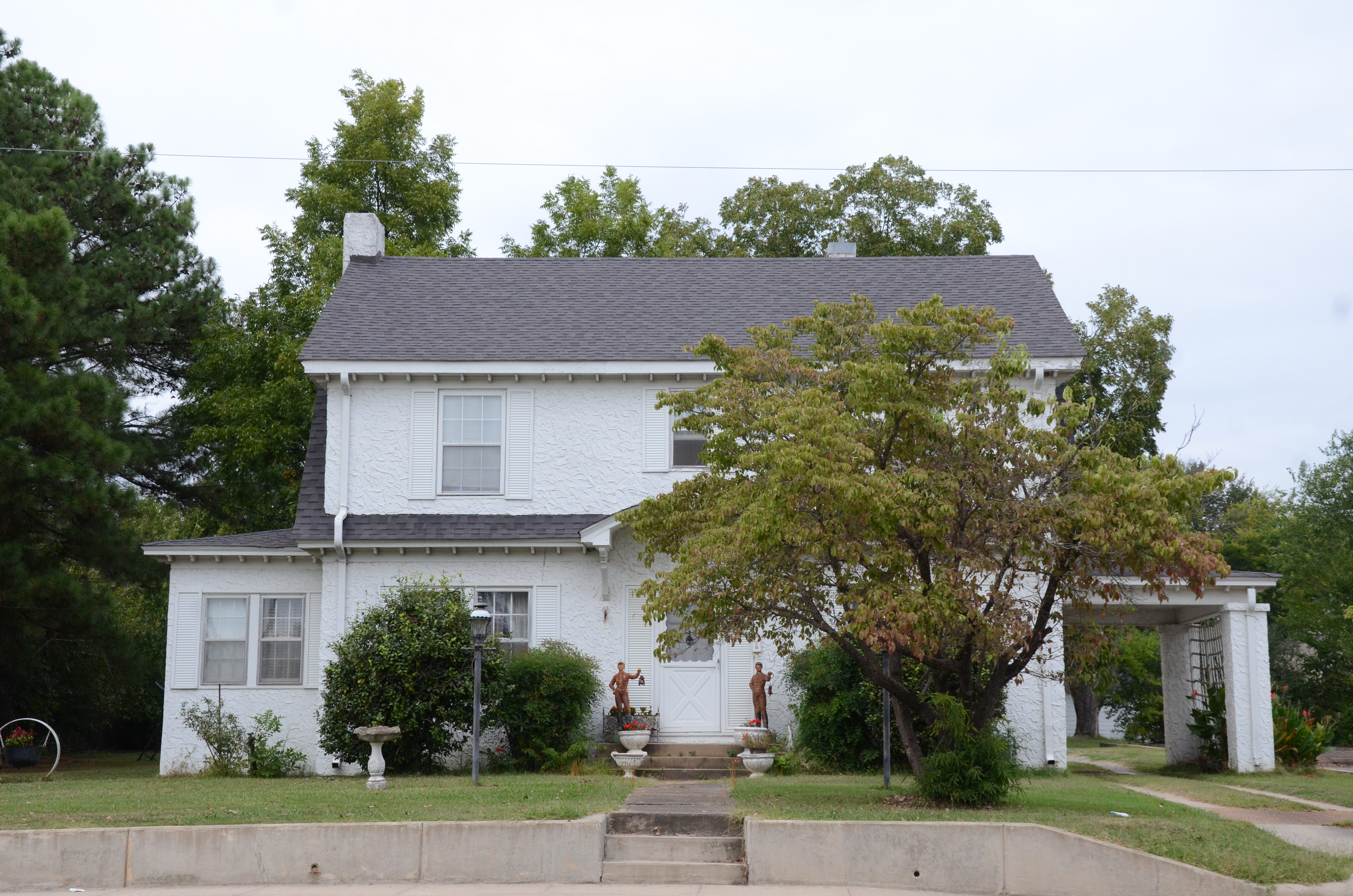

- Location within Arkansas Location within the United States
- Location: 1208 E. Race St., Searcy, Arkansas
- Coordinates: 35°15′3″N 91°43′25″W
- Area: less than one acre
- Built: 1919
- Architectural style: Colonial Revival, Bungalow/craftsman
- MPS: White County MPS
- NRHP reference No.: 91001182
- Added to NRHP: September 5, 1991

The Watkins House is a historic house at 1208 East Race Street in Searcy, Arkansas. It is a two-story wood-frame structure, with a side gambrel roof and original stucco exterior. A single-story ell extends to the left, and a similarly sized carport extends to the right. The gambrel nature of the roof is somewhat obscured by the large shed-roof dormer that extends across most of the front. Built 1919–20, it is one of a small number of Colonial Revival houses in the community.

The house was listed on the National Register of Historic Places in 1991.

== See also ==
- National Register of Historic Places listings in White County, Arkansas
