= Lightle House (605 Race Avenue, Searcy, Arkansas) =

Historic house in Arkansas, United States

- U.S. National Register of Historic Places
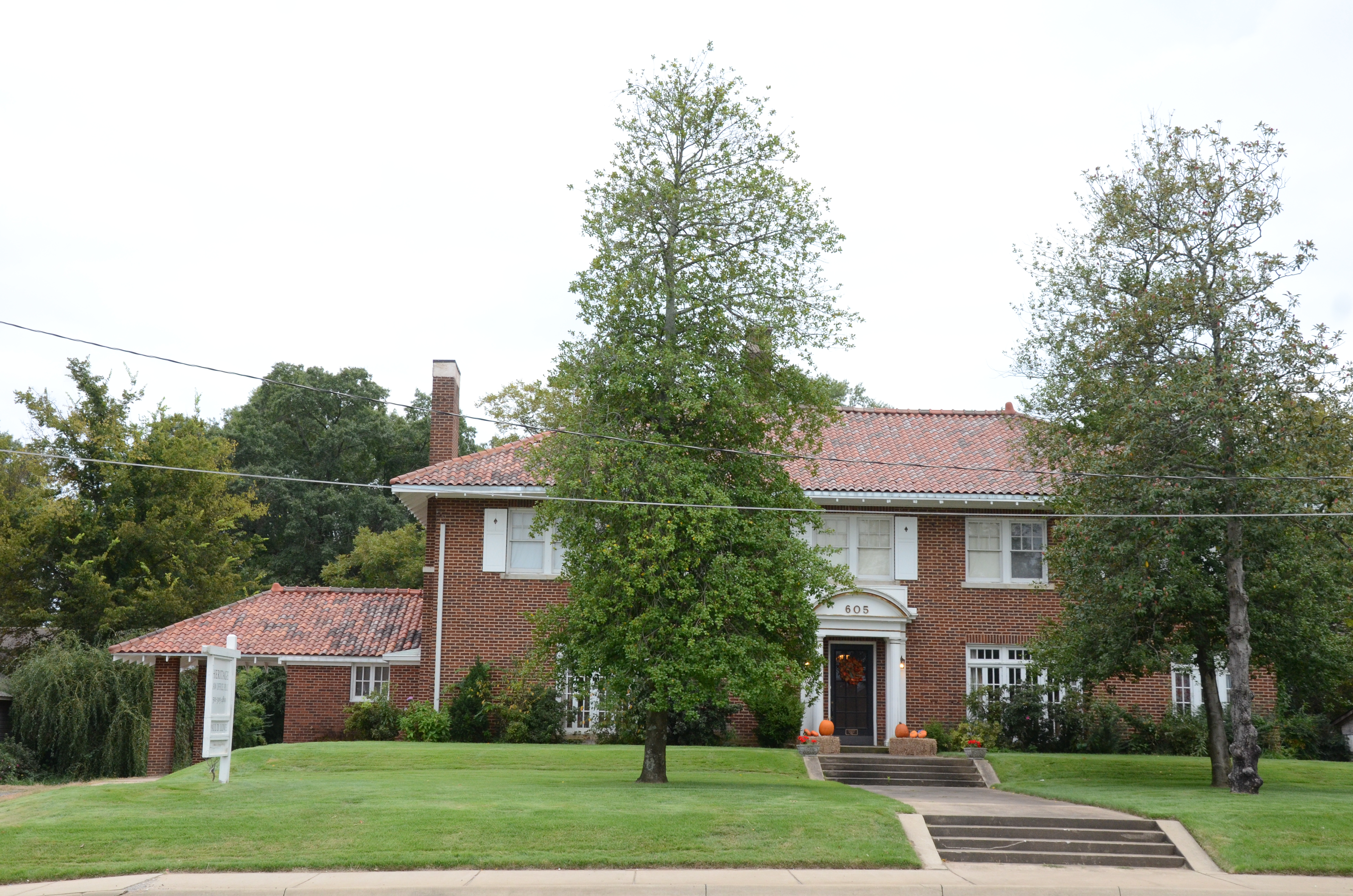

- Location within Arkansas Location within the United States
- Location: 605 Race Ave., Searcy, Arkansas
- Coordinates: 35°15′1″N 91°43′50″W
- Built: 1925
- Architect: Charles L. Thompson
- Architectural style: Colonial Revival
- MPS: Thompson, Charles L., Design Collection TR
- NRHP reference No.: 82000958
- Added to NRHP: December 22, 1982

The Lightle House, a historic house at 605 Race Avenue in Searcy, Arkansas contains two stories, a full basement, and a full attic. Its brick facade attaches to a reinforced concrete foundation which supports a tile hip roof covered with Ludowici tiles. Designed by Charles L. Thompson, it has plans dated December 1923, so construction started in 1924 and continued until the Edward Lightle family moved into the house in April 1925, a date documented on the underside of a garden urn presently located under a wrought iron gazebo in the back yard.

The house is an elongated version of a somewhat standard Colonial Revival plan produced by Thompson and Harding, with a porte-cochere at one end, and an elaborate entry, with sidelight windows, and pilasters supporting an entablature and arced pediment. Though made to look original, the present back yard balcony is not original but replaced a rotted wood balcony added in 1996 when the house was renovated to serve as a bed & breakfast.

That renovation also enclosed the second floor sleeping porch. Presently, it has seven bedrooms, each with its own bathroom, as well as a commercial kitchen, two dining rooms, and three rooms used for office space.

The house was listed on the National Register of Historic Places in 1982.

== See also ==
- Ben Lightle House (301 East Market Avenue, Searcy, Arkansas)
- Lightle House (107 North Elm Street, Searcy, Arkansas)
- Lightle House (County Road 76, Searcy, Arkansas)
- William H. Lightle House (601 East Race Street, Searcy, Arkansas)
- National Register of Historic Places listings in White County, Arkansas
