= Jameson-Richards Gas Station =

- U.S. National Register of Historic Places
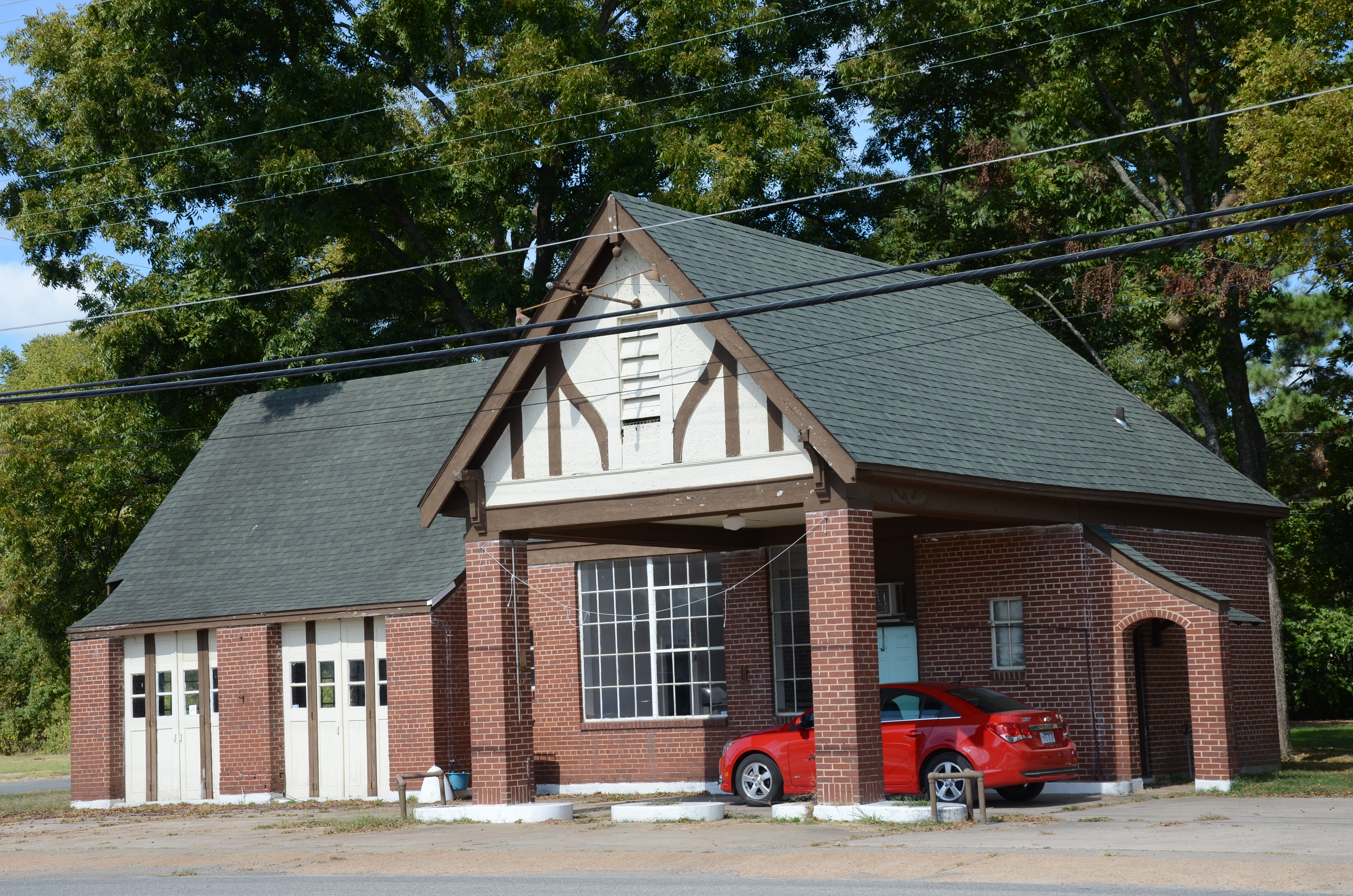

- Location within Arkansas Location within the United States
- Location: Jct. of AR 367 and Vine St., Bald Knob, Arkansas
- Coordinates: 35°18′34″N 91°34′8″W
- Area: less than one acre
- Built: 1931
- Architectural style: English Revival
- MPS: White County MPS
- NRHP reference No.: 91001279
- Added to NRHP: September 5, 1991

The Jameson-Richards Gas Station is a historic automobile service station on Arkansas Highway 367 in Bald Knob, Arkansas. Built in the early 1930s, it is a typical period roadside service building, a single-story brick structure with English Revival styling. It is rectangular in plan, with a projecting porte-cochere that has Tudor style half-timbered stucco in its gable end. The main garage bays have original two-leaf swinging doors, and the office area has original multipane casement windows. It stands near the Jameson-Richards Cafe, a similar period roadside building.

The building was listed on the National Register of Historic Places in 1991.

== See also ==
- National Register of Historic Places listings in White County, Arkansas
