= Jameson-Richards Cafe =

- U.S. National Register of Historic Places
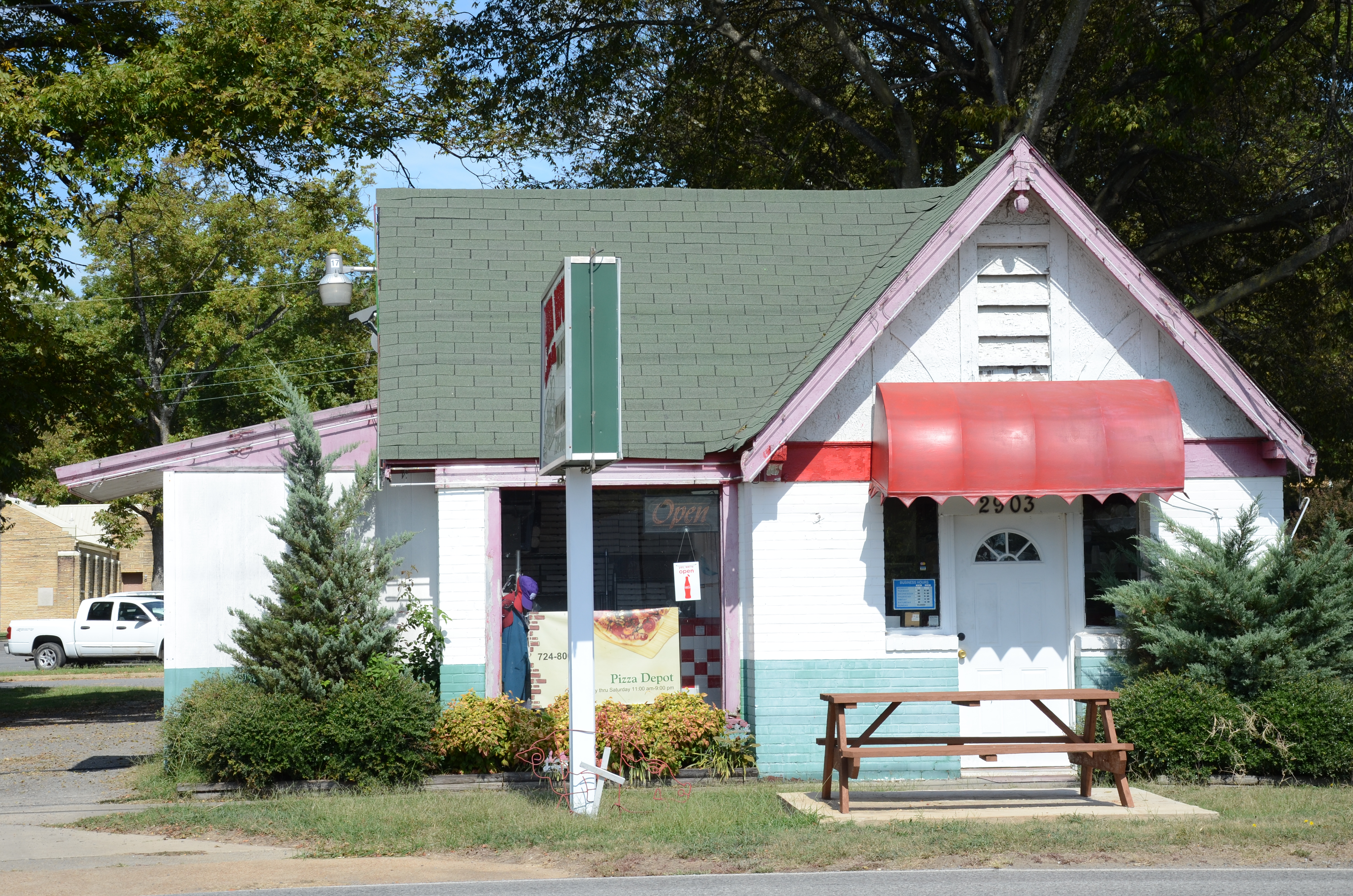

- Location within Arkansas Location within the United States
- Location: AR 367 E of jct. with Vine St., Bald Knob, Arkansas
- Coordinates: 35°18′35″N 91°34′7″W
- Area: less than one acre
- Built: 1931
- Architectural style: English Revival
- MPS: White County MPS
- NRHP reference No.: 91001266
- Added to NRHP: September 5, 1991

The Jameson-Richards Cafe is a historic commercial building on Arkansas Highway 367 in Bald Knob, Arkansas. Built in the 1930s, it is a typical roadside cafe of that period, a single-story brick structure with English Revival features. It is T-shaped in plan, with half-timbered stucco gable ends above brick walls. Most of it windows are original casement, as is the French door that is the main entry. The cafe stands next to the similar Jameson-Richards Gas Station, another period roadside building.

The building was listed on the National Register of Historic Places in 1991.

== See also ==
- National Register of Historic Places listings in White County, Arkansas
