= Lemay House =

Historic house in Arkansas, United States

- Formerly listed on the U.S. National Register of Historic Places
- Location within Arkansas Location within the United States
- Location: 305 S. Cypress St., Beebe, Arkansas
- Coordinates: 35°3′39″N 91°52′37″W
- Area: less than one acre
- Built: 1890
- Architectural style: Vernacular ell-shaped
- MPS: White County MPS
- NRHP reference No.: 91001254

Significant dates
- Added to NRHP: July 20, 1992
- Removed from NRHP: January 26, 2018

The Lemay House was a historic house at 305 South Cypress Street in Beebe, Arkansas. It was an L-shaped single story wood-frame structure, built about 1890, and was one of White County's best-preserved vernacular residences from that time period. It retained original trim elements and period windows, including jigsawn brackets and turned porch posts.

The house was listed on the National Register of Historic Places in 1992. It has been listed as destroyed in the Arkansas Preservation Program's database, and was delisted in 2018.

== See also ==
- National Register of Historic Places listings in White County, Arkansas
