= S.A. Kimbrough House =

Historic house in Arkansas, United States

- S. A. Kimbrough House
- U.S. National Register of Historic Places
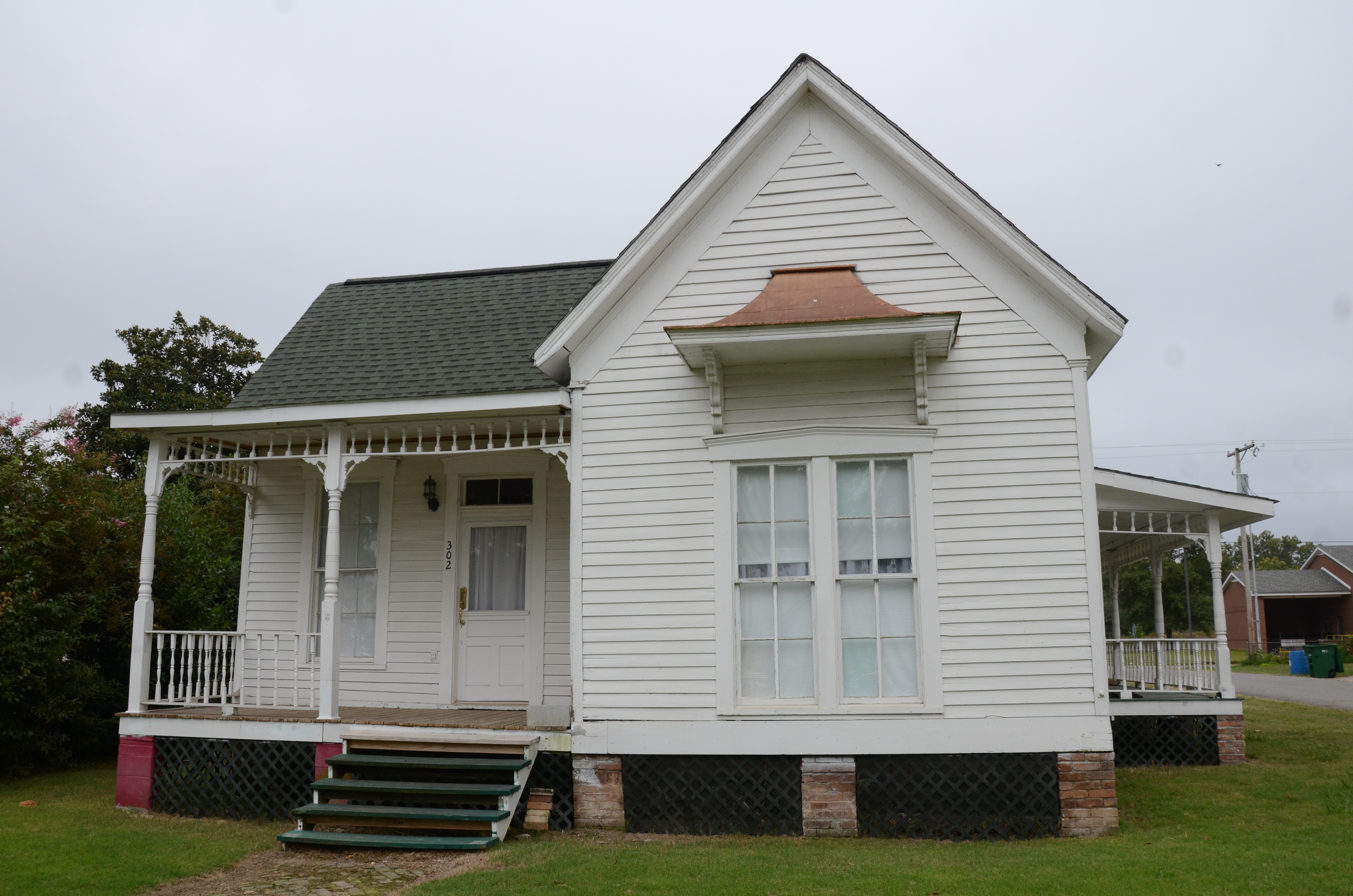

- Location within Arkansas Location within the United States
- Location: 302 E. Illinois St., Beebe, Arkansas
- Coordinates: 35°4′21″N 91°52′43″W
- Area: less than one acre
- Architectural style: Vernacular t-shaped
- MPS: White County MPS
- NRHP reference No.: 91001252
- Added to NRHP: September 5, 1991

The S.A. Kimbrough House is a historic house at 302 East Illinois Street in Beebe, Arkansas. It is a single story wood-frame structure, with a T-shaped layout, cross-gable roof, weatherboard siding, and a brick pier foundation. It has two porches, each with delicate turned posts and balusters, and a bracketed hood over a pair of sash windows in the front-facing gable. Built about 1870, the house is one of White County's oldest surviving houses.

The house was listed on the National Register of Historic Places in 1991.

== See also ==
- National Register of Historic Places listings in White County, Arkansas
