= Arkansas Highway 31 =

State highway in Arkansas, United States

Highway 31
- Hwy 31 highlighted in red

Route information
- Maintained by ArDOT
- Length: 77.53 mi (124.77 km)
- Existed: 1926–present

Major junctions
- South end: US 79B near Altheimer
- AR 15 near Sherrill; US 165 in Coy; US 70 in Lonoke; I-40 in Lonoke; I-57 / US 64 / US 67 / US 167 at Beebe
- North end: AR 5 near Romance

Location
- Country: United States
- State: Arkansas
- Counties: Jefferson, Lonoke, White

Highway system
- Arkansas Highway System; Interstate; US; State; Business; Spurs; Suffixed; Scenic; Heritage
← I-30	→ AR 32

Arkansas Highway 31 (AR 31) is a north–south state highway in Central Arkansas. The route runs 77.53 miles (124.77 km) from U.S. Route 79B (US 79B) north of Pine Bluff north to Highway 5 west of Romance.

== Route description ==
The route begins at US 79B north of Pine Bluff and runs north to intersect Highway 15 near Sherrill. Continuing north, Highway 31 passes the Tucker Unit and passes through farm fields before it enters Lonoke County. The route passes the Walls Farm Barn and Corn Crib, listed on the National Register of Historic Places (NRHP) north of Tomberlin before it has a short concurrency with US 165 through Coy (a rare officially designated exception). Highway 31 continues north through farmland, intersecting Highway 232 at Blakemore before forming a concurrency with US 70 south of Lonoke.

The US 70/Highway 31 overlap continues into downtown Lonoke, ending when Highway 31 turns north along Center Street near the Rock Island Depot and Joe P. Eagle and D. R. Boone Building. Highway 31 serves as the western border of the county courthouse square containing the Lonoke Confederate Monument and Lonoke County Courthouse, before continuing north to an interchange with I-40 in north Lonoke.

Now running as a major collector of rural routes, Highway 31 has a junction with Highway 236 near Woodlawn and the Woodlawn School Building on the NRHP. Minor rural intersections with Highway 321S, Highway 38, and Highway 267 are also south of Beebe. Once the route enters Beebe, a concurrency forms with US 67B as Main Street, an officially designated exception. US 67B/Highway 31 passes NRPHP-listed properties Beebe Theater, Staggs-Huffaker Building, Powell Clothing Store, Laws-Jarvis House, and the Smith-Moore House as a narrow two-lane undivided road through Beebe. In north Beebe, the concurrency ends at a junction with I-57/US 64/US 67/US 167.

Highway 31 exits Beebe to the northwest and intersects Highway 321, Highway 321S, Highway 267 and Highway 267S before entering Antioch. Further northwest of Antioch the highway enters Floyd and passes the NRHP-listed Ackins House, Cotton Gin, and L. D. Hutchinson House on its way to Romance. Highway 31 intersects a road which leads to the Pence-Carmichael Farm, Barn and Root Cellar before terminating at Highway 5 west of Romance.

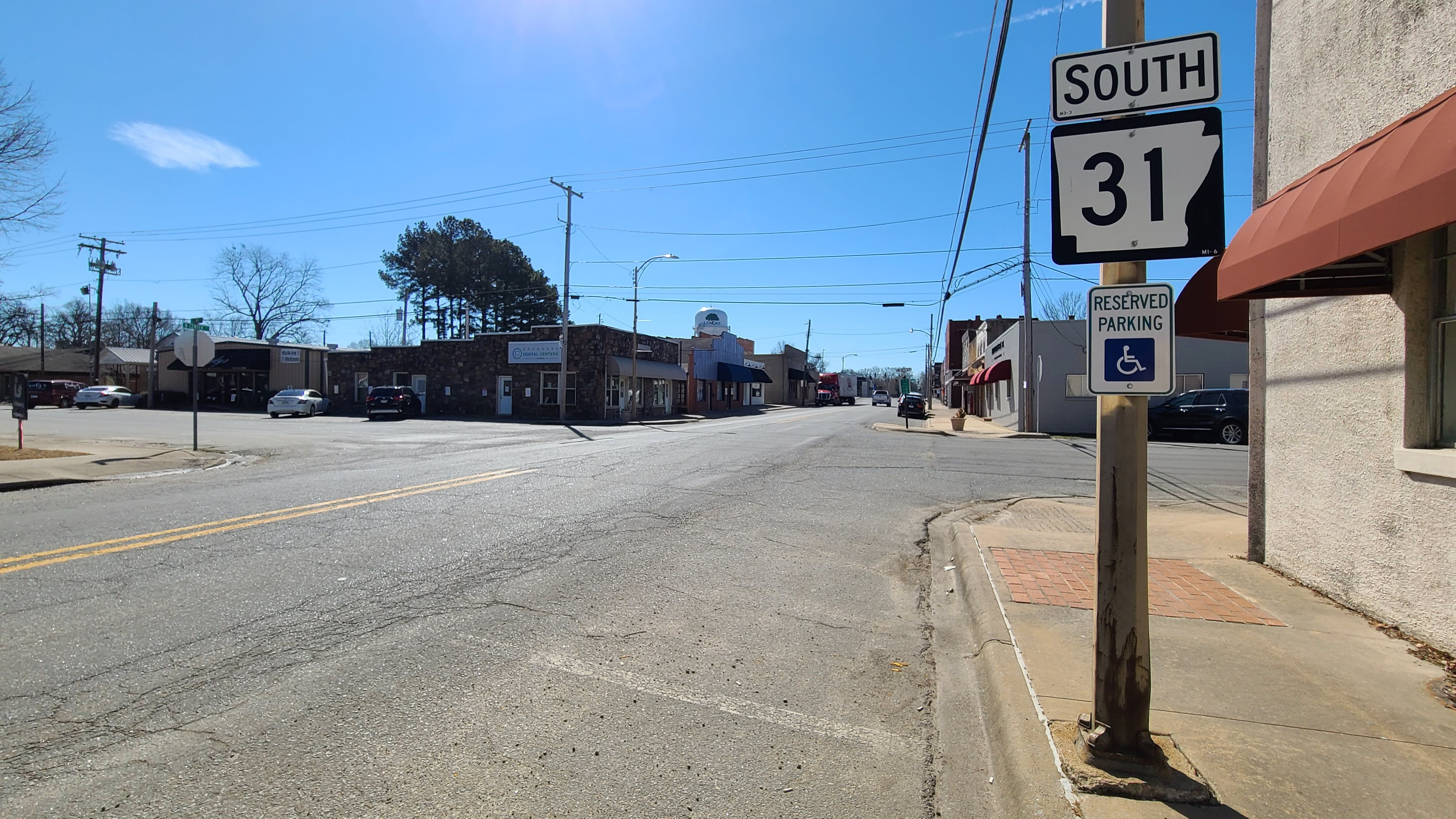
Highway 31 in downtown Lonoke, Arkansas.

== History ==
Highway 31 was one of the original Arkansas state highways when the system was first numbered in 1926. The route ran from Sherrill north roughly along its current routing, terminating at Beebe.

== Major intersections ==
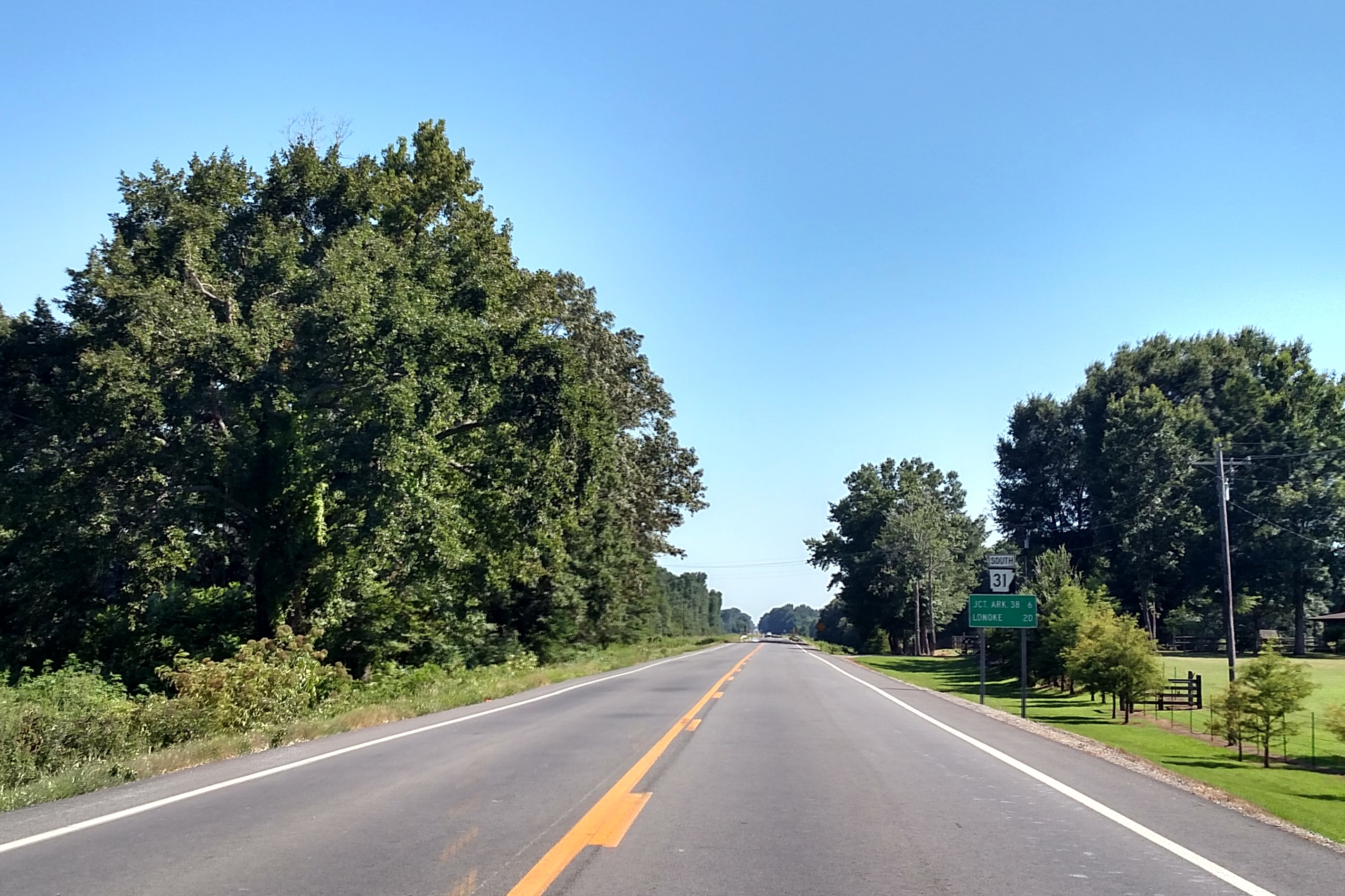
Highway 31 south of Beebe

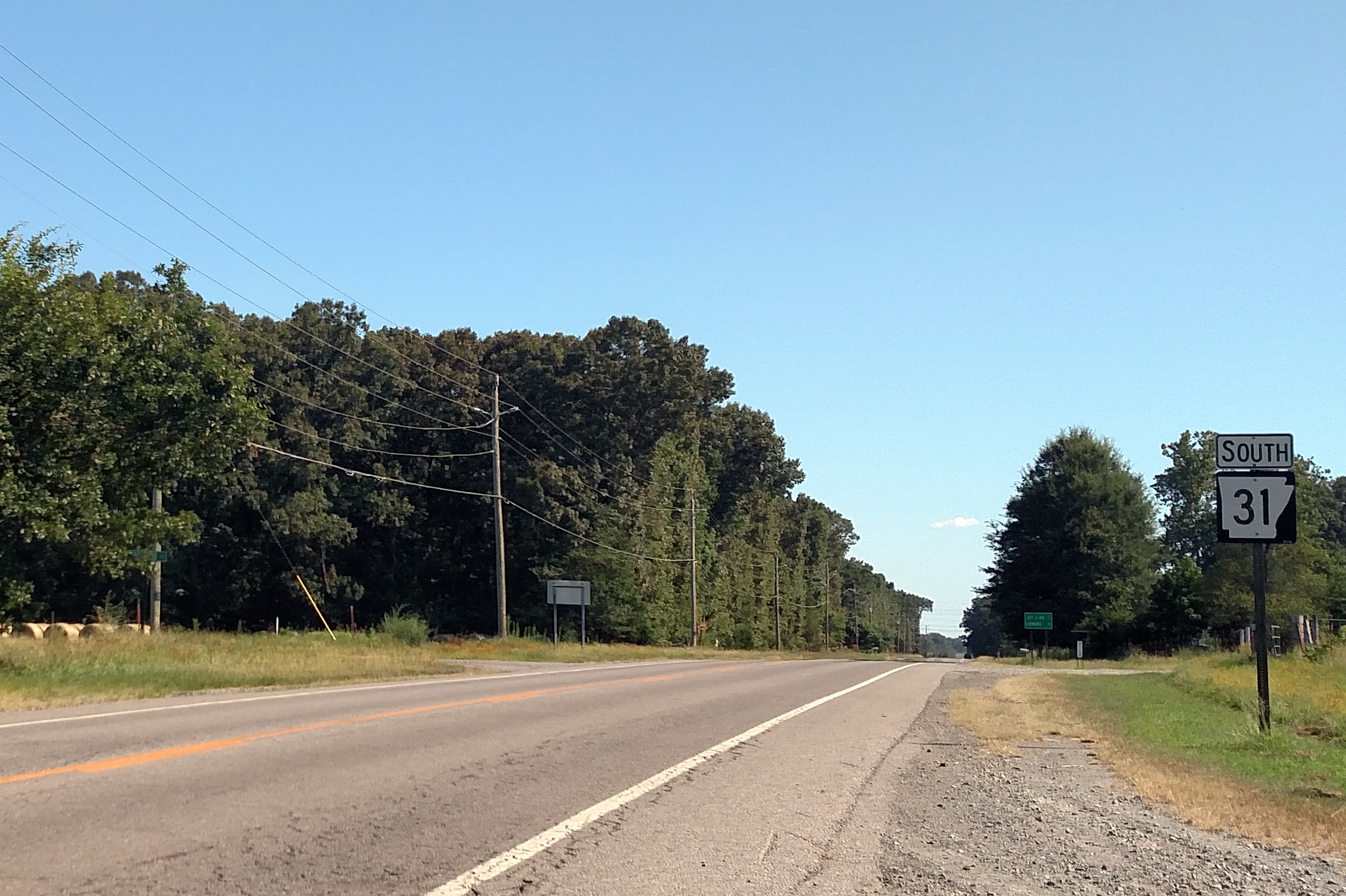
Highway 31 north of Lonoke

Mile markers reset at some concurrencies.

County	Location	mi	km	Destinations	Notes
Jefferson		0.00	0.00	US 79B – Stuttgart, Pine Bluff	Southern terminus
Jefferson		6.02	9.69	AR 15 – Sherrill, Altheimer, North Little Rock	
Lonoke	Coy	21.38	34.41	US 165 south – Stuttgart	Southern end of US 165 concurrency
Lonoke		21.89	35.23	US 165 north – England	Northern end of US 165 concurrency
Lonoke	Blakemore	26.14	42.07	AR 232 east – Seaton	Western terminus of AR 232
Lonoke		38.35	61.72	US 70 west – North Little Rock, Little Rock	Southern end of US 70 concurrency
Lonoke	Lonoke			Fish Hatchery Road (AR 943 east)	
Lonoke	Lonoke			AR 89 north to I-40	Southern terminus of AR 89
Lonoke	Lonoke	0.00	0.00	US 70 east – Carlisle	Northern end of US 70 concurrency
Lonoke	Lonoke	1.64	2.64	I-40 – Little Rock, Memphis	Exit 175 on I-40
Lonoke		6.51	10.48	AR 236 west to AR 89	Eastern terminus of AR 236
Lonoke		9.16	14.74	AR 236 east to AR 13	Western terminus of AR 236
Lonoke		11.15	17.94	AR 321S west – Camp Nelson Confederate Cemetery	Eastern terminus of AR 321S
Lonoke		14.20	22.85	AR 38 – Cabot, Des Arc	
White		18.21	29.31	AR 267 south (Cypress Lake Road) to AR 13 – Hickory Plains	Northern terminus of AR 267
White	Beebe	20.51	33.01	US 67B south (West Center Street) – ASU-Beebe	Southern end of US 67B concurrency
White	Beebe			AR 367 (DeWitt Henry Drive) – ASU-Beebe	
White	Beebe	22.19	35.71	I-57 / US 64 / US 67 / US 167 – Little Rock, McRae, St. Louis US 67B ends	Northern terminus of US 67B; exit 31 on I-57
White		22.91	36.87	AR 321 north	Southern terminus of AR 321
White		24.30	39.11	AR 321S north	Southern terminus of AR 321S
White		24.80	39.91	AR 267S north	Southern terminus of AR 267S
White		25.54	41.10	AR 267 north – Searcy	Southern terminus of AR 267
White	Floyd	31.57	50.81	AR 305 north – Center Hill	Southern terminus of AR 305
White		39.18	63.05	AR 5 – El Paso, Heber Springs	Northern terminus
1.000 mi = 1.609 km; 1.000 km = 0.621 mi: Concurrency terminus

== See also ==
- List of state highways in Arkansas
