= Romance, Arkansas =

Romance
- unincorporated community
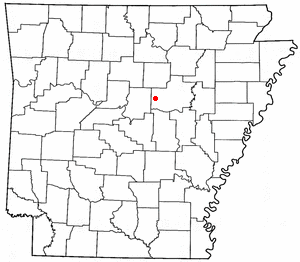
- Coordinates: 35°14′27″N 92°03′05″W
- Country: United States
- State: Arkansas
- County: White County
- Founded: 1800s (approx)
- Elevation: 568 ft (173 m)

Population (2010)
  - Total: 1,772
- Time zone: UTC-6 (CST)
  - Summer (DST): UTC-5 (CDT)
- GNIS feature ID: 54177

Romance is an unincorporated community in west-central White County, Arkansas, United States. The community is located approximately halfway between the town of Rose Bud to the north, and the unincorporated community of El Paso to the south. Alternately, the community is about 16 miles (26 km) northwest of Beebe, and less than 5 miles (8 km) east of Mount Vernon.

Considered as a postal designation (ZIP code: 72136), the population of Romance as of the 2010 census was 1,772 residents.

== Geography and history ==
Lacking exact boundaries, much of the Romance area falls within the borders of Marshall Township and Kentucky Township within White County. As legend maintains, the community was named by a school teacher many years ago who thought the view from bluffs on the community's eastern side was particularly romantic.

Naming of the community has proven significant in maintaining Romance's most visible business, a small branch post office of the United States Postal Service. The local post office is one of several within the USPS system that gain attention because of "love-themed" names, but received special focus in 1990 as the first location to issue that year's stamp in the USPS Love Stamp series. Romance's post office is among those popular around the United States for postmarks of cards for Valentine's Day, as well as for wedding invitations. A side venture of sorts has developed in recent years, with a small number of weddings performed on the grounds of the post office, though the practice is not affiliated with the USPS.

== Government ==
As an unincorporated community, Romance is part of the jurisdiction of the county judge of White County, the county's chief executive, and subject to county-wide ordinances. Local law enforcement is provided by the White County Sheriff's Department, as well as township constables for Marshall and Kentucky townships.

A parachute drop zone, established in the 1980s for Little Rock Air Force Base, is located near Romance.

== Transportation ==
Romance is situated along two major Arkansas state highways:

- Highway 5, a north–south highway serving central Arkansas. This highway continues north to the Missouri state line, and south to Cabot at U.S. Highway 67.
- Highway 31, a north–south highway with a northern terminus in Romance at Arkansas 5 and southern terminus at the U.S. Highway 79 business loop northeast of Pine Bluff.

== Education ==
=== Elementary and secondary ===
Children in the greater Romance area are largely served by the Rose Bud Public School District from pre-K through twelfth grade in nearby Rose Bud. Romance's school district was consolidated with the Rose Bud district during the 1950s, and the community had a local school as early as 1895, when the Harper School on Blackjack Mountain operated. Some eastern portions of the community, near neighboring Floyd, are part of the Beebe Public School District. Both are member schools of the Beebe-based Wilbur D. Mills Educational Service Cooperative. Areas near Highway 310 and Hammons Chapel Road, toward White County's western edge, are part of the Mount Vernon–Enola School District, part of the Arch Ford Educational Service Cooperative based in Plumerville.
