= Woodlawn School Building (Woodlawn, Arkansas) =

United States national historic site

- U.S. National Register of Historic Places
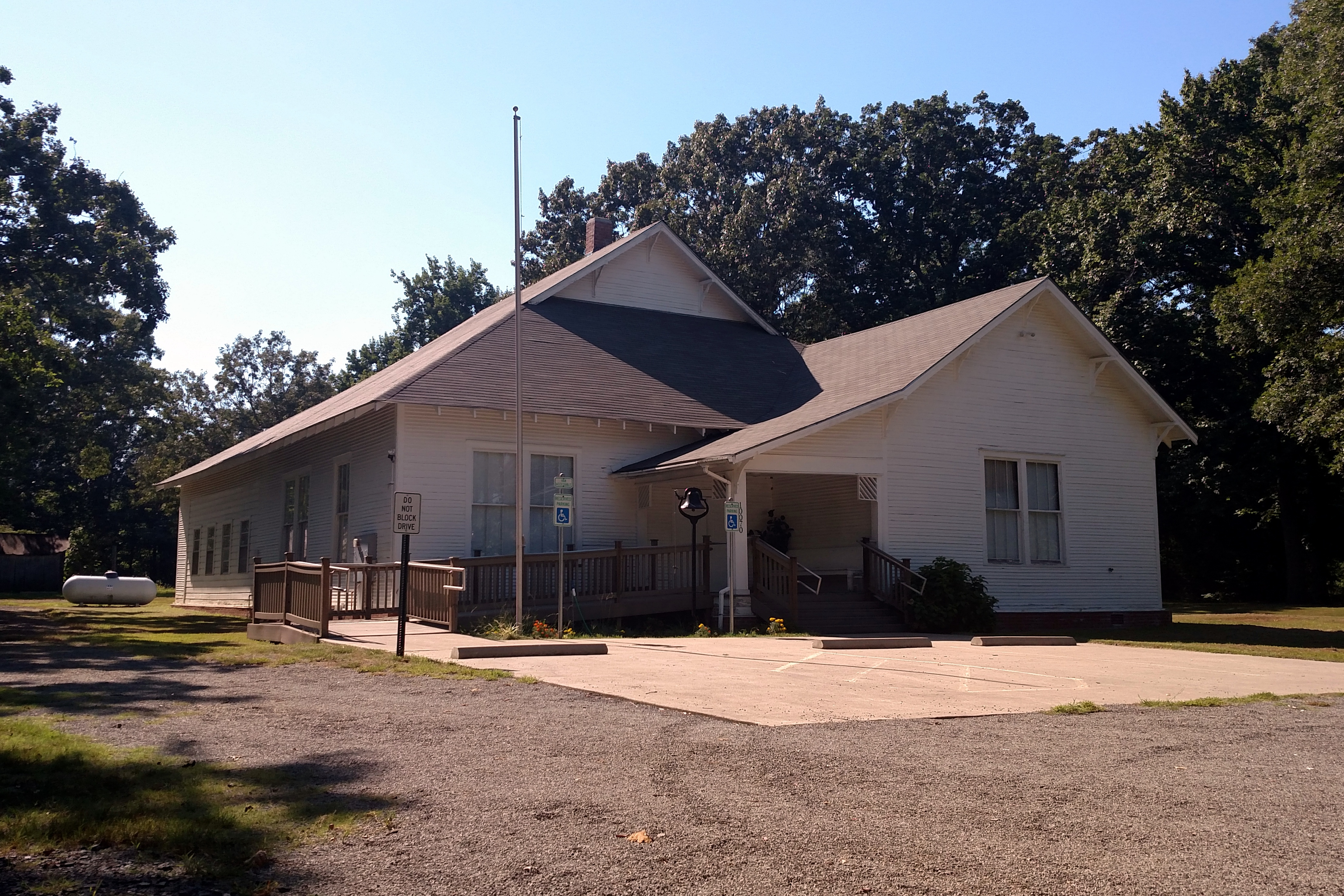

- Location within Arkansas Location within the United States
- Location: NW of jct. of Bizzell Rd. and Highway 31, Woodlawn, Arkansas
- Coordinates: 34°55′22″N 91°52′30″W
- Area: 2 acres (0.81 ha)
- Built: 1921
- Architect: John Prior
- Architectural style: Bungalow/craftsman
- NRHP reference No.: 93000086
- Added to NRHP: February 25, 1993

The Woodlawn School Building is a historic former school building near the junction of Bizzell Road and Arkansas Highway 31 in Woodlawn, Lonoke County, Arkansas. It is a single-story wood-frame structure, built with Craftsman styling in 1921. It has a gable-on-hip roof with extended eaves and exposed rafter tails, and large knee brackets supporting the gable ends. The school consolidated three rural school districts.

The building was listed on the National Register of Historic Places in 1993. It now serves as the community center of the Woodlawn community.

== See also ==
- National Register of Historic Places listings in Lonoke County, Arkansas
