= Ackins House =

Historic house in Arkansas, United States

- U.S. National Register of Historic Places
- Location within Arkansas Location within the United States
- Nearest city: Floyd, Arkansas
- Coordinates: 35°11′31″N 91°58′1″W
- Area: less than one acre
- Built: 1880
- Architectural style: Vernacular, Single Pile, Central Hall Plan
- MPS: White County MPS
- NRHP reference No.: 91001322
- Added to NRHP: July 11, 1992

The Ackins House was a historic house in Floyd, Arkansas. Located on the east side of Arkansas Highway 31 just north of its intersection with Arkansas Highway 305, it was one of the small number of early houses to survive in White County at the time it was listed as a historic site.

== Description and history ==
Built around 1880, it was a 1 1/2-story timber-framed single pile structure with a central hall plan. A hip-roofed porch extends across much of the main facade, supported by turned posts. Despite later alterations, it was one of the best-preserved houses of this type in the county.

The house was listed on the National Register of Historic Places on July 11, 1992. It has been listed as destroyed in the Arkansas Historic Preservation Program database.

== See also ==
- National Register of Historic Places listings in White County, Arkansas
