= Woodlawn, Arkansas =

Woodlawn, Arkansas may refer to:

- Woodlawn, Cleveland County, Arkansas, a census-designated place in Cleveland County
- Woodlawn, Lonoke County, Arkansas, an unincorporated community in Lonoke County
