= Arkansas Highway 321 =

State highway in Arkansas, United States

Highway 321

Route information
- Maintained by ArDOT

Section 1
- Length: 11.20 mi (18.02 km)
- South end: I-57 / US 67 / US 167 / AR 5 / AR 367 in Cabot
- North end: AR 38

Section 2
- Length: 3.79 mi (6.10 km)
- South end: AR 31
- North end: AR 267

Location
- Country: United States
- State: Arkansas
- Counties: Lonoke, White

Highway system
- Arkansas Highway System; Interstate; US; State; Business; Spurs; Suffixed; Scenic; Heritage
← AR 320	→ AR 322

Highway 321 (AR 321, Ark. 321, Hwy. 321) is a designation for two north–south state highways in central Arkansas. One route of 11.20 miles (18.02 km) runs from Interstate 57 (I-57) in Cabot north to Highway 38 east of Austin. A second route of 3.79 miles (6.10 km) begins at AR 31 north of Beebe and runs north to Highway 267.

== Route description ==
=== Cabot to Austin ===
Highway 321 begins near an interchange with I-57/US 67/US 167 at Highway 5 and Highway 367 in Cabot. The route intersects Highway 89 in south Cabot before exiting the city and running due east. Near Oak Grove, the route turns due north, with Highway 321 Spur (AR 321S) continuing east to Highway 31. A 2010 study of annual average daily traffic (AADT) by the Arkansas State Highway and Transportation Department (AHTD) reveals that about 19,000 vehicles per day (VPD) use the route between its southern terminus and Highway 89/Highway 367, with the traffic count dropping to 7,000 VPD between that junction and the Cabot city limits. Traffic counts continue around 2,500 VPD until the Highway 321S junction, then drop to 2,100 VPD for the remainder of the route.

=== Beebe to Essex ===
Highway 321 begins north of Beebe at Highway 31. The route runs north, having a junction with Highway 321 Spur and passing through Essex. The highway continues north and terminates at Highway 267. An AHTD traffic count from 2010 reveals that the average annual daily traffic never exceeds 640 vehicles per day anywhere on the route.

== Major intersections ==
County	Location	mi	km	Destinations	Notes
Lonoke	Cabot	0.00	0.00	I-57 / US 67 / US 167 / AR 5 north / AR 367 north – Heber Springs, Little Rock	Southern terminus; exit 16 on I-57
Lonoke	Cabot	3.24	5.21	AR 89 (Pine Street)	
Lonoke		7.75	12.47	AR 321S east to AR 31 – Lonoke	
Lonoke		11.20	18.02	AR 38 – Cabot, Hickory Plains	Northern terminus
Gap in route
White		0.00	0.00	AR 31	
White		2.41	3.88	AR 321S south	
White		3.79	6.10	AR 276	Northern terminus
1.000 mi = 1.609 km; 1.000 km = 0.621 mi

== Special routes ==
=== Lonoke County spur ===
Highway 321S
- Location: Lonoke County
- Length: 3.15 mi (5.07 km)

Highway 321 Spur (AR 321S, Ark. 321S, and Hwy. 321S) is an east–west state highway spur route in Lonoke County. The route of 3.15 miles (5.07 km) serves as a connector between Highway 321 and Highway 31.

==== Major intersections ====
The entire route is in Lonoke County.

Location	mi	km	Destinations	Notes
	0.00	0.00	AR 321 – Cabot, Sylvania	Western terminus
	3.15	5.07	AR 31 – Beebe, Lonoke	Eastern terminus
1.000 mi = 1.609 km; 1.000 km = 0.621 mi

=== White County spur ===
Highway 321S
- Location: White County
- Length: 0.35 mi (560 m)

Highway 321 Spur (AR 321S, Ark. 321S, and Hwy. 321S) is an east–west state highway spur route in White County. The route of 0.35 miles (0.56 km) serves as a short connector between Highway 321 and Highway 31.

==== Major intersections ====
The entire route is in White County.

Location	mi	km	Destinations	Notes
	0.35	0.56	AR 31	Southern terminus
	0.00	0.00	AR 321	Northern terminus
1.000 mi = 1.609 km; 1.000 km = 0.621 mi

== See also ==
- List of state highways in Arkansas
