= Arkansas Highway 89 =

State highway in Arkansas, United States

Highway 89

Route information
- Maintained by ArDOT

Section 1
- Length: 25.12 mi (40.43 km)
- South end: US 70 / AR 31 in Lonoke
- Major intersections: I-40 in Lonoke; I-57 / US 67 / US 167 in Cabot
- North end: AR 107 at Zion Hill

Section 2
- Length: 16.17 mi (26.02 km)
- South end: Sayles Road at the Pulaski County line
- Major intersections: I-40 / US 65 / AR 365 in Mayflower
- North end: Lollie Road near Mayflower

Location
- Country: United States
- State: Arkansas
- Counties: Lonoke, Pulaski, Faulkner

Highway system
- Arkansas Highway System; Interstate; US; State; Business; Spurs; Suffixed; Scenic; Heritage
← AR 88	→ AR 90

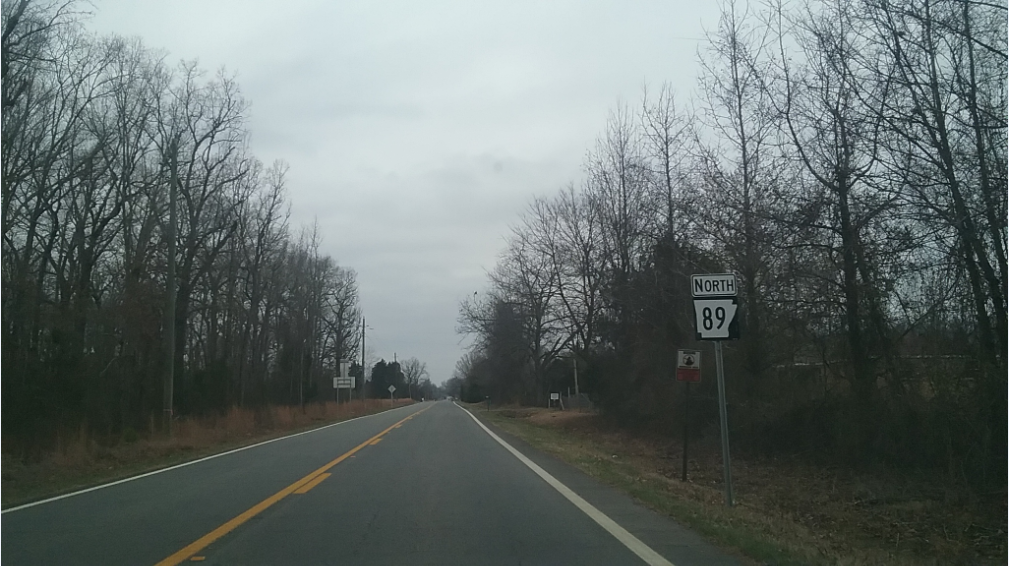
AR 89 east of Mayflower

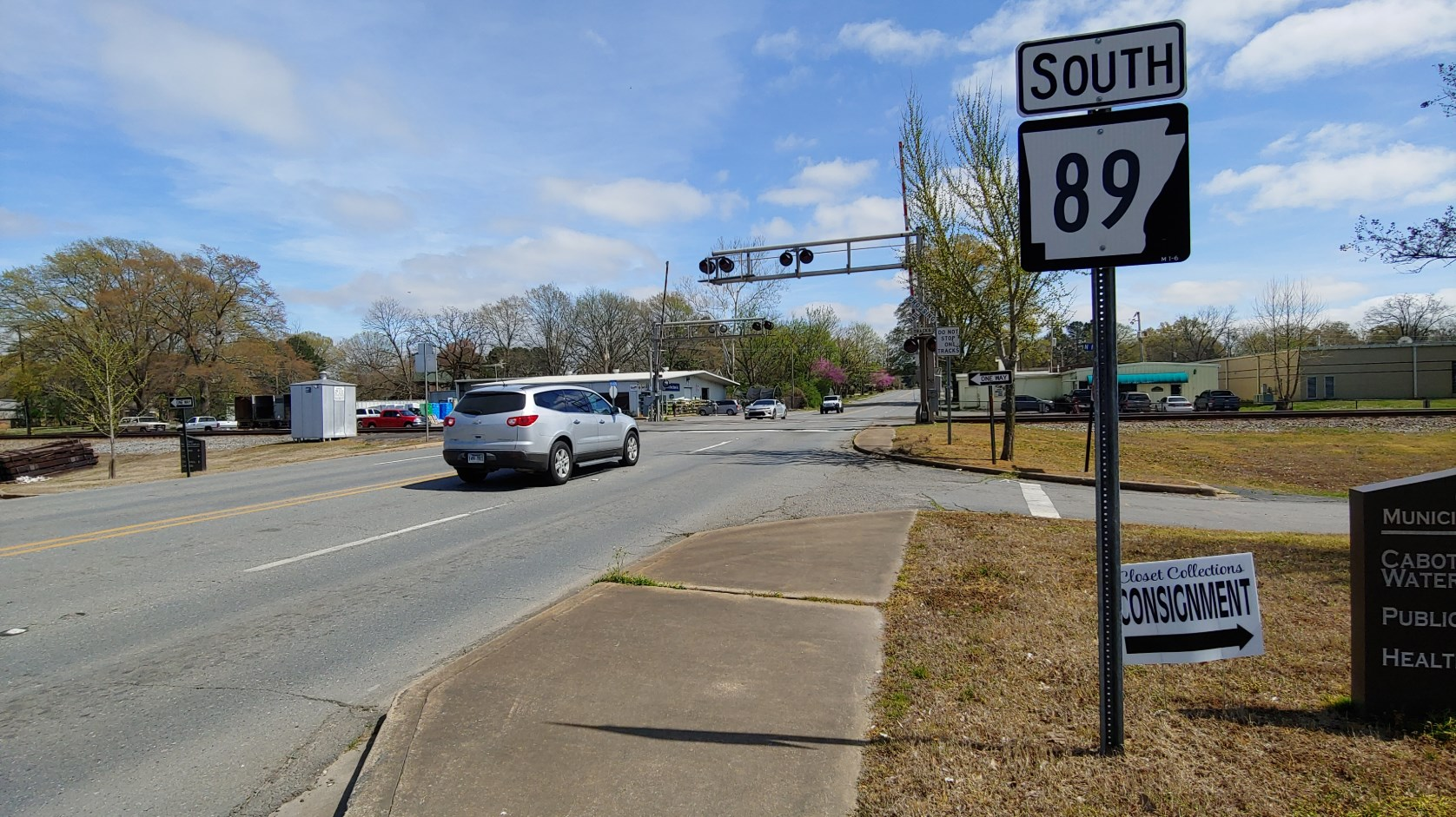
AR 89 in Cabot looking south

Arkansas Highway 89 (AR 89) is a designation for two state highways in Central Arkansas.

== Route description ==
AR 89's southern terminus is at an intersection with U.S. Highway 70 (US 70) near the western end of Lonoke. From there, it runs seven miles (11 km) north and west to Furlow, intersecting AR 15 and AR 294, then 8 1/2 miles (13.7 km) miles north to AR 367 at Cabot, the largest city through which the highway runs. Within Cabot, it serves as a portion of two major commercial thoroughfares—first as South Pine Street from city limits into downtown, then turning westward as West Main Street. From Cabot, it runs approximately six miles (9.7 km) west crossing AR 5 at the Pulaski–Lonoke county line before ending at AR 107 eight miles (13 km) south of Vilonia.

It resumes at the Pulaski–Faulkner county line as a continuation of Sayles Road and runs west another 11 miles (18 km) before intersecting I-40 and AR 365 one mile (1.6 km) north of Mayflower. From there, it continues west approximately five miles (8.0 km) before continuing as Lollie Road.

== Improvements ==
Within the Mayflower area, the highway gained a significant realignment to include a new overpass over the Union Pacific Railroad line, a $26.3 million project in planning since 1983. A resolution for shared financing of the overpass and realignment — which will also remove concurrency with AR 365 in the city and partially run back into unincorporated Faulkner County — was passed by the Mayflower city council in 2018, entering the city into partnership with the Arkansas Department of Transportation, Faulkner County, and the regional governmental council Metroplan. A groundbreaking for construction of the new pathway was held on May 25, 2021. The project was officially completed as in May 2023, with the highway's prior alignment west of AR 365 ceded to the City of Mayflower.

== Major intersections ==
County	Location	mi	km	Destinations	Notes
Lonoke	Lonoke	0.00	0.00	US 70 (AR 31)	Southern terminus
Lonoke	Lonoke	1.46	2.35	I-40 – Little Rock, West Memphis	Exit 173 on I-40
Lonoke	Furlow	6.66	10.72	AR 15 south / AR 294 west to I-40 – Jacksonville	Northern terminus of AR 15; eastern terminus of AR 294
Lonoke		8.86	14.26	AR 236 east (Graham Road)	Western terminus of AR 236
Lonoke	Cabot	14.56	23.43	AR 321 (Bill Foster Memorial Highway) – Camp Nelson Confederate Cemetery	
Lonoke	Cabot	17.36	27.94	AR 367 – Austin	Former US 67
Lonoke	Cabot	18.51	29.79	I-57 / US 67 / US 167 – Little Rock, Beebe, St Louis	Exit 19 on I-57
Lonoke	Cabot	20.80	33.47	AR 5 to US 64 / AR 107 – Jacksonville	
Pulaski	Zion Hill	25.12	40.43	AR 107 – North Little Rock, Vilonia	Northern terminus
Gap in route
Faulkner		0.00	0.00	Sayles Road	Continuation into Pulaski County
Faulkner	Mayflower	11.03– 11.16	17.75– 17.96	I-40 (US 65) / AR 365 – Little Rock, Conway	Interchange; exit 135 on I-40
Faulkner		16.17	26.02	Lollie Road	Continuation west
1.000 mi = 1.609 km; 1.000 km = 0.621 mi

== Lonoke spur ==
Highway 89S
- Location: Lonoke
- Length: 0.29 mi (470 m)
- Existed: November 23, 1966–August 19, 2014

Arkansas Highway 89 Spur is a former spur route in Lonoke. 0.29 miles (0.47 km) in length, it was established in 1966 and deleted from the state highway system in 2014.

Major intersections
The entire route was in Lonoke, Lonoke County.

mi	km	Destinations	Notes
0.29	0.47	US 70 (AR 31)	Southern terminus
0.00	0.00	AR 89	Northern terminus
1.000 mi = 1.609 km; 1.000 km = 0.621 mi
