= Floyd Cotton Gin =

- U.S. National Register of Historic Places
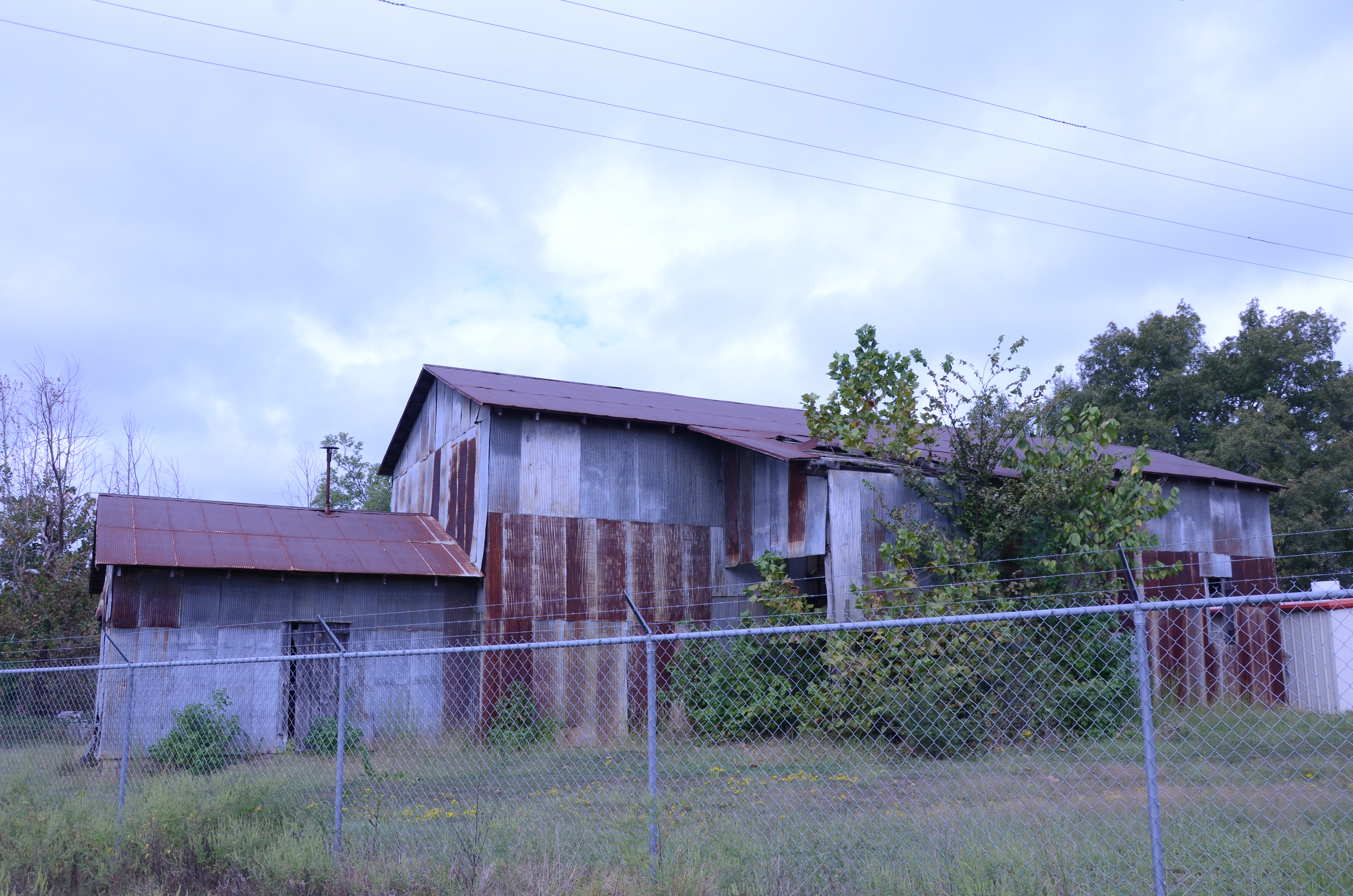

- Location within Arkansas Location within the United States
- Nearest city: Floyd, Arkansas
- Coordinates: 35°11′29″N 91°58′4″W
- Area: less than one acre
- Built: 1932
- Architectural style: Vernacular rectangular industrial
- MPS: White County MPS
- NRHP reference No.: 91001324
- Added to NRHP: July 12, 1992

The Floyd Cotton Gin was a historic cotton gin at the junction of Arkansas Highway 31 and Arkansas Highway 305 in Floyd, Arkansas, USA. It was a two-story wood-frame building roughly L-shaped with a single-story section extending its southern end and a two-story section projecting east under a continuation of the sloping gabled roof. This gin was built in the 1930s, when White County was one of the nation's leading producers of cotton. Before being demolished, it was one of five gins in the county to survive from that period. In early 2022, the cotton gin was demolished for unknown reasons.

The gin was listed on the National Register of Historic Places in 1992.

== See also ==
- National Register of Historic Places listings in White County, Arkansas
