= Arkansas Highway 236 =

State highway in Arkansas, United States

Highway 236

Route information
- Maintained by ArDOT
- Length: 12.51 mi (20.13 km)

Major junctions
- West end: AR 89
- AR 31
- East end: AR 13

Location
- Country: United States
- State: Arkansas
- Counties: Lonoke

Highway system
- Arkansas Highway System; Interstate; US; State; Business; Spurs; Suffixed; Scenic; Heritage
← AR 235	→ AR 237

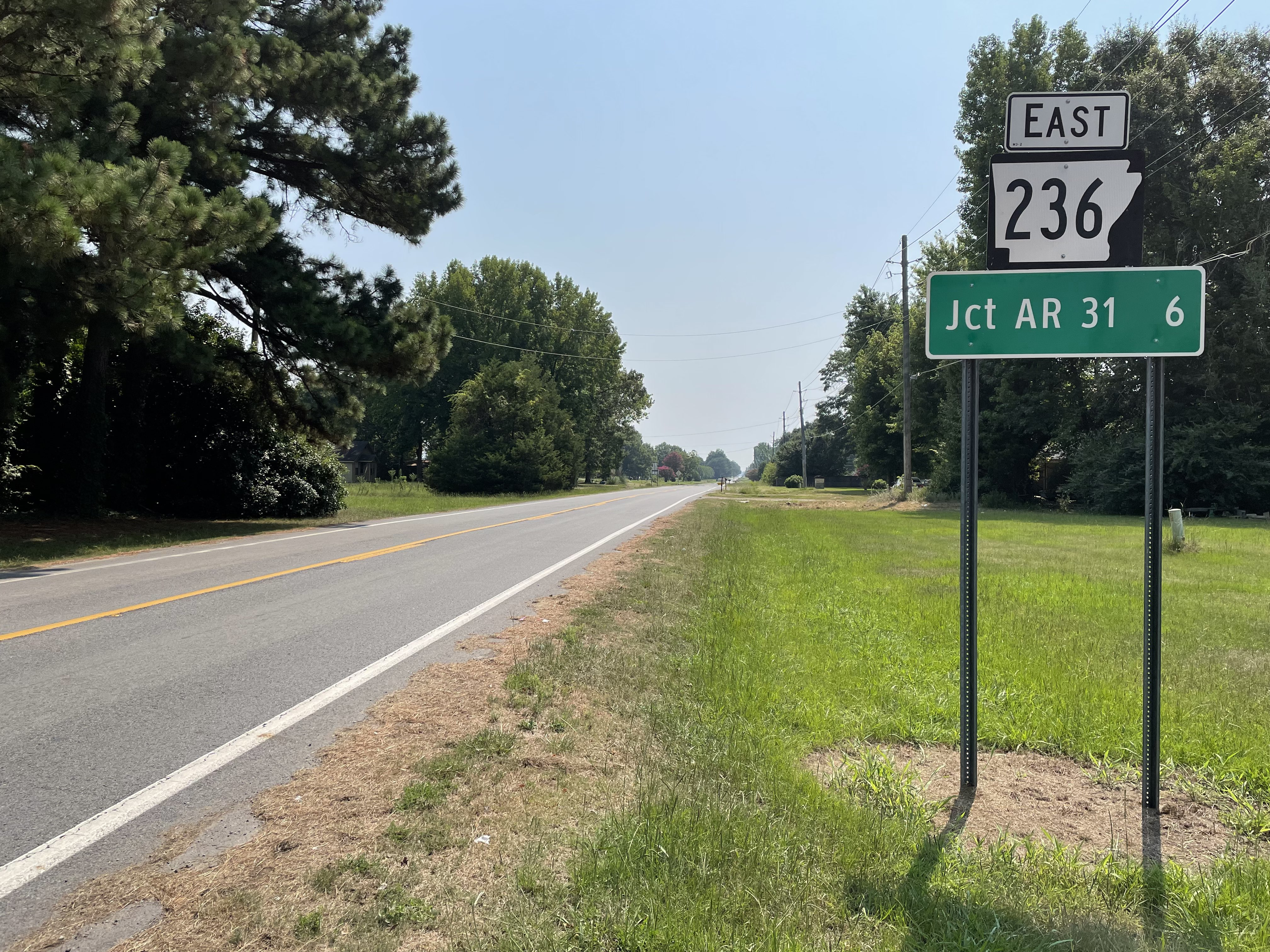
State Highway 236 at the intersection of Arkansas Highway 89 south of Cabot, Arkansas

Arkansas Highway 236 (AR 236 and Hwy. 236) is an east–west state highway in Lonoke County. The route of 12.51 miles (20.13 km) connects Highway 89 and Highway 13 including a concurrency with Highway 31.

== Route description ==
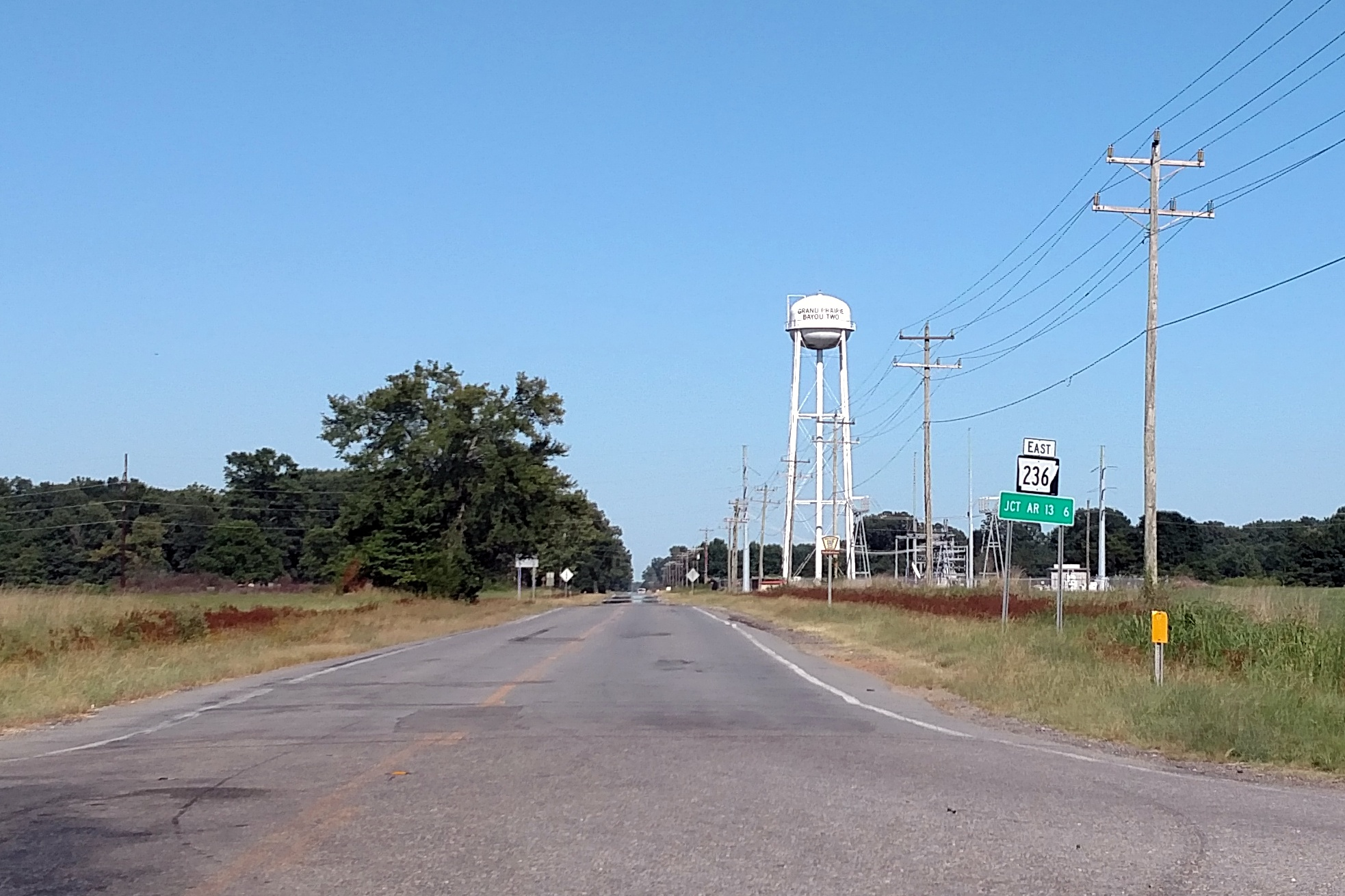
Highway 236 near Lonoke, July 2015

The route begins at Highway 89 north of Furlow. Highway 236 runs due east through Fairview to form a concurrency north with Highway 31. The route breaks from Highway 31 and runs due east to meet Highway 13, where it terminates.

== Major intersections ==
The entire route is in Lonoke County.

Location	mi	km	Destinations	Notes
	0.00	0.00	AR 89 – Lonoke, Cabot	Western terminus
	6.10	9.82	AR 31 south – Lonoke	
AR 31 concurrency north, 3.0 miles (4.8 km)
	0.00	0.00	AR 31 north – Beebe	
Waterproof	6.33	10.19	AR 13 – Hickory Plains, Carlisle	Eastern terminus
1.000 mi = 1.609 km; 1.000 km = 0.621 mi

== See also ==
- List of state highways in Arkansas
