= Southwest Trail =

19th-century pioneer route

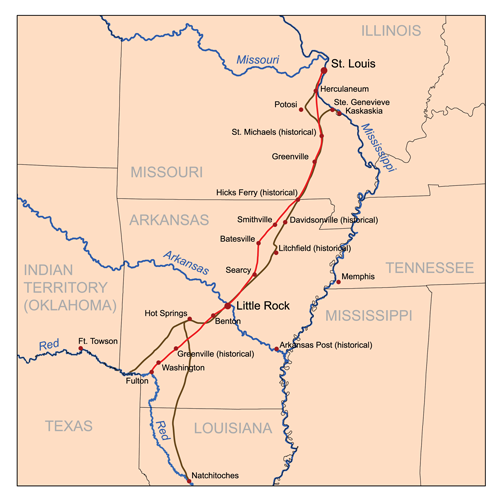
Map showing the Southwest Trail or Military Road as it was in the mid-1800s (in red) and the Natchitoches Trace that it replaced (in brown).

The Southwest Trail was a 19th-century pioneer route that was the primary passageway for American settlers bound for Texas.

== History ==
The Southwest Trail, also known as the Old Military Road, replaced the older Natchitoches Trace, which ran from the mouth of the Missouri River, near present-day St. Louis, Missouri to present-day Fulton, Arkansas on the Red River. From Fulton, another American Indian trace followed the Red River to Natchitoches, Louisiana.

Southwest Trail was a general term for a network of trails linking St. Louis and Ste-Geneviève, Missouri to the Red River Valley of Texas. European American pioneers improved and expanded the older route. At the time of Americans' first settling the Texas territory, the Red River was the border between Mexico and the United States.

Little more than a footpath before Arkansas became a territory in 1819, Southwest Trail became a major immigration route in the 1820s. By the 1830s more than 80 percent of the Arkansas territory's population had entered through the Southwest Trail. The U.S. Army improved the military road during Andrew Jackson's presidency.

Usage of the trail north of the Arkansas River declined in the late 1800s, but the trail south of the river remained in use decades longer.

== Route ==
From the St. Louis and Ste-Geneviève areas, the trail passed through Wayne County, Missouri. The Indian trace was the southern route of two followed by Cherokees and their enslaved Africans during the Trail of Tears.

From its origin as a footpath, to a series of rugged roads, highways follow much of the route today. Southwest Trail enters Arkansas on Arkansas Highway 166, north of Maynard, (Randolph County). It then passes through communities of Attica, Pocahontas, Imboden, Smithville, Jesup, Strawberry and Walnut Grove.

Two routes were used by pioneers en route to Southside. The older, eastern trail passes through Davidsonville, Newark and Oil Trough. Davidsonville was a pioneer key town on the Black River, but frequent flooding led to use of a newer, western route that passes through Sulphur Rock and crosses the White River at Batesville.

From Southside, the trail follows U.S. Route 167 to Pleasant Plains, then Arkansas Highway 157 to Sunnydale, then Arkansas Highway 124 to Arkansas Highway 305 to Arkansas Highway 16 to Letona Road to Mount Pisgah Road to Morris School Road to Arkansas Highway 36 to Center Hill, then Arkansas Highway 305 to Floyd, then El Paso Road to Arkansas Highway 5 through El Paso to Arkansas Highway 89, then Tate's Mill Road to Batesville Pike Road through Gibson to Remount Road to Arkansas Highway 176 to Arkansas Highway 365 through North Little Rock.

Southwest Trail crosses the Arkansas River on U.S. Route 70, through Little Rock to Arkansas Highway 5 through Bryant and Benton to U.S. Route 70, then Arkansas Highway 229 to U.S. Route 67. At Fairplay it takes Old Military Road to Rockport, where pioneers forded the Ouachita River.

From Rockport it takes Arkansas Highway 84 to Social Hill, then Old Military Road to U.S. Route 67 at Midway, to Caddo Valley, then crosses the Caddo River on Arkansas Highway 7 to Old Military Road, to Arkansas Highway 8 then Mount Olive Road to Hollywood, then Arkansas Highway 26 to Antoine, then Arkansas Highway 29 to Arkansas Highway 19, returns to Arkansas Highway 29 through Blevins, to Arkansas Highway 32, then U.S. Route 278 to Washington. It then follows Arkansas Highway 195 to Fulton, and crosses the Red River on U.S. Route 67. It continues to Mandeville, turns off on Rondo Road to Rondo, then takes U.S. Route 82 west to the current Arkansas-Texas border of Texarkana.

The trail is commemorated in the Historic Washington State Park, northwest of Hope. Washington was a key trading point near the southwest end of the trail.
