= Staggs–Huffaker Building =

- U.S. National Register of Historic Places
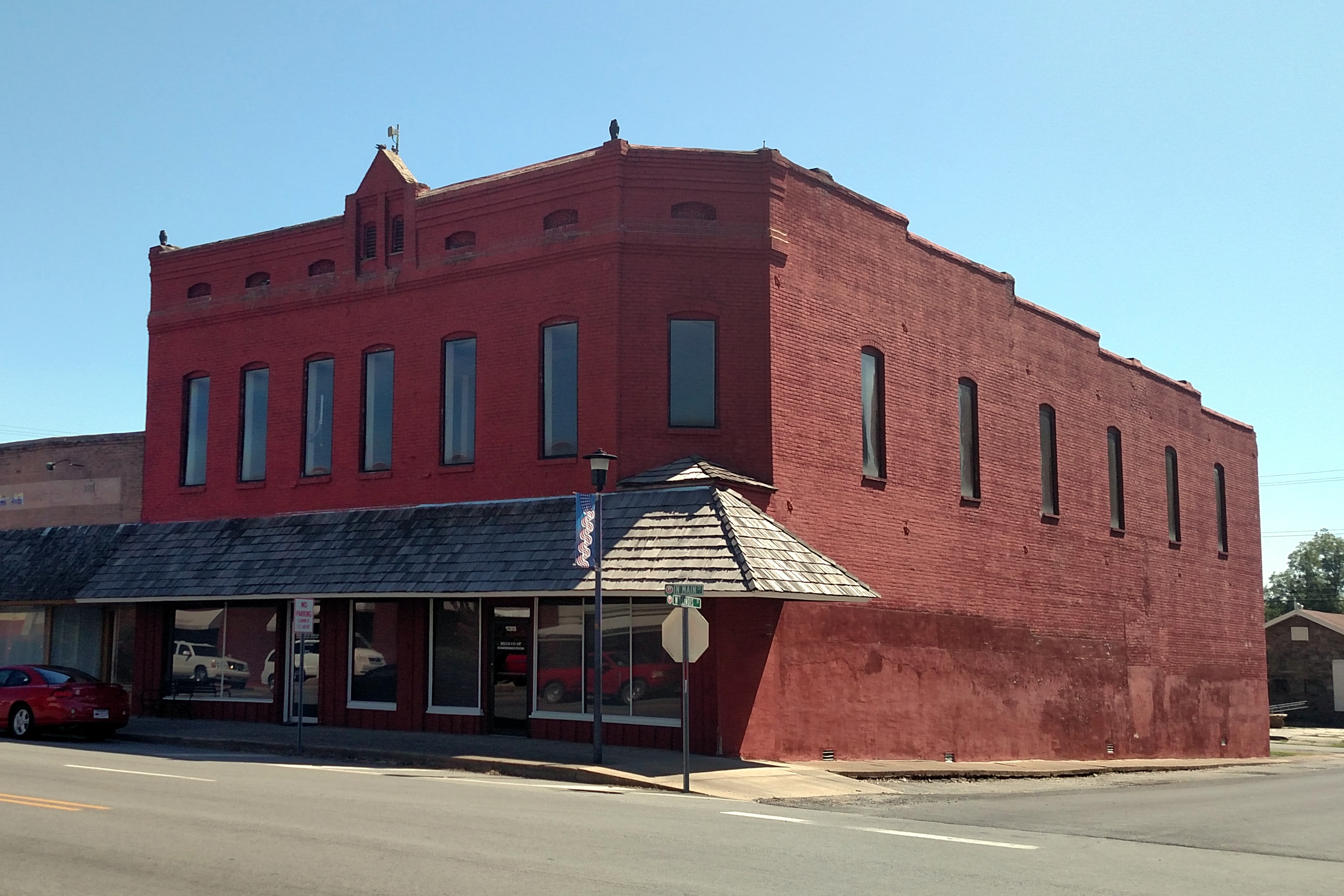

- Location within Arkansas Location within the United States
- Location: Jct. of N. Main and W. Illinois Sts., Beebe, Arkansas
- Coordinates: 35°4′15″N 91°52′50″W
- Area: less than one acre
- Built: 1880
- Architectural style: Vernacular commercial
- MPS: White County MPS
- NRHP reference No.: 91001250
- Added to NRHP: September 5, 1991

The Staggs–Huffaker Building is a historic commercial building at North Main and West Illinois Streets in Beebe, Arkansas. It is a two-story vernacular brick building, with an angled corner bay. The Main Street facade has a wood-shingled awning extending across the first floor. There is brick corbelling above the second level, and a gabled parapet above. Built about 1880, it is one of a small number of commercial buildings to survive from the city's early railroad-related development.

The building was listed on the National Register of Historic Places in 1991.

== See also ==
- National Register of Historic Places listings in White County, Arkansas
