= Arkansas Highway 367 =

State highway in Arkansas, United States

Highway 367

Route information
- Maintained by ArDOT

Section 1
- Length: 15.03 mi (24.19 km)
- South end: US 167 at East End
- North end: US 70 / AR 365 in Little Rock

Section 2
- Length: 81.52 mi (131.19 km)
- South end: I-57 / US 67 / US 167 / AR 5 / AR 321 in Cabot
- North end: US 67B / US 412B / AR 34 in Walnut Ridge

Location
- Country: United States
- State: Arkansas
- Counties: Southern segment: Saline, Pulaski; Northern segment: Lonoke, White, Jackson, Independence, Lawrence

Highway system
- Arkansas Highway System; Interstate; US; State; Business; Spurs; Suffixed; Scenic; Heritage
← AR 366	→ AR 368

Arkansas Highway 367 (AR 367) is a designation for two state highways in Arkansas. One segment of 15.03 miles (24.19 km) runs from U.S. Route 167 (US 167) at East End north to US 70 in Little Rock. A second segment of 81.52 miles (131.19 km) runs from Interstate 57 (I-57) in Cabot north to US 412B in Walnut Ridge.

== Route description ==
=== East End to Little Rock ===
The southern segment begins at East End at an intersection with US 167. Its northern terminus is an intersection with US 70/Highway 365 (Roosevelt Road) in Little Rock. Traveling generally south to north, it is a former alignment of US 167. It is commonly known as Arch Street or Arch Street Pike after the Little Rock street.

=== Cabot to Walnut Ridge ===
The northern segment begins at an intersection with Highway 5 and Highway 321 near I-57/US 67/US 167 in Cabot. Its northern terminus is in Walnut Ridge at an intersection with US 67B/US 412B and Highway 34. Traveling mostly southwest to northeast, it is a former alignment of US 67.

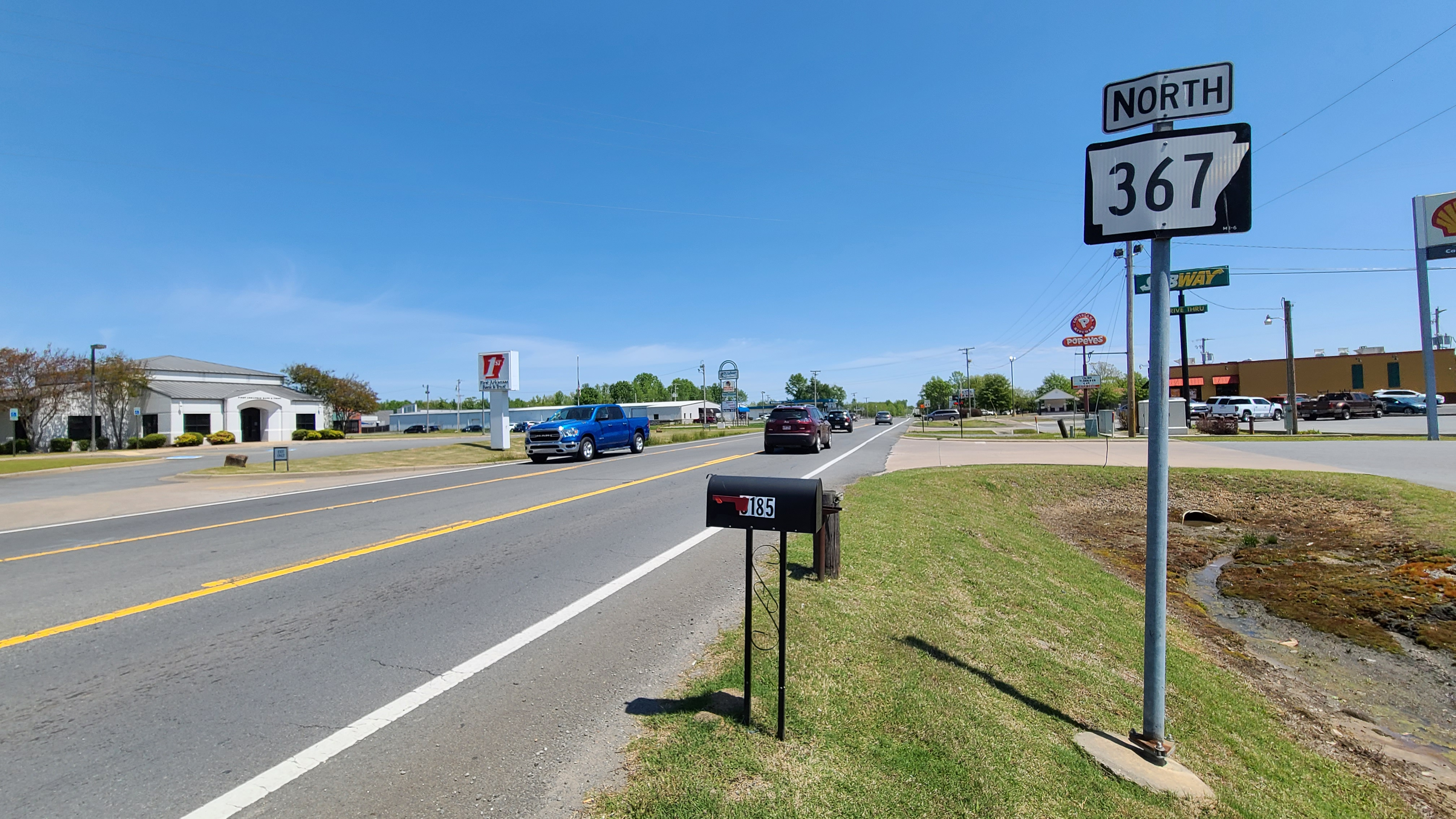
Highway 367 located at its southern terminus in Cabot facing north.

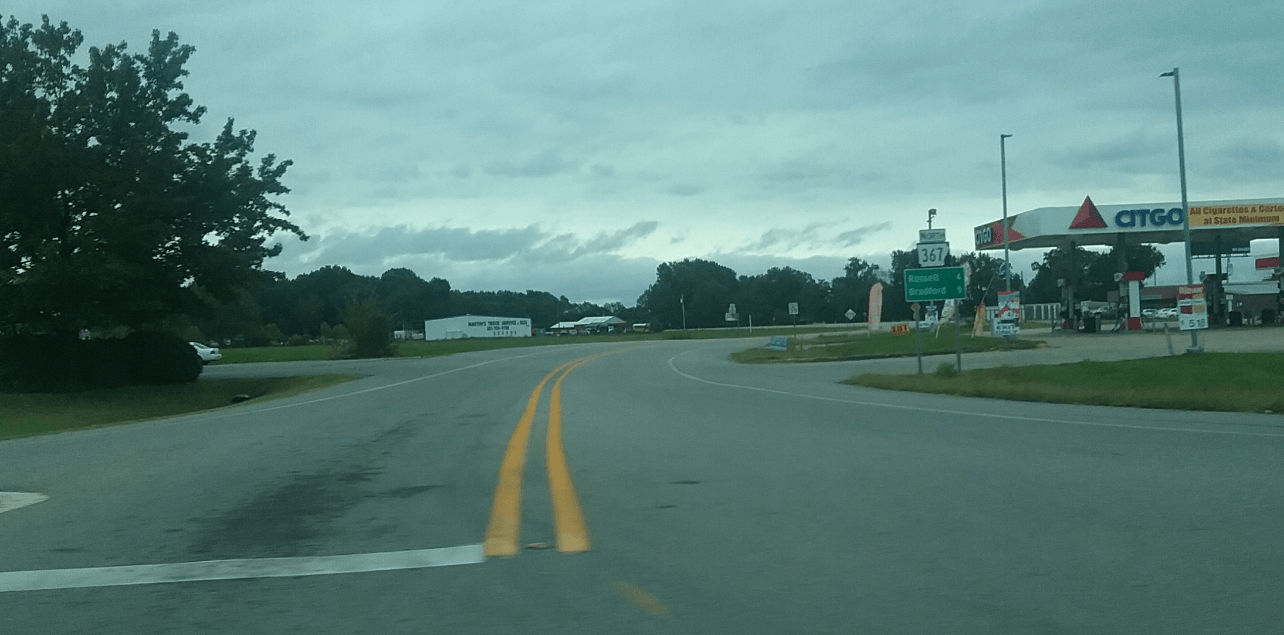
Highway 367 in Bald Knob, September 2017.

== Major intersections ==
County	Location	mi	km	Destinations	Notes
Saline	East End	0.0	0.0	US 167 to I-530 (US 65) – Sheridan, Little Rock	Southern terminus
Pulaski		9.6	15.4	AR 338 east to I-530 (US 65 / US 167) – Sweet Home	Western terminus of AR 338
Pulaski	Little Rock	10.5	16.9	AR 338 west (Baseline Road)	Eastern terminus of AR 338
Pulaski	Little Rock	15.0	24.1	US 70 / AR 365 (Roosevelt Road)	Northern terminus; former US 65/US 67
Gap in route
Lonoke	Cabot	0.0	0.0	I-57 / US 67 / US 167 / AR 5 north / AR 321 north – Heber Springs, Little Rock, Beebe	Southern terminus; southern termini of AR 5 and AR 321; exit 16 on I-57
Lonoke	Cabot	3.3	5.3	AR 89 to I-57 / US 67 (US 167)	
Lonoke	Cabot	4.7	7.6	AR 38 – Des Arc	
Lonoke	Austin	5.8	9.3	AR 305 to I-57 / US 67 (US 167)	
Lonoke	Ward	8.3	13.4	AR 319 south	Northern terminus of AR 319
Lonoke	Ward	8.7	14.0	AR 319 north	Southern terminus of AR 319
White	Beebe	12.4	20.0	US 67B to US 64 west – Little Rock, Conway	
White	Beebe	13.1	21.1	AR 367S north to I-57 / US 67 (US 64 / US 167)	Southern terminus of AR 367S
White	Beebe	14.2	22.9	US 67B / AR 31 – Antioch, Lonoke	
White	McRae	18.6	29.9	AR 13 north	Southern terminus of AR 13
White	Morning Sun	26.3	42.3	AR 11 south – Higginson, Griffithville, Des Arc	Northern terminus of AR 11
White	Searcy	27.2	43.8	I-57 / US 64 / US 67 / US 167 – Bald Knob, McRae, Little Rock	Exit 42 on I-57
White	Searcy	27.2	43.8	US 67B north	Continuation north
White	Searcy	Gap in route			
White	Searcy	0.0	0.0	US 67B (South Main Street)	Southern terminus
White	Searcy	0.6	0.97	AR 267 south (Queensway Street)	Northern terminus of AR 267
White	Searcy	0.8	1.3	I-57 / US 64 / US 67 / US 167 – Bald Knob, Beebe, Little Rock, St. Louis	Exit 44 on I-57
White	Searcy	2.4	3.9	I-57 / US 67 (US 64 / US 167) / AR 36 west – Searcy	Eastern terminus of AR 36; exit 45 on I-57
White	Searcy	4.0	6.4	AR 36 – Kensett	
White	Judsonia	5.6	9.0	AR 385 to I-57 / US 67 (US 64 / US 167) – Judsonia, Plainview	
White	Judsonia	7.3	11.7	AR 13 north	Southern terminus of AR 13
White	Judsonia	7.6	12.2	AR 385 south	Northern terminus of AR 385
White	Judsonia	7.8	12.6	AR 157 north – Plainview, Providence	Southern terminus of AR 157
White	Judsonia	8.4	13.5	AR 323	
White	Bald Knob	12.4	20.0	US 64 to I-57 / US 67 / US 167 – Memphis	Northern terminus
White	Bald Knob	Gap in route			
White	Bald Knob	0.0	0.0	US 167 to I-57 / US 67 – Batesville	Southern terminus
White	Bald Knob	0.9	1.4	AR 258 (Pumping Station Road)	
White	Bradford	9.5	15.3	AR 87 – Denmark	
Jackson	No major junctions				
Independence	No major junctions				
Jackson		25.6	41.2	AR 14 west – Batesville	Southern end of AR 14 concurrency
Jackson	Newport			Newport Bridge over White River	
Jackson	Newport	27.8	44.7	AR 69 north – Jacksonport, Jacksonport State Park	Southern terminus of AR 69
Jackson	Newport	28.8	46.3	AR 14 east (State Street)	Northern end of AR 14 concurrency
Jackson	Newport	29.4	47.3	AR 384 east	Western terminus of AR 384
Jackson	Newport–Diaz line	31.5	50.7	AR 18 to I-57 / US 67	
Jackson	Diaz	32.7	52.6	AR 157 north	Southern terminus of AR 157
Jackson	Tuckerman	38.2	61.5	AR 37 north – Elgin	Southern terminus of AR 37
Jackson	Tuckerman	38.7	62.3	AR 37 south to I-57 / US 67	Northern terminus of AR 37
Jackson	Tuckerman	39.0	62.8	AR 145 north	Southern terminus of AR 145
Jackson		40.1	64.5	AR 224 east	Western terminus of AR 224
Jackson		44.2	71.1	AR 226 east to US 78	
Lawrence	Alicia	51.6	83.0	AR 230 east – Bono	Western terminus of AR 230
Lawrence	Minturn	58.0	93.3	AR 228 west – Clover Bend	Eastern terminus of AR 228
Lawrence	Hoxie	63.0	101.4	US 63 / US 412 – Jonesboro, Imboden, Paragould, Hardy	
Lawrence	Hoxie	63.7	102.5	US 63B north	Southern end of US 63B concurrency
Lawrence	Hoxie	64.0	103.0	US 63B south	Northern end of US 63B concurrency
Lawrence	Walnut Ridge	65.7	105.7	US 67B north / US 412B (Main Street) / AR 34 east (Front Street)	Northern terminus; southern terminus of US 67B; western terminus of AR 34
1.000 mi = 1.609 km; 1.000 km = 0.621 mi: Concurrency terminus

== Beebe spur ==
Highway 367S
- Location: Beebe, Arkansas
- Length: 0.49 mi (790 m)

Highway 367 Spur (AR 367S, Hwy. 367S) is a spur route of 0.49 miles (0.79 km) in Beebe, Arkansas.

Its northern terminus is at an intersection with I-57/US 64/US 67/US 167 north of Beebe. Arkansas. Its southern terminus is in Beebe at an intersection with Highway 367.

== See also ==
- U.S. Route 67 in Arkansas
- U.S. Route 167
