= Arkansas Highway 5 =

Highway in Arkansas

Highway 5

Route information
- Maintained by ArDOT
- Existed: 1926–present

Southern segment
- Length: 45.84 mi (73.77 km)
- West end: US 70 / US 70B near Hot Springs
- Major intersections: I-30 / US 67 / US 70 / AR 35 in Benton
- East end: I-430 / US 70 in Little Rock

Main Street Bridge segment
- Length: 0.38 mi (610 m)
- South end: Scott Street in Little Rock
- North end: Main Street in North Little Rock

Northern segment
- Length: 146.63 mi (235.98 km)
- South end: I-57 / US 67 / US 167 / AR 321 / AR 367 in Cabot
- Major intersections: US 64 near El Paso; US 62 / US 412 near Mountain Home
- North end: Route 5 at the Missouri state line near Three Brothers

Location
- Country: United States
- State: Arkansas
- Counties: Garland, Saline, Pulaski, Lonoke, White, Cleburne, Stone, Izard, Baxter

Highway system
- Arkansas Highway System; Interstate; US; State; Business; Spurs; Suffixed; Scenic; Heritage
← AR 4	→ AR 6

Arkansas Highway 5 (AR 5) is a designation for three state highways in Arkansas. The southern segment of 45.84 miles (73.77 km) runs from U.S. Route 70 (US 70) east of Hot Springs north to Interstate 430 (I-430) in Little Rock.

A northern segment of 146.63 miles (235.98 km) runs from I-57 in Cabot north to the Missouri state line, including a lengthy overlap with Highway 25 between Heber Springs and Wolf Bayou. A portion of this route is designated as part of the Sylamore Scenic Byway. This segment also contained a former spur route in Mountain Home.

The Main Street Bridge in Little Rock carries a third, unsigned, Highway 5 designation. The bridge is 0.38 miles (0.61 km) in span.

All three routes are maintained by the Arkansas Department of Transportation (ArDOT).

== Route description ==
=== Hot Springs to Little Rock ===
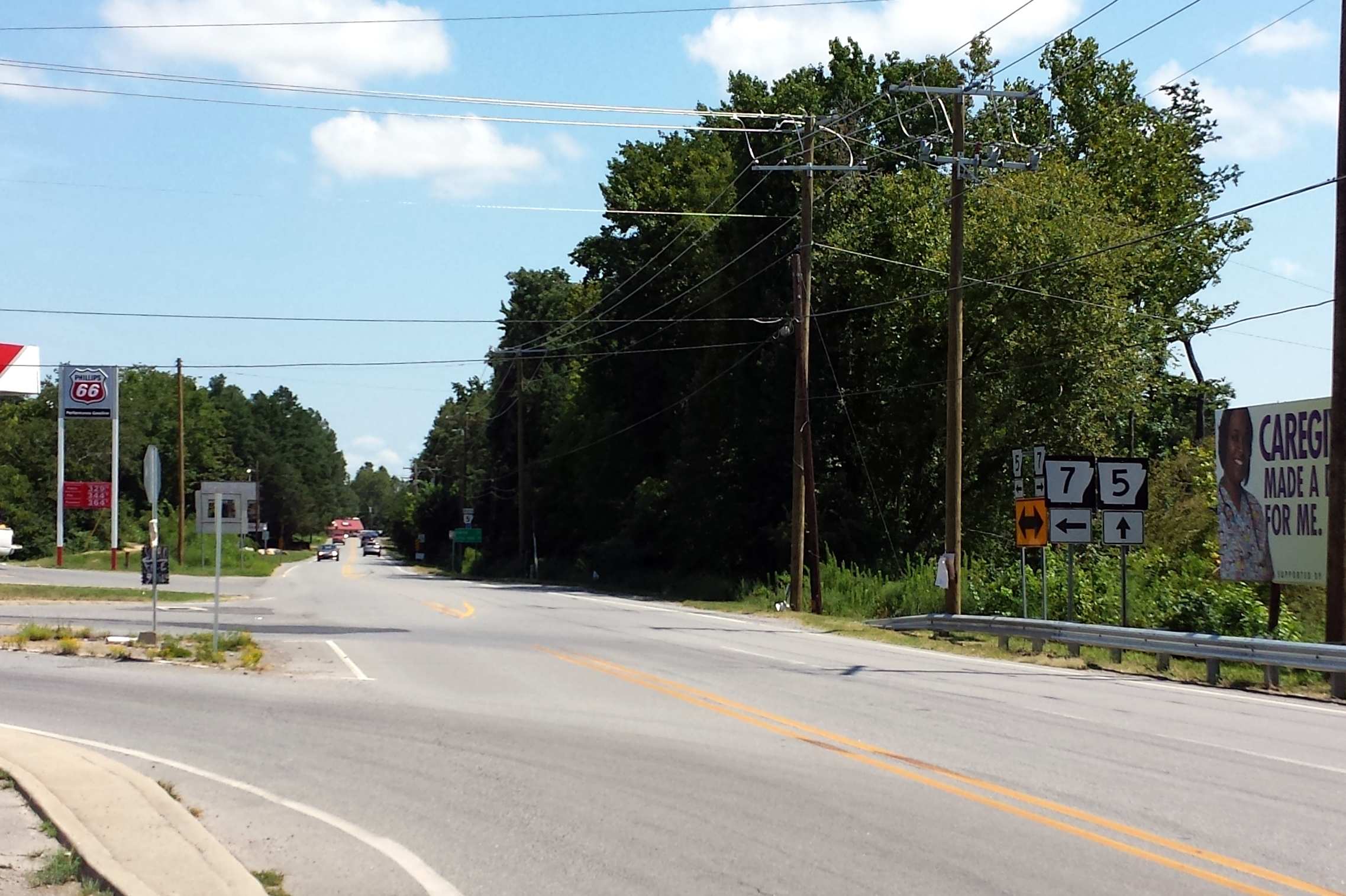
Old photo of Highway 5 and Highway 7 junction near Hot Springs, the former southern terminus. This junction was replaced by a roundabout in 2023 to connect to the new Hot Springs Bypass extension.

Highway 5 begins at an interchange with US 70 and US 70B east of Hot Springs as a two-lane freeway. The route meets Highway 7 in Fountain Lake at a roundabout and continues to northeast as a surface road. In the city of Fountain Lake, Highway 5 has a junction with Highway 128 before entering Saline County and Hot Springs Village. Continuing east, the route serves as the southern terminus for Highway 9 at Crows. Northwest of Benton, Highway 5 has a junction with Highway 298 before entering the city and passing several residential subdivisions. Near Saline Memorial Hospital, the route has a junction with I-30/US 67/US 70 and Highway 35. Highway 5 runs east as a frontage road paralleling I-30 toward Little Rock. Highway 35 runs south toward downtown Benton and eventually Sheridan and Monticello.

The route passes the Hester-Lenz House, listed on the National Register of Historic Places (NRHP), prior to the Bryant city limits. An intersection with Highway 183 (Reynolds Rd) near the historic Andrew Hunter House gives access to downtown Bryant as well as I-30. Continuing east, Highway 5 intersects Highway 835 (Woody Drive) which leads to the Alexander branch of the Arkansas Department of Human Services's Youth Service Center, after which it enters Pulaski County.

The route meets Otter Creek Road and Highway 338 (Baseline Road), both collector roads for I-30/US 67/US 70 in southwest Little Rock. Entering a suburban area, Highway 5 terminates at an interchange with I-430 and US 70.

=== Main Street Bridge ===
The Main Street Bridge in Little Rock carries a hidden Highway 5 designation. The route is 0.38 miles (0.61 km) in span and multi-lane divided.

=== Cabot to Missouri ===
The route begins just south of I-57/US 67/US 167 at Highway 321 and Highway 367 in Cabot and runs north to cross Highway 89 and Highway 319. Highway 5 continues north to meet US 64 south of El Paso and Highway 310 near Romance. Highway 5 and Highway 310 form a concurrency that runs until Highway 36 in Rose Bud. The route continues north to Heber Springs, where it begins to concur with Highway 16/Highway 25.

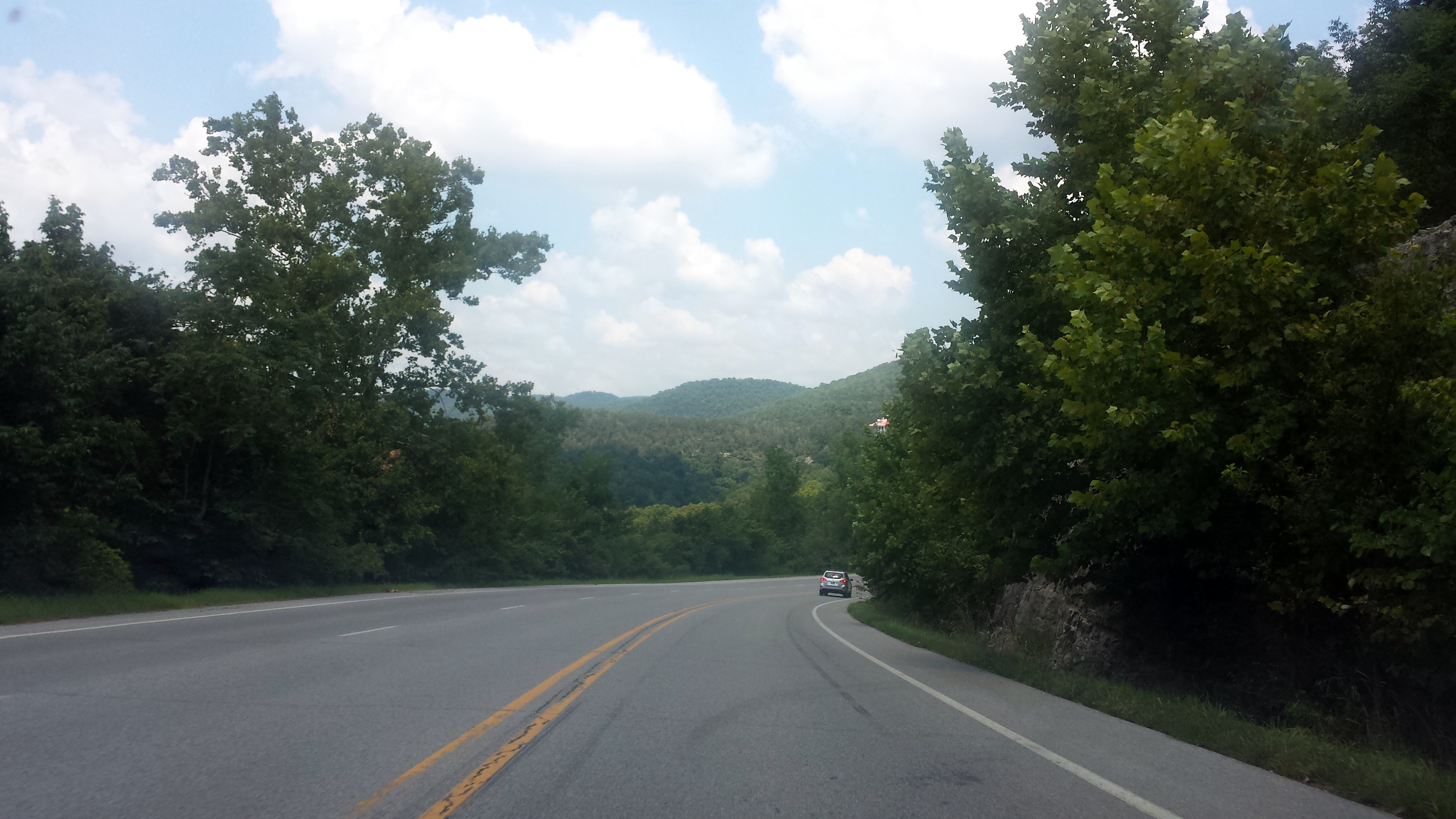
Highway 5, Highway 9 and Highway 14 near Mountain View

Highway 5 leaves Highway 25 near Wolf Bayou, when Highway 5 begins to run with Highway 87, named Mountain View Road. The two routes meet Highway 14 in front of the Stone County Medical Center in south Mountain View. Highway 5/Highway 14/Highway 87 run briefly west to Sylamore Avenue, when they meet Highway 9. Highway 5/Highway 9/Highway 14 run north through town to Allison, when Highway 5 continues northward alone. Passing through the Ozark National Forest, Highway 5 emerges near Calico Rock. The route takes a turn northwest, concurring with Highway 177 near Norfork. Highway 5 crosses US 62 southeast of Mountain Home. The route becomes 9th Street, meeting US 62B and Highway 201 in downtown Mountain Home. Highway 5 continues northwest to Midway, after which it heads north to the Missouri state line, where it continues as Missouri Route 5.

Missouri Route 5 runs entirely across Missouri and eventually becomes Iowa Highway 5.

== History ==

Highway 5 was created in 1926 as one of the original numbered state highways in Arkansas. At time of creation, Highway 5 did not extend south of Little Rock. The segment between Little Rock and Benton is the former alignment of US 67/US 70 in that area and was re-designated as Highway 5 upon completion of the freeway segment of US 67/US 70 (now I-30) in 1955.

The Arkansas State Highway Commission truncated Highway 5 at I-430 and renumbered the remainder of Stagecoach Road as US 70 on December 9, 2021 in a deal with the cities of Little Rock, North Little Rock, and Pulaski County to cover the relocation costs for Rock Region Metro as part of the "30 Crossing" project on I-30.

== Connection to Hot Springs Bypass extension ==
In 2023, a freeway was completed, connecting Highway 5 directly to the Hot Springs Bypass. Highway 5 now begins at an interchange with US 70 and US 70B east of Hot Springs and continues north to where it meets Highway 7 in Fountain Lake. The new section was originally scheduled to open in fall 2022; however, the national supply chain crisis delayed the project. Issues with a retaining wall also contributed to the delay, moving the completion date to September 18, 2023. The roadway is a two-lane freeway.

== Major intersections ==
County	Location	mi	km	Exit	Destinations	Notes
Garland		0.00	0.00	–	US 70 west to US 270 – Glenwood, Mount Ida	Southern terminus
Garland				11	US 70 east / US 70B west – Little Rock, Hot Springs	Southbound exit and northbound entrance; signed as exits 11A (east) and 11B (west); eastern terminus and exit 6B on US 70B
Garland				–	Mill Creek Road	
Garland		5.82	9.37	Northern end of freeway section		
Garland		5.82	9.37		AR 7 – Hot Springs, Hot Springs Village, Russellville	Roundabout
Garland	Fountain Lake	9.58	15.42		AR 128 east	Western terminus of AR 128
Saline	Crows	19.73	31.75		AR 9 north – Perryville	Southern terminus of AR 9
Saline		28.60	46.03		AR 298 west	Eastern terminus of AR 298
Saline	Benton	32.41	52.16		I-30 (US 67 / US 70) / AR 35 south – Benton, UALR Benton Center, Little Rock, Texarkana	Interchange; northern terminus of AR 35; exit 117 on I-30
Saline	Benton	34.03	54.77		I-30 (US 67 / US 70) / Congo Road – Little Rock, Texarkana	Interchange; exit 118 on I-30
Saline	Benton	36.77	59.18		To I-30 (US 67 / US 70)	Access via Alcoa Road
Saline	Bryant	38.97	62.72		AR 183 south (Reynolds Road)	Northern terminus of AR 183
Saline	Bryant	40.31	64.87		Woody Drive (AR 835 west) – Arkansas Juvenile Assessment and Treatment Center	Former AR 111
Pulaski	Little Rock	45.01	72.44		AR 338 east (Baseline Road)	Western terminus of AR 338
Pulaski	Little Rock	45.84	73.77		I-430 / US 70 east (Stagecoach Road)	Northern terminus; exit 1 on I-430
Pulaski	Little Rock	Gap in route				
Pulaski	Little Rock	0.00	0.00		Scott Street	Continuation south
Pulaski	Arkansas River			Main Street Bridge		
Pulaski	North Little Rock	0.38	0.61		Main Street	Continuation north
Gap in route
Lonoke	Cabot	0.00	0.00		AR 321 north / AR 367 north – Cabot	Southern terminus; southern termini of AR 321 and AR 367
Lonoke	Cabot	0.14	0.23		I-57 / US 67 / US 167 – Little Rock, Beebe, Cabot, St. Louis, Bald Knob, Jacksonville	Exit 16 on I-57
Lonoke–Pulaski county line	Cabot	2.73	4.39		AR 89 to I-57 / US 67 (US 167) / AR 107	
Lonoke		8.22	13.23		AR 319	
White		11.97	19.26		US 64 – Conway, Beebe	
White		20.83	33.52		AR 310 west – Mount Vernon	Eastern terminus of AR 310
White		21.57	34.71		AR 31 south – Romance, Beebe	Northern terminus of AR 31
White	Rose Bud	28.65	46.11		AR 36 west to AR 124 – Fairfield Bay, Mount Vernon	Southern end of AR 36 concurrency
White	Rose Bud	28.70	46.19		AR 36 east – Searcy	Northern end of AR 36 concurrency
Cleburne		38.58	62.09		AR 16 west / AR 25 south – Quitman, Greers Ferry	Southern end of AR 16/AR 25 concurrency
Cleburne	see AR 25 (mile 25.62–45.69)					
Cleburne	Wolf Bayou	58.61	94.32		AR 25 north (Heber Springs Road) – Batesville	Northern end of AR 25 concurrency
Stone	Mountain View	80.43	129.44		AR 14 east – Batesville	Southern end of AR 14 concurrency
Stone	Mountain View	82.11	132.14		AR 9 south to AR 66 – Mountain View Business District	Southern end of AR 9 concurrency
Stone	Mountain View	83.26	133.99		AR 382 west – Ozark Folk Center State Park	Eastern terminus of AR 382
Stone	Allison	87.85	141.38		AR 9 north / AR 14 west – Fifty Six, Melbourne, Blanchard Springs Caverns	Northern end of AR 9/AR 14 concurrency
Stone					AR 933-2 – Sylamore Creek Access	
Izard	Calico Rock	104.47	168.13		AR 56 east – Brockwell, Batesville, Business District	Western terminus of AR 56
Baxter	Norfork	115.16	185.33		AR 177 south (Shed Road)	Northern terminus of AR 177
Baxter	Norfork	117.98	189.87		AR 341 south to AR 201	Northern terminus of AR 341
Baxter	Salesville	120.07	193.23		AR 177 north – Jordan, Norfork Dam, Quarry Cove Recreation Areas	Southern terminus of AR 177
Baxter		124.17	199.83		AR 342 east (Sycamore Springs Road) – Georges Cove Recreation Area	Western terminus of AR 342
Baxter		124.61	200.54		AR 341 north (Tracy Ferry Road) – Tracy Recreation Area	Southern terminus of AR 341
Baxter		128.89	207.43		US 62 / US 412	Interchange
Baxter	Mountain Home	130.42	209.89		AR 201 south (College Street)	Southern end of AR 201 concurrency
Baxter	Mountain Home	130.78	210.47		US 62B west	Southern end of US 62B concurrency
Baxter	Mountain Home	130.90	210.66		AR 178 west (West 6th Street)	Eastern terminus of AR 178
Baxter	Mountain Home	131.22	211.18		US 62B east	Northern end of US 62B concurrency
Baxter	Mountain Home	131.29	211.29		AR 201 north	Northern end of AR 201 concurrency
Baxter	Midway	137.26	220.90		AR 126 south / AR 178 east – Whiteville, Gassville, Ozark Regional Airport	Southern end of AR 178 concurrency; northern terminus of AR 126
Baxter	Midway	137.36	221.06		AR 178 west – Lakeview, Bull Shoals, Bull Shoals-White River State Park	Northern end of AR 178 concurrency
Baxter		145.42	234.03		AR 202 west – Oakland, Oakland Park, Ozark Isle Park	Eastern terminus of AR 202
Baxter		146.63	235.98		Route 5 north – Gainesville	Continuation into Missouri
1.000 mi = 1.609 km; 1.000 km = 0.621 mi: Concurrency terminus
