= Beebe Theater =

Former movie theater in Beebe, Arkansas, United States

- U.S. National Register of Historic Places
- Location within Arkansas Location within the United States
- Location: Center St., Beebe, Arkansas
- Coordinates: 35°4′15″N 91°52′46″W
- Area: less than one acre
- Built: 1930
- Architectural style: Vernacular commercial
- MPS: White County MPS
- NRHP reference No.: 91001265
- Added to NRHP: September 5, 1991

The Beebe Theater was a historic performance space on Center Street in Beebe, Arkansas. It was a two-story brick structure, with a decorative brick-faced marquee extending in front, and decorative brickwork squares and parapet above the second level. A pair of entries flanked the ticket window in an entry that was recessed and raised a few steps above the sidewalk. Built about 1930, the building was a well-preserved example of vernacular commercial architecture found in smaller Arkansas cities.

The building was listed on the National Register of Historic Places in 1991. It has been listed as destroyed in the Arkansas Historic Preservation Program database.

== See also ==
- National Register of Historic Places listings in White County, Arkansas
