= Powell Clothing Store =

- U.S. National Register of Historic Places
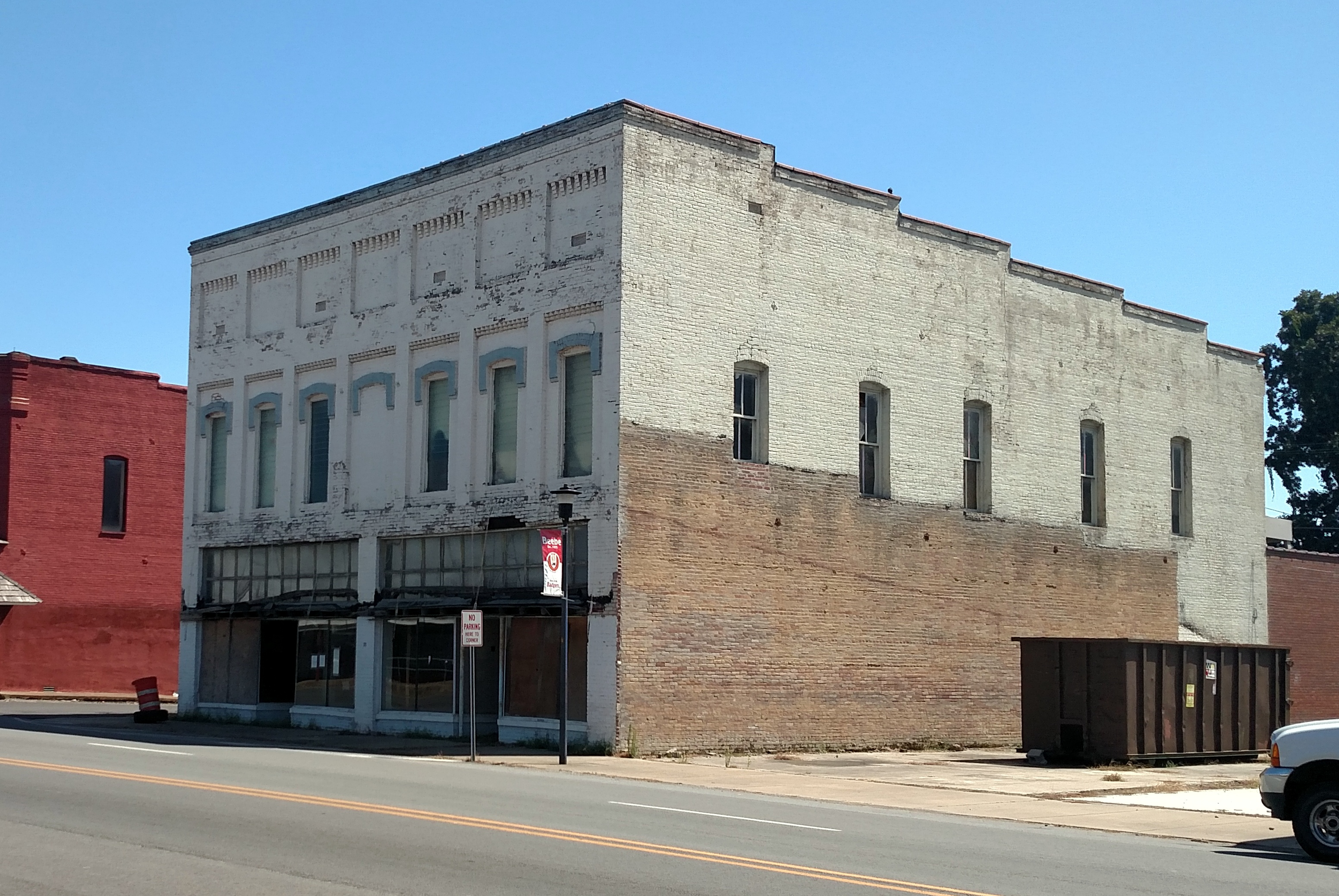

- Location within Arkansas Location within the United States
- Location: 201 N. Main St., Beebe, Arkansas
- Coordinates: 35°4′16″N 91°52′51″W
- Area: less than one acre
- Built: 1885
- Architectural style: Brick rectangular
- MPS: White County MPS
- NRHP reference No.: 91001249
- Added to NRHP: September 5, 1991

Powell Clothing Store is a historic commercial building at 201 North Main Street in Beebe, Arkansas. It is a two-story brick building, built about 1885 in what was then the city's economic heart. It is a basically vernacular structure, with modest brick corbelling on the cornice and panels of the front facade. It is one of only a few commercial buildings to survive in the city from that period.

The building was listed on the National Register of Historic Places in 1991.

== See also ==
- National Register of Historic Places listings in White County, Arkansas
