= Smith-Moore House =

Historic house in Arkansas, United States

- Formerly listed on the U.S. National Register of Historic Places
- Location within Arkansas Location within the United States
- Location: 901 N. Main St., Beebe, Arkansas
- Coordinates: 35°4′41″N 91°52′55″W
- Area: less than one acre
- Built: 1880
- Built by: J.S. Smith
- Architectural style: Vernacular hall and parlor
- MPS: White County MPS
- NRHP reference No.: 91001246

Significant dates
- Added to NRHP: July 20, 1992
- Removed from NRHP: January 26, 2018

The Smith-Moore House is a historic house at 901 North Main Street in Beebe, Arkansas. It is a 1 1/2-story wood-frame structure, with a side gable roof, weatherboard exterior, and a foundation of brick piers. Its front facade has three gabled wall dormers above its entry porch, and there is a carport extending to the right. The house was built about 1880, and is one of the few houses in White County surviving from that period.

The house was listed on the National Register of Historic Places in 1992. It was delisted in 2018.

== See also ==
- National Register of Historic Places listings in White County, Arkansas
