= Laws-Jarvis House =

Historic house in Arkansas, United States

- U.S. National Register of Historic Places
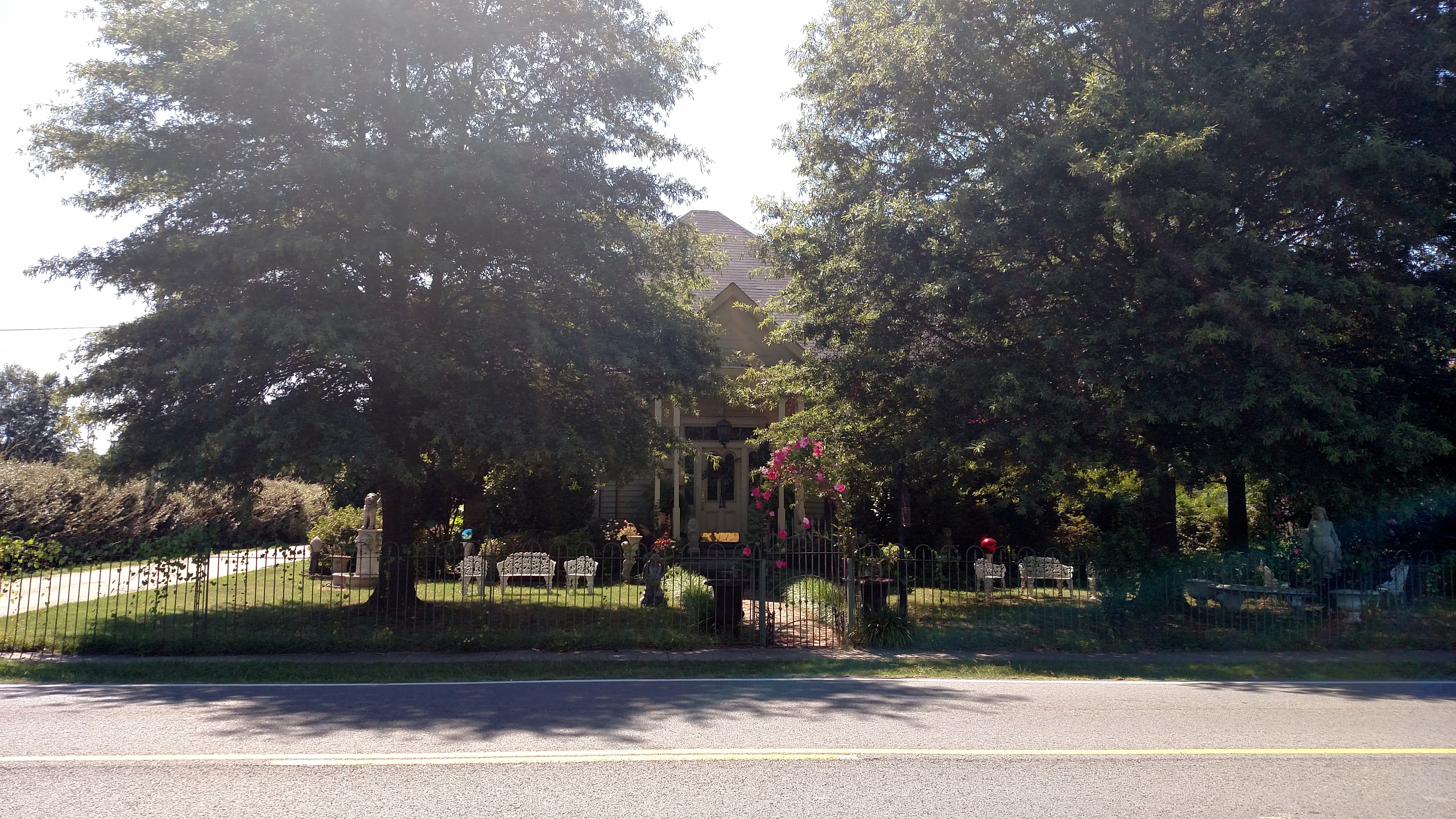

- Location within Arkansas Location within the United States
- Location: 409 N. Main St., Beebe, Arkansas
- Coordinates: 35°4′22″N 91°52′55″W
- Area: less than one acre
- Built: 1880
- Architectural style: Ell-shaped
- MPS: White County MPS
- NRHP reference No.: 91001256
- Added to NRHP: July 22, 1992

The Laws-Jarvis House is a historic house at 409 North Main Street in Beebe, Arkansas. It is a single-story wood-frame structure, with a weatherboard exterior and brick foundation. Its original form, as built about 1880, featured an L-shaped layout, with central entrance gabled porch supported by slender columns with plain capitals, and windows with pedimented lintels. It has since been altered by an addition to the rear, giving its roof an overall hip shape. The house is one of White County's surviving 19th-century houses.

The house was listed on the National Register of Historic Places in 1992.

== See also ==
- National Register of Historic Places listings in White County, Arkansas
