= Arkansas Highway 267 =

State highway in Arkansas, United States

Highway 267

Route information
- Maintained by ArDOT

Section 1
- Length: 15.320 mi (24.655 km)
- South end: AR 31 near Antioch
- North end: AR 367 in Searcy

Section 2
- Length: 2.249 mi (3.619 km)
- South end: AR 13 near Beebe
- North end: AR 31 near Beebe

Location
- Country: United States
- State: Arkansas
- Counties: White

Highway system
- Arkansas Highway System; Interstate; US; State; Business; Spurs; Suffixed; Scenic; Heritage
| ← AR 266 | → AR 268 |

Highway 267 (AR 267, Ark. 267, and Hwy. 267) is a designation for two state highways in White County. One route of 15.47 miles (24.90 km) begins at Highway 31 and runs northeast to Highway 367 in Searcy. A second route of 2.25 miles (3.62 km) begins at Highway 31 and runs east to Highway 13. Highway 267 Spur, a spur route of 0.90 miles (1.45 km) connects Highway 267 and Highway 31 north of Beebe. The highways are maintained by the Arkansas Department of Transportation (ARDOT).

== Route description ==
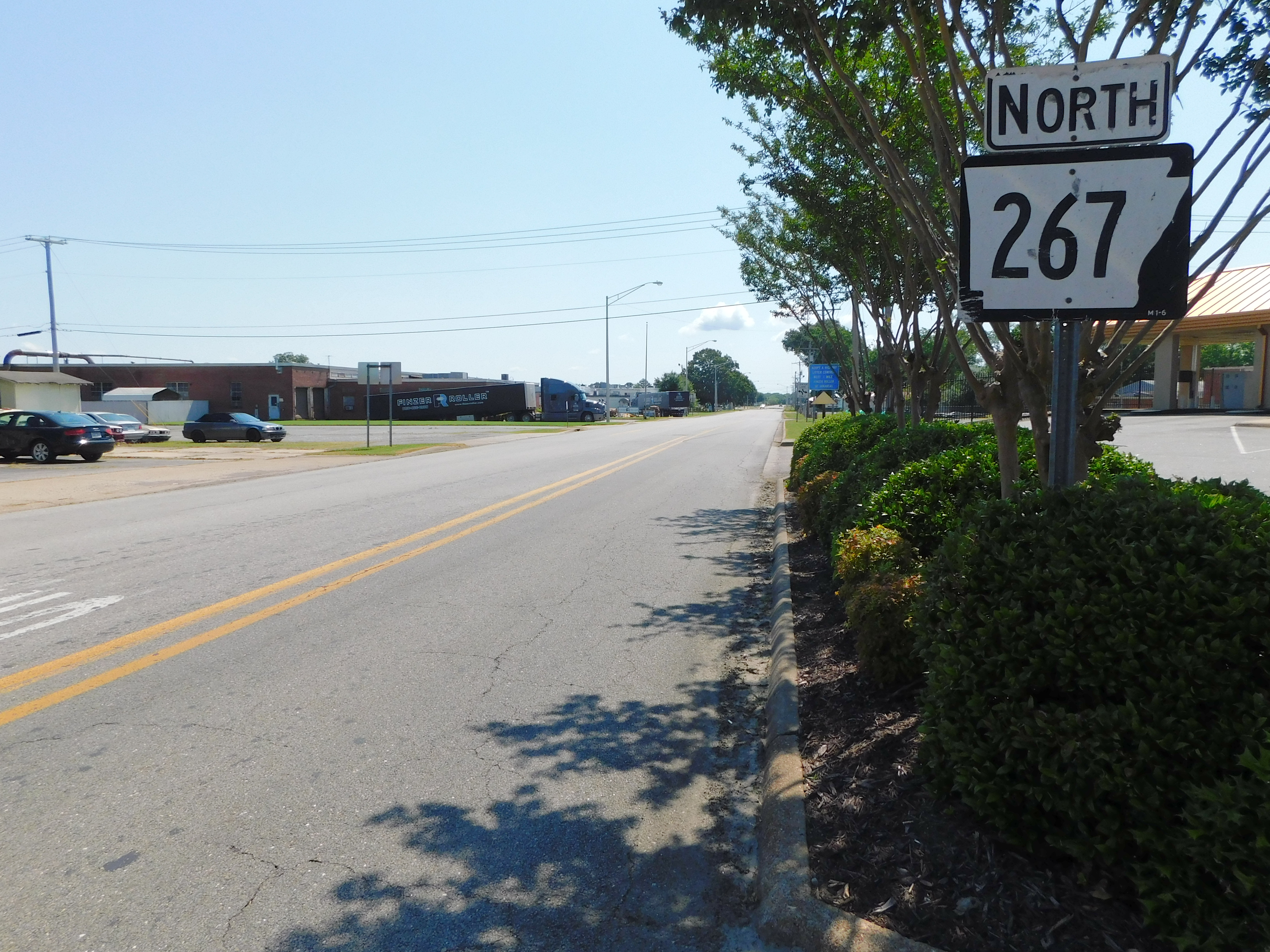
Highway 267 at the intersection of US 67B in Searcy, Arkansas

The ArDOT maintains Highway 267 like all other parts of the state highway system. As a part of these responsibilities, the Department tracks the volume of traffic using its roads in surveys using a metric called average annual daily traffic (AADT). ArDOT estimates the traffic level for a segment of roadway for any average day of the year in these surveys. As of 2019, estimates along the longer segment ranged from 380 vehicles per day (VPD) near the southern terminus, to 3600 VPD along Lincoln Avenue in Searcy. The highest traffic count was 12,000 VPD along the one-block overlap with US Highway 67B (US 67B, Main Street) in Searcy. The short segment had a 2019 AADT of 920 VPD. Highways under 400 VPD are classified as very low volume local road by the American Association of State Highway and Transportation Officials (AASHTO).

=== Highway 31 to Highway 13 ===
Highway 267 (Cypress Lake Road) begins at Highway 31 in southern White County south of Beebe near Cypress Bayou Wildlife Management Area. The highway runs due east as a section line road to Highway 13, where it terminates.

== Major intersections ==
The entire route is in White County.

| Location | mi | km | Destinations | Notes |
|---|---|---|---|---|
| | 0.000 | 0.000 | AR 31 – Beebe | Southern terminus |
| | 1.50 | 2.41 | AR 267S south | AR 267S northern terminus |
| | 2.29 | 3.69 | AR 321 south | AR 321 northern terminus |
| | 7.39 | 11.89 | AR 13 south – McRae, Searcy | |
| Searcy | 13.53– 13.57 | 21.77– 21.84 | US 67B (Main Street) | officially designated exception |
| Searcy | 15.320 | 24.655 | AR 367 (Booth Road / Queensway Street) | Northern terminus; former US 67 |
Gap in route
| | 2.249 | 3.619 | AR 13 – Hickory Plains | Southern terminus; former AR 371 |
| | 0.00 | 0.00 | AR 31 – Beebe, Lonoke | Northern terminus |
1.000 mi = 1.609 km; 1.000 km = 0.621 mi: Concurrency terminus

== Spur route ==
Highway 267S
- Location: White County
- Length: 0.905 mi (1,456 m)
- Existed: 1970–present

Highway 267S (AR 267S, Ark. 267S, and Hwy. 267S) is a spur route in White County, Arkansas. Created in 1970, the highway alignment has remained unchanged since creation.

Route description
The highway runs south from the parent route to Highway 31.

Major intersections
The entire route is in White County.

| Location | mi | km | Destinations | Notes |
|---|---|---|---|---|
| | 0.00 | 0.00 | AR 267 | Northern terminus |
| | 0.905 | 1.456 | AR 31 | Southern terminus |
1.000 mi = 1.609 km; 1.000 km = 0.621 mi
