= Blakemore, Arkansas =

- Unincorporated community
- Location within Arkansas Location within the United States
- Coordinates: 34°36′17″N 91°52′55″W
- Country: United States
- State: Arkansas
- County: Lonoke
- Elevation: 220 ft (67 m)
- Time zone: UTC-6 (Central (CST))
  - Summer (DST): UTC-5 (CDT)
- GNIS feature ID: 61178

Blakemore (also Lute Store) is an unincorporated community in Lonoke County, Arkansas, United States.
