= Sylvania, Arkansas =

Unincorporated community in Arkansas, US

Coordinates: 34°58′20″N 91°55′43″W

Sylvania, Arkansas is an unincorporated community located in Lonoke County, Arkansas, United States.
