= Arkansas Highway 13 =

Highway in Arkansas

Highway 13

Route information
- Maintained by ArDOT
- Existed: 1926–present

Section 1
- Length: 54.79 mi (88.18 km)
- South end: US 63 / US 79 in Humphrey
- Major intersections: US 165 in Humnoke: US 70 in Carlisle; I-40 in Carlisle
- North end: Campground Road near Beebe

Section 2
- Length: 17.76 mi (28.58 km)
- South end: AR 367 in McRae
- Major intersections: I-57 / US 64 / US 67 / US 167 near McRae
- North end: AR 385 near Judsonia

Section 3
- Length: 5.91 mi (9.51 km)
- South end: AR 367 in Judsonia
- North end: AR 258 near Providence

Location
- Country: United States
- State: Arkansas
- Counties: Arkansas, Jefferson, Lonoke, Prairie, White

Highway system
- Arkansas Highway System; Interstate; US; State; Business; Spurs; Suffixed; Scenic; Heritage
← AR 12	→ AR 14
← US 371	AR 371	→ AR 372

Arkansas Highway 13 (AR 13) is a designation for three state highways in Central Arkansas. One segment of 54.79 miles (88.18 km) runs from U.S. Highway 63/U.S. Highway 79 (US 63/US 79) in Humphrey north to Campground Road east of Beebe. A second segment of 17.76 miles (28.58 km) runs from AR 367 in McRae north to AR 385 west of Judsonia. A third segment of 5.91 miles (9.51 km) runs from AR 367 in Judsonia north to AR 258 east of Providence.

The southern part of AR 13 was replaced by AR 81 during World War II. Then, in 1989, when US 425 was commissioned, it replaced most of AR 81.

== Route description ==
=== Humphrey to Beebe ===
AR 13 begins at US 63/US 79 in Humphrey and heads north to US 165 in Humnoke. The route continues north to an intersection with US 70 and an interchange with Interstate 40 (I-40) in Carlisle before meeting Campground Road east of Beebe, where it terminates.

=== McRae to Judsonia ===
The route begins in McRae at AR 367 and runs north to an interchange with I-57/US 64/US 67/US 167. The route crosses AR 267 before continuing north to AR 36 (Beebe Capps Expressway) at the western city limit of Searcy before meeting AR 385 west of Judsonia, where it terminates.

=== Judsonia to Providence ===
The route begins at AR 367 near Friendly Acres Park and runs west as Missile Base Road, crossing I-57/US 64/US 67/US 167 north of Judsonia (but lacks direct access this time). After this bridging, AR 13 turns north to intersect AR 157 before terminating at AR 258 near the Emmett Miller House east of Providence.

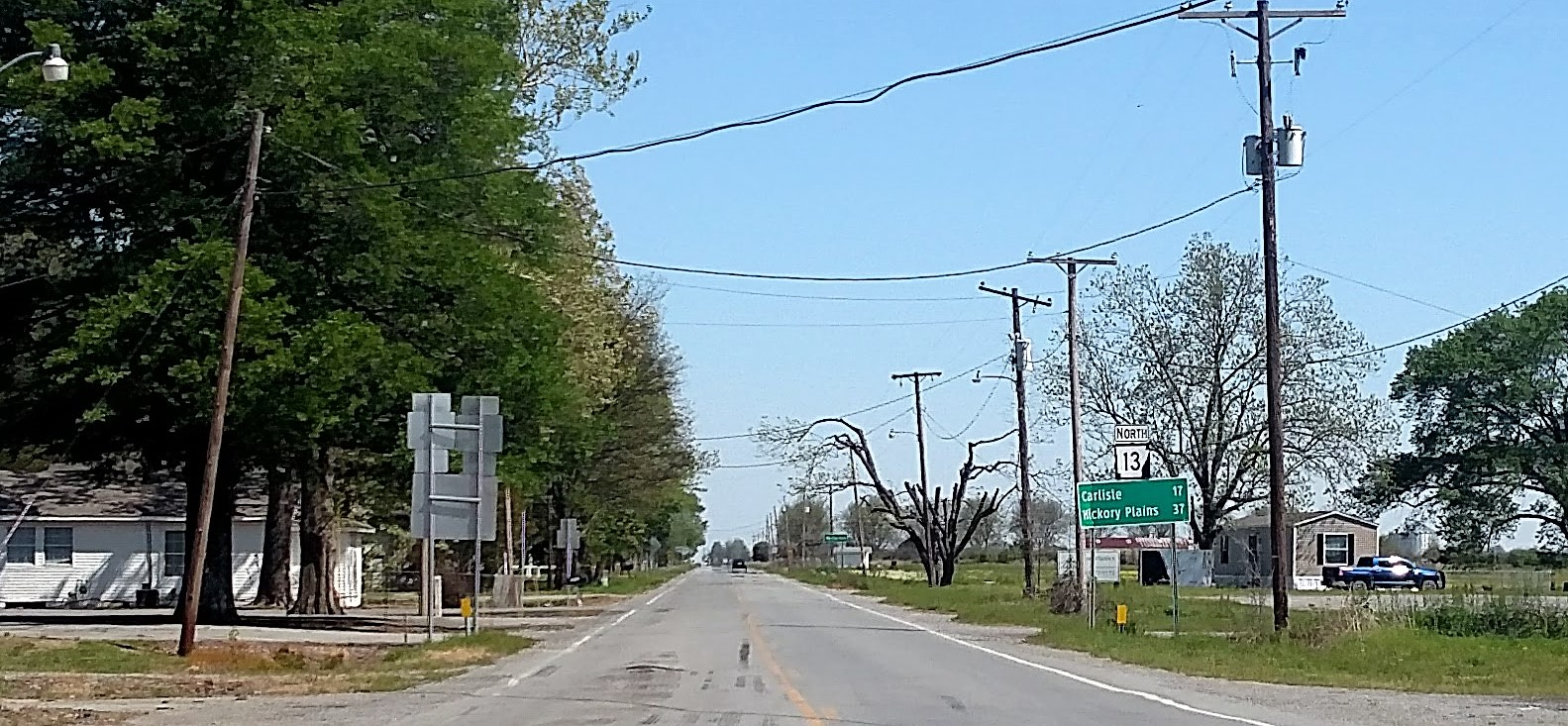
AR 13 north of the US 165 junction in Humnoke

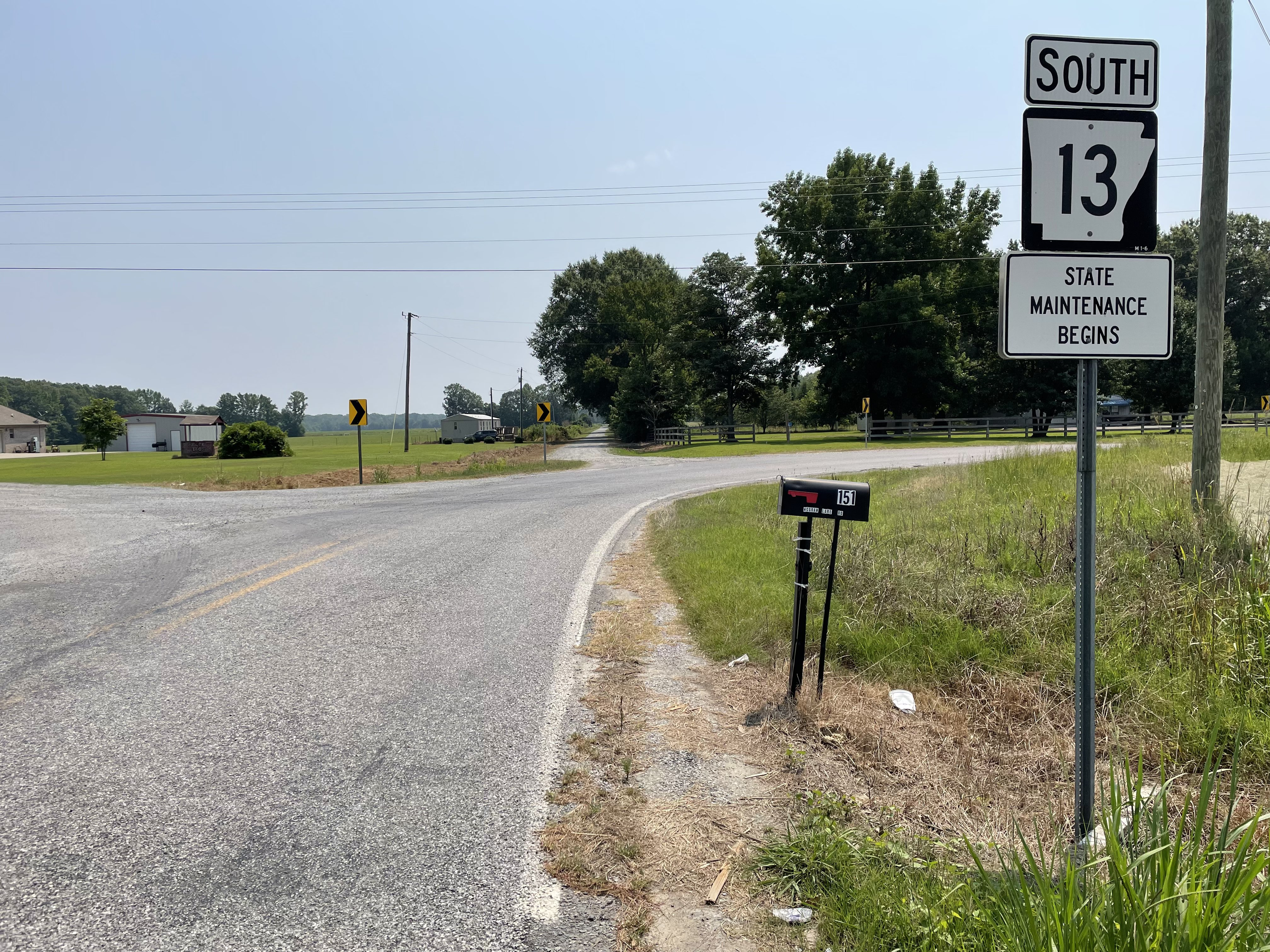
Northern terminus of AR 13 at Campground Road in Beebe

== History ==
AR 13 was one of the original 1926 state highways. The route ran about 90 miles (140 km) from the Louisiana state line to US 65 south of Pine Bluff. The section from US 70 to AR 38 was designated in 1941. In 1945, the original portion of the route was renumbered AR 81, which this section was replaced by US 425 when it was commissioned in 1989. The route extended north to Beebe and south to Humphrey later. In 1994, the road replaced the two sections of Arkansas Highway 371 (AR 371) from McRae to AR 267 and from Judsonia to AR 258 to avoid conflict with the newly designated US 371.

== Major intersections ==
County	Location	mi	km	Destinations	Notes
Arkansas	Humphrey	0.00	0.00	US 63 / US 79 – Stuttgart, Pine Bluff	Southern terminus
Jefferson	No major junctions				
Lonoke	Humnoke	12.01	19.33	US 165 – England, Stuttgart	
Lonoke		16.14	25.97	AR 232 west – Seaton	Eastern terminus of AR 232
Lonoke	Carlisle	28.47	45.82	US 70 (West Park Street) – Lonoke, Hazen	
Lonoke	Carlisle	29.88	48.09	I-40 – Little Rock, Memphis	Exit 183 on I-40
Lonoke	Carlisle	30.04	48.34	AR 980 (Airport Road) – Carlisle Municipal Airport	
Lonoke		37.96	61.09	AR 236 west	Eastern terminus of AR 236
Prairie	Hickory Plains	44.89	72.24	AR 38 – Cabot, Des Arc	
White		52.77	84.93	AR 267 north (Cypress Lake Road)	Southern terminus of AR 267
White		54.79	88.18	Campground Road	Northern terminus
White	Gap in route				
White	McRae	0.00	0.00	AR 367	Southern terminus; former US 67
White		1.01	1.63	I-57 / US 64 / US 67 / US 167 – Beebe, Little Rock, Searcy, St. Louis	Exit 35 on I-57
White		5.03	8.10	AR 267 north	Southern terminus of AR 267
White	Searcy	9.90	15.93	AR 36	
White		13.64	21.95	AR 16	
White		17.76	28.58	AR 385	Northern terminus
White	Gap in route				
White	Judsonia	0.00	0.00	AR 367	Southern terminus; former US 67
White		2.94	4.73	AR 157 – Plainview, Judsonia	
White		5.91	9.51	AR 258	Northern terminus
1.000 mi = 1.609 km; 1.000 km = 0.621 mi
