= El Paso, Arkansas =

Unincorporated community in Arkansas, US

- Census-designated place
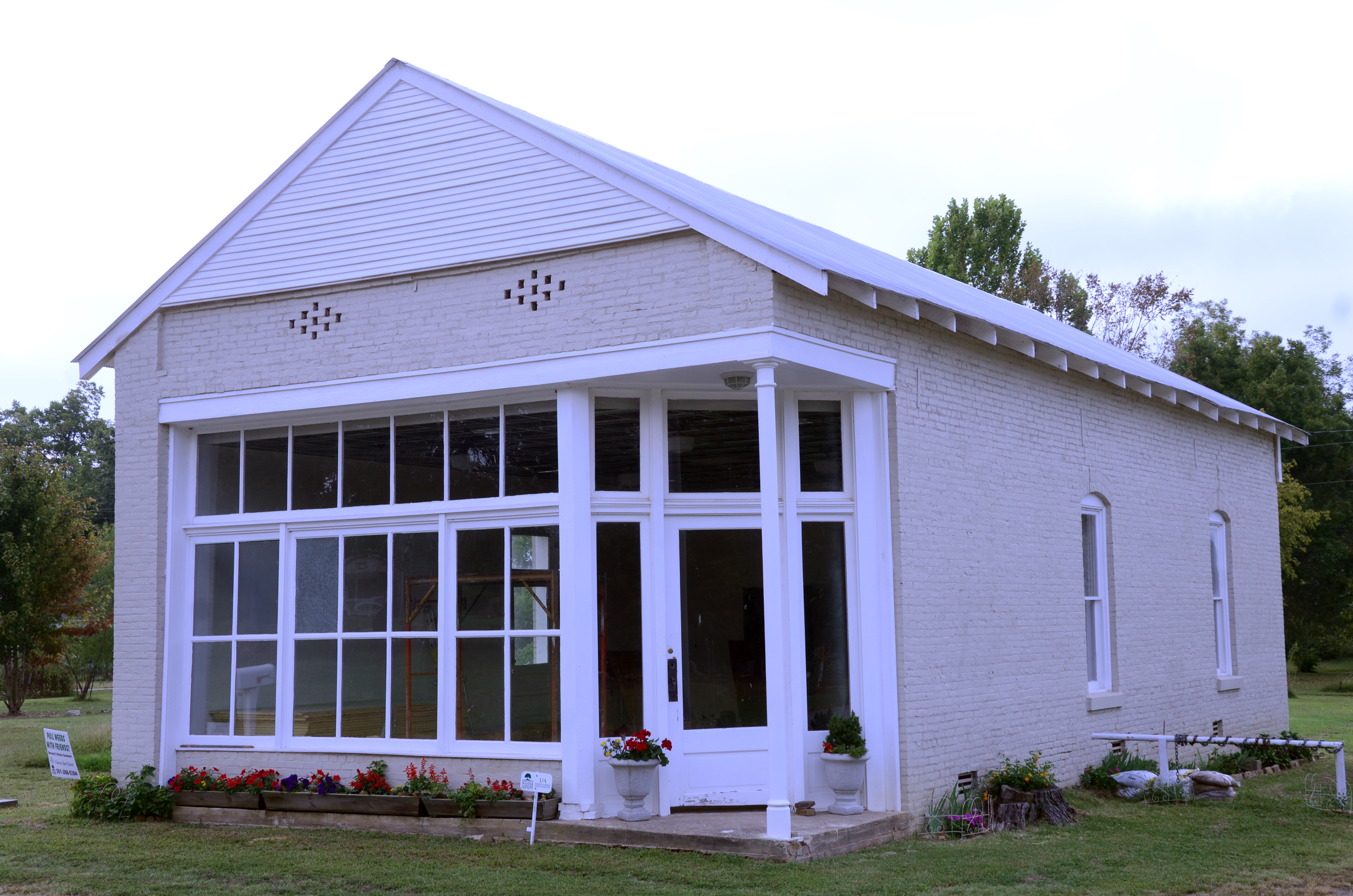
- El Paso Bank

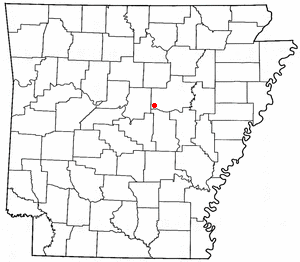

- Location within Arkansas Location within the United States
- Coordinates: 35°07′34″N 92°04′54″W
- Country: United States
- State: Arkansas
- County: White
- Elevation: 276 ft (84 m)

Population (2020)
  - Total: 267
- Time zone: UTC-6 (Central (CST))
  - Summer (DST): UTC-5 (CDT)
- GNIS feature ID: 2805640

El Paso is an unincorporated community and census-designated place (CDP) in southwestern White County, Arkansas, United States. It was first listed as a CDP in the 2020 census with a population of 267. Its name is Spanish for "the pass", referring to a small gap in the hills on the community's northern edge. Once known as Peach Orchard Gap in its early settlement, the origin of El Paso's Spanish name is unknown.

== History ==
The historic Southwest Trail, a path used by most travelers entering Arkansas early in the 1800s, entered El Paso on today's Arkansas Highway 5 from Floyd, then headed to Gibson via Arkansas Highway 89, Tate's Mill Road and Batesville Pike Road. By the 1830s more than 80 percent of the Arkansas territory's population had entered through the Southwest Trail. The route is also known as the Old Military Road.

== Geography ==
Much of the community is situated along Bull Creek, and along Arkansas State Highway 5 and U.S. Highway 64. Lacking exact boundaries, the community is located within the borders of El Paso Township, within White County.

The closest city is Vilonia, approximately seven miles to the west of El Paso via U.S. 64. Beebe, where El Paso's children attend public schools, is about 13 miles to the east along this highway. Along Arkansas 5, Cabot is 15 miles to the south, and the unincorporated community of Romance is eight miles north.

== Demographics ==
Historical population
Census	Pop.	Note	%±
2020	267		—
U.S. Decennial Census; 2020

=== 2020 census ===
El Paso CDP, Arkansas – Racial and ethnic composition Note: the US Census treats Hispanic/Latino as an ethnic category. This table excludes Latinos from the racial categories and assigns them to a separate category. Hispanics/Latinos may be of any race.
Race / Ethnicity (NH = Non-Hispanic)	Pop 2020	% 2020
White alone (NH)	232	86.89%
Black or African American alone (NH)	2	0.75%
Native American or Alaska Native alone (NH)	4	1.50%
Asian alone (NH)	2	0.75%
Pacific Islander alone (NH)	0	0.00%
Some Other Race alone (NH)	2	0.75%
Mixed Race or Multi-Racial (NH)	13	4.87%
Hispanic or Latino (any race)	12	4.49%
Total	267	100.00%

== Education ==
El Paso is in the Beebe School District.
