= Floyd, Arkansas =

Floyd
- Census-designated place
- Location within Arkansas
- Coordinates: 35°11′56″N 91°57′52″W
- Country: United States
- State: Arkansas
- County: White County
- Founded: 1842
- Incorporated: N/A
- Elevation: 413 ft (126 m)

Population (2020)
  - Total: 377
- Time zone: UTC-6 (CST)
  - Summer (DST): UTC-5 (CDT)
- GNIS feature ID: 2805644

Floyd is an unincorporated community and census-designated place (CDP) in western White County, Arkansas, United States. It was first listed as a CDP in the 2020 census with a population of 377. The rural community is situated along Highways 31 and 305, in addition to the county-maintained El Paso Road. Though relatively small, the community maintains a variety of activities and institutions throughout the year, notably its annual parade and display of fireworks during Independence Day.

== Geography and history ==
Lacking exact boundaries, Floyd is located within Coffey Township, in western White County. The largest part of the community today is located approximately 11 miles northwest of Beebe, Arkansas. Among the earliest settlers in the area was James Barnett and his family in 1842; nearby Lake Barnett shares the name of these pioneers. Another indicator of the community's longevity is the first local cemetery, which was used as early as December 1865, when Jesse Levi Akin was the first person buried in what is now the Old Floyd Cemetery.

The historic Southwest Trail, a path used by most travelers entering Arkansas early in the 1800s, entered Floyd on today's Highway 305 from Center Hill, then headed to El Paso via El Paso Road. By the 1830s more than 80 percent of the Arkansas territory's population had entered through the Southwest Trail. The route is also known as the Old Military Road.

== Demographics ==
Historical population
| Census | Pop. | Note | %± |
|---|---|---|---|
| 2020 | 377 | | — |
U.S. Decennial Census; 2020

=== 2020 census ===
Floyd CDP, Arkansas – Racial and ethnic composition Note: the US Census treats Hispanic/Latino as an ethnic category. This table excludes Latinos from the racial categories and assigns them to a separate category. Hispanics/Latinos may be of any race.
| Race / Ethnicity (NH = Non-Hispanic) | Pop 2020 | % 2020 |
|---|---|---|
| White alone (NH) | 328 | 87.00% |
| Black or African American alone (NH) | 11 | 2.92% |
| Native American or Alaska Native alone (NH) | 9 | 2.39% |
| Asian alone (NH) | 1 | 0.27% |
| Pacific Islander alone (NH) | 0 | 0.00% |
| Some Other Race alone (NH) | 0 | 0.00% |
| Mixed Race or Multi-Racial (NH) | 25 | 6.63% |
| Hispanic or Latino (any race) | 3 | 0.80% |
| Total | 377 | 100.00% |

== Education ==
While Floyd maintained a separate school district in its earlier years, the community today is served by the Beebe School District. The former school cafeteria still stands along the east side of Highway 31, and has served as a community center for many years since consolidation of the school district.

In addition, the community hosts a chapter of the Extension Homemakers Clubs, an outreach of the University of Arkansas Division of Agriculture's Cooperative Extension Service. Through the local EH Club, topics of improving community and family dynamics are often addressed through workshops, regular monthly member meetings, and participation in exhibitions such as the annual White County Fair and Livestock Show. Similarly, the community also offers a 4-H chapter for area youth educational enhancement.
