= Woodlawn, Lonoke County, Arkansas =

Woodlawn, Arkansas
- Unincorporated community
- Location within Arkansas Location within the United States
- Coordinates: 34°55′20″N 91°52′27″W
- Country: United States
- State: Arkansas
- County: Lonoke
- Elevation: 249 ft (76 m)
- Time zone: UTC-6 (Central (CST))
  - Summer (DST): UTC-5 (CDT)
- Area code: 501
- GNIS feature ID: 59098

Woodlawn is an unincorporated community in Lonoke County, Arkansas, United States. Woodlawn is located on Arkansas Highway 31, 9.5 miles (15.3 km) north of Lonoke.
