= Beebe, Arkansas =

- City
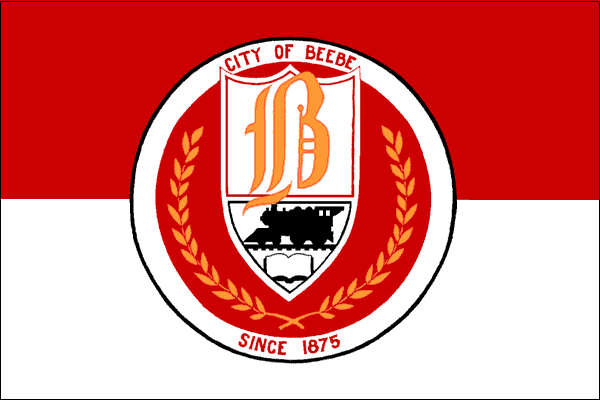
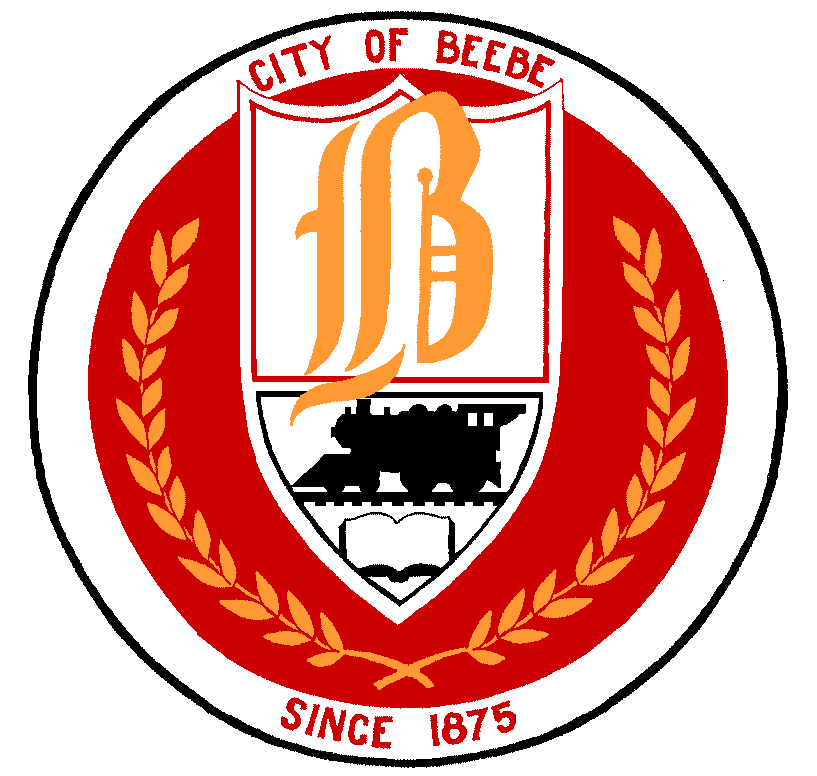
- Flag Seal

- Location of Beebe in White County, Arkansas.

- Location in Arkansas Beebe (the United States) Beebe (North America)
- Coordinates: 35°04′23″N 91°53′05″W
- Country: United States
- State: Arkansas
- County: White

Area
  - Total: 10.25 sq mi (26.56 km^{2})
  - Land: 10.14 sq mi (26.27 km^{2})
  - Water: 0.11 sq mi (0.29 km^{2})
- Elevation: 249 ft (76 m)

Population (2020)
  - Total: 8,437
  - Estimate (2025): 9,377 ▲
  - Density: 831.7/sq mi (321.13/km^{2})
- Time zone: UTC-6 (Central (CST))
  - Summer (DST): UTC-5 (CDT)
- ZIP code: 72012
- Area code: 501
- FIPS code: 05-04600
- GNIS feature ID: 2403835
- Website: www.beebeark.org

Beebe is a city in White County, Arkansas, United States. The population was 9,092 at the 2024 Census Bureau estimate, making it the second most populous in the county. The city is home to Arkansas State University-Beebe. ASU-Beebe also has branch campuses in Heber Springs and Searcy and at Little Rock Air Force Base.

== History ==
The community was named after Roswell Beebe, a railroad executive responsible for bringing the rail line that runs through the city. Beebe was incorporated in 1875.

== Geography ==
According to the United States Census Bureau, the city has a total area of 4.3 square miles (11 km^{2}), all land.

== Demographics ==
Historical population
Census	Pop.	Note	%±
1880	428		—
1900	904		—
1910	873		−3.4%
1920	995		14.0%
1930	1,108		11.4%
1940	1,189		7.3%
1950	1,192		0.3%
1960	1,697		42.4%
1970	2,805		65.3%
1980	3,599		28.3%
1990	4,455		23.8%
2000	4,930		10.7%
2010	7,315		48.4%
2020	8,437		15.3%
2025 (est.)	9,377	▲	11.1%
U.S. Decennial Census; 2014 Estimate

=== 2020 census ===
As of the 2020 census, Beebe had a population of 8,437 people, 3,185 households, and 2,047 families. The median age was 31.9 years. 26.6% of residents were under the age of 18 and 14.7% of residents were 65 years of age or older. For every 100 females there were 89.2 males, and for every 100 females age 18 and over there were 84.9 males age 18 and over.

85.5% of residents lived in urban areas, while 14.5% lived in rural areas.

Of the city's households, 36.9% had children under the age of 18 living in them. Of all households, 41.6% were married-couple households, 17.7% were households with a male householder and no spouse or partner present, and 33.6% were households with a female householder and no spouse or partner present. About 28.7% of all households were made up of individuals and 12.0% had someone living alone who was 65 years of age or older.

There were 3,457 housing units, of which 7.9% were vacant. The homeowner vacancy rate was 2.6% and the rental vacancy rate was 6.6%.

Beebe racial composition
Race	Number	Percentage
White (non-Hispanic)	6,858	81.28%
Black or African American (non-Hispanic)	527	6.25%
Native American	41	0.49%
Asian	73	0.87%
Pacific Islander	2	0.02%
Other/Mixed	565	6.7%
Hispanic or Latino	371	4.4%

=== 2010 census ===
As of the census of 2010, there were 7,315 people, 1,930 households, and 1,397 families residing in the city. The population density was 1,142.1 inhabitants per square mile (441.0/km^{2}). There were 2,115 housing units at an average density of 490.0 per square mile (189.2/km^{2}). The racial makeup of the city was 90.87% White, 5.86% Black or African American, 0.47% Native American, 0.63% Asian, 0.04% Pacific Islander, 0.55% from other races, and 1.58% from two or more races. 1.34% of the population were Hispanic or Latino of any race.

There were 1,930 households, out of which 33.8% had children under the age of 18 living with them, 55.6% were married couples living together, 13.0% had a female householder with no husband present, and 27.6% were non-families. 25.3% of all households were made up of individuals, and 11.1% had someone living alone who was 65 years of age or older. The average household size was 2.51 and the average family size was 2.99.

In the city, the population was spread out, with 25.9% under the age of 18, 10.7% from 18 to 24, 28.2% from 25 to 44, 21.8% from 45 to 64, and 13.4% who were 65 years of age or older. The median age was 35 years. For every 100 females, there were 90.5 males. For every 100 females age 18 and over, there were 87.8 males.

The median income for a household in the city was $35,252, and the median income for a family was $41,307. Males had a median income of $31,143 versus $20,881 for females. The per capita income for the city was $16,989. About 6.6% of families and 11.2% of the population were below the poverty line, including 13.0% of those under age 18 and 17.0% of those age 65 or over.

== Education ==
The city's education corridor is among the most prominent aspects in Beebe, with the city's public schools grouped in an extensive campus situated across the street from Arkansas State University Beebe. Significant additions have been made to the campus since January 1999, when a powerful tornado destroyed nearly complete new school buildings and historic residential areas surrounding the downtown area. The public school district grew in 2004 when schools from nearby McRae were consolidated into the district, which today serves most of southwestern and south-central White County — proceeding westward to El Paso, eastward to Garner, and to other communities in between. Beebe's district also includes the headquarters of a four-county educational service cooperative named for noted former U.S. Representative Wilbur Mills, and located on the city's Main Street.

Public education is supported by the Beebe School District consisting of:

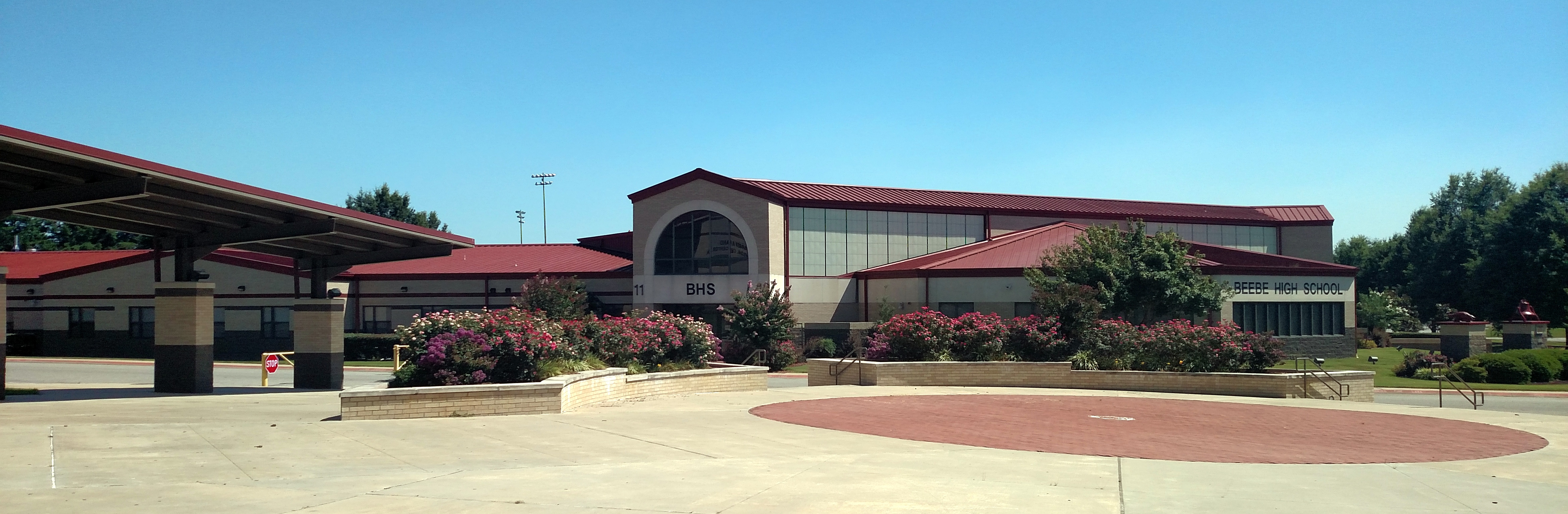
Beebe High School

- Beebe High School (9-12)
- Beebe Junior High School (7-8)
- Beebe Middle School (5-6)
- Beebe Elementary School (1-4)
- Badger Elementary (2-4)
- Beebe Early Childhood School (KG-1)
- Badger Academy (7-12 alternative school)

Privately run day care and preschool services are also available in Beebe. In addition, Lighthouse Pentecostal Church in eastern Beebe provides religious-based K-12 and post-secondary education.

Founded as the Junior Agricultural School of Central Arkansas in 1927, Arkansas State University Beebe's campus has evolved and grown to become a center for long-distance learning and technical trade programs in central Arkansas. The school has been affiliated with the Arkansas State University System since 1955. State Hall, the campus' administration building constructed in 1949, is among both the oldest buildings on the campus and in Beebe's educational community. In the fall of 2005, ASU-Beebe had the second highest enrollment among Arkansas's two-year colleges and universities, trailing only Pulaski Technical College in North Little Rock. ASU-Beebe today is the parent campus to branch campuses in Searcy (at the former Foothills Vocational-Technical Institute) and Heber Springs, and an educational center inside Little Rock Air Force Base in Jacksonville.

== Transportation ==
Beebe is served by three main U.S. highways, US 64, US 67, and US 167. US 64 connects Beebe with the growing city of Conway, located 35 miles (56 km) west of Beebe. From Conway, US 64 meets I-40, which provides access to Fort Smith. U.S. 67/167 is a four-lane freeway that officially became I-57 on November 7, 2024 and connects Beebe with Little Rock to the southwest and with Searcy, Newport, and Walnut Ridge to the northeast. At Exit 28, US 64 joins US 67/167 as it goes northeast to Bald Knob where it branches off of US 67 and goes east to Wynne and eventually West Memphis in eastern Arkansas, while US 167 also splits from US 67 at Bald Knob to provide connection to Batesville.

Additionally, U.S. Route 67B starts from just east of US 67/US 167 at Exit 28 and goes east into downtown Beebe via W. Center Street, passing between the Beebe Public Schools main campus and ASU-Beebe. The path proceeds north from downtown near the historic Beebe Railroad Station back to US 64/US 67/US 167, as it is a concurrent highway with Arkansas Highway 31 (N. Main Street).

Beebe is also served by Arkansas Highway 367 (DeWitt Henry Drive), which is a former alignment of US 67 prior to the building of the US 67/US 167 freeway. A spur of Arkansas 367 is concurrent with a portion of the city's N. Pecan Street, to join the freeway at Exit 29 and serve as ASU-Beebe's primary freeway link. Just outside the city limits of Beebe, the rural areas are served by Highway 321 and Highway 267 to the northeast, and Highway 13 to the east.

Just like many towns in central and north central Arkansas, Beebe was formed near a railroad and the Union Pacific railroad tracks traverse through the south and east portions of town. The city of Searcy has the nearest airport, as the Searcy Regional Airport is located 15 miles (24 km) northeast of Beebe. Passenger service is available at Clinton National Airport, approximately 35 miles (56 km) southwest of Beebe on the east side of the city of Little Rock.

== Repeated blackbird death incidents ==
Beebe made international news in early January 2011 following the death of more than 3,000 red-winged blackbirds and European starlings over the community. Arkansas state wildlife authorities first received reports on December 31, 2010, shortly before midnight. Further investigation revealed the birds fell over a one-mile (1.6 km) area of Beebe, with no other dead birds found outside that concentrated zone. The birds showed signs of physical trauma, leading one ornithologist with the Arkansas Game and Fish Commission to speculate the blackbirds might have been killed by lightning, high-altitude hail or possibly even fireworks. The birds were sent to laboratories in Georgia and Wisconsin for necropsies and to determine the cause of death. On January 5, the Arkansas Game and Fish Commission confirmed that the incident was caused by a resident setting off professional-grade fireworks, startling the birds into a panic flight.

On New Year's Eve 2011, a few hours before entering into 2012, blackbirds again were reported to be falling to the ground in Beebe. Several hundred had plunged to their deaths according to the local television station KATV which also reported that its radar had shown a "large mass" over the town. A later report estimated the count as high as 5,000 dead birds.
