= Prairie County Home Guard =

- Flag of the Confederacy, 1861-1863
- Active: 1861-1862
- Country: Confederate States of America
- Allegiance: Confederate States of America
- Role: Local Defense
- Garrison/HQ: Prairie County

Commanders
- Col.: Pleasant A. Thomason

The Prairie County Home Guard was a military unit created during the American Civil War by the Arkansas Secession Convention. Home Guard units were created to establish a local defense force, made up of those who were too young or old to enlist in confederate units, which were organized at the county level.

== History ==
On May 30, 1861, the Arkansas Secession Convention passed an ordinance that called on every county to organize a Home Guard for local defense as the state prepared for war. The ordinance required that these Home Guard units be made up of companies from each township. In response to this, the Prairie County Court met at Brownsville, the then county seat, on June 24, 1861, where they went about organizing a Home Guard by appointing Pleasant A. Thomason as Colonel of the unit as well as appointing three other men to be War Finance Commissioners. The commissioners would be responsible for the arming of the unit. The following July each of the county's ten townships organized one company whose officers they subsequently voted on.

The following is a list of all ten home guard companies along with their place and date of appointment:

- Caroline Home Guard – Austin, June 29, 1861
- Richwoods Home Guard – Richwoods, July 3, 1861
- Pigeon Roost Home Guard – Hickory Plains, July 3, 1861
- Clear Lake Home Guard – Clear Lake, July 5, 1861
- White River Home Guard – Des Arc, July 6, 1861
- Hamilton Home Guard – Hamilton Church, July 11, 1861
- LaGrue Home Guard – LaGrue, July 11, 1861
- Wattensaw Home Guard – Devall's Bluff, July 11, 1861
- Center Home Guard – Walter's Chapel, July 15, 1861
- Prairie Home Guard – Brownsville, July 16, 1861

In total, the Prairie County home guard numbered 165 men and the unit would continue to operate into 1862, though numerous members would eventually join various other confederate units and the Home Guard would be dissolved.
