= Sears House (Austin, Arkansas) =

Historic American building

- U.S. National Register of Historic Places
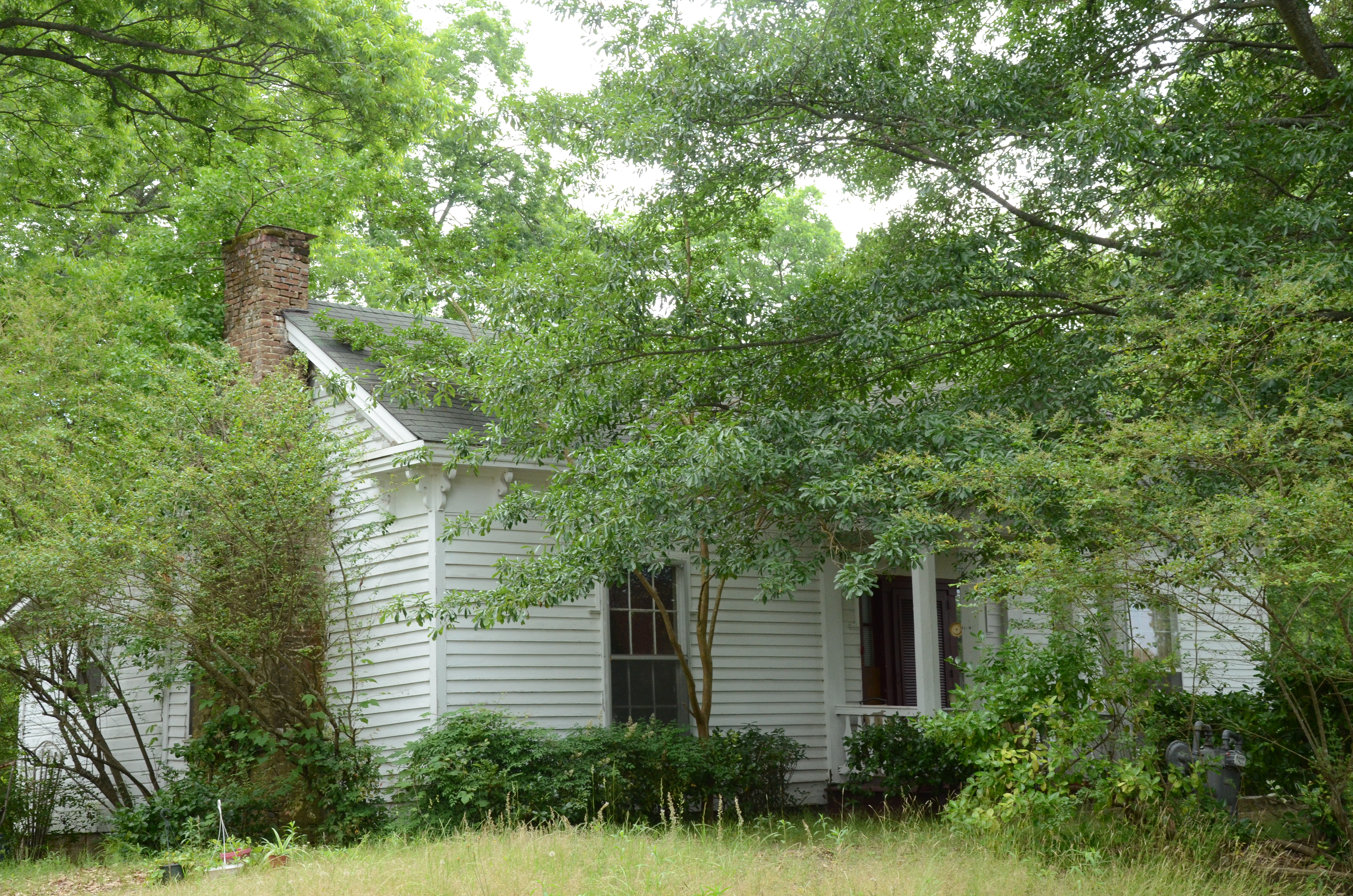

- Location within Arkansas Location within the United States
- Nearest city: Austin, Arkansas
- Coordinates: 34°59′5″N 91°57′43″W
- Area: less than one acre
- Built: 1860
- Architectural style: Greek Revival, Italianate
- NRHP reference No.: 92000952
- Added to NRHP: August 5, 1992

The Sears House is a historic house on Moss Lane, southeast of the junction of Arkansas Highways 38 and 319 in Austin, Arkansas. It is a single story wood-frame structure, with a side gable roof, weatherboard siding, and a foundation of wood and concrete blocks. The roof gable is bracketed in the Italianate style, while the main entrance is sheltered by a project gabled Greek Revival portico. The house was built about 1860 and is a rare surviving example of an antebellum late Greek Revival-Italianate house.

The house was listed on the National Register of Historic Places in 1992.

== See also ==
- National Register of Historic Places listings in Lonoke County, Arkansas
