= England High School =

Location
- 501 Pine Bluff Highway; England, Arkansas 72046; United States; 34°32′27″N 91°57′17″W

Information
- School type: Public comprehensive
- Status: Open
- School district: England School District
- CEEB code: 040730
- NCES School ID: 050585000296
- Principal: Trent Morgan Brittney Robinson
- Teaching staff: 27.61 (on FTE basis)
- Grades: 7–12
- Enrollment: 279 (2023-2024)
- Student to teacher ratio: 10.11
- Education system: ADE Smart Core
- Classes offered: Regular, Advanced Placement (AP)
- Colors: Purple and gold
- Athletics: Basketball, Baseball, Softball, Track, Cheer
- Athletics conference: 2A Region 5 (Basketball)
- Mascot: Lion
- Team name: England Lions
- Accreditation: ADE; AdvancED (1929–)
- Website: www.englandlions.net/page/high-school

England High School is an accredited comprehensive public high school located in the rural community of England, Arkansas, United States. The school provides secondary education for approximately 350 students each year in grades 7 through 12. It is one of four public high schools in Lonoke County, Arkansas and the only high school administered by the England School District. In addition to England, the boundary of its school district, and therefore of the school itself, includes Coy and Keo.

== Academics ==
England High School is accredited by the Arkansas Department of Education (ADE) and has been accredited by AdvancED since 1929. The assumed course of study follows the Smart Core curriculum developed by the ADE. Students complete regular (core and elective) and career focus coursework and exams and may take Advanced Placement (AP) courses and exams with the opportunity to receive college credit.

== Athletics ==
England High School's mascot and athletic emblem is the lion, with purple and gold serving as the school colors.

The England Lions compete in interscholastic activities within the 2A Classification via the 2A Region 5 Conference, as administered by the Arkansas Activities Association (AAA). The Lions have sports teams in basketball, cheer, baseball, football, softball, and track and field.

The England boys basketball team won the 2015 2A state championship, 64-62 over Junction City.
