= Keo, Arkansas =

- Town
- Location in Lonoke County, Arkansas

- Location in the United States
- Coordinates: 34°36′32″N 92°00′31″W
- Country: United States
- State: Arkansas
- County: Lonoke

Area
  - Total: 4.96 sq mi (12.85 km^{2})
  - Land: 4.92 sq mi (12.75 km^{2})
  - Water: 0.039 sq mi (0.10 km^{2})
- Elevation: 226 ft (69 m)

Population (2020)
  - Total: 207
  - Estimate (2025): 202 ▼
  - Density: 42.0/sq mi (16.23/km^{2})
- Time zone: UTC-6 (Central (CST))
  - Summer (DST): UTC-5 (CDT)
- ZIP code: 72083
- Area code: 501
- FIPS code: 05-36550
- GNIS feature ID: 2405940
- Website: www.keoar.com

Keo is a town in southwest Lonoke County, Arkansas, United States. As of the 2020 census, Keo had a population of 207. It is part of the Little Rock–North Little Rock–Conway Metropolitan Statistical Area.

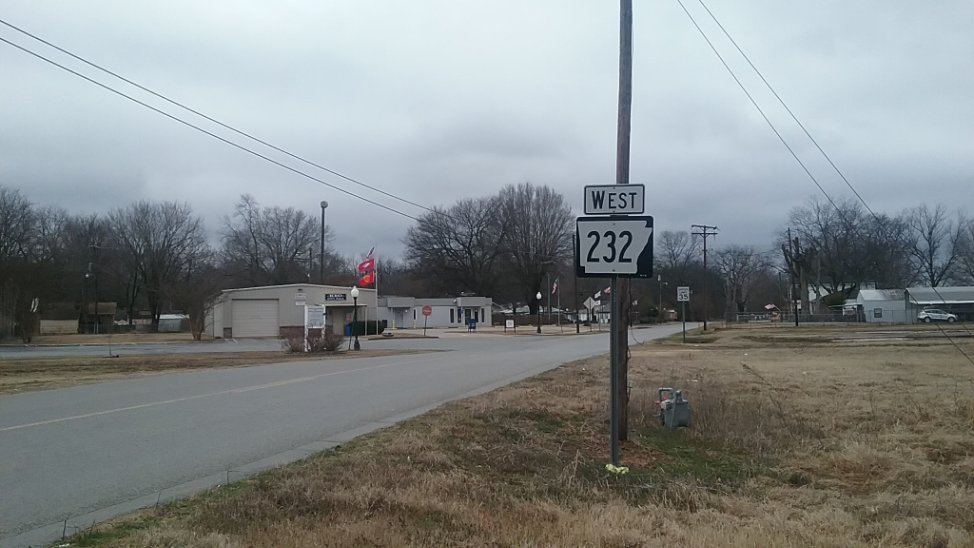
Arkansas State Highway 232 runs west out of Keo.

== History ==
Keo had its start as a shipping station when the railroad was extended to that point.

== Geography ==
Keo is located in southwestern Lonoke County. U.S. Route 165 passes through the town, leading northwest 19 miles (31 km) to North Little Rock and southeast 4 miles (6 km) to England. Arkansas Highway 15 leads north from Keo 16 miles (26 km) to Furlow and southeast with US 165 to England. Arkansas Highway 232 leads west from the center of Keo.

According to the United States Census Bureau, the town has a total area of 4.9 square miles (12.7 km^{2}), of which 0.04 square miles (0.1 km^{2}), or 0.70%, are water.

== Demographics ==
Historical population
Census	Pop.	Note	%±
1910	175		—
1920	325		85.7%
1930	267		−17.8%
1940	253		−5.2%
1950	200		−20.9%
1960	237		18.5%
1970	226		−4.6%
1980	208		−8.0%
1990	154		−26.0%
2000	235		52.6%
2010	256		8.9%
2020	207		−19.1%
2025 (est.)	202	▼	−2.4%
U.S. Decennial Census

As of the census of 2000, there were 235 people, 96 households, and 69 families residing in the town. The population density was 123.9 inhabitants per square mile (47.8/km^{2}). There were 108 housing units at an average density of 56.9 per square mile (22.0/km^{2}). The racial makeup of the town was 19.87% White, 80.33% Black or African American, 0.43% from other races. 1.70% of the population were Hispanic or Latino of any race.

There were 96 households, out of which 28.1% had children under the age of 18 living with them, 59.4% were married couples living together, 7.3% had a female householder with no husband present, and 28.1% were non-families. 27.1% of all households were made up of individuals, and 10.4% had someone living alone who was 65 years of age or older. The average household size was 2.45 and the average family size was 2.97.

In the town, the population was spread out, with 23.8% under the age of 18, 6.0% from 18 to 24, 26.8% from 25 to 44, 24.7% from 45 to 64, and 18.7% who were 65 years of age or older. The median age was 40 years. For every 100 females, there were 102.6 males. For every 100 females age 18 and over, there were 103.4 males.

The median income for a household in the town was $40,250, and the median income for a family was $43,333. Males had a median income of $24,028 versus $26,000 for females. The per capita income for the town was $21,159. About 10.3% of families and 18.3% of the population were below the poverty line, including 38.3% of those under the age of eighteen and 7.0% of those 65 or over.

== Commerce and industry ==
Keo is known as one of Arkansas' largest pecan producers with a rich history in farming of cotton and rice. As in much of the surrounding region, agriculture is the driving economic force in the area around Keo, primarily in the cultivation of cotton, rice, soybean, and fish farms.

== Climate ==
The climate in this area is characterized by hot, humid summers and generally mild to cool winters. According to the Köppen Climate Classification system, Keo has a humid subtropical climate, abbreviated "Cfa" on climate maps.

Climate data for Keo, Arkansas (1991–2020 normals, extremes 1948–present)
Month	Jan	Feb	Mar	Apr	May	Jun	Jul	Aug	Sep	Oct	Nov	Dec	Year
Record high °F (°C)	81 (27)	83 (28)	91 (33)	93 (34)	96 (36)	103 (39)	106 (41)	107 (42)	103 (39)	95 (35)	88 (31)	81 (27)	107 (42)
Mean maximum °F (°C)	70.0 (21.1)	73.7 (23.2)	80.5 (26.9)	84.7 (29.3)	89.2 (31.8)	93.8 (34.3)	96.5 (35.8)	96.8 (36.0)	92.9 (33.8)	87.5 (30.8)	78.0 (25.6)	70.9 (21.6)	98.1 (36.7)
Mean daily maximum °F (°C)	49.5 (9.7)	54.3 (12.4)	63.1 (17.3)	72.5 (22.5)	80.0 (26.7)	86.9 (30.5)	89.5 (31.9)	88.8 (31.6)	83.5 (28.6)	73.8 (23.2)	61.0 (16.1)	51.9 (11.1)	71.2 (21.8)
Daily mean °F (°C)	40.3 (4.6)	44.3 (6.8)	52.5 (11.4)	61.6 (16.4)	70.0 (21.1)	77.3 (25.2)	80.0 (26.7)	78.9 (26.1)	72.6 (22.6)	62.3 (16.8)	50.8 (10.4)	42.8 (6.0)	61.1 (16.2)
Mean daily minimum °F (°C)	31.1 (−0.5)	34.3 (1.3)	41.8 (5.4)	50.6 (10.3)	59.9 (15.5)	67.7 (19.8)	70.5 (21.4)	68.9 (20.5)	61.7 (16.5)	50.7 (10.4)	40.6 (4.8)	33.8 (1.0)	51.0 (10.6)
Mean minimum °F (°C)	17.1 (−8.3)	21.2 (−6.0)	26.9 (−2.8)	37.5 (3.1)	47.9 (8.8)	60.3 (15.7)	65.0 (18.3)	62.7 (17.1)	49.8 (9.9)	37.1 (2.8)	27.3 (−2.6)	21.6 (−5.8)	14.4 (−9.8)
Record low °F (°C)	−5 (−21)	−3 (−19)	12 (−11)	29 (−2)	38 (3)	48 (9)	54 (12)	50 (10)	34 (1)	24 (−4)	15 (−9)	−4 (−20)	−5 (−21)
Average precipitation inches (mm)	3.84 (98)	4.02 (102)	5.05 (128)	5.50 (140)	4.80 (122)	3.36 (85)	3.53 (90)	2.98 (76)	3.14 (80)	4.39 (112)	4.46 (113)	5.46 (139)	50.53 (1,283)
Average snowfall inches (cm)	1.0 (2.5)	1.4 (3.6)	0.5 (1.3)	0.0 (0.0)	0.0 (0.0)	0.0 (0.0)	0.0 (0.0)	0.0 (0.0)	0.0 (0.0)	0.0 (0.0)	0.0 (0.0)	0.1 (0.25)	3.0 (7.6)
Average precipitation days (≥ 0.01 in)	8.9	9.1	9.8	9.0	9.9	6.8	7.1	6.4	6.2	7.2	7.9	8.9	97.2
Average snowy days (≥ 0.1 in)	0.6	0.6	0.2	0.0	0.0	0.0	0.0	0.0	0.0	0.0	0.0	0.1	1.5
Source: NOAA

== Education ==
Keo is in the England School District, which includes England High School.
