= Susan Schulte =

Arkansas politician

Susan Lynn Schulte (née Grider, born February 25, 1957) is an American politician. From 2003 to 2008, she served in the Arkansas House of Representatives as a Republican.

Susan Lynn Grider was born February 25, 1957, in Nuremberg to Shirley Ann Moore and Mack Carlton Grider, who served in the United States Army. Though her parents were from Warren, Arkansas, they travelled due to her father's position in the military. Grider attended kindergarten in Hawaii; elementary school in Enid, Oklahoma; and Little Rock Central High School in Little Rock, Arkansas, graduating in 1974. She then graduated from the University of Arkansas at Little Rock.

She lives in Cabot, Arkansas and is a real estate appraiser.
