= Camp Nelson Confederate Cemetery =

Historic cemetery in Lonoke County, Arkansas, US

- U.S. National Register of Historic Places
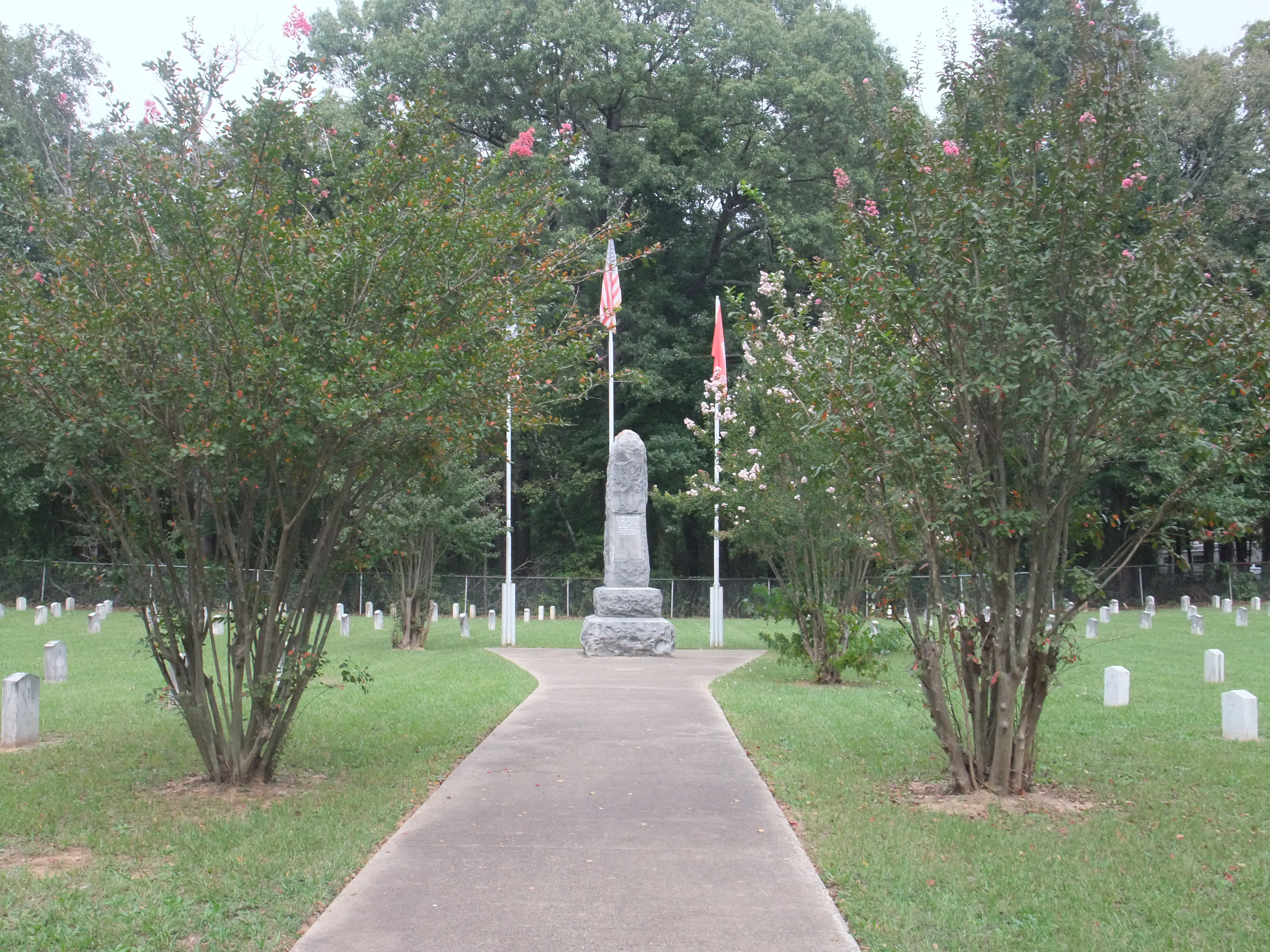

- Location within Arkansas Location within the United States
- Location: Rye St., approximately 1 mi. NW of jct. of AR 321 and AR 319, Cabot, Arkansas
- Coordinates: 34°56′46″N 91°58′50″W
- Built: 1905; 121 years ago
- MPS: Civil War Commemorative Sculpture MPS
- NRHP reference No.: 96000503
- Added to NRHP: May 3, 1996

Camp Nelson Confederate Cemetery is a historic cemetery located near Cabot in northern Lonoke County, Arkansas and is near the site of a Confederate military camp Camp Hope (renamed Camp Nelson), where 1,500 Confederate soldiers died during an epidemic during the fall of 1862. Camp Nelson Cemetery is located on Rye Drive, just off Cherry Road, just off Mt. Carmel Road in north Lonoke County about 2 miles east of Cabot.

== History ==
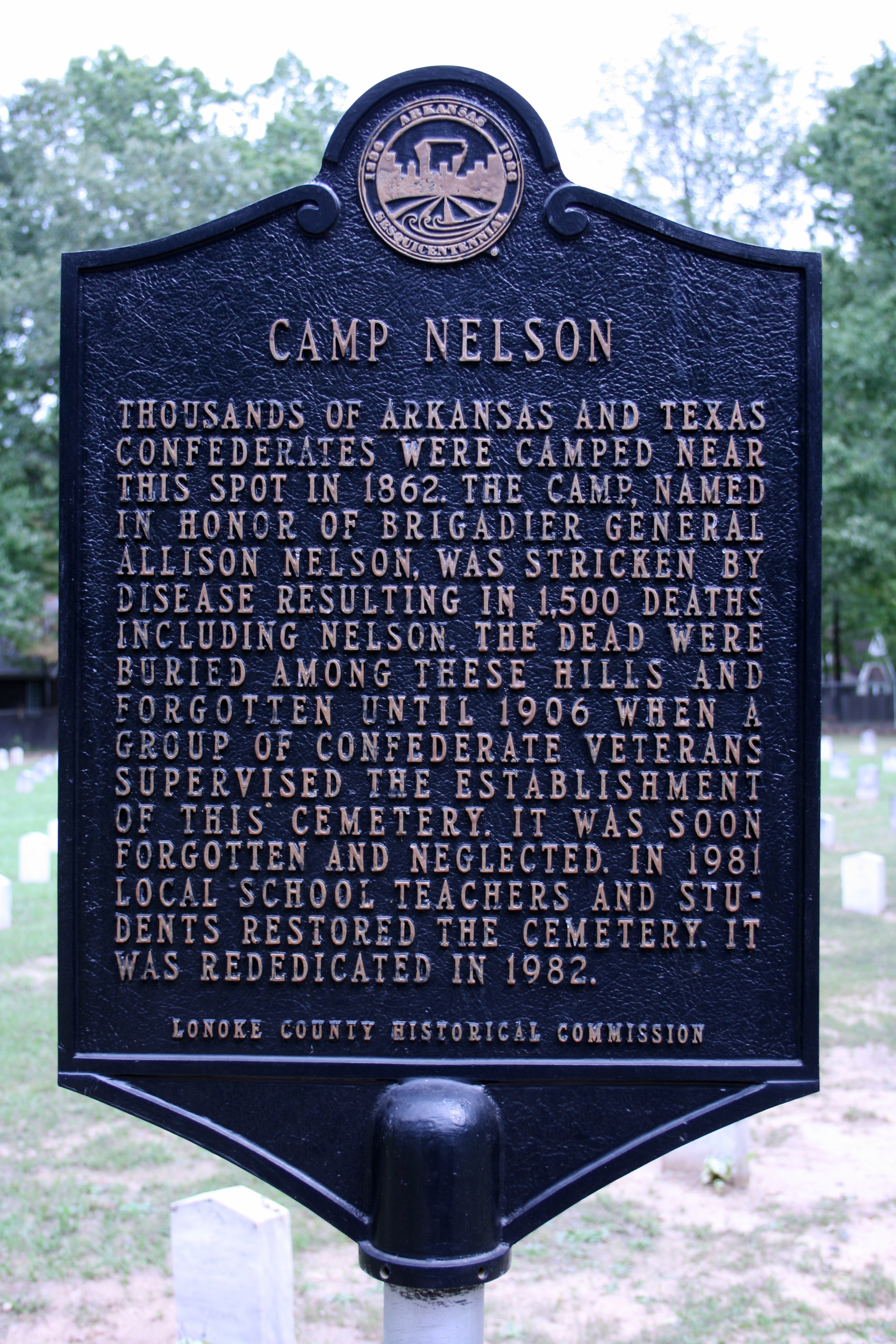
Historical marker

Camp Hope was established in the spring of 1862 as a central staging point in central Arkansas for Confederate troops gathering from Texas and Arkansas. The camp was renamed for Brigadier General Allison Nelson, commander of the 10th Texas Infantry Regiment, after he died there in October 1862.

During the fall of 1862, an epidemic of measles, typhoid fever, mumps, and other diseases ran rampant through the troops congregated there. Brigadier General Nelson was among the approximately 1,500 Arkansas and Texas soldiers who died from disease-related conditions during a two-month period, from early October to early December. The majority of these soldiers were buried in unmarked graves in the surrounding area. The camp was abandoned by the end of 1862.

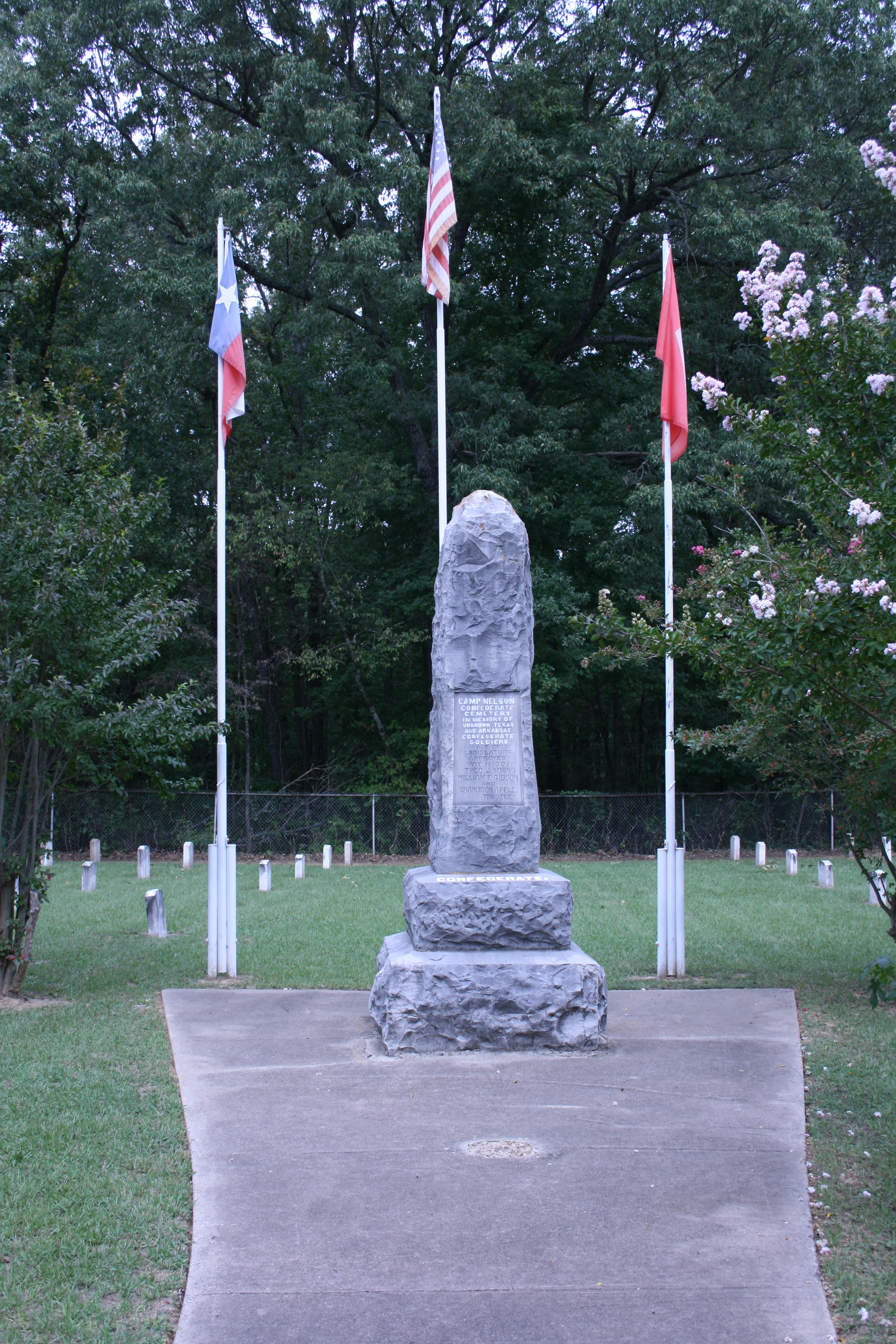
Cemetery monument

In 1905, Confederate veterans located 429 graves and reinterred the remains on land donated for a cemetery near the original camp site. They placed 429 limestone markers, all marked "Unknown Soldier CSA", and erected a 12-foot obelisk to memorialize those buried here. Improperly maintained after the death of the last Civil War Veterans, the site was ultimately overtaken by forest undergrowth.

The cemetery was reclaimed before the end of the century, however, after local high school teachers, members of the Cabot High School Reserve Officers’ Training Corps, Future Farmers of America students, and other area residents embarked on a restoration project during the 1980s with state funding. Renovations included clearing and leveling the land, replacing the fence and gate, and replacing the markers with new United States government headstones. The state appropriation for upkeep ended in the late 1990s leaving the cemetery maintenance up to interested residents. The Camp Nelson Confederate Cemetery was listed on the National Register of Historic Places in 1996.

== Photo gallery ==
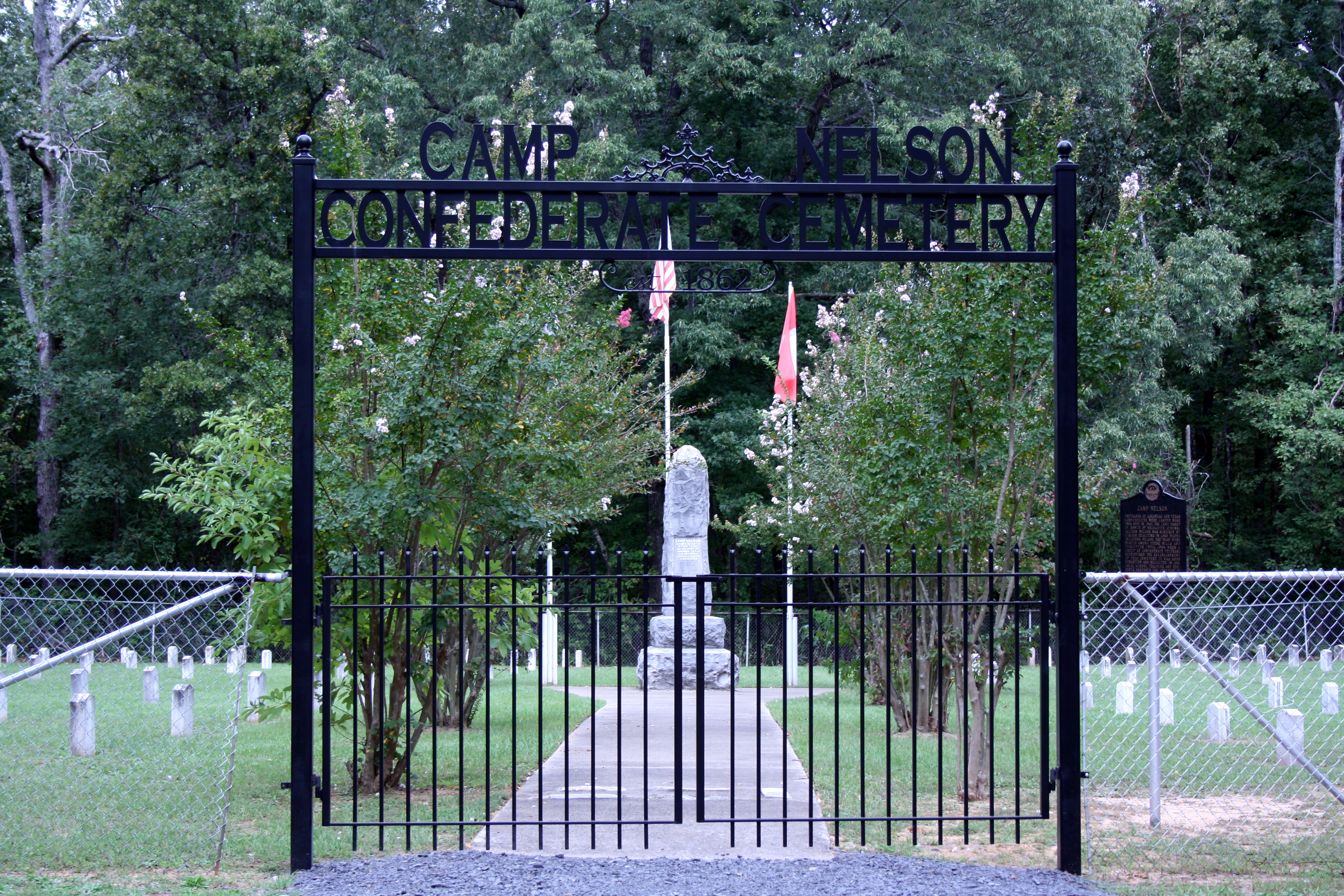

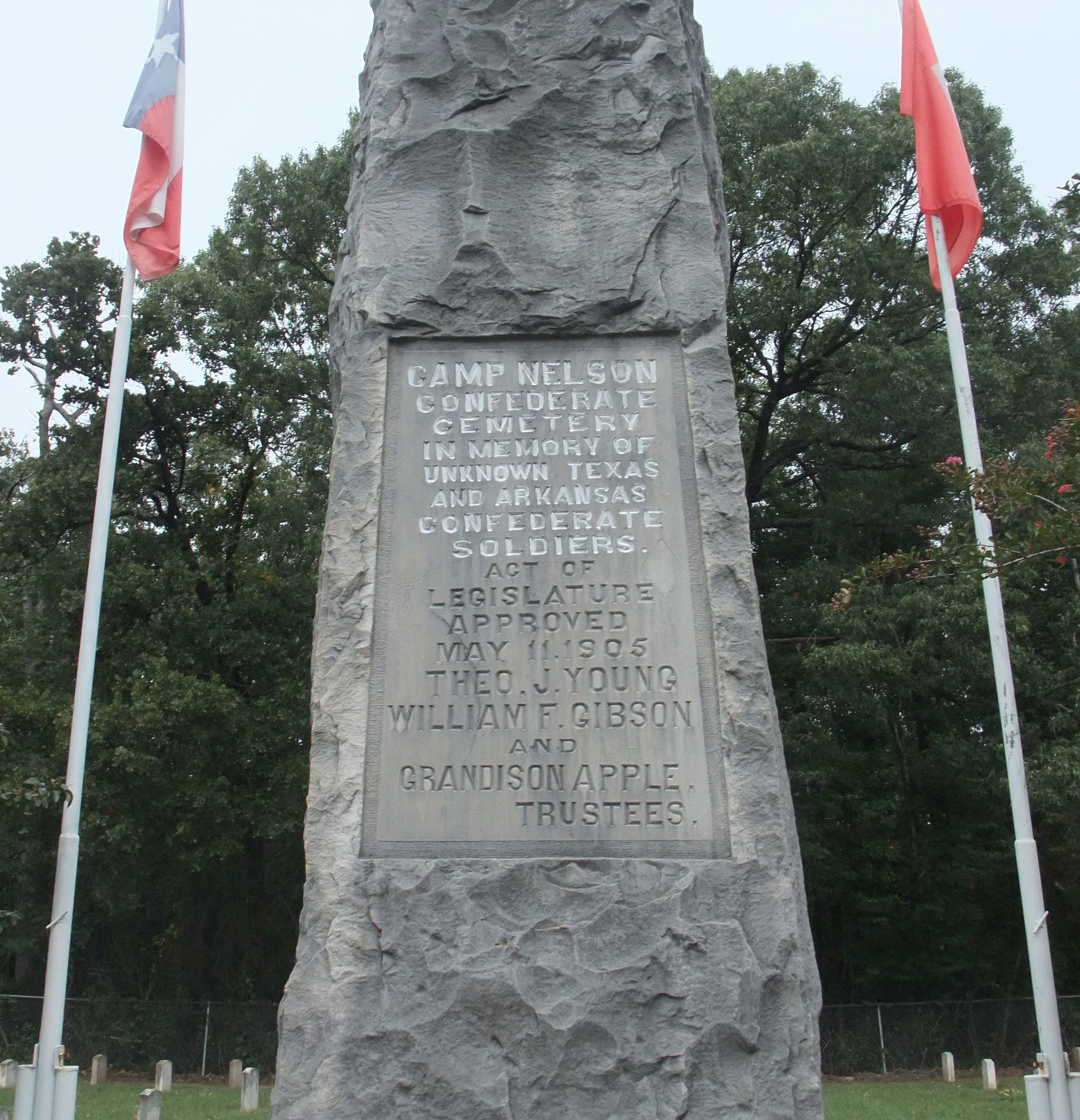

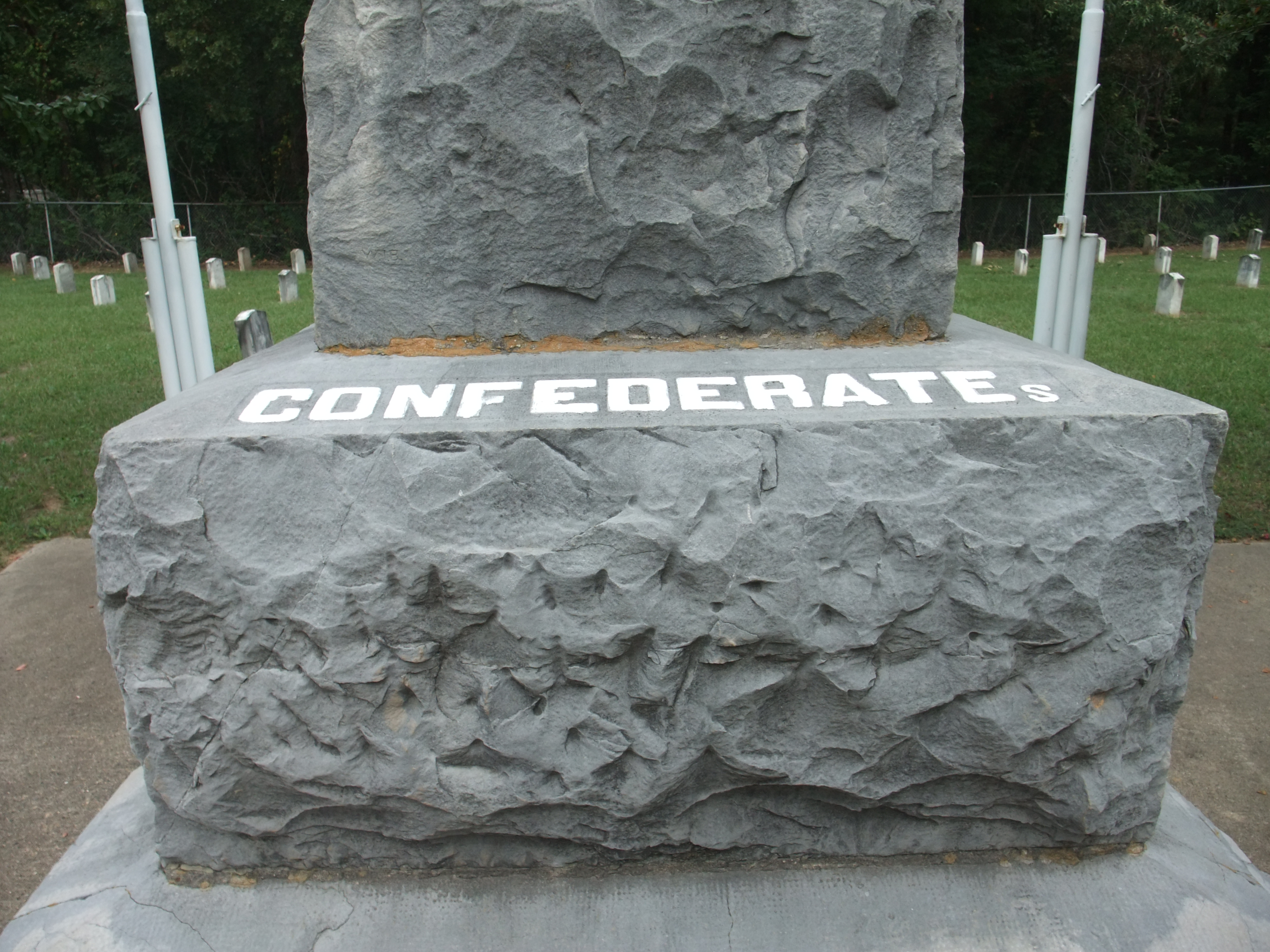

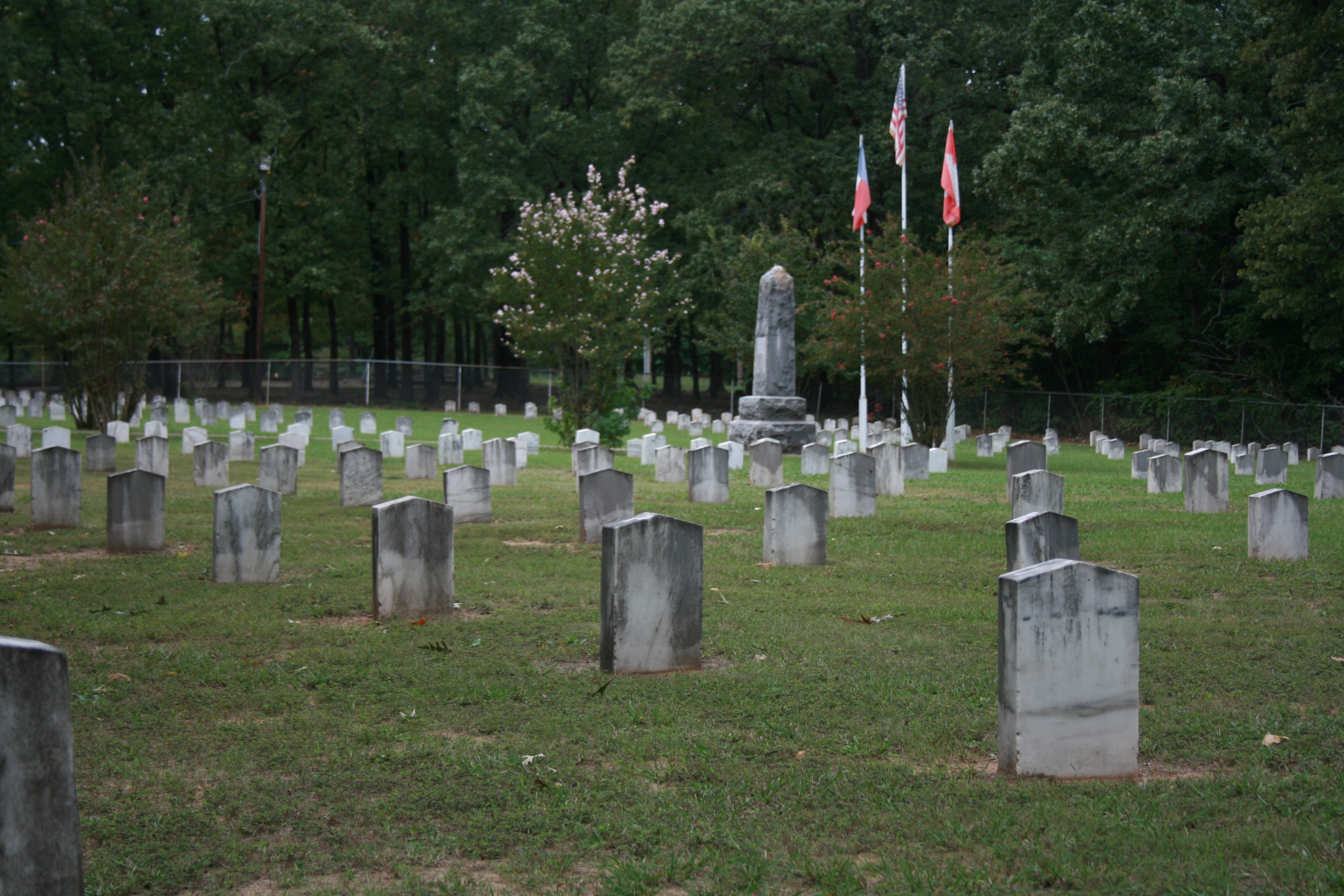

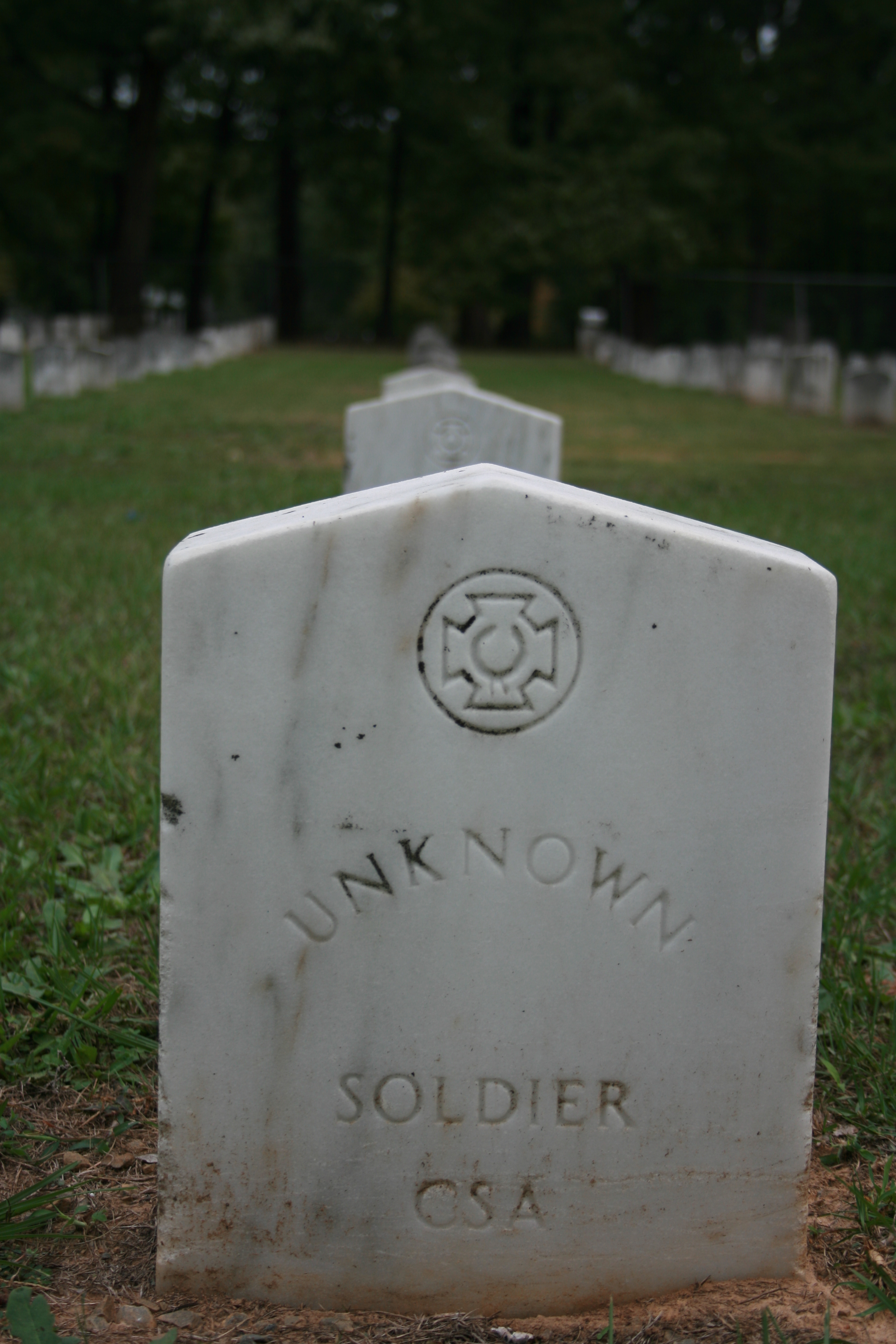

== See also ==
- National Register of Historic Places listings in Lonoke County, Arkansas
