= Madison K. Moran =

American state legislator

Madison K. Moran was a state legislator in Arkansas who served during the 1913 Arkansas House of Representatives session. He lived in Lonoke County. He proposed a bill making it a felony for a woman to enter a bathroom designated for men.
