= A. W. Bumpass =

Educator and lawyer

Augustine W. Bumpass was an educator and lawyer who served one term in the Arkansas Senate for Lonoke County in 1879. He belonged to the Democratic Party. He married Virginia Kirk and they had five children, four sons and a daughter. He was a Sunday School superintendent.
