= Coy, Arkansas =

- Town
- Location in Lonoke County, Arkansas

- Location in the United States
- Coordinates: 34°32′31″N 91°52′11″W
- Country: United States
- State: Arkansas
- County: Lonoke

Area
  - Total: 0.67 sq mi (1.74 km^{2})
  - Land: 0.67 sq mi (1.74 km^{2})
  - Water: 0 sq mi (0.00 km^{2})
- Elevation: 217 ft (66 m)

Population (2020)
  - Total: 87
  - Estimate (2025): 91 ▲
  - Density: 129.4/sq mi (49.96/km^{2})
- Time zone: UTC-6 (Central (CST))
  - Summer (DST): UTC-5 (CDT)
- ZIP code: 72037
- Area code: 501
- FIPS code: 05-15790
- GNIS feature ID: 0057595

Coy is a town in southern Lonoke County, Arkansas, United States. The population was 87 at the 2020 census, making it the smallest incorporated community within the Little Rock–North Little Rock–Conway Metropolitan Statistical Area, as well as one of the smallest in the state.

== Geography ==
Coy is located in southern Lonoke County. U.S. Route 165 passes through the northern side of the town, leading east 6 miles (10 km) to Humnoke and west 5 miles (8 km) to England. Arkansas Highway 31 passes through the center of Coy, leading north 19 miles (31 km) to Lonoke, the county seat, and south 15 miles (24 km) to Sherrill.

According to the United States Census Bureau, the town of Coy has a total area of 0.66 square miles (1.7 km^{2}), all land.

== Demographics ==
Historical population
Census	Pop.	Note	%±
1960	206		—
1970	240		16.5%
1980	183		−23.7%
1990	142		−22.4%
2000	116		−18.3%
2010	96		−17.2%
2020	87		−9.4%
2025 (est.)	91	▲	4.6%
U.S. Decennial Census; 2015 Estimate

At the 2000 census, there were 116 people, 46 households and 32 families residing in the town. The population density was 66.8/km^{2} (172.1/mi^{2}). There were 49 housing units at an average density of 28.2/km^{2} (72.7/mi^{2}). The racial makeup of the town was 86.21% White and 13.79% Black or African American. 2.59% of the population were Hispanic or Latino of any race.

There were 46 households, of which 32.6% had children under the age of 18 living with them, 60.9% were married couples living together, 8.7% had a female householder with no husband present, and 28.3% were non-families. 23.9% of all households were made up of individuals, and 10.9% had someone living alone who was 65 years of age or older. The average household size was 2.52 and the average family size was 2.94.

19.0% of the population were under the age of 18, 12.1% from 18 to 24, 23.3% from 25 to 44, 28.4% from 45 to 64, and 17.2% who were 65 years of age or older. The median age was 42 years. For every 100 females, there were 90.2 males. For every 100 females age 18 and over, there were 91.8 males.

The median household income was $26,406 and the median family income was $36,875. Males had a median income of $25,000 versus $25,625 for females. The per capita income for the town was $12,819. There were 3.7% of families and 6.0% of the population living below the poverty line, including no under eighteens and 29.4% of those over 64.

== Education ==
Coy is in the England School District, which includes England High School.
