= George M. Chapline =

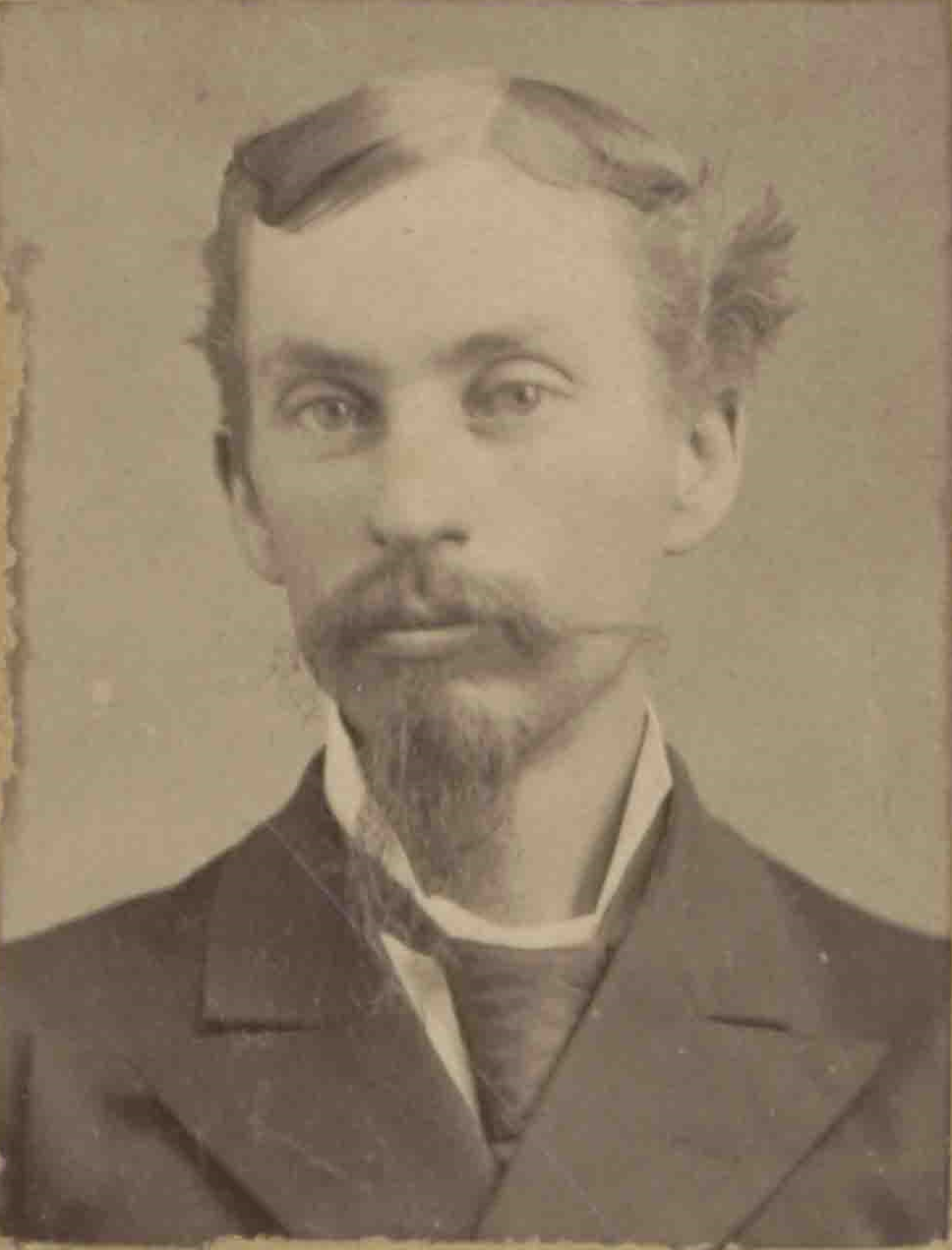

George M. Chapline was a state legislator and county clerk in Arkansas. He served in the legislature in 1881 representing Lonoke County.

He served as clerk of Lonoke County for several years, some of them non consecutively.

Thomas C. Trimble was his law partner for a while.
