= England Public School District =

School district in Arkansas, United States

Address
- 501 Pine Bluff Highway England, Arkansas, 72046; United States

District information
- Type: Public
- Grades: PreK–12
- NCES District ID: 0505850

Students and staff
- Students: 643
- Teachers: 57.74
- Staff: 67.5
- Student–teacher ratio: 11.14

Other information
- Website: www.englandlions.net

The England Public School District is a school district headquartered in England, Arkansas, United States. It serves territory in Lonoke County, including England, Coy, and Keo.

The district has two schools, England Elementary School (Grades K-8) and England High School (Grades 7–12).

In 1968 the England School District started a night program at the Tucker Unit, an Arkansas Department of Correction prison in Tucker.
