= Una Roberts Lawrence =

American writer

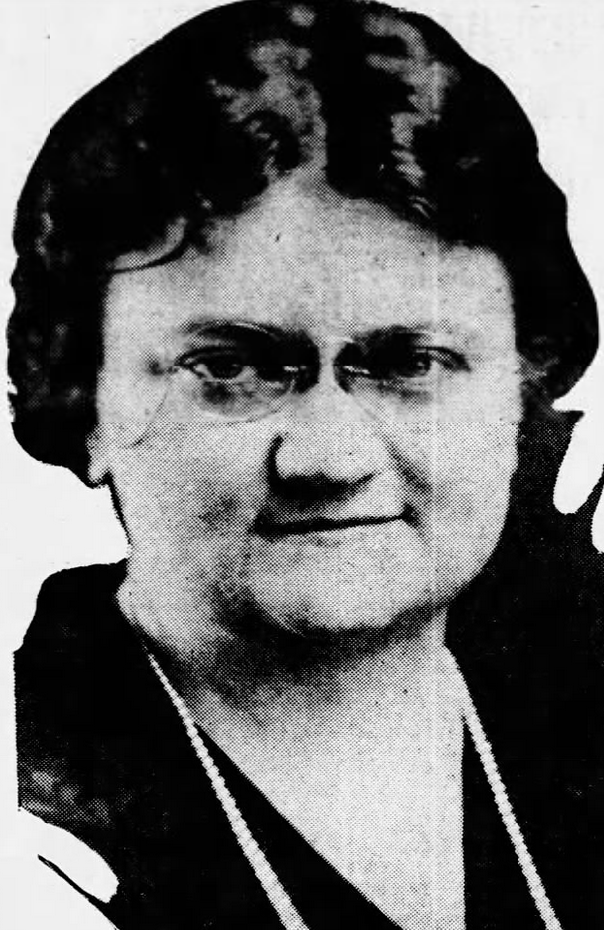
- Una Roberts Lawrence, from a 1927 newspaper
- Born: Una Roberts; August 6, 1893; Gainesville, Arkansas, U.S.
- Died: January 13, 1972 (aged 78); Jacksonville, Arkansas, U.S.
- Occupations: Writer, missionary

Una Roberts Lawrence (August 6, 1893 – January 13, 1972) was an American writer and educator affiliated with the Woman's Missionary Union and Home Mission Board of the Southern Baptist Convention.

== Early life and education ==
Lawrence was born in Gainesville, Arkansas, the daughter of Hulett Wayne Roberts and Mary Moffett Roberts. Her father was a school principal. She graduated from Cabot High School in 1910 and from Central College in 1918; she earned a teaching degree from Woman's Missionary Union Training School in 1919, with other studies at the Baars School of Music, Ouachita College and the University of Louisville.

== Career ==
Lawrence taught in public school and was a piano teacher as a young woman. She was secretary for Young People with the Arkansas Woman's Missionary Union from 1920 to 1926, and mission study editor for the Home Mission Board from 1926 to 1947. She gave one-day workshops at local churches, spoke at denominational conferences, and conducted surveys to identify ministry needs among Southern Baptist churches in Appalachia. She wrote a biography of missionary Lottie Moon. She made four speaking trips to Cuba, and attended a denominational meeting in Rio de Janeiro in 1930. In 1934, she worked with Nannie Helen Burroughs to relaunch a missionary magazine, The Worker. In 1937, she was named to the President's Committee on Farm Tenancy.

== Publications ==
Lawrence's published works were mainly for use in Southern Baptist churches, classes, and study groups.

- The King's Own (1920)
- Cuba for Christ (1925)
- The Jesus Way Wigwam: Mission Work in Indian Territory (1926)
- Just Around the Corner Tales (1926)
- "The Challenge of Cuba and the Canal Zone" and "The Challenge of the Southern Indians" (1927)
- The Life of Lottie Moon (1927)
- Pioneer Women (1929)
- The Word of Their Testimony (1932)
- The Keys of the Kingdom (1932)
- The Personal Service Guide (1934)
- Winning the Border (1935)
- "When the Rain Came" (1937)
- The Trail of Seeds (1940)
- Katie of the Canyon (1947)
- Resource Book: Evangelism in Home Missions (1947)
- These Were First (1948, with Margaret Kine Eubanks)
- "Cowboy of the Amazon" and "The Gospel Cavalryman of the Cane Fields" (1948)

== Personal life ==
Roberts married Irwin Lawrence in 1920. She lived in Kansas City, Missouri, beginning in the 1930s. She died in 1972, at the age of 78, at a hospital in Jacksonville, Arkansas. A large collection of her papers are in the Southern Baptist Historical Library and Archives.
