= Lower White River Museum State Park =

Museum in Arkansas, USA

- Location in Arkansas Lower White River Museum (the United States)
- Former names: Des Arc Archeological Center Bethell Pioneer Museum, Des Arc Archeological Museum, Prairie County Museum
- Established: 1970
- Location: 2009 Main Street, Des Arc, Arkansas, United States
- Coordinates: 34°58′37″N 91°30′58″W
- Type: History
- Website: Lower White River Museum State Park

Lower White River Museum State Park is a state-run museum located on Main Street in Des Arc, Prairie County, Arkansas, United States, that interprets the history of the lower portion of Arkansas’s White River during the hundred-year period of 1831-1931. Founded in 1970, the museum underwent several name changes before falling under the purview of the museum services division of the parks and tourism department in 1979.
