= Ward, Arkansas =

- City
- Location of Ward in Lonoke County, Arkansas.

- Location in the United States
- Coordinates: 35°00′12″N 91°57′38″W
- Country: United States
- State: Arkansas
- County: Lonoke

Government
  - Type: mayor-council
  - Mayor: Charles Gastineau

Area
  - Total: 4.31 sq mi (11.15 km^{2})
  - Land: 4.31 sq mi (11.15 km^{2})
  - Water: 0 sq mi (0.00 km^{2})
- Elevation: 269 ft (82 m)

Population (2020)
  - Total: 6,052
  - Estimate (2025): 7,258 ▲
  - Density: 1,406.2/sq mi (542.93/km^{2})
- Time zone: UTC-6 (Central (CST))
  - Summer (DST): UTC-5 (CDT)
- ZIP code: 72176
- Area code: 501
- FIPS code: 05-73130
- GNIS feature ID: 2405670
- Website: www.wardarkansas.org

Ward is the second most populous city in Lonoke County, Arkansas, United States. The population was 6,052 at the 2020 census. It is part of the Little Rock–North Little Rock–Conway Metropolitan Statistical Area.

== Geography ==
According to the United States Census Bureau, the city has a total area of 3.9 square miles (10 km^{2}), all land.

The city is divided into three wards, progressing from the northeast to the southwest. In the city's first ward is its downtown, which is situated diagonally along a railroad line running parallel to Arkansas Highway 367 (the former path of U.S. Highway 67). The second ward contains the central portion of the city, its industrial area, and its access to the current Interstate 57/U.S. Highway 67/167. Arkansas Highway 319 (Peyton Street within the city south of Highway 367) is a primary thoroughfare in central Ward toward the southwestern section of the city. Some of the most recent development is in the city's third ward, situated mostly along Peyton Street, south of Wilson Street into the Old Austin community and Arkansas Highway 38; a small detached portion of the ward is located to the northwest along the railroad line and Arkansas Highway 367. Ward Central Elementary, the city's campus of the Cabot School District, is located in the larger portion of the third ward.

== Government ==
Ward is governed by a mayor-council form of municipal government, with a mayor, city clerk, and six-member city council, as well as five city departments — fire, police, street maintenance, utilities (water and wastewater) and Park and Recreation. City administration is housed in the former Ward Elementary School.

== Demographics ==
Historical population
Census	Pop.	Note	%±
1930	275		—
1940	283		2.9%
1950	364		28.6%
1960	470		29.1%
1970	619		31.7%
1980	981		58.5%
1990	1,269		29.4%
2000	2,580		103.3%
2010	4,067		57.6%
2020	6,052		48.8%
2025 (est.)	7,258	▲	19.9%
U.S. Decennial Census

=== 2020 census ===
As of the 2020 census, Ward had a population of 6,052. The median age was 30.0 years. 30.9% of residents were under the age of 18 and 8.3% of residents were 65 years of age or older. For every 100 females there were 96.1 males, and for every 100 females age 18 and over there were 91.8 males age 18 and over.

99.7% of residents lived in urban areas, while 0.3% lived in rural areas.

There were 2,202 households in Ward, and 1,331 families residing in the city. Of all households, 47.4% had children under the age of 18 living in them. 52.7% were married-couple households, 15.3% were households with a male householder and no spouse or partner present, and 23.7% were households with a female householder and no spouse or partner present. About 20.2% of all households were made up of individuals and 6.1% had someone living alone who was 65 years of age or older.

There were 2,376 housing units, of which 7.3% were vacant. The homeowner vacancy rate was 2.0% and the rental vacancy rate was 10.9%.

Ward racial composition
Race	Number	Percentage
White (non-Hispanic)	5,201	85.94%
Black or African American (non-Hispanic)	93	1.54%
Native American	37	0.61%
Asian	34	0.56%
Pacific Islander	3	0.05%
Other/Mixed	452	7.47%
Hispanic or Latino	232	3.83%

=== 2000 census ===
As of the census of 2000, there were 2,580 people, 938 households, and 726 families residing in the city. The population density was 662.4 inhabitants per square mile (255.8/km^{2}). There were 1,075 housing units at an average density of 276.0 per square mile (106.6/km^{2}). The racial makeup of the city was 97.33% White, 0.19% Black or African American, 0.78% Native American, 0.39% Asian, 0.16% from other races, and 1.16% from two or more races. 1.94% of the population were Hispanic or Latino of any race.

There were 938 households, out of which 46.7% had children under the age of 18 living with them, 60.3% were married couples living together, 12.4% had a female householder with no husband present, and 22.6% were non-families. 18.1% of all households were made up of individuals, and 5.1% had someone living alone who was 65 years of age or older. The average household size was 2.75 and the average family size was 3.13.

In the city, the population was spread out, with 32.9% under the age of 18, 9.1% from 18 to 24, 33.3% from 25 to 44, 16.9% from 45 to 64, and 7.7% who were 65 years of age or older. The median age was 29 years. For every 100 females, there were 95.6 males. For every 100 females age 18 and over, there were 91.4 males.

The median income for a household in the city was $32,924, and the median income for a family was $34,702. Males had a median income of $30,275 versus $21,151 for females. The per capita income for the city was $13,581. About 13.6% of families and 16.5% of the population were below the poverty line, including 18.8% of those under age 18 and 18.0% of those age 65 or over.

== Education ==
Public education for early childhood, elementary and secondary school students is provided from Cabot Public Schools, which leads to graduation from Cabot High School.
