= Arkansas Highway 319 =

State highway in Arkansas, United States

Highway 319

Route information
- Maintained by ArDOT

Section 1
- Length: 18.01 mi (28.98 km)
- South end: AR 38 in Ward
- Major intersections: I-57 / US 67 / US 167 in Ward
- North end: AR 107 south of Vilonia

Section 2
- Length: 1.65 mi (2.66 km)
- South end: Cadron Settlement Park
- North end: US 64 in Conway

Location
- Country: United States
- State: Arkansas

Highway system
- Arkansas Highway System; Interstate; US; State; Business; Spurs; Suffixed; Scenic; Heritage
← AR 318	→ AR 320

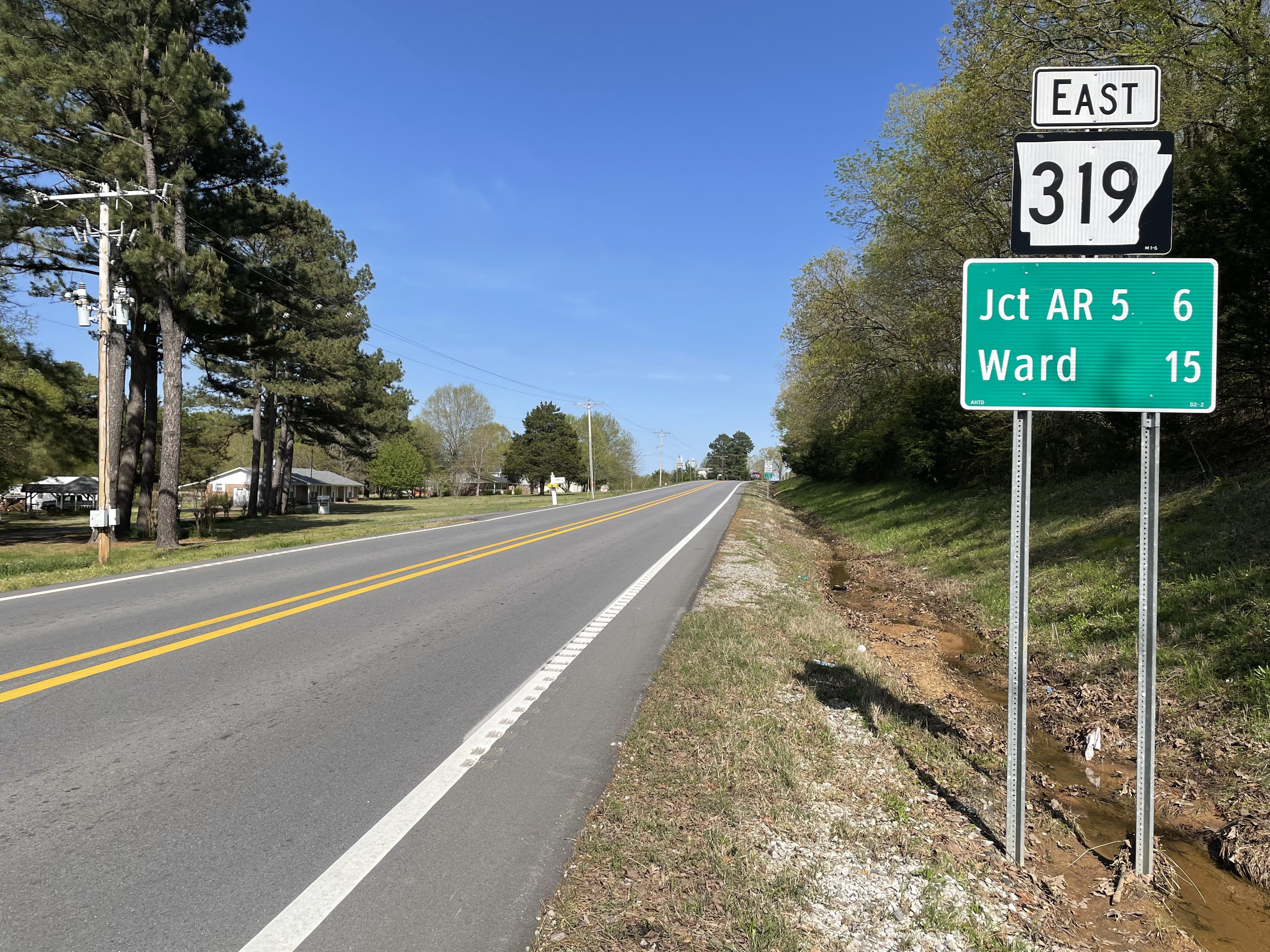
West Terminus of Highway 319 at Highway 107 south of Vilonia, Arkansas

Highway 319 (AR 319, Ark. 319, and Hwy. 319) is a designation for two state highways in central Arkansas. The main segment runs 18.01 miles (28.98 km) from AR 38 in Ward to AR 107 south of Vilonia. A short segment runs 1.65 miles (2.66 km) from Cadron Settlement Park to US 64 in Conway.

== Route description ==
=== Ward to Vilonia ===
The route begins at its southern terminus, Highway 38 in the unincorporated community of Old Austin. Highway 319 runs north through Ward, briefly concurring with Highway 367 before turning west and crossing I-57/US 67/US 167 at an interchange. The route continues west across Highway 5 to terminate at Highway 107 south of Vilonia.

=== Cadron Settlement Park to Conway ===
Highway 319 begins outside Conway at Cadron Settlement Park. The route runs northeast to US 64, where it terminates.

== Major intersections ==
County	Location	mi	km	Destinations	Notes
Lonoke	Ward	0.00	0.00	AR 38 – Des Arc	Southern terminus
Lonoke	Ward	2.98– 0.00	4.80– 0.00	AR 367	Former US 67
Lonoke	Ward	0.59	0.95	I-57 / US 67 / US 167 – Beebe, Little Rock	Exit 25 on I-57
Lonoke		8.94	14.39	AR 5 – Cabot, El Paso	
Faulkner		15.03	24.19	AR 107 – Sherwood, Vilonia	Northern terminus
Faulkner	Gap in route				
Faulkner	Cadron	0.00	0.00	Cadron Settlement Park	Southern terminus
Faulkner	Conway	1.65	2.66	US 64 – Conway, Menifee	Northern terminus
1.000 mi = 1.609 km; 1.000 km = 0.621 mi: Concurrency terminus
