= Cabot Public Schools =

School district in Arkansas

Cabot Public School District

Location
- Cabot, Arkansas, U.S.

Cabot Public Schools is a public school district system in northern Lonoke County, Arkansas, United States. It serves 10,292 students in grades PreK-12 across many campuses. This district includes students living in Cabot, Ward, and Austin, Arkansas. It is accredited by the Arkansas Department of Education.

The Cabot Public School Board is made up of seven members. All of the educators in this district are certified. The graduation rate in the district is 91%. The district has expansive technology resources for students with thousands of devices across the campuses. It is also the only school district in Arkansas to win the Arkansas Purple Star School Award.

== Schools ==
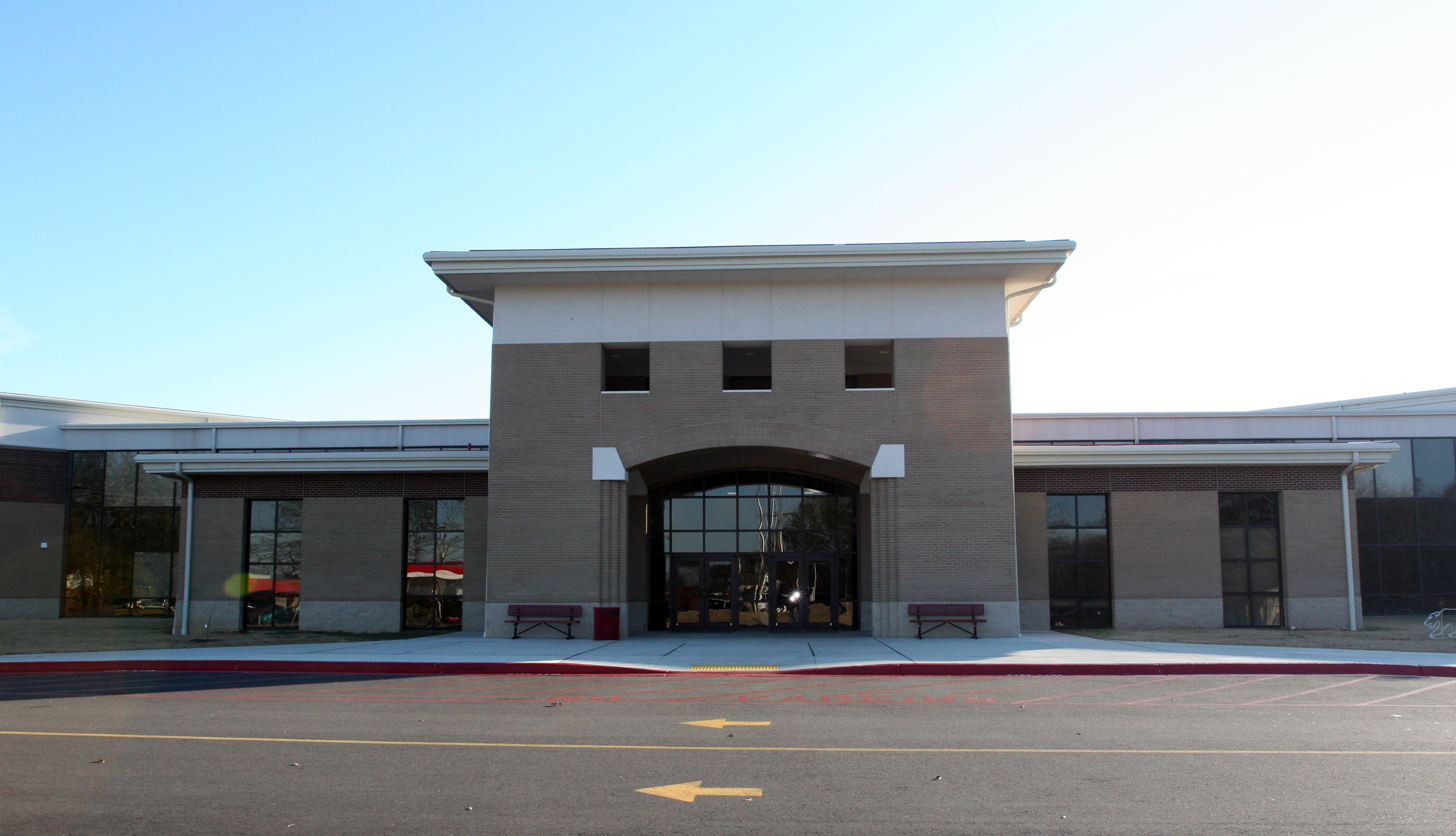
Photo of Cabot High School

=== Secondary ===
High schools

- Cabot High School (grades 10-12)
- Cabot Freshman Academy (grade 9)

Junior high schools

- Cabot Junior High, North
- Cabot Junior High, South

=== Primary ===
Middle schools

- Cabot Middle School, North
- Cabot Middle School, South

Elementary schools

- Central Elementary School
- Eastside Elementary School
- Magness Creek Elementary School
- Mountain Springs Elementary School
- Northside Elementary School
- Southside Elementary School
- Stagecoach Elementary School
- Ward Central Elementary School
- Westside Elementary School

=== Other ===
- Cabot Pre-K North
- Cabot Pre-K South
- Academic Center of Excellence (A.C.E.)
- Cabot Learning Academy.

== School board ==
The Cabot Public School Board is made up of seven members that meet every third Tuesday of the month in the CAO boardroom.

== Demographics ==
There are 10,292 students that attend the Cabot School District. 86% of the student population is white. Six percent of the students are Hispanic and three percent are black. Two percent of students are Asian. One percent of the students attending this school are English learners. 20% of students are from low income families. The male student population accounts for 52% of students and 48% of students are female. 13% of students in this school district receive special education.

== Teachers and staff ==
All teachers working full time in this district are certified. The average student to teacher ratio is 16:1. The average salary for teachers in this district is $61,816. Along with teachers this district also employs nurses, psychologists, social workers, law enforcement officers, and security guards.

== Statistics ==
The average class size in the school district is 18 students. The graduation rate in this district is 91%. In 2019 the state awarded Cabot Public Schools $6,899 per student.

== Technology ==
Throughout the Cabot School District there are 1,507 computers. They also have 1,300 iPads and 16,850 Chromebooks for students to use across the school district.

== Awards ==
In 2017 the Cabot School District received the "Be The Voice Award" from the American Foundation for Suicide Prevention. The Cabot school district is also the first school district in Arkansas to receive the Arkansas Purple Star School Award on all of their campuses.
