= George W. Granberry =

Arkansas physician and politician

George W. Granberry (born September 14, 1848 – August 9, 1927) was a newspaper publisher, physician and state legislator in Arkansas. He served in the Confederate Army and the Spanish American War.

Granberry was born September 14, 1848 in Alabama. At age twelve, the family moved to Mississippi where in 1862 he joined Second Mississippi Partisan Ranger serving during the Civil War. After the war, in 1881 he graduated from Memphis Hospital Medical College in Tennessee then set up a medical practice in Jacksonville, Arkansas.

In 1885 Granberry started The Guard newspaper in Cabot. A Democrat, he served in the Arkansas House of Representatives for two terms, from 1887 to 1890 and for two terms in the Arkansas Senate from 1895 to 1898. He served in the State Guard during Spanish American War.

Granberry died August 9, 1927.
