= Little Dixie, Arkansas =

- Unincorporated community
- Location within Arkansas Location within the United States
- Coordinates: 35°00′26″N 91°21′53″W
- Country: United States
- State: Arkansas
- Counties: Prairie, Woodruff
- Elevation: 180 ft (55 m)
- Time zone: UTC-6 (Central (CST))
  - Summer (DST): UTC-5 (CDT)
- Area code: 870
- GNIS feature ID: 58073

Little Dixie is an unincorporated community in Prairie and Woodruff counties, Arkansas, United States. It is located about 8 miles east-northeast of Des Arc, about 13 miles northwest of Brinkley, and about 19 miles south of Augusta, Arkansas. It sits at the intersection of State Highway 33 and State Highway 38.
