= Cabot High School =

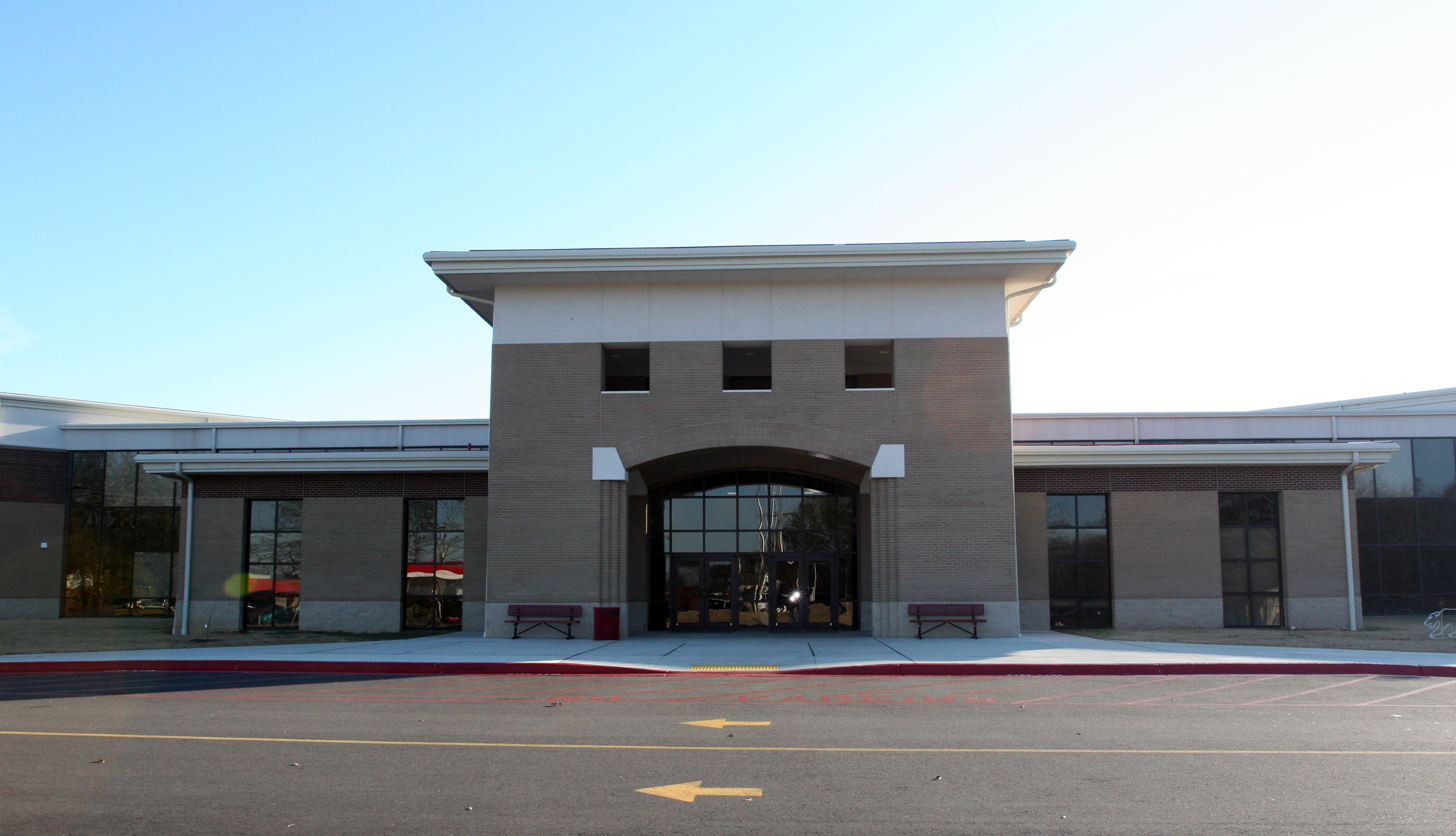
- Front entrance to CHS main building

Location
- 401 North Lincoln Street; Cabot, Arkansas 72023; United States; 34°58′24″N 92°0′31″W

Information
- Type: Public secondary
- Established: 1912 (114 years ago)
- CEEB code: 040320
- NCES School ID: 050375000123
- Principal: Mike Falcinelli
- Teaching staff: 132.89 (on FTE basis)
- Grades: 10–12
- Enrollment: 2,165 (2023-2024)
- Student to teacher ratio: 16.29
- Colors: Red, white, and black
- Fight song: On, Wisconsin!
- Mascot: Panthers
- Newspaper: The Panther Tale
- Yearbook: The Panther
- Website: www.cabotschools.org/schools/cabot-high-school

Cabot High School (CHS) is a public high school located in Cabot, Arkansas. The school serves students in grades 10 through 12 and is administered by Cabot Public Schools, which serves the city and most of northern Lonoke County. The district, and therefore the high school's boundary, includes the communities of Cabot, Austin, and Ward.

== Academics ==
The assumed course of study for students follows the Smart Core curriculum developed by the Arkansas Department of Education. Students complete regular (core and career focus) courses and exams and may select Advanced Placement (AP) coursework and exams that provide an opportunity for college credit.

Cabot High School has been designated as a School of Innovation by the Arkansas Department of Education.

== Extracurricular activities ==
The Cabot High School mascot and athletic emblem is the panther with red, white and black serving as the school colors. The school's fight song, "On, Panthers!" is based on "On, Wisconsin!".

Cabot High School's broadcasting department, in cooperation with Suddenlink Communications cable television, broadcasts Cabot High Television (CHTV) and the Cabot Schools Network (CSN) locally on channel three in the area.

The Cabot High School Quizbowl Team competes in the 7A Central conference, and has won second place at the 2017, 2014, 2008, and 2007 AGQBA state championships.

=== Athletics ===
For 2023–24, the Cabot Panthers compete in the state's largest classification—7A Classification—from the 7A/6A East Conference, as administered by the Arkansas Activities Association. The Panthers participate in football, volleyball, golf (boys/girls), bowling (boys/girls), cross country (boys/girls), basketball (boys/girls), competitive cheer, competitive dance, soccer (boys/girls), baseball, softball, wrestling, swimming & diving (boys/girls), tennis (boys/girls), track & field (boys/girls).

- Football: The Panthers won the state football championship in 1983 and 2000.
- Volleyball: The Lady Panthers volleyball teams won consecutive state volleyball championships in 1989 and 1990.
- Golf: The boys golf team are 8-time state golf champions (1997, 1998, 1999, 2000, 2001, 2003, 2009, 2010). The girls golf team are 9-time state golf champions including winning its first title in 1976 and 8 consecutive state golf titles between 1986 and 1993.
- Bowling: The girls bowling team are 4-time state bowling champions (2009, 2011, 2013, 2015).The boys bowling team are 4-time state bowling champions (2012, 2013, 2014, 2015). Both have 8 state championships and 11 conference titles
- Basketball: The Lady Panthers won their first state basketball championship in 2012. The Panthers won their first title in 2016, defeating Bentonville and Malik Monk, 59–49.
- Cheerleading: The Cheerleading Team won the Game Day Cheer State Championship in 2020. In 2022 they won the National Cheerleading Association (NCA) Coed Large Varsity Game Day National Championship.
- Dance Team: The Dance Team won the Game Day Dance State Championship in 2021 and 2022.

=== Speech and Debate ===
Cabot High School currently has two major programs within the National Speech and Debate Association, serving as Cabot Debate and Cabot Forensics. Cabot High School has ranked 1st in Arkansas as of 2021, and top 50 within the NSDA program, is considered one of the best debate teams in the state, and nationally.

=== Band program ===
The concert band competes in the Arkansas School Band and Orchestra Association (ASBOA) Region IV for solo/ensemble and concert assessments, as well as for students to qualify for the ASBOA All-State Band. The Cabot Marching Band, also known as The Spirit of Cabot, is the largest high school marching band in Arkansas, with over 250 students. The marching band competes in division 4A under the classification system established by Bands of America, and placed 5th at the 2022 Bands of America Music for All Clarksville Regional Championship. The Cabot Marching Band played in the Washington, D.C, National Independence Day Parade in 2016, 2019, and 2022.

== Notable people ==
- Ricky Hill, Arkansas state senator
- Una Roberts Lawrence, writer and editor for the Southern Baptist Convention
- Bryce Mitchell, UFC fighter
- Terri Utley, winner of Miss USA 1982
- Cody Wilson, weapons developer and founder of Defense Distributed
- Lexi Weeks, pole vaulter who qualified for the 2016 Summer Olympics
- Brian Hoang, online content creator

== See also ==
- Cabot Public Schools
- Cabot, Arkansas
