= Austin, Arkansas =

City in Arkansas, United States

- City
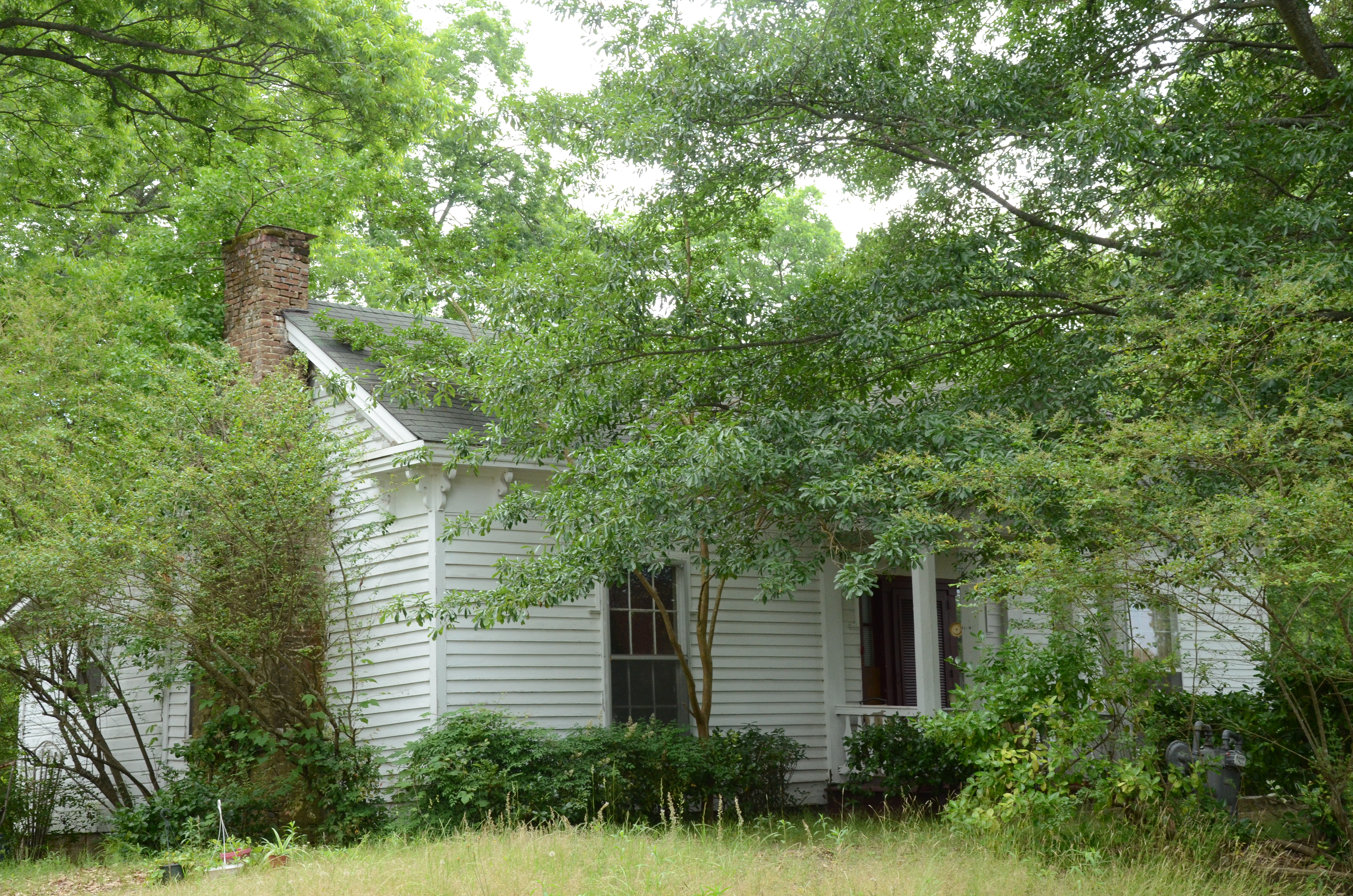
- Sears House, a historic house in the city

- Flag Seal

- Location in Lonoke County, Arkansas

- Location in Arkansas Location in the United States Location in North America
- Coordinates: 35°00′19″N 91°59′21″W
- Country: United States
- State: Arkansas
- County: Lonoke
- Founded: circa 1873
- Incorporated: 1895

Government
  - Type: Mayor–council
  - Mayor: Bernie Chamberlain

Area
  - Total: 3.10 sq mi (8.02 km^{2})
  - Land: 3.10 sq mi (8.02 km^{2})
  - Water: 0 sq mi (0.00 km^{2})
- Elevation: 243 ft (74 m)

Population (2020)
  - Total: 3,460
  - Estimate (2025): 4,017 ▲
  - Density: 1,117.6/sq mi (431.49/km^{2})
- Time zone: UTC-6 (Central (CST))
  - Summer (DST): UTC-5 (CDT)
- ZIP code: 72007
- Area code: 501
- FIPS code: 05-02860
- GNIS feature ID: 2403140
- Website: www.austin-ar.com

Austin is a city in Lonoke County, Arkansas, United States. The population was 3,460 as of the 2020 census and an estimated 4,027 as of 2024. It is part of the Little Rock–North Little Rock–Conway Metropolitan Statistical Area.

== History ==
The city was first settled c. 1872 when the St. Louis, Iron Mountain and Southern Railway built its tracks approximately one mile southeast of Old Austin. Many residents of Old Austin moved near the railroad tracks, in some cases uprooting and transporting entire buildings. The new city forming near the tracks was originally known as "Austin Station" to distinguish it from the original Austin, but eventually became known as Austin while the old community became known as "Old Austin".

Austin Academy was in Austin.

== Geography ==
Austin is located in northern Lonoke County and is bordered to the southwest by the city of Cabot and to the northeast by the city of Ward.

Interstate 57/U.S. Route 67/167, a four-lane freeway, passes through Austin, with access from Exit 22. I-57/Highway 67/167 leads southwest through Cabot 26 miles (42 km) to Little Rock, the state capital, and northeast 23 miles (37 km) to Searcy.

According to the United States Census Bureau, Austin has a total area of 2.9 square miles (7.6 km^{2}), all land.

== Demographics ==
Historical population
Census	Pop.	Note	%±
1900	196		—
1910	177		−9.7%
1920	163		−7.9%
1930	123		−24.5%
1940	145		17.9%
1950	154		6.2%
1960	210		36.4%
1970	236		12.4%
1980	269		14.0%
1990	235		−12.6%
2000	605		157.4%
2010	2,038		236.9%
2020	3,460		69.8%
2025 (est.)	4,017	▲	16.1%
U.S. Decennial Census

=== 2020 census ===
Austin racial composition
Race	Number	Percentage
White (non-Hispanic)	2,936	84.86%
Black or African American (non-Hispanic)	75	2.17%
Native American	6	0.17%
Asian	58	1.68%
Pacific Islander	3	0.09%
Other/Mixed	192	5.55%
Hispanic or Latino	190	5.49%

As of the 2020 census, Austin had a population of 3,460. The median age was 30.4 years. 32.1% of residents were under the age of 18 and 6.6% of residents were 65 years of age or older. For every 100 females there were 95.9 males, and for every 100 females age 18 and over there were 91.4 males age 18 and over.

As of the 2020 census, there were 969 families residing in the city.

98.5% of residents lived in urban areas, while 1.5% lived in rural areas.

There were 1,215 households in Austin, of which 49.5% had children under the age of 18 living in them. Of all households, 62.4% were married-couple households, 12.0% were households with a male householder and no spouse or partner present, and 17.9% were households with a female householder and no spouse or partner present. About 14.5% of all households were made up of individuals and 3.2% had someone living alone who was 65 years of age or older.

There were 1,269 housing units, of which 4.3% were vacant. The homeowner vacancy rate was 1.5% and the rental vacancy rate was 3.3%.

=== 2010 census ===
As of the census of 2010, there were 2,038 people. 218 households, and 173 families residing in the city. The population density was 202.4 inhabitants per square mile (78.1/km^{2}). There were 236 housing units at an average density of 78.9 per square mile (30.5/km^{2}). The racial makeup of the city was 96.20% White, 0.17% Black or African American, 0.17% Native American, 1.32% from other races, and 2.15% from two or more races. 5.62% of the population were Hispanic or Latino of any race.

There were 218 households, out of which 38.1% had children under the age of 18 living with them, 65.1% were married couples living together, 8.3% had a female householder with no husband present, and 20.2% were non-families. 15.1% of all households were made up of individuals, and 6.9% had someone living alone who was 65 years of age or older. The average household size was 2.78 and the average family size was 3.09.

In the city, the population was spread out, with 26.4% under the age of 18, 9.9% from 18 to 24, 32.7% from 25 to 44, 21.5% from 45 to 64, and 9.4% who were 65 years of age or older. The median age was 36 years. For every 100 females, there were 103.0 males. For every 100 females age 18 and over, there were 103.2 males.

The median income for a household in the city was $44,063, and the median income for a family was $49,107. Males had a median income of $30,069 versus $21,116 for females. The per capita income for the city was $17,369. About 3.6% of families and 6.3% of the population were below the poverty line, including 7.6% of those under age 18 and 6.8% of those age 65 or over.

== Schools ==
The city currently has no schools. It is part of Cabot Public Schools, which serves the northern part of Lonoke County including Austin. Elementary school (grades K-4) students to the north of U.S. Highway 67/167 attend Mountain Springs Elementary near northwestern Cabot, while those to the south of the freeway attend Northside Elementary in Cabot's city core. Older students attend Cabot Middle School North (grades 5-6), Cabot Junior High North (grades 7-8), Cabot Freshman Academy (grade 9), and Cabot High School (grades 10-12), all in Cabot.

== Notable people ==
Joe Farrer, physical therapist and member of the Arkansas House of Representatives
