= Hickory Plains, Arkansas =

- Unincorporated community
- Location within Arkansas Location within the United States
- Coordinates: 34°59′24″N 91°44′12″W
- Country: United States
- State: Arkansas
- County: Prairie
- Elevation: 249 ft (76 m)
- Time zone: UTC-6 (Central (CST))
  - Summer (DST): UTC-5 (CDT)
- ZIP code: 72066
- Area code: 870
- GNIS feature ID: 57915

Hickory Plains is an unincorporated community in Prairie County, Arkansas, United States. Hickory Plains is located at the junction of Arkansas highways 13 and 38, 13.5 miles (21.7 km) west of Des Arc. Hickory Plains has a post office with ZIP code 72066.
