= Cabot, Arkansas =

City in Arkansas

- City
- Flag Seal

- Location in Lonoke County, Arkansas

- Location in the United States
- Coordinates: 34°58′22″N 92°1′20″W
- Country: United States
- State: Arkansas
- County: Lonoke
- Founded: 1873
- Incorporated: 1891

Area
  - City: 20.78 sq mi (53.82 km^{2})
  - Land: 20.68 sq mi (53.57 km^{2})
  - Water: 0.097 sq mi (0.25 km^{2})
- Elevation: 299 ft (91 m)

Population (2020)
  - City: 26,569
  - Estimate (2025): 27,711 ▲
  - Density: 1,284.6/sq mi (495.99/km^{2})
  - Metro: 685,488 (Little Rock)
- Time zone: UTC-6 (CST)
  - Summer (DST): UTC-5 (CDT)
- ZIP code: 72023
- Area code: 501
- FIPS code: 05-10300
- GNIS feature ID: 2403962
- Website: www.cabotar.gov

Cabot is the largest city in Lonoke County, Arkansas, United States. As of the 2020 census, the population of the city was 26,569, and in 2024 the population was an estimated 27,575, ranking it as the state's 19th largest city, behind Jacksonville. It is part of the Little Rock-North Little Rock-Conway metropolitan area.

== History ==
=== Prior to settlement ===
Before the city of Cabot existed, an 1862 typhoid epidemic took the lives of about 1,500 Confederate soldiers previously under Allison Nelson who were camped at Camp Nelson in the hills surrounding Cabot and Austin. In 1905, 428 poorly marked graves were exhumed by a group of Confederate veterans and moved to a new site at Camp Nelson Confederate Cemetery. Marble gravestones were placed over each grave and a large marble obelisk was erected to honor the dead. In 1982, a group of volunteers from Cabot began maintaining the cemetery, which had fallen into disrepair.

=== Early history ===
The city of Cabot sprang up as a small settlement around a refueling station on the Cairo & Fulton Railroad after it bypassed Austin. The settlement first appeared in 1873 and is thought to have been named after railroad executive George Cabot Ward. The First Baptist Church was established in 1876, and the Cabot United Methodist Church in 1881. G. W. Grandberry began publication of the first newspaper in 1885, named "The Guard". Grandberry, along with James Milton Park served as the towns medical doctors. By 1889 businesses began growing alongside the railroad tracks. Businesses included six general stores, two drugstores, a hotel owned by James Charles Boyd, James Adam's livery stable, and the Neely brothers cotton gin. The Bank of Cabot (later merged into Centennial Bank) was founded in 1903. The city of Cabot was officially incorporated November 9, 1891, as the 139th city in Arkansas.

Cabot was often overshadowed in northern Lonoke County by what at the time was the much larger city of Austin (originally named Oakland). However, Cabot experienced growth during the 1950s and 1960s, due to its proximity to the Little Rock Air Force Base in nearby Jacksonville which opened in 1955, as well as due to the "white flight" occurring in response to the racial discord in Little Rock, Arkansas caused by school desegregation and its following crisis.

=== Bedroom community ===
In 1972, the Little Rock School District, slow to comply with the 1954 US Supreme Court case Brown v. Topeka Board of Education, was forcibly ordered by federal courts to immediately desegregate the school district. As a result, tensions rose and during the 1980s and 1990s Little Rock school district teachers repeatedly went on strike. A "white exodus" occurred with many residents choosing to relocate to smaller communities around Little Rock, including Cabot, Benton, Bryant, Conway, and Maumelle instead of choosing to continue supporting full integration. Over time, new arrivals to the state chose to live in these towns (now veritable suburbs) because, by some educational indicators, the school districts were more successful.

Cabot received many of the families that were relocating during that time period. As a result, a "commuter culture" developed because many residents that had children in Cabot schools made the commute to Little Rock to work daily. 40% of military personnel working at the Little Rock Air Force Base in Jacksonville live in Cabot because of the higher cost of living in Little Rock and Jacksonville. This, coupled with the perceived higher quality of life and easily accessed work opportunity, has resulted in a "boomtown." As more people moved to Cabot to join the commuter culture, the tax base grew and, as a result, the Cabot School District steadily developed into one of the top-performing districts in the state.

Currently, the Cabot School District encompasses the north end of Lonoke County. The bulk of the county's population today can be found in approximately the same area, containing the county's most populous and second most populous cities — Cabot and Ward, respectively — in addition to Austin, which are among Arkansas' fastest growing communities.

=== Recent history ===
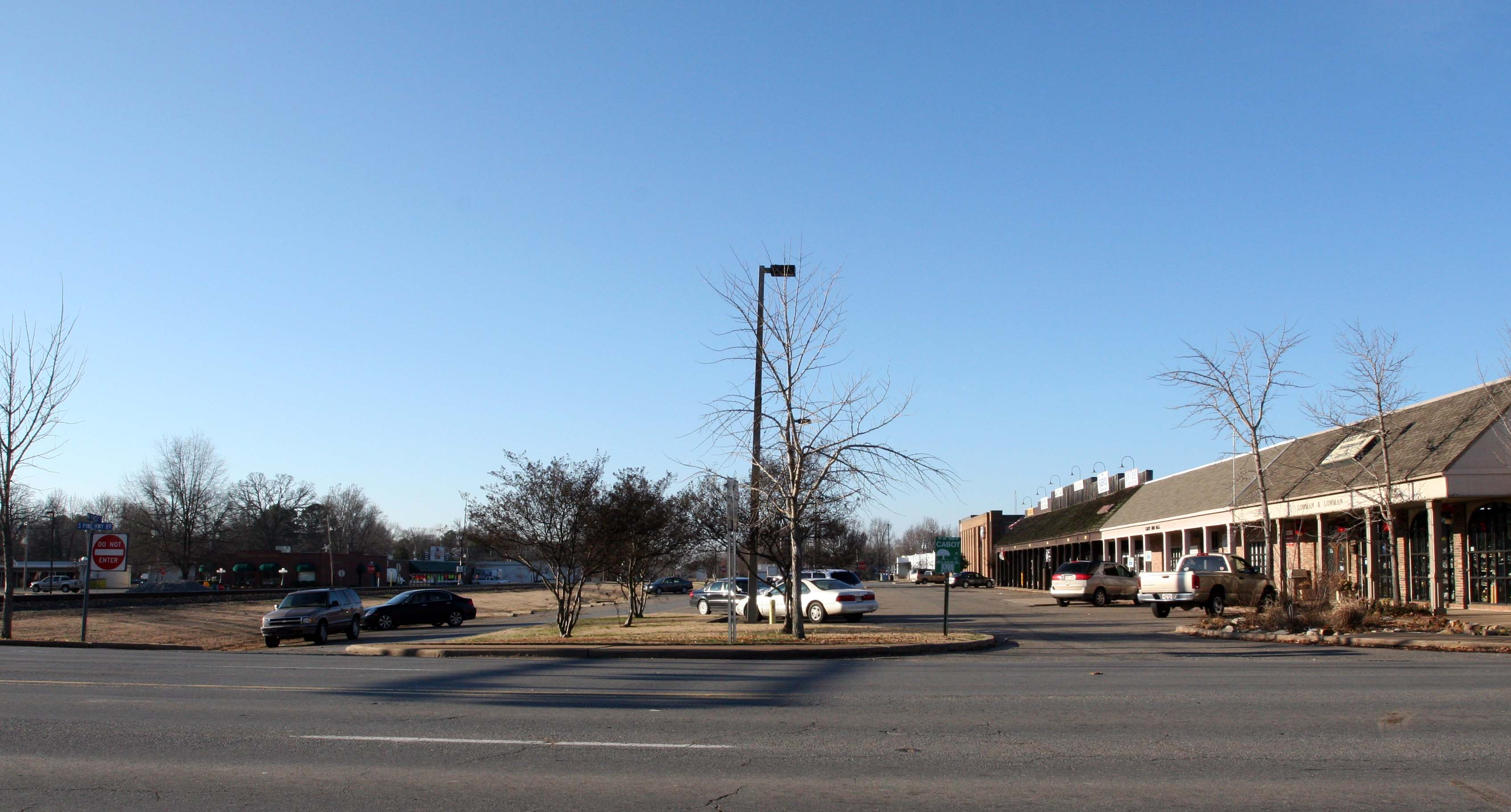
Southward view of the Cabot Mini-Mall along First Street in downtown Cabot in December 2006

A devastating tornado hit downtown Cabot during the afternoon of March 29, 1976, killing five people and destroying multiple buildings. During the rebuilding of the city, it was decided to build a new city hall, municipal courtroom, library (since relocated), and police station on the site of the debris-filled dividing point between the east and west sections of Main Street, creating City Plaza. Arkansas Highway 89, which follows the same path as West Main Street in Cabot, was redirected around City Plaza along one block of Second Street, to continue its path along Pine Street just south of the Cabot High School campus.

Cabot's population has more than quintupled from the 1980s to today, from under 5,000 residents to over 26,000. New housing starts, as seen by new subdivided developments, now cover the town.

On August 10, 2006, Cabot Junior High School North experienced a devastating fire which was believed to have started as a small electrical fire in the library caused by a faulty light bulb. Although there were 100 people in the building at the time, there were no injuries. The building burned from 2:30 p.m. to about 9:00 p.m., and the structure was a total loss. Cabot Fire and Police Departments say that this is one of the worst structure fires to have ever occurred in Cabot. The school was only about eight years old. It was rebuilt and reopened about three years later.

== Geography ==
Cabot is in northwestern Lonoke County and is bordered to the northeast by the city of Austin. Interstate 57/U.S. Routes 67 and 167 pass through the northwest side of the city on a four-lane freeway, leading northeast 26 miles (42 km) to Searcy and southwest 22 miles (35 km) to Little Rock, the state capital. Jacksonville is 9 miles (14 km) southwest of Cabot via I-57/Highways 67 and 167.

According to the United States Census Bureau, Cabot has a total area of 20.6 square miles (53.3 km^{2}), of which 20.5 square miles (53.1 km^{2}) are land and 0.1 square miles (0.2 km^{2}), or 0.44%, are water.

=== Climate ===
The climate in this area is characterized by hot, humid summers and generally mild to cool winters. According to the Köppen Climate Classification system, Cabot has a humid subtropical climate, abbreviated "Cfa" on climate maps.

Climate data for Cabot, Arkansas, 1991–2020 normals, extremes 1965–present
Month	Jan	Feb	Mar	Apr	May	Jun	Jul	Aug	Sep	Oct	Nov	Dec	Year
Record high °F (°C)	80 (27)	83 (28)	91 (33)	94 (34)	98 (37)	106 (41)	112 (44)	110 (43)	106 (41)	96 (36)	87 (31)	80 (27)	112 (44)
Mean maximum °F (°C)	70.0 (21.1)	73.8 (23.2)	81.1 (27.3)	84.5 (29.2)	89.3 (31.8)	94.6 (34.8)	98.8 (37.1)	99.2 (37.3)	94.9 (34.9)	87.2 (30.7)	79.0 (26.1)	70.5 (21.4)	101.0 (38.3)
Mean daily maximum °F (°C)	51.2 (10.7)	55.7 (13.2)	64.5 (18.1)	73.3 (22.9)	80.8 (27.1)	88.5 (31.4)	92.4 (33.6)	91.9 (33.3)	86.4 (30.2)	75.8 (24.3)	63.5 (17.5)	53.7 (12.1)	73.1 (22.9)
Daily mean °F (°C)	39.6 (4.2)	43.3 (6.3)	51.7 (10.9)	60.2 (15.7)	69.2 (20.7)	77.3 (25.2)	80.8 (27.1)	79.9 (26.6)	73.6 (23.1)	61.8 (16.6)	50.5 (10.3)	42.3 (5.7)	60.9 (16.0)
Mean daily minimum °F (°C)	27.9 (−2.3)	30.9 (−0.6)	39.0 (3.9)	47.1 (8.4)	57.5 (14.2)	66.1 (18.9)	69.2 (20.7)	67.9 (19.9)	60.7 (15.9)	47.9 (8.8)	37.5 (3.1)	30.9 (−0.6)	48.6 (9.2)
Mean minimum °F (°C)	13.2 (−10.4)	17.5 (−8.1)	22.9 (−5.1)	32.7 (0.4)	42.4 (5.8)	55.6 (13.1)	61.5 (16.4)	59.5 (15.3)	46.1 (7.8)	31.7 (−0.2)	22.0 (−5.6)	16.5 (−8.6)	10.3 (−12.1)
Record low °F (°C)	−5 (−21)	−3 (−19)	11 (−12)	24 (−4)	35 (2)	46 (8)	51 (11)	49 (9)	35 (2)	24 (−4)	11 (−12)	−7 (−22)	−7 (−22)
Average precipitation inches (mm)	3.55 (90)	4.42 (112)	5.20 (132)	5.25 (133)	6.11 (155)	3.64 (92)	3.26 (83)	3.82 (97)	3.67 (93)	4.17 (106)	5.19 (132)	5.05 (128)	53.33 (1,353)
Average snowfall inches (cm)	0.7 (1.8)	0.9 (2.3)	0.4 (1.0)	0.0 (0.0)	0.0 (0.0)	0.0 (0.0)	0.0 (0.0)	0.0 (0.0)	0.0 (0.0)	0.0 (0.0)	0.0 (0.0)	0.1 (0.25)	2.1 (5.35)
Average precipitation days (≥ 0.01 in)	7.4	7.6	8.8	9.1	9.8	7.1	7.4	6.8	5.5	6.9	7.8	8.0	92.2
Average snowy days (≥ 0.1 in)	0.4	0.5	0.3	0.0	0.0	0.0	0.0	0.0	0.0	0.0	0.1	0.1	1.4
Source 1: NOAA
Source 2: National Weather Service

== Demographics ==
Historical population
Census	Pop.	Note	%±
1880	154		—
1900	294		—
1910	441		50.0%
1920	447		1.4%
1930	684		53.0%
1940	741		8.3%
1950	1,147		54.8%
1960	1,321		15.2%
1970	2,903		119.8%
1980	4,806		65.6%
1990	8,319		73.1%
2000	15,261		83.4%
2010	23,776		55.8%
2020	26,569		11.7%
2025 (est.)	27,711	▲	4.3%
U.S. Decennial Census

=== 2020 census ===
As of the 2020 census, Cabot had a population of 26,569 and contained 9,970 households, of which 6,967 were families.

The median age was 35.4 years. 27.3% of residents were under the age of 18 and 13.2% of residents were 65 years of age or older. For every 100 females there were 92.5 males, and for every 100 females age 18 and over there were 87.4 males age 18 and over.

95.4% of residents lived in urban areas, while 4.6% lived in rural areas.

Of the 9,970 households, 39.4% had children under the age of 18 living in them. Of all households, 53.0% were married-couple households, 14.7% were households with a male householder and no spouse or partner present, and 26.5% were households with a female householder and no spouse or partner present. About 23.6% of all households were made up of individuals and 9.4% had someone living alone who was 65 years of age or older.

There were 10,637 housing units, of which 6.3% were vacant. The homeowner vacancy rate was 2.0% and the rental vacancy rate was 7.6%.

Racial composition as of the 2020 census
Race	Number	Percent
White	22,427	84.4%
Black or African American	780	2.9%
American Indian and Alaska Native	157	0.6%
Asian	452	1.7%
Native Hawaiian and Other Pacific Islander	27	0.1%
Some other race	504	1.9%
Two or more races	2,222	8.4%
Hispanic or Latino (of any race)	1,568	5.9%

=== 2010 census ===
As of the census of 2010, there were 23,776 people, 5,432 households, and 4,329 families residing in the city. The population density was 798.2 inhabitants per square mile (308.2/km^{2}). There were 5,712 housing units at an average density of 298.8 units per square mile (115.4 units/km^{2}). The racial makeup of the city was 96.56% White, 0.33% Black or African American, 0.40% Native American, 0.88% Asian, 0.04% Pacific Islander, 0.49% from other races, and 1.30% from two or more races. 1.87% of the population were Hispanic or Latino of any race.

There were 5,432 households, out of which 47.1% had children under the age of 18 living with them, 65.7% were married couples living together, 10.7% had a female householder with no husband present, and 20.3% were non-families. 17.2% of all households were made up of individuals, and 5.8% had someone living alone who was 65 years of age or older. The average household size was 2.78 and the average family size was 3.14.

In the city, the population was spread out, with 31.5% under the age of 18, 7.6% from 18 to 24, 34.0% from 25 to 44, 19.0% from 45 to 64, and 7.9% who were 65 years of age or older. The median age was 32 years. For every 100 females, there were 95.8 males. For every 100 females age 18 and over, there were 89.9 males.

The median income for a household in the city was $49,389, and the median income for a family was $53,933. Males had a median income of $37,450 versus $26,209 for females. The per capita income for the city was $19,020. About 5.6% of families and 7.1% of the population were below the poverty line, including 7.9% of those under age 18 and 10.4% of those age 65 or over.

== Arts and culture ==
Cabot has a movie theater that was built in the late 1990s, plus a growing number of restaurants, amateur sporting venues and community organizations. A new multimillion-dollar library/public meeting complex was completed and opened in 2015. The city has golf courses adjoining Greystone Country Club in the city's north end, and near Rolling Hills Country Club in southeast Cabot. Both of the country clubs and the Veterans of Foreign Wars post are exceptions to Cabot's legal status as part of a dry county, which prohibits the sale of alcoholic beverages elsewhere in the city.

One of the city's biggest events, staged in the downtown area each October, is Cabotfest — a community fair that has grown in popularity as the city's population has swelled over the years since the tornado. A similar event called Strawberry Fest is held annually in the spring. Cabot is part of the small area in Arkansas along highway 67/167 where strawberries were grown in abundance and sold in other parts of the country during the early part of the 20th Century due in large part to the arrival of the railroad.

Adam Richman, the host of Man vs. Food on the Travel Channel, came to Cabot's Mean Pig BBQ during the Season 2 "Little Rock" episode which aired on November 25, 2009, to try the Shut-Up Juice Challenge, which involves a large smoked pulled pork sandwich topped with coleslaw and "Shut-Up Juice" - barbecue sauce mixed with a tablespoon of concentrated, undiluted habanero extract.

There are 43 churches in Cabot. This gives the city a person-to-church ratio of 618 people per church.

== Education ==
Cabot Public Schools serves students in the communities of Cabot, Austin, and Ward, as well as most of northern Lonoke County. The Cabot Public School District has been designated as a Purple Star School District for its support of military families, particularly those serving at the Little Rock Air Force Base.

== Highways and transportation ==
Major transportation routes near/through Cabot are the railroad (currently owned by Union Pacific), the "old highway to St. Louis" (currently Arkansas Highway 367), and Interstate 57/US Highway 67/167. Historically, Cabot lay on the Memphis to Fort Smith spur of the Butterfield Overland Stagecoach Route.

== Notable people ==
- Roark Bradford, short story writer and novelist
- George W. Granberry (1848 – 1912), physician, newspaper editor and politician
- Bryce Mitchell, UFC fighter
- Terri Utley, Miss Arkansas USA 1982, Miss USA 1982
- Eddie Joe Williams, current member of the Southern States Energy Board, former mayor of Cabot, former state senator for District 29 and Senate Majority Leader
- Cody Wilson, crypto-anarchist, founder of Defense Distributed, inventor of an early model 3D-printable gun.
