= England, Arkansas =

- City
- Location of England in Lonoke County, Arkansas.

- Location in the contiguous United States
- Coordinates: 34°32′39″N 91°58′3″W
- Country: United States
- State: Arkansas
- County: Lonoke

Area
  - Total: 1.89 sq mi (4.89 km^{2})
  - Land: 1.89 sq mi (4.89 km^{2})
  - Water: 0 sq mi (0.00 km^{2})
- Elevation: 230 ft (70 m)

Population (2020)
  - Total: 2,477
  - Estimate (2025): 2,407 ▼
  - Density: 1,311.2/sq mi (506.26/km^{2})
- Time zone: UTC-6 (Central (CST))
  - Summer (DST): UTC-5 (CDT)
- ZIP code: 72046
- Area code: 501
- FIPS code: 05-21730
- GNIS feature ID: 2403566
- Website: cityofengland.com

England is a city in southwestern Lonoke County, Arkansas, United States, and is the county's fourth most populous city. As of the 2020 census, England had a population of 2,477. It is part of the Little Rock–North Little Rock–Conway Metropolitan Statistical Area.

== Geography ==
According to the United States Census Bureau, the city has a total area of 1.9 square miles (4.8 km^{2}), all land.

== Demographics ==
Historical population
Census	Pop.	Note	%±
1900	368		—
1910	1,407		282.3%
1920	2,408		71.1%
1930	2,130		−11.5%
1940	2,027		−4.8%
1950	2,136		5.4%
1960	2,861		33.9%
1970	3,075		7.5%
1980	3,081		0.2%
1990	3,351		8.8%
2000	2,972		−11.3%
2010	2,825		−4.9%
2020	2,477		−12.3%
2025 (est.)	2,407	▼	−2.8%
U.S. Decennial Census; 2015 Estimate

=== 2020 census ===
As of the 2020 census, England had a population of 2,477, with 1,061 households and 667 families residing in the city. The median age was 40.8 years; 22.7% of residents were under age 18 and 19.8% were age 65 or older. For every 100 females, there were 86.7 males, and for every 100 females age 18 and over, there were 83.9 males.

0.0% of residents lived in urban areas, while 100.0% lived in rural areas.

Of the 1,061 households, 29.5% had children under age 18 living in them. Of all households, 38.3% were married-couple households, 21.6% were households with a male householder and no spouse or partner present, and 36.0% were households with a female householder and no spouse or partner present. About 34.5% of all households were made up of individuals, and 14.9% had someone living alone who was age 65 or older.

There were 1,233 housing units, of which 13.9% were vacant. The homeowner vacancy rate was 1.8%, and the rental vacancy rate was 7.2%.

England racial composition
Race	Number	Percentage
White (non-Hispanic)	1,473	59.47%
Black or African American (non-Hispanic)	831	33.55%
Native American	3	0.12%
Asian	3	0.12%
Other/Mixed	91	3.67%
Hispanic or Latino	76	3.07%

=== 2000 census ===
At the 2000 census there were 2,972 people in 1,183 households, including 830 families, in the city. The population density was 1,597.1 inhabitants per square mile (616.6/km^{2}). There were 1,305 housing units at an average density of 701.3 per square mile (270.8/km^{2}). The racial makeup of the city was 65.51% White, 33.18% Black or African American, 0.37% Native American, 0.10% Asian, 0.10% from other races, and 0.74% from two or more races. 0.84% of the population were Hispanic or Latino of any race. Of the 1,183 households 32.6% had children under the age of 18 living with them, 46.7% were married couples living together, 19.8% had a female householder with no husband present, and 29.8% were non-families. 26.7% of households were one person and 13.7% were one person aged 65 or older. The average household size was 2.51 and the average family size was 3.03.

The age distribution was 27.1% under the age of 18, 9.3% from 18 to 24, 26.6% from 25 to 44, 20.8% from 45 to 64, and 16.2% 65 or older. The median age was 36 years. For every 100 females, there were 83.9 males. For every 100 females age 18 and over, there were 78.7 males.

The median household income was $28,516 and the median family income was $34,335. Males had a median income of $26,449 versus $18,500 for females. The per capita income for the city was $14,095. About 14.7% of families and 17.9% of the population were below the poverty line, including 21.9% of those under age 18 and 21.8% of those age 65 or over.

== Economy ==
The Arkansas Department of Correction operates the Willis H. Sargent Training Academy in England.

== Sports ==
England is home of the England High School Lions.

== Education ==
The England Public School District is headquartered in and serves England, with students graduating from England High School.

== Notable people ==
- Charles Capps, Pentecostal minister and televangelist
- Nat Clifton, NBA player
- Country music artists Arlene, Bobby and Robbie Harden, known collectively as The Harden Trio
