= Lonoke County, Arkansas =

County in Arkansas, United States

- County
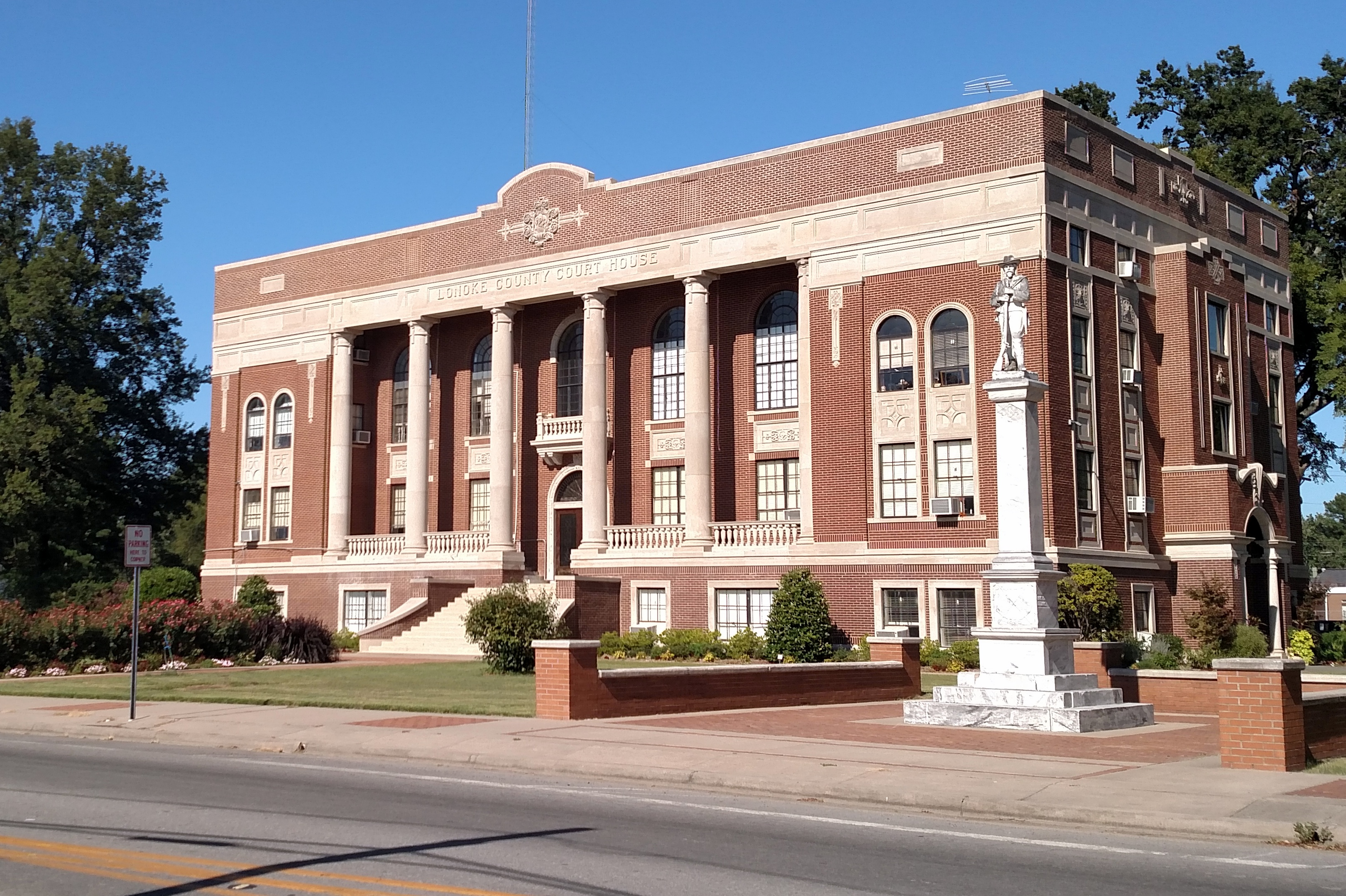
- Lonoke County Courthouse

- Location within the U.S. state of Arkansas
- Country: United States
- State: Arkansas
- Formed: April 16, 1874 (152 years ago)
- Named for: "Lone oak"
- Seat: Lonoke
- Largest city: Cabot

Area
  - Total: 803 sq mi (2,080 km^{2})
  - Land: 771 sq mi (2,000 km^{2})
  - Water: 32 sq mi (83 km^{2}) 4.0%

Population (2020)
  - Total: 74,015
  - Estimate (2025): 76,664 ▲
  - Density: 96.0/sq mi (37.1/km^{2})
- Time zone: UTC−6 (Central)
  - Summer (DST): UTC−5 (CDT)
- ZIP Codes: 72007, 72023, 72024, 72037, 72046, 72072, 72076, 72083, 72086, 72142, 72160, 72176
- Congressional district: 1st

Lonoke County is a county located in the Central Arkansas region of the U.S. state of Arkansas. As of the 2020 census, the population was 74,015, making it the 10th-most populous of Arkansas's 75 counties. The county seat is Lonoke and largest city is Cabot. Included in the Central Arkansas metropolitan area, with Little Rock as the principal city, it is an alcohol prohibition or dry county.

== Etymology ==
Lonoke County was named for the "lone oak" located in the county at the time of its formation, by simply spelling it phonetically, at the suggestion of the chief engineer of the Cairo & Fulton Railroad.

== History ==
Formed on April 16, 1873, from Pulaski and Prairie counties, Lonoke County's varied geography can be roughly broken into thirds horizontally. The top third has rolling hills at the edge of the Ozarks, including the Cabot area. The middle third, including the Lonoke area, contains portions of the Grand Prairie, a flat native grassland today known for rice farming, an important part of the culture, economy and history of Lonoke County. The southern third, including the Scott area, is home to the alluvial soils of the Arkansas Delta. Historically, a military road and a railroad brought settlers to the area, and cotton cultivation was very profitable. In 1904, a demonstration that rice could grow well on the same land coupled with sinking cotton prices drove the area into rice cultivation. During World Wars I and II, Lonoke County was home to Eberts Field, a U.S. Army airfield. Today the land is used in aquaculture.

== Geography ==
According to the U.S. Census Bureau, the county has a total area of 803 square miles (2,080 km^{2}), of which 771 square miles (2,000 km^{2}) is land and 32 square miles (83 km^{2}) (4.0%) is water.

=== Hydrology ===
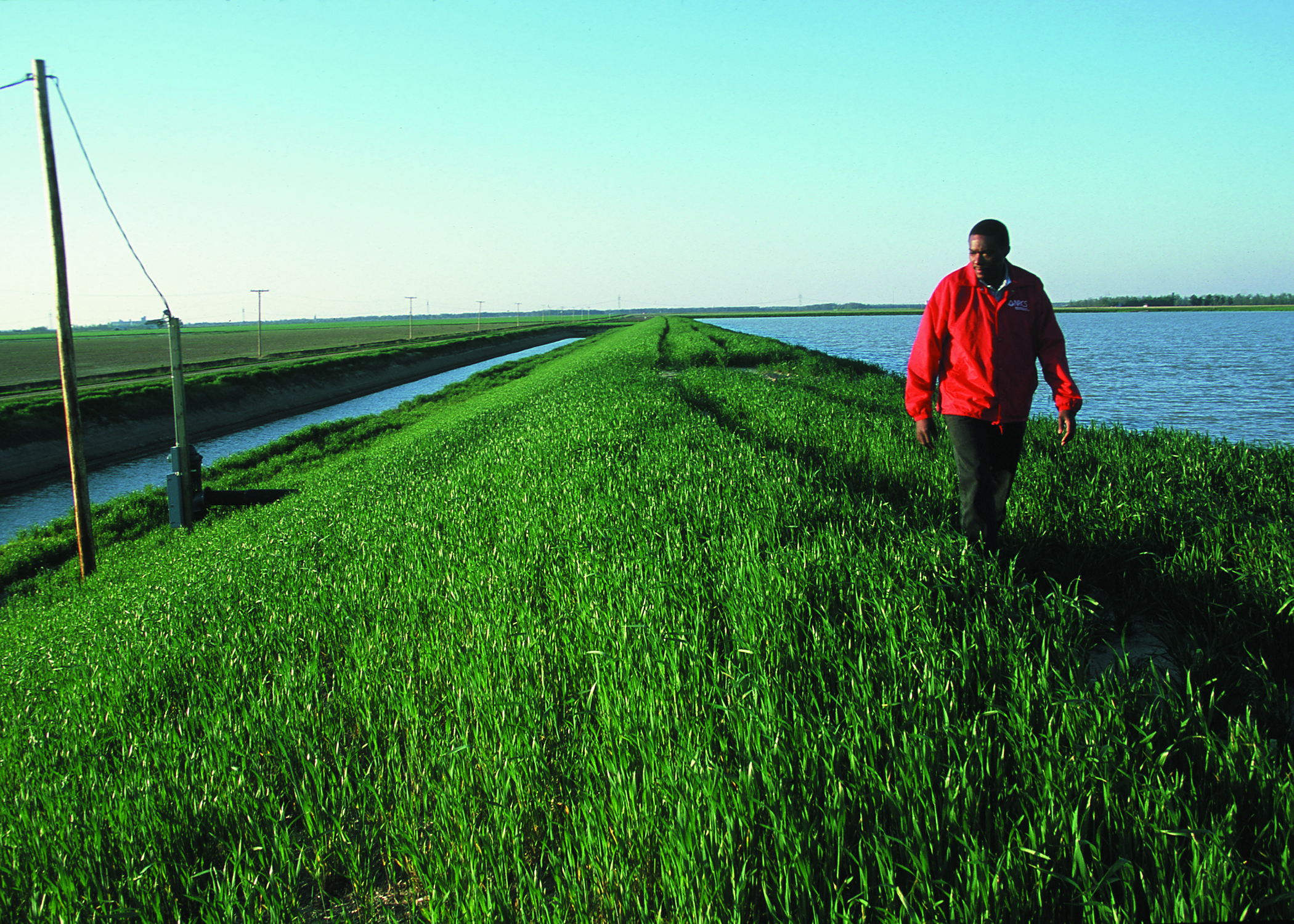
Much of the flat landscape of Lonoke County is drained by manmade ditches or canals (left), which convey water to/from storage ponds (right) until it is used irrigate row crops, or for aquaculture

Sitting within the Grand Prairie, Lonoke County is a largely level county with relatively impermeable clay soils, making it an important headwater for many tributary streams. Cypress Bayou forms the northern boundary of the county, with tributaries Pigeon Roost Creek, Brush Creek, and Mill Creek having headwaters in northern Lonoke County, and Fourmile Creek, which originates in Pulaski County. Two watercourses drain much of central of Lonoke County: Wattensaw Bayou, a tributary of the Cache River, has headwaters in Cabot, and Bayou Two Prairie, which originates in Pulaski County and runs across Lonoke County, briefly forming the eastern county boundary until emptying into Bayou Meto. Bayou Meto forms the southeastern boundary with Prairie County and is the receiving waters for Crooked Creek and is bisected by Big Ditch, a manmade canal famous for the numerous duck hunting camps serving this part of the Mississippi flyway. Southwestern Lonoke County is drained by Wabbaseka Bayou and tributaries Bakers Bayou, Salt Bayou, and Plum Bayou.

=== Major highways ===
- Interstate 40
- Interstate 57 / U.S. Highway 67 / U.S. Highway 167
- U.S. Highway 70
- U.S. Highway 165
- Highway 5
- Highway 13
- Highway 15
- Highway 31
- Highway 38
- Highway 89
- Highway 161
- Highway 232
- Highway 236
- Highway 256
- Highway 294
- Highway 319
- Highway 321
- Highway 367
- Highway 381
- Highway 386

=== Adjacent counties ===
- White County (north)
- Prairie County (east)
- Arkansas County (southeast)
- Jefferson County (south)
- Pulaski County (west)
- Faulkner County (northwest)

== Demographics ==
Historical population
Census	Pop.	Note	%±
1880	12,146		—
1890	19,263		58.6%
1900	22,544		17.0%
1910	27,983		24.1%
1920	33,400		19.4%
1930	33,759		1.1%
1940	29,802		−11.7%
1950	27,278		−8.5%
1960	24,551		−10.0%
1970	26,249		6.9%
1980	34,518		31.5%
1990	39,268		13.8%
2000	52,828		34.5%
2010	68,356		29.4%
2020	74,015		8.3%
2025 (est.)	76,664	▲	3.6%
U.S. Decennial Census; 1790–1960 1900–1990; 1990–2000 2010

=== 2020 census ===
As of the 2020 census, the county had a population of 74,015. The median age was 37.4 years. 25.8% of residents were under the age of 18 and 14.7% of residents were 65 years of age or older. For every 100 females there were 96.5 males, and for every 100 females age 18 and over there were 93.2 males age 18 and over.

The racial makeup of the county was 83.3% White, 5.9% Black or African American, 0.5% American Indian and Alaska Native, 1.0% Asian, 0.1% Native Hawaiian and Pacific Islander, 2.0% from some other race, and 7.3% from two or more races. Hispanic or Latino residents of any race comprised 4.9% of the population.

48.1% of residents lived in urban areas, while 51.9% lived in rural areas.

There were 27,841 households in the county, of which 36.7% had children under the age of 18 living in them. Of all households, 54.3% were married-couple households, 16.0% were households with a male householder and no spouse or partner present, and 24.1% were households with a female householder and no spouse or partner present. About 22.9% of all households were made up of individuals and 9.3% had someone living alone who was 65 years of age or older.

There were 30,112 housing units, of which 7.5% were vacant. Among occupied housing units, 71.8% were owner-occupied and 28.2% were renter-occupied. The homeowner vacancy rate was 1.9% and the rental vacancy rate was 7.5%.

=== 2000 census ===
As of the 2000 census, there were 52,828 people, 19,262 households, and 15,024 families residing in the county. The population density was 69 inhabitants per square mile (27/km^{2}). There were 20,749 housing units at an average density of 27 per square mile (10/km^{2}). The racial makeup of the county was 91.03% White, 6.44% Black or African American, 0.49% Native American, 0.42% Asian, 0.03% Pacific Islander, 0.51% from other races, and 1.08% from two or more races. 1.75% of the population were Hispanic or Latino of any race.

There were 19,262 households, out of which 40.30% had children under the age of 18 living with them, 63.30% were married couples living together, 10.60% had a female householder with no husband present, and 22.00% were non-families. 19.00% of all households were made up of individuals, and 7.60% had someone living alone who was 65 years of age or older. The average household size was 2.71 and the average family size was 3.09.

In the county, the population was spread out, with 28.70% under the age of 18, 8.00% from 18 to 24, 30.90% from 25 to 44, 21.90% from 45 to 64, and 10.40% who were 65 years of age or older. The median age was 35 years. For every 100 females, there were 96.80 males. For every 100 females age 18 and over, there were 93.50 males.

The median income for a household in the county was $40,314, and the median income for a family was $46,173. Males had a median income of $32,451 versus $22,897 for females. The per capita income for the county was $17,397. About 8.10% of families and 10.50% of the population were below the poverty line, including 12.20% of those under age 18 and 13.60% of those age 65 or over.

== Government and infrastructure ==
=== Government ===
The county government is a constitutional body granted specific powers by the Constitution of Arkansas and the Arkansas Code. The quorum court is the legislative branch of the county government and controls all spending and revenue collection. Representatives are called justices of the peace and are elected from county districts every even-numbered year. The number of districts in a county vary from nine to fifteen, and district boundaries are drawn by the county election commission. The Lonoke County Quorum Court has thirteen members. Presiding over quorum court meetings is the county judge, who serves as the chief executive officer of the county. The county judge is elected at-large and does not vote in quorum court business, although capable of vetoing quorum court decisions.

Lonoke County, Arkansas Elected countywide officials
Position	Officeholder	Party
County Judge	Doug Erwin	Republican
County Clerk	Dawn Porterfield	Republican
Circuit Clerk	Deborah Oglesby	Republican
Sheriff	John Staley	Republican
Treasurer	Patti Weathers	Republican
Collector	William Ryker	Democrat
Assessor	Donna Pederson	Republican
Coroner	Carla Horton	Republican

The composition of the Quorum Court after the 2024 elections is 12 Republicans and 1 Democrat. Justices of the Peace (members) of the Quorum Court following the elections are:

- District 1: Brent Canon (R)
- District 2: Henry L. Hawkins (R)
- District 3: Henry L. Lang (R)
- District 4: Claud E. Irvin (R)
- District 5: Robert "Bobby" Gilliam (R)
- District 6: Mickey D. Stumbaugh (R)
- District 7: Adam Sims (R)
- District 8: Tate House (R)
- District 9: Linda Waddell (R)
- District 10: Dr. Rose Marie Bryant-Jones (R)
- District 11: Mike Dolan (D)
- District 12: Patricia A. Knox (R)
- District 13: Bob Morris (R)

Additionally, the townships of Lonoke County are entitled to elect their own respective constables, as set forth by the Constitution of Arkansas. Constables are largely of historical significance as they were used to keep the peace in rural areas when travel was more difficult.

The township constables as of the 2024 elections are:

- Butler: William Langley (R)
- Carlisle: Ronnie Thrift (R)
- Caroline: Carl Gutske (R)
- Crooked Creek: Josh Cheek (R)
- Eagle: Kyle Matthews (R)
- Furlow: Steve Finch (R)
- Goodrum: Jerry Howard (R)
- Gray: Tony Southerland (R)
- Gumwoods: Adam Ryan (R)
- Lafayette: Tim Collins (R)
- Magness: Nathanael D. House (R)
- Oak Grove: Vincent F. Scarlata (R)
- Prairie: Mike Verkler (R)
- Ward: Austin Lane Everett (R)
- Williams: Mark W. Moore (R)
- York: James M. Hall (R)

=== Infrastructure ===
Lonoke County is home to Camp Nelson Confederate Cemetery, Plantation Agriculture Museum, and Plum Bayou Mounds Archeological State Park.

=== Politics ===
Over the past few election cycles, Lonoke County has trended heavily towards the Republican party. The last Democrat (as of 2024) to carry the county was Bill Clinton in 1996.

United States presidential election results for Lonoke County, Arkansas
Year	Republican		Democratic		Third party(ies)	
Year	No.	%	No.	%	No.	%
1896	437	15.82%	2,300	83.27%	25	0.91%
1900	679	33.15%	1,337	65.28%	32	1.56%
1904	775	39.22%	1,178	59.62%	23	1.16%
1908	592	28.78%	1,385	67.33%	80	3.89%
1912	254	13.52%	1,129	60.09%	496	26.40%
1916	515	19.11%	2,180	80.89%	0	0.00%
1920	697	28.09%	1,711	68.96%	73	2.94%
1924	321	23.87%	962	71.52%	62	4.61%
1928	676	26.66%	1,857	73.23%	3	0.12%
1932	175	5.58%	2,951	94.04%	12	0.38%
1936	310	10.17%	2,735	89.76%	2	0.07%
1940	323	14.52%	1,899	85.35%	3	0.13%
1944	697	25.23%	2,064	74.70%	2	0.07%
1948	383	12.81%	2,065	69.04%	543	18.15%
1952	1,570	30.82%	3,517	69.04%	7	0.14%
1956	1,932	36.21%	3,234	60.61%	170	3.19%
1960	1,560	29.17%	2,991	55.93%	797	14.90%
1964	3,636	48.63%	3,818	51.06%	23	0.31%
1968	1,677	21.80%	2,014	26.18%	4,002	52.02%
1972	5,298	67.62%	2,504	31.96%	33	0.42%
1976	2,522	24.49%	7,761	75.36%	16	0.16%
1980	5,619	48.50%	5,605	48.38%	361	3.12%
1984	8,425	64.11%	4,636	35.28%	81	0.62%
1988	7,215	59.68%	4,786	39.59%	89	0.74%
1992	6,253	39.52%	7,963	50.32%	1,608	10.16%
1996	6,414	39.95%	8,049	50.13%	1,593	9.92%
2000	10,606	59.11%	6,851	38.18%	486	2.71%
2004	14,398	65.36%	7,454	33.84%	178	0.81%
2008	17,242	72.63%	5,968	25.14%	531	2.24%
2012	17,880	74.15%	5,625	23.33%	609	2.53%
2016	19,958	73.65%	5,664	20.90%	1,478	5.45%
2020	22,884	74.63%	6,686	21.81%	1,092	3.56%
2024	23,225	75.85%	6,790	22.18%	605	1.98%

== Communities ==
=== Cities ===
- Austin
- Cabot
- Carlisle
- England
- Humnoke
- Lonoke (county seat)
- Ward

=== Towns ===
- Allport
- Coy
- Keo

=== Census-designated place ===
- Scott

=== Townships ===
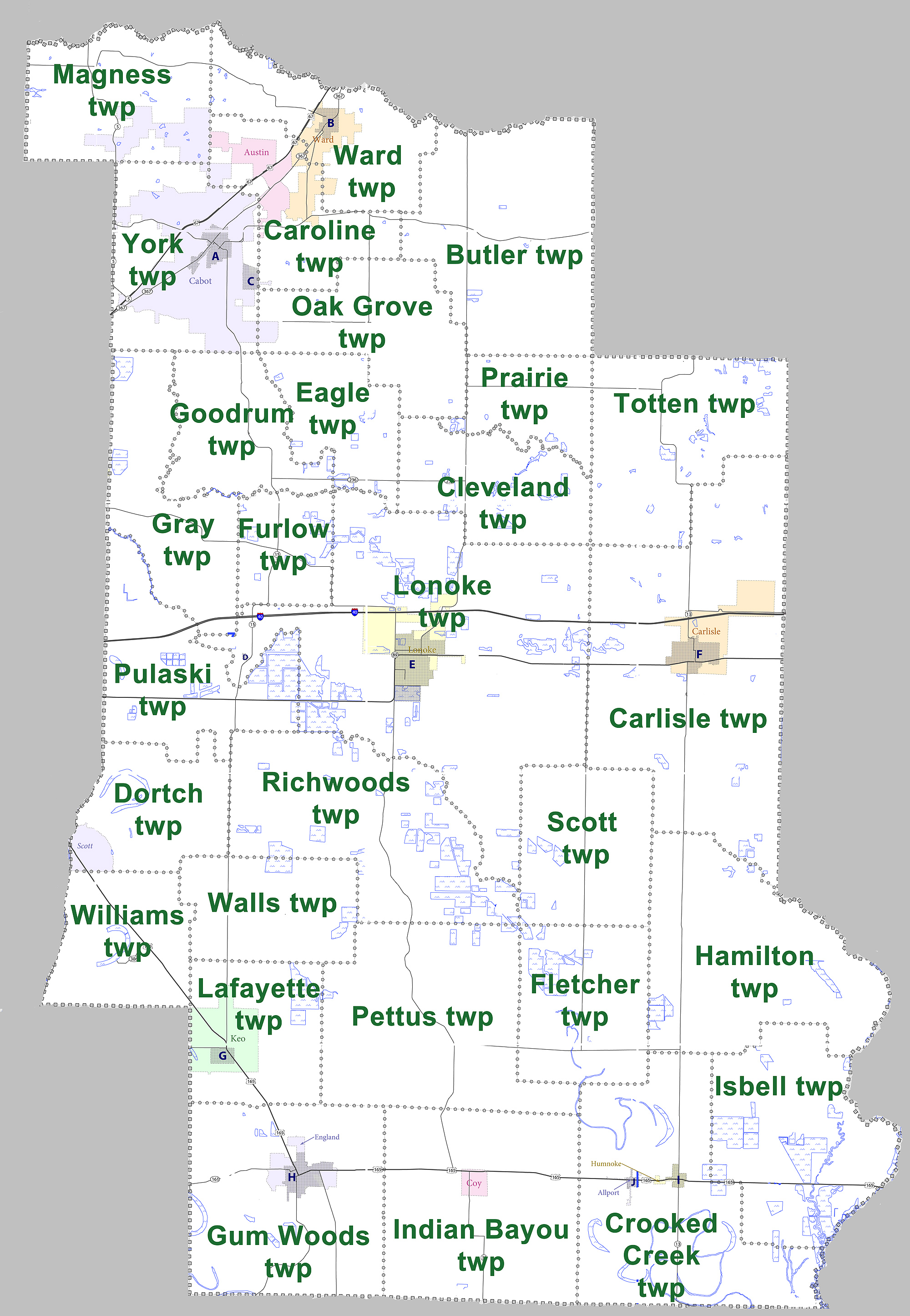
Townships in Lonoke County, Arkansas as of 2010

Townships in Arkansas are the divisions of a county. Each township includes unincorporated areas; some may have incorporated cities or towns within part of their boundaries. Arkansas townships have limited purposes in modern times. However, the United States census does list Arkansas population based on townships (sometimes referred to as "county subdivisions" or "minor civil divisions"). Townships are also of value for historical purposes in terms of genealogical research. Each town or city is within one or more townships in an Arkansas county based on census maps and publications. The townships of Lonoke County are listed below; listed in parentheses are the cities, towns, and/or census-designated places that are fully or partially inside the township.

- Butler
- Carlisle (Carlisle)
- Caroline (Austin, small part of Cabot, part of Ward)
- Cleveland
- Crooked Creek (Allport, Humnoke)
- Dortch (CDP Scott)
- Eagle
- Fletcher
- Furlow
- Goodrum
- Gray
- Gum Woods (England)
- Hamilton
- Indian Bayou (Coy)
- Isbell
- Lafayette (Keo)
- Lonoke (Lonoke)
- Magness (part of Cabot)
- Oak Grove (small part of Cabot)
- Pettus
- Prairie
- Pulaski
- Richwoods
- Scott
- Totten
- Walls
- Ward (part of Ward)
- Williams
- York (most of Cabot)

== Education ==
School districts include:

- Cabot Public Schools
- Carlisle School District
- Des Arc Public Schools
- England School District
- Jacksonville North Pulaski School District
- Lonoke School District
- Pulaski County Special School District

== See also ==
- List of counties in Arkansas
- List of dry counties in Arkansas
- List of lakes in Lonoke County, Arkansas
- National Register of Historic Places listings in Lonoke County, Arkansas
