= Arkansas Highway 36 =

State highway in Arkansas, United States

Highway 36

Route information
- Maintained by ArDOT
- Existed: 1926–present

Section 1
- Length: 50.51 mi (81.29 km)
- West end: US 64 at Hamlet
- Major intersections: AR 5 in Rose Bud; AR 13 in Searcy
- East end: I-57 / US 64 / US 67 / US 167 / AR 367 in Searcy

Section 2
- Length: 17.45 mi (28.08 km)
- West end: I-57 / US 64 / US 67 / US 167 / US 67B in Searcy
- East end: Dee Mears Road in Georgetown

Location
- Country: United States
- State: Arkansas
- Counties: Faulkner, White

Highway system
- Arkansas Highway System; Interstate; US; State; Business; Spurs; Suffixed; Scenic; Heritage
← AR 35	→ AR 37

Arkansas Highway 36 (AR 36) is a designation for two state highways in Central Arkansas. One segment of 50.51 miles (81.29 km) runs from U.S. Route 64 (US 64) at Hamlet east to Interstate 57 (I-57) in Searcy. A second segment of 17.45 miles (28.08 km) runs from I-57 in Searcy east to Georgetown. Both routes are maintained by the Arkansas Department of Transportation (ARDOT).

One of the original 1926 Arkansas state highways, Highway 36 was established between Hamlet to Searcy largely along its modern alignment. Extensions to Kensett in 1938 and Georgetown in 1945 established the highway's present eastern terminus. The alignment through Searcy has also changed through the years to accompany the growth of the city as a regional hub, and the increased role of US 67 in the region's transportation system.

== Route description ==
=== Hamlet to Searcy ===
Highway 36 begins at US 64 at Hamlet and runs north through rural parts of the Arkansas Valley ecoregion, passing the Liberty School Cafeteria, a historic building listed on the National Register of Historic Places. Winding north through a sparsely populated rural area, Highway 36 serves as the southern terminus for Highway 287 in Holland and Highway 107 near Enola. Approaching the White County line, Highway 36 meets Highway 310 in the small town of Mount Vernon. The route continues north, crossing the East Fork Cadron Creek before entering White County.

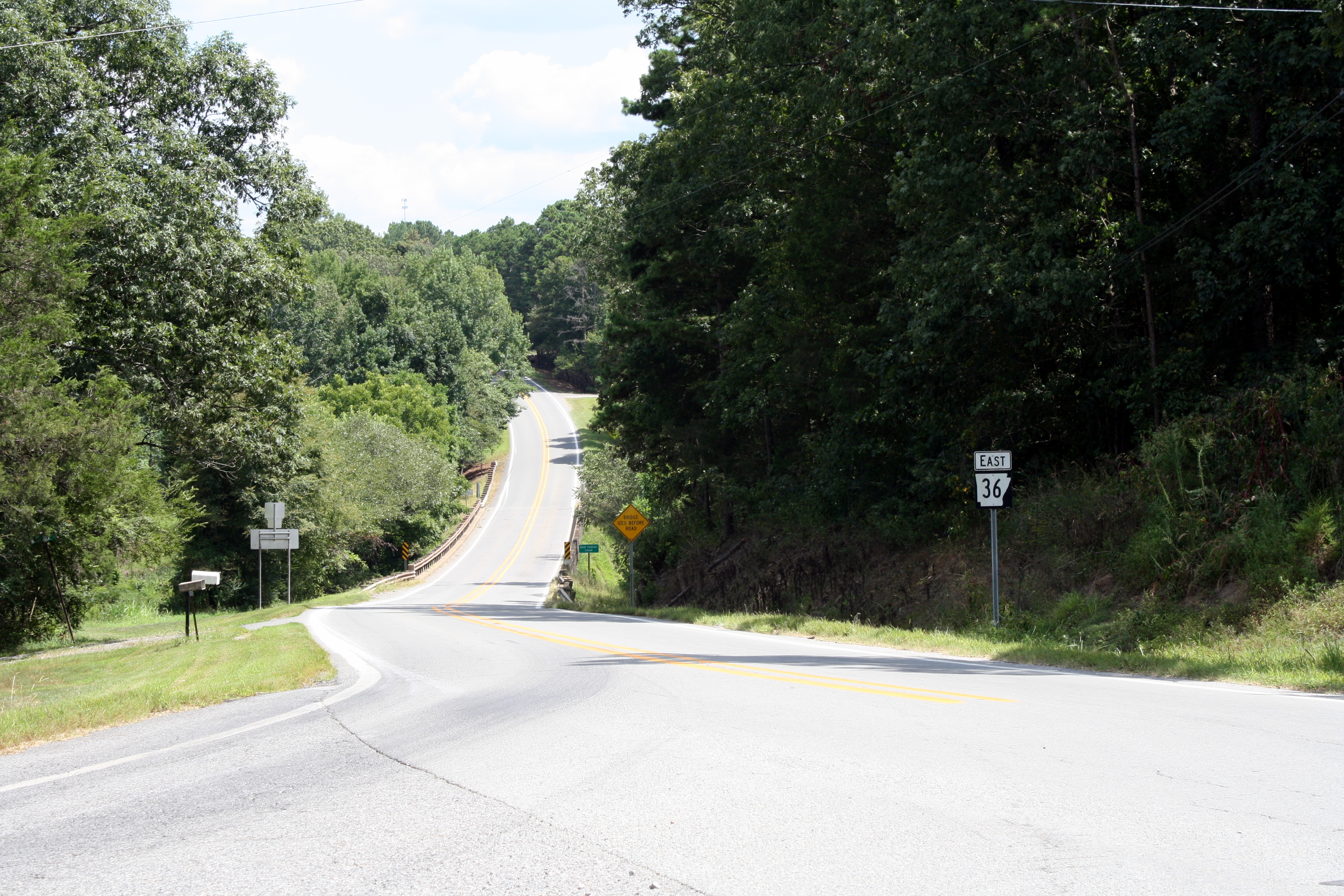
Highway 36 looking east in Rose Bud

Upon entering White County, Highway 36 enters Rose Bud, a small town. Highway 36 serves as the eastern terminus of Highway 124 before again bridging the East Fork Cadron Creek. Continuing east, the route has a very brief concurrency with Highway 5, a major north–south highway in the region. East of Rose Bud, Highway 36 continues through rural lands predominantly used for ranching or broiler production on its way to Searcy, a regional population and economic center. Highway 36 passes unincorporated communities such as Joy and Center Hill, and junctions with Highway 310, Highway 305, and Highway 320. The highway passes two NRHP properties on its way to Searcy: the Titan II ICBM Launch Complex 373-5 Site and Smyrna Methodist Church.

Upon entering Searcy, the county seat of White County, Highway 36 is known as the Beebe Capps Expressway, named for Searcy legislators Mike Beebe (who would later be elected Governor of Arkansas) and John Paul Capps, who were both instrumental in its construction. The route is a four-lane divided highway, with a two-way left turn lane (TWLTL) across most of the city. Highway 36 has an intersection with Highway 13 (Sunset Park Road / Honey Hill Road) along the western Searcy city limits before entering a residential area. In the city, Highway 36 has an intersection with US 67B (Pleasure Avenue), passing Searcy Public Schools' Southwest Middle School before another intersection with US 67B (Main Street). East of the second intersection with US 67B, Highway 36 intersects Burks Drive, the entrance to Harding University, before entering an industrial area of the city and intersecting I-57/US 64/US 67/US 167, which provides access to Little Rock to the south and St. Louis, Missouri to the north. Highway 36 continues east to a junction with Highway 367 (Eastline Road), where it terminates.

=== Searcy to Georgetown ===
The route begins at I-57/US 64/US 67/US 167 in Searcy as a continuation of US 67B and runs east as Race Avenue, intersecting Highway 367 (Eastline Road) near Doniphan Lake and the Doniphan Lumber Mill Historic District and angling south to enter the small town of Kensett. Highway 36 is named Wilbur D. Mills Avenue in Kensett, the birthplace of the 38-year United States Congressman and 1972 Democratic presidential primary candidate known as "the most powerful man in Washington DC" during his time chairing the House Ways and Means Committee. Passing near Mills' longtime home, now listed as the Mills House on the NRHP, the highway serves as the northern terminus of Highway 385 (SE 1st Street), which leads to downtown Kensett. Highway 36 continues southeasterly until turning onto SE 4th Street, crossing Black Creek, and exiting Kensett. East of Kensett, Highway 36 runs east and begins paralleling the Little Red River near the Bald Knob National Wildlife Refuge (NWR) to the small town of West Point. Highway 36 serves as the northern terminus of Highway 323 (Pete's Road) before turning toward the river and downtown. Once downtown, Highway 36 turns along Front Street, paralleling the Little Red River eastbound, passing West Point City Hall and the Otha Walker Homestead and exiting town heading toward the southeast corner of White County. Passing through sparsely populated country, Highway 36 runs through Andrews and Pryor, curves around Taylor Slough, and passes Entight and the Henry Gray Hurricane Lake Wildlife Management Area (WMA) before terminating in the small town of Georgetown, where it continues as Dee Mears Road.

ARDOT maintains Highway 36 like all other parts of the state highway system. As a part of these responsibilities, the Department tracks the volume of traffic using its roads in surveys using a metric called average annual daily traffic (AADT). ARDOT estimates the traffic level for a segment of roadway for any average day of the year in these surveys. As of 2018, the peak AADT on the highway was 24,000 vehicles per day (VPD) as the Beebe-Capps Expressway in Searcy near the Sawmill Road intersection. Traffic volume drops quickly heading west, below 10,000 west of the Honey Hill Road intersection, and below 5,000 by the western city limits of Searcy. Between Rose Bud and Searcy, Highway 36 sees around 4,000 VPD, and west of Rose Bud, the highway sees around 2,000 VPD, increasing to 3,900 VPD near the western terminus. Eastbound, Highway 36 sees 19,000 VPD near downtown Searcy and around 12,000 VPD near I-57/US 67, establishing it as the second-most used entrance to the city from I-57 (behind the 21,000 using Race Avenue). Counts dropped to 4,100 VPD in Kensett, and as low as 470 VPD east of West Point.

No segment of Highway 36 has been listed as part of the National Highway System, a network of roads important to the nation's economy, defense, and mobility.

== History ==
Highway 36 was created during the original 1926 Arkansas state highway numbering between State Road 60 (now US 64) at Hamlet and Searcy. It was extended east to Kensett around 1938, and to Georgetown around 1945. The section connecting US 67 near Doniphan to Searcy became US 67C (now US 67B) as part of a major realignment of US 67 in 1950. A realignment in Kensett shifted Highway 36 from Searcy Street to Marquad Avenue (today Wilbur D. Mills Avenue) on August 2, 1961. Following construction of a four-lane US 67 (now I-57) along the east side of Searcy, Highway 36 replaced part of US 67C through Searcy. The Highway 36 and US 67B alignment was changed again on December 5, 1991 and again on May 13, 1998.

Much of Highway 36 through Searcy closely follows the former Missouri and North Arkansas Railroad tracks. Some track section are still visible in parking lots along Mulberry Avenue.

== Major intersections ==
Mile markers reset at some concurrencies.

County	Location	mi	km	Destinations	Notes
Faulkner	Hamlet	0.00	0.00	US 64 – Beebe, Conway	Western terminus
Faulkner	Holland	5.62	9.04	AR 287 north – Holland	Southern terminus of AR 287
Faulkner		8.66	13.94	AR 107 north – Enola	Southern terminus of AR 107
Faulkner		15.37	24.74	AR 310 west	Eastern terminus of AR 310
Faulkner	Mount Vernon	17.00	27.36	AR 310 east	Western terminus of AR 310
White	Rose Bud	25.62	41.23	AR 124 west	Eastern terminus of AR 124
White	Rose Bud	26.57	42.76	AR 5 south – El Paso	Western end of AR 5 concurrency
White	Rose Bud	26.61	42.82	AR 5 north – Heber Springs	Eastern end of AR 5 concurrency
White		32.75	52.71	AR 310 east	Western terminus of AR 310
White	Center Hill	39.10	62.93	AR 305 south – Floyd	Northern terminus of AR 305
White		40.69	65.48	AR 320 south	Northern terminus of AR 320
White	Searcy	44.72	71.97	AR 13 (Sunset Park Road / Honey Hill Road)	Former AR 371
White	Searcy	48.12	77.44	US 67B (Main Street)	
White	Searcy	50.22	80.82	I-57 / US 64 / US 67 / US 167 – Little Rock, Bald Knob, St. Louis	Exit 45 on I-57
White	Searcy	50.51	81.29	AR 367 (Eastline Road)	Eastern terminus; former US 67
White	Searcy	Gap in route			
White	Searcy	0.00	0.00	US 67B south	Continuation south
White	Searcy	0.00	0.00	I-57 / US 64 / US 67 / US 167 – Little Rock, Bald Knob, St. Louis	Exit 46 on I-57
White	Searcy–Kensett line	0.45	0.72	AR 367 (Eastline Road)	Former US 67
White	Kensett	1.85	2.98	AR 385 south	Northern terminus of AR 385
White	West Point	6.04	9.72	AR 323 south (Pete's Road)	Northern terminus of AR 323
White	Georgetown	17.45	28.08	Dee Mears Road	Continuation north
1.000 mi = 1.609 km; 1.000 km = 0.621 mi: Concurrency terminus

== See also ==
- List of state highways in Arkansas
