= List of railway towns in the United States =

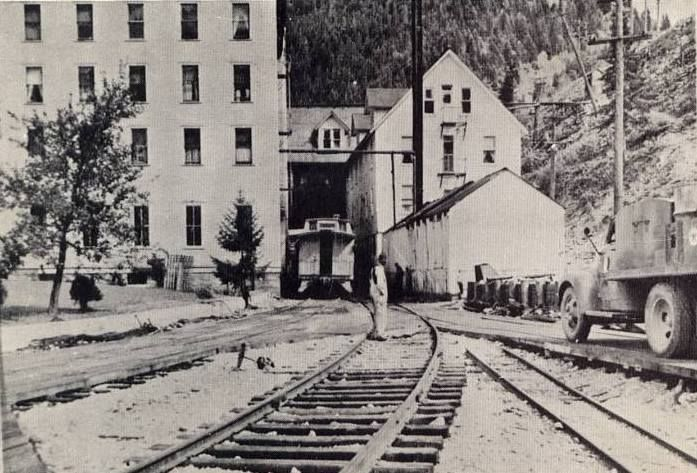
A narrow-gauge railway running through the center of Burke, Idaho.

This is a list of railway towns in the United States listed by state. The United States has a high concentration of railway towns, communities that developed and/or were built around a railway system. Railway towns are particularly abundant in the midwest and western states, and the railroad has been credited as a major force in the economic and geographic development of the country. Historians credit the railroad system for the country's vast development in the nineteenth and twentieth centuries, as well as having helped facilitate a "unified" nation.

== Alabama ==
- Birmingham

== Alaska ==
- Fairbanks
- Seward

== Arizona ==
- Benson
- Williams

== Arkansas ==
- Alicia
- Altheimer
- Altus
- Arkadelphia
- Ashdown
- Atkins
- Augusta
- Austin
- Bald Knob
- Beebe
- Bigelow
- Booneville
- Bradford
- Brinkley
- Bryant
- Cabot
- Calvin
- Camden
- Carlisle
- Clarksville
- Conway
- Corning
- Danville
- Decatur
- Delaplaine
- DeWitt
- Dumas
- Emmet
- England
- Fordyce
- Forrest City
- Garner
- Gurdon
- Hazen
- Helena–West Helena
- Higginson
- Hope
- Hot Springs
- Hoxie
- Jacksonville
- Keevil
- Kingsland
- Knobel
- Leslie
- Lonoke
- Malvern
- McCrory
- McGehee
- McRae
- Mena
- Minturn
- Newport
- North Little Rock
- O'Kean
- Palestine
- Patterson
- Peach Orchard
- Pine Bluff
- Poyen
- Prescott
- Redfield
- Rison
- Russell
- Russellville
- Searcy
- St. Joe
- Swifton
- Tuckerman
- Ward
- Wrightsville

== California ==
- Chino
- Barstow
- Davis
- Fresno
- Lathrop
- Livermore
- Los Angeles
- Sacramento
- San Bernardino
- Stockton
- Woodland

== Colorado ==
- Antonito
- Denver
- Durango
- Julesburg
- Pueblo

== Georgia ==
- Atlanta (est. as Terminus)

== Idaho ==
- Pocatello
- Avery
- Burke
- Nampa
- Wallace

== Illinois ==
- Centralia
- Champaign
- Chicago
- West Chicago
- Rochelle

== Iowa ==
- Ames

== Kansas ==
- Dodge City

== Kentucky ==
- Midway

== Maryland ==
- Baltimore
- Brunswick
- Cumberland
- Hagerstown

== Missouri ==
- Kansas City
- St. Louis

== Montana ==
- Billings
- Dillon
- Laurel
- Livingston
- Havre

== Louisiana ==
- Hammond

== Nebraska ==
- North Platte
- Omaha

== Nevada ==
- Carson City
- Las Vegas
- Virginia City

== New Hampshire ==
- Woodsville

== New Mexico ==
- Albuquerque
- Chama

== North Carolina ==
- Apex
- Durham
- Ellenboro
- Goldsboro
- High Point
- Morehead City
- Weldon

== North Dakota ==
- Barton
- Enderlin
- Taylor

== Oklahoma ==
- Guthrie
- Stillwater

== Oregon ==
- Baker City
- Boring
- Bull Run
- Cazadero
- Estacada
- Portland
- Shaniko
- Union

== Pennsylvania ==
- Altoona
- Pittsburgh
- Scranton

== Tennessee ==
- Chattanooga
- Etowah
- Nashville

== Texas ==
- Kilgore
- Port Arthur
- Wills Point
- Elgin
- College Station

== Utah ==
- Helper
- Salt Lake City

== Vermont ==
- Island Pond
- White River Junction
- Wells River

== Virginia ==
- Clifton Forge, home to Chesapeake & Ohio (C&O) shops.
- Crewe
- Roanoke, home to shops and locomotive works of the Norfolk & Western (N&W).
- Victoria, home to the Virginian Railway (VGN) shops.

== Washington (state) ==
- Kalama
- Lester
- Melmont
- Spokane
- Tacoma

== West Virginia ==
- Wheeling
- Harper's Ferry
- Huntington, founded as terminus for Chesapeake & Ohio

== Wyoming ==
- Cheyenne
- Laramie
