= Barney, Arkansas =

- Unincorporated community
- Location within Arkansas Location within the United States
- Coordinates: 35°15′06″N 92°12′25″W
- Country: United States
- State: Arkansas
- County: Faulkner
- Elevation: 489 ft (149 m)
- Time zone: UTC-6 (Central (CST))
  - Summer (DST): UTC-5 (CDT)
- Area code: 501
- GNIS feature ID: 57331

Barney is an unincorporated community in Faulkner County, Arkansas, United States. The community is located along Arkansas Highway 107 3.9 miles (6.3 km) north of Enola.

The Blessing Farmstead, which is listed on the National Register of Historic Places, is near the community.
