= Kensett, Arkansas =

- City
- Location of Kensett in White County, Arkansas.
- Coordinates: 35°14′08″N 91°40′15″W
- Country: United States
- State: Arkansas
- County: White

Area
  - Total: 1.88 sq mi (4.87 km^{2})
  - Land: 1.86 sq mi (4.83 km^{2})
  - Water: 0.012 sq mi (0.03 km^{2})
- Elevation: 226 ft (69 m)

Population (2020)
  - Total: 1,400
  - Estimate (2025): 1,425 ▲
  - Density: 750.4/sq mi (289.75/km^{2})
- Time zone: UTC-6 (Central (CST))
  - Summer (DST): UTC-5 (CDT)
- ZIP code: 72082
- Area code: 501
- FIPS code: 05-36430
- GNIS feature ID: 2404822
- Website: kensettar.gov

Kensett is a city in White County, Arkansas, United States. Located adjacent to the east side of Searcy, the city is the hometown of noted legislator Wilbur D. Mills, who was influential throughout the 1960s and 1970s in the United States House of Representatives.

Allen Edge is the current mayor. As of the 2020 census, Kensett had a population of 1,400. Many companies have moved to Kensett to support the natural gas industry. Kensett is a center for landscaping and nursery activity. Double Springs sod farm is located in or near Kensett. There are several restaurants, and Kensett has the lowest sales tax rate in White County.

== Geography ==
According to the United States Census Bureau, the city has a total area of 1.8 square miles (4.7 km^{2}), of which 1.8 square miles (4.7 km^{2}) is land and 0.56% is water. The city is bounded on its east by Black Creek, a tributary of the Little Red River that lies farther northeast and east.

== Demographics ==
Historical population
Census	Pop.	Note	%±
1880	86		—
1920	480		—
1930	889		85.2%
1940	827		−7.0%
1950	829		0.2%
1960	905		9.2%
1970	1,444		59.6%
1980	1,751		21.3%
1990	1,741		−0.6%
2000	1,791		2.9%
2010	1,648		−8.0%
2020	1,400		−15.0%
2025 (est.)	1,425	▲	1.8%
U.S. Decennial Census

=== 2020 census ===
As of the 2020 census, Kensett had a population of 1,400. The median age was 39.8 years. 24.8% of residents were under the age of 18 and 19.7% were 65 years of age or older. For every 100 females, there were 90.0 males, and for every 100 females age 18 and over, there were 83.4 males.

94.4% of residents lived in urban areas, while 5.6% lived in rural areas.

There were 590 households in the city, including 407 families. Of all households, 31.4% had children under the age of 18 living with them. 36.8% were married-couple households, 20.3% were households with a male householder and no spouse or partner present, and 37.6% were households with a female householder and no spouse or partner present. About 34.1% of all households were made up of individuals, and 17.3% had someone living alone who was 65 years of age or older.

There were 687 housing units, of which 14.1% were vacant. The homeowner vacancy rate was 1.8%, and the rental vacancy rate was 9.5%.

Kensett racial composition
Race	Number	Percentage
White (non-Hispanic)	828	59.14%
Black or African American (non-Hispanic)	219	15.64%
Native American	6	0.43%
Asian	4	0.29%
Other/Mixed	95	6.79%
Hispanic or Latino	248	17.71%

=== 2000 census ===
As of the census of 2000, there were 1,791 people, 699 households, and 445 families residing in the city. The population density was 1,008.4 inhabitants per square mile (389.3/km^{2}). There were 778 housing units at an average density of 438.0 per square mile (169.1/km^{2}). The racial makeup of the city was 70.24% White, 24.29% Black or African American, 0.17% Native American, 0.37% Asian, 2.40% from other races, and 2.57% from two or more races. 4.02% of the population were Hispanic or Latino of any race.

There were 699 households, out of which 29.6% had children under the age of 18 living with them, 41.1% were married couples living together, 17.9% had a female householder with no husband present, and 36.2% were non-families. 32.3% of all households were made up of individuals, and 14.3% had someone living alone who was 65 years of age or older. The average household size was 2.42 and the average family size was 3.06.

In the city, the population was spread out, with 26.0% under the age of 18, 7.9% from 18 to 24, 25.5% from 25 to 44, 20.8% from 45 to 64, and 19.9% who were 65 years of age or older. The median age was 38 years. For every 100 females, there were 80.7 males. For every 100 females age 18 and over, there were 74.5 males.

The median income for a household in the city was $20,478, and the median income for a family was $26,161. Males had a median income of $22,763 versus $17,500 for females. The per capita income for the city was $11,049. About 26.3% of families and 30.6% of the population were below the poverty line, including 48.5% of those under age 18 and 21.4% of those age 65 or over.

== Education ==
Residents are zoned to the Riverview School District, which operates Kensett Elementary School, Riverview Junior High School in Searcy, and Riverview High School in Searcy.

The Riverview district is the result of a consolidation, effective July 1, 1991, of the Judsonia, Kensett, and Griffithville school districts.

== Transportation ==
Kensett is served by three state highways: Arkansas Highway 36 (Wilbur D. Mills Avenue/Northeast 4th Street), which runs across the width of White County into neighboring Faulkner County to the west, and southeast to the White River via West Point and Georgetown; Arkansas Highway 87 (Usery Road), running parallel to the current Union Pacific rail line and connecting southwest to Higginson; and Arkansas Highway 385 (Southeast 1st Street/Depot Street), leading south to Griffithville at Arkansas Highway 11. Additional major pathways include Searcy Street, which proceeds northeast to cross into neighboring Searcy as East Park Avenue, and Old Railroad Road, a secondary connection southeast to West Point.

== Notable natives and residents ==
- George Dickey - catcher for the Boston Red Sox and Chicago White Sox.
- Georgia Holt - singer-songwriter, actress, and model and mother of singer and actress Cher.
