= Mt. Zion Missionary Baptist Church (Enola, Arkansas) =

Historic church in Arkansas, United States

- U.S. National Register of Historic Places
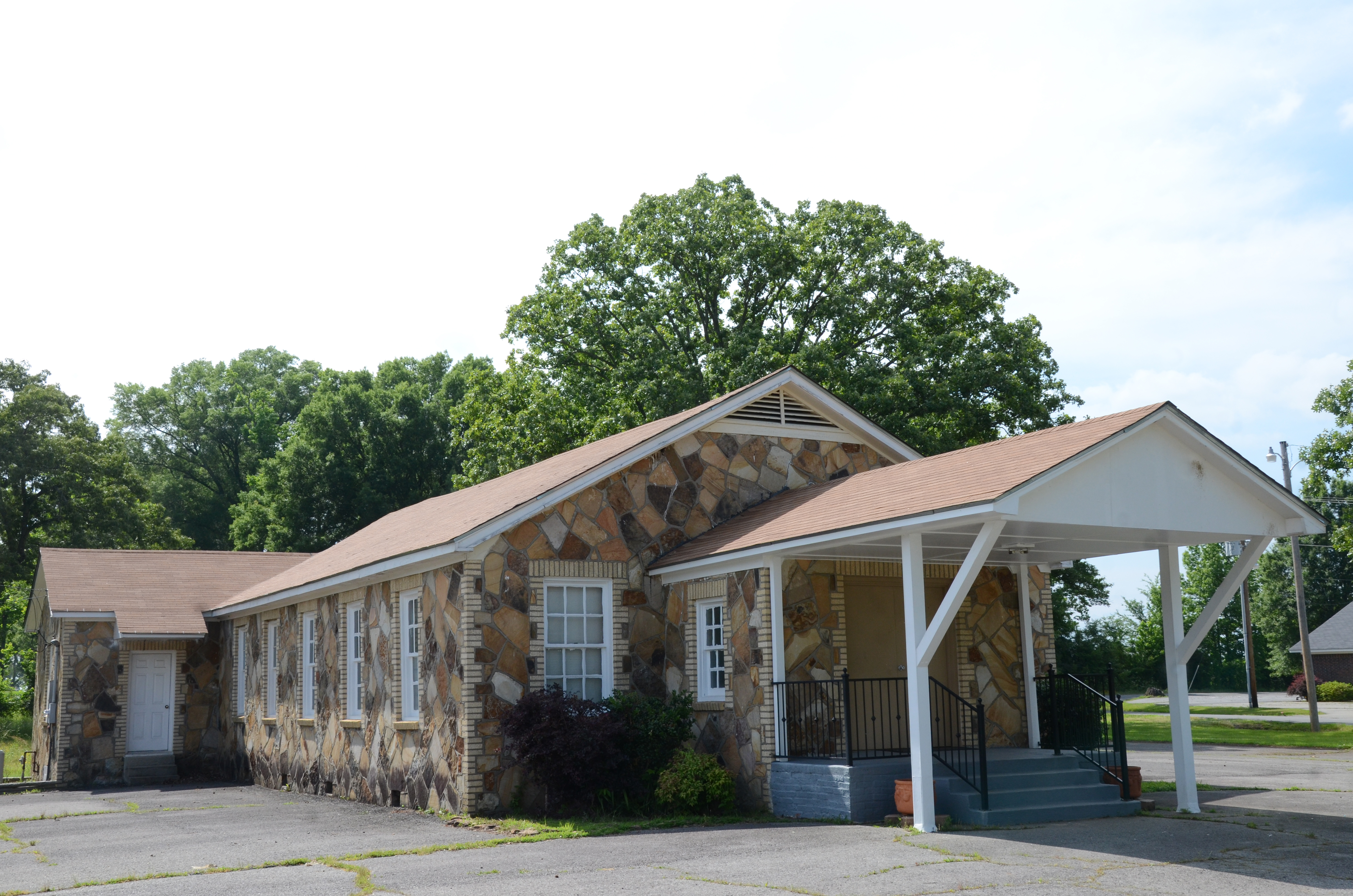

- Location within Arkansas Location within the United States
- Location: 249 AR 107, Enola, Arkansas
- Coordinates: 35°11′56″N 92°12′12″W
- Area: 1 acre (0.40 ha)
- Built: 1952
- Built by: Silas Owens, Sr (stonemason)
- Architectural style: Bungalow/American craftsman
- MPS: Mixed Masonry Buildings of Silas Owens, Sr. MPS
- NRHP reference No.: 09000003
- Added to NRHP: February 5, 2009

Mt. Zion Missionary Baptist Church, also known as the Enola Baptist Church, is a historic church at 249 AR 107 in Enola, Arkansas. It is a single-story masonry structure, built out of local fieldstone with cream-colored brick trim. The main block has a gabled roof, with a projecting vestibule and entrance sheltered by a gabled roof. A cross-gabled rear section projects slightly to the sides. The church was built about 1952, with the exterior stone veneer work done by Silas Owens, Sr., a locally renowned master mason, with the rear addition finished by his son, Silas Jr.

The building was listed on the National Register of Historic Places in 2009.

== See also ==
- National Register of Historic Places listings in Faulkner County, Arkansas
