= E.D. Maddox Farm Chicken House =

- U.S. National Register of Historic Places
- Location within Arkansas Location within the United States
- Location: AR 36 E of jct. with AR 5, Rosebud, Arkansas
- Coordinates: 35°19′57″N 92°4′25″W
- Area: less than one acre
- Built: 1938
- Architectural style: Diagonally-framed chicken house
- MPS: White County MPS
- NRHP reference No.: 91001359
- Added to NRHP: July 20, 1992

The E.D. Maddox Farm Chicken House is a historic farm outbuilding at the northwest corner of Arkansas Highway 36 and School Street in Rosebud, Arkansas. It is a single-story rectangular structure, with a side gable roof and a concrete foundation. A shed-roof porch extends across the front, with the main entrance to the structure set off-center underneath. The south (street-facing) facade presents a distinctive diagonally-sided exterior, a reflection of the building's interior construction, which is entirely of diagonally cut framing elements. Built in 1938, it is the only known structure with this type of construction in White County.

The building was listed on the National Register of Historic Places in 1992. It is probable this building has either been moved or demolished; satellite views indicate a church now stands where the farm was located.

== See also ==
- National Register of Historic Places listings in White County, Arkansas
