= Nimmo Clubhouse =

- U.S. National Register of Historic Places
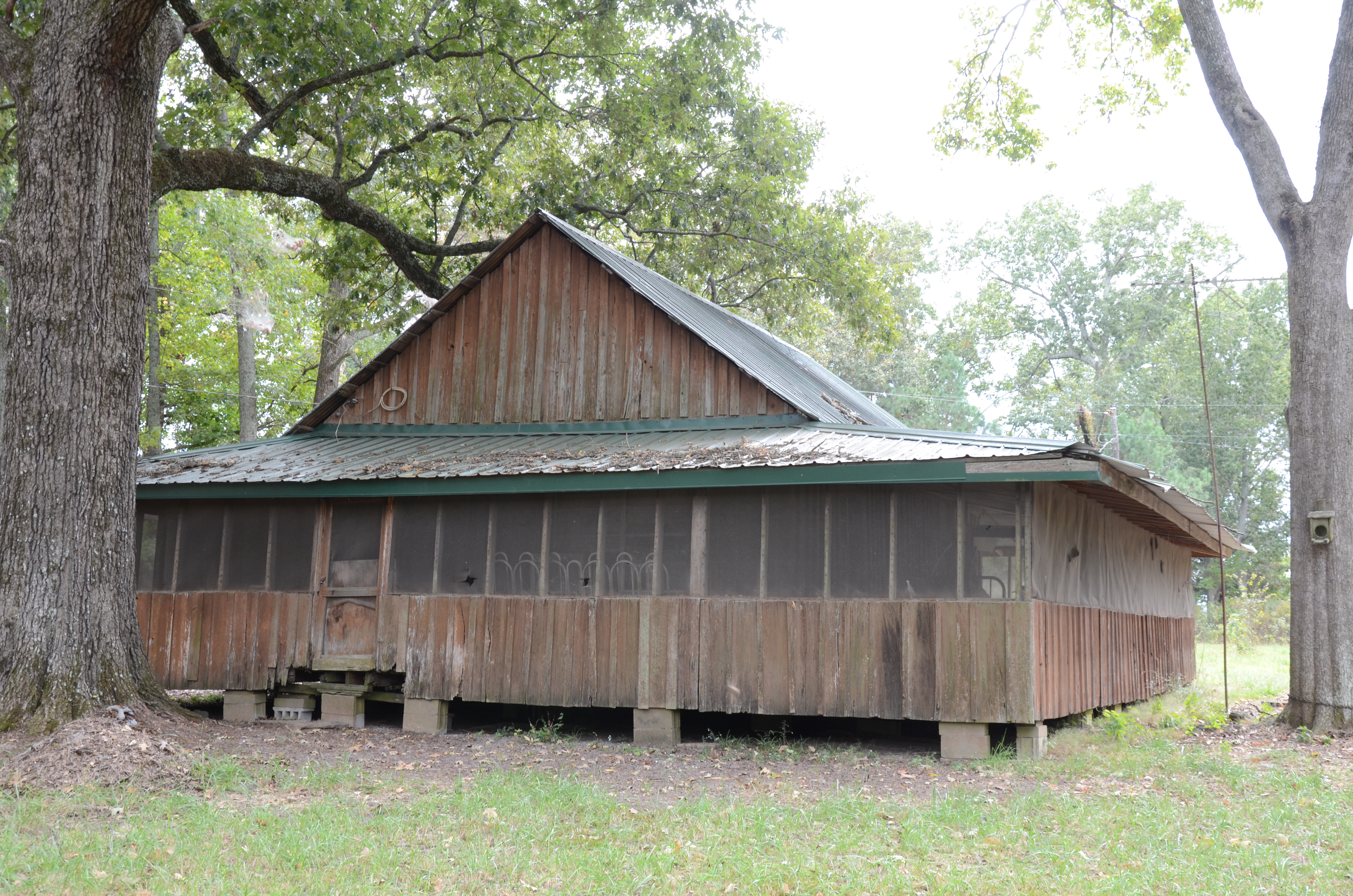

- Location within Arkansas Location within the United States
- Nearest city: Nimmo, Arkansas
- Coordinates: 35°11′3″N 91°28′34″W
- Area: less than one acre
- Built: 1930
- Architectural style: Vernacular double-pile
- MPS: White County MPS
- NRHP reference No.: 91001360
- Added to NRHP: July 22, 1992

The Nimmo Clubhouse is a historic building in rural White County, Arkansas. It is located on Nimmo Road, southeast of Kensett. It is a single-story box-framed structure, with a metal roof, board-and-batten siding, and a foundation of concrete blocks. Built about 1930 probably as a hunting lodge, it is one a few surviving examples in the county of Depression-era box frame construction.

The building was listed on the National Register of Historic Places in 1992.

== See also ==
- National Register of Historic Places listings in White County, Arkansas
