= Henry Klotz Sr. House =

Historic house in Arkansas, United States

- U.S. National Register of Historic Places
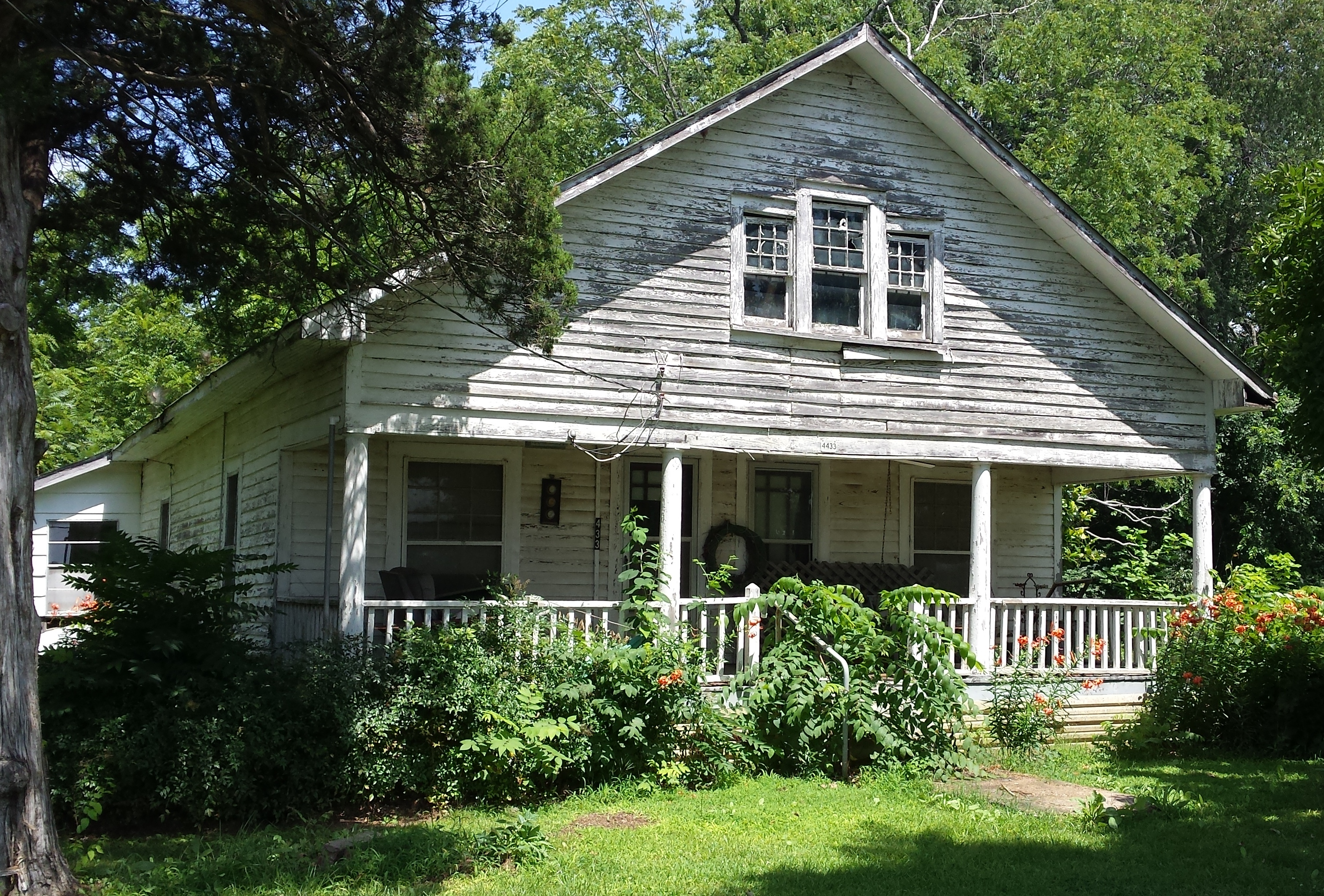

- Location within Arkansas Location within the United States
- Location: First St., Russell, Arkansas
- Coordinates: 35°21′52″N 91°30′26″W
- Area: less than one acre
- Built: 1921
- Architect: Herman Page
- MPS: White County MPS
- NRHP reference No.: 91001285
- Added to NRHP: July 22, 1992

The Henry Klotz Sr. House is a historic house of Henry W. Klotz Sr. on First Street in Russell, Arkansas. It is a single story wood-frame structure with a broad gabled roof and recessed porch. It was built in 1921 from prefabricated parts ordered by Henry Klotz from Sears, Roebuck. It is one of White County's few examples of a catalog mail-order house. The house does not match any known catalog entry by the company, suggesting that either Klotz or the builder made alterations on site.

The house was listed on the National Register of Historic Places in 1992.

== See also ==
- National Register of Historic Places listings in White County, Arkansas
