= Crow Lake =

Crow Lake may refer to:

== Geography ==
- Crow Lake Township, Minnesota
- Crow Lake, South Dakota
- Crow Lake Township, South Dakota
- Crow Lake (Alaska)
- Crow Lake (Arkansas)
- Crow Lake (Idaho)
- Crow Lake (Alger County, Michigan)
- Crow Lake (Mackinac County, Michigan)
- Crow Lake (Cook County, Minnesota)
- Crow Lake (Stearns County, Minnesota)
- Crow Lake (Montana)
- Crow Lake (New Mexico)
- Crow Lake (Barnes County, North Dakota)
- Crow Lake (Dickey County, North Dakota)
- Crow Lake (Rolette County, North Dakota)
- Crow Lake (South Dakota)
- Crow Lake (Okanogan County, Washington)
- Crow Lake (Yakima County, Washington)
- Crow Lake (Wisconsin)
- Kakagi Lake, a lake in Ontario also known as Crow Lake

== Other uses ==
- Crow Lake (novel), novel by Mary Lawson
