= Otha Walker Homestead =

Historic house in Arkansas, United States

- U.S. National Register of Historic Places
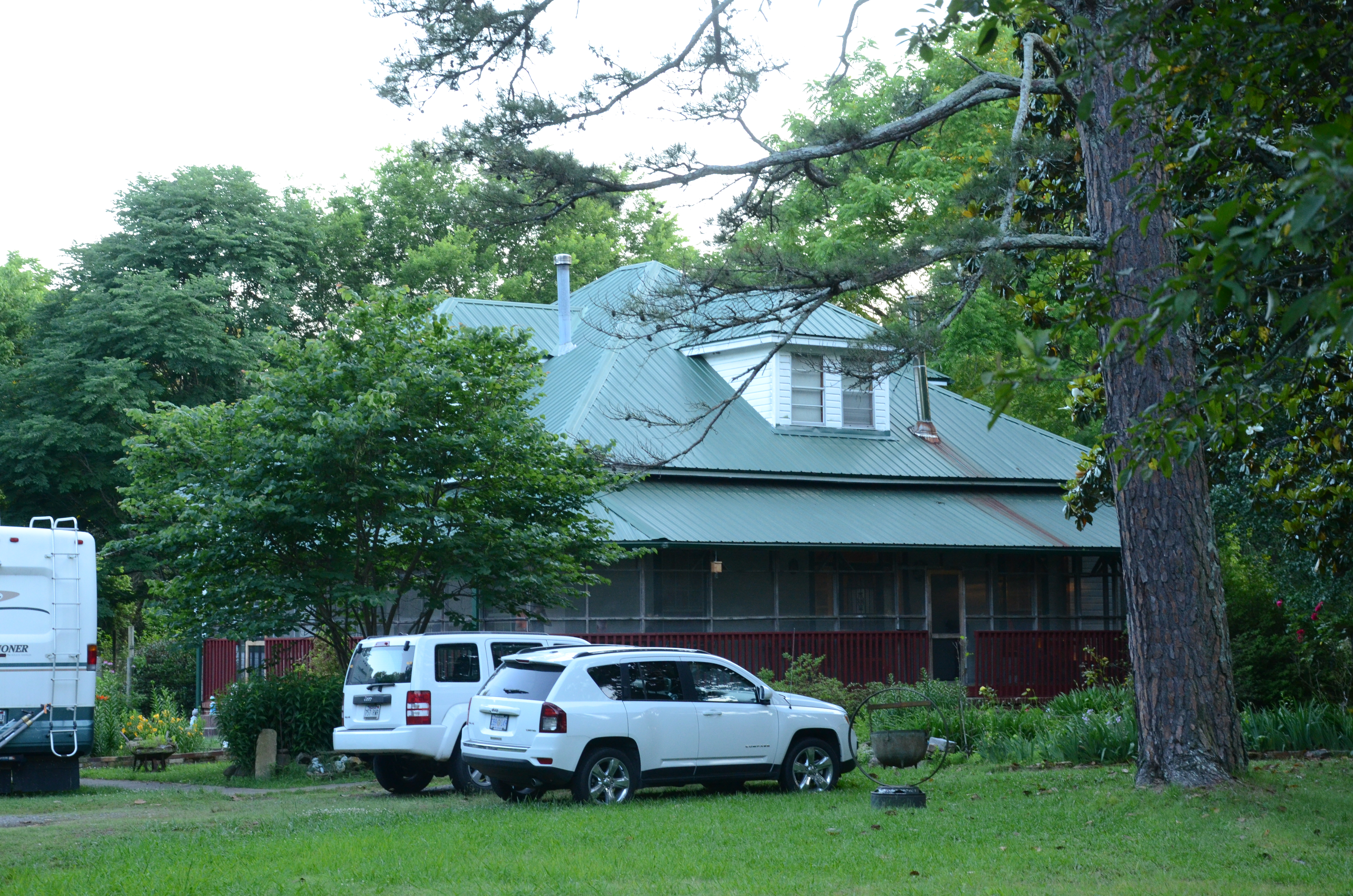

- Location within Arkansas Location within the United States
- Nearest city: West Point, Arkansas
- Coordinates: 35°12′12″N 91°36′27″W
- Area: less than one acre
- Built: 1915
- Architectural style: Vernacular double-pile
- MPS: White County MPS
- NRHP reference No.: 91001354
- Added to NRHP: July 23, 1992

The Otha Walker Homestead is a historic house on the south side of Arkansas Highway 36, east of the small town of West Point, Arkansas. It is a 1 1/2-story double-pile central hall plan structure, topped by a hip roof and clad in novelty siding. A porch extends across the front (north) facade and around the east side, with a shed roof that has exposed rafter ends, and is supported by wooden box columns. The house, built about 1915, is one of the few of this type built in White County between 1914 and 1939.

The house was listed on the National Register of Historic Places in 1992.

== See also ==
- National Register of Historic Places listings in White County, Arkansas
