= Mount Vernon, Arkansas =

- City
- Location of Mount Vernon in Faulkner County, Arkansas.
- Coordinates: 35°13′30″N 92°7′29″W
- Country: United States
- State: Arkansas
- County: Faulkner

Area
  - City: 1.01 sq mi (2.62 km^{2})
  - Land: 1.01 sq mi (2.62 km^{2})
  - Water: 0 sq mi (0.00 km^{2})
- Elevation: 423 ft (129 m)

Population (2020)
  - City: 144
  - Estimate (2025): 148 ▲
  - Density: 142.4/sq mi (54.99/km^{2})
  - Metro: 748,031
- Time zone: UTC-6 (Central (CST))
  - Summer (DST): UTC-5 (CDT)
- ZIP code: 72111
- Area code: 501
- FIPS code: 05-48020
- GNIS feature ID: 2406214

Mount Vernon is a town in Faulkner County, Arkansas, United States. As of the 2020 census, Mount Vernon had a population of 144. It is part of the Central Arkansas region.

== Geography ==
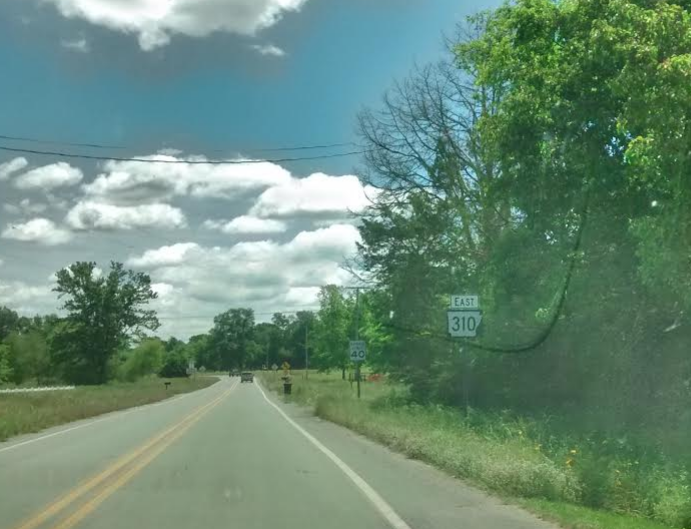
AR 310 in Mount Vernon, May 2016

Mount Vernon is located along the eastern edge of Faulkner County. The eastern border of the town follows the White County line.

Arkansas Highway 36 passes through Mount Vernon, leading north 9 miles (14 km) to Rose Bud, and southwest 17 miles (27 km) to U.S. Route 64 at Hamlet. Conway, the Faulkner County seat, is 25 miles (40 km) southwest of Mount Vernon via AR-36 and US-64.

According to the United States Census Bureau, the town of Mount Vernon has a total area of 0.39 square miles (1.0 km^{2}), all land.

== Demographics ==
Historical population
Census	Pop.	Note	%±
1880	161		—
1980	157		—
1990	192		22.3%
2000	144		−25.0%
2010	145		0.7%
2020	144		−0.7%
2025 (est.)	148	▲	2.8%
U.S. Decennial Census

As of the census of 2000, there were 144 people, 57 households, and 44 families residing in the city. The population density was 55.6/km^{2} (143.9/mi^{2}). There were 68 housing units at an average density of 26.3/km^{2} (68.0/mi^{2}). The racial makeup of the city was 98.61% White, 0.69% from other races, and 0.69% from two or more races. 1.39% of the population were Hispanic or Latino of any race.

There were 57 households, out of which 33.3% had children under the age of 18 living with them, 63.2% were married couples living together, 14.0% had a female householder with no husband present, and 22.8% were non-families. 22.8% of all households were made up of individuals, and 10.5% had someone living alone who was 65 years of age or older. The average household size was 2.53 and the average family size was 2.98.

In the city the population was spread out, with 26.4% under the age of 8, 7.6% from 18 to 24, 20.8% from 25 to 44, 25.7% from 45 to 64, and 19.4% who were 65 years of age or older. The median age was 42 years. For every 100 females, there were 87.0 males. For every 100 females age 18 and over, there were 76.7 males.

The median income for a household in the city was $26,406, and the median income for a family was $40,625. Males had a median income of $28,750 versus $30,625 for females. The per capita income for the city was $12,593. There were none of the families and 4.9% of the population living below the poverty line, including no under eighteens and 12.9% of those over 64.

== Education ==
Public education for elementary and secondary school students is provided by the Mount Vernon–Enola School District, Which leads to graduation from Mount Vernon–Enola High School. The district was formed by the July 1, 1991, consolidation of the Enola School District and the Mount Vernon School District.

== See also ==
- List of cities and towns in Arkansas
