= Joy, Arkansas =

- Unincorporated community
- Location within Arkansas Location within the United States
- Coordinates: 35°17′15″N 91°57′02″W
- Country: United States
- State: Arkansas
- County: White
- Elevation: 761 ft (232 m)
- Time zone: UTC-6 (Central (CST))
  - Summer (DST): UTC-5 (CDT)
- Area code: 501
- GNIS feature ID: 50752

Joy is an unincorporated community in White County, Arkansas, United States. Joy is located along Arkansas Highway 36, 12.6 miles (20.3 km) west-northwest of Searcy.
