= Pickens, White County, Arkansas =

Pickens, Arkansas
- Unincorporated community
- Location within Arkansas Location within the United States
- Coordinates: 35°20′51″N 91°52′28″W
- Country: United States
- State: Arkansas
- County: White
- Elevation: 299 ft (91 m)
- Time zone: UTC-6 (Central (CST))
  - Summer (DST): UTC-5 (CDT)
- Area code: 501
- GNIS feature ID: 58362

Pickens is an unincorporated community in White County, Arkansas, United States. Pickens is located along Arkansas Highway 310, 2.7 miles (4.3 km) west-southwest of Letona.
