= Pickens, Arkansas =

Pickens, Arkansas may refer to:

- Pickens, Desha County, Arkansas, an unincorporated community in Desha County
- Pickens, White County, Arkansas, an unincorporated community in White County
