= Higginson, Arkansas =

- City
- Location of Higginson in White County, Arkansas.
- Coordinates: 35°11′49″N 91°42′55″W
- Country: United States
- State: Arkansas
- County: White

Area
  - Total: 1.27 sq mi (3.29 km^{2})
  - Land: 1.27 sq mi (3.29 km^{2})
  - Water: 0 sq mi (0.00 km^{2})
- Elevation: 217 ft (66 m)

Population (2020)
  - Total: 705
  - Estimate (2025): 945 ▲
  - Density: 555.2/sq mi (214.36/km^{2})
- Time zone: UTC-6 (Central (CST))
  - Summer (DST): UTC-5 (CDT)
- ZIP code: 72068
- Area code: 501
- FIPS code: 05-32140
- GNIS feature ID: 2405827

Higginson is a second-class city in White County, Arkansas, United States.

The population was 705 at the 2020 census.

== Geography ==
According to the United States Census Bureau, the town has a total area of 0.8 square miles (2.1 km^{2}), all land.

=== Climate ===
The climate in this area is characterized by hot, humid summers and generally mild to cool winters. According to the Köppen Climate Classification system, Higginson has a humid subtropical climate, abbreviated "Cfa" on climate maps.

== Demographics ==
Historical population
Census	Pop.	Note	%±
1910	192		—
1920	239		24.5%
1930	195		−18.4%
1940	166		−14.9%
1950	131		−21.1%
1960	183		39.7%
1970	343		87.4%
1980	333		−2.9%
1990	255		−23.4%
2000	378		48.2%
2010	621		64.3%
2020	705		13.5%
2025 (est.)	945	▲	34.0%
U.S. Decennial Census

As of the census of 2000, there were 378 people, 145 households, and 103 families residing in the town. The population density was 493.6 inhabitants per square mile (190.6/km^{2}). There were 165 housing units at an average density of 215.5 per square mile (83.2/km^{2}). The racial makeup of the town was 97.35% White, 0.26% Native American, 0.26% Asian, and 2.12% from two or more races. 1.85% of the population were Hispanic or Latino of any race.

There were 145 households, out of which 31.0% had children under the age of 18 living with them, 59.3% were married couples living together, 7.6% had a female householder with no husband present, and 28.3% were non-families. 20.0% of all households were made up of individuals, and 4.8% had someone living alone who was 65 years of age or older. The average household size was 2.61 and the average family size was 3.06.

In the town, the population was spread out, with 25.4% under the age of 18, 11.1% from 18 to 24, 28.8% from 25 to 44, 27.0% from 45 to 64, and 7.7% who were 65 years of age or older. The median age was 34 years. For every 100 females, there were 95.9 males. For every 100 females age 18 and over, there were 101.4 males.

The median income for a household in the town was $25,114, and the median income for a family was $29,250. Males had a median income of $26,750 versus $17,344 for females. The per capita income for the town was $11,568. About 13.7% of families and 18.2% of the population were below the poverty line, including 28.8% of those under age 18 and 20.0% of those age 65 or over.

== Education ==
It is zoned to Searcy Public Schools, which operates Searcy High School.
