= Doniphan Lumber Mill Historic District =

Historic district in Arkansas, United States

- U.S. National Register of Historic Places
- U.S. Historic district
- Location: Around Doniphan Lake off AR 367, Doniphan, Arkansas
- Area: 65 acres (26 ha)
- Built by: C.J. Carter Lumber Company
- Architectural style: Cast concrete industrial
- MPS: White County MPS
- NRHP reference No.: 91001196
- Added to NRHP: September 13, 1991

The Doniphan Lumber Mill Historic District encompasses an early 20th-century lumber mill in Doniphan, Arkansas, on the eastern outskirts of Searcy. The district includes eight buildings, most built out of precast concrete, and Doniphan Lake. The mill was the first large-scale lumber-cutting operation in the county, and its presence was responsible for the growth and development of the community of Doniphan. The mill is the largest operation of its type in White County.

The district was listed on the National Register of Historic Places in 1991.

== See also ==
- National Register of Historic Places listings in White County, Arkansas
