= Mills House (Kensett, Arkansas) =

Historic house in Arkansas, United States

- U.S. National Register of Historic Places
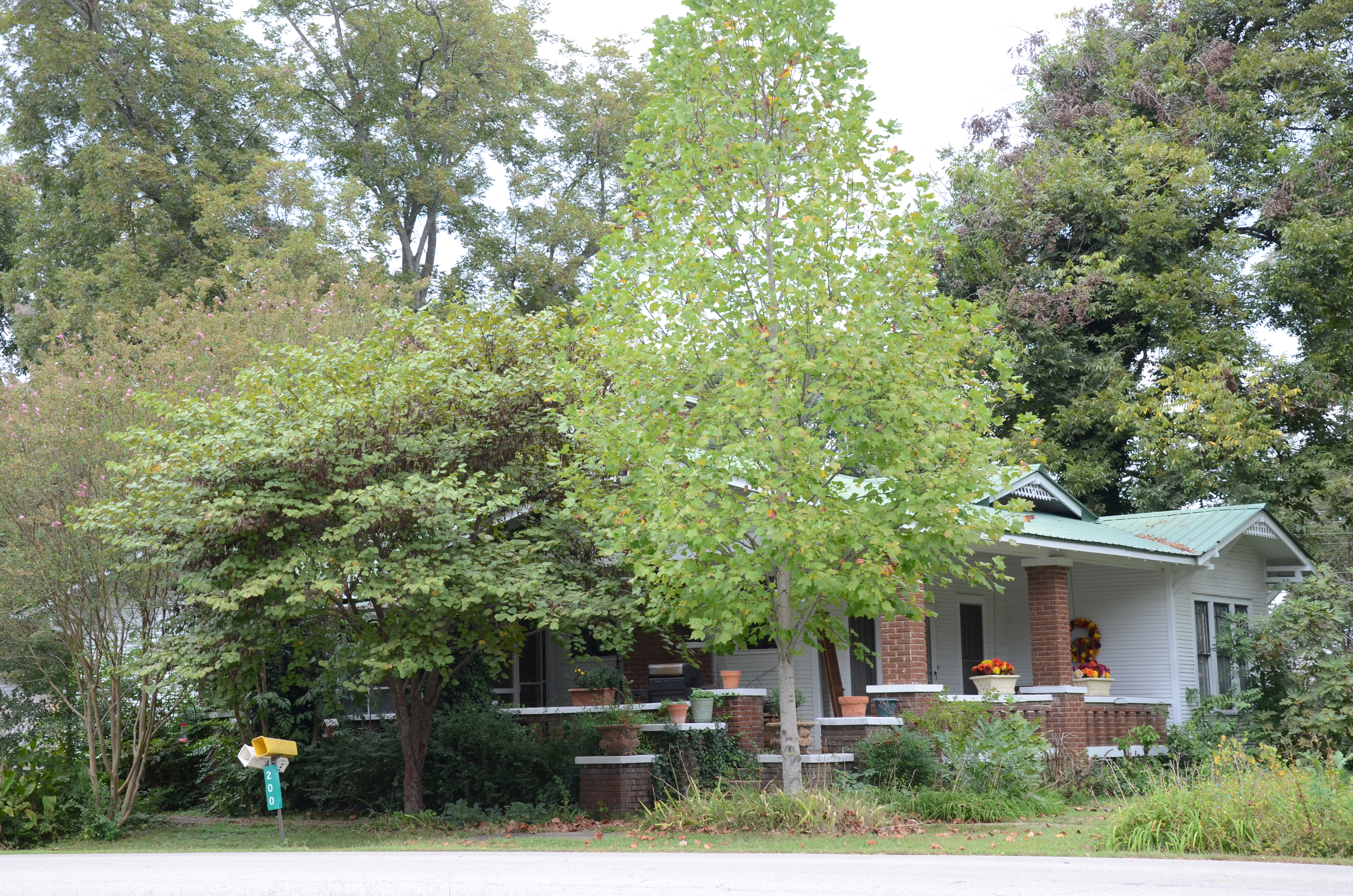

- Location within Arkansas Location within the United States
- Location: 200 W. Searcy St., Kensett, Arkansas
- Coordinates: 35°13′59″N 91°40′9″W
- Area: less than one acre
- Built: 1921
- Architectural style: Bungalow/craftsman
- MPS: White County MPS
- NRHP reference No.: 91001220
- Added to NRHP: September 5, 1991

The Mills House is a historic house at 200 West Searcy Street in Kensett, Arkansas. It is a 1 1/2-story wood-frame structure, with an irregular roof line, weatherboard siding, and a brick foundation and porch posts. The porch wraps around part of the front and side, and has a decorative brickwork balustrade. Built in 1921, it is one of Kensett's finest examples of Craftsman architecture.

The house was listed on the National Register of Historic Places in 1991.

== See also ==
- Wilbur D. Mills
- National Register of Historic Places listings in White County, Arkansas
