= Liberty School Cafeteria =

- U.S. National Register of Historic Places
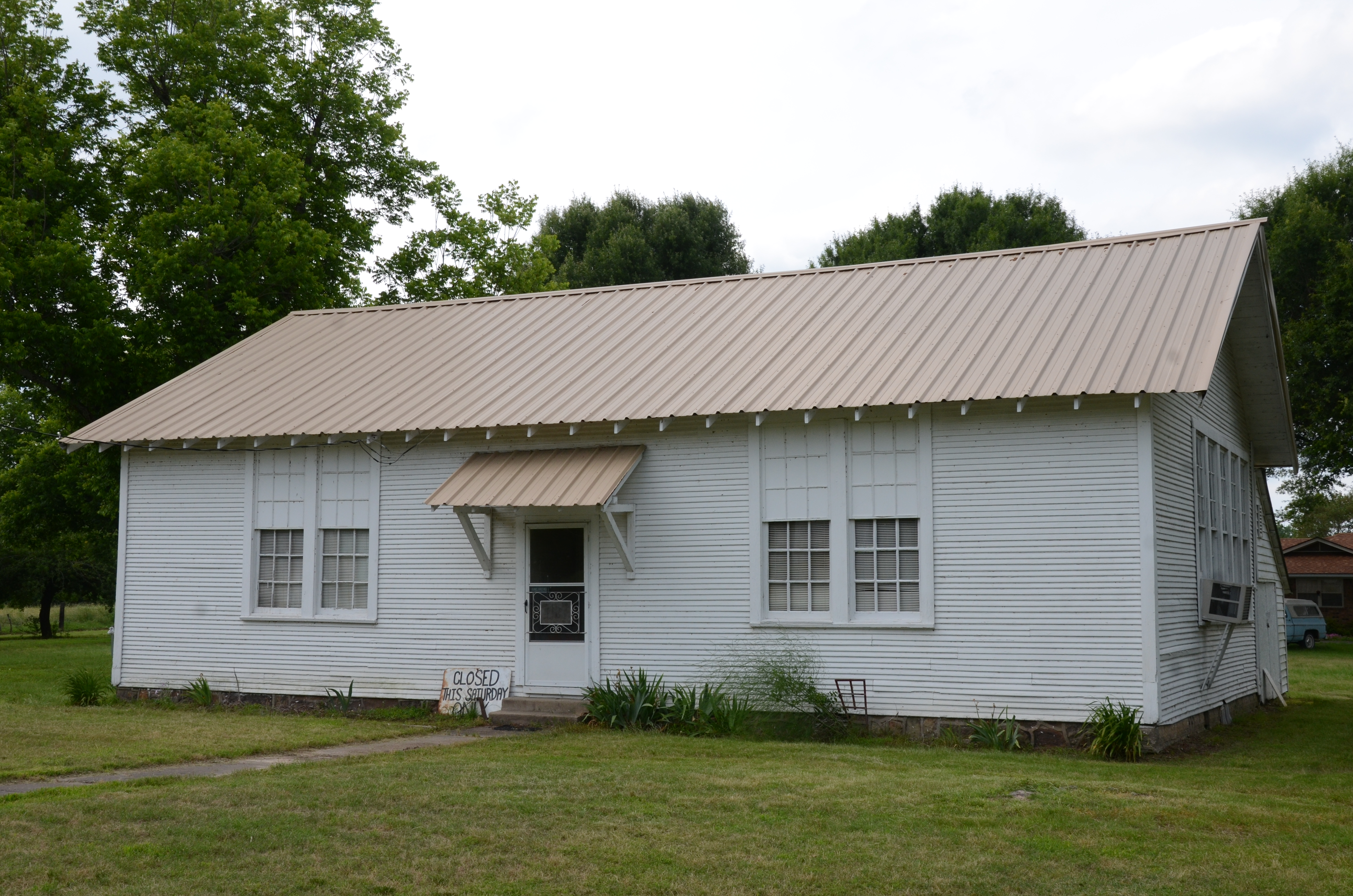

- Location within Arkansas Location within the United States
- Location: AR 36 N of jct. with US 64, Hamlet, Arkansas
- Coordinates: 35°4′53″N 92°18′21″W
- Area: less than one acre
- Built by: Works Progress Administration
- Architectural style: Bungalow/American craftsman, Plain Traditional
- MPS: Public Schools in the Ozarks MPS
- NRHP reference No.: 92001195
- Added to NRHP: September 10, 1992

The Liberty School Cafeteria is a historic school building in rural Faulkner County, Arkansas. It is located on the west side of Arkansas Highway 36, about 0.25 miles (0.40 km) north of its junction with United States Route 64, about midway between Conway and Vilonia. It is a modest single-story wood-frame structure, with a gabled roof that has exposed rafter ends in the American craftsman style. It was built in 1935 with funding support from the Works Progress Administration, and originally housed classrooms for science, agriculture and math, as part of a consolidated regional primary school. In the 1940s it was converted into a cafeteria. The school district was further consolidated with Vilonia in the 1950s and 1960s, when this building's school function ceased. The grounds are now used for a flea market.

The building was listed on the National Register of Historic Places in 1992.

== See also ==
- National Register of Historic Places listings in Faulkner County, Arkansas
