= Arkansas Highway 310 =

State highway in Arkansas, United States

Highway 310

Route information
- Maintained by ArDOT
- Length: 13.40 mi (21.57 km)

Section 1
- West end: AR 36 near Sidon
- East end: AR 16 near Albion

Section 2
- Length: 11.01 mi (17.72 km)
- East end: AR 5 in Romance
- West end: CR 310 (Clinton Mountain Road) near Holland

Location
- Country: United States
- State: Arkansas
- Counties: White, Cleburne Faulkner

Highway system
- Arkansas Highway System; Interstate; US; State; Business; Spurs; Suffixed; Scenic; Heritage
← AR 309	→ AR 311

Highway 310 (AR 310, Ark. 310, and Hwy. 310) is a designation for two state highways in Central Arkansas. One route of 13.40 miles (21.57 km) begins at Highway 36 and runs east to Highway 16. A second route of 11.01 miles (17.72 km) begins at Highway 5 and runs west to Faulkner County Route 310 (CR 310) Clinton Mountain Road west of Enola. (Note: Although Arkansas highways normally run from west to east, Highway 310 begins at Highway 5 and terminates at Clinton Mountain Road.) All routes are maintained by the Arkansas Department of Transportation (ArDOT).

== History ==
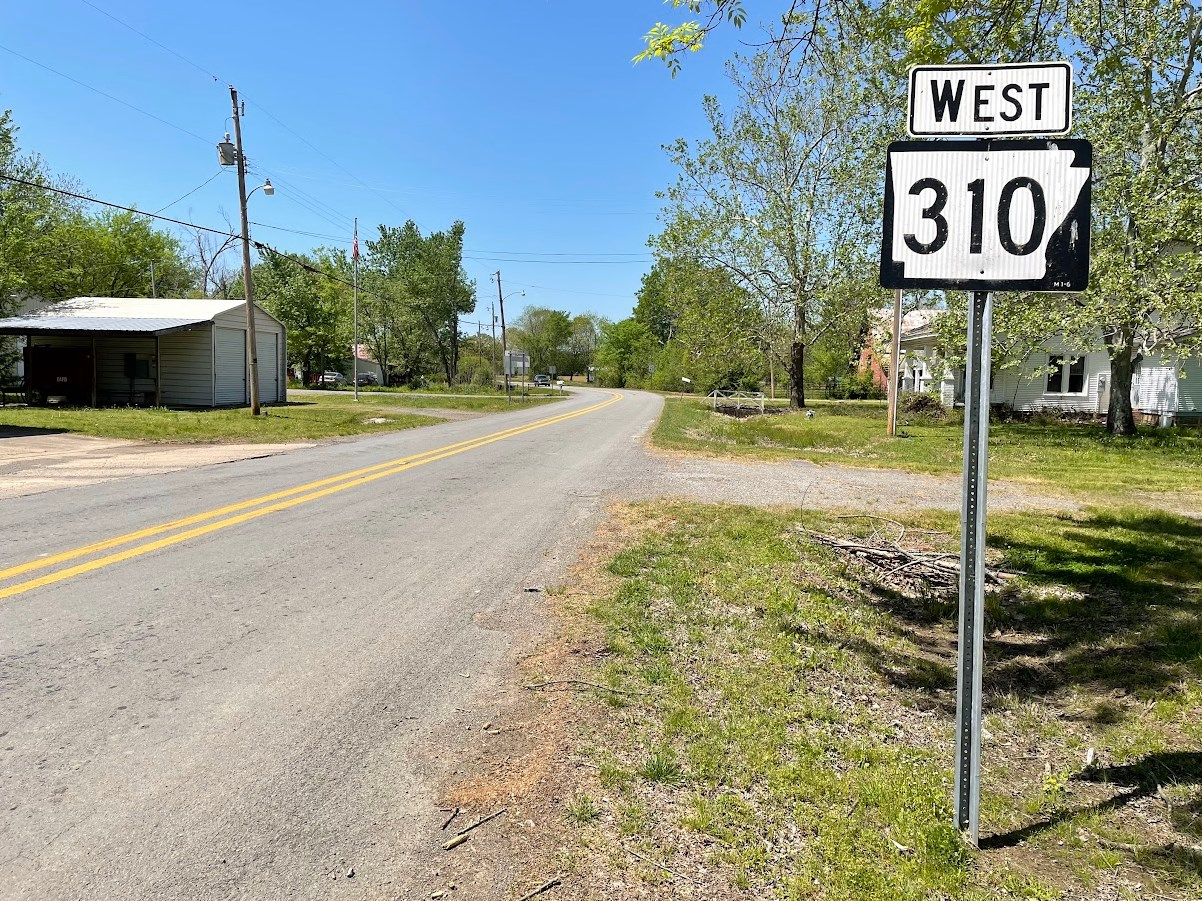
State Highway 310 in Enola, Arkansas looking west.

Highway 310 was created between Highway 36 and Sidon by the Arkansas State Highway Commission (ASHC) on November 23, 1966. The section between Highway 5 and the Faulkner County line was added to the state highway system by the ASHC on March 3, 1988.

In 1992, following the consolidation of the Enola and Mount Vernon school districts, the ASHC authorized AHTD to study if adding a road between the two communities would be feasible. The study resulted in adding the former White CR 67 between Enola and Mount Vernon to the state highway system as Highway 310. The resolution also authorized the decommissioning of a short segment of Highway 310 at Guy and Highway 287 near Greenbrier.

== Major intersections ==
County	Location	mi	km	Destinations	Notes
White		0.00	0.00	AR 36 – Heber Springs	Western terminus
Cleburne	No major junctions				
White		13.40	21.57	AR 16 – Searcy	Eastern terminus
White	Gap in route				
White		0.00	0.00	AR 5 – Heber Springs	Eastern terminus
Faulkner	Mount Vernon	3.16– 0.00	5.09– 0.00	AR 36 – Heber Springs, Vilonia	
Faulkner	Enola	3.9	6.3	AR 107	
Faulkner		7.85	12.63	CR 310 (Clinton Mountain Road)	Western terminus
1.000 mi = 1.609 km; 1.000 km = 0.621 mi: Concurrency terminus

== Former route ==
Highway 310
- Location: Guy - Greenbrier
- Existed: ?–2004
