= Blessing Farmstead =

Historic house in Arkansas, United States

- U.S. National Register of Historic Places
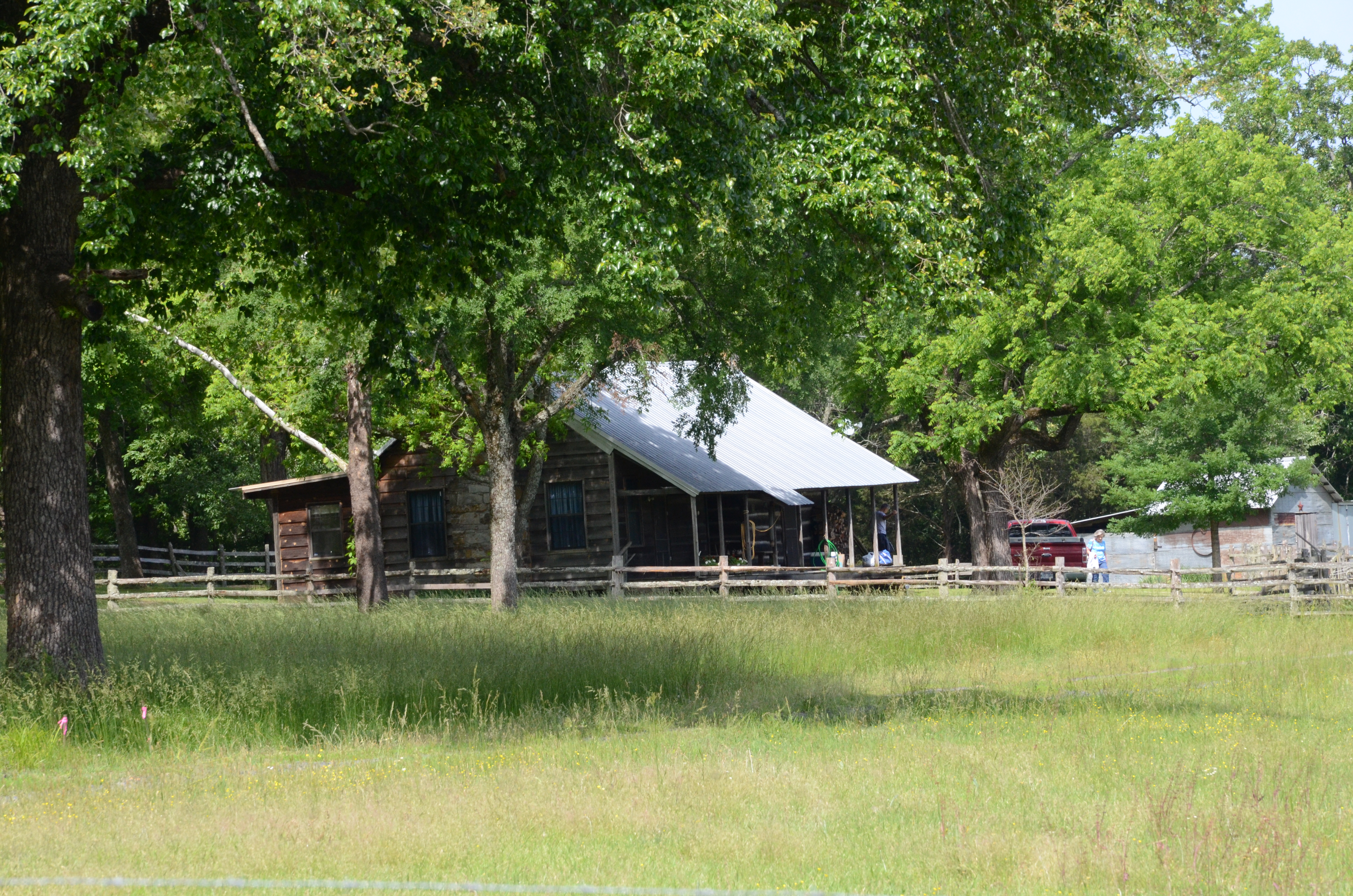

- Location within Arkansas Location within the United States
- Nearest city: Barney, Arkansas
- Coordinates: 35°15′07″N 92°14′28″W
- Area: 6 acres (2.4 ha)
- Built: 1900
- Built by: Andrew Jackson Blessing
- Architect: Andrew Jackson Blessing
- Architectural style: Dogtrot
- NRHP reference No.: 90001369
- Added to NRHP: September 5, 1990

The Blessing Homestead is a historic farmstead in rural northeastern Faulkner County, Arkansas. It is located overlooking the west bank of East Fork Cadron Creek, on Happy Valley Road east of County Road 225E, between McGintytown and Centerville. The central feature of the homestead is a dogtrot house, with one pen built of logs and the other of wood framing. The log pen was built about 1872, and typifies the evolutionary growth of these kinds of structures. It is the only remaining structure associated with the early history of Barney, most of which was wiped out by a tornado in 1915.

The property was listed on the National Register of Historic Places in 1990.

== Blessing family ==
Andrew Jackson Blessing and his wife, Martha Selby, were originally from Jackson County, Alabama, and came to Arkansas in 1865. They moved to this location in 1872 after completion of the log cabin and were some of the first to settle the town of Barney. Jonah Blessing, son of Andrew and Martha, inherited the farmstead and eventually passed it to his son, J. Milton Blessing. The property is no longer owned by the Blessing family.

== See also ==
- National Register of Historic Places listings in Faulkner County, Arkansas
