= Hamlet, Arkansas =

- Unincorporated community
- Location within Arkansas Location within the United States
- Coordinates: 35°04′41″N 92°18′19″W
- Country: United States
- State: Arkansas
- County: Faulkner
- Elevation: 295 ft (90 m)
- Time zone: UTC-6 (Central (CST))
  - Summer (DST): UTC-5 (CDT)
- Area code: 501
- GNIS feature ID: 77110

Hamlet is an unincorporated community in Faulkner County, Arkansas, United States. The community is located at the junction of U.S. Route 64 and Arkansas Highway 36, about halfway between Conway and Vilonia along the former.

The Liberty School Cafeteria, which is listed on the National Register of Historic Places, is near the community.
