= Garner, Arkansas =

- Town
- Location of Garner in White County, Arkansas.
- Coordinates: 35°08′32″N 91°46′50″W
- Country: United States
- State: Arkansas
- County: White

Area
  - Total: 0.84 sq mi (2.18 km^{2})
  - Land: 0.79 sq mi (2.04 km^{2})
  - Water: 0.054 sq mi (0.14 km^{2})
- Elevation: 213 ft (65 m)

Population (2020)
  - Total: 211
  - Estimate (2025): 211
  - Density: 267.3/sq mi (103.21/km^{2})
- Time zone: UTC-6 (Central (CST))
  - Summer (DST): UTC-5 (CDT)
- ZIP code: 72052
- Area code: 501
- FIPS code: 05-25900
- GNIS feature ID: 2406546

Garner is a town in White County, Arkansas, United States. As of the 2020 census, Garner had a population of 211.

== Geography ==
According to the United States Census Bureau, the town has a total area of 1.8 km^{2} (0.69 sq mi), of which 1.7 km^{2} (0.66 sq mi) is land and 0.1 km^{2} (0.039 sq mi) (7.14%) is water.

== Demographics ==
Historical population
Census	Pop.	Note	%±
1980	216		—
1990	191		−11.6%
2000	284		48.7%
2010	284		0.0%
2020	211		−25.7%
2025 (est.)	211		0.0%
U.S. Decennial Census; 2014 Estimate

As of the census of 2000, there were 284 people, 103 households, and 83 families residing in the town. The population density was 168.7 people /km^{2} (437 people/mi^{2}). There were 113 housing units at an average density of 67.1 units /km^{2} (174 units/mi^{2}). The racial makeup of the town was 95.07% White, 1.06% Black or African American, and 3.87% from two or more races. 1.06% of the population were Hispanic or Latino of any race.

There were 103 households, out of which 40.8% had children under the age of 18 living with them, 66.0% were married couples living together, 11.7% had a female householder with no husband present, and 19.4% were non-families. 18.4% of all households were made up of individuals, and 7.8% had someone living alone who was 65 years of age or older. The average household size was 2.76 and the average family size was 3.08.

In the town, the population was spread out, with 28.9% under the age of 18, 4.9% from 18 to 24, 33.1% from 25 to 44, 20.8% from 45 to 64, and 12.3% who were 65 years of age or older. The median age was 34 years. For every 100 females, there were 98.6 males. For every 100 females age 18 and over, there were 94.2 males.

The median income for a household in the town was $24,688, and the median income for a family was $28,393. Males had a median income of $24,375 versus $18,750 for females. The per capita income for the town was $11,015. About 12.3% of families and 19.2% of the population were below the poverty line, including 20.5% of those under the age of eighteen and 15.8% of those 65 or over.
