= Cadron Creek =

Stream in Arkansas, United States

Coordinates: 35.114807°N 92.553771°W

Cadron Creek is a stream in the U.S. state of Arkansas. It originates in central Cleburne County, southeast of Pearson and flows west-southwest past Quitman, where it enters Van Buren County briefly then into Faulkner County just north of the town of Guy. Past Twin Groves the stream turns more southerly. Downstream from Mallettown, the creek forms the boundary between Faulkner and Conway County. Ultimately it flows into the Arkansas River just west of the city of Conway. Interstate 40 crosses it at the lower reaches of the creek just above the confluence with the Arkansas River.

Cadron Creek most likely was named after Charles Cadron, a Canadian trader.

According to statistics from the USGS station at Guy, Arkansas, Cadron Creek's mean annual discharge is approximately 271 cubic feet per second. However, when combined with the discharge of one of its largest tributaries, East Fork Cadron Creek (measured at Enola, Arkansas), which flows downstream from Guy, its discharge is approximately 449 cubic feet per second.
