= Mount Vernon–Enola School District =

Public school district based in Mount Vernon, Arkansas

Location
- 38 Garland Springs Road; Mount Vernon, Arkansas 72111 United States

District information
- Grades: PK–12
- Superintendent: Zebulon Prothro
- Accreditation: ADE
- Schools: 2
- NCES District ID: 0510080

Students and staff
- Students: 506
- Teachers: 40.34 (on FTE basis)
- Staff: 91.34 (on FTE basis)
- Student–teacher ratio: 12.54
- Athletic conference: 2A 5 North (2012–14)
- District mascot: Warhawk
- Colors: Blue; Silver

Other information
- Website: www.mvewarhawks.org

Mount Vernon–Enola School District 19 (MVESD) is a public school district based in Mount Vernon, Arkansas. MVESD supports more than 500 students in kindergarten through grade 12 and employs more than 90 faculty and staff on a full time equivalent basis for its two schools.

The school district encompasses 106.61 square miles (276.1 km^{2}) of land, in Faulkner County and White County, and serves all of Mount Vernon and Enola as well as a small section of Holland.

== History ==
It was formed by the July 1, 1991 consolidation of the Enola School District and the Mount Vernon School District.

== Schools ==
The Mount Vernon/Enola School District and all of its schools are accredited by the Arkansas Department of Education (ADE) and AdvancED (formerly North Central Association).

Interscholastic athletic activities for the high school is administered by the Arkansas Activities Association. Mt Vernon-Enola is affiliated with the Conway Area Career Center to support the students' career and technical education needs.

Schools:

- Mount Vernon–Enola High School, located in Mount Vernon and serving grades 7 through 12.
- Mount Vernon–Enola Elementary School, located in Enola and serving prekindergarten through grade 6.
