= Searcy Public Schools =

School district in Arkansas, United States

Address
- 801 North Elm Street Searcy, Arkansas, 72143; United States

District information
- Type: Public
- Grades: K–12
- NCES District ID: 0512210

Students and staff
- Students: 3,947
- Teachers: 294.74
- Staff: 255.7
- Student–teacher ratio: 13.39

Other information
- Website: www.searcyschools.org

Searcy Public Schools is a school district in Searcy, White County, Arkansas, United States, which was established in 1870.

It serves most of Searcy and Higginson.

== Schools ==
Secondary schools

- Searcy High School, serving grades 9 through 12.
- James W. Ahlf Junior High School, serving grades 7 and 8.

Ełementary schools

- Southwest Middle School, serving grades 4, 5 and 6.
- McRae Elementary School, serving kindergarten through grade 3.
- Sidney Elementary School, serving kindergarten through grade 3.
- Westside Elementary School, serving kindergarten through grade 3.
