= Crow Lake (Arkansas) =

- Location within Arkansas
- Location: White County, Arkansas
- Coordinates: 35°05′41″N 91°30′15″W
- Type: lake
- Surface elevation: 187 feet (57 m)

Crow Lake is a former lake in White County, Arkansas. Crow Lake lay at an elevation of 187 feet (57 m).
