= Searcy High School =

Location
- 301 North Ella Street; Searcy, Arkansas 72143; United States; 35°15′8″N 91°45′32″W

Information
- Established: 1870 (156 years ago)
- Status: Open
- School board: Searcy School Board
- School district: Searcy School District
- NCES District ID: 0512210
- Oversight: Arkansas Department of Education (ADE)
- CEEB code: 042250
- NCES School ID: 051221000985
- Faculty: 73.00
- Grades: 9–12
- Enrollment: 1,208(2023-2024)
- Student to teacher ratio: 14.88
- Education system: ADE Smart Core curriculum
- Classes offered: Regular, Advanced Placement
- Campus type: Rural
- Colors: Red and black
- Athletics conference: 5A Central (2024-2026)
- Mascot: Lion
- Team name: Searcy Lions
- Accreditation: ADE; AdvancED (1924–)
- Feeder schools: James W. Ahlf Junior High School
- Affiliation: Arkansas Activities Association (AAA)
- Website: shs.searcyschools.org

Searcy High School (SHS) is a comprehensive public high school serving the community of Searcy, Arkansas, United States. Located in White County, Searcy High School is the sole high school managed by the Searcy School District and serves students in grades nine through twelve.

== History ==
The Searcy public school system was established in 1870. Searcy High School is a 1924 charter member of the North Central Association, now AdvancED.

== Curriculum ==
The assumed course of study at Searcy High School is the Smart Core curriculum developed by the Arkansas Department of Education (ADE). Searcy High School was first accredited by the North Central Association in 1924, followed by accreditation by AdvancED when the NCA unified with AdvancED starting in 2009–10. Students engage in regular and Advanced Placement (AP) coursework and exams to obtain at least 22 units before graduation. Exceptional students have been recognized as National Merit Finalists and participated in Arkansas Governor's School.

== Extracurricular activities ==
The Searcy High School mascot is the lion with red and black serving as the school colors. The Searcy Lions football team used to participate in the state's second largest classification (6A) within the combined 6A/7A East Conference, but will move to 5A classification for the 2024. Competition is primarily sanctioned by the Arkansas Activities Association (AAA) with the Lions competing in basketball (boys/girls), bowling, cheer, cross country, track, football, baseball, softball, golf (boys/girls), swimming (girls), tennis (boys/girls), and volleyball.

The Searcy Lions football team won the 6A state championship in 2019, making it the first time they've won state since 1933, although they appeared in and lost the 1985 championship game in a last second defeat.

The boys' cross-country team won seven consecutive state championships between 1966 and 1972. The boys' bowling team won the 7A/6A state championship in 2011. The girls' golf team has won six state titles between 1971 and 1994. The boys' soccer team captured six state titles including five consecutive state championships (2007–11, 2013) with the girls' soccer team also winning 6 state titles (2007, 2008, 2010, 2013, 2021, 2022).

== Notable alumni ==
- Bill Dickey—professional baseball player and manager; member of the National Baseball Hall of Fame.
- Wilbur Mills (1926)—class valedictorian; member of the U.S. House of Representatives from Arkansas's 2nd congressional district (1939–1977).
- Weston Dacus (2004)—United Football League professional football player.
