= Russell, Arkansas =

- Town
- Location of Russell in White County, Arkansas.
- Coordinates: 35°21′44″N 91°30′36″W
- Country: United States
- State: Arkansas
- County: White

Area
  - Total: 0.21 sq mi (0.54 km^{2})
  - Land: 0.21 sq mi (0.54 km^{2})
  - Water: 0 sq mi (0.00 km^{2})
- Elevation: 236 ft (72 m)

Population (2020)
  - Total: 184
  - Estimate (2025): 184
  - Density: 886.0/sq mi (342.08/km^{2})
- Time zone: UTC-6 (Central (CST))
  - Summer (DST): UTC-5 (CDT)
- ZIP code: 72139
- Area code: 501
- FIPS code: 05-61640
- GNIS feature ID: 2407258
- Website: russell-ar.gov

Russell is a town in White County, Arkansas, United States. As of the 2020 census, Russell had a population of 184.

== Geography ==
According to the United States Census Bureau, the town has a total area of 0.5 km^{2} (0.2 mi^{2}), all land.

== Demographics ==
Historical population
Census	Pop.	Note	%±
1900	200		—
1910	147		−26.5%
1920	172		17.0%
1930	174		1.2%
1940	206		18.4%
1950	241		17.0%
1960	203		−15.8%
1970	231		13.8%
1980	232		0.4%
1990	180		−22.4%
2000	228		26.7%
2010	216		−5.3%
2020	184		−14.8%
2025 (est.)	184	▲	0.0%
U.S. Decennial Census

As of the census of 2000, there were 228 people, 103 households, and 64 families residing in the town. The population density was 419.2/km^{2} (1,102.9/mi^{2}). There were 116 housing units at an average density of 213.3/km^{2} (561.1/mi^{2}). The racial makeup of the town was 99.56% White and 0.44% Native American. 1.32% of the population were Hispanic or Latino of any race.

There were 103 households, out of which 29.1% had children under the age of 18 living with them, 44.7% were married couples living together, 15.5% had a female householder with no husband present, and 36.9% were non-families. 34.0% of all households were made up of individuals, and 12.6% had someone living alone who was 65 years of age or older. The average household size was 2.21 and the average family size was 2.83.

In the town, the population was spread out, with 26.8% under the age of 18, 5.7% from 18 to 24, 24.1% from 25 to 44, 29.4% from 45 to 64, and 14.0% who were 65 years of age or older. The median age was 40 years. For every 100 females, there were 82.4 males. For every 100 females age 18 and over, there were 81.5 males.

The median income for a household in the town was $20,208, and the median income for a family was $26,250. Males had a median income of $26,875 versus $26,042 for females. The per capita income for the town was $12,032. About 20.0% of families and 23.3% of the population were below the poverty line, including 32.3% of those under the age of eighteen and 15.0% of those 65 or over.
