= Crow Lake (Cook County, Minnesota) =

Lake in the state of Minnesota, United States

- Location within Minnesota
- Location: West Cook, Cook County, Minnesota
- Coordinates: 47°54′46″N 90°35′33″W
- Basin countries: United States
- Surface elevation: 1,850 ft (560 m)

Crow Lake is a lake in Cook County, Minnesota. Crow Lake lies at an elevation of 1850 feet (564 m).
