= Mount Vernon–Enola High School =

Location
- 38 Garland Springs Road; Mount Vernon, Arkansas 72111; United States; 35°13′34″N 92°7′54″W

Information
- School type: Comprehensive
- School district: Mount Vernon–Enola School District
- NCES District ID: 0510080
- CEEB code: 041780
- NCES School ID: 051008000739
- Teaching staff: 21.73 (on FTE basis)
- Grades: 7–12
- Enrollment: 250 (2023–2024)
- Student to teacher ratio: 11.50
- Colors: Blue and silver
- Athletics conference: 1A 5 North (2012–14)
- Mascot: Warhawk
- Team name: Mount Vernon–Enola Warhawks
- Website: www.mvewarhawks.org/o/mvehs

Mount Vernon–Enola High School (MVE) is a comprehensive six-year public high school in Mount Vernon, Arkansas, United States. It is one of six public high schools located in Faulkner County and is the sole high school administered by Mount Vernon–Enola School District serving grades 7 through 12.

== History ==
In 1991, the Mount Vernon and Enola school districts consolidated to form the Mount Vernon–Enola School District. The Enola School became Mount Vernon/Enola Elementary, which serves kindergarten through sixth-grade students. Mount Vernon–Enola High School was originally constructed in 1937, with additions in 1973, 1983, and 1986.

== Academics ==
The assumed course of study follows the Smart Core curriculum developed by the Arkansas Department of Education (ADE), which requires students to complete at least 22 units prior to graduation. Students complete regular (core and career focus) classes and exams and may select Advanced Placement (AP) coursework and exams that may result in college credit. MVE High School is accredited by the ADE. Mount Vernon–Enola is a member of the Arch Ford Education Service Cooperative, which provides career and technical education programs.

== Athletics ==
The Mount Vernon–Enola mascot and athletic emblem is the Warhawk with blue and silver serving as its school colors.

The Mount Vernon–Enola Warhawks compete in the state's smallest classification—1A Classification administered by the Arkansas Activities Association. For 2012–14, the Warhawks competes in the 1A Region 5 North Conference. MVE provides teams in volleyball, golf (boys/girls), basketball (boys/girls), baseball, softball, and track and field (boys/girls).

- Baseball: The Warhawks baseball squad has won one state baseball championship in 1995.

== Notable people ==
The following are notable people associated with Mount Vernon–Enola High School or its predecessor schools. If the person was a Mount Vernon–Enola High School student, the number in parentheses indicates the year of graduation; if the person was a faculty or staff member, that person's title and years of association are included:
