= Georgetown, Arkansas =

- Town
- Location of Georgetown in White County, Arkansas.
- Coordinates: 35°07′30″N 91°27′14″W
- Country: United States
- State: Arkansas
- County: White
- Founded: 1789
- Incorporated: 1986

Government
  - Mayor: Rickie Stephenson

Area
  - Total: 0.29 sq mi (0.75 km^{2})
  - Land: 0.29 sq mi (0.75 km^{2})
  - Water: 0 sq mi (0.00 km^{2})
- Elevation: 203 ft (62 m)

Population (2020)
  - Total: 81
  - Estimate (2025): 87 ▲
  - Density: 280.5/sq mi (108.31/km^{2})
- Time zone: UTC-6 (CST)
  - Summer (DST): UTC-5 (CDT)
- ZIP code: 72143
- Area code: 501
- FIPS code: 05-26440
- GNIS feature ID: 2406558

Georgetown is a town in southeastern White County, Arkansas, United States, overlooking the White River. As of the 2020 census, Georgetown had a population of 81. First settled in 1789 before the Louisiana Purchase, the community is the oldest continuously settled area in Arkansas.

== History ==
The settlement of Arkansas Post, which began in 1686, came more than a century earlier, though that community dissolved in the years following the American Civil War. The state's next oldest community after Georgetown — Batesville — was founded approximately 21 years later.

In 1945, the White River flooded its banks in Georgetown. The disaster contributed to the demise the next year of the Missouri and North Arkansas Railroad, which had provided passenger and freight service since 1906 from Joplin, Missouri, to Helena, Arkansas.

The population of Georgetown was 126 at the 2000 census.

== Geography ==
According to the United States Census Bureau, the town has a total area of 0.7 km^{2} (0.27 sq mi), all land.

== Demographics ==
Historical population
Census	Pop.	Note	%±
1880	92		—
1990	126		—
2000	126		0.0%
2010	124		−1.6%
2020	81		−34.7%
2025 (est.)	87	▲	7.4%
U.S. Decennial Census; 2014 Estimate

As of the census of 2000, there were 126 people, 55 households, and 33 families residing in the town. The population density was 180.2 people/km^{2} (467 people/mi^{2}). There were 71 housing units at an average density of 101.5 units/km^{2} (263 units/mi^{2}). The racial makeup of the town was 96.83% White and 3.17% Black or African American. Hispanic or Latino of any race were 0.79% of the population.

There were 55 households, out of which 21.8% had children under the age of 18 living with them, 49.1% were married couples living together, 5.5% had a female householder with no husband present, and 38.2% were non-families. 34.5% of all households were made up of individuals, and 16.4% had someone living alone who was 65 years of age or older. The average household size was 2.29 and the average family size was 2.94.

In the town, the population was spread out, with 24.6% under the age of 18, 4.0% from 18 to 24, 24.6% from 25 to 44, 23.8% from 45 to 64, and 23.0% who were 65 years of age or older. The median age was 43 years. For every 100 females, there were 110.0 males. For every 100 females age 18 and over, there were 97.9 males.

The median income for a household in the town was $12,500, and the median income for a family was $25,357. Males had a median income of $22,500 versus $15,625 for females. The per capita income for the town was $8,283. There were 25.0% of families and 38.0% of the population living below the poverty line, including 50.0% of those under 18 and 37.1% of those over 64.
