= Arkansas Highway 107 =

State highway in Arkansas, United States

Highway 107

Route information
- Maintained by ArDOT

Section 1
- Length: 33.2 mi (53.4 km)
- South end: AR 36 near Holland
- North end: AR 110 in Heber Springs

Section 2
- Length: 22.8 mi (36.7 km)
- South end: I-30 / I-40 / US 65 / US 67 / US 167 / Main Street in North Little Rock
- North end: US 64 in Vilonia

Location
- Country: United States
- State: Arkansas

Highway system
- Arkansas Highway System; Interstate; US; State; Business; Spurs; Suffixed; Scenic; Heritage
← AR 106	→ AR 108

Arkansas Highway 107 (AR 107) is a designation for two state highways in Arkansas.

== Section 1 ==
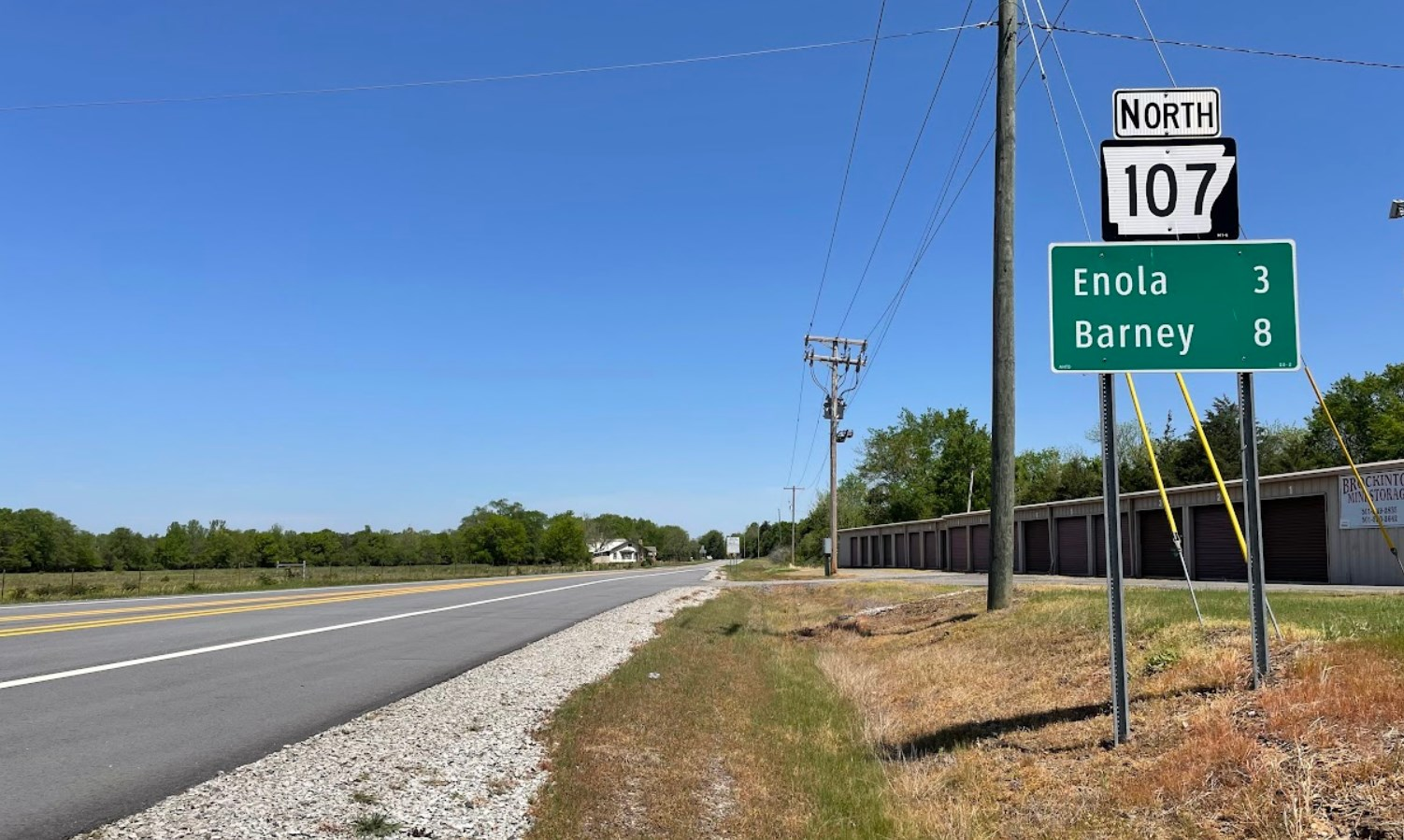
Southern terminus of the northern section of Highway 107 south of Enola, Arkansas.

Arkansas Highway 107 is a state highway of 33.2 miles (53.4 km) that runs in Faulkner and Cleburne counties.

=== Route description ===
Highway 107 begins at Highway 36 near Holland. The route runs north to meet Highway 25 and Highway 225 before entering Quitman and Cleburne County. In Quitman, Highway 25 also meets Highway 124, which it follows east out of town. After breaking north, Highway 107 reunites with Highway 25 north to an area just south of Heber Springs. Highway 107 ends at Highway 110 in Heber Springs. Highway 107 has 16.2 miles (26.1 km) in Faulkner County and 17.0 miles (27.4 km) in Cleburne County.

=== Major intersections ===
County	Location	mi	km	Destinations	Notes
Faulkner		0.0	0.0	AR 36 to AR 287 – Mount Vernon, Rose Bud	Southern terminus
Faulkner	Enola	2.9	4.7	AR 310	
Faulkner		11.9	19.2	AR 225 south – Greenbrier	Northern terminus of AR 225
Faulkner	Quitman	16.1	25.9	AR 25 south – Greenbrier	Southern end of AR 25 concurrency
Cleburne	Quitman	17.5	28.2	AR 124 west – Gravesville	Southern end of AR 124 concurrency
Cleburne	Quitman	17.9	28.8	AR 356 west to AR 225 – Greers Ferry	Eastern terminus of AR 356
Cleburne	Quitman	18.1	29.1	AR 25 north – Heber Springs	Northern end of AR 25 concurrency
Cleburne		23.0	37.0	AR 124 south – Rose Bud	Northern end of AR 124 concurrency
Cleburne		27.3	43.9	AR 25 south – Quitman	Southern end of AR 25 concurrency
Cleburne		28.3	45.5	AR 16 west – Pearson, Greers Ferry	Southern end of AR 16 concurrency
Cleburne		29.6	47.6	AR 16 east / AR 25 north – Heber Springs	Northern end of AR 16/AR 25 concurrency
Cleburne	Heber Springs	33.2	53.4	AR 110 – Eden Isle, Heber Springs, Heber Springs Park	Northern terminus
1.000 mi = 1.609 km; 1.000 km = 0.621 mi: Concurrency terminus

== Section 2 ==
Arkansas Highway 107 is a state highway of 18.7 miles (30.1 km) that runs in Pulaski and Faulkner counties.

=== Route description ===
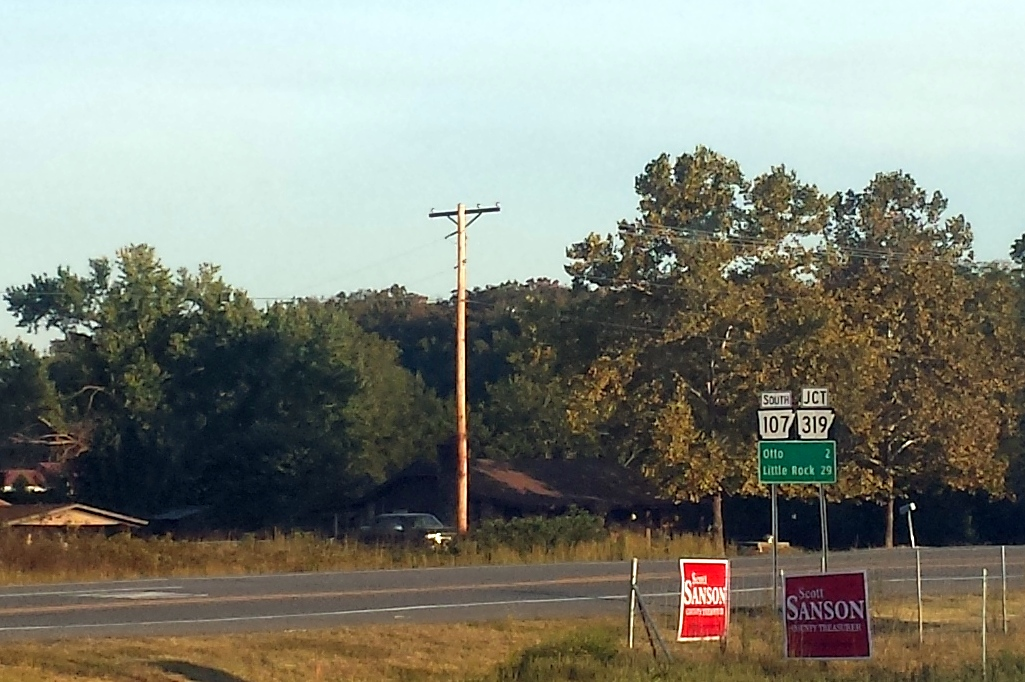
Highway 107 near Vilonia

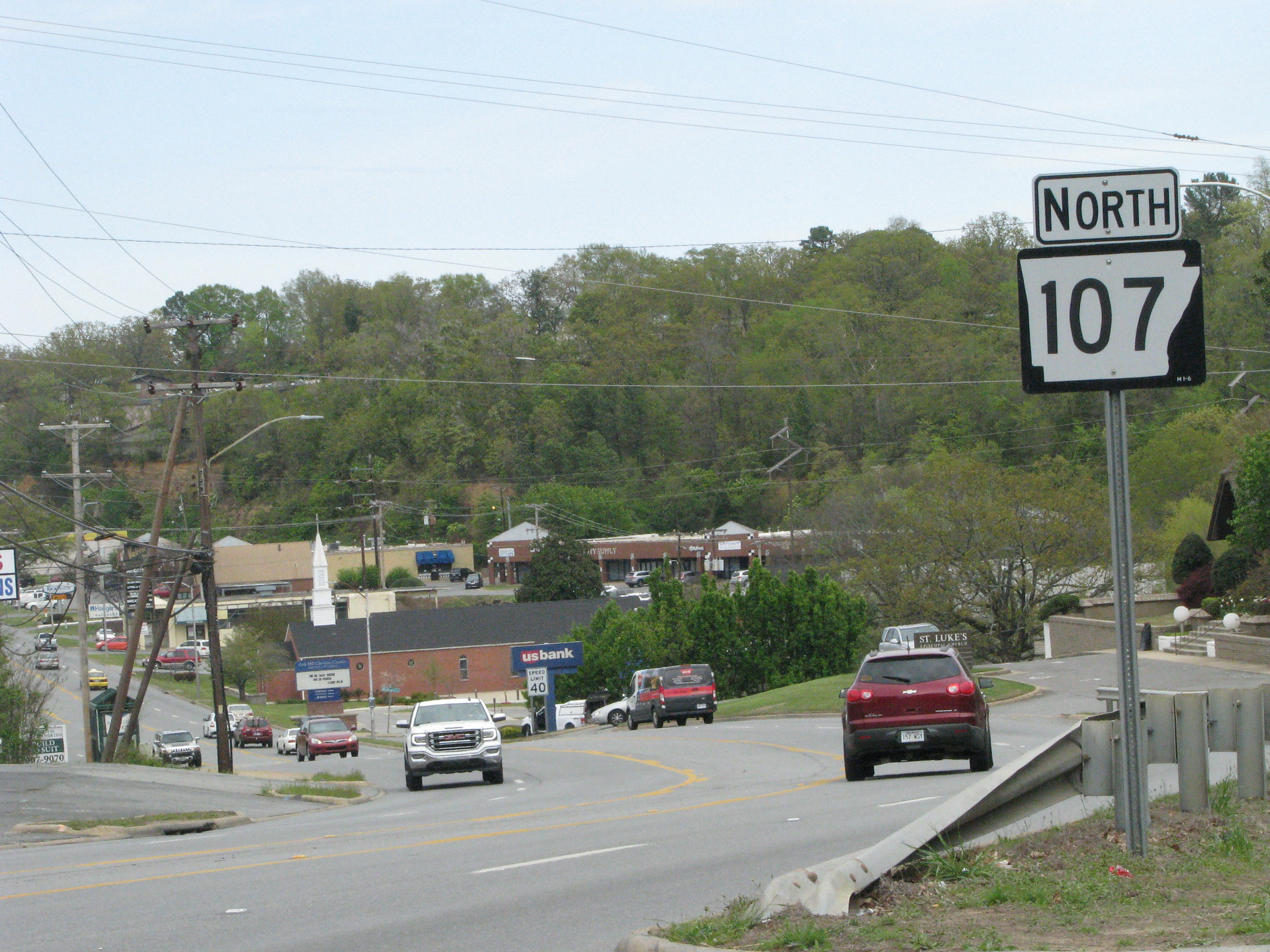
Highway 107 in North Little Rock

Highway 107 begins at I-30 and I-40 in North Little Rock as a continuation of Main Street and runs through some suburbs until entering Faulkner County. The route runs north to terminate at U.S. Route 64B (US 64B) in Vilonia. Highway 107 has 16.4 miles (26.4 km) in Pulaski County and 6.4 miles (10.3 km) in Faulkner County.

=== Major intersections ===
County	Location	mi	km	Destinations	Notes
Pulaski	North Little Rock	0.0	0.0	Main Street / Pershing Boulevard	Southern terminus
Pulaski	North Little Rock	0.1	0.16	I-30 west / I-40 (US 65 / US 67 / US 167) – Memphis, Fort Smith	No northbound access to I-30/I-40 east; eastern terminus and exit 143A on I-30; exit 153A on I-40
Pulaski	Sherwood	4.6	7.4	AR 176 east (Kiehl Avenue)	Western terminus of AR 176
Pulaski		15.2	24.5	To AR 89 north	Access via CR 89
Pulaski	Zion Hill	18.6	29.9	AR 89 south – Cabot	Northern terminus of AR 89
Faulkner	Funston	20.7	33.3	AR 319 east – Ward	Western terminus of AR 319
Faulkner	Vilonia	22.8	36.7	US 64 – Conway, El Paso	
Faulkner	Vilonia	24.6	39.6	US 64B – Conway, Beebe	Northern terminus
1.000 mi = 1.609 km; 1.000 km = 0.621 mi: Incomplete access

== See also ==
- List of state highways in Arkansas
