= Bald Knob National Wildlife Refuge =

Wildlife refuge located in White County, Arkansas

- IUCN category IV (habitat/species management area)
- Location within Arkansas Location within the United States
- Location: White County, Arkansas, United States
- Nearest city: Bald Knob, Arkansas
- Coordinates: 35°14′30″N 91°34′30″W
- Area: 15,022 acres (60.79 km^{2})
- Established: 1993
- Governing body: U.S. Fish and Wildlife Service
- Website: Bald Knob National Wildlife Refuge

The Bald Knob National Wildlife Refuge is a 15,022 acres (60.79 km^{2}) (2014) wildlife refuge located in White County, Arkansas about two miles south of the town of Bald Knob. The refuge is managed by the United States Fish and Wildlife Service. The refuge features large numbers of migratory waterfowl and bald eagles during the winter months.

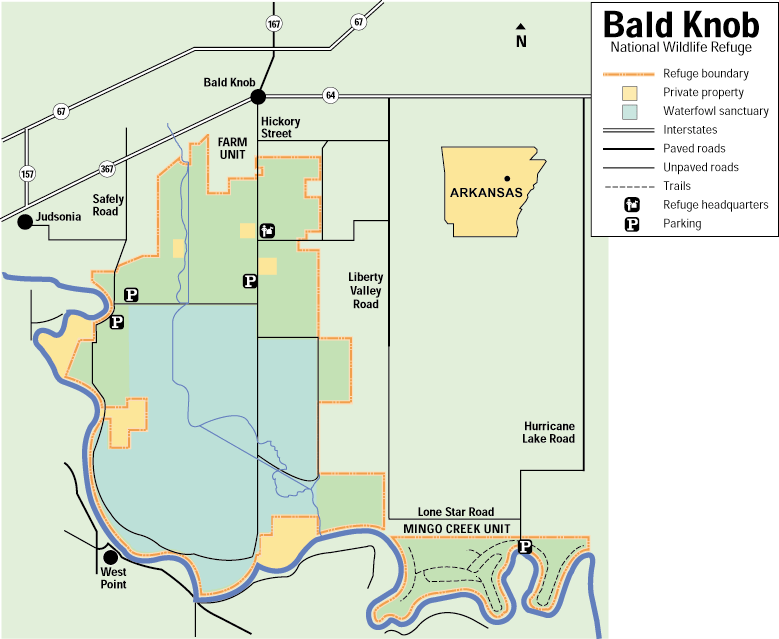
A map of Bald Knob National Wildlife Refuge in Arkansas.

The Bald Knob National Wildlife Refuge was established in 1993 when the U.S. government purchased a large rice farm from the John Hancock Insurance Company. The refuge consists of 4,522 acres (18.30 km^{2}) acres of agricultural land, 4,201 acres (17.00 km^{2}) of bottomland hardwood forest including wetland sloughs and oxbow lakes, 6,188 acres (25.04 km^{2}) of land being reforested, and 111 acres (0.45 km^{2}) of roads, levees, and other man-made facilities. The refuge is bordered on the south by the Little Red River. Bald Knob NWR is near the 17,000 acres (69 km^{2}) Henry Gray/Hurricane Lake State Wildlife Management Area

== Wildlife ==
The refuge provides a protected habitat for migratory waterfowl, other birds, and endangered species 12,900 acres of the refuge is a former rice farm with extensive irrigation systems This is used to grow rice, soybeans, maize, and millet with emphasis on providing food and habitat for migratory waterfowl. The irrigation system is also utilized to provide habitat for wading birds, mudflats for shorebirds, and to simulate natural flooding of hardwood forests.

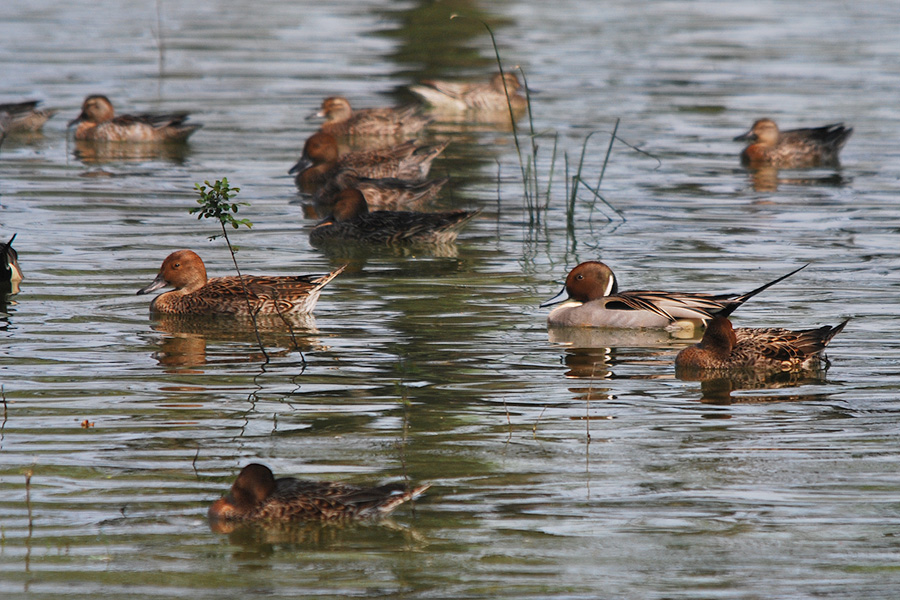
The refuge hosts the largest concentration of wintering pintail ducks in Arkansas.

Bald Knob National Wildlife Refuge is part of the most important wintering area for ducks in North America. It is especially important as a wintering and stopover point for migrating pintail ducks of which more than 200,000 have been recorded on a single day. Bald Knob hosts the largest winter population of pintails in Arkansas. Other winter waterfowl species include mallards, blue-winged teal, wood ducks, Canada geese and white-fronted and lesser snow geese. Agricultural land, river sloughs and brakes, bottomland hardwoods and fallow fields provide a diverse habitat that nurtures wintering waterfowl. Bald eagles are common during winter months. Bird watching is popular. Hunting for ducks and geese is permitted under regulation by the refuge. White-tailed deer, rabbit, and squirrel may be hunted in the reforestation areas. Access to most of the refuge is by all-terrain vehicle trails or on foot. Other mammal species that inhabit this refuge are raccoon, bobcat, coyote, river otter and beaver.

The refuge attracts 40,000 visitors per year (2014). Only day use is permitted. Some areas are closed to visitors to protect wildlife and habitat.
