= West Point, Arkansas =

- Town
- Location of West Point in White County, Arkansas.
- Coordinates: 35°12′12″N 91°36′36″W
- Country: United States
- State: Arkansas
- County: White

Area
  - Total: 0.43 sq mi (1.11 km^{2})
  - Land: 0.43 sq mi (1.11 km^{2})
  - Water: 0 sq mi (0.00 km^{2})
- Elevation: 220 ft (67 m)

Population (2020)
  - Total: 170
  - Estimate (2025): 173 ▲
  - Density: 395.4/sq mi (152.67/km^{2})
- Time zone: UTC-6 (Central (CST))
  - Summer (DST): UTC-5 (CDT)
- ZIP code: 72178
- Area code: 501
- FIPS code: 05-74660
- GNIS feature ID: 2406866

West Point is a town in White County, Arkansas, United States. As of the 2020 census, West Point had a population of 170.

== Geography ==
West Point is located along the Little Red River.

According to the United States Census Bureau, the town has a total area of 1.0 km^{2} (0.4 mi^{2}), all land.

== Demographics ==
Historical population
Census	Pop.	Note	%±
1880	123		—
1900	111		—
1910	116		4.5%
1920	162		39.7%
1930	166		2.5%
1940	145		−12.7%
1950	115		−20.7%
1960	97		−15.7%
1970	184		89.7%
1980	226		22.8%
1990	146		−35.4%
2000	164		12.3%
2010	185		12.8%
2020	170		−8.1%
2025 (est.)	173	▲	1.8%
U.S. Decennial Census

As of the census of 2000, there were 164 people, 65 households, and 44 families residing in the town. The population density was 158.3/km^{2} (411.9/mi^{2}). There were 68 housing units at an average density of 65.6/km^{2} (170.8/mi^{2}). The racial makeup of the town was 91.46% White, 3.66% Black or African American, 0.61% Pacific Islander, and 4.27% from two or more races. 6.10% of the population were Hispanic or Latino of any race.

There were 65 households, out of which 32.3% had children under the age of 18 living with them, 52.3% were married couples living together, 15.4% had a female householder with no husband present, and 32.3% were non-families. 26.2% of all households were made up of individuals, and 7.7% had someone living alone who was 65 years of age or older. The average household size was 2.52 and the average family size was 3.14.

In the town, the population was spread out, with 24.4% under the age of 18, 15.2% from 18 to 24, 29.9% from 25 to 44, 16.5% from 45 to 64, and 14.0% who were 65 years of age or older. The median age was 31 years. For every 100 females, there were 95.2 males. For every 100 females age 18 and over, there were 96.8 males.

The median income for a household in the town was $23,125, and the median income for a family was $24,375. Males had a median income of $20,208 versus $23,333 for females. The per capita income for the town was $11,657. About 26.1% of families and 26.1% of the population were below the poverty line, including 42.1% of those under the age of 18 and 33.3% of those 65 or over.
