= Enola, Arkansas =

- Town
- Location of Enola in Faulkner County, Arkansas.
- Coordinates: 35°11′37″N 92°12′14″W
- Country: United States
- State: Arkansas
- County: Faulkner

Area
  - Total: 2.71 sq mi (7.03 km^{2})
  - Land: 2.71 sq mi (7.03 km^{2})
  - Water: 0 sq mi (0.00 km^{2})
- Elevation: 325 ft (99 m)

Population (2020)
  - Total: 318
  - Estimate (2025): 334 ▲
  - Density: 117.1/sq mi (45.23/km^{2})
- Time zone: UTC-6 (Central (CST))
  - Summer (DST): UTC-5 (CDT)
- ZIP code: 72047
- Area code: 501
- FIPS code: 05-21820
- GNIS feature ID: 2406453

Enola is a town in Faulkner County, Arkansas, United States. It is part of the Central Arkansas region. The population was 318 at the 2020 census.

== Geography ==
Enola is located in eastern Faulkner County 19 miles (31 km) northeast of Conway, the county seat. Arkansas Highway 107 passes through the center of the town, leading north 18 miles (29 km) to Quitman and southwest 2.5 miles (4.0 km) to Arkansas Highway 36.

According to the United States Census Bureau, Enola has a total area of 18 square kilometres (7.0 sq mi), all land.

== Demographics ==
Historical population
| Census | Pop. | Note | %± |
|---|---|---|---|
| 1970 | 173 | | — |
| 1980 | 186 | | 7.5% |
| 1990 | 179 | | −3.8% |
| 2000 | 188 | | 5.0% |
| 2010 | 338 | | 79.8% |
| 2020 | 318 | | −5.9% |
| 2025 (est.) | 334 | ▲ | 5.0% |
U.S. Decennial Census; 2015 Estimate

As of the census of 2010, there were 338 people, and as of 2000, 72 households, and 58 families residing in the town. The population density was 47.8 people/km^{2} (124 people/mi^{2}). There were 79 housing units at an average density of 20.1 units/km^{2} (52 units/mi^{2}). The racial makeup of the town was 99.47% White, 0.53% from other races. 1.06% of the population were Hispanic or Latino of any race.

There were 72 households, out of which 34.7% had children under the age of 18 living with them, 68.1% were married couples living together, 12.5% had a female householder with no husband present, and 18.1% were non-families. 16.7% of all households were made up of individuals, and 11.1% had someone living alone who was 65 years of age or older. The average household size was 2.61 and the average family size was 2.86.

In the town, the population was spread out, with 24.5% under the age of 18, 4.8% from 18 to 24, 23.9% from 25 to 44, 25.0% from 45 to 64, and 21.8% who were 65 years of age or older. The median age was 42 years. For every 100 females, there were 88.0 males. For every 100 females age 18 and over, there were 89.3 males.

The median income for a household in the town was $40,139, and the median income for a family was $41,591. Males had a median income of $32,083 versus $28,750 for females. The per capita income for the town was $20,685. About 10.9% of families and 11.8% of the population were below the poverty line, including 16.7% of those under the age of eighteen and 17.9% of those 65 or over.

== Education ==
Public education for elementary and secondary school students is provided by the Mount Vernon–Enola School District, which leads to graduation from Mount Vernon–Enola High School. The district's elementary school is based in Enola. The district was formed by the July 1, 1991, consolidation of the Enola School District and the Mount Vernon School District.
