= White County, Arkansas =

County in Arkansas, United States

- County
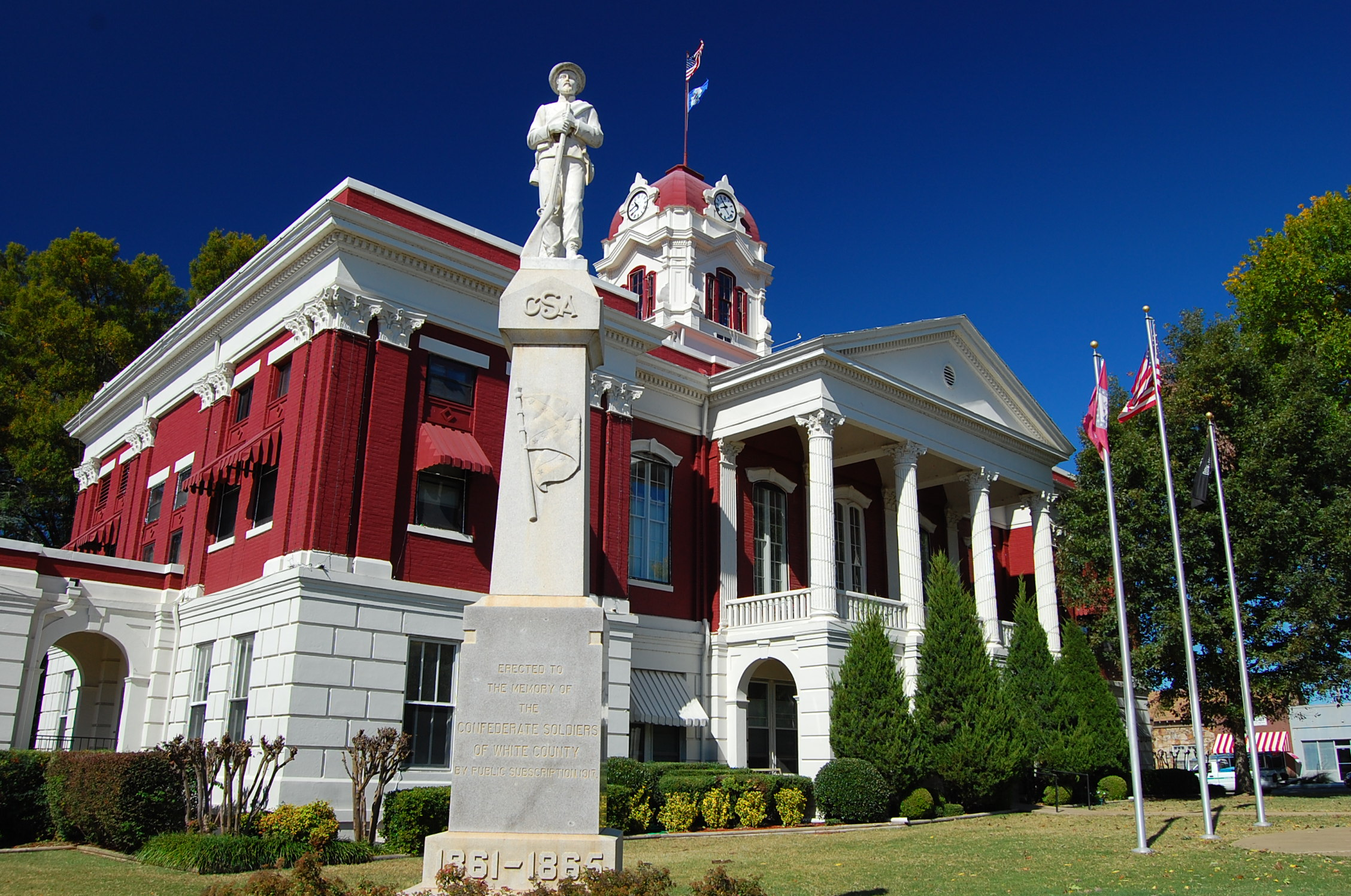
- White County Courthouse and Confederate monument in Searcy

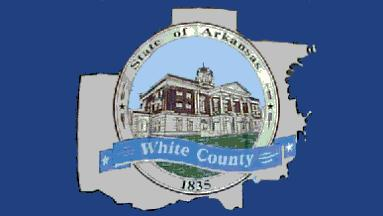
- Flag Seal

- Location within the U.S. state of Arkansas
- Coordinates: 35°15′21″N 91°44′05″W
- Country: United States
- State: Arkansas
- Founded: October 23, 1835
- Named for: Hugh Lawson White
- Seat: Searcy
- Largest city: Searcy

Area
  - Total: 1,042 sq mi (2,700 km^{2})
  - Land: 1,035 sq mi (2,680 km^{2})
  - Water: 7.1 sq mi (18 km^{2}) 0.7%

Population (2020)
  - Total: 76,822
  - Estimate (2025): 80,085 ▲
  - Density: 74.22/sq mi (28.66/km^{2})
- Time zone: UTC−6 (Central)
  - Summer (DST): UTC−5 (CDT)
- Congressional district: 2nd
- Website: whitecounty.ar.gov

White County is a county located in the U.S. state of Arkansas. As of the 2020 census, the population was 76,822. The county seat is Searcy. White County is Arkansas's 31st county, formed on October 23, 1835, from portions of Independence, Jackson, and Pulaski counties and named for Hugh Lawson White, a Whig candidate for President of the United States. It is an alcohol prohibition or dry county, though a few private establishments (such as the Searcy Country Club, and Veterans of Foreign Wars posts in Searcy and Beebe) can serve alcohol. White County comprises the Searcy, AR Micropolitan Statistical Area, which is also included in the Little Rock-North Little Rock, AR Combined Statistical Area.

== History ==
The first Americans that are believed to have settled in White County were John and Nancy Magness. They started in Tennessee and came to White County around 1815 and set up a farm in what is now Letona. White County was established by act of the Arkansas territorial legislature on October 23, 1835, by combining parts of Independence, Jackson, and Pulaski counties.

On May 17, 1862, White County was the site of the Little Red Skirmish between Union Major General Samuel J Curtis and a force of about 100 loosely-organized Confederates, followed by the battle at Whitney Lane in June, also known as The Skirmish at Searcy Landing.

In 1876, a religious cult called the Cobbites existed for a short period south of Searcy. Named after the group's leader, Reverend Cobb, bizarre behavior by members of the cult led to attention from local citizens, but after the murder of a man from Searcy, a mob attacked the group. Several Cobbites were killed and others arrested. Little is known about Reverend Cobb, not even his full name, other than that he came from Tennessee to White County in 1876. To his followers, he claimed to be God or Jesus Christ. He apparently believed he could perform the works of God, and he used a sycamore pole to command the sun to rise each morning and did the same each evening to command it to set.

During the 1960s, the U.S. Department of Defense constructed several Titan II missile silos in the county in the early 1960s. An accident at one site in 1965 killed fifty-three workers when a welder hit a hydraulic line with their welding rod, causing a fire that removed the oxygen and suffocated most of the workers in the facility.

== Geography ==
According to the U.S. Census Bureau, the county has a total area of 1,042 square miles (2,700 km^{2}), of which 1,035 square miles (2,680 km^{2}) is land and 7.1 square miles (18 km^{2}) (0.7%) is water. It is the second-largest county by area in Arkansas.

=== Major highways ===
- Interstate 57 / U.S. Highway 67
- U.S. Highway 64
- U.S. Highway 167
- Highway 5
- Highway 11
- Highway 13
- Highway 16
- Highway 31
- Highway 36
- Highway 87
- Highway 110
- Highway 124
- Highway 157
- Highway 258
- Highway 267
- Highway 305
- Highway 310
- Highway 320
- Highway 321
- Highway 323
- Highway 367
- Highway 385

=== Adjacent counties ===
- Independence County (north)
- Jackson County (northeast)
- Woodruff County (east)
- Prairie County (southeast)
- Lonoke County (southwest)
- Faulkner County (west)
- Cleburne County (northwest)

=== National and state protected areas ===
- Bald Knob National Wildlife Refuge
- Henry Gray / Hurricane Lake Wildlife Management Area

== Demographics ==
Historical population
Census	Pop.	Note	%±
1840	929		—
1850	2,619		181.9%
1860	8,316		217.5%
1870	10,347		24.4%
1880	17,794		72.0%
1890	22,946		29.0%
1900	24,864		8.4%
1910	28,574		14.9%
1920	34,603		21.1%
1930	38,269		10.6%
1940	37,176		−2.9%
1950	38,040		2.3%
1960	32,745		−13.9%
1970	39,253		19.9%
1980	50,835		29.5%
1990	54,676		7.6%
2000	67,165		22.8%
2010	77,076		14.8%
2020	76,822		−0.3%
2025 (est.)	80,085	▲	4.2%
U.S. Decennial Census; 1790–1960 1900–1990; 1990–2000 2010

=== 2020 census ===
As of the 2020 census, the county had a population of 76,822. The median age was 38.4 years. 23.3% of residents were under the age of 18 and 17.5% of residents were 65 years of age or older. For every 100 females there were 94.6 males, and for every 100 females age 18 and over there were 91.1 males age 18 and over.

The racial makeup of the county was 84.9% White, 4.9% Black or African American, 0.5% American Indian and Alaska Native, 0.8% Asian, <0.1% Native Hawaiian and Pacific Islander, 2.3% from some other race, and 6.6% from two or more races. Hispanic or Latino residents of any race comprised 4.6% of the population.

44.1% of residents lived in urban areas, while 55.9% lived in rural areas.

There were 29,705 households in the county, of which 31.1% had children under the age of 18 living in them. Of all households, 50.8% were married-couple households, 17.2% were households with a male householder and no spouse or partner present, and 26.6% were households with a female householder and no spouse or partner present. About 26.7% of all households were made up of individuals and 12.1% had someone living alone who was 65 years of age or older.

There were 33,270 housing units, of which 10.7% were vacant. Among occupied housing units, 67.5% were owner-occupied and 32.5% were renter-occupied. The homeowner vacancy rate was 1.8% and the rental vacancy rate was 9.4%.

=== 2000 census ===
As of the 2000 United States census, there were 67,165 people, 25,148 households, and 18,408 families residing in the county. The population density was 65 inhabitants per square mile (25/km^{2}). There were 27,613 housing units at an average density of 27 per square mile (10/km^{2}). The racial makeup of the county was 93.52% White, 3.56% Black or African American, 0.43% Native American, 0.32% Asian, 0.03% Pacific Islander, 0.82% from other races, and 1.31% from two or more races. 1.88% of the population were Hispanic or Latino of any race.

There were 25,148 households, out of which 33.00% had children under the age of 18 living with them, 59.90% were married couples living together, 9.50% had a female householder with no husband present, and 26.80% were non-families. 23.40% of all households were made up of individuals, and 10.50% had someone living alone who was 65 years of age or older. The average household size was 2.53 and the average family size was 2.98.

In the county, the population was spread out, with 24.40% under the age of 18, 12.80% from 18 to 24, 27.20% from 25 to 44, 21.90% from 45 to 64, and 13.80% who were 65 years of age or older. The median age was 35 years. For every 100 females, there were 95.20 males. For every 100 females age 18 and over, there were 92.90 males.

The median income for a household in the county was $32,203, and the median income for a family was $38,782. Males had a median income of $29,884 versus $20,323 for females. The per capita income for the county was $15,890. About 10.40% of families and 14.00% of the population were below the poverty line, including 18.10% of those under age 18 and 14.30% of those age 65 or over.

== Government ==
The county government is a constitutional body granted specific powers by the Constitution of Arkansas and the Arkansas Code. The quorum court is the legislative branch of the county government and controls all spending and revenue collection. Representatives are called justices of the peace and are elected from county districts every even-numbered year. The number of districts in a county vary from nine to fifteen, and district boundaries are drawn by the county election commission. The White County Quorum Court has thirteen members. Presiding over quorum court meetings is the county judge, who serves as the chief executive officer of the county. The county judge is elected at-large and does not vote in quorum court business, although capable of vetoing quorum court decisions. The 45th White County Judge was Michael Lincoln of Searcy, who served from January 2007 until his retirement in 2025. The current Judge is Lisa Brown, who succeeded Lincoln in January 2025. In 1988, White County elected virtually an entire slate of Republicans to county offices. Though such Republican sweeps had frequently occurred in northern and northwestern Arkansas, White County was the first in the Little Rock area to turn to Republicans as the party steadily made inroads toward a two-party system.

At the state level, White County is represented in the Arkansas State Senate by Republican Jonathan Dismang, a public accountant and former state representative from Searcy, of the 18th District. In the Arkansas House of Representatives, White County is split between five districts: the 39th, 40th, 57th, 58th, and 59th. District 39 is represented by Republican Wayne Long of Bradford, District 40 by Republican Shad Pearce of Batesville in Independence County, District 57 by Republican Cameron Cooper of Romance, District 58 by Republican Les Eaves of Searcy, and District 59 by Republican Jim Wooten of Beebe. White County is also under the state's 17th Judicial District, along with Prairie County, and is served by Prosecuting Attorney Rebecca Reed McCoy.

At the Federal level, White County is represented in the U.S. Senate by Republicans John Boozman and Tom Cotton. In the U.S. House of Representatives, it is in Arkansas's 2nd Congressional District and represented by Republican French Hill of Little Rock. Over the past few election cycles White County has trended heavily towards the GOP. The last Democrat (as of 2024) to carry this county was Bill Clinton in 1996.

White County, Arkansas Elected countywide officials
Position	Officeholder	Party
County Judge	Lisa Brown	Republican
County Clerk	Carla Barnett	Republican
Circuit Clerk	Sara Brown Carlton	Republican
Sheriff	Phillip Miller	Republican
Treasurer	Janet Hibbetts	Republican
Tax Collector	Beth Dorton	Republican
Tax Assessor	Gail Snyder	Republican
Coroner	Matt Smith	Republican

The composition of the Quorum Court following the 2024 elections is 13 Republicans. Justices of the Peace (members) of the Quorum Court following the elections are:

White County Quorum Court
District	Justice of the Peace	Party	Residence	District description
1	Doug Kennedy	Republican	Beebe	Southwest White County, including downtown and western Beebe; district includes Arkansas State University-Beebe.
2	Bobby Burns	Republican	Beebe	Southwest White County, including parts of Beebe, along with the communities of Barrentine Corner, and Opal.
3	Chris Boaz	Republican	El Paso	Western White County, including Rose Bud, along with the communities of El Paso, Floyd, Joy, Romance, and Sidon.
4	Allen King	Republican	Pangburn	North-central and west-central White County, including Letona and Pangburn, along with the communities of Albion, Center Hill, Clay, Dewey, Harmony, Holly Springs, and Pickens.
5	Jimmy L. House	Republican	Judsonia	Northern and northeastern White county, including Bradford, along with the communities of Hickory Flat, Midway (near Pleasant Plains), Providence, Roosevelt, Steprock, Sunnydale, and Velvet Ridge.
6	Shane Sellers	Republican	Judsonia	Central and north-central White County, including Judsonia and Kensett, along with the community of Plainview.
7	David H. Freppon	Republican	Bald Knob	Eastern White County, including Bald Knob and Russel, along with the communities of Liberty Valley, Plainview, and Worden.
8	Charles "Chuck" Lang	Republican	Georgetown	Southern and southeastern White County, including Garner, Georgetown Griffithville, Higginson McRae, West Point, and southern portions of Searcy, along with the communities of Andrews, Gum Springs, Morning Sun, Vinity Corner, and Walker.
9	Mike Cleveland	Republican	Searcy	Central, south-central, and west-central White County, including southwestern portions of Searcy, along with the community of Gum Springs.
10	Keith Carlisle	Republican	Searcy	Central White County, including western portions of Searcy, along with the communities of Fourmile Hill and Smyrna.
11	Nathan Lincoln	Republican	Searcy	Central White County, including portions of downtown and northern Searcy, along with the communities of Bee Rock and Fourmile Hill.
12	Joel "JP" Pritchett	Republican	Searcy	Central White County, including portions of downtown, northern, and western Searcy.
13	Kenneth Liles	Republican	Searcy	Central White County, including portions of southern and eastern Searcy; district includes most of Harding University.

Additionally, the townships of White County are entitled to elect their own respective constables, as set forth by the Constitution of Arkansas. Constables are largely of historical significance as they were used to keep the peace in rural areas when travel was more difficult.

The township constables as of the 2024 elections are:

- Big Creek: Jesse Pate (R)
- Cadron: Dusty Betts (R)
- Cypert: Brent Davis (R)
- Dogwood: Paul Barnett (R)
- Gray: Kim Pearson (R)
- Gum Springs: Kevin McCoy (R)
- Harrison: Greg Meharg (R)
- Liberty: Phillip Simpson (R)
- Union: Chris Ward (R)

United States presidential election results for White County, Arkansas
Year	Republican		Democratic		Third party(ies)	
Year	No.	%	No.	%	No.	%
1896	559	16.16%	2,876	83.12%	25	0.72%
1900	811	30.26%	1,694	63.21%	175	6.53%
1904	676	31.40%	1,238	57.50%	239	11.10%
1908	887	29.20%	1,788	58.85%	363	11.95%
1912	380	15.10%	1,448	57.53%	689	27.37%
1916	673	19.25%	2,823	80.75%	0	0.00%
1920	1,359	37.82%	2,086	58.06%	148	4.12%
1924	679	27.69%	1,488	60.69%	285	11.62%
1928	1,957	45.73%	2,299	53.73%	23	0.54%
1932	430	11.61%	3,251	87.75%	24	0.65%
1936	535	17.57%	2,503	82.20%	7	0.23%
1940	876	20.64%	3,345	78.80%	24	0.57%
1944	1,346	34.71%	2,532	65.29%	0	0.00%
1948	833	18.01%	3,193	69.04%	599	12.95%
1952	2,884	40.79%	4,179	59.11%	7	0.10%
1956	3,813	43.58%	4,895	55.94%	42	0.48%
1960	3,985	40.52%	5,244	53.33%	605	6.15%
1964	5,023	42.99%	6,566	56.20%	95	0.81%
1968	3,887	32.02%	3,198	26.34%	5,054	41.63%
1972	8,701	67.24%	4,161	32.15%	79	0.61%
1976	4,756	29.42%	11,412	70.58%	0	0.00%
1980	8,079	46.66%	8,750	50.54%	484	2.80%
1984	12,566	64.66%	6,603	33.97%	266	1.37%
1988	11,094	60.84%	6,957	38.15%	183	1.00%
1992	8,538	39.60%	10,494	48.67%	2,531	11.74%
1996	8,659	41.25%	10,204	48.61%	2,128	10.14%
2000	13,170	59.46%	8,342	37.66%	638	2.88%
2004	17,001	64.34%	9,129	34.55%	295	1.12%
2008	19,467	72.22%	6,732	24.97%	756	2.80%
2012	20,011	75.47%	5,765	21.74%	738	2.78%
2016	21,077	75.28%	5,170	18.46%	1,752	6.26%
2020	24,182	78.30%	5,978	19.36%	725	2.35%
2024	24,514	79.50%	5,641	18.29%	682	2.21%

== Economy ==
One of the state's largest banks, First Security Bank, was established in Searcy in 1932 as Security Bank. First Security now has over $8 billion in assets and 78 locations in Arkansas.

The first Wal-Mart distribution center away from the corporate headquarters in Bentonville was established in Searcy.

== Education ==
=== Public education ===
Public education is provided by several public school districts including:

- Searcy School District, with six schools serving more than 3,800 students; includes Searcy High School, Searcy
- Beebe School District, with seven schools serving more than 3,200 students; includes Beebe High School, Beebe, and Beebe Middle School, McRae
- Riverview School District, with four schools serving more than 1,000 students; includes Riverview High School, Searcy, with elementary campuses in Judsonia and Kensett
- Bald Knob School District, with three schools serving more than 1,000 students; includes Bald Knob High School, Bald Knob
- White County Central School District, with three schools serving more than 800 students; includes White County Central High School, Judsonia
- Pangburn School District, with two schools serving more than 700 students; includes Pangburn High School, Pangburn
- Rose Bud School District, with two schools serving more than 600 students; including Rose Bud High School, Rose Bud
- Bradford School District, with two schools serving nearly 400 students; includes Bradford High School, Bradford

A small portion of northern White County, including the community of Roosevelt, is in the Midland School District, located in neighboring Independence County. A small portion of western White County, including Hammondsville, is in the Mount Vernon-Enola School District, located in neighboring Faulkner County.

=== Private education ===
- CrossPointe Preparatory, Searcy, Independent Christian School
- Harding Academy, Searcy, Churches of Christ. More than 500 students are enrolled PK-12.
- Searcy Christian Academy, Searcy, Christian
- Lighthouse Christian Academy, Beebe, Pentecostal
- Sunshine School, Searcy
- Trinity Christian School, Bradford, Baptist

=== Colleges and universities ===
- Arkansas State University-Beebe Public, established in 1927 as The Junior Agricultural School of Central Arkansas.
- Arkansas State University-Searcy A technical branch of Arkansas State University
- Harding University Private, Churches of Christ enrollment over 6000.

== Communities ==
=== Cities ===
- Bald Knob
- Beebe
- Bradford
- Judsonia
- Kensett
- McRae
- Pangburn
- Searcy (county seat)

=== Towns ===
- Garner
- Georgetown
- Griffithville
- Higginson
- Letona
- Rose Bud
- Russell
- West Point

=== Census-designated places ===
- El Paso
- Floyd

=== Unincorporated communities ===
- Albion — north-central White County, between Four Mile Hill or "Boothill" and Pangburn, and north of Letona, along Arkansas Highway 16 and surrounding county roads
- Antioch — western White County, north of Beebe, along Arkansas Highways 31 and 267 and surrounding county roads
- Andrews
- Bare Stone
- Barrentine Corner
- Bee Rock
- Belcher
- Center Hill — central White County, approximately 8 miles west of Searcy, situated along Arkansas Highway 36 and 305 and surrounding county roads
- Clay
- Conant
- Crosby
- Dewey
- Dogwood
- Doniphan
- Enright
- Essex
- Four Mile Hill or "Boot Hill" — central White County, northwest of Searcy and southeast of Albion, along Arkansas Highway 16 and surrounding county roads
- Georgia Ridge
- Gravel Hill — western White County, northwest of Floyd and south of Joy, situated between Arkansas Highways 31 and 36 along Gravel Hill Road and surrounding county roads
- Hammondsville – western White County, between Romance and El Paso, primarily situated along Hammons Chapel Road (connecting Highway 5 and El Paso Road)
- Happy — 2.9 miles (4.7 km) north of Griffithville and 7.5 miles (12.1 km) southeast of Searcy along Arkansas Highway 385
- Harmony — central White County, southwest of Center Hill, situated along Arkansas Highway 305 and surrounding county roads
- Hart
- Hickory Flat
- Holly Springs
- Joy — central White County, between Rose Bud and Center Hill, situated along Arkansas Highway 36 and surrounding county roads
- Keeler Corner
- Liberty Valley — eastern White County, between Bald Knob and the White River, along U.S. Highway 64 East and surrounding county roads
- Little Red
- Midway (near Bald Knob) — 2.5 miles (4.0 km) southwest of Bald Knob on Arkansas Highway 367
- Midway (near Pleasant Plains) — 3 miles (4.8 km) southeast of Pleasant Plains on U.S. Route 167
- Mitchell Corner
- Morning Sun — annexed to Higginson in 2008
- Nimmo
- Opal — southwestern White County, between El Paso and Beebe, along U.S. Highway 64 West and Opal Road and surrounding county roads
- Pickens — north-central White County, between Sidon and Letona, along Arkansas Highway 310 (Pickens Chapel Road) and Pickens Road and surrounding county roads
- Plainview — northeastern White County, north of Judsonia, along Arkansas Highways 157 and 385 and surrounding county roads
- Pryor
- Providence — northeastern White County, north of Judsonia and northwest of Bald Knob, along Arkansas Highways 157 and 258 and surrounding county roads; site of White County Central Schools
- Rio Vista
- Romance — western White County, between Rose Bud and El Paso, along Arkansas Highways 5 and 31 and surrounding county roads
- Showalter's Corner
- Sidon — north-central White County, west of Pickens and north of Joy, along Arkansas Highway 310 and surrounding county roads
- Smyrna
- Steprock
- Sunnydale
- Twentythree — northeastern White County, 5 mile north of Bald Knob, along U.S. Highway 167 and surrounding county roads
- Velvet Ridge — northeastern White County, 8 mile north of Bald Knob, along U.S. Highway 167 and surrounding county roads
- Vinity Corner — south-central White County, south of Garner and southeast of McRae, along West Vinity Road, North Vinity Road, and other county roads southeast of Arkansas Highway 367
- Walker — southeastern White County, south of Higginson and west of Griffithville, along Arkansas Highway 11 (Walker Road) and surrounding county roads
- Worden
- Wright's Corner

=== Historic towns ===
- Beeler Ferry
- Bethel Grove
- Denmark
- Jasmine
- Mount Pisgah
- Old Stoney Point
- Roosevelt
- Russell
- Union Hill

=== Townships ===
Townships in Arkansas are the divisions of a county. Each township includes unincorporated areas; some may have incorporated cities or towns within part of their boundaries. Arkansas townships have limited purposes in modern times. However, the United States census does list Arkansas population based on townships (sometimes referred to as "county subdivisions" or "minor civil divisions"). Townships are also of value for historical purposes in terms of genealogical research. Each town or city is within one or more townships in an Arkansas county based on census maps and publications. The townships of White County are listed below; listed in parentheses are the cities, towns, and/or census-designated places that are fully or partially inside the township.

- Albion
- Antioch
- Bald Knob (Bald Knob)
- Big Creek (Pangburn)
- Cadron
- Cane
- Chrisp
- Clay
- Cleveland
- Coffey
- Coldwell
- Crosby
- Cypert
- Denmark
- Des Arc
- Dogwood (Griffithville)
- El Paso
- Francure (Georgetown)
- Garner (Garner)
- Gravel Hill
- Gray (most of Searcy, part of Kensett)
- Gum Springs (part of Searcy)
- Guthrie
- Harrison (most of Judsonia, part of Searcy)
- Hartsell Township
- Higginson Township (Higginson, part of Searcy)
- Jackson
- Jefferson
- Joy
- Kensett (most of Kensett, small part of Searcy)
- Kentucky (Rose Bud)
- Liberty (Bradford)
- McRae (McRae)
- Marion (Letona)
- Marshall
- Mount Pisgah
- Red River (West Point, part of Judsonia)
- Royal
- Russell (Russell)
- Union (Beebe)
- Velvet Ridge
- Walker

== See also ==
- Crow Lake (Arkansas)
- List of lakes in White County, Arkansas
- National Register of Historic Places listings in White County, Arkansas
