= Area code 501 =

Area code for central Arkansas

Coordinates: 34°48′N 92°18′W

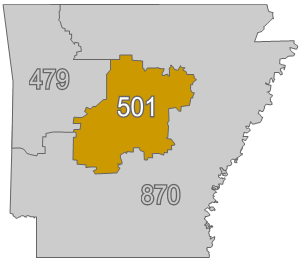
Area code 501 as of post 2002.

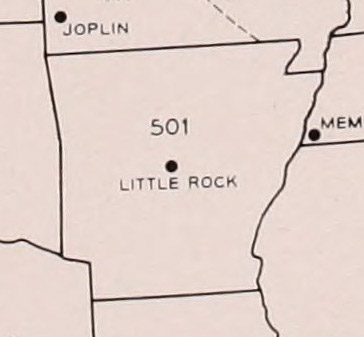
Area code 501 as of 1947–1995.

Area code 501 is a telephone area code in the North American Numbering Plan (NANP) for central Arkansas, including Little Rock and most of its suburbs. The numbering plan area (NPA) comprises most communities in Cleburne, Conway, Faulkner, Garland, Hot Spring, Lonoke, Perry, Pulaski, Saline, White and Van Buren counties.

== History ==
Area code 501 is one of the original North American area codes assigned in 1947 when the American Telephone and Telegraph Company (AT&T) created a nationwide telephone numbering plan. Originally it served all of Arkansas. Due to Arkansas' relatively low population density, 501 remained the sole area code for the state until 1995, when area code 870 was created to serve north-central, northeast, eastern and southern Arkansas. In 2002, the northwestern part of the state, including Fort Smith and Fayetteville, was split off with area code 479.

Prior to October 2021, area code 501 had telephone numbers assigned for the central office code 988. In 2020, 988 was designated nationwide as a dialing code for the National Suicide Prevention Lifeline, which created a conflict for exchanges that permit seven-digit dialing. This area code was transitioned to ten-digit dialing on October 24, 2021.

== Service area ==
Major cities in the numbering plan area include:

- Benton
- Bryant
- Cabot
- Conway
- Hot Springs
- Jacksonville
- Little Rock
- Malvern
- Morrilton
- North Little Rock
- Searcy
- Sherwood

Arkansas area codes: 479, 501, 870/327
	North: 870/327	
West: 479	area code 501	East: 870/327
	South: 870/327	
