= Murder of Kacie Woody =

2002 murder of a thirteen year old girl from Arkansas

Kacie Woody
- Undated school portrait of Kacie
- Born: October 17, 1989; Little Rock, Arkansas, United States
- Died: December 4, 2002 (aged 13); Conway, Arkansas, United States 35.09170°N 92.49226°W
- Cause of death: Homicide by gunshot
- Resting place: South Crossroads Church Cemetery, Rose Bud, Arkansas; 35.40426°N 92.04757°W (approximate)
- Education: Greenbrier Middle School
- Occupation: Student
- Known for: Victim of catfishing and murder by an online predator
- Website: Memorial website at the Wayback Machine (archived June 16, 2024)

Kacie Rene Woody (October 17, 1989 – December 4, 2002) was an American teenager from Holland, Arkansas, who was lured, abducted, raped and murdered by 47-year-old David Leslie Fuller from La Mesa, California. She had met Fuller, who claimed to be a 17-year-old named Dave Fagen living in San Diego, in a Yahoo! Messenger Christian chat room for teens. Fuller traveled to Arkansas and abducted Woody from her home on the night of December 3, 2002. The next day, the bodies of both Woody and Fuller were found in the rear of a minivan inside a storage unit in Conway; Fuller had shot himself as law enforcement closed in on the unit.

Woody's case is possibly the first well-documented case of a pedophile using the Internet to groom, abduct, and murder a victim, being featured on the Investigation Discovery documentary shows Web of Lies Man with a Van, and most recently in 2026, Fatal First Date. After Kacie's murder, her friends and family founded the Kacie Woody Foundation to educate parents and children about the dangers associated with the Internet.

== Background ==
Kacie Woody was born on October 17, 1989, at Baptist Medical Center in Little Rock, Arkansas, to Rick and Kristie Woody. She had two brothers, Austin and Tim. On June 19, 1997, when Woody was 7 years old, her mother died in a car accident, while the family was on their way home from Tim's baseball game. The car collided with a horse that had run into the road; the animal shattered the windshield and hit Kristie, who was sitting in the passenger seat. Everyone else in the vehicle survived, although Rick, who was driving, suffered broken ribs.

In 2002, Woody lived in Holland, Arkansas, with her father, Rick, her brother Tim, and Tim's friend, Eric Betts. Her maternal aunt, Teresa Paul, lived in the house next door. Woody was enrolled at Greenbrier Middle School, being a member of the band, choir, and talented and gifted programs. Kacie was described as a very friendly and caring girl who was very close to her family and friends, and whose hobbies included poetry, singing, dancing, and playing the saxophone.

Location of Holland in Faulkner County, Arkansas

The Woody home was in a heavily wooded rural area, and due to many outgoing landline calls being billed as long distance, Rick allowed Woody to use instant messaging on the family's computer to keep in touch with her friends. She registered on Yahoo! Messenger with either the username "modelbehavior63" or "modelbehavior36" (accounts vary). Kacie eventually started using chat rooms to meet new friends, and on either New Year's Eve 2001 (according to Web of Lies), or in the summer of 2002 (according to the written account, Caught in the Web), she befriended Fuller, who went by the username "jazzman_df" and gave his name as Dave Fagen. The photo on jazzman_df's profile was of a "surfer dude"-type attractive young man; he claimed to love surfing and the beach, and the two bonded quickly and began to chat often. Kacie eventually told Dave about the loss of her mother, and he told her that his "aunt", who also happened to live in Arkansas, was recently in a car accident and was now comatose, and that she was not expected to live much longer.

Woody felt sad about Dave's aunt and told her family and friends about him and the situation. Her close friends Sam and Jessica also befriended Dave and added him to their Yahoo "buddy" lists. At the same time, Sam was fearful over Woody's naïvety and warned her about becoming close to and falling in love with people that she hadn't met in person. Since Kacie's father worked long swing shifts as a police officer with the Greenbrier police department, he stated during his Web of Lies interview that he often wasn't home to monitor her Internet activity, although he was, at the time, aware that she was talking to boys online. He wasn't particularly worried, as long as he knew that she was at home and the boys were elsewhere. Around the summer of 2002, when Woody told her father Rick that Dave was turning 18, he told her to stop talking to him online, stating that Dave was too old for her; Kacie disobeyed her father and started talking with Dave over the phone, despite the long-distance charges.

One night, likely in the autumn of 2002, Dave called Woody while her friend Jessica was spending the night at Woody's house. During this time, the girls heard strange sounds around the outside of the house, and a floorboard squeaked in the kitchen, as if an intruder was on the property. The girls rushed into Woody's bedroom and blocked the door with a dresser. Woody told Dave that she was afraid someone was in the house; he told her that nobody was in the house and not to worry; the noises then stopped.

Woody's friend Sam was doubtful as to Dave's stated age, based on his use of outdated slang, including such terms as "groovy" and "far out". Woody had assumed this was due to him being from California, and that people there talked differently than in Arkansas.

At some point, Woody met an actual boy in a chat room, Tazz2999. He claimed to be a 14-year-old named Scott from Alpharetta, Georgia, who loved football and wrestling. The photo on his profile was of a young teen boy in a football uniform. Woody and Scott began "dating" on October 3, 2002. When Dave learned about the relationship, he stated that he wished to "remain friends" with Kacie; he also increased his talk about his aunt and her "worsening condition".

On the morning of Tuesday, December 3, 2002, Sam noticed that Kacie had the photo from Scott's online profile hanging in her locker and remarked that he was "hot"; Woody misheard the word as "fat" and became angry, resulting in an argument between the two. When Sam asked Woody how she got the photo, she told her that Scott had mailed it to her. Alarmed to hear that the photo of Scott had been mailed to Woody, Sam warned her again about giving her address to people whom she had never met in person, telling her that Scott "could be an 80-year-old rapist and that the photo could be of his grandson". Woody did not take this warning seriously. Without her knowledge, Sam told the school counselor that Kacie had been giving out her phone number to strangers online; the counselor called Woody into her office, warned her about the dangers of the Internet, and told her not to meet any online friends in person without a parent present. Woody responded that she only gave her phone number to people her father approved, a statement which Sam did not believe. The counselor then called Sam to the office, leaving her and Kacie alone to talk; they reconciled. When school ended, Woody asked Sam if she could spend the night at her house. The latter declined, because her mother likely wouldn't have allowed a sleepover on a school night, and Kacie would have needed a written note from her father in order to be allowed to be dropped off at Sam's house. Woody then asked Jessica, and then another friend. Both of them turned it down as well. She appeared not to be upset about the refusals and said goodbye to her friends before boarding the school bus. Sam and Jessica found it unusual that Kacie had asked about a sleepover on a school night.

== Disappearance and investigation ==
On the evening of December 3, Woody was home alone; her brother Tim was doing research at his college's library, Eric Betts was at his electrician's class, and Rick was on duty in Greenbrier. In addition, Paul, her aunt, was at her daughter's basketball game in Conway. Woody was instant messaging (IM) with her online boyfriend Scott on the computer, while talking to Dave over the phone. Dave told Kacie that his "aunt's" condition continued to worsen, and that he was driving to Arkansas to be by her side until she died. At 9:41 p.m. (unknown if CST or EST), Kacie's messages with Scott suddenly stopped. Scott, alarmed, continued to message Kacie as a means of alerting her household that she was missing. He emailed Jessica and attempted to phone the Woody house without success.

When Betts returned home from his class at about 10:15 p.m. CST and noticed that Woody wasn't there, he assumed she was in bed, or out with family or friends, and continued his normal routine. When Tim returned home at around 11:40 p.m. and noticed that Woody wasn't in bed, he notified Rick, who rapidly returned home in his squad car. Rick noticed that the house showed signs of sudden disturbance: Kacie's reading glasses, which she used while on the computer, were on his recliner and missing a lens, her pet Yorkshire Terrier was limping, and the computer was still running with the chat window between her and Scott open. Rick called Kacie's friends, who hadn't recently heard from or seen her, and eventually called for police backup. Either Tim or Betts messaged Scott, learning of Kacie's conversation with Dave and how she had suddenly stopped responding to Scott's IMs.

Police investigators initially considered the possibility that Woody had run away, which Rick denied, stating that she was happy with her life and would not leave the house without telling him. He had last spoken to her around 7 p.m. that evening; when he had called to check in on her, she had been practicing her saxophone, and nothing had seemed unusual. It was noticed that all of Woody's coats and shoes were left behind, while temperatures that night were close to 30°F with rain, leading authorities to suspect an abduction. A massive investigation, involving the Federal Bureau of Investigation, the Arkansas State Police, every law enforcement agency in Faulkner County, police dogs, and dozens of volunteers was launched. A Level II Morgan Nick alert was issued at 5:14 a.m. Investigators seized the Woody computer and questioned students and staff at Greenbrier Middle School; they were told about Scott and Dave by Woody's friends. An FBI agent also discovered discarded notes containing the two males' names in Woody's trash container. Scott's computer was traced to his home in Alpharetta. FBI agents visited the property, where his mother answered the door. Scott’s parents were unaware of who Kacie was, or even that their son had a girlfriend. Once the FBI had determined that Scott had given his true identity online, and was at home when Kacie disappeared, he was cleared of suspicion.

Investigators learned from Woody's friends that Dave had told her he was on his way to Arkansas from California at the time she disappeared. They launched a search around the local area for clues to his location; at Conway Motel 6, they discovered a 1993 Buick Regal with a California license plate. Detectives learned that it belonged to a man named David Fuller, who had checked in on December 2 and booked his stay for a week, requested no maid service, and had angrily complained to the staff about not being able to connect to the Internet from his room. When detectives searched his room, they found Fuller's packed suitcase, laptop, camouflage clothing and rubber gloves; they noticed that the bed had not been slept in.

After checking with the Conway Enterprise Rent-A-Car, where an employee stated that Fuller had behaved strangely, repeatedly stepping outside to smoke while filling out his paperwork, detectives subpoenaed the paperwork. They learned that his phone number matched one repeatedly dialed from the Woody home, that he'd rented a silver Dodge Caravan minivan, and that his credit card had very recently been charged by a self-storage facility in Conway. Fuller was confirmed to be "Dave" and was upgraded from a person of interest to a suspect in Kacie's disappearance.

Units at Guardsmart Storage (now Midgard Self Storage), the location of Kacie's murder, photographed sometime after

Conway Police Sgt. Jim Barrett and two FBI agents arrived at Fuller's storage unit at around 6:00 p.m. on December 4. The door was pulled down and had no lock; when it was lifted, they noticed the silver Dodge Caravan inside, forward-facing with its engine running. When Barrett began to enter the unit, a single gunshot was fired. Law enforcement ran for cover and called for backup, while shouting commands for anyone inside to surrender, with no result. When a SWAT team arrived around 8:30 p.m., they stormed the unit.

The single gunshot that had occurred after police lifted the storage unit's door turned out to be David Fuller shooting himself in the head; his body was found lying on the floor behind the minivan, still holding a 9mm Luger near the van's back seats, which had been removed. Barrett found Woody's body lying supine in the back of the minivan, with her wrists and ankles chained to the four corners of the van's floor. Fuller had raped her before shooting her in the head. Also found were a half-empty bottle of chloroform and a rag next to Woody's head. (Note: The Man With a Van episode states that the bottle of chloroform was found in the Woody home at the beginning of the investigation.) Although Kacie's time of death could not be agreed upon, it was determined that she had been dead for hours, and a medical examiner concluded that she had likely been rendered unconscious by the chloroform from her abduction to the time she was murdered.

== Perpetrator ==
David Fuller

David Leslie Fuller (January 18, 1955 – December 4, 2002) was born in Salt Lake City, Utah, the fourth and youngest child of Edward "Ned" and June Fuller. His parents were devout Mormons.

At age 19, he married an unidentified woman and moved with her to Moab, Utah, although they ended their marriage shortly after. He met his future wife Sally Krens in the early 1980s, while he played bass guitar at a local bar. They married on May 21, 1983, and moved to Salt Lake City. Fuller would remain married to Krens until the time of his death.

Fuller became a Navy Seabee in 1989, before the couple moved to Gulfport, Mississippi, in which state they had a son. They later moved to Maryland, where they had a daughter, and then to San Diego. The children were 11 and 7 years old at the time of Fuller's death.

The family moved to La Mesa around 1997, and Fuller left the Navy two years later. As the marriage went on, Fuller developed anger problems and mood swings. He also eventually began spending long hours online and taking nighttime walks around the neighborhood while talking on his phone. In June 2002, Krens obtained paperwork from a divorce workshop while Fuller took the children to visit his parents. When he returned, he was very angry to learn this.

In August of that year, Child Protective Services of California investigated a report that Fuller had been showering with his daughter; it was eventually concluded that this was untrue. Sometime after Fuller moved into his own apartment, still in La Mesa, he was arrested and charged with spousal abuse after he had returned to Krens’ home one night, shoved and screamed at her, and then unlocked a bedroom door with a screwdriver after she had locked herself and the children inside. Fuller had also once been arrested and fined for indecent exposure after exposing himself to two young girls, and had been fired from his job as a used car salesman after being caught watching pornography on the work computer.

After Fuller's death, the FBI got a warrant to search his apartment, and discovered a framed collage of photos of Woody near his computer, and papers with her and her friends' names, phone numbers, and addresses written down. Stored on the computer was a poem Kacie had written about her mother's death, and photos of Woody and her friends. The FBI also learned that under Fuller's Dave Fagen persona, he had attempted to groom at least three other girls around Kacie's age, beginning in the winter of 2000, although none of these attempts led to offline encounters. He had offered to buy a Michigan girl a plane ticket to California, which she refused, and in March 2002, mailed a Dallas girl flowers, although she told detectives that she'd never given him her address.

Police also discovered that Fuller had already visited Arkansas twice before, both times in the fall of 2002. The first time, he'd flown into Clinton National Airport on October 11, rented a car, and checked into a Motel 6 in Conway. It is believed that he spied on Kacie and her home during this trip, although it is not certain.

Fuller bought a gun on November 2, telling his children that he needed it for target practice. Two days later, he again flew to Little Rock, rented a car, and checked in at the Motel 6. On November 6, he visited Guardsmart, looking for the largest unit available and telling an on-site manager that he bought vehicles and needed a place to temporarily store them. He extended his stay on November 8. Authorities speculated that he'd planned to abduct Kacie at this time, but was unable to.

After returning home, Fuller bought duct tape, chain, and zip ties from his local Home Depot, and obtained the bottle of chloroform from a chemical supply company. He then packed the supplies in his Buick Regal before driving to Arkansas and abducting Kacie.

Investigators later ran Fuller's DNA through a national database in order to learn if he had committed similar crimes prior to Woody's abduction and murder; no matches were found.

Fuller's remains were cremated. Krens kept his ashes in her closet, intending to, at some point, take the children to Mount Olympus to scatter them. Fuller was finally interred at Wasatch Lawn Memorial Park in Millcreek, Utah, over the remains of his parents, both of whom died after Fuller.

== Reactions ==
Conway Police Sgt. Jim Barrett stated in his Web of Lies interview that Woody's death had such an effect on him that, when he returned home from his shift early the next morning, he disconnected his computer from the Internet and canceled his subscription.

At first, Fuller's parents did not believe reporters who told them about their son's crime and death, but police were later able to convince them. Fuller's father, Ned, wanted to call Rick Woody to express his condolences but was discouraged by the officers.

Woody's funeral was held on December 9; she is buried in South Crossroads Church Cemetery in Rose Bud, Arkansas, next to her mother.

Woody's friends and family founded the Kacie Woody Foundation, a nonprofit organization designed to teach parents and children about Internet safety; Rick stated that he founded the organization in her honor because Woody liked to help people, as well as to help prevent other children from suffering her fate. The Kacie Woody Foundation website was disabled in 2024.

In spring 2003, Rick granted federal and state authorities' permission to share Woody's story in an Internet safety and law enforcement training program by the FBI called "Innocent Images". That June, the FBI released patches depicting a teddy bear sitting next to a computer, with its screen reading "KACIE WOODY 1989-2002" for the program's task force to wear.

During her Man With a Van interview, Jessica recalled that she and Woody heard an intruder the night she was at the Woody home, and stated that in retrospect, it could have been Fuller looking to abduct Woody and possibly her as well.

On December 3, 2012, 10 years from the day of Woody's abduction, her friends and family held a service for her at Greenbrier High School.

== Media appearances ==
- In December 2003, former Arkansas Democrat-Gazette journalist Cathy Frye wrote a four-part documentary about Kacie's life and murder titled Caught in the Web.
- On January 15, 2014, the Investigation Discovery documentary series Web of Lies aired an episode titled Age, Sex, Location about Kacie's case.
- On February 20, 2020, fellow Investigation Discovery documentary series Man With a Van aired an episode about the case titled Catfish Killer.
- On March 8, 2021, Kacie's brother Tim, now a police officer, was interviewed by KATV about losing his younger sister to an online predator.

== See also ==
- List of kidnappings
- Murder of Carly Ryan
- Alicia Kozakiewicz
