= 374th Strategic Missile Squadron =

Military unit of the United States Air Force

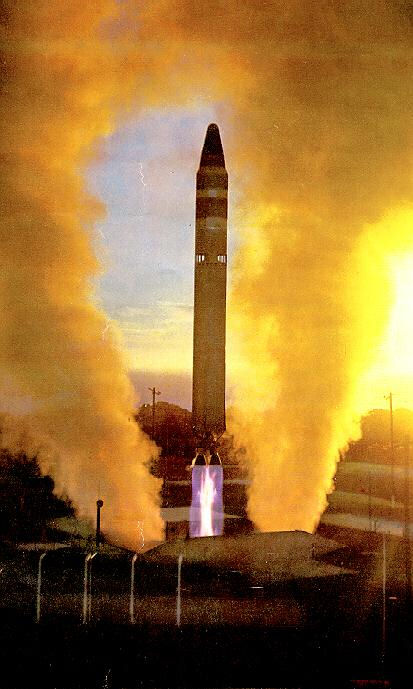
- LGM-25C Titan II Test Launch at Vandenberg AFB, California
- Active: 1942–1946; 1947–1951; 1951–1961; 1962–1986
- Country: United States
- Branch: United States Air Force
- Type: Squadron
- Role: Intercontinental ballistic missile
- Engagements: China Burma India Theater

- Decorations: Distinguished Unit Citation (3x) Air Force Outstanding Unit Award

Insignia
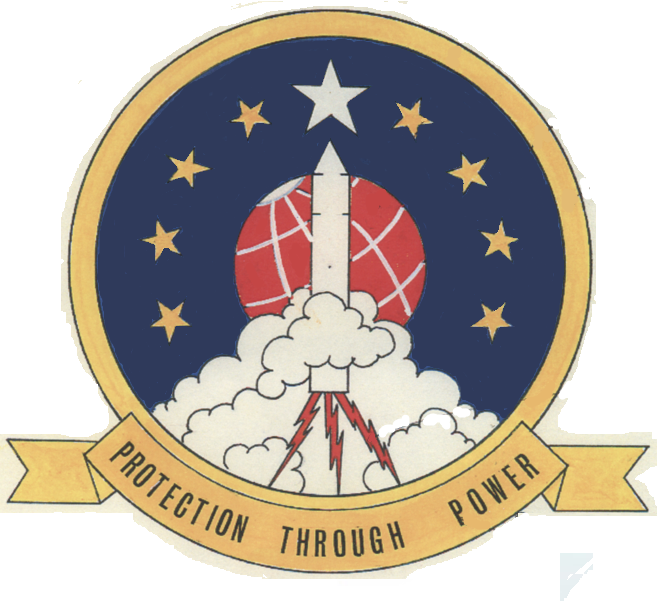
- 374th Strategic Missile Squadron emblem (Note: Approved 23 April 1963. Description:On an Air Force blue disc bordered Air Force golden yellow, a reddish-orange globe, axis bendwise, grid lines and polar area white below an arc of nine stars, a large white one in chief, four Air Force golden yellow ones on either side, issuing from base and surmounting the lower portion of the globe, a white cloud formation; piercing the cloud a white missile in upward flight palewise emitting three red lightning flashes radiant to base; outlines and details Air Force blue throughout. Below the disc on an Air Force golden yellow scroll, the motto edged and inscribed in Air Force blue. Significance: Against a background of ultramarine blue and golden yellow, a missile, clouds, the earth, and lightning bolts all indicate instantaneous, powerful reaction of global proportions. The nine stars represent the nine missile complexes originally assigned to the squadron upon activation. The large white star represents this unit's goal of achievement.)

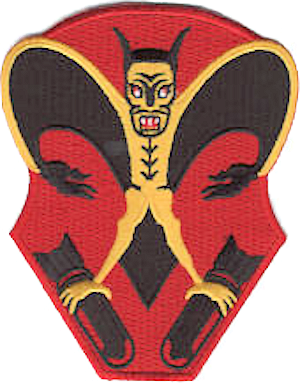
- Patch with 374th Bombardment Squadron emblem (Note: Approved 23 July 1952. Description: On an irregular diamond shield red a phantom "bat-man' head, body and legs yellow, wings hands, headgear black, grasping in each foot a bomb black. Although this emblem was not approved until 1952, it was used by the unit during World War II. ] Watkins, p. 84.)

The 374th Strategic Missile Squadron is an inactive United States Air Force unit, last assigned to the 308th Strategic Missile Wing at Little Rock Air Force Base, Arkansas. The squadron was equipped with the LGM-25C Titan II intercontinental ballistic missile, with a mission of nuclear deterrence. It was inactivated as part of the phaseout of the Titan II ICBM on 15 August 1986. The squadron was responsible for Launch Complex 374–7, site of the 1980 explosion of a Titan II ICBM in Damascus, Arkansas.

The squadron was first activated in April 1942 as the 374th Bombardment Squadron. After training in the United States, the squadron deployed to China in early 1943. It engaged in combat, primarily in China and Southeast Asia until June 1945, when it assumed a mainly transport role. It was awarded two Distinguished Unit Citations for its operations in China and its attacks on Japanese shipping. At the end of 1945 it returned to the United States for inactivation.

The squadron was redesignated the 374th Reconnaissance Squadron and activated in California in 1947. It was inactivated in 1949. It returned to its bombardment designation in 1951 and operated Boeing B-47 Stratojets for Strategic Air Command. In 1959 it transferred its aircraft to another unit as part of a test of a "super wing" concept, and was not operational until in inactivated in 1961.

== History ==
=== World War II ===
==== Initial organization and training ====
The squadron was activated at Gowen Field, Idaho on 15 April 1942 as the 374th Bombardment Squadron, one of the four original squadrons of the 308th Bombardment Group. As the squadron was forming and beginning its training in Consolidated B-24 Liberators, at Alamogordo Army Air Field, New Mexico in August 1942, almost all its personnel were transferred to the 330th Bombardment Group.

The following month, a fresh cadre taken from the 39th Bombardment Group joined the group. In addition to its own training activities, at the beginning of October, the unit was briefly designated as an Operational Training Unit The squadron began its movement to the China Burma India Theater in January 1943. The air echelon ferried its Liberators across the Atlantic and Africa, leaving from Morrison Field, while the ground echelon moved by ship across the Pacific.

==== Combat operations ====
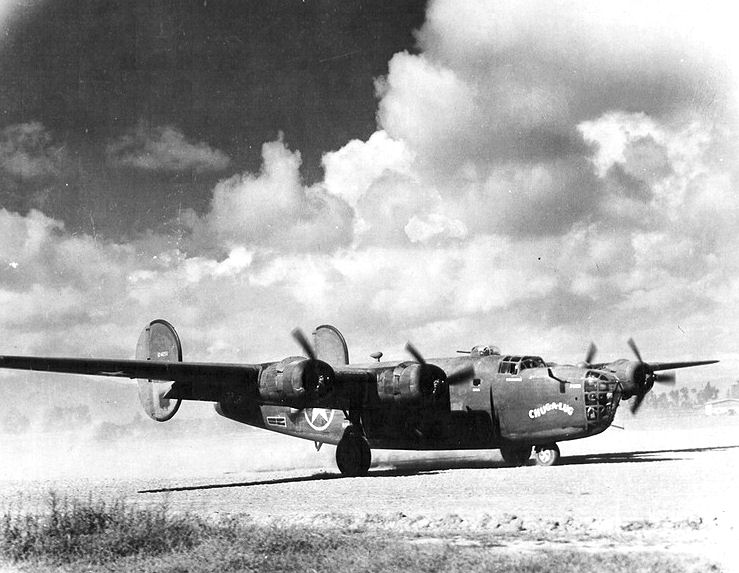
308th Bombardment Group B-24D Liberator at Kwanghan Airfield, China (Note: Aircraft is Consolidated B-24D-25-CO Liberator, serial 41-24251, Chug-A-Lug.)

In late March 1943, the squadron arrived at Chengkung Airfield, China. In order to prepare for and sustain combat operations in China, the squadron had to conduct numerous flights over the Hump transporting gasoline, lubricants, ordnance, spare parts and the other items it needed. The 374th supported Chinese ground forces and attacked airfields, coal yards, docks, oil refineries and fuel dumps in French Indochina. It attacked shipping, mined rivers and ports and bombed maintenance shops and docks at Rangoon, Burma and attacked Japanese shipping in the East China Sea, Formosa Straits, South China Sea and Gulf of Tonkin. On 21 August 1943, the squadron conducted an unescorted bombing attack on docks and warehouses at Hankow, China, pressing its attack despite heavy flak and fighter opposition. For this mission it was awarded a Distinguished Unit Citation (DUC). Its operations interdicting Japanese shipping in 1944 and 1945 earned it a second DUC.

On 26 October 1944, Major Horace S. Carswell, the squadron's operations officer, attacked a Japanese convoy in the South China Sea, meeting with heavy antiaircraft fire, badly damaging his plane. Because of the damage, once he was over land, he ordered the crew to bail out. One crewmember could not bail out because his parachute had been shredded by the enemy fire. Major Carswell remained at the controls to attempt a crash landing, but his Liberator struck a mountain and crashed in the attempt. He was awarded the Medal of Honor for his actions. Carswell Air Force Base, Texas was named in his honor.

The squadron moved to Rupsi Airfield, Assam, India in June 1945. Its mission again was primarily air transport as it ferried gasoline and supplies from there back into China. The unit sailed for the United States in October 1945, and it was inactivated at the Port of Embarkation on 6 January 1946.

=== Weather reconnaissance ===
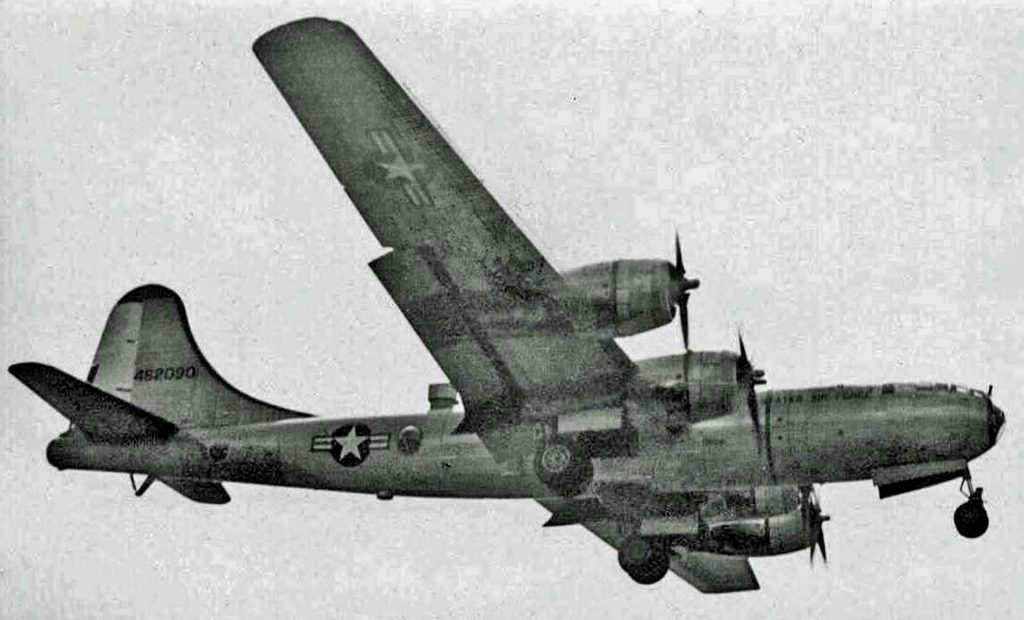
Boeing WB-29A

The squadron was reactivated at Fairfield-Suisun Army Air Field, California on 15 October 1947 as the 374th Reconnaissance Squadron, an Air Weather Service weather reconnaissance squadron, assuming the personnel and Boeing B-29 Superfortresses of the 55th Reconnaissance Squadron, which was simultaneously inactivated. The squadron performed weather reconnaissance, deploying elements to England and Saudi Arabia. In October 1949, the squadron moved to McClellan Air Force Base, California, where it was inactivated in February 1951 and its personnel and equipment transferred to the 55th Strategic Reconnaissance Squadron.

=== Strategic Air Command ===
==== Bomber operations ====
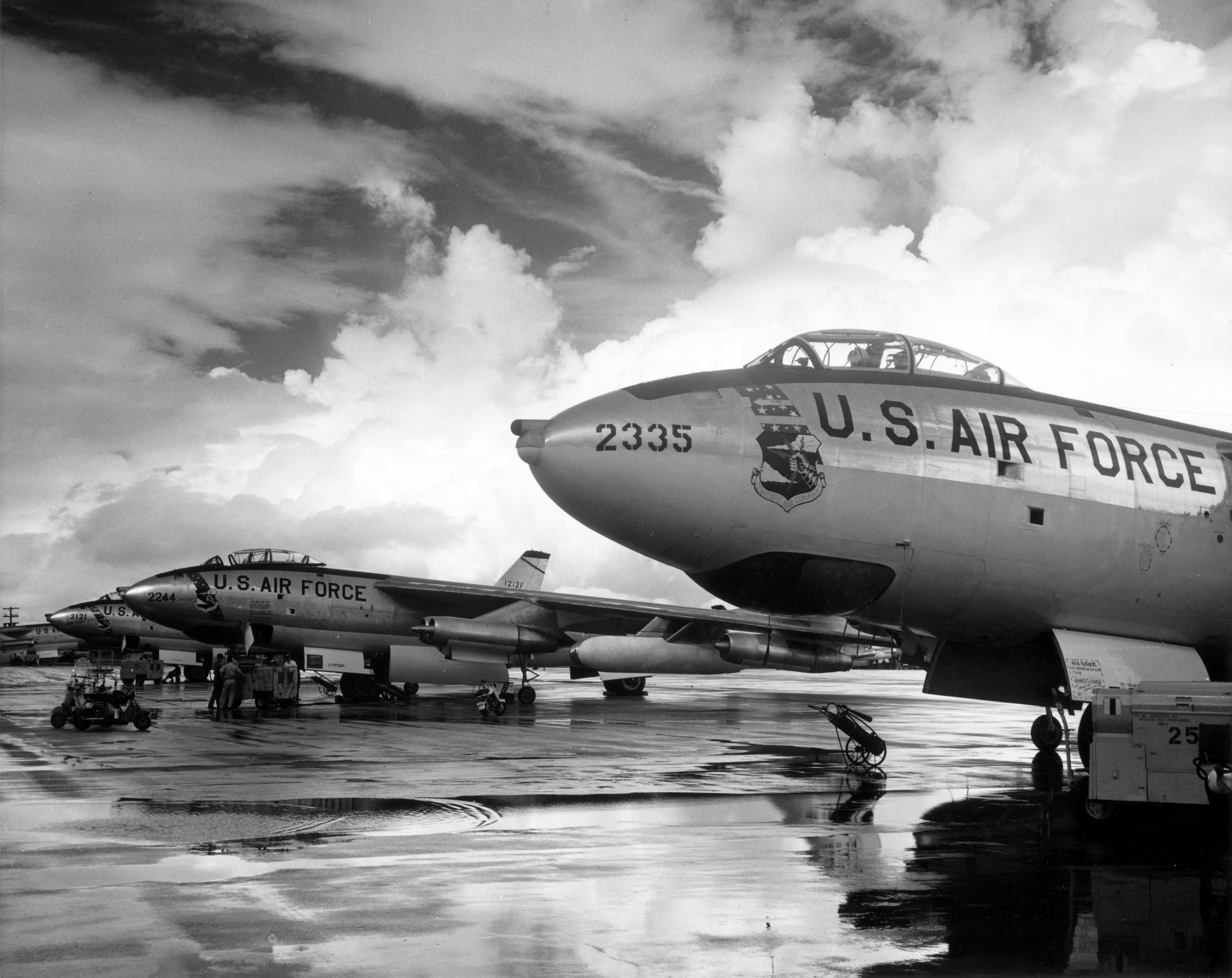
Strategic Air Command B-47 Stratojets as flown by the squadron

In October 1951, the squadron was activated, again as the 374th Bombardment Squadron, at Forbes Air Force Base, Kansas, but did not become operational until 10 November with B-29 Superfortress bombers. Although assigned to the 308th Bombardment Group, the group was a paper organization and the squadron was attached to other organizations until June 1952, (Note: Maurer indicates the squadron was attached to the 21st Air Division while stationed at Forbes. Ravenstein gives attachment to the 308th Bombardment Wing at both Forbes and Hunter.) when the group inactivated and the 374th was assigned directly to the 308th Bombardment Wing.

In April 1952, the squadron moved to Hunter Air Force Base, Georgia, and in 1953 began to equip with Boeing B-47 Stratojets. The squadron detached forces to bases in North Africa, and from 21 August until late October 1956, deployed with the entire 308th Wing to Sidi Slimane Air Base, Morocco. Overseas Operation Reflex alert operations began in October 1957. Reflex placed Stratojets and Boeing KC-97 Stratofreighters at bases closer to the Soviet Union for 90 day periods, although individuals rotated back to home bases during unit Reflex deployments.

As the Soviet Union built up its strategic bomber force in the 1950s, defense planners studied ways to defend against a surprise attack. Strategic Air Command (SAC) proposed keeping its bombers and supporting tankers on ground alert with weapons loaded and crews ready for takeoff. General Thomas S. Power, the commander of SAC, announced a goal of maintaining one third of SAC’s planes on fifteen minute ground alert, fully fueled and ready for combat. From November 1956 to October 1957, the squadron participated in Operation Try Out to test the feasibility of the alert concept. Following two additional tests, the plan was implemented, reducing the amount of time the squadron spent on alert at overseas bases.

In July 1959 SAC began a test of a "super wing" at Hunter. In this test, all B-47s at Hunter were transferred to the 2d Bombardment Wing and the squadron, along with other elements of the 308th Wing, became nonoperational. The squadron continued in this status until it was inactivated on 25 June 1961.

==== Intercontinental ballistic missile operations ====
The squadron was reactivated and redesignated as the 374th Strategic Missile Squadron, a SAC LGM-25C Titan II intercontinental ballistic missile squadron in 1962. It operated nine Titan II underground silos, construction of which began in 1960; the first (374–9), being operationally ready on 28 Oct 1963. The nine missile silos controlled by the 374th Strategic Missile Squadron remained on alert for over 20 years during the Cold War. The 1980 Damascus Titan missile explosion is a 'Broken Arrow' incident occurred at site 374–7 on 19 September 1980 which killed one airman and injured twenty-one personnel in the immediate vicinity (see below).

The squadron operated nine missile sites:

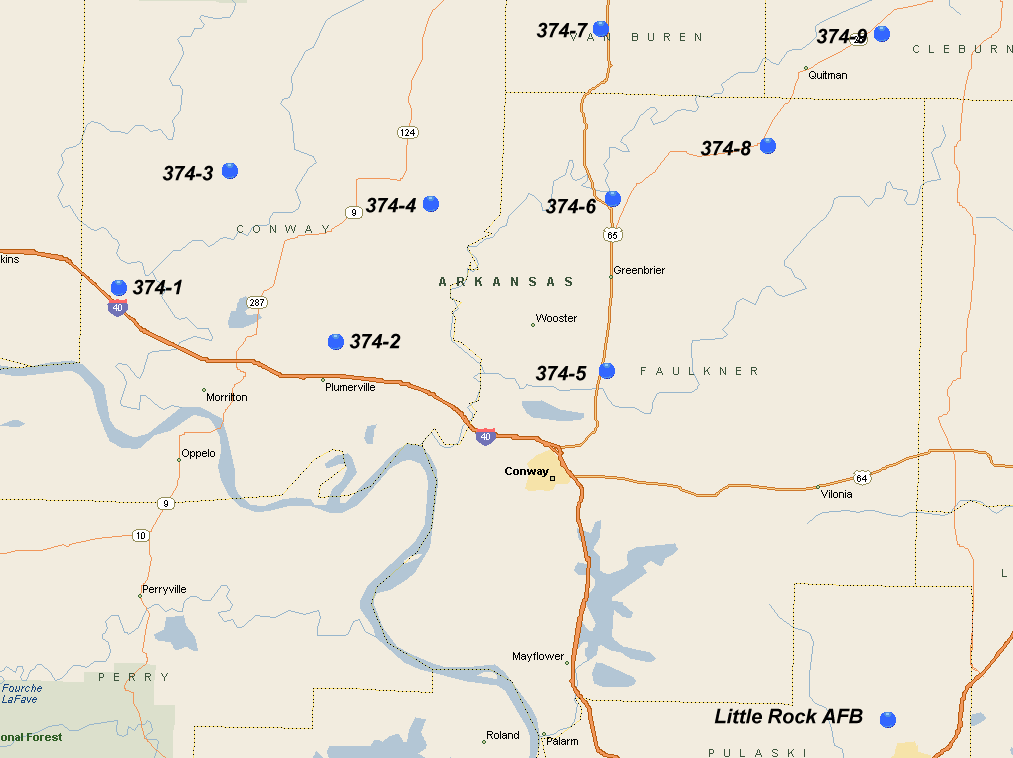
LGM-25C Titan II Sites

374-1 (23 Dec 1963 – 15 Aug 1985), 1.1 mi ENE of Blackwell, Arkansas 35°13′36″N 092°49′18″W
374-2 (19 Dec 1963 – 15 Aug 1986), 2.0 mi NNE of Plumerville, Arkansas 35°11′19″N 092°37′50″W
374-3 (19 Dec 1963 – 5 Aug 1986), 3.9 mi ENE of Hattieville, Arkansas 35°18′41″N 092°43′25″W
374-4 (28 Dec 1963 – 15 Aug 1986), 1.4 mi NNE of Springfield, Arkansas 35°17′15″N 092°32′50″W
374-5 (26 Dec 1963 – 19 May 1986), 3.3 mi ESE of Wooster, Arkansas 35°10′04″N 092°23′33″W
374-6 (18 Dec 1963 – 25 Jun 1986), 3.8 mi SW of Guy, Arkansas 35°17′30″N 092°23′12″W
374-7 (18 Dec 1963 – 21 Sep 1980)*, 3.3 mi NNE of Damascus, Arkansas 35°24′50″N 092°23′50″W
374-8 (20 Dec 1963 – 17 Mar 1985), 4.3 mi SSW of Quitman, Arkansas 35°19′45″N 092°14′59″W
374-9 (28 Oct 1963 – 3 Oct 1985), 2.5 mi SSW of Pearson, AR 35°24′34″N 092°08′58″W

In October 1981, President Ronald Reagan announced that as part of the strategic modernization program, the Titan II systems were to be retired by 1 October 1987. Inactivation of the sites began on 17 March 1985 with 374-8 being the first; the last was on 15 Aug 1986 involving 374–1, 374–4 and 374–2. The squadron was inactivated the same day.

After removal from service, the silos had reusable equipment removed by Air Force personnel, and contractors retrieved salvageable metals before destroying the silos with explosives and filling them in. Access to the vacated control centers was blocked off. Missile sites were later sold off to private ownership after demilitarization. Today the remains of the sites are still visible through aerial imagery, in various states of use or dereliction.

===== Launch Complex 374-7 incident =====
On 18 September 1980 at Launch Complex 374–7, a 308th Missile Maintenance Squadron airman was adding pressure to the second stage oxidizer tank. The airman accidentally dropped the socket wrench he was using, which fell down the silo and punctured the pressurized first stage fuel tank containing aerozine 50. The crew evacuated the launch control center as military and civilian response teams arrived to tackle the hazardous situation. Early in the morning of 19 September, an investigation team entered the silo. Because their vapor detectors indicated an explosive atmosphere, they were ordered to evacuate.

At about 0300 hours, a tremendous explosion rocked the area. The catapulted the 740-ton silo door away from the silo and ejected the second stage and warhead. Once clear of the silo, the second stage exploded. The warhead safety devices performed as designed and it did not explode. Twenty-one people in the vicinity of the blast were injured and one member of the investigation team sustained fatal injuries. At daybreak, the Air Force retrieved the warhead and took it to Little Rock Air Force Base. During the recovery, the Missile Wing Commander received strong support from other military units as well as Federal, state, and local officials. Arkansas's governor, Bill Clinton, played an important role in overseeing the proper deployment of state emergency resources.

== Lineage ==
- Constituted as the 374th Bombardment Squadron (Heavy) on 28 January 1942

Activated on 15 April 1942.
Redesignated 374th Bombardment Squadron, Heavy on 20 August 1943
Inactivated on 6 January 1946
Redesignated 374th Reconnaissance Squadron (Very Long Range, Weather) on 16 September 1947.
Activated on 15 October 1947
Inactivated on 21 February 1951
Redesignated 374th Bombardment Squadron, Medium on 4 October 1951
Activated on 10 October 1951
Discontinued and inactivated on 25 June 1961
Redesignated 374th Strategic Missile Squadron (ICBM-Titan) and activated on 24 January 1962 (not organized)
Organized on 1 September 1962
Inactivated on 15 August 1986

=== Assignments ===
- 308th Bombardment Group, 15 April 1942 – 6 January 1946
- 7th Weather Group (later 2107th Air Weather Group), 15 October 1947 – 21 February 1951
- 308th Bombardment Group, 10 October 1951 (attached to 21st Air Division until 17 April 1952, then to 308th Bombardment Wing)
- 308th Bombardment Wing, 16 June 1952 – 25 June 1961 (not operational after 15 July 1959)
- 308th Strategic Missile Wing, 1 September 1962 – 15 August 1986

=== Stations ===
- Gowen Field, Idaho, 15 April 1942
- Davis-Monthan Field, Arizona, 18 June 1942
- Alamogordo Army Air Field, New Mexico, 24 July 1942
- Davis-Monthan Field, Arizona, 28 August 1942
- Wendover Field, Utah, 1 October 1942
- Pueblo Army Air Base, Colorado, 30 November 1942 – 2 January 1943
- Chengkung Airfield, China, 20 March 1943
- Kwanghan Airfield, China, 18 February 1945
- Rupsi Airfield, India, 27 June – 14 October 1945
- Camp Kilmer, New Jersey, 5–6 January 1946
- Fairfield-Suisun Army Air Field (later Fairfield-Suisun Air Force Base), California, 15 October 1947 (one flight operated from Lincolnshire, England, 22 November 1948 – 15 May 1949)
- McClellan Air Force Base, California, 25 October 1949 – 21 February 1951 (flights operated from Dhahran Airfield, Saudi Arabia, 8 May 1948 – 4 December 1950; and Eielson Air Force Base, Alaska, 3 July – 28 September 1950)
- Forbes Air Force Base, Kansas, 10 October 1951
- Hunter Air Force Base, Georgia, 17 April 1952
- Plattsburgh Air Force Base, New York, 15 July 1959 – 25 June 1961
- Little Rock Air Force Base, Arkansas, 1 Sep 1962 – 15 Aug 1986

=== Aircraft and missiles ===
- Douglas B-18 Bolo, 1942
- Consolidated B-24 Liberator, 1942–1945
- Boeing B-29 Superfortress, 1947–1951, 1951–1952
- Boeing WB-29 Superfortress, 1947–1951
- Boeing RB-29 Superfortress, 1947–1951
- Douglas C-47 Skytrain, 1947–1951
- Boeing B-47 Stratojet, 1953–1959
- LGM-25C Titan II, 1962–1986

=== Awards and campaigns ===
Award streamer	Award	Dates	Notes
	Distinguished Unit Citation	21 August 1943	China, 374th Bombardment Squadron
	Distinguished Unit Citation	24 May 1944–28 April 1945	East and South China Seas, Straits of Formosa and Gulf of Tonkin, 374th Bombardment Squadron
	Air Force Outstanding Unit Award	1 November 1956–1 April 1957	374th Bombardment Squadron
	Air Force Outstanding Unit Award	1 July 1967–30 June 1968	374th Strategic Missile Squadron
	Air Force Outstanding Unit Award	1 July 1972–30 June 1974	374th Strategic Missile Squadron
	Air Force Outstanding Unit Award	1 July 1984–30 June 1985	374th Strategic Missile Squadron
	Air Force Outstanding Unit Award	1 July 1985–30 June 1987	374th Strategic Missile Squadron

Campaign Streamer	Campaign	Dates	Notes
	Air Offensive, Japan	20 Mar 1943–2 September 1945	374th Bombardment Squadron
	Air Combat, Asiatic–Pacific Theater	20 March 1943-19 December 1945	374th Bombardment Squadron
	New Guinea	20 Mar 1943–31 December 1944	374th Bombardment Squadron
	China Defensive	20 Mar 1943–4 May 1945	374th Bombardment Squadron
	India-Burma	2 April 1943–28 January 1945	374th Bombardment Squadron
	Western Pacific	17 April 1945–2 September 1945	374th Bombardment Squadron
	China Offensive	5 May 1945–2 September 1945	374th Bombardment Squadron

== See also ==
- Titan II ICBM Launch Complex 374-5 Site
- List of United States Air Force missile squadrons
- B-24 Liberator units of the United States Army Air Forces
- List of B-29 Superfortress operators
- List of B-47 units of the United States Air Force
