= Woolly Hollow State Park =

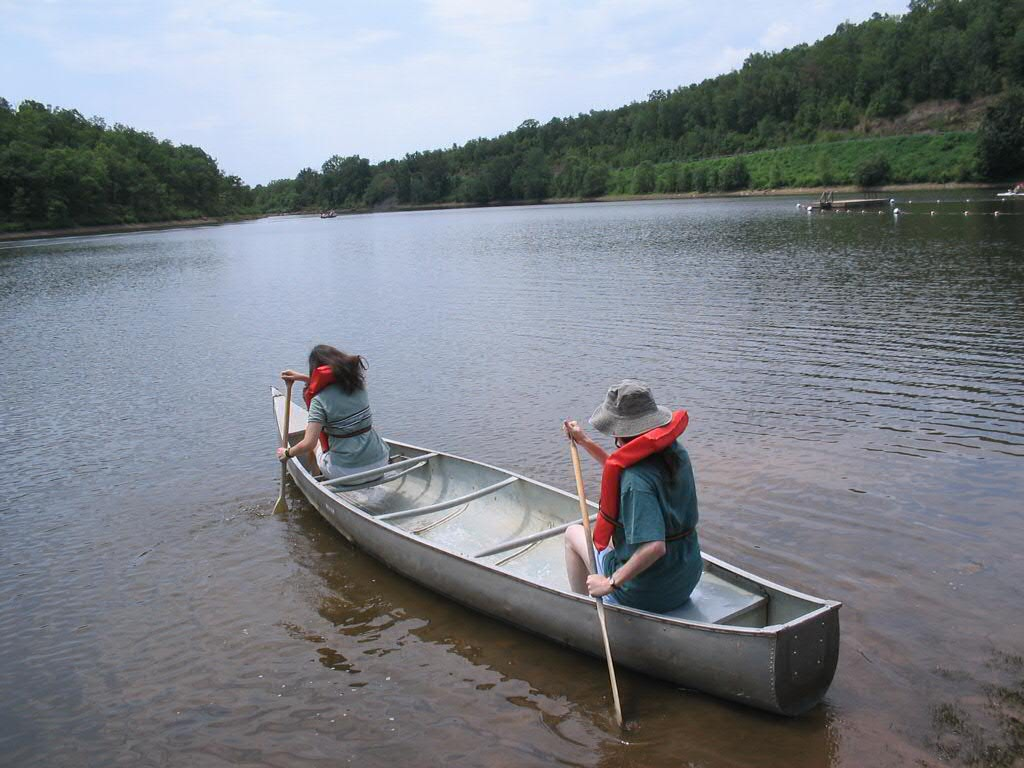
- Canoeing on Bennett Lake

- Location within Arkansas Location within the United States
- Interactive map of Woolly Hollow State Park
- Location: Faulkner County, Arkansas, United States
- Coordinates: 35°17′17″N 92°17′21″W
- Area: 370 acres (150 ha)
- Elevation: 535 ft (163 m)
- Established: 1973
- Administrator: Arkansas Department of Parks, Heritage and Tourism
- Named for: Woolly family homestead
- Website: Official website
- Arkansas State Parks

Woolly Hollow State Park is a 370-acre (150 ha) Arkansas state park in Faulkner County, near Greenbrier, Arkansas in the United States. The park was built and is based on a dam lake, Bennett Lake, built by the Civilian Conservation Corps (CCC) located at nearby Camp Halsey and Works Progress Administration (WPA) beginning in 1933. Access to the park is available from Arkansas Highway 285.

== History ==
Originally, the land was a homestead by the Woolly family, and a restored cabin is on the property. The area was used by Dr. Hugh Bennett for soil studies in the 1930s. The CCC and WPA built a dam and lake, and it was used for watershed research. later named for Bennett. Before becoming a state park, the area was known as Centerville County Park.

== Recreation ==
Woolly Hollow State Park is home to the Huckleberry Trail, completed in 1935 by the CCC, the trail circles Bennett Lake. The park also features around 10 miles of mountain bike trail for enthusiasts, consisting of a North Loop (4.9 miles) and a South Loop (5.2 miles). It was restored in 1981. The park also features 40 camp sites and a bathhouse.
