= Titan II ICBM Launch Complex 374-5 Site =

- U.S. National Register of Historic Places
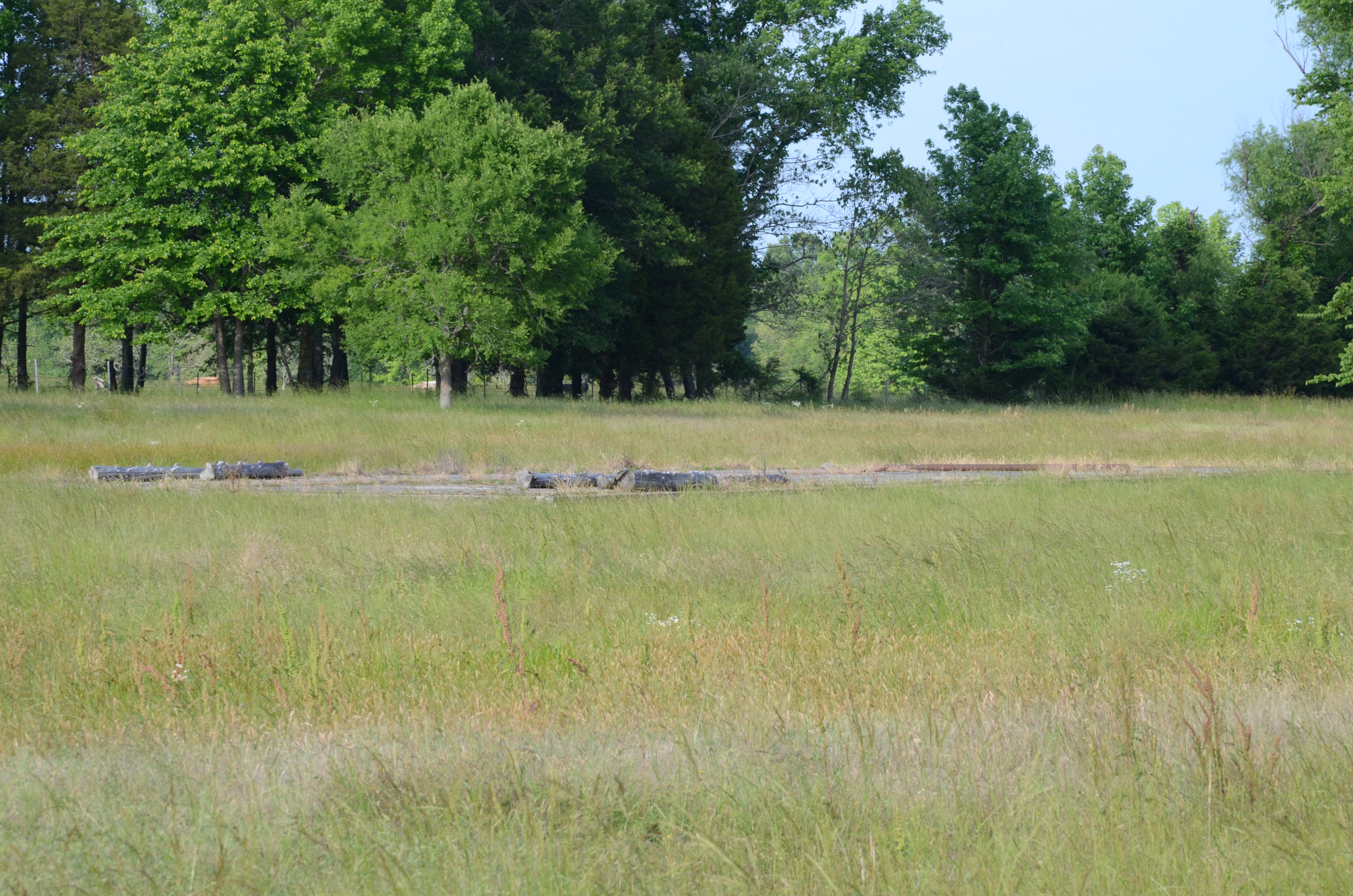

- Location within Arkansas Location within the United States
- Nearest city: Springhill, Faulkner County, Arkansas
- Coordinates: 35°10′04″N 92°23′33″W
- Area: 10 acres (4.0 ha)
- Built: 1963
- Built by: U.S. Army Corps of Engineers
- MPS: Cold War Resources Associated with the 308th Strategic Missile Wing in Arkansas MPS
- NRHP reference No.: 98001433
- Added to NRHP: 18 February 2000

The Titan II ICBM Launch Complex 374-5 Site is a historic military installation in rural Faulkner County, Arkansas. It is located roughly midway between Greenbrier and Conway, on the east side of United States Route 65 about 0.4 miles (0.64 km) north of its junction with East Cadron Ridge Road. It is an underground complex on 10 acres (4.0 ha) of land, featuring a missile silo and launch control facility. Its ground-level access points have been back-filled with rubble or welded shut, and are discernible only by the presence of concrete pads and mounds of earth. Surface features also include the remnants of a helicopter pad and a theodolite siting marker, and the original access road to the facility from US 65. The facility was staffed by the 374th Strategic Missile Squadron between 1963 and 1986, housing an LGM-25C Titan II ICBM, and was decommissioned and rendered non-functional in 1987 under the terms of the SALT II strategic arms treaty.

The site was listed on the National Register of Historic Places in 2000.

== See also ==
- Titan II ICBM Launch Complex 373-5 Site
- Titan II ICBM Launch Complex 374-7 Site
- National Register of Historic Places listings in Faulkner County, Arkansas
