= Arkansas Highway 285 =

State highway in Arkansas, United States

Highway 285
- AR 285 highlighted in red

Route information
- Maintained by ArDOT

Section 1
- Length: 6.17 mi (9.93 km)
- South end: US 65 / AR 25 near Greenbrier
- North end: Woolly Hollow State Park

Section 2
- Length: 9.90 mi (15.93 km)
- South end: AR 25 in Wooster
- North end: AR 124 at Martinville

Section 3
- Length: 4.86 mi (7.82 km)
- South end: US 65 in Damascus
- North end: AR 92 at Rabbit Ridge

Location
- Country: United States
- State: Arkansas

Highway system
- Arkansas Highway System; Interstate; US; State; Business; Spurs; Suffixed; Scenic; Heritage
← AR 284	→ AR 286

Highway 285 (AR 285, Ark. 285, and Hwy. 285) is a designation for three north–south state highways in central Arkansas. One route of 6.17 miles (9.93 km) runs north from US Route 65 near Greenbrier to Woolly Hollow State Park in Faulkner County. A second route of 9.90 miles (15.93 km) begins at Highway 25 in Wooster and runs north to Highway 124 at Martinville, also in Faulkner County. A third segment runs north from US 65 in Damascus to Highway 92 at Rabbit Ridge in Van Buren County.

== Route description ==
=== Greenbrier to Woolly Hollow State Park ===
The route begins north of Greenbrier in Faulkner County at US Route 65 (US 65) near the historic Merritt House listed on the National Register of Historic Places (NRHP). Highway 285 winds east through a sparsely populated area of the county before terminating at Woolly Hollow Road, which serves as the entrance to Woolly Hollow State Park. The roadway continues east as Blythe Road under county maintenance.

=== Wooster to Martinville ===
Highway 285 begins in Wooster at Highway 25. The highway winds north to Shady Grove where it serves as the southern terminus for Highway 225. Highway 285 continues north through Bono and Twin Groves before terminating at Highway 124 near Martinville.

=== Damascus to Rabbit Ridge ===
Highway 285 begins in southern Van Buren County at US 65 in Damascus. The route runs west past the Damascus Gymnasium and Melvin Chrisco House, both listed on the NRHP, before exiting the corporate limits. Continuing west, the highway turns due north and terminates at Highway 92 at the unincorporated community of Rabbit Ridge. It does not intersect any other state highways along its route.

== Major intersections ==
County	Location	mi	km	Destinations	Notes
Faulkner		0.00	0.00	US 65 (AR 25) – Conway, Clinton	Southern terminus
Faulkner	Woolly Hollow State Park	6.17	9.93	End state maintenance at Woolly Hollow Rd	Northern terminus
Faulkner	Highway 285 begins in Wooster				
Faulkner	Wooster	0.00	0.00	AR 25 (Reed Rd) – Conway, Greenbrier	Southern terminus
Faulkner	Shady Grove	2.43	3.91	AR 225 north (Reed Rd) – Greenbrier	AR 225 southern terminus
Faulkner	Martinville	9.90	15.93	AR 124 – Springfield, Damascus	Northern terminus
Highway 285 begins in Damascus
Van Buren	Damascus	0.00	0.00	US 65 (Broadway St) – Clinton, Conway	Southern terminus
Van Buren	Rabbit Ridge	4.86	7.82	AR 92 – Bee Branch, Center Ridge	Northern terminus
1.000 mi = 1.609 km; 1.000 km = 0.621 mi
