= Perkins High School =

Perkins High School may refer to:

- Perkins High School (Sandusky, Ohio), Perkins Township, Ohio
- Perkins-Tryon High School, Perkins, Oklahoma
- Guy–Perkins High School, Guy, Arkansas
