= Benton Township, Arkansas =

Benton Township, Arkansas may refer to:

- Benton Township, Faulkner County, Arkansas
- Benton Township, Fulton County, Arkansas

== See also ==
- List of townships in Arkansas
- Benton Township (disambiguation)
