= Perkins School =

Perkins School may refer to:

- Perkins School for the Blind, Watertown, Massachusetts
- Perkins School of Theology at Southern Methodist University
- Humphrey Perkins School, Leicestershire
- Perkins High School (disambiguation), various locations
- Perkins Local School District, Ohio
