= Guy–Perkins School District =

School district in Arkansas, United States

Location
- 492 AR 25 North; Guy, Arkansas 72061 United States
- Coordinates: 35°19′32″N 92°19′23″W

District information
- Type: Public (government funded)
- Grades: PK–12
- Schools: 2
- NCES District ID: 0507140

Students and staff
- Students: 303 (2021-2022)
- Teachers: 37.31 (on FTE basis)(2021-2022)
- Staff: 21.35 (on FTE basis)(2021-2022)
- Student–teacher ratio: 8.12 (2021-2022)
- District mascot: Thunderbird
- Colors: Blue; Gold

Other information
- Website: www.gptbirds.org

Guy–Perkins School District is a public school district based in Guy, Arkansas, United States. The school district encompasses 46.38 square miles (120.1 km^{2}) of land serving all or portions of the Faulkner County communities in and around Guy, Twin Groves, Greenbrier, Damascus, and Quitman.

Guy–Perkins School District employs over more than 80 faculty and staff on a full time equivalent basis to provide educational programs for students ranging from prekindergarten through twelfth grade at its consolidated facility serving its elementary and secondary schools that enroll more than 450 students. The Guy–Perkins School District is a member of the Arch Ford Education Service Cooperative.

All schools in the district are accredited by the Arkansas Department of Education.

== History ==
Guy–Perkins School District was formed in 1930 as a result of consolidation of nine small schools in proximity of Guy - Chinquapin, Cooperage Springs, Wolf Branch, Old Texas, Hendrickson, Hicks, Rowlett, Solomon Grove and Perkins. As a condition of consolidation, Perkins residents demanded that the grade school remain in Perkins and that the district name include Perkins, and so was created the Guy–Perkins School District. The grade school did move to Guy in 1936 and the school district ran well without major controversy until 1948 when the state required that all schools districts must have at least 350 students in attendance, a figure that was well above the district's attendance. Subsequently, the school district merged with several black schools, although attendance remained segregated until the 1960s.

== Schools ==
=== Secondary schools ===
- Guy–Perkins High School: Grades 7–12

=== Elementary schools ===
- Guy–Perkins Elementary School: Grades PK–6
