= Matthews Township =

Matthews Township may refer to:

- Matthews Township, Faulkner County, Arkansas in Faulkner County, Arkansas
- Matthews Township, Chatham County, North Carolina in Chatham County, North Carolina
