= Springhill, Faulkner County, Arkansas =

United States place

Springhill, Arkansas
- Unincorporated community
- Location within Arkansas Location within the United States
- Coordinates: 35°11′19″N 92°23′33″W
- Country: United States
- State: Arkansas
- County: Faulkner
- Elevation: 371 ft (113 m)
- Time zone: UTC-6 (Central (CST))
  - Summer (DST): UTC-5 (CDT)
- Area code: 501
- GNIS feature ID: 78437

Springhill is an unincorporated community in Faulkner County, Arkansas, United States. The community is located at the junction of U.S. Route 65 and Arkansas Highway 287, 3 miles (4.8 km) south of Greenbrier.

The Titan II ICBM Launch Complex 374-5 Site, which is listed on the National Register of Historic Places, is near the community.

== Education ==
Public education for elementary and secondary school students is primarily provided by the Greenbrier School District, beginning at the district's Springhill Elementary School and leading to graduation from Greenbrier High School.
