= Arkansas Highway 287 =

State highway in Arkansas, United States

Highway 287
- AR 287 highlighted in red

Route information
- Maintained by ArDOT

Section 1
- Length: 4.84 mi (7.79 km)
- West end: AR 9
- East end: AR 92

Section 2
- Length: 9.03 mi (14.53 km)
- South end: AR 9, Solgohachia
- North end: AR 95, Prairie View

Location
- Country: United States
- State: Arkansas
- Counties: Conway

Highway system
- Arkansas Highway System; Interstate; US; State; Business; Spurs; Suffixed; Scenic; Heritage
← AR 286	→ AR 288

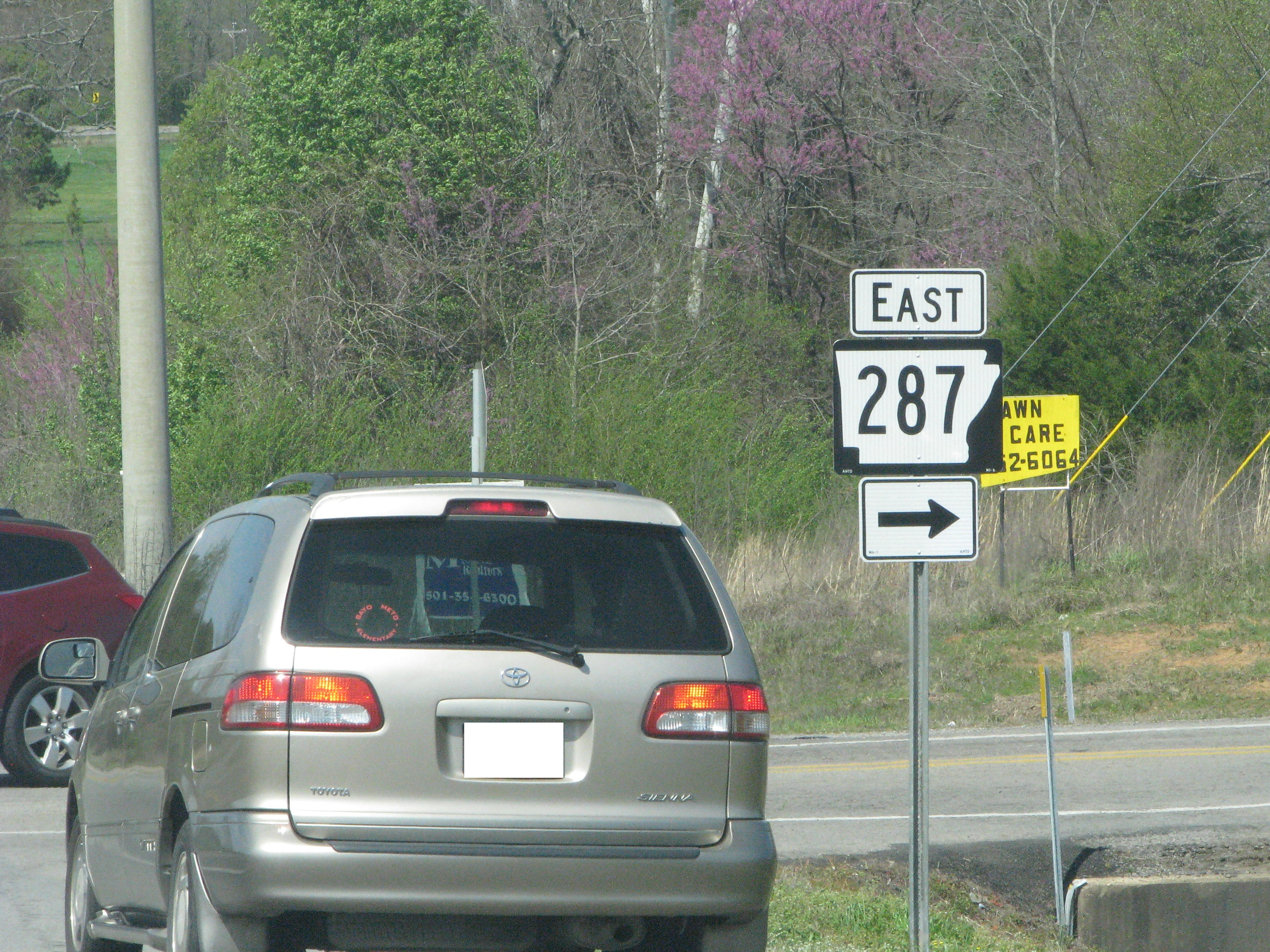
Arkansas Highway 287 begins just north of Morrilton

Arkansas Highway 287 (AR 287 and Hwy. 287) is a designation for three state highways in Conway and Faulkner Counties, Arkansas . One segment of 4.84 miles (7.79 km) runs east–west from Arkansas Highway 9 near Morrilton east to Arkansas Highway 92. A second segment of 9.03 miles (14.53 km) runs north–south connecting Highway 9 to Arkansas Highway 95.

The third segment of 12.0 miles (19.31 km) runs east-west from U.S. Route 65 near Greenbrier east to Arkansas Highway 36 in Holland.

== Route description ==
=== Morrilton to Highway 92 ===
AR 287 begins at AR 9 just north of Morrilton and an interchange with Interstate 40. The route runs past the Oak Grove Cemetery before terminating at AR 92 north of Plumerville. A second segment of 9.03 miles (14.53 km) runs north–south connecting Highway 9 to Arkansas Highway 95. The road is two–lane undivided for its entire length.

=== Solgohachia to Highway 95 ===
The highway begins at the unincorporated community of Solgohachia at Highway 9. AR 287 heads north through the communities of McClaren and Lanty before it terminates at AR 95. The road is two–lane undivided for its entire length.

=== U.S. Highway 65 to Holland ===
The highway begins at the unincorporated community of Springhill, south of Greenbrier, at US-65. AR-287 heads east to enter Holland before turning south to terminate at Arkansas Highway 36. The road is two-lane undivided for its entire length.

== Major intersections ==
The entire route is in Conway County.

Location	mi	km	Destinations	Notes
	0.00	0.00	AR 9 – Morrilton, Center Ridge	Western terminus
	4.84	7.79	AR 92 – Springfield, Plumerville	Eastern terminus
AR 287 northern segment begins at AR 9
Solgohachia	0.00	0.00	AR 9 – Birdtown, Morrilton	Southern terminus
	9.03	14.53	AR 95 – Clinton, Morrilton	Northern terminus
1.000 mi = 1.609 km; 1.000 km = 0.621 mi

== See also ==
- Solgohachia Bridge, bridge listed on the National Register of Historic Places near Solgohachia
