= Greenbrier School District =

School district based in Greenbrier, Arkansas, United States

Location
- 4 School Drive; Greenbrier, Arkansas 72734 United States

District information
- Grades: PK–12
- Superintendent: Scott Spainhour
- Accreditation: ADE; AdvancED (2009–)
- Schools: 7
- NCES District ID: 0506900

Students and staff
- Students: 3,147
- Teachers: 201.52 (on FTE basis)
- Staff: 394.52 (on FTE basis)
- Student–teacher ratio: 15.62
- Athletic conference: 5A West (2012–14)
- District mascot: Panthers
- Colors: Royal blue White

Other information
- Website: www.greenbrierschools.org

Greenbrier School District 19 (GSD) is a school district based in Greenbrier, Arkansas, United States. GSD supports more than 3,100 students in kindergarten through grade 12 and employs more than 390 faculty and staff on a full time equivalent basis for its six schools.

The school district encompasses 141.38 square miles (366.2 km^{2}) of land in Faulkner County and Conway County.

In Faulkner County it serves Greenbrier, Wooster, the majority of Holland, a small section of Twin Groves, a and a very small part of Conway. The district also includes Springhill.

== Schools ==
The Greenbrier School District and all of its schools are accredited by the Arkansas Department of Education (ADE) but not by AdvancED (formerly North Central Association).

=== Secondary schools ===
Interscholastic athletic activities for the middle, junior high and high schools are not administered by the Arkansas Activities Association. Greenbrier High School is the home of the pilot program that formed the national EAST Initiative. Greenbrier is affiliated with the Conway Area Career Center to support the students' career and technical education needs.

- Greenbrier High School, serving grades 10 through 12.
- Greenbrier Junior High School, serving grades 8 and 9.
- Greenbrier Middle School, serving grades 6 and 7.

=== Elementary schools ===
- Greenbrier Eastside Elementary School, serving prekindergarten through grade 5.
- Greenbrier Springhill Elementary School, serving kindergarten through grade 5.
- Greenbrier Westside Elementary School, serving prekindergarten through grade 5.
- Greenbrier Wooster Elementary School, serving kindergarten through grade 5.

== Awards and recognition ==
In 2011, Greenbrier School District and its high school were recognized in the AP District of the Year Awards program in the College Board's 2nd Annual Honor Roll that consisted schools which increased or had the same the rate at which their AP students earned scores of 3 or higher on an AP Exam as well as those which offered more exams to students.

In 2012, Greenbrier is ranked No. 968 of 2008 high schools in the Challenge Index high school scoring system and ranked 50th in Arkansas with an index score of 2.677, which is the number of college-level tests given at a school in 2011 divided by the number of graduates that year.

== Notable Controversies ==
In 2018, the Greenbrier School District came into national prominence for the punishment of student protestors via paddling. Three students joined the nationwide school walk-out in March 2018, and were given a choice between suspension or corporal punishment as a consequence.
