= Arkansas Highway 286 =

State highway in Arkansas, United States

Highway 286
- AR 286 highlighted in red

Route information
- Maintained by ArDOT
- Length: 6.48 mi (10.43 km)

Major junctions
- West end: I-40 / US 65 / US 65B in Conway
- East end: Clinton Road at Saltillo

Location
- Country: United States
- State: Arkansas
- Counties: Faulkner

Highway system
- Arkansas Highway System; Interstate; US; State; Business; Spurs; Suffixed; Scenic; Heritage
← AR 285	→ AR 287

Arkansas Highway 286 (AR 286) is an east–west state highway in Faulkner County, Arkansas. The route of 6.48 miles (10.43 km) runs from Interstate 40 (I-40) in Conway east to Saltillo.

== Route description ==
The route begins at an interchange with I-40/US 65 as a continuation of US 65B. Running west on the overpass, Highway 286 runs east as Dave Ward Drive before winding along the northern edge of Lake Conway. The highway continues east to Saltillo, where it continues as Clinton Road.

== Major intersections ==
The entire route is in Faulkner County.

Location	mi	km	Destinations	Notes
Conway	0.00	0.00	US 65B north (Dave Ward Drive)	Continuation north
Conway	0.00	0.00	I-40 (US 65) – Little Rock, Fort Smith	Exit 129A on I-40
Saltillo	6.48	10.43	Clinton Road	Continuation south
1.000 mi = 1.609 km; 1.000 km = 0.621 mi
