= Holland, Arkansas =

- City
- Location of Holland in Faulkner County, Arkansas.
- Coordinates: 35°9′28″N 92°16′50″W
- Country: United States
- State: Arkansas
- County: Faulkner

Area
  - City: 6.73 sq mi (17.43 km^{2})
  - Land: 6.73 sq mi (17.43 km^{2})
  - Water: 0 sq mi (0.00 km^{2})
- Elevation: 361 ft (110 m)

Population (2020)
  - City: 586
  - Estimate (2025): 602 ▲
  - Density: 87.0/sq mi (33.61/km^{2})
  - Metro: 748,031
- Time zone: UTC-6 (Central (CST))
  - Summer (DST): UTC-5 (CDT)
- ZIP code: 72173
- Area code: 501
- FIPS code: 05-32710
- GNIS feature ID: 2404711
- Website: hollandar.com

Holland is a city in Faulkner County, Arkansas, United States. As of the 2020 census, Holland had a population of 586. It is part of the Central Arkansas region.

Holland gained media attention after 13-year-old Kacie Woody was reported missing from her home in this area in 2002; an investigation revealed that she was abducted by a California man she befriended online while he had pretended to be a teen boy. The next day their bodies were found inside a storage unit in Conway, after he had fatally shot her and later himself. Woody's father then founded the Kacie Woody Foundation in order to educate parents and children about Internet safety.

== Geography ==
Holland is located just east of the center of Faulkner County. Holland Hill, a low ridge, forms a rough semi-circle around the northern, eastern, and southern sides of town. Arkansas Highway 287 passes through the town, leading west 8 miles (13 km) to U.S. Route 65 at Springhill and south 3 miles (5 km) to Arkansas Highway 36. Conway, the county seat, is 14 miles (23 km) to the southwest of Holland.

According to the United States Census Bureau, Holland has a total area of 6.9 square miles (17.9 km^{2}), all land.

== Demographics ==
Historical population
Census	Pop.	Note	%±
2000	577		—
2010	557		−3.5%
2020	586		5.2%
2025 (est.)	602	▲	2.7%
U.S. Decennial Census

As of the census of 2000, there were 577 people, 217 households, and 164 families residing in the city. The population density was 83.9 inhabitants per square mile (32.4/km^{2}). There were 235 housing units at an average density of 34.2 per square mile (13.2/km^{2}). The racial makeup of the city was 96.01% White, 1.39% Native American, 0.17% Pacific Islander, 0.17% from other races, and 2.25% from two or more races. 0.35% of the population were Hispanic or Latino of any race.

There were 217 households, out of which 36.9% had children under the age of 18 living with them, 57.1% were married couples living together, 12.4% had a female householder with no husband present, and 24.4% were non-families. 21.2% of all households were made up of individuals, and 10.1% had someone living alone who was 65 years of age or older. The average household size was 2.66 and the average family size was 3.01.

In the city, the population was spread out, with 28.4% under the age of 18, 8.8% from 18 to 24, 30.5% from 25 to 44, 19.2% from 45 to 64, and 13.0% who were 65 years of age or older. The median age was 32 years. For every 100 females, there were 107.6 males. For every 100 females age 18 and over, there were 104.5 males.

The median income for a household in the city was $32,368, and the median income for a family was $34,583. Males had a median income of $29,219 versus $20,982 for females. The per capita income for the city was $15,370. About 10.6% of families and 15.1% of the population were below the poverty line, including 21.1% of those under age 18 and 7.8% of those age 65 or over.

== Education ==
The majority of the city limits is in the Greenbrier School District. Small pieces extend into the Mount Vernon-Enola School District and the Conway Public Schools school district.

== Notable people ==
- Kacie Woody, murder victim
