= List of lakes of Faulkner County, Arkansas =

There are at least 38 named lakes and reservoirs in Faulkner County, Arkansas.

== Lakes ==
- Boone Pond, 34°57′38″N 092°20′53″W, el. 282 feet (86 m)
- Grassy Lake, 34°56′44″N 092°23′27″W, el. 256 feet (78 m)

== Reservoirs ==
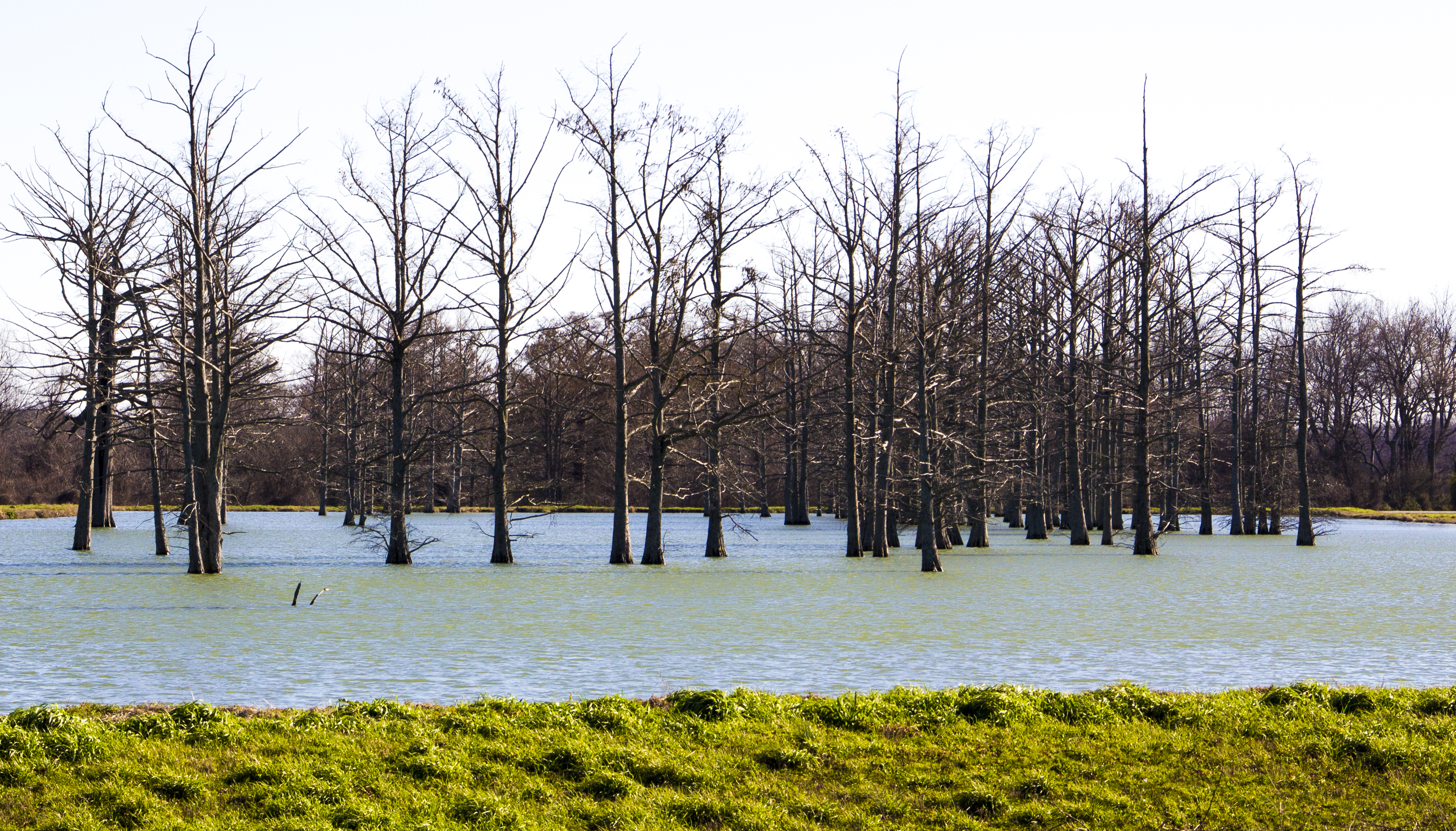
Lake Conway

- Indian Head Lake, 35°02′41″N 092°07′02″W, el. 335 feet (102 m)
- Bailey Lake, 35°01′22″N 092°12′54″W, el. 469 feet (143 m)
- Beaver Fork Lake, 35°08′08″N 092°26′14″W, el. 295 feet (90 m)
- Bivans Lake, 35°18′42″N 092°16′37″W, el. 735 feet (224 m)
- Blacks Lake, 35°02′58″N 092°17′25″W, el. 302 feet (92 m)
- Blacks Lake Number Two, 35°02′26″N 092°16′57″W, el. 302 feet (92 m)
- Browns Lake, 34°59′24″N 092°34′37″W, el. 279 feet (85 m)
- Brushlake Reservoir, 34°58′28″N 092°14′24″W, el. 351 feet (107 m)
- Carter Lake, 35°01′19″N 092°26′12″W, el. 344 feet (105 m)
- Davis Lake, 34°59′10″N 092°28′30″W, el. 472 feet (144 m)
- Days Lake, 35°06′54″N 092°25′11″W, el. 404 feet (123 m)
- Dears Pond, 35°10′34″N 092°29′53″W, el. 276 feet (84 m)
- Deihl Lake, 35°06′12″N 092°14′59″W, el. 394 feet (120 m)
- Gentry Lake, 35°06′56″N 092°26′05″W, el. 453 feet (138 m)
- Jewell Lake, 34°57′46″N 092°28′28″W, el. 279 feet (85 m)
- Lake Bennett, 35°17′09″N 092°17′08″W, el. 509 feet (155 m)
- Lake Carol-Dan, 35°05′46″N 092°31′47″W, el. 295 feet (90 m)
- Lake Conway, 34°57′33″N 092°24′19″W, el. 259 feet (79 m)
- Lake Conway Nursery Pond, 34°59′24″N 092°23′01″W, el. 269 feet (82 m)
- Lawrences Lake, 35°12′44″N 092°24′39″W, el. 312 feet (95 m)
- Meers Lake, 34°58′31″N 092°17′04″W, el. 381 feet (116 m)
- Montgomery Lake, 35°17′51″N 092°19′36″W, el. 630 feet (190 m)
- Murray Lake, 34°52′01″N 092°27′50″W, el. 249 feet (76 m)
- Nalholz Lake, 35°07′42″N 092°13′45″W, el. 466 feet (142 m)
- Parks Lake, 35°02′51″N 092°18′24″W, el. 289 feet (88 m)
- Pool Eight, 35°04′36″N 092°32′19″W, el. 253 feet (77 m)
- Roberts Pond, 34°59′24″N 092°24′25″W, el. 269 feet (82 m)
- Robins Lake, 35°06′55″N 092°25′45″W, el. 453 feet (138 m)
- Stevens Lake, 34°59′55″N 092°31′20″W, el. 305 feet (93 m)
- Stone Lake, 34°57′54″N 092°28′06″W, el. 272 feet (83 m)
- Torian Lake, 35°09′45″N 092°29′44″W, el. 272 feet (83 m)
- Tupelo Bayou Site One Reservoir, 35°01′56″N 092°30′19″W, el. 272 feet (83 m)
- Tupelo Bayou Site Two Reservoir, 35°00′06″N 092°32′07″W, el. 259 feet (79 m)
- Watson Lake, 34°59′21″N 092°14′17″W, el. 449 feet (137 m)
- Williams Lake, 35°06′25″N 092°09′48″W, el. 374 feet (114 m)
- Wisley Lake, 34°57′44″N 092°30′24″W, el. 282 feet (86 m)

== See also ==
- List of lakes in Arkansas
