= Greenbrier High School (Arkansas) =

Location
- 72 Green Valley Drive; Greenbrier, Arkansas 72058; United States; 35°13′10″N 92°24′12″W

Information
- School type: Public (government funded)
- Status: Open
- School district: Greenbrier School District
- NCES District ID: 050690
- Authority: Arkansas Department of Education (ADE)
- Superintendent: Scott Spainhour
- CEEB code: 040935
- NCES School ID: 050690000418
- Principal: Andrew Roberson
- Staff: 51.49 (FTE)
- Grades: 10–12
- Enrollment: 814 (2023-24)
- Student to teacher ratio: 15.42
- Education system: ADE Smart Core curriculum
- Classes offered: Regular; Career Focus; Advanced Placement
- Hours in school day: 7
- Colors: Royal blue and white
- Athletics conference: 5A West (2024–26)
- Mascot: Panther
- Team name: Greenbrier Panthers
- Feeder schools: Greenbrier Junior High School
- Affiliation: Arkansas Activities Association
- Website: www.greenbrierschools.org/greenbrier-high-school-home

Greenbrier High School (GHS) is a comprehensive public high school serving more than 600 students in grades ten through twelve in Greenbrier, Arkansas, United States. It is one of six public high schools in Faulkner County and is the sole high school administered by the Greenbrier School District. Greenbrier High School is the home of the pilot program that formed the national EAST Initiative.

The district includes Greenbrier, Wooster, Springhill, most of Holland, and portions of Conway and Twin Groves.

== Academics ==
The school is accredited by the Arkansas Department of Education (ADE) and has been accredited by AdvancED (formerly North Central Association) since 1988.

=== Curriculum ===
The assumed course of study follows the Smart Core curriculum developed the Arkansas Department of Education (ADE), which requires students to complete 22 credit units before graduation. Students engage in regular and Advanced Placement (AP) coursework and exams. Greerbrier is affiliated with the Conway Area Career Center to support the students' career and technical education needs.

=== Awards and recognition ===
In 2011, Greenbrier School District and its high school were recognized in the AP District of the Year Awards program in the College Board's 2nd Annual Honor Roll that consisted of 367 U.S. public school districts (4 in Arkansas) that simultaneously achieved increases in access to AP® courses for a broader number of students and improved the rate at which their AP students earned scores of 3 or higher on an AP Exam.

== Extracurricular activities ==
The Greenbrier High School mascot is the panther with school colors of royal blue, black, and white.

=== Athletics ===
The Greenbrier Panthers participate in various interscholastic activities in the 5A West Conference administered by the Arkansas Activities Association. The school athletic activities include baseball, basketball (boys/girls), soccer (boys/girls), bowling, competitive cheer, cross country (boys/girls), football, golf (boys/girls), softball, swimming and diving (girls), tennis (boys/girls), volleyball, and wrestling (boy/girls).

The girls basketball team won three consecutive state championships (1956, 1957, 1958) with a state-record team tournament points of 288 in 1958. In 1985, Brian Wiedower pitched the first perfect game in a state baseball tournament.

In 2012, Greenbrier won the state's Student Angler Federation (SAF) High School Fishing State Championship.

=== Clubs and traditions ===
In 1995–96, first-year Greenbrier High School educator Tim Stephenson piloted a program that would go on to become the EAST (Environmental And Spatial Technologies) Initiative, which has grown to more than 200 high schools in Arkansas and other states.

== Notable incidents ==
On March 14, 2018, during the 2018 United States gun violence protests, three students elected to receive corporal punishment in the form of two paddlings on the thighs for their participation in the walkout. This required parental consent, and was administered the same day.
