= Damascus Gymnasium =

- U.S. National Register of Historic Places
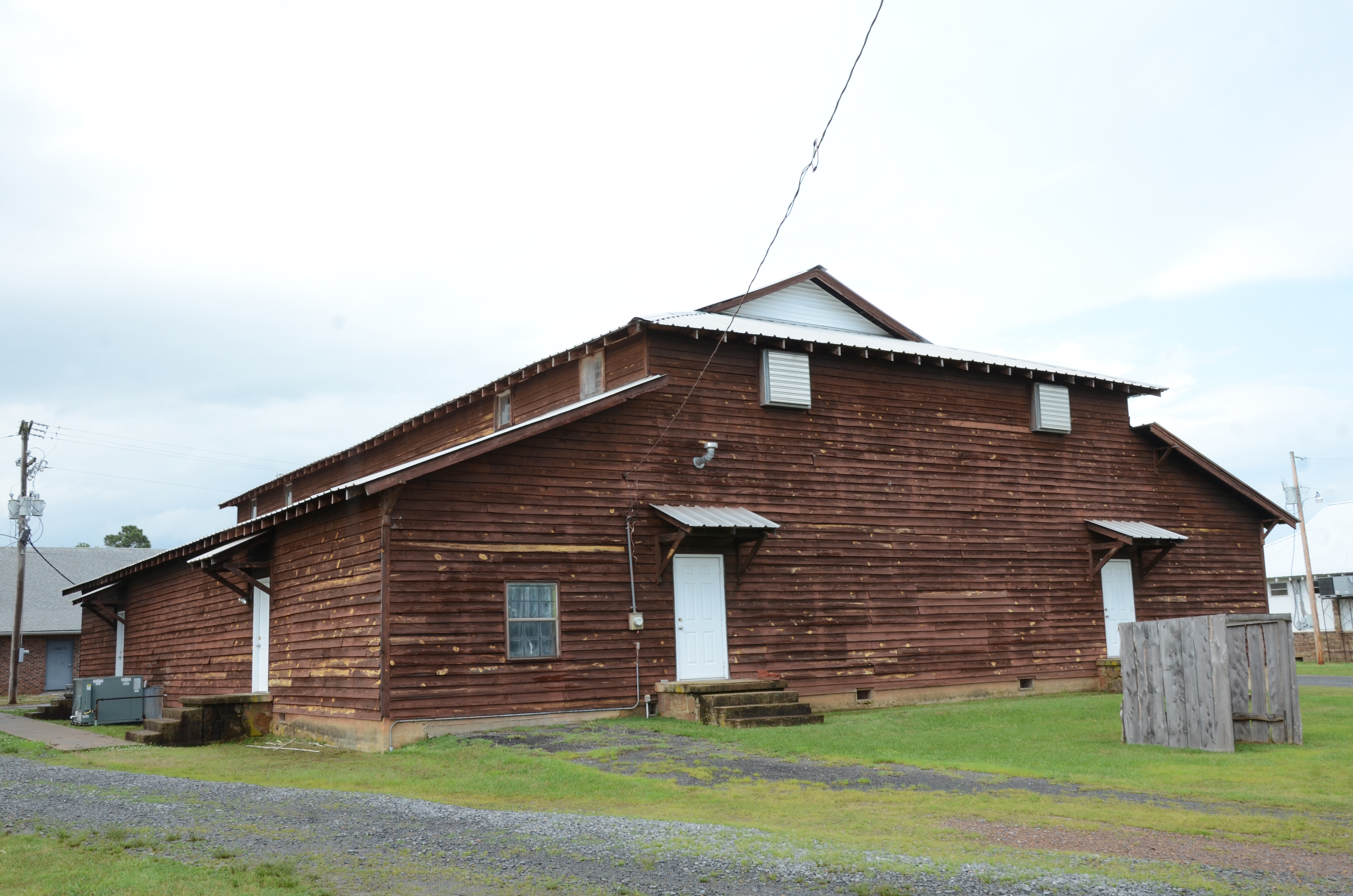

- Location within Arkansas Location within the United States
- Location: AR 285, Damascus, Arkansas
- Coordinates: 35°22′3″N 92°24′36″W
- Area: less than one acre
- Built by: Works Progress Administration
- Architectural style: Bungalow/craftsman
- MPS: Public Schools in the Ozarks MPS
- NRHP reference No.: 92001122
- Added to NRHP: September 4, 1992

The Damascus Gymnasium is a historic school building on Arkansas Highway 285 in Damascus, Arkansas. It is a rustic 1 1/2-story wood-frame structure, with a central clerestory section covered by a gable-on-hip roof, and side wings covered by a shed roof. The main entrance, on the east side, is sheltered by a gabled porch, with secondary entrances on the south side, each sheltered by a gable roof supported by large brackets. The gymnasium was built in 1933 with funding support from the Works Progress Administration.

The building was listed on the National Register of Historic Places in 1992.

== See also ==
- National Register of Historic Places listings in Van Buren County, Arkansas
