= EAST Initiative =

Educational organization

- Formation: 1995/1996 School Year
- Founder: Tim Stephenson
- Founded at: Greenbrier, Arkansas
- Type: Nonprofit
- Tax ID no.: 71-0863568
- Headquarters: Little Rock, Arkansas
- President & CEO: Matt Dozier
- Revenue: $3.7 million USD (2024)
- Expenses: $3.94 million USD (2024)
- Website: https://www.eastinitiative.org/

The EAST Initiative is an educational non-profit organization that oversees and trains educators and students in an educational model, EAST, that operates primarily in the United States.

The program began in 1995 in Arkansas. It offers students and teachers professional technology and software for use in a service-oriented, self-driven environment.

== History ==
The EAST Initiative was founded by Tim Stephenson, a former law enforcement officer turned teacher, at Greenbrier High School (Arkansas), in Greenbrier, Arkansas, in the 1995/1996 school year.

Authors, Sarah C. McKenzie and Gary W. Ritter, both from University of Arkansas, Fayetteville, describe the origin story In their Policy Brief, titled "EAST Initiative," part of the Office for Education Policy Series from ScholarWorks@UARK:

In an effort to connect with his at-risk students, Stephenson organized an outing to a wooded area with a creek and pond, where students sometimes went to skip classes. The first EAST project turned out to be building a bridge across that creek. One of the students’ parents volunteered to help teach students how to design the bridge by using technological tools. Stephenson’s students were excited about their accomplishment and proposed more projects. To help with these future projects, Stephenson arranged a partnership between his students and an Arkansas technology firm.

EAST is an acronym for Environmental and Spatial Technology.

In 2018 after a rebranding campaign, EAST used their acronym to provide a "tag line" to better explain the model, "Education Accelerated by Service and Technology," though the original acronym still serves as the official one serving even serving as the formal name of the 501(c)(3) organization, Environmental and Spatial Technology, Inc.

=== Non-profit Status ===
The EAST Initiative was determined by the Internal Revenue Service to be exempt from income tax under 501(c)(3) of the IRS Code and have a status as a Public Charity under IRS Code 170(b)(1)(A)(vi), beginning in 2002.

Donations made to EAST Initiative are tax deductible, per the U.S. Internal Revenue Service, Publication 78 Data.

== Program Adoption ==
EAST Initiative program adoption has fluctuated over the years, since its inception, but it appears that the early to mid-2000s represented the verified height of the U.S. nation-wide adoption, with 2004-2005 marking the peak where EAST projects were in place in more than 150 schools in Alabama, California, Hawaii, Illinois and Louisiana.

As of 2022-2023, EAST Initiative reports there to be "EAST Programs" in 308 educational institutions, across 4 U.S. States, including Arkansas, Oklahoma, Louisiana, and Pennsylvania.

== U.S. National and State Recognition and Codification ==
Throughout its existence the EAST Initiative, or its Program Model, have been recognized by U.S. Federal Agencies and State Governments for its efficacy in assisting students in building skills in arts, tools, and "emerging technologies", and improving independent and interdependent, self-driven, project-based skillsets in real-world and work-like settings.

=== United States Department of Education ===
In 2004, the United States Department of Education stated that "[t]he EAST [M]odel has been recognized nationally as an innovative, relevant, and successful approach to education," included the EAST Modal in its nationwide examples of programs which demonstrated that "results in educational achievement often have been significant."

The EAST Model was included in the United States Department of Education's 2004 "National Education Technology Plan".

=== State of Arkansas ===
==== Arkansas Department of Education ====
The EAST Initiative is recognized by the Arkansas Department of Education and the department continues to provide support and grant funding for the implementation of EAST Programs in Arkansas; most recently, the Division of Elementary and Secondary Education of the Arkansas Department of Education provided startup grant funding for 13 additional schools to add EAST Programs in 2026–2027.

=== State of Hawaii ===
==== Legislature of Hawaii ====
The Legislature of the State of Hawaii have introduced multiple Bills, including SB1921 (2007) and HB1630 (2008), in attempts to codify budget allotments and state-wide adoption of EAST Initiative Programs.

== Current participating Educational Institutions ==
=== High Schools ===
- Lakeside High School, in Hot Springs, AR. and Lake Village, AR.

=== Junior High Schools ===
- Ahlf Junior High School, in Searcy, AR. (beginning in 2016 to current school year, 2025)
- Lakeside Junior High School, in Hot Springs, AR and Springdale, AR (current school year, 2025)

=== Middle Schools ===
- Lakeside Middle School, in Hot Springs, AR. and Lake Village, AR. (current school year, 2025)

== Past participating Educational Institutions ==
=== High Schools ===
- Arcata High School, in Arcata, CA. (participated at least through school year 2003)
  - Moved to the Career and Technical Education (CTE) Model (as of review in 2025)
- Eureka High School, in Eureka, CA. (participated at least through school year 2003)
  - Moved to the Career and Technical Education (CTE) Model (as of review in 2025)
- Fortuna High School, in Fortuna, CA. (participated at least through school year 2003)
  - Moved to the Career and Technical Education (CTE) Model (as of review in 2025)
- Lahainaluna High School, in Lahaina, HI (participated from 2000 to school year 2005)
  - Moved to the Career and Technical Education (CTE) Model (as of review in 2025)
- King Kekaulike High School, in Pukalani, HI (participated for at least the 2004 and 2005 school years)
  - Moved to the Career and Technical Education (CTE) Model (as of review in 2025)
