= Wooster, Arkansas =

- City
- Location of Wooster in Faulkner County, Arkansas.
- Coordinates: 35°12′2″N 92°27′13″W
- Country: United States
- State: Arkansas
- County: Faulkner

Government
  - Mayor: Terry D. Robinson

Area
  - City: 2.85 sq mi (7.37 km^{2})
  - Land: 2.85 sq mi (7.37 km^{2})
  - Water: 0 sq mi (0.00 km^{2})
- Elevation: 292 ft (89 m)

Population (2020)
  - City: 1,042
  - Estimate (2025): 1,150 ▲
  - Density: 366/sq mi (141.4/km^{2})
  - Metro: 748,031
- Time zone: UTC-6 (Central (CST))
  - Summer (DST): UTC-5 (CDT)
- ZIP code: 72181
- Area code: 501
- FIPS code: 05-76820
- GNIS feature ID: 2406918
- Website: woosterar.com

Wooster is a city in Faulkner County, Arkansas, United States. The population was 1,042 at the 2020 census, up from 860 at the 2010 census. It is part of the Central Arkansas region.

== Geography ==
Wooster is located in northwestern Faulkner County. Arkansas Highway 25 passes through the city, leading northeast 5 miles (8 km) to Greenbrier and south 9 miles (14 km) to Conway, the county seat.

According to the United States Census Bureau, the town has a total area of 2.9 square miles (7.4 km^{2}), all land.

== Demographics ==
Historical population
Census	Pop.	Note	%±
1960	161		—
1970	307		90.7%
1980	398		29.6%
1990	414		4.0%
2000	516		24.6%
2010	860		66.7%
2020	1,042		21.2%
2025 (est.)	1,150	▲	10.4%
U.S. Decennial Census

=== 2020 census ===
Wooster racial composition
Race	Number	Percentage
White (non-Hispanic)	945	90.69%
Black or African American (non-Hispanic)	11	1.06%
Asian	6	0.58%
Other/Mixed	69	6.62%
Hispanic or Latino	11	1.06%

As of the 2020 United States census, there were 1,042 people, 352 households, and 310 families residing in the town.

=== 2000 census ===
As of the census of 2000, there were 516 people, 200 households, and 154 families residing in the town. The population density was 77.5/km^{2} (200.8/mi^{2}). There were 214 housing units at an average density of 32.2/km^{2} (83.3/mi^{2}). The racial makeup of the town was 97.29% White, 0.19% Black or African American, 0.78% Native American, 0.58% Asian, 0.58% from other races, and 0.58% from two or more races. 0.97% of the population were Hispanic or Latino of any race.

There were 200 households, out of which 33.5% had children under the age of 18 living with them, 64.0% were married couples living together, 10.0% had a female householder with no husband present, and 23.0% were non-families. 21.5% of all households were made up of individuals, and 11.0% had someone living alone who was 65 years of age or older. The average household size was 2.58 and the average family size was 3.01.

In the town the population was spread out, with 23.4% under the age of 18, 7.8% from 18 to 24, 28.9% from 25 to 44, 26.9% from 45 to 64, and 13.0% who were 65 years of age or older. The median age was 39 years. For every 100 females, there were 99.2 males. For every 100 females age 18 and over, there were 98.5 males.

The median income for a household in the town was $35,063, and the median income for a family was $39,375. Males had a median income of $30,438 versus $24,063 for females. The per capita income for the town was $15,421. About 4.5% of families and 9.0% of the population were below the poverty line, including 15.4% of those under age 18 and 9.7% of those age 65 or over.

== Education ==
Public education for elementary and secondary school students is primarily provided by the Greenbrier School District, beginning at the district's Wooster Elementary School and leading to graduation from Greenbrier High School.
