= Guy, Arkansas =

City in Faulkner County, Arkansas, US

- City
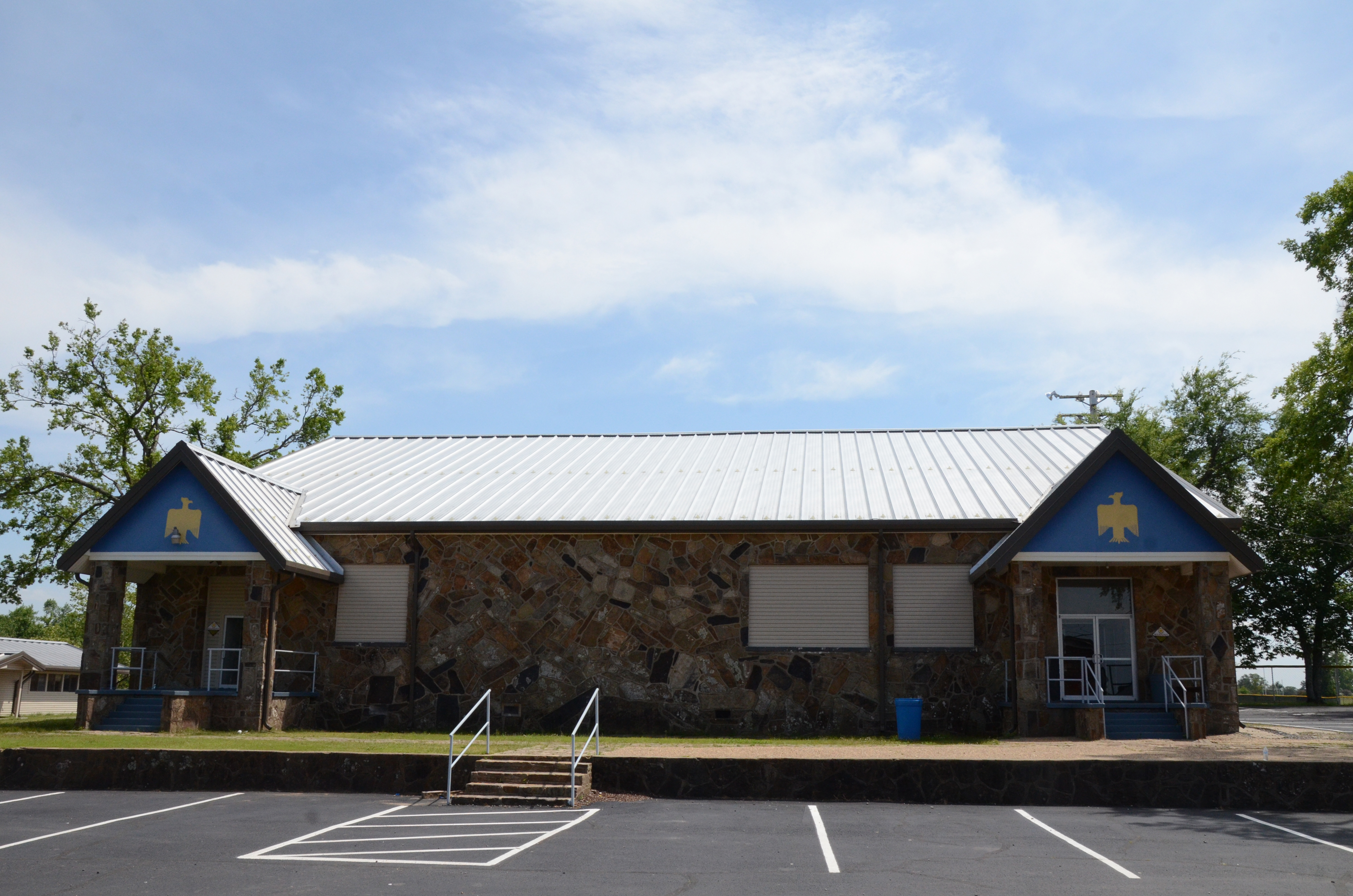
- Guy High School Gymnasium, May 2015

- Location of Guy in Faulkner County, Arkansas.
- Coordinates: 35°19′29″N 92°20′6″W
- Country: United States
- State: Arkansas
- County: Faulkner
- Township: California

Area
  - City: 6.78 sq mi (17.55 km^{2})
  - Land: 6.78 sq mi (17.55 km^{2})
  - Water: 0 sq mi (0.00 km^{2})
- Elevation: 663 ft (202 m)

Population (2020)
  - City: 752
  - Estimate (2025): 798 ▲
  - Density: 111.0/sq mi (42.85/km^{2})
  - Metro: 748,031
- Time zone: UTC-6 (Central (CST))
  - Summer (DST): UTC-5 (CDT)
- ZIP code: 72061
- Area code: 501
- FIPS code: 05-29230
- GNIS feature ID: 2406633

Guy is a city in Faulkner County, Arkansas, United States. As of the 2020 census, Guy had a population of 752. It is part of the Central Arkansas region.

== Geography ==
Guy is located in northern Faulkner County. Arkansas Highway 25 passes through the town, leading northeast 9 miles (14 km) to Quitman and southwest 7 miles (11 km) to Greenbrier. Conway, the county seat, is 19 miles (31 km) to the southwest via AR 25 and US 65.

According to the United States Census Bureau, the town of Guy has a total area of 5.5 square miles (14.3 km^{2}), all land.

== Demographics ==
Historical population
Census	Pop.	Note	%±
1970	179		—
1980	209		16.8%
1990	241		15.3%
2000	202		−16.2%
2010	708		250.5%
2020	752		6.2%
2025 (est.)	798	▲	6.1%
U.S. Decennial Census

As of the census of 2000, there were 202 people, 84 households, and 65 families residing in the town. The population density was 219.4 inhabitants per square mile (84.7/km^{2}). There were 92 housing units at an average density of 99.9 per square mile (38.6/km^{2}). The racial makeup of the town was 96.04% White, 0.50% Black or African American, and 3.47% from two or more races.

There were 84 households, out of which 31.0% had children under the age of 18 living with them, 65.5% were married couples living together, 9.5% had a female householder with no husband present, and 22.6% were non-families. 21.4% of all households were made up of individuals, and 8.3% had someone living alone who was 65 years of age or older. The average household size was 2.40 and the average family size was 2.74.

In the town the population was spread out, with 20.8% under the age of 18, 7.4% from 18 to 24, 30.7% from 25 to 44, 26.7% from 45 to 64, and 14.4% who were 65 years of age or older. The median age was 40 years. For every 100 females, there were 83.6 males. For every 100 females age 18 and over, there were 92.8 males.

The median income for a household in the town was $35,625, and the median income for a family was $38,977. Males had a median income of $26,875 versus $23,750 for females. The per capita income for the town was $15,732. About 10.2% of families and 14.0% of the population were below the poverty line, including 16.2% of those under the age of eighteen and 7.1% of those 65 or over.

== Education ==
Public education for elementary and secondary school students in the majority of the city limits is given by the Guy–Perkins School District, which leads to graduation from Guy–Perkins High School. The Guy-Perkins school was circa 2015 placed on the Arkansas State Board of Educations fiscal distress list, with the school having said to be in excess of $2 million in debt.

A small section of the city extends into the South Side School District.

== Unusual geologic activity ==
Starting on September 20, 2010 (of which the event on February 27, 2011, was the largest, at magnitude 4.7), the area around Guy was plagued by more than 500 earthquakes. The temblors, ranging from 1.8 (barely noticeable) to 4.7 (very obvious), are being investigated by the US Geological Survey and the Arkansas Oil and Gas Commission. The quakes may be related to the injection of salt and other waste water into deep wells to dispose of the fluid without contaminating surface or ground water.

== See also ==
- List of cities in Arkansas
