= Guy–Perkins High School =

Location
- 492 AR 25 North; Guy, Arkansas 72061; United States; 35°19′32″N 92°19′23″W

Information
- School type: Comprehensive
- School district: Guy–Perkins School District
- NCES District ID: 0507140
- CEEB code: 040980
- NCES School ID: 050714000434
- Principal: Karen Hoskins
- Teaching staff: 27.77 (on FTE basis)
- Grades: 7–12
- Enrollment: 150 (2023–2024)
- Student to teacher ratio: 5.40
- Colors: Blue and gold
- Athletics conference: 1A 5 North (2012–14)
- Mascot: Thunderbird
- Team name: Guy–Perkins Thunderbirds
- Website: www.gptbirds.org

Guy–Perkins High School is a comprehensive six-year public high school in Guy, Arkansas, United States. It is one of four public high schools in Faulkner County and is the sole high school administered by Guy–Perkins School District serving grades 7 through 12. The school's varsity athletic teams have won 12 state championship titles, primarily in basketball.

== Athletics ==
The Guy–Perkins mascot and athletic emblem is the Thunderbird with blue and gold serving as its school colors.

The Guy–Perkins Thunderbirds compete in the state's smallest classification—Class A, administered by the Arkansas Activities Association. For 2012–14, the Thunderbirds compete in the 1A Region 5 North Conference. Guy–Perkins sponsor teams in volleyball, golf (boys/girls), basketball (boys/girls), baseball, softball, and track and field (boys/girls).

The boys' basketball team has won 6 Class A state championships in 1997, 2005, 2006, 2009, 2017, and 2018.

The girls' basketball team has won 5 Class A state championships in 1984, 2001, 2002, 2003, and 2005, and 1 overall state championship in 1984.
