= Benton Township, Faulkner County, Arkansas =

Benton Township
- Township
- Location in Arkansas Benton Township (the United States)
- Coordinates: 35°19′14″N 92°13′42″W
- Country: United States
- State: Arkansas
- County: Faulkner

Area
  - Total: 29.247 sq mi (75.75 km^{2})
  - Land: 29.247 sq mi (75.75 km^{2})
  - Water: 0.000 sq mi (0 km^{2})
- Elevation: 535 ft (163 m)

Population (2010)
  - Total: 961
  - Density: 32.9/sq mi (12.7/km^{2})
- Time zone: UTC-6 (CST)
  - Summer (DST): UTC-5 (CDT)
- FIPS code: 05-90240
- GNIS ID: 66521

Benton Township is a township in Faulkner County, Arkansas, United States. Its total population was 961 as of the 2010 United States census, an increase of 24.16 percent from 774 at the 2000 census.

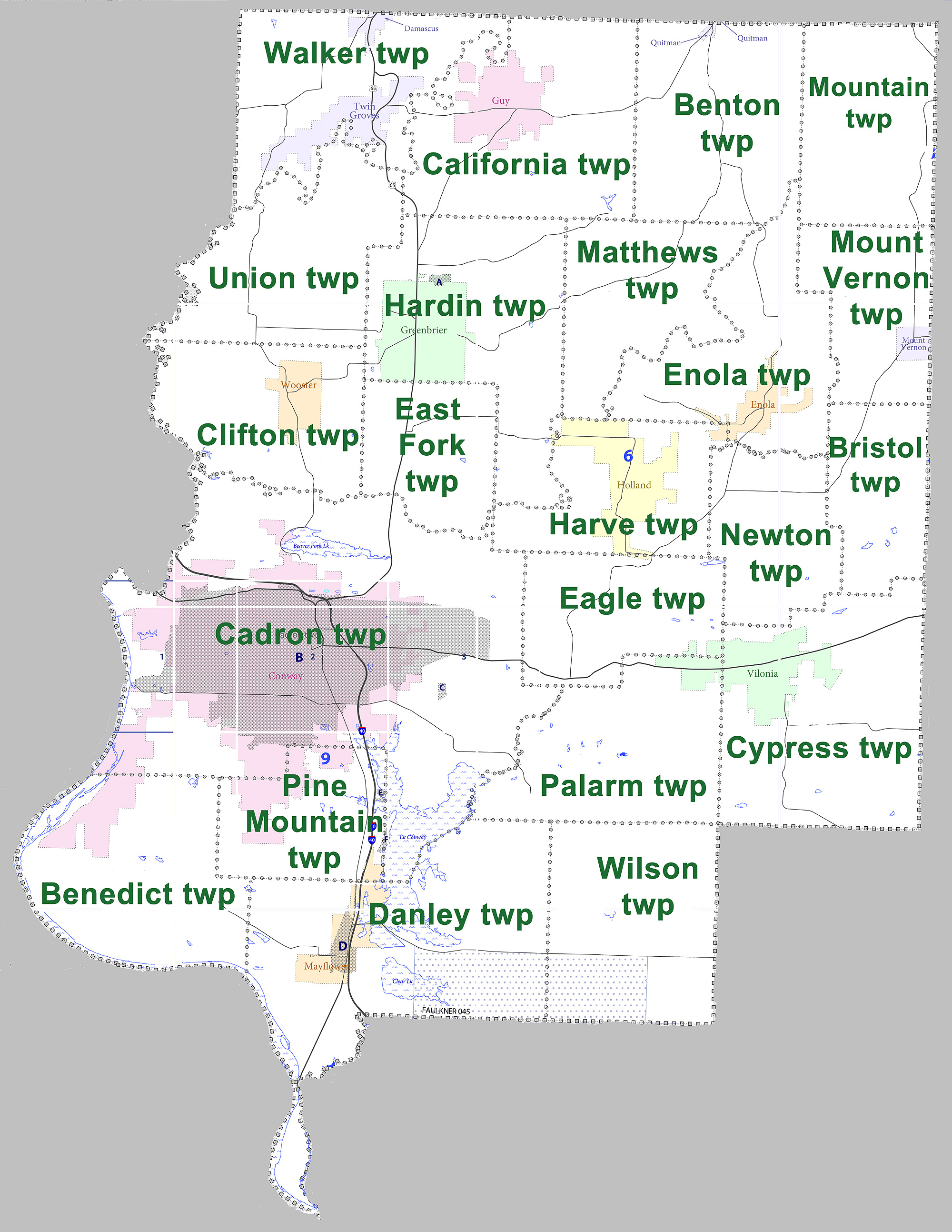
Townships in Faulkner County as of 2010

According to the 2010 Census, Benton Township is located at 35°19′14″N 92°13′42″W (35.320424, -92.228274). It has a total area of 29.247 square miles (75.75 square kilometers), all of which is land. As per the USGS National Elevation Dataset, the elevation is 535 feet (163 m).

Part of the city of Quitman is located within the township.
