= Faulkner County, Arkansas =

County in Arkansas, United States

- County
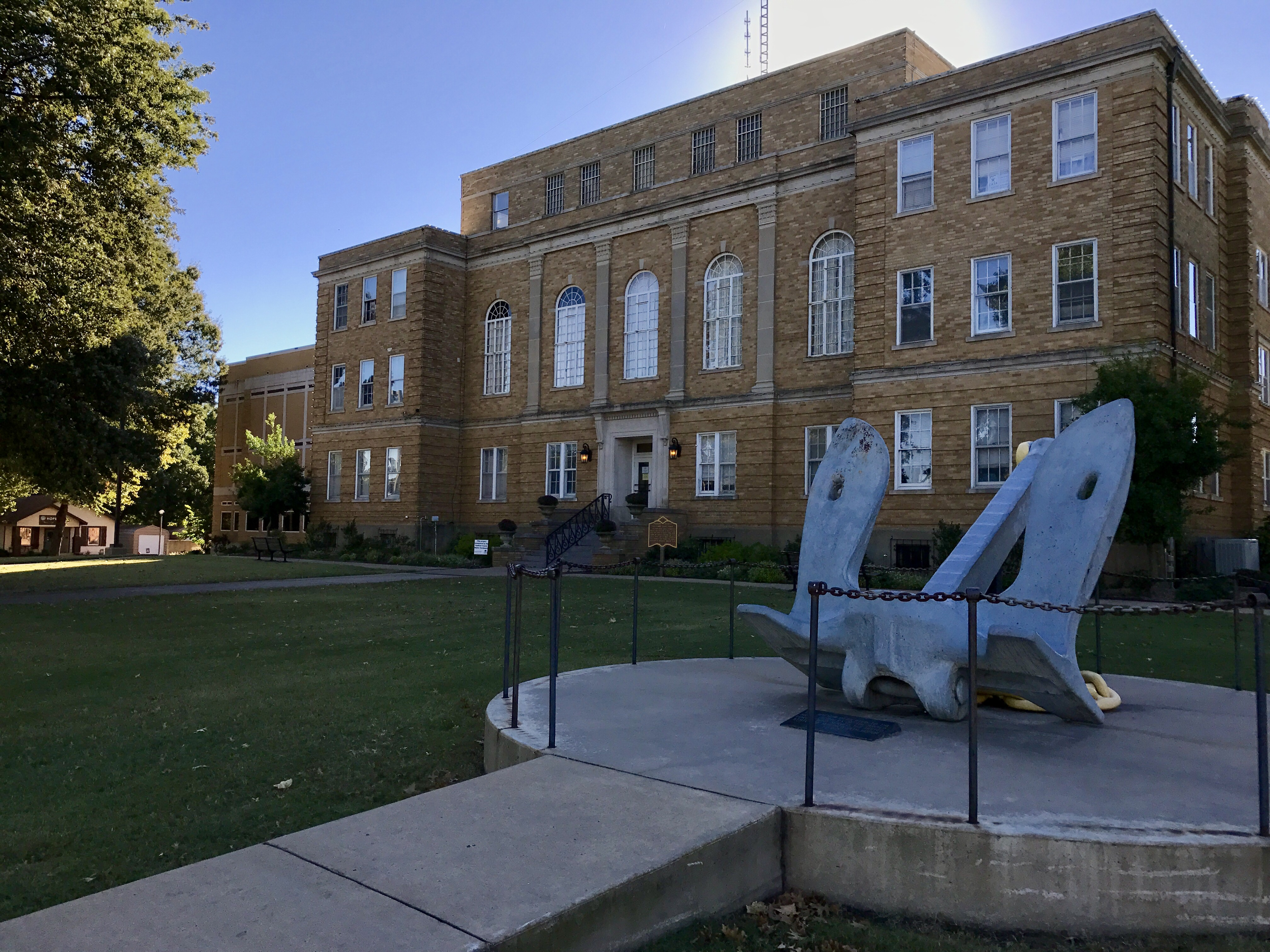
- Faulkner County Courthouse

- Flag Seal

- Location within the U.S. state of Arkansas
- Coordinates: 35°09′36″N 92°18′49″W
- Country: United States
- State: Arkansas
- Founded: April 12, 1873
- Named for: Sandford C. Faulkner
- Seat: Conway
- Largest city: Conway

Area
  - Total: 664 sq mi (1,720 km^{2})
  - Land: 648 sq mi (1,680 km^{2})
  - Water: 16 sq mi (41 km^{2}) 2.4%

Population (2020)
  - Total: 123,498
  - Estimate (2025): 133,979 ▲
  - Density: 191/sq mi (73.6/km^{2})
- Time zone: UTC−6 (Central)
  - Summer (DST): UTC−5 (CDT)
- Congressional district: 2nd
- Website: www.faulknercountyar.gov

Faulkner County is a county located in the Central Arkansas region of the U.S. state of Arkansas. As of the 2020 census, the population was 123,498, making it the fifth most populous of Arkansas's 75 counties. The county seat and largest city is Conway. Faulkner County was created on April 12, 1873, one of nine counties formed during Reconstruction, and is named for Sandford C. Faulkner, better known as Sandy Faulkner, a popular figure in the state at the time.

Located at the intersection of the Ozarks and Arkansas River Valley, the county was sparsely populated for much of its early years. Largely a county of rural settlements, growth came slowly following the Civil War and Reconstruction. The college known today as University of Central Arkansas was established in 1907, but population continued to grow slowly. The growth of Little Rock and the construction of Interstate 40 have made Conway and other parts of Faulkner County into bedroom communities for the state capital. Today Faulkner County is included in the Central Arkansas metro area, with Conway as a principal city.

== History ==
=== Eponym ===
Faulkner County was formed from parts of Conway and Pulaski counties on April 12, 1873, and is named after Sandford C. Faulkner, a planter, raconteur, and fiddle player known for his popular folk tale Arkansas Traveler (folklore) from the early-19th century. The story later was performed by Mose Case in the mid-19th century as a folk song "Arkansas Traveler", the official historic song of the U.S. state of Arkansas since 1987.

== Geography ==
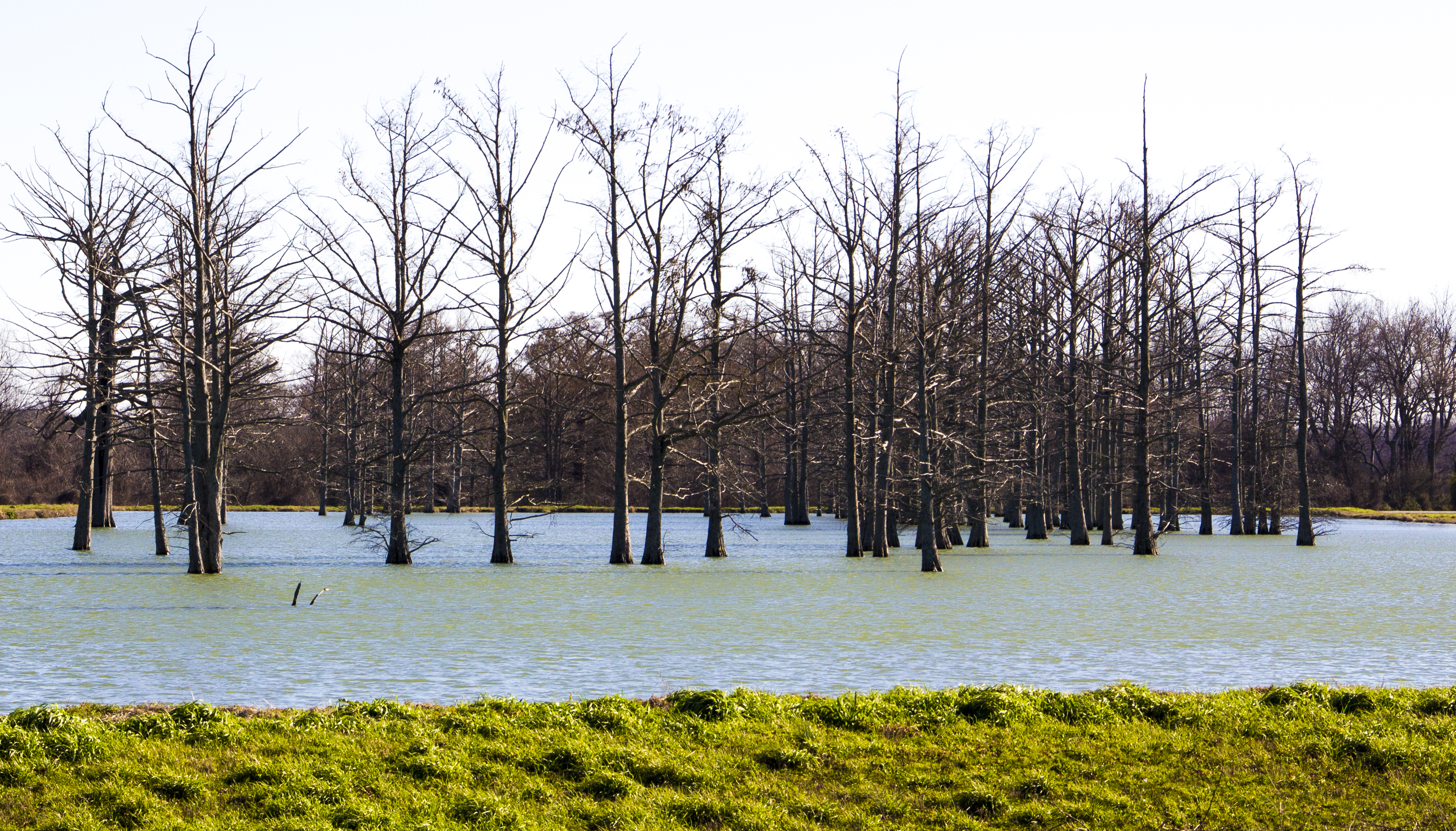
Lake Conway

According to the U.S. Census Bureau, the county has a total area of 664 square miles (1,720 km^{2}), of which 648 square miles (1,680 km^{2}) is land and 16 square miles (41 km^{2}) (2.4%) is water.

=== Major highways ===
- Interstate 40
- U.S. Highway 64
  - US 64B
- U.S. Highway 65
  - US 65B
- Highway 25
- Highway 36
- Highway 37
- Highway 60
- Highway 89
- Highway 107
- Highway 124
- Highway 225
- Highway 266
- Highway 285
- Highway 286
- Highway 287
- Highway 310
- Highway 319
- Highway 365

=== Transit ===
- Jefferson Lines

=== Adjacent counties ===
- Cleburne County (northeast)
- White County (east)
- Lonoke County (southeast)
- Pulaski County (south)
- Perry County (southwest)
- Conway County (west)
- Van Buren County (northwest)

== Demographics ==
Historical population
Census	Pop.	Note	%±
1880	12,786		—
1890	18,342		43.5%
1900	20,780		13.3%
1910	23,708		14.1%
1920	27,681		16.8%
1930	28,381		2.5%
1940	25,880		−8.8%
1950	25,289		−2.3%
1960	24,303		−3.9%
1970	31,572		29.9%
1980	46,192		46.3%
1990	60,006		29.9%
2000	86,014		43.3%
2010	113,237		31.6%
2020	123,498		9.1%
2025 (est.)	133,979	▲	8.5%
U.S. Decennial Census; 1790–1960 1900–1990; 1990–2000 2010

=== 2020 census ===
As of the 2020 census, the county had a population of 123,498. The median age was 34.5 years. 23.3% of residents were under the age of 18 and 13.8% of residents were 65 years of age or older. For every 100 females there were 94.9 males, and for every 100 females age 18 and over there were 91.6 males age 18 and over.

The racial makeup of the county was 76.2% White, 11.6% Black or African American, 0.6% American Indian and Alaska Native, 1.2% Asian, 0.1% Native Hawaiian and Pacific Islander, 2.7% from some other race, and 7.6% from two or more races. Hispanic or Latino residents of any race comprised 5.5% of the population.

53.9% of residents lived in urban areas, while 46.1% lived in rural areas.

There were 47,622 households in the county, of which 32.4% had children under the age of 18 living in them. Of all households, 48.4% were married-couple households, 18.4% were households with a male householder and no spouse or partner present, and 26.9% were households with a female householder and no spouse or partner present. About 26.6% of all households were made up of individuals and 8.9% had someone living alone who was 65 years of age or older.

There were 51,685 housing units, of which 7.9% were vacant. Among occupied housing units, 62.7% were owner-occupied and 37.3% were renter-occupied. The homeowner vacancy rate was 1.7% and the rental vacancy rate was 8.1%.

=== 2000 census ===
As of the 2000 United States census, there were 86,014 people, 31,882 households, and 22,444 families residing in the county. The population density was 133 inhabitants per square mile (51/km^{2}). There were 34,546 housing units at an average density of 53 per square mile (20/km^{2}). The racial makeup of the county was 88.33% White, 8.48% Black or African American, 0.52% Native American, 0.72% Asian, 0.03% Pacific Islander, 0.68% from other races, and 1.23% from two or more races. 1.75% of the population were Hispanic or Latino of any race.

There were 31,882 households, out of which 35.70% had children under the age of 18 living with them, 56.70% were married couples living together, 10.20% had a female householder with no husband present, and 29.60% were non-families. 22.50% of all households were made up of individuals, and 6.90% had someone living alone who was 65 years of age or older. The average household size was 2.57 and the average family size was 3.04.

In the county, the population was spread out, with 25.60% under the age of 18, 15.30% from 18 to 24, 30.10% from 25 to 44, 19.50% from 45 to 64, and 9.50% who were 65 years of age or older. The median age was 31 years. For every 100 females, there were 95.50 males. For every 100 females age 18 and over, there were 92.30 males.

The median income for a household in the county was $38,204, and the median income for a family was $45,946. Males had a median income of $32,288 versus $24,428 for females. The per capita income for the county was $35,159. About 7.90% of families and 12.50% of the population were below the poverty line, including 12.90% of those under age 18 and 12.00% of those age 65 or over.

== Government and politics ==
=== Government ===
The county government is a constitutional body granted specific powers by the Constitution of Arkansas and the Arkansas Code. The quorum court is the legislative branch of the county government and controls all spending and revenue collection. Representatives are called justices of the peace and are elected from county districts every even-numbered year. The number of districts in a county vary from nine to fifteen, and district boundaries are drawn by the county election commission. The Faulkner County Quorum Court has thirteen members. Presiding over quorum court meetings is the county judge, who serves as the chief executive officer of the county. The county judge is elected at-large and does not vote in quorum court business, although capable of vetoing quorum court decisions.

Faulkner County, Arkansas countywide elected officials
Position	Officeholder	Party
County Judge	Allen Dodson	Republican
County Clerk	Margaret Darter	Republican
Circuit Clerk	Nancy Eastham	Republican
Sheriff	Tim Ryals	Republican
Treasurer	Scott Sanson	Republican
Tax Collector	Sherry Koonce	Republican
Tax Assessor	Krissy Lewis	Republican
Coroner	Jessica Thorn	(Unknown)

The composition of the Quorum Court following the 2024 elections is 11 Republicans and 2 Democrats. Justices of the Peace (members) of the Quorum Court following the elections are:

- District 1: Justin Knight (R)
- District 2: Maree Coats (R)
- District 3: John Allison III (R)
- District 4: Samuel Strain (R)
- District 5: Jonny Tyler (R)
- District 6: Tyler Lachowsky (R)
- District 7: Tyler Pearson (D)
- District 8: Jason Lyon (R)
- District 9: Kris Kendrick (R)
- District 10: Andy Shock (R)
- District 11: Joyia Yorgey (D)
- District 12: David Meeks (R)
- District 13: Jake Moss (R)

Additionally, the townships of Faulkner County are entitled to elect their own respective constables, as set forth by the Constitution of Arkansas. Constables are largely of historical significance as they were used to keep the peace in rural areas when travel was more difficult.

The township constables as of the 2024 elections are:

- Cadron: Earl David Hall (R)
- Cypress: Gary Adams (R)
- Danley: Mark Kolody (R)
- Hardin: Howard Hall (R)
- Matthews: James D. Freeman (R)
- Wilson: Terry L. Jones (R)

=== Politics ===
Over the past few election cycles Faulkner county has trended heavily towards the GOP. The last Democrat (as of 2024) to carry this county was Arkansas native Bill Clinton in 1996.

United States presidential election results for Faulkner County, Arkansas
Year	Republican		Democratic		Third party(ies)	
Year	No.	%	No.	%	No.	%
1892	1,200	39.74%	1,499	49.64%	321	10.63%
1896	556	21.27%	2,044	78.19%	14	0.54%
1900	682	35.69%	1,191	62.32%	38	1.99%
1904	764	40.06%	1,073	56.27%	70	3.67%
1908	740	28.00%	1,771	67.01%	132	4.99%
1912	402	20.20%	1,316	66.13%	272	13.67%
1916	817	28.69%	2,031	71.31%	0	0.00%
1920	1,148	35.31%	1,971	60.63%	132	4.06%
1924	536	25.14%	1,436	67.35%	160	7.50%
1928	992	27.07%	2,659	72.57%	13	0.35%
1932	437	13.48%	2,749	84.77%	57	1.76%
1936	511	16.79%	2,521	82.82%	12	0.39%
1940	519	16.93%	2,535	82.68%	12	0.39%
1944	897	27.69%	2,332	72.00%	10	0.31%
1948	626	17.40%	2,653	73.76%	318	8.84%
1952	1,995	36.47%	3,461	63.27%	14	0.26%
1956	2,399	40.94%	3,428	58.50%	33	0.56%
1960	2,426	36.71%	3,820	57.80%	363	5.49%
1964	3,259	34.61%	6,116	64.95%	42	0.45%
1968	2,791	25.55%	3,756	34.39%	4,375	40.06%
1972	6,746	59.44%	4,604	40.56%	0	0.00%
1976	3,904	25.44%	11,423	74.45%	16	0.10%
1980	7,544	44.19%	8,528	49.95%	1,001	5.86%
1984	11,595	60.89%	7,169	37.65%	279	1.47%
1988	10,678	58.42%	7,302	39.95%	299	1.64%
1992	9,491	37.64%	13,000	51.56%	2,724	10.80%
1996	10,178	42.19%	12,032	49.88%	1,913	7.93%
2000	16,055	54.95%	11,950	40.90%	1,211	4.14%
2004	21,514	58.64%	14,538	39.63%	634	1.73%
2008	25,362	61.59%	14,955	36.32%	862	2.09%
2012	26,722	64.45%	13,621	32.85%	1,117	2.69%
2016	29,346	61.75%	14,629	30.78%	3,552	7.47%
2020	34,421	63.24%	18,347	33.71%	1,660	3.05%
2024	35,357	64.92%	17,752	32.59%	1,356	2.49%

== Education ==
=== Public education ===
Publicly funded education for elementary and secondary school students is provided by:

- Conway School District, which includes Conway High School, Conway
- Greenbrier School District, which includes Greenbrier High School, Greenbrier
- Guy–Perkins School District, which includes Guy–Perkins High School, Guy
- Mayflower School District, which includes Mayflower High School, Mayflower
- Mount Vernon–Enola School District, which includes Mount Vernon–Enola High School, Mount Vernon
- Pulaski County Special School District
- Quitman School District
- Rose Bud School District
- South Side School District
- Vilonia School District, which includes Vilonia High School, Vilonia

=== Private education ===
Privately funded education for elementary and secondary school students is provided by:

- St. Joseph High School, Conway
- Conway Christian School (Conway, Arkansas)

== Communities ==
=== Cities ===
- Conway (county seat)
- Greenbrier
- Guy
- Holland
- Mayflower
- Quitman (mostly in Cleburne County)
- Vilonia

=== Towns ===
- Damascus (partly in Van Buren County)
- Enders
- Enola
- Mount Vernon
- Twin Groves
- Wooster

== Townships ==
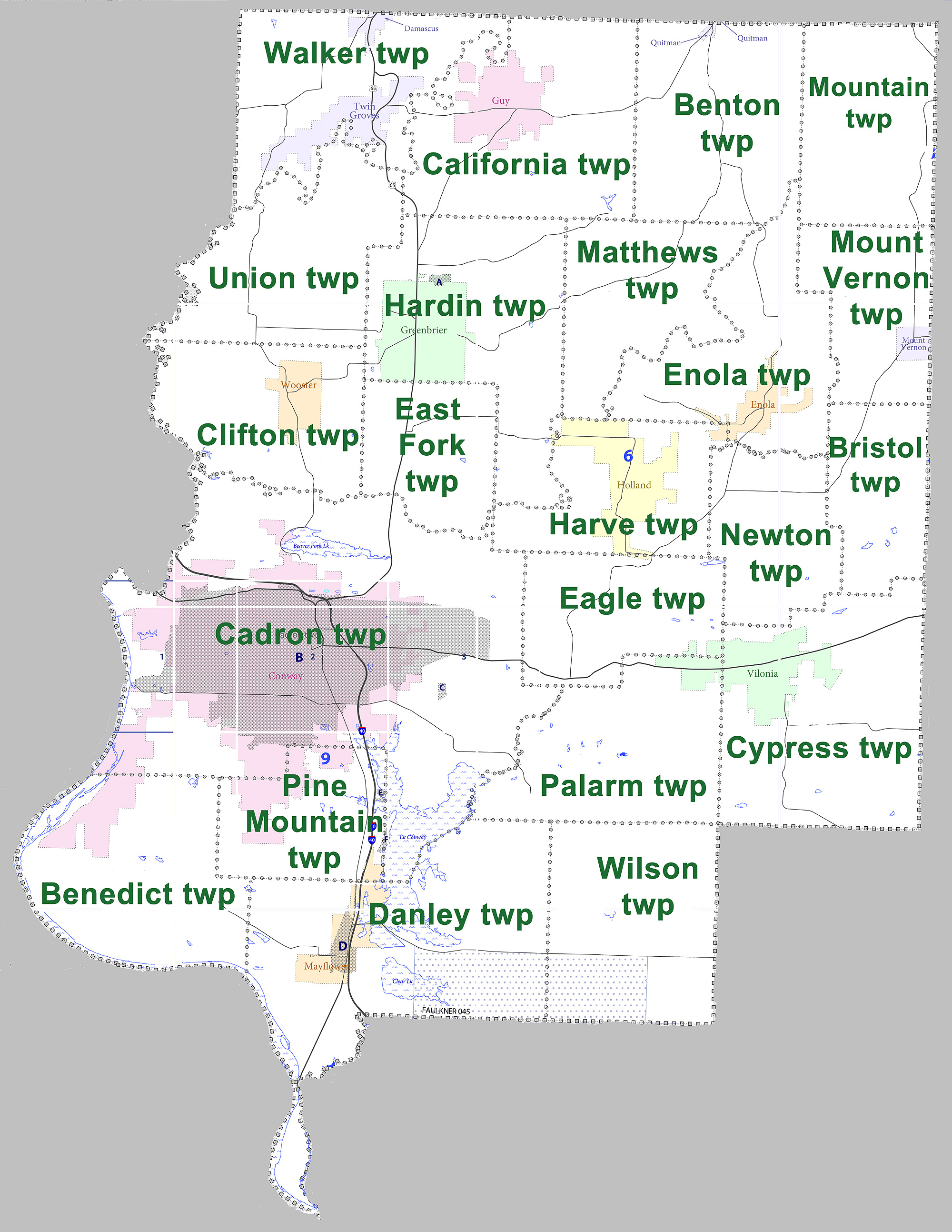
Townships in Faulkner County, Arkansas as of 2010

Townships in Arkansas are the divisions of a county. Each township includes unincorporated areas; some may have incorporated cities or towns within part of their boundaries. Arkansas townships have limited purposes in modern times. However, the United States census does list Arkansas population based on townships (sometimes referred to as "county subdivisions" or "minor civil divisions"). Townships are also of value for historical purposes in terms of genealogical research. Each town or city is within one or more townships in an Arkansas county based on census maps and publications. The townships of Faulkner County are listed below; listed in parentheses are the cities, towns, and/or census-designated places that are fully or partially inside the township.

- Benedict (contains part of Conway)
- Benton (contains part of Quitman)
- Bristol
- Cadron (contains most of Conway and part of Mayflower)
- California (contains most of Guy, part of Twin Groves)
- Clifton (contains Wooster)
- Cypress (contains most of Vilonia)
- Danley (contains most of Mayflower)
- Eagle (contains part of Holland and Vilonia)
- East Fork
- Enola (contains most of Enola)
- Hardin (contains Greenbrier and part of Holland)
- Harve (contains most of Holland, part of Enola)
- Matthews
- Mountain
- Mount Vernon (contains Mount Vernon)
- Newton
- Palarm (contains part of Vilonia)
- Pine Mountain (contains part of Conway and Mayflower)
- Union (contains part of Twin Groves)
- Walker (contains most of Twin Groves, part of Damascus and Guy)
- Wilson, includes Cato, Arkansas

== See also ==
- Faulconer County
- List of lakes in Faulkner County, Arkansas
- National Register of Historic Places listings in Faulkner County, Arkansas
- David J. Sanders, state senator who represents part of Faulkner County
- David Meeks and Stephen Meeks, Republican brothers from Faulkner County who represent Districts 70 and 67, respectively in the Arkansas House of Representatives
