= Greenbrier, Arkansas =

- City
- Location of Greenbrier in Faulkner County, Arkansas.
- Coordinates: 35°13′46″N 92°23′21″W
- Country: United States
- State: Arkansas
- County: Faulkner

Area
  - City: 7.93 sq mi (20.55 km^{2})
  - Land: 7.93 sq mi (20.55 km^{2})
  - Water: 0 sq mi (0.00 km^{2})
- Elevation: 358 ft (109 m)

Population (2020)
  - City: 5,707
  - Estimate (2025): 6,645 ▲
  - Density: 719.2/sq mi (277.67/km^{2})
  - Metro: 748,031
- Time zone: UTC-6 (Central (CST))
  - Summer (DST): UTC-5 (CDT)
- ZIP code: 72058
- Area code: 501
- FIPS code: 05-28510
- GNIS feature ID: 2403740
- Website: www.greenbrierar.gov

Greenbrier is a city in Faulkner County, Arkansas, United States. It is part of the Central Arkansas region. The population was 5,707 at the 2020 census, up from 4,706 at the 2010 census.

== History ==
Prior to European settlement, Native American tribes, including the Quapaw and later the Cherokee, lived in the area. Several historical figures of the Wild West such as Jim Bowie and Jesse James passed through the Greenbrier region toward Oklahoma and Texas. The Wiley brothers settled near East Fork Cadron around 1818, about 8 miles (13 km) east of today's Greenbrier. In 1837, Jonathan Hardin settled near the Wiley settlement. Also in the early 19th century, the Casharagos settled north of Greenbrier in the present community of Republican.

Greenbrier is a town that developed from a minor brothel on the Butterfield Stagecoach route into a bustling city. The town was named for the greenbriar vines which grew along the creek through the town. Greenbrier is located 12 miles (19 km) north of Conway on Highway 65. Recent years have seen continued growth as Greenbrier becomes a bedroom community for Conway. As early as 1818 settlers were in the vicinity of what is now Greenbrier. Mooresville was given as the name for this fast growing community. It was later changed to Greenbrier when the first post office was established on September 15, 1857. Henderson Moore was the first postmaster.

Greenbrier was incorporated as a town on April 5, 1880, with an estimated population of 300 people. Hardin Township at this time had 886 people and Cadron Township had 2,916 people. In 1905 Greenbrier could boast of eight general stores, three grist mills, four cotton gins, a steam sawmill and a shingle mill, three churches, a six-room school building, and 350 people.

There was a period of uncertainty from 1920 to 1940. Floods, droughts, and the Great Depression of 1930-1935 plagued Greenbrier and the social and cultural atmosphere displayed the feelings of uncertainty and dismay. As adjustments were made to the natural physical setbacks, there emerged a conservative type of culture. Some businesses closed permanently, others changed hands several times. Only a few stayed in business the entire period from 1920 to 1940. After 1935 the New Deal ushered in activities that provided employment which gave a new spurt of life.

The next two decades saw a reprieve from the earlier stagnation and people were again motivated to make Greenbrier into a thriving village. The relocation of U.S. Highway 65 through Greenbrier in 1942 gave a real boost to the town. Following the drought of 1950, a rapid movement from cotton to dairy and livestock farming was observed. The income from the average farm tripled.

On September 9, 1949, the townspeople elected Hugh Henry as mayor; P.B. Matthews, recorder; Joe Castleberry, treasurer; and these five aldermen: Div Williams, W.A. Dillaha, Marvin Cantrell, S.C. Case and C.R. Denton. J.A. Dickens was elected marshal. Mayors since 1949 have been: Royce Williams, Howard Lawrence, Percy Matthews (acting due to the resignation of Howard Lawrence), Cecil Garrett, Eddie Garrett (no relation), and D.P. (Press) Kelso.

The population in the incorporated area in 1980 was 1,423.

== Geography ==
Greenbrier is located in northwestern Faulkner County.

According to the United States Census Bureau, the city has a total area of 7.9 square miles (20.5 km^{2}), all land.

== Demographics ==
Historical population
Census	Pop.	Note	%±
1950	375		—
1960	401		6.9%
1970	582		45.1%
1980	1,423		144.5%
1990	2,130		49.7%
2000	3,042		42.8%
2010	4,706		54.7%
2020	5,707		21.3%
2025 (est.)	6,645	▲	16.4%
U.S. Decennial Census

=== 2020 census ===
As of the 2020 census, Greenbrier had a population of 5,707. The median age was 32.5 years. 28.9% of residents were under the age of 18 and 13.4% of residents were 65 years of age or older. For every 100 females there were 89.2 males, and for every 100 females age 18 and over there were 83.2 males age 18 and over.

0.0% of residents lived in urban areas, while 100.0% lived in rural areas.

There were 2,142 households and 1,365 families in the city. Of all households, 42.3% had children under the age of 18 living in them. 51.6% were married-couple households, 12.9% were households with a male householder and no spouse or partner present, and 29.1% were households with a female householder and no spouse or partner present. About 23.8% of all households were made up of individuals, and 11.3% had someone living alone who was 65 years of age or older.

There were 2,258 housing units, of which 5.1% were vacant. The homeowner vacancy rate was 1.4% and the rental vacancy rate was 5.4%.

Greenbrier racial composition
Race	Number	Percentage
White (non-Hispanic)	5,030	88.14%
Black or African American (non-Hispanic)	86	1.51%
Native American	31	0.54%
Asian	23	0.4%
Pacific Islander	2	0.04%
Other/Mixed	334	5.85%
Hispanic or Latino	201	3.52%

=== 2000 census ===
As of the census of 2000, there were 3,042 people, 1,137 households, and 892 families residing in the city. The population density was 392.6 inhabitants per square mile (151.6/km^{2}). There were 1,247 housing units at an average density of 160.9 per square mile (62.1/km^{2}). The racial makeup of the city was 97.37% White, 0.59% Black or African American, 0.46% Native American, 0.07% Asian, 0.36% from other races, and 1.15% from two or more races. 0.99% of the population were Hispanic or Latino of any race.

There were 1,137 households, out of which 42.5% had children under the age of 18 living with them, 61.7% were married couples living together, 13.2% had a female householder with no husband present, and 21.5% were non-families. 19.1% of all households were made up of individuals, and 7.0% had someone living alone who was 65 years of age or older. The average household size was 2.68 and the average family size was 3.06.

In the city, the population was spread out, with 30.3% under the age of 18, 9.1% from 18 to 24, 31.9% from 25 to 44, 18.9% from 45 to 64, and 9.8% who were 65 years of age or older. The median age was 32 years. For every 100 females, there were 92.3 males. For every 100 females age 18 and over, there were 86.6 males.

The median income for a household in the city was $37,351, and the median income for a family was $43,125. Males had a median income of $28,699 versus $24,630 for females. The per capita income for the city was $17,950. About 7.2% of families and 9.1% of the population were below the poverty line, including 11.0% of those under age 18 and 10.5% of those age 65 or over.

== Education ==
Public education for elementary and secondary school students is primarily provided by the Greenbrier School District, which leads to graduation from Greenbrier High School. Greenbrier was ranked #1 School District in the State.

== Earthquake swarm ==
On February 27, 2011, a magnitude 4.7 earthquake hit just outside Greenbrier. The quake was felt in several adjacent states, and as far away as Iowa. A swarm of almost 800 earthquakes have hit Arkansas since September 2010.

== Politics ==
Greenbrier is represented in the Arkansas House of Representatives by the Republican Stephen Meeks.

== Transportation ==
Intercity bus service to the city is provided by Jefferson Lines.
