= National Register of Historic Places listings in Faulkner County, Arkansas =

Location of Faulkner County in Arkansas

This is a list of the National Register of Historic Places listings in Faulkner County, Arkansas.

This is intended to be a complete list of the properties and districts on the National Register of Historic Places in Faulkner County, Arkansas, United States. The locations of National Register properties and districts for which the latitude and longitude coordinates are included below, may be seen in a map.

There are 66 properties and districts listed on the National Register in the county. Three sites that were once listed have been removed.

Contents: Counties in Arkansas
- Arkansas
- Ashley
- Baxter
- Benton
- Boone
- Bradley
- Calhoun
- Carroll
- Chicot
- Clark
- Clay
- Cleburne
- Cleveland
- Columbia
- Conway
- Craighead
- Crawford
- Crittenden
- Cross
- Dallas
- Desha
- Drew
- Faulkner
- Franklin
- Fulton
- Garland
- Grant
- Greene
- Hempstead
- Hot Spring
- Howard
- Independence
- Izard
- Jackson
- Jefferson
- Johnson
- Lafayette
- Lawrence
- Lee
- Lincoln
- Little River
- Logan
- Lonoke
- Madison
- Marion
- Miller
- Mississippi
- Monroe
- Montgomery
- Nevada
- Newton
- Ouachita
- Perry
- Phillips
- Pike
- Poinsett
- Polk
- Pope
- Prairie
- Pulaski (Little Rock)
- Randolph
- St. Francis
- Saline
- Scott
- Searcy
- Sebastian
- Sevier
- Sharp
- Stone
- Union
- Van Buren
- Washington
- White
- Woodruff
- Yell

This National Park Service list is complete through NPS recent listings posted December 19, 2025.

== Current listings ==
	Name on the Register	Image	Date listed	Location	City or town	Description
1	Administration Building, University of Central Arkansas	Administration Building, University of Central Arkansas	January 24, 2011 (#10001153)	201 Donaghey Ave. 35°04′45″N 92°27′26″W	Conway	
2	Blessing Farmstead	Blessing Farmstead	September 5, 1990 (#90001369)	North of Enola; 35°15′08″N 92°14′30″W	Barney	
3	Brown House	Brown House	December 22, 1982 (#82000811)	1604 Caldwell St. 35°05′24″N 92°26′44″W	Conway	
4	Cadron Settlement	Cadron Settlement	May 17, 1974 (#74000475)	Highway 319W at Cadron Settlement Ln. 35°06′26″N 92°32′44″W	Conway	A Trail of Tears site, with early French and American settlements.
5	Castleberry-Harrington Historic District	Castleberry-Harrington Historic District	June 5, 2007 (#07000503)	Castleberry Rd. 35°15′36″N 92°25′36″W	Republican	
6	Centerville United Methodist Church		May 17, 2024 (#100010313)	271 McNew Cemetery Road; 35°16′25″N 92°15′22″W	Greenbrier	
7	Century Flyer	Century Flyer	May 28, 2010 (#10000284)	150 E. Siebenmorgan Rd. 35°05′56″N 92°25′45″W	Conway	Amusement park train on the grounds of the Conway Human Development Center
8	Church of Christ	Church of Christ	February 15, 2005 (#05000040)	Highway 310; 35°19′33″N 92°20′07″W	Guy	
9	Conway Commercial Historic District	Conway Commercial Historic District	September 23, 2010 (#10000779)	Roughly bounded by Main St. on the south, Harkrider St. and Spencer St. on the east, just south of Mill St. to the north, and Locust St. 35°05′34″N 92°26′24″W	Conway	
10	Conway Confederate Monument	Conway Confederate Monument	April 26, 1996 (#96000455)	Southwestern corner of the courthouse lawn, east of the junction of Robinson Ave. and Center St. 35°05′19″N 92°26′35″W	Conway	
11	Conway Mayes Marker	Conway Mayes Marker	November 8, 2024 (#100010832)	487 U.S. 64 East; 35°05′08″N 92°19′51″W	Conway	Folk art marker by Henry Harrison Mayes.
12	Earl and Oza Crownover-Brown House	Earl and Oza Crownover-Brown House	March 2, 2006 (#06000088)	133 S. Broadway; 35°21′25″N 92°24′48″W	Damascus	
13	O.L. Dunaway House	O.L. Dunaway House	July 19, 1996 (#96000797)	920 Center St. 35°05′26″N 92°26′42″W	Conway	
14	Richard and Mettie Ealy House	Richard and Mettie Ealy House	September 30, 2005 (#05001069)	280 Solomon Grove Rd. 35°18′45″N 92°26′51″W	Twin Groves	
15	Farmers State Bank	Farmers State Bank	December 22, 1982 (#82000812)	1001 Front St. 35°05′31″N 92°26′28″W	Conway	
16	Faulkner County Courthouse	Faulkner County Courthouse	November 27, 1995 (#95001381)	801 Locust St. 35°05′20″N 92°26′34″W	Conway	
17	Faulkner County Jail	Faulkner County Jail	July 20, 1978 (#78000585)	Courthouse Sq. 35°05′21″N 92°26′37″W	Conway	
18	First United Methodist Church	First United Methodist Church	November 20, 1992 (#92001623)	Northwestern corner of the junction of Prince and Clifton Sts. 35°05′32″N 92°26′44″W	Conway	
19	Frauenthal & Schwarz Building	Frauenthal & Schwarz Building	October 23, 1992 (#92000956)	824 Front St. 35°05′29″N 92°26′27″W	Conway	
20	Frauenthal House	Frauenthal House	December 22, 1982 (#82000814)	631 Western; 35°05′14″N 92°27′28″W	Conway	
21	Galloway Hall	Galloway Hall	December 22, 1982 (#82000953)	Hendrix College campus 35°06′06″N 92°26′28″W	Conway	
22	Dennis and Christine Garrison House	Dennis and Christine Garrison House	September 29, 2005 (#05001070)	105 Garrison Rd. 35°14′25″N 92°27′03″W	Greenbrier	
23	Greeson-Cone House	Greeson-Cone House	September 7, 1995 (#95001094)	928 Center St. 35°05′28″N 92°26′41″W	Conway	
24	Guy High School Gymnasium	Guy High School Gymnasium	September 10, 1992 (#92001196)	Highway 25; 35°19′24″N 92°19′24″W	Guy	
25	Guy Home Economics Building	Guy Home Economics Building	September 10, 1992 (#92001197)	Highway 25; 35°19′25″N 92°19′22″W	Guy	
26	Charlie Hall House	Charlie Hall House	June 1, 2005 (#05000492)	221 Old U.S. Route 65; 35°20′25″N 92°23′59″W	Twin Groves	
27	Hall-Hogan Grocery Store	Hall-Hogan Grocery Store	September 30, 2013 (#13000785)	1364 Mitchell; 35°05′53″N 92°26′58″W	Conway	
28	Frank U. Halter House	Frank U. Halter House	August 29, 1980 (#80000776)	1355 College Ave. 35°05′03″N 92°26′26″W	Conway	
29	Hardy Cemetery	Hardy Cemetery	October 8, 2009 (#09000798)	722 Highway 225, E. 35°15′24″N 92°15′15″W	Centerville	
30	Harton House	Harton House	May 25, 1979 (#79000438)	1821 Robinson Ave. 35°05′16″N 92°26′56″W	Conway	
31	D.O. Harton House	D.O. Harton House	July 19, 1996 (#96000796)	607 Davis St. 35°05′11″N 92°26′53″W	Conway	
32	Hendrix College Addition Neighborhood Historic District	Hendrix College Addition Neighborhood Historic District	September 20, 2007 (#07000973)	Roughly bounded by Washington Ave., Fleming St., Harkrider St., and Winfield St. 35°06′16″N 92°26′34″W	Conway	
33	Michael M. Hiegel House	Michael M. Hiegel House	August 14, 1998 (#98000912)	504 2nd St. 35°05′17″N 92°25′57″W	Conway	
34	E.E. Hooten House	E.E. Hooten House	February 15, 2005 (#05000039)	400 Highway 25, N. 35°19′13″N 92°20′17″W	Guy	
35	Farris and Evelyn Langley House	Farris and Evelyn Langley House	June 1, 2005 (#05000493)	12 Langley Ln. 35°17′17″N 92°23′53″W	Republican	
36	Lasley's College Apartments	Lasley's College Apartments	May 25, 2011 (#11000300)	1916 & 1922 Bruce St. 35°04′58″N 92°27′03″W	Conway	
37	Lee Service Station	Lee Service Station	February 15, 2005 (#05000044)	28 S. Broadway; 35°21′56″N 92°24′38″W	Damascus	
38	Liberty School Cafeteria	Liberty School Cafeteria	September 10, 1992 (#92001195)	Highway 36, north of its junction with U.S. Route 64; 35°04′53″N 92°18′21″W	Hamlet	
39	J.E. Little House	J.E. Little House	January 26, 1999 (#98001631)	427 Western Ave. 35°05′03″N 92°27′22″W	Conway	
40	Martin Hall	Martin Hall	December 22, 1982 (#82000815)	Hendrix College campus 35°05′58″N 92°26′28″W	Conway	
41	Merritt House	Merritt House	September 28, 2005 (#05001071)	139 N. Broadview; 35°15′15″N 92°23′16″W	Greenbrier	
42	S.D. Merritt House	S.D. Merritt House	February 15, 2005 (#05000038)	45 Highway 25, N. 35°16′24″N 92°22′59″W	Greenbrier	
43	Military Road-Cadron Segment		January 28, 2004 (#03001490)	Address Restricted	Conway	A segment of the Trail of Tears
44	Mt. Zion Missionary Baptist Church	Mt. Zion Missionary Baptist Church	February 5, 2009 (#09000003)	249 Highway 107; 35°11′46″N 92°12′12″W	Enola	
45	Oak Grove Cemetery Historic Section	Oak Grove Cemetery Historic Section	November 4, 2009 (#09000341)	E. Bruce St. approximately 0.3 miles (0.48 km) east of Harkrider St. 35°04′51″N 92°25′50″W	Conway	
46	Silas Owens Sr. House	Silas Owens Sr. House	February 15, 2005 (#05000045)	157 Solomon Grove Rd. 35°19′16″N 92°26′04″W	Twin Groves	
47	Patton House	Patton House	September 30, 1993 (#93001026)	Highway 25; 35°12′04″N 92°27′09″W	Wooster	
48	President's House	President's House	December 22, 1982 (#82000816)	Hendrix College campus 35°05′53″N 92°26′32″W	Conway	Now known as Ellis Hall
49	Quattlebaum-Pelletier House	Quattlebaum-Pelletier House	June 1, 2005 (#05000494)	43 Ozark; 35°18′10″N 92°23′56″W	Twin Groves	
50	Frank E. Robins House	Frank E. Robins House	May 20, 1994 (#94000497)	567 Locust St. 35°05′09″N 92°26′29″W	Conway	
51	Reuben W. Robins House	Reuben W. Robins House	September 28, 2005 (#05001072)	508 Locust St. 35°05′14″N 92°26′26″W	Conway	
52	Robinson Historic District	Robinson Historic District	January 29, 2001 (#00001645)	Roughly bounded by Cross, Prince, Faulkner, and Watkins Sts., and Robinson Ave. 35°05′23″N 92°26′54″W	Conway	
53	James and Jewell Salter House		June 1, 2005 (#05000495)	159 S. Broadview; 35°12′50″N 92°23′19″W	Greenbrier	
54	Scull Historic District	Scull Historic District	September 21, 2017 (#100001647)	428 & 432 Conway Blvd. 35°05′02″N 92°26′37″W	Conway	
55	Sellers House	Sellers House	February 15, 2005 (#05000042)	89 Acklin Gap Rd. 35°08′05″N 92°23′23″W	Conway	
56	S.G. Smith House	S.G. Smith House	December 22, 1982 (#82000853)	1837 Caldwell St. 35°05′24″N 92°27′01″W	Conway	
57	Solomon Grove Smith-Hughes Building	Solomon Grove Smith-Hughes Building	December 9, 1994 (#94001461)	South of County Road 29; 35°19′14″N 92°26′00″W	Twin Groves	
58	Spears House	Spears House	February 15, 2005 (#05000043)	1235 U.S. Route 65, N. 35°17′11″N 92°23′32″W	Greenbrier	
59	Springfield Bridge	Springfield Bridge	July 21, 1988 (#88000660)	Beaverfork Lake Park; 35°08′30″N 92°27′13″W	Conway	Moved in 2017.
60	Titan II ICBM Launch Complex Site 373-9		September 14, 2020 (#100005583)	23 Missile Base Rd. 35°08′42″N 92°15′13″W	Vilonia	
61	Titan II ICBM Launch Complex 374-5 Site	Titan II ICBM Launch Complex 374-5 Site	February 18, 2000 (#98001433)	East of U.S. Route 65, 0.4 miles (0.64 km) north of its junction with E. Cadron Ridge Rd. 35°09′52″N 92°23′46″W	Springhill	
62	Tyler-Southerland House	Tyler-Southerland House	October 19, 2005 (#05001168)	36 Southerland; 35°04′17″N 92°24′20″W	Conway	
63	University of Central Arkansas Historic District	University of Central Arkansas Historic District	March 13, 2013 (#13000064)	201 Donaghey Ave. 35°04′49″N 92°27′18″W	Conway	
64	Earl and Mildred Ward House	Earl and Mildred Ward House	October 19, 2005 (#05001169)	1157 Mitchell St. 35°05′40″N 92°26′59″W	Conway	
65	Washburn House	Washburn House	January 23, 2007 (#06001279)	40 Battles Loop; 35°19′03″N 92°21′31″W	Guy	
66	Young Memorial	Young Memorial	July 19, 1996 (#96000758)	1601 Harkrider Dr., north of Reynolds Science Hall; 35°06′01″N 92°26′30″W	Conway	

== Former listings ==
	Name on the Register	Image	Date listed	Date removed	Location	City or town	Description
1	First Baptist Church		December 22, 1982 (#82000813)	January 14, 2002	Davis and Robinson Street	Conway	
2	Main Hall, Central College		December 6, 1975 (#75000385)	June 3, 1986	1509 College Ave., Central Baptist College	Conway	
3	Joe and Nina Webb House		October 19, 2005 (#05001171)	September 25, 2012	2945 Prince	Conway	

== See also ==
- List of National Historic Landmarks in Arkansas
- National Register of Historic Places listings in Arkansas
