= Ellis Hall =

Ellis Hall may refer to:

- Ellis Hall (footballer)
- Ellis Hall (musician)
- Ellis Hall (Hendrix College)
