= Hardy Cemetery (Centerville, Faulkner County, Arkansas) =

Historic cemetery in Arkansas, United States

- U.S. National Register of Historic Places
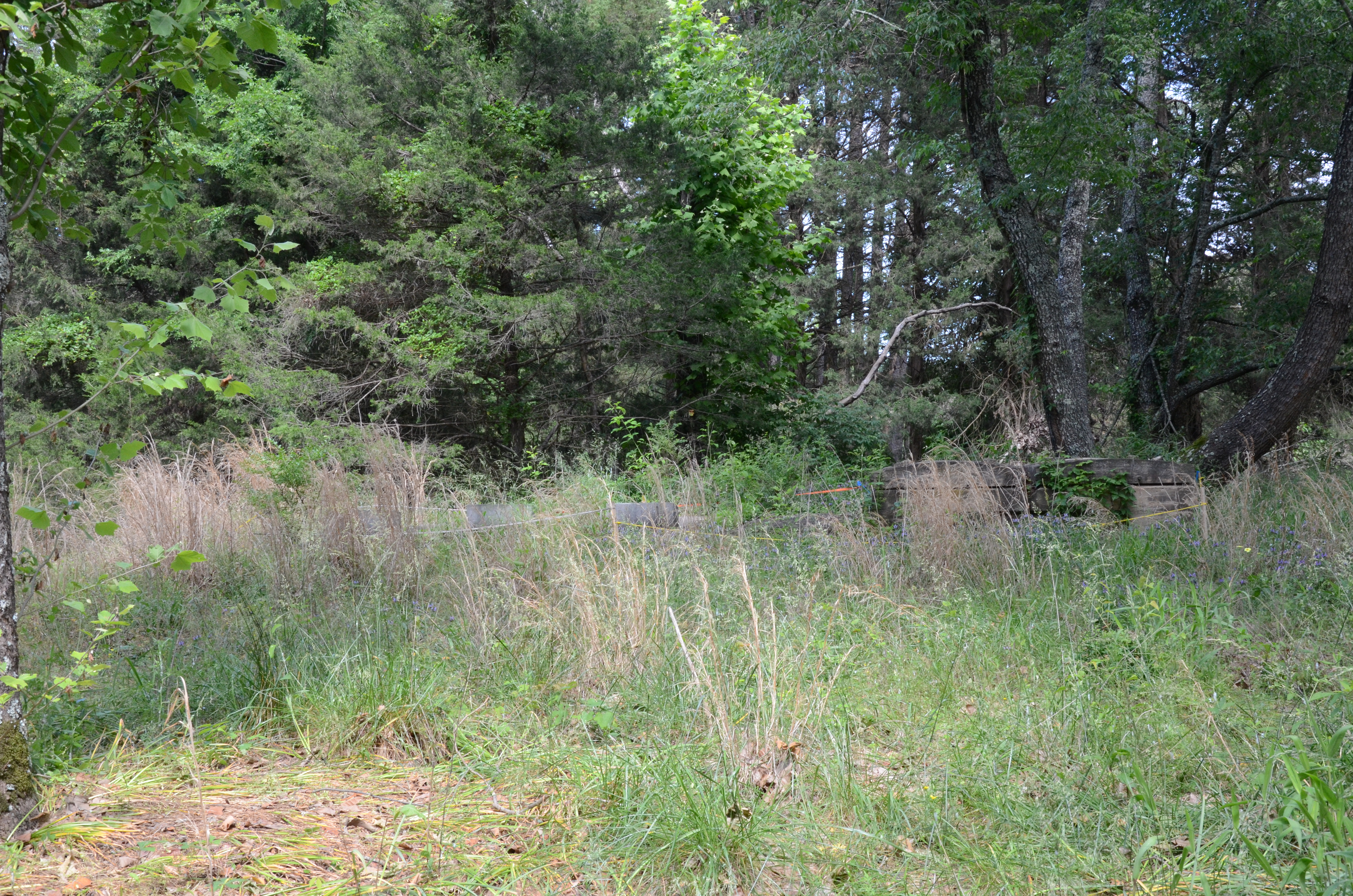

- Location within Arkansas Location within the United States
- Location: 722 AR 225 E., Centerville, Faulkner County, Arkansas
- Coordinates: 35°15′35″N 92°15′3″W
- Area: 3 acres (1.2 ha)
- Built: 1939
- NRHP reference No.: 09000798
- Added to NRHP: October 8, 2009

The Hardy Cemetery is a historic cemetery at 722 Arkansas Highway 225 East in Centerville, Faulkner County, Arkansas. It is set on 3 acres (1.2 ha) fringed by cedar trees. It consists of six barrel-vaulted tombs, all built to house members of the Hardy family, whose patriarch, Dr. Henry Baxton Hardy, was a prominent local doctor and politician. Only three of the tombs are occupied, by Dr. Hardy, his wife Cora, and Marco, one of his seven children. The others remained unoccupied due a rift in family relations.

The cemetery was listed on the National Register of Historic Places in 2009.

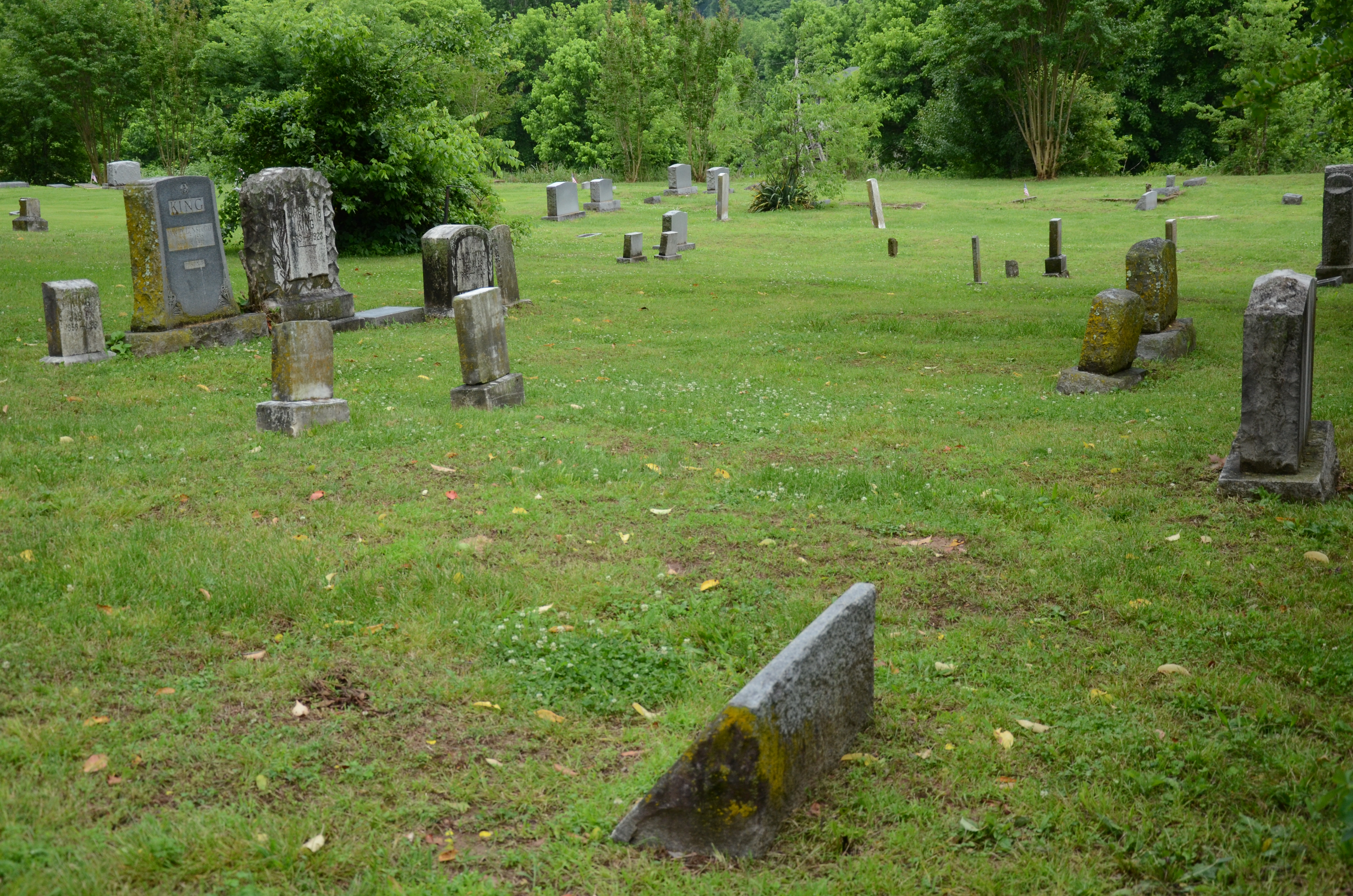
Historic Section 1 of 3

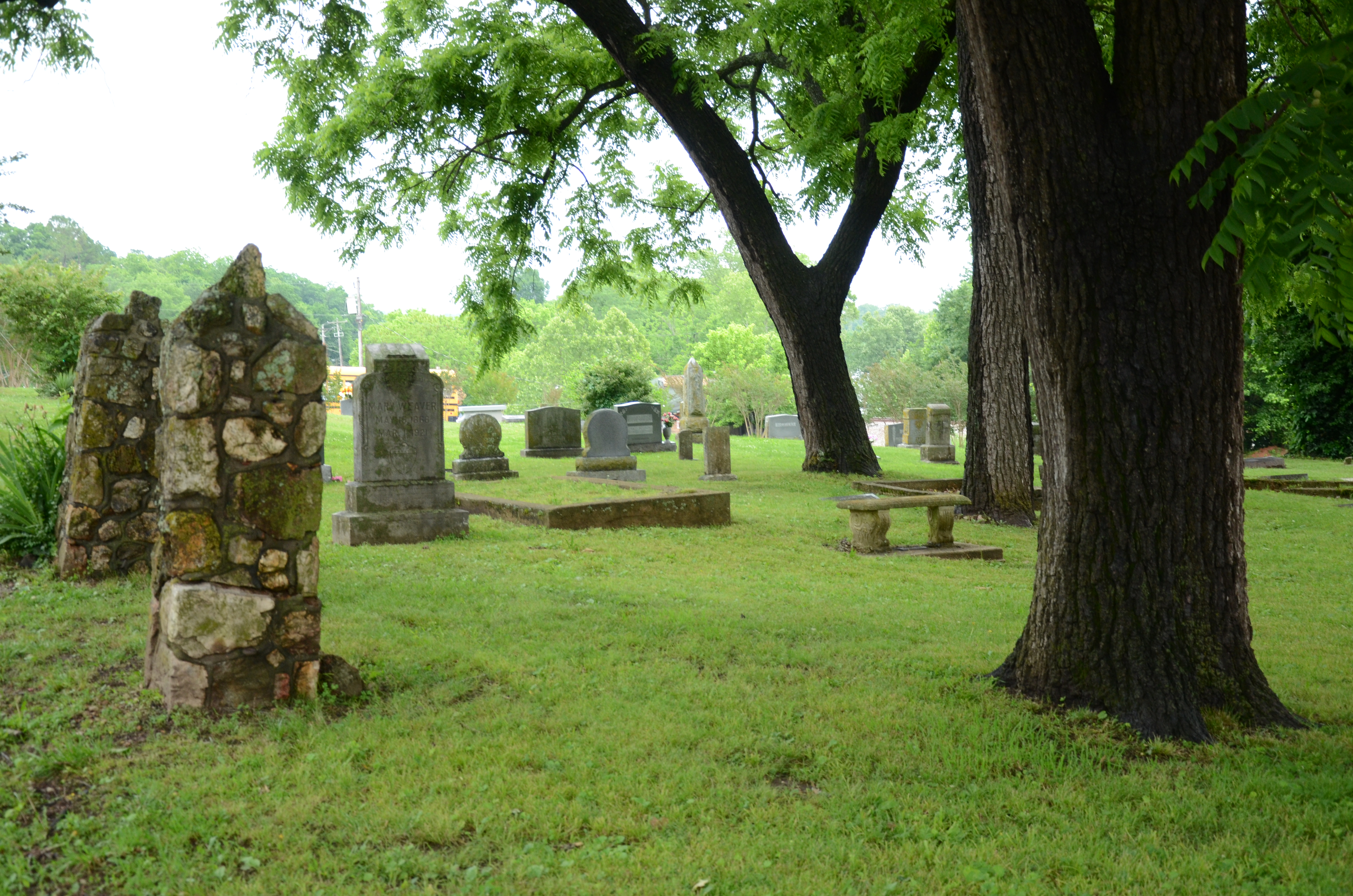
Historic Section 2 of 3

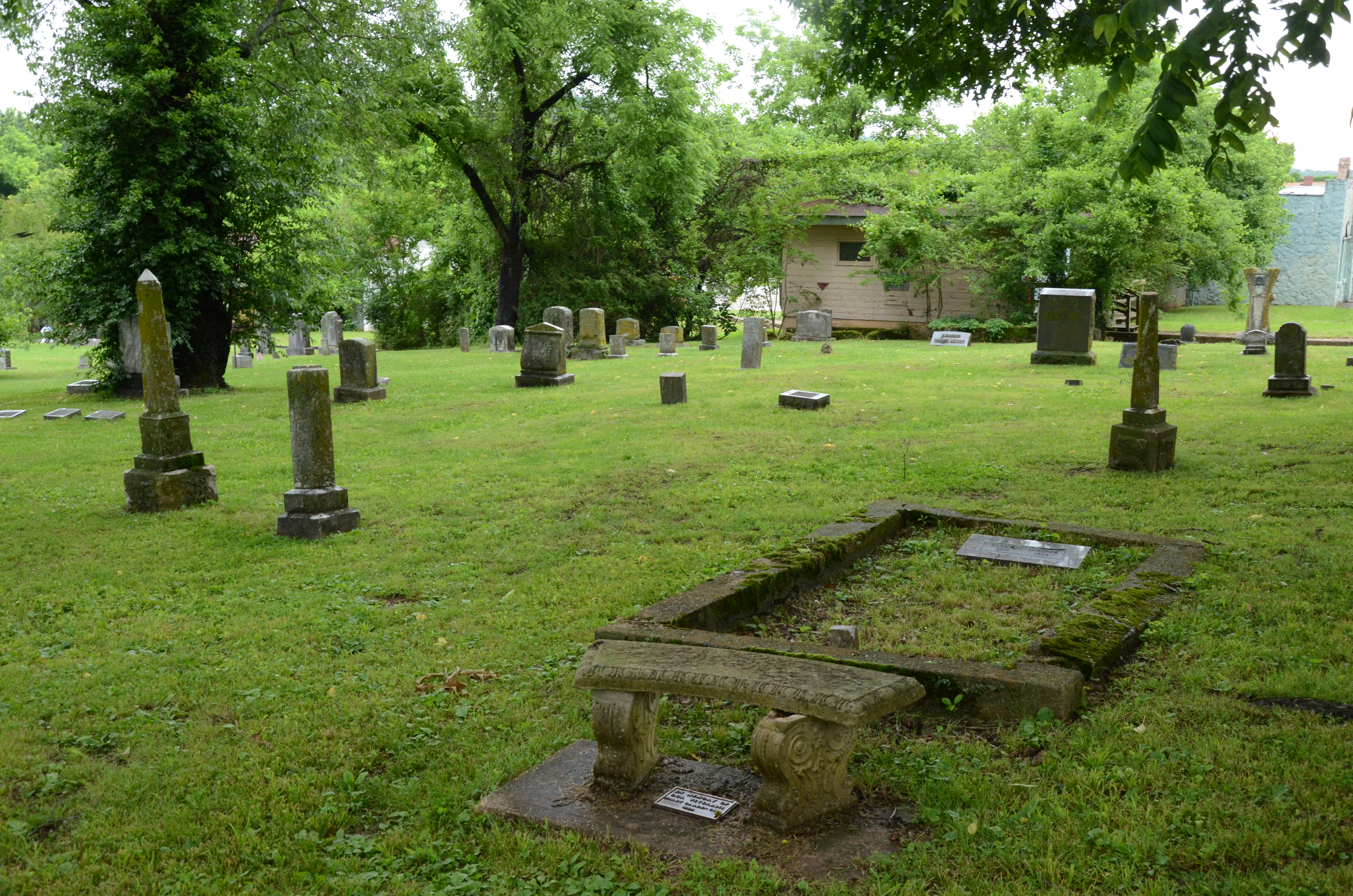
Historic Section 3 of 3

== See also ==
- National Register of Historic Places listings in Faulkner County, Arkansas
