= Silas Owens Sr. House =

Historic house in Arkansas, United States

- U.S. National Register of Historic Places
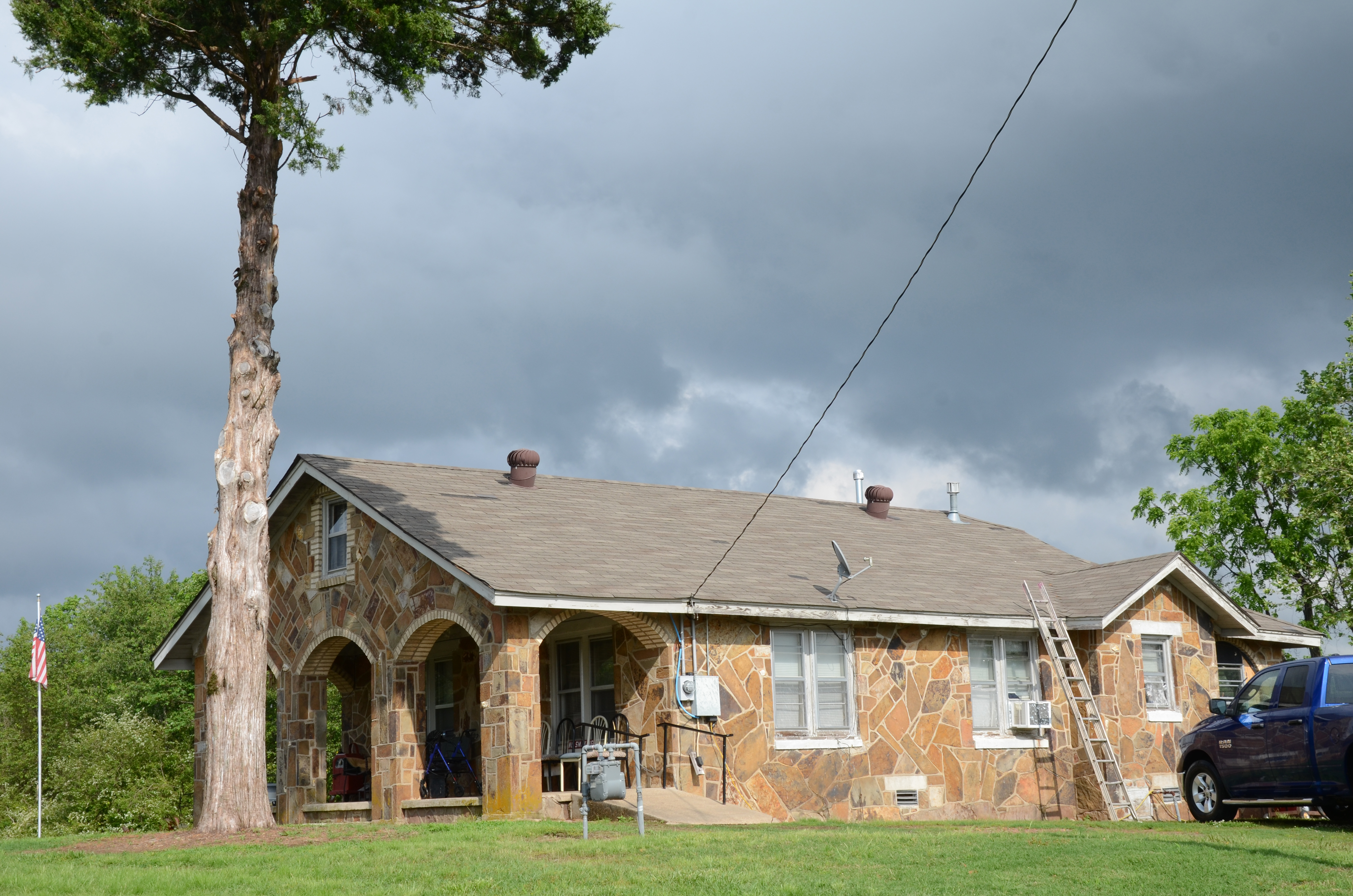

- Location within Arkansas Location within the United States
- Location: 157 Solomon Grove Rd., Twin Groves, Arkansas
- Coordinates: 35°19′16″N 92°26′4″W
- Area: less than one acre
- Built: 1948
- Built by: Owens, Silas Sr.
- MPS: Mixed Masonry Buildings of Silas Owens, Sr. MPS
- NRHP reference No.: 05000045
- Added to NRHP: February 15, 2005

The Silas Owens Sr. House is a historic house at 157 Solomon Grove Road in Twin Groves, Arkansas. It is a single-story masonry structure, built out of fieldstone with cream-colored brick and concrete trim elements. It has a gable roof with exposed rafter ends, and its front has an arcade of three segmented-arch openings. The house was built about 1948 by Silas Owens, Sr., a prominent regional master mason, as his family home. While the work is typical of his high quality, its use of cream-colored brick (one of his hallmarks) is unusually restrained.

The house was listed on the National Register of Historic Places in 2005.

== See also ==
- National Register of Historic Places listings in Faulkner County, Arkansas
