= Solomon Grove Smith–Hughes Building =

- U.S. National Register of Historic Places
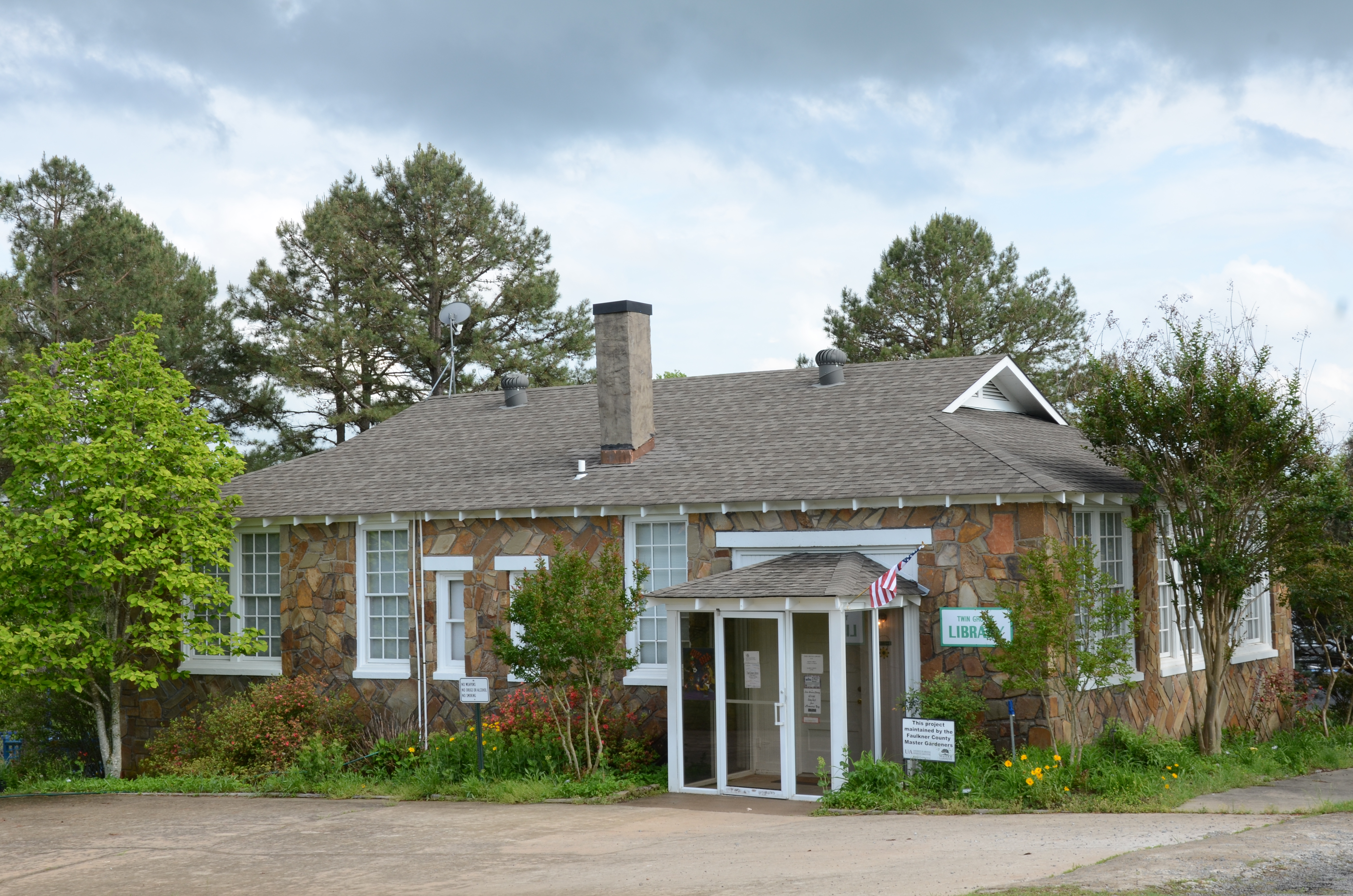

- Location within Arkansas Location within the United States
- Location: S of Co. Rd. 29, Twin Groves, Arkansas
- Coordinates: 35°19′14″N 92°26′0″W
- Area: 2 acres (0.81 ha)
- Built: 1939
- Built by: Silas Owens Sr.
- MPS: Public Schools in the Ozarks MPS
- NRHP reference No.: 94001461
- Added to NRHP: December 9, 1994

The Solomon Grove Smith–Hughes Building is a historic community building on Solomon Grove Road in Twin Groves, Arkansas. It is a single-story stone structure, built out of locally quarried stone and covered by a gable-on-hip roof. It was built in 1938 with funding support form the Works Progress Administration, and first served as a school. It was built by the African-American mason Silas Owens Sr. on land he sold to the city in 1937. It now houses a library.

The building was listed on the National Register of Historic Places in 1994.

== See also ==
- National Register of Historic Places listings in Faulkner County, Arkansas
