= Quattlebaum–Pelletier House =

Historic house in Arkansas, United States

- U.S. National Register of Historic Places
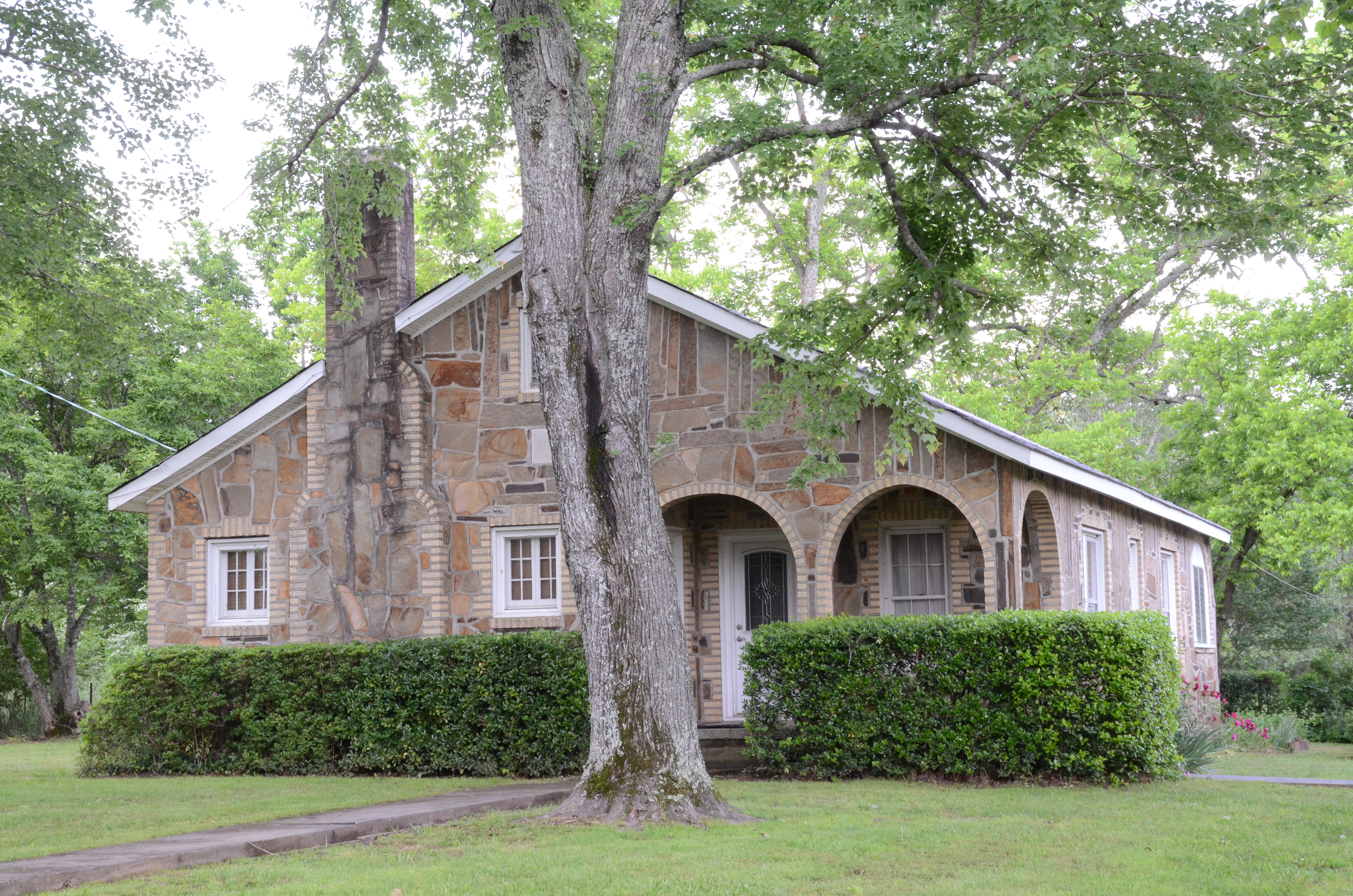

- Location within Arkansas Location within the United States
- Location: 43 Ozark, Twin Groves, Arkansas
- Coordinates: 35°18′10″N 92°23′56″W
- Area: less than one acre
- Built: 1942
- Architect: Silas Owens Sr.
- Architectural style: Late 19th And 20th Century Revivals, Mixed Masonry
- MPS: Mixed Masonry Buildings of Silas Owens Sr. MPS
- NRHP reference No.: 05000494
- Added to NRHP: June 1, 2005

The Quattlebaum–Pelletier House is a historic house at 43 Ozark Street in Twin Groves, Arkansas. It is a single-story masonry structure, its exterior finished in a combination of fieldstone veneer and cream-colored brick. Built in 1942, it has many of the hallmarks of the work of Silas Owens Sr., a regionally prominent African-American mason, including an arcaded recessed porch, and the types of exterior materials used. Owens departed from his usually herringbone pattern for laying the stone on the walls, instead using longer and thinner sandstone in a geometric pattern.

The house was listed on the National Register of Historic Places in 2005.

== See also ==
- National Register of Historic Places listings in Faulkner County, Arkansas
