= Hall–Hogan Grocery Store =

- Hall-Hogan Grocery Store
- U.S. National Register of Historic Places
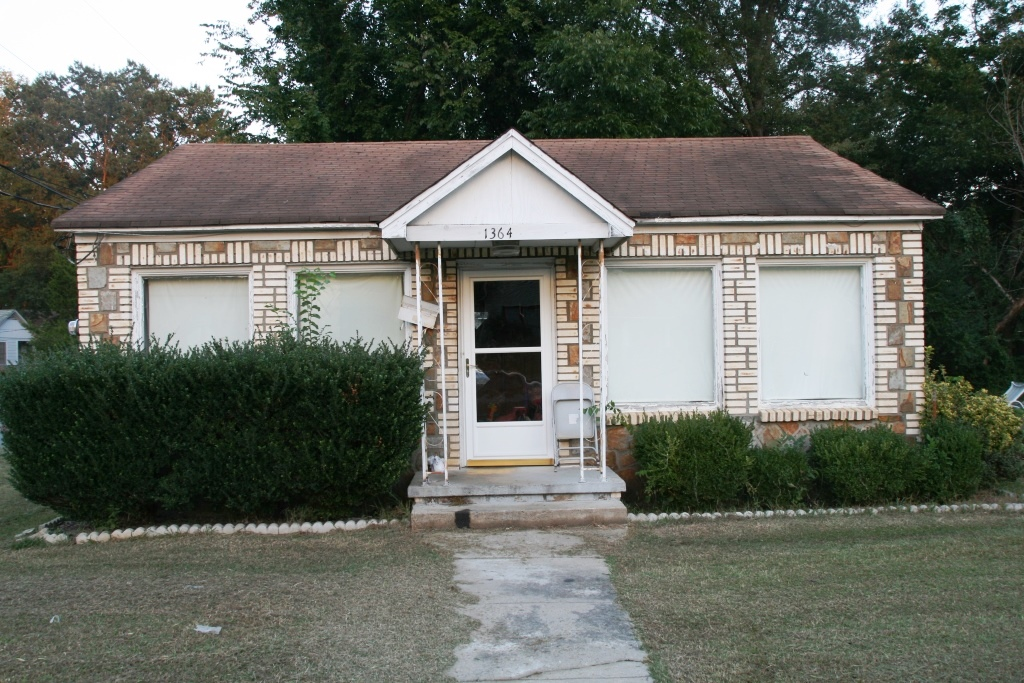

- Location within Arkansas Location within the United States
- Location: 1364 Mitchell St., Conway, Arkansas
- Coordinates: 35°5′53″N 92°26′58″W
- Area: less than one acre
- Built: 1948
- Architect: Silas Owens Sr.
- Architectural style: Mixed masonry
- NRHP reference No.: 13000785
- Added to NRHP: September 30, 2013

The Hall–Hogan Grocery Store is a historic building at 1364 Mitchell Street in Conway, Arkansas. Originally built as a small retail store, it now serves as a private residence. It is a single-story gable-roofed structure, built out of stone with cream-colored trim. The stone, local fieldstone, is laid in a herringbone pattern that is, along with the brick trim, a signature of Silas Owens, Sr., a locally renowned master mason. The main facade is five bays wide, with display windows in the outer four bays, and the entrance at the center, sheltered by a gabled porch.

The building was listed on the U.S. National Register of Historic Places in 2013.

== See also ==
- National Register of Historic Places listings in Faulkner County, Arkansas
