= J.E. Little House =

Historic house in Arkansas, United States

- U.S. National Register of Historic Places
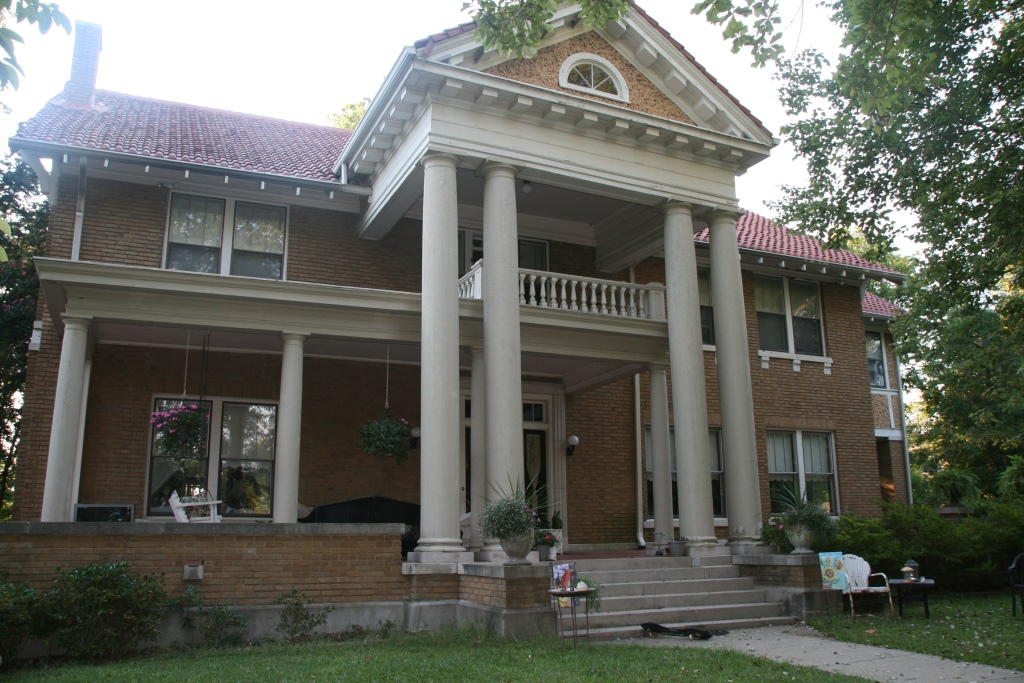

- Location within Arkansas Location within the United States
- Location: 427 Western Ave., Conway, Arkansas
- Coordinates: 35°5′3″N 92°27′22″W
- Area: less than one acre
- Built: 1919
- Architectural style: Classical Revival, Bungalow/craftsman
- NRHP reference No.: 98001631
- Added to NRHP: January 26, 1999

The J.E. Little House is a historic house at 427 Western Avenue in Conway, Arkansas, USA. It is a two-story masonry structure, its walls finished in brick and stucco, with a gabled tile roof that has exposed rafter ends and brackets in the Craftsman style. Its most prominent feature is a projecting two-story Greek temple portico, supported by Tuscan columns. It shelters a balcony set on the roof of a single-story porch, which extends to the left of the portico. It was built in 1919 for John Elijah Little, a local businessman who was a major benefactor of both Hendrix College and Faulkner County Hospital.

The house was listed on the National Register of Historic Places in 1999.

== See also ==
- National Register of Historic Places listings in Faulkner County, Arkansas
