= Young Memorial =

World War I memorial in Arkansas

- U.S. National Register of Historic Places
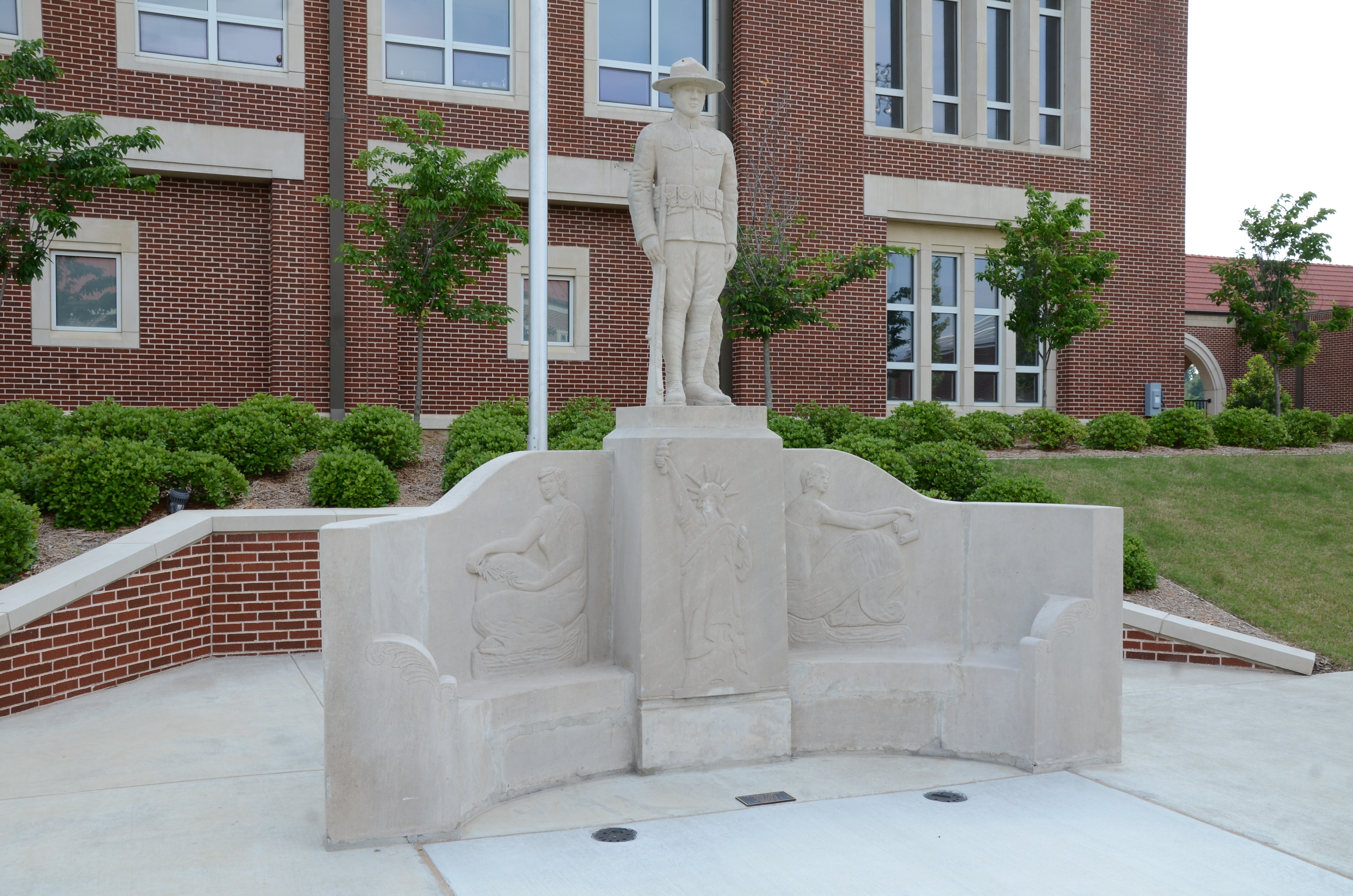

- Location within Arkansas Location within the United States
- Location: 1601 Harkrider Dr., N of Reynolds Science Hall, Hendrix College campus, Conway, Arkansas
- Coordinates: 35°6′1″N 92°26′30″W
- Area: less than one acre
- Built: 1920
- Architect: Currie, George
- Architectural style: Classical Revival
- NRHP reference No.: 96000758
- Added to NRHP: July 19, 1996

The Young Memorial, also known as the War Memorial Monument, is a World War I memorial located on the campus of Hendrix College in Conway, Arkansas. The sculpture consists of a semicircular seating area, its wings flanking a central square pedestal on which stands a carved rendition of a doughboy. The face of the pedestal bears a relief of the Statue of Liberty, while the backs of the seats have reliefs of female figures, one representing Liberty and the other Peace. The memorial was designed by Hendrix College Professor George Currie, and was placed in 1920.

The memorial was listed on the National Register of Historic Places in 1996.

Originally installed on the west side of Tabor Hall, the memorial has been relocated 5 times. After its 2013 restoration it was relocated to the Young-Wise Memorial Plaza where it stands near sculptures honoring two former Hendrix students who died in Afghanistan.

== See also ==
- National Register of Historic Places listings in Faulkner County, Arkansas
