= Administration Building, University of Central Arkansas =

- U.S. National Register of Historic Places
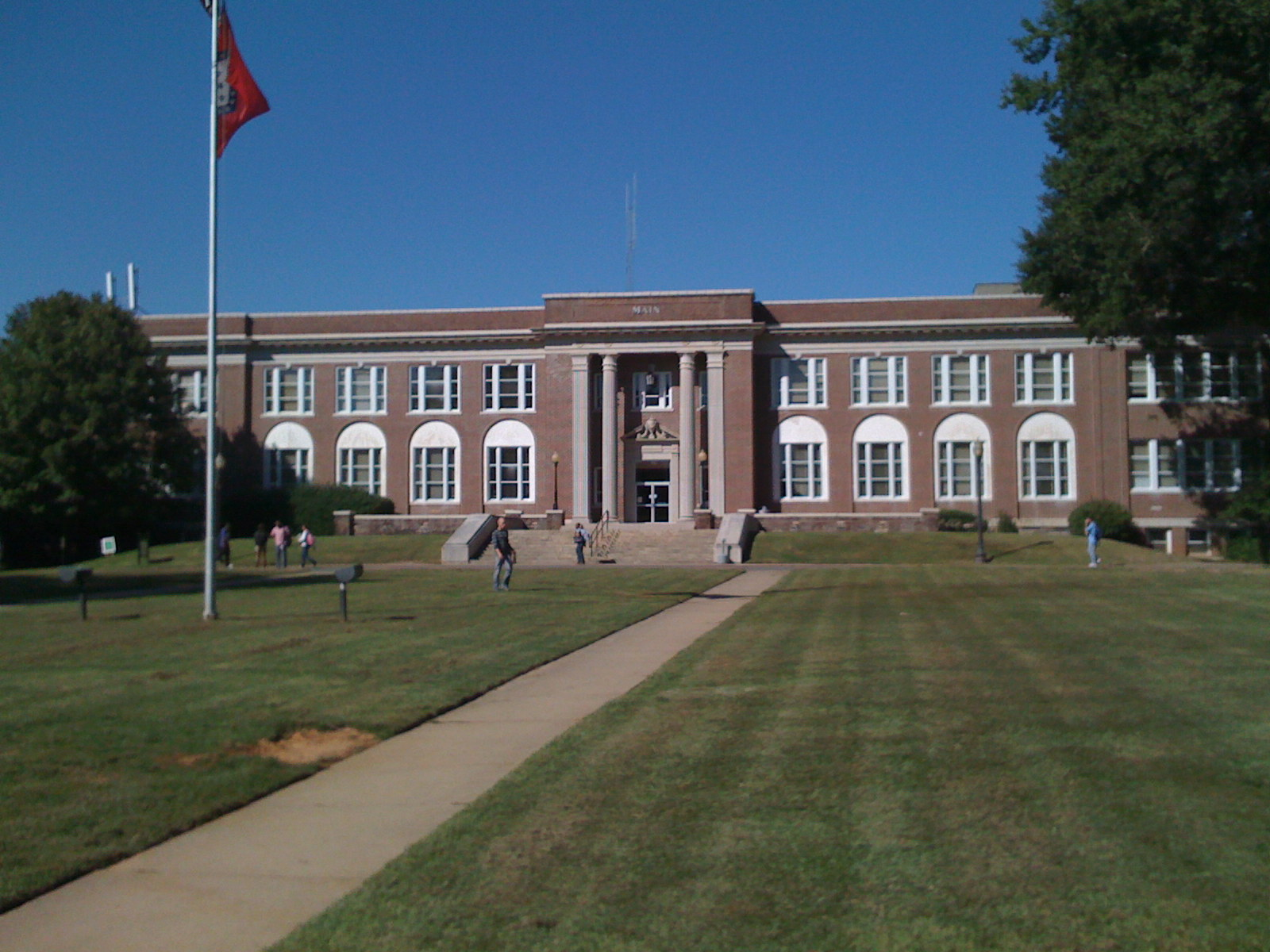

- Location within Arkansas Location within the United States
- Location: University of Central Arkansas campus, Conway, Arkansas
- Coordinates: 35°4′45″N 92°27′26″W
- Area: less than one acre
- Built: 1919
- Architect: John Parks Almand
- Architectural style: Classical Revival
- NRHP reference No.: 10001153
- Added to NRHP: January 24, 2011

The Administration Building of the University of Central Arkansas, also known as Old Main, is located on the university's campus at 201 Donaghey Avenue in Conway, Arkansas. Completed in 1918, it is the oldest building on campus. This building was built in 1919, with the Ida Waldran Auditorium added in 1937. It was designed by John Parks Almand, and was built by George Donaghey, the man for whom Donaghey Avenue is named and a former Governor of Arkansas. It served a dual role as the administration building and as a classroom building, and its Classical Revival style became a template by which other campus buildings were designed. It continued to serve as the administration building until the 1960s.

The building was listed on the National Register of Historic Places in 2011.

== See also ==
- National Register of Historic Places listings in Faulkner County, Arkansas
