= Hendrix College Addition Neighborhood Historic District =

Historic district in Arkansas, United States

- U.S. National Register of Historic Places
- U.S. Historic district
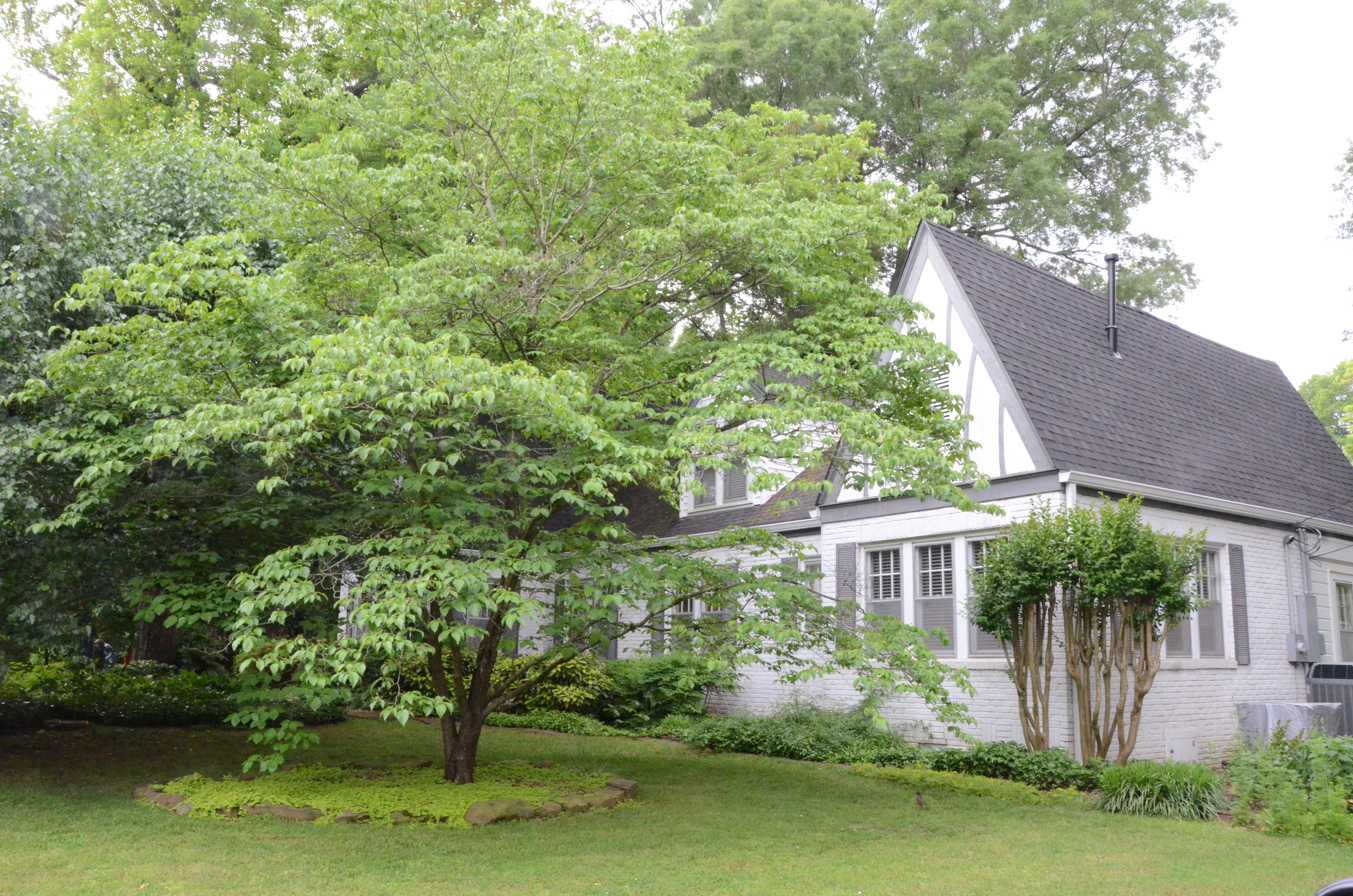

- Location within Arkansas Location within the United States
- Location: Roughly bounded by Washington Ave., Fleming St., Harkrider St. and Winfield St., Conway, Arkansas
- Coordinates: 35°6′16″N 92°26′34″W
- Area: 40 acres (16 ha)
- Built: 1903
- Built by: multiple, including F.L. Scull
- Architectural style: Colonial Revival, Prairie School, Minimal traditional
- NRHP reference No.: 07000973
- Added to NRHP: September 20, 2007

The Hendrix College Addition Neighborhood Historic District encompasses a predominantly residential area of Conway, Arkansas that was developed in the first half of the 20th century. Located just north of the Hendrix College campus, it is an area of about 40 acres (16 ha) and twelve square blocks, bounded on the south by Winfield Street, the west by Washington Avenue, the east by Harkrider Street, and the north by Fleming Street. Architecturally, the houses in the neighborhood represent a cross-section of styles popular in the period, from the Prairie School and English Revival, to post-World War II ranch houses. The land had been acquired by Hendrix College when it relocated to Conway in the 1890s, and was developed as a way to pay off some of the debts incurred because of the move. It was one of the city's first formally platted subdivisions.

The district was listed on the National Register of Historic Places in 2007.

== See also ==
- National Register of Historic Places listings in Faulkner County, Arkansas
