= Galloway Hall =

- U.S. National Register of Historic Places
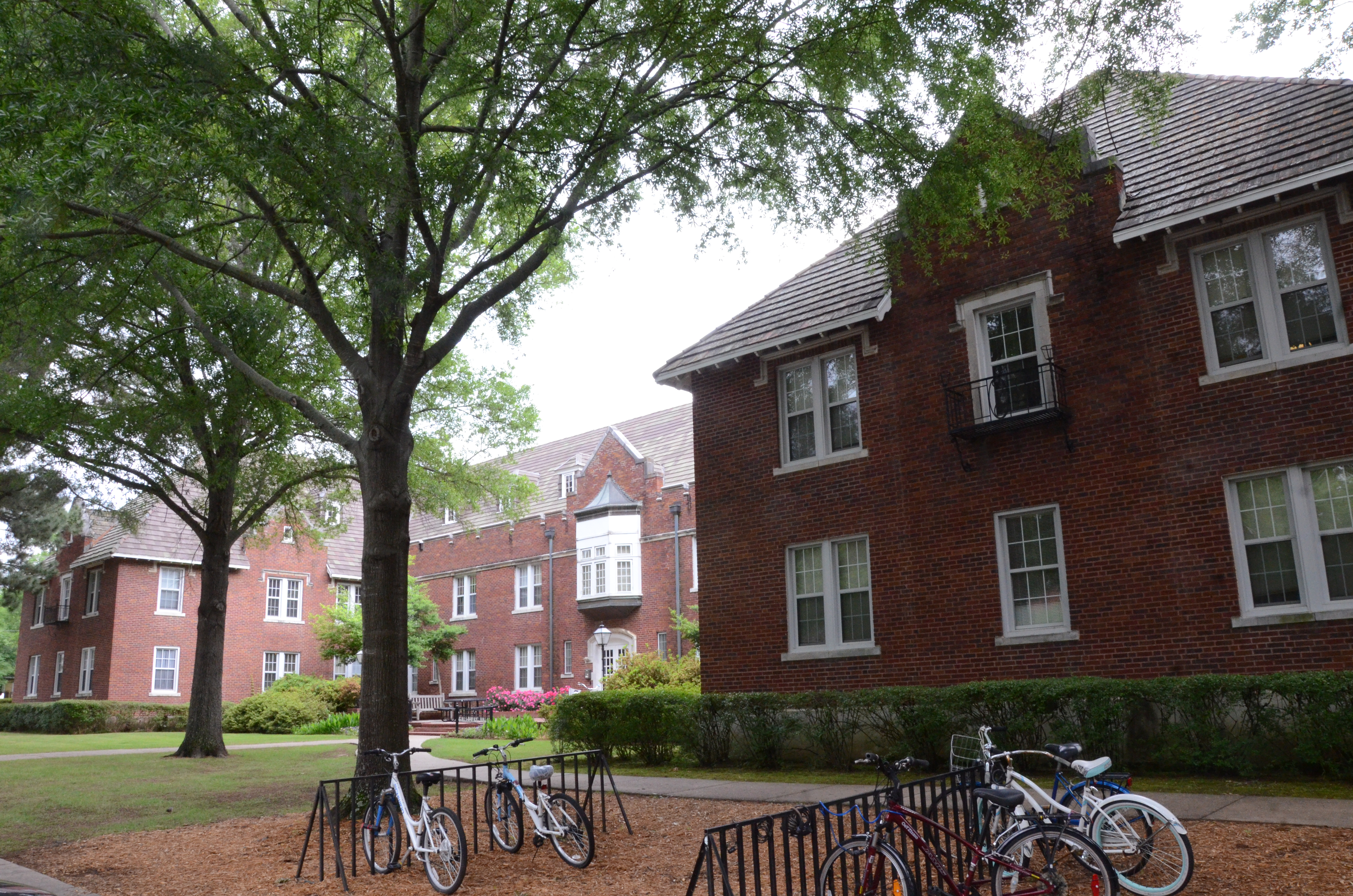

- Location within Arkansas Location within the United States
- Location: Hendrix College campus, Conway, Arkansas
- Coordinates: 35°6′6″N 92°26′28″W
- Area: less than one acre
- Built: 1913
- Architect: Charles L. Thompson
- Architectural style: Tudor Revival
- MPS: Thompson, Charles L., Design Collection TR
- NRHP reference No.: 82000953
- Added to NRHP: December 22, 1982

Galloway Hall is a residence hall on the campus of Hendrix College in Conway, Arkansas. It is a large Tudor Revival three story brick building, designed by architect Charles L. Thompson and built in 1913. Its central portion has a gabled roof, with end pavilions that have hip roofs with gabled dormers, and stepped parapet gables, with limestone trim. It is the oldest dormitory building on the campus. It was named to honor Bishop Charles Betts Galloway.

The building was listed on the U.S. National Register of Historic Places in 1982.

== See also ==
- National Register of Historic Places listings in Faulkner County, Arkansas
