= Conway Confederate Monument =

- U.S. National Register of Historic Places
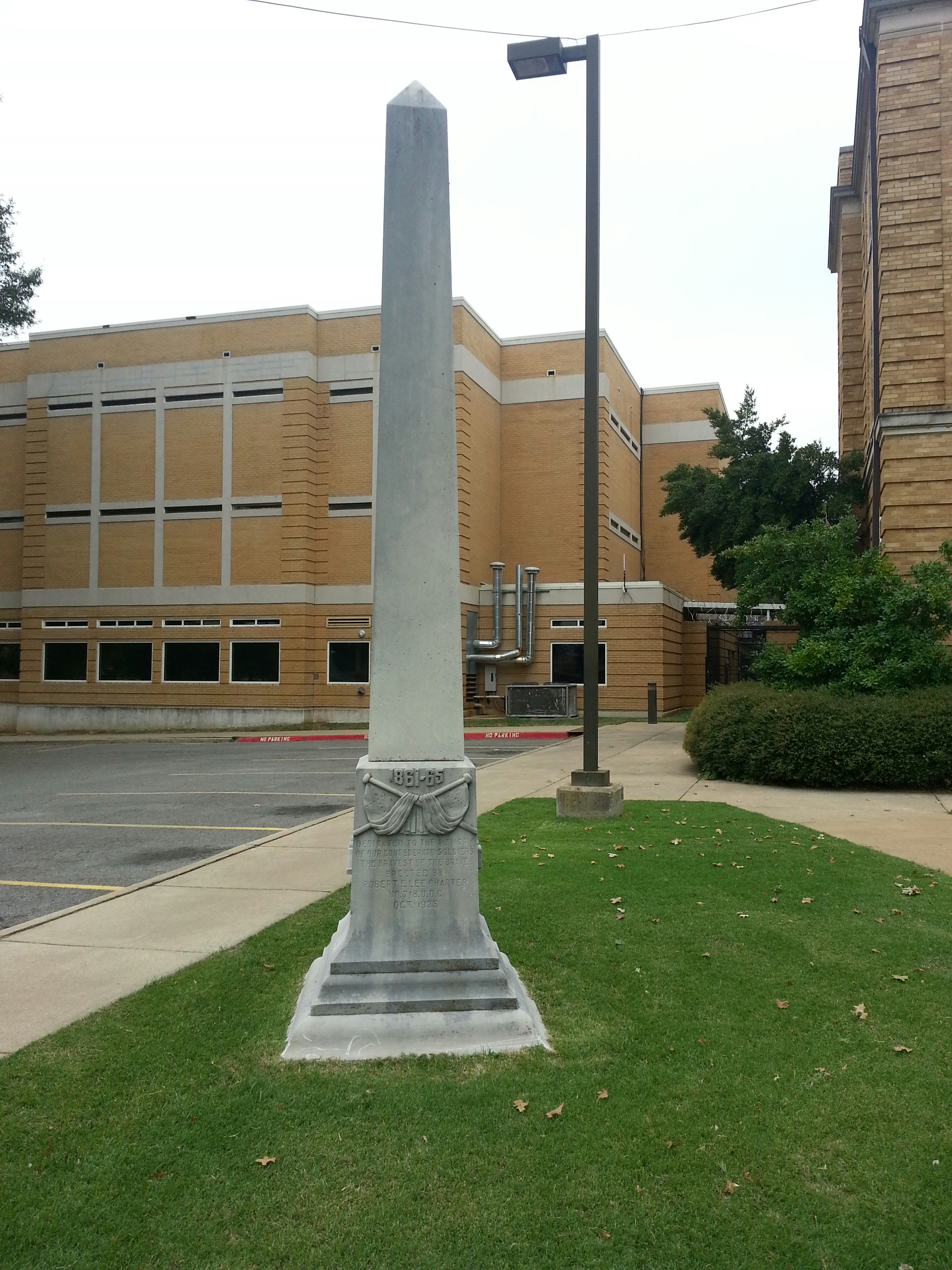

- Location within Arkansas Location within the United States
- Location: SW jct. of Courthouse Lawn, E of jct. of Robinson Ave. and Center St., Conway, Arkansas
- Coordinates: 35°5′19″N 92°26′35″W
- Area: less than one acre
- Built: 1925
- Architectural style: Classical Revival
- MPS: Civil War Commemorative Sculpture MPS
- NRHP reference No.: 96000455
- Added to NRHP: April 26, 1996

The Conway Confederate Monument stands on the lawn of the Faulkner County Courthouse, east of the junction of Robinson Avenue and Center Street in Conway, Arkansas. It is a stone obelisk, 200 inches (5.1 m) in height, with a square base 45 inches (1.1 m) on each side. The east face bears the inscription "1861-65 / (carving of crossed flags) / DEDICATED TO THE MEMORY / OF OWR CONFEDERATE SOLDIERS / THE BRAVEST OF THE BRAVE / ERECTED BY / ROBERT E. LEE CHAPTER / NO. 718 U.D.C. / OCT. 1925". The monument was funded by the local chapter of the United Daughters of the Confederacy and was dedicated in 1925.

The monument was listed on the National Register of Historic Places in 1996.

== See also ==
- National Register of Historic Places listings in Faulkner County, Arkansas
