= Patton House (Wooster, Arkansas) =

Historic house in Arkansas, United States

- U.S. National Register of Historic Places
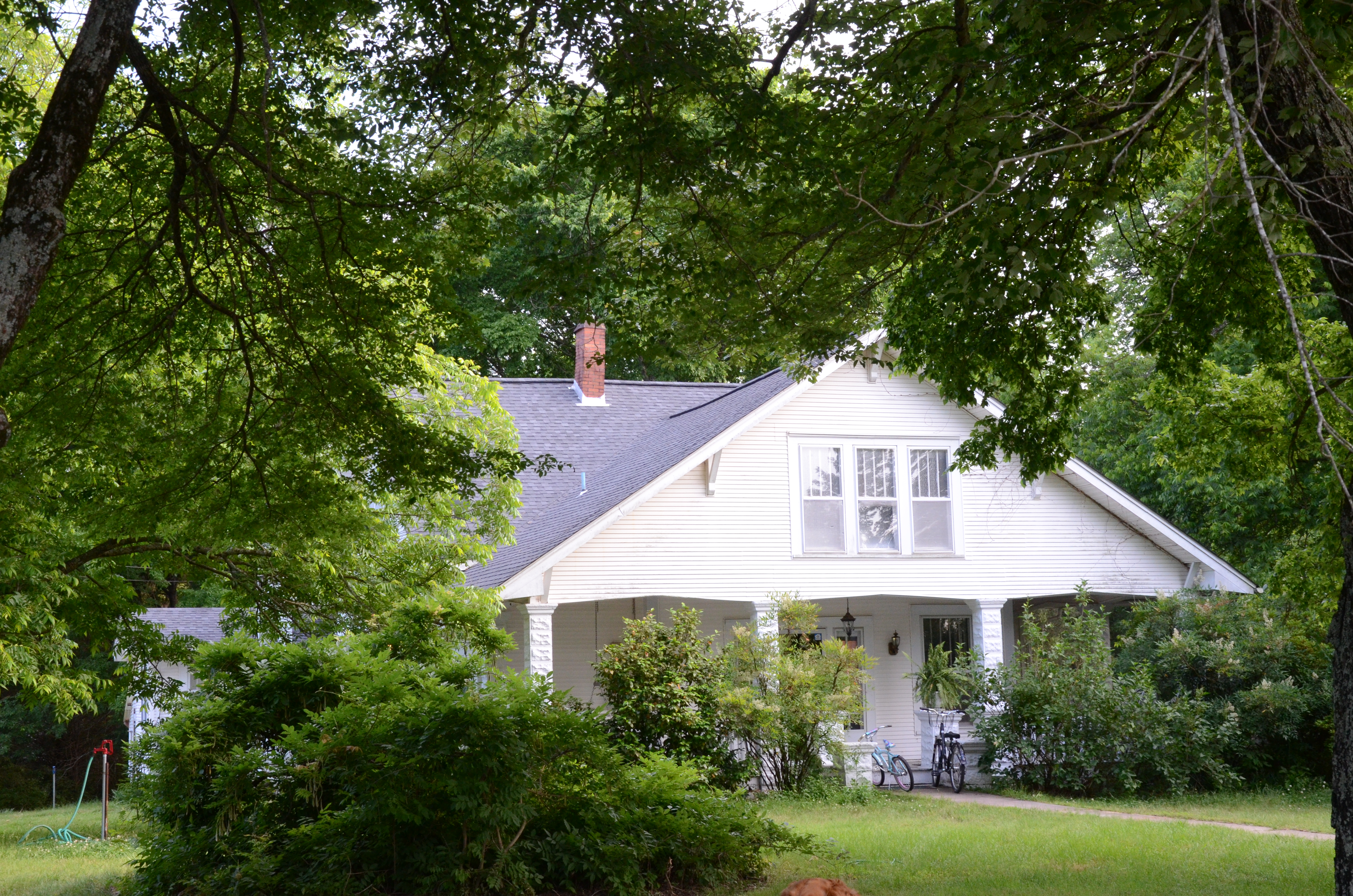

- Location within Arkansas Location within the United States
- Location: AR 25, Wooster, Arkansas
- Coordinates: 35°12′4″N 92°27′9″W
- Area: 4.4 acres (1.8 ha)
- Built: 1918
- Architect: Jim Ball
- Architectural style: Bungalow/American Craftsman
- NRHP reference No.: 93001026
- Added to NRHP: September 30, 1993

The Patton House is a historic house on the south side of Arkansas Highway 25 in Wooster, Arkansas. It is a 1 1/2-story wood-frame structure, with a cross-gable roof, weatherboard siding, and a concrete block foundation. The front-facing gable extends over a recessed porch, the gable supported by distinctive shaped concrete block columns. The interior retains original built-in cabinetry and oak trim. The house was built in 1918, and is the small community's finest example of American Craftsman architecture.

The house was listed on the National Register of Historic Places in 1993.

== See also ==
- National Register of Historic Places listings in Faulkner County, Arkansas
