= Frank U. Halter House =

Historic house in Arkansas, United States

- U.S. National Register of Historic Places
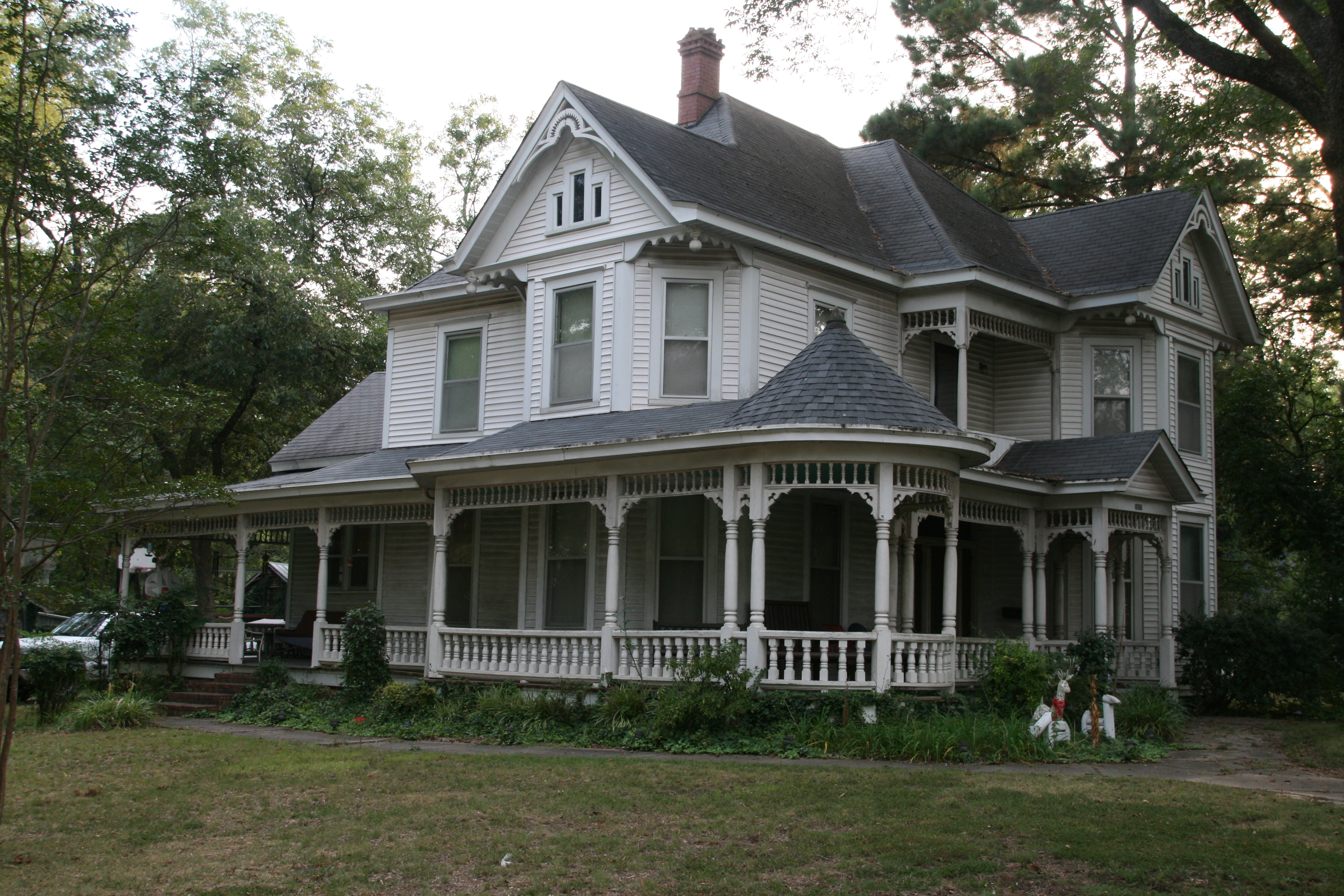

- Location within Arkansas Location within the United States
- Location: 1355 College Ave., Conway, Arkansas
- Coordinates: 35°5′3″N 92°26′26″W
- Area: less than one acre
- Built: 1905
- Architect: Frank U. Halter
- Architectural style: Queen Anne, Colonial Revival
- NRHP reference No.: 80000776
- Added to NRHP: August 29, 1980

The Frank U. Halter House is a historic house at 1355 College Avenue in Conway, Arkansas. It is a 2 1/2-story wood-frame structure, with a complex gable-and-hip roof characteristic of the Queen Anne style. Also typical of that style are its wraparound porch with spindled woodwork, a turreted corner pavilion, and bargeboard in some of the gable ends. Built in 1905, it is one of the city's finest example of Queen Anne architecture.

The house was listed on the National Register of Historic Places in 1980.

== See also ==
- National Register of Historic Places listings in Faulkner County, Arkansas
