= Martin Hall (Hendrix College) =

- U.S. National Register of Historic Places
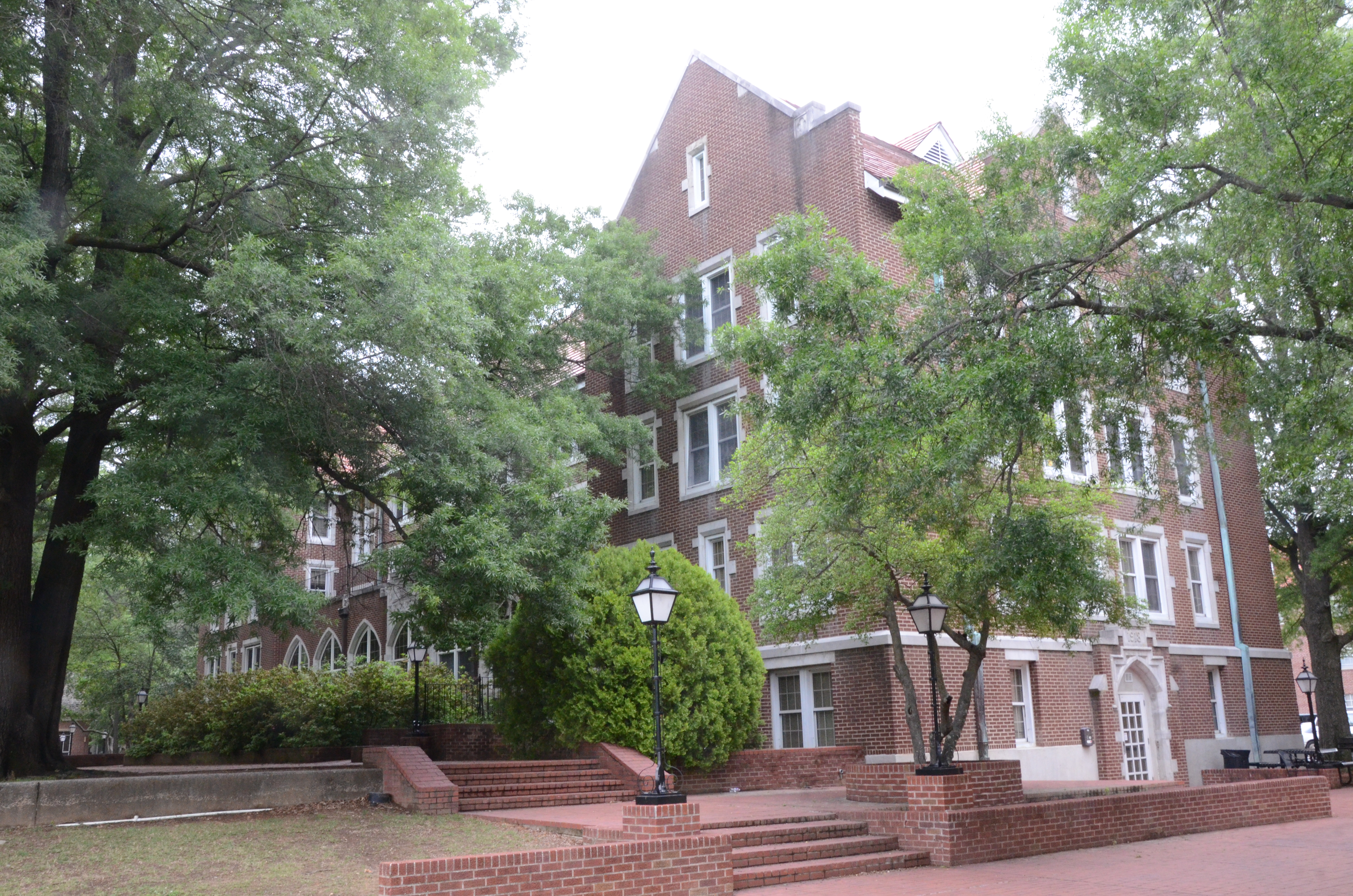

- Location within Arkansas Location within the United States
- Location: Hendrix College campus, Conway, Arkansas
- Coordinates: 35°5′58″N 92°26′28″W
- Area: less than one acre
- Built: 1918
- Architect: Thompson and Harding
- Architectural style: Late Gothic Revival, Collegiate Gothic
- MPS: Thompson, Charles L., Design Collection TR
- NRHP reference No.: 82000815
- Added to NRHP: December 22, 1982

Martin Hall is a dormitory on the campus of Hendrix College in Conway, Arkansas. It was built in 1918 to a design by noted Arkansas architect Charles L. Thompson. It is a three-story masonry structure, faced on dark red brick with stone trim elements. It has a wide central section topped by a gable roof, with projecting gabled sections at its ends. Its ground floor windows are set in arched openings giving it an arcaded appearance. The hall was listed on the National Register of Historic Places in 1982 for its architectural significance.

Martin Hall closed for renovations in August 2021, as part of Hendrix College's Residence Hall Renewal Project. Updates to the hall will include, "new HVAC systems to address air quality, humidity, and moisture concerns; new plumbing to streamline maintenance; new layouts for bathrooms to increase privacy; reconfigured laundry areas and study/lounge spaces to promote interaction among residents; ADA-compliant entries and living arrangements; LED lighting upgrades; stronger wireless connectivity; and new doors and flooring throughout both buildings."

The dorm reopened for student use in August of 2022. It has space for 123 men with a mix of single, double and triple occupancy rooms.

== See also ==
- National Register of Historic Places listings in Faulkner County, Arkansas
