= Frank E. Robins House =

Historic house in Arkansas, United States

- U.S. National Register of Historic Places
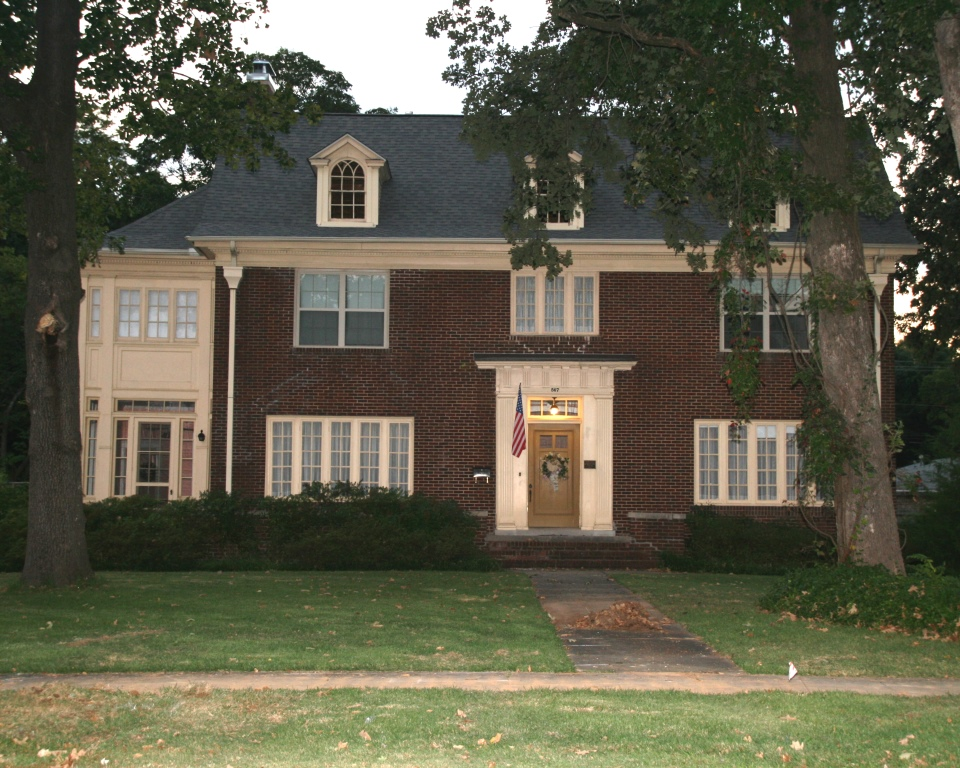

- Location within Arkansas Location within the United States
- Location: 567 Locust St., Conway, Arkansas
- Coordinates: 35°5′9″N 92°26′29″W
- Area: less than one acre
- Built: 1922
- Architectural style: Colonial Revival
- NRHP reference No.: 94000497
- Added to NRHP: May 20, 1994

The Frank E. Robins House is a historic house at 567 Locust Street in Conway, Arkansas, United States. It is a 2 1/2-story wood-frame structure, most of its exterior finished in brick veneer. It has a gabled roof pierced by gabled dormers, and an enclosed two-story porch extending to the left. The front entrance is framed by pilasters and topped by an entablature and deep cornice with supporting brackets. The house was built in 1922 for a prominent local newspaper publisher who also served as Conway's mayor.

The house was listed on the National Register of Historic Places in 1994.

== See also ==
- National Register of Historic Places listings in Faulkner County, Arkansas
