= Dennis and Christine Garrison House =

Historic house in Arkansas, United States

- U.S. National Register of Historic Places
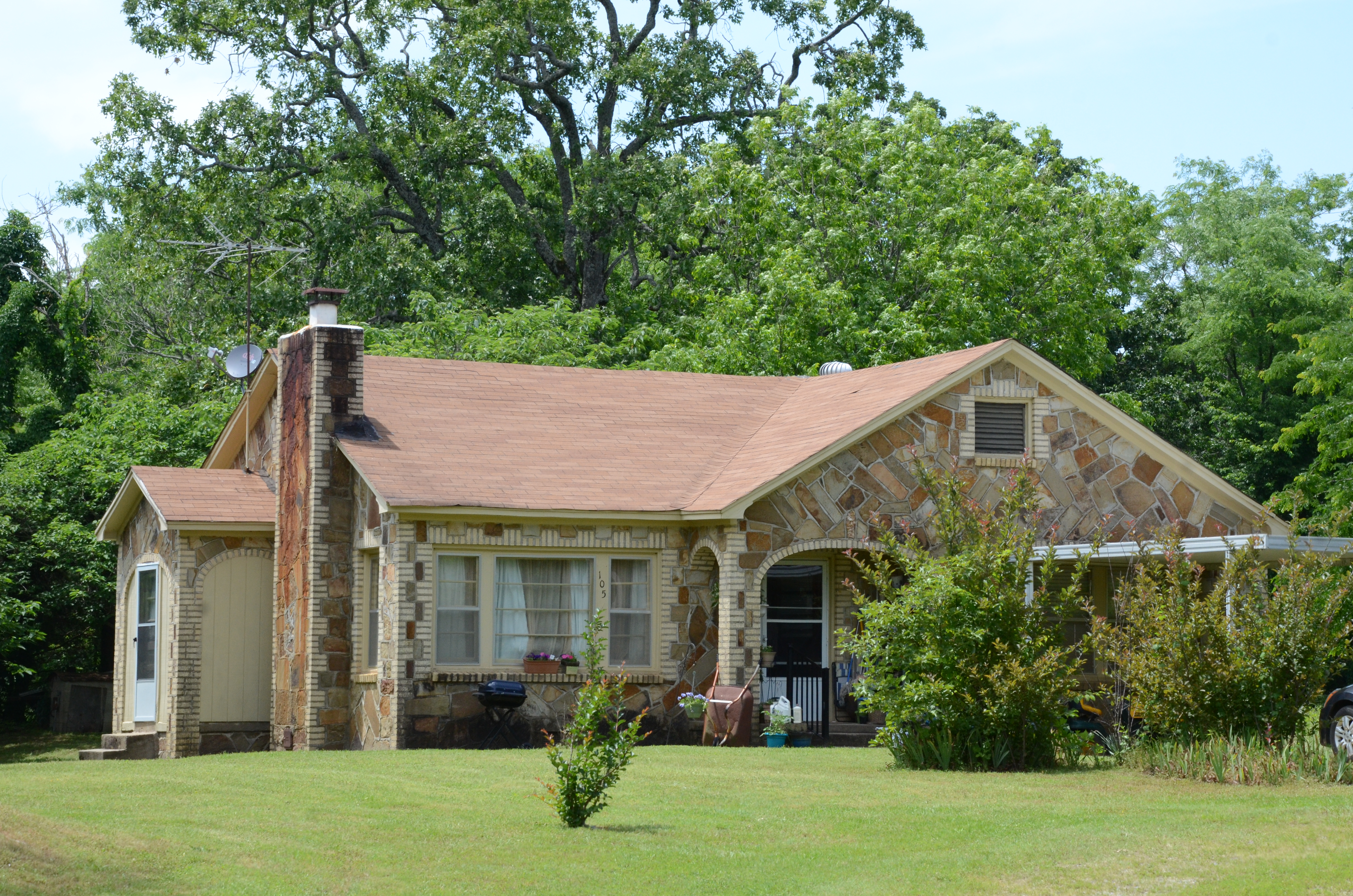

- Location within Arkansas Location within the United States
- Location: 105 Garrison Rd., Greenbrier, Arkansas
- Coordinates: 35°14′25″N 92°27′03″W
- Area: less than one acre
- Built: 1951
- Built by: Silas Owens Sr. (stonemason)
- Architectural style: Bungalow/American craftsman
- MPS: Mixed Masonry Buildings of Silas Owens, Sr. MPS
- NRHP reference No.: 05001070
- Added to NRHP: September 29, 2005

The Dennis and Christine Garrison House is a historic house at 105 Garrison Road in Greenbrier, Arkansas. It is a single story frame structure, finished in a veneer of stone and brick in 1951 by Silas Owens Sr., a local master mason. The house has a number of hallmarks of Owens' work, including cream brick trim around the building corners and the openings of doors and windows, and an arched entrance porch. The herringbone patterns in the stonework are also an Owens signature. The chimney, with similar styling, was added by Owens' son Silas Jr.

The house was listed on the National Register of Historic Places in 2005.

== See also ==
- National Register of Historic Places listings in Faulkner County, Arkansas
