= Cadron Settlement Park =

Archaeological site in Arkansas, United States

- U.S. National Register of Historic Places
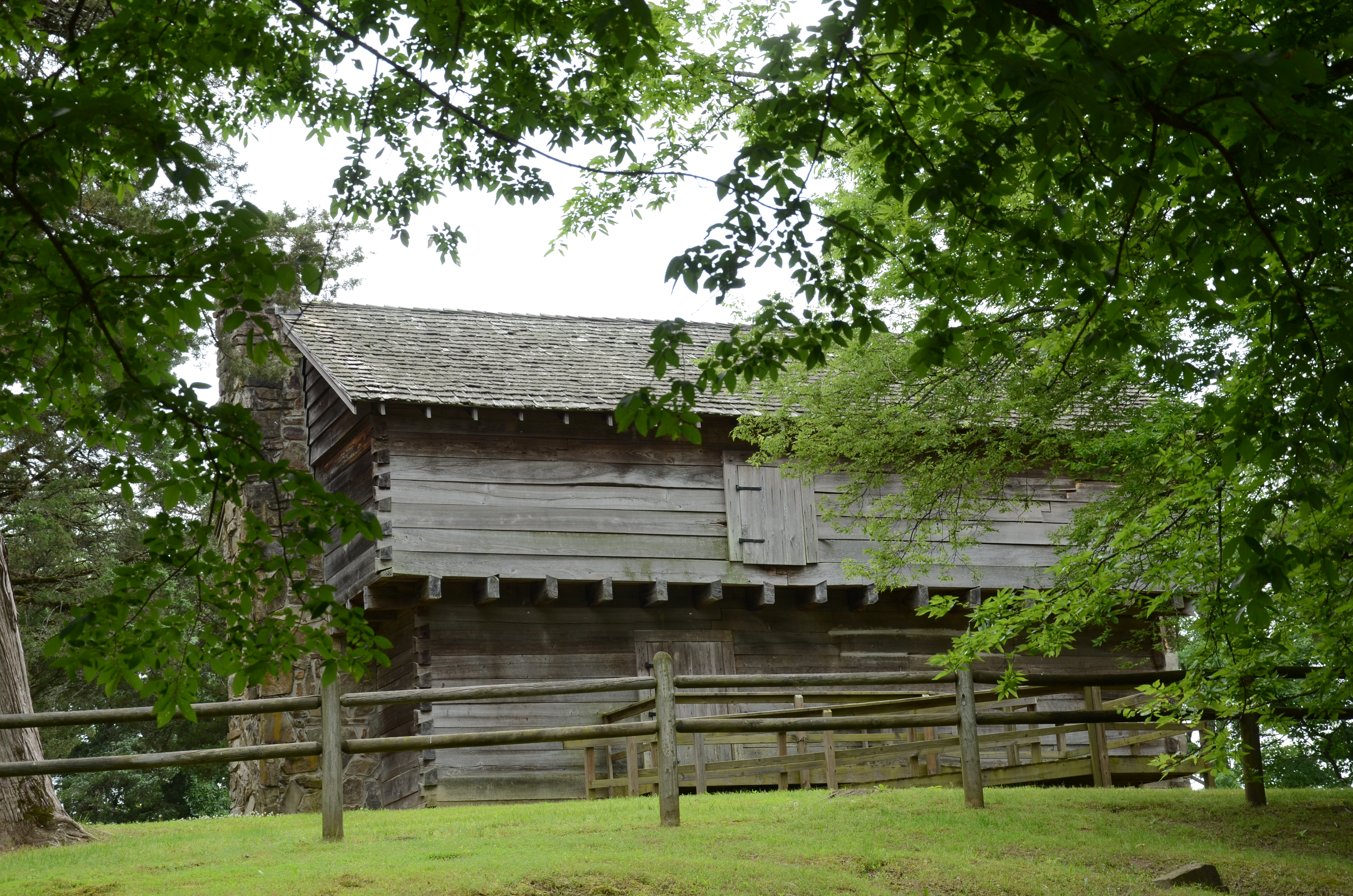
- Cadron Settlement Park in 2016

- Location within Arkansas Location within the United States
- Location: Conway, Arkansas
- Coordinates: 35°6′26″N 92°32′44″W
- Area: 150 acres (61 ha)
- NRHP reference No.: 74000475
- Added to NRHP: May 17, 1974

Cadron Settlement Park (archaically Cadron) is a 150-acre (61 ha) public park located in Conway, Arkansas. It is operated by the city of Conway under a lease from the Corps of Engineers. The public park was established on October 14, 1979, and features a reconstructed blockhouse, boat launch, hiking trails, restrooms, picnic areas, pavilion, handicapped trails and parking areas, and interpretive signs. The Faulkner County Historical Society hosts public events in the blockhouse.

== History ==
Between 700 and 800 Native Americans stopped here during their removal to Indian Territory in a movement known as the Trail of Tears. They were from several different tribes including Cherokee, Muscogee (Creek), Choctaw, Chickasaw, and Seminole. An early group of Cherokee were stranded here for approximately 16 days when they were hit with an outbreak of cholera. Led by Lieutenant Joseph Whipple Harris, also stricken with cholera, the group buried their dead and continued by land. Lt. Harris recorded in his journal that 81 people died before the end of their journey. In 1991, the Faulkner County Historical Society identified 44 Native American graves, and 36 more graves that could not be definitively identified as Native American.

== See also ==
- Butterfield Overland Mail in Arkansas and Missouri
- National Register of Historic Places listings in Faulkner County, Arkansas
