= Military Road-Cadron Segment =

- U.S. National Register of Historic Places
- Nearest city: Conway, Arkansas
- Area: less than one acre
- MPS: Cherokee Trail of Tears MPS
- NRHP reference No.: 03001490
- Added to NRHP: January 28, 2004

The Military Road-Cadron Segment is a portion of 19th-century roadway in Faulkner County, Arkansas, near the city of Conway. It consists of an original section of a military road built in the mid-1830s between Little Rock and the military outpost at Fort Smith, through what was then frontier territory. It is one of the only known surviving sections of the early military roads that crossed the Arkansas Territory, which is located west of Little Rock. The road is further notable as one of the routes by which Native Americans were relocated to Indian Territory (now Oklahoma) from points east of the Mississippi River.

The road section was listed on the National Register of Historic Places in 2004.

== See also ==
- National Register of Historic Places listings in Faulkner County, Arkansas
