= Faulkner County Museum =

- Faulkner County Jail
- U.S. National Register of Historic Places
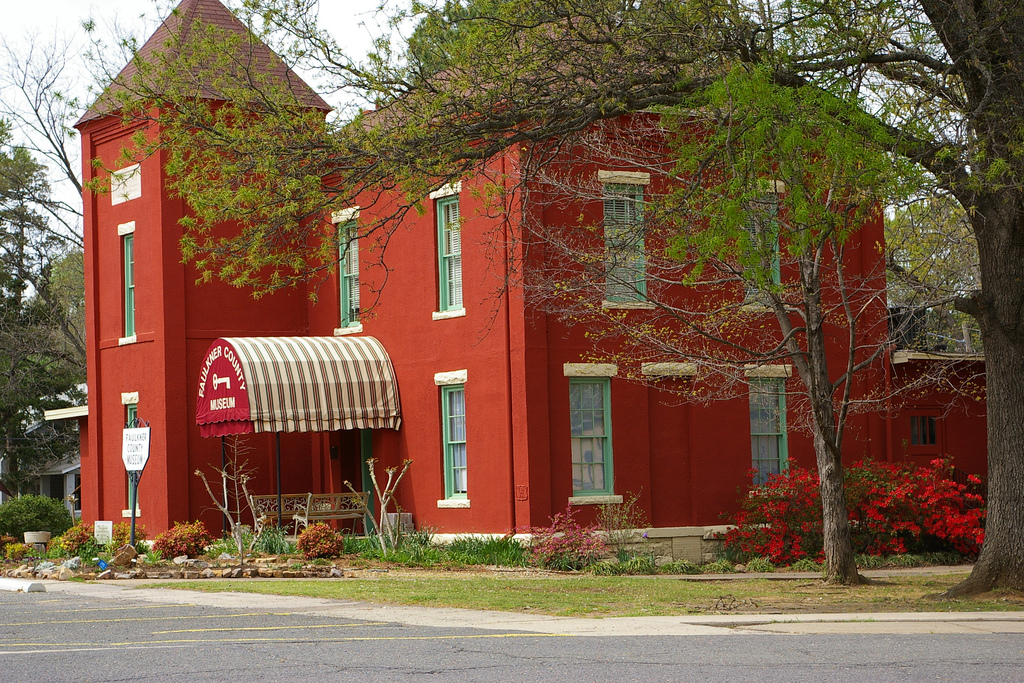

- Location within Arkansas Location within the United States
- Location: Courthouse Sq., Conway, Arkansas
- Coordinates: 35°5′21″N 92°26′37″W
- Area: less than one acre
- Built: 1896
- Architect: A.N. Miller
- NRHP reference No.: 78000585
- Added to NRHP: July 20, 1978

The Faulkner County Museum is located in the former Faulkner County Jail, on Courthouse Square in the center of Conway, the county seat of Faulkner County, Arkansas. It is a two-story masonry structure, built out of stone and brick with a stuccoed finish. A three-story square tower projects from one corner, topped by a pyramidal roof. It was built in 1895, and converted to the county library in 1934. It housed that library until 1995, after which it was converted into the county museum.

Founded in 1992 and opened in 1997, the museum focuses on the prehistory, history and culture of Faulkner County. Displays include photos, historic artifacts and equipment, household items, clothing, and art and crafts by area artists. The museum also houses area history and archival collections.

The building was listed on the National Register of Historic Places in 1978.

== See also ==
- National Register of Historic Places listings in Faulkner County, Arkansas
