= Church of Christ (Guy, Arkansas) =

Historic church in Arkansas, United States

- U.S. National Register of Historic Places
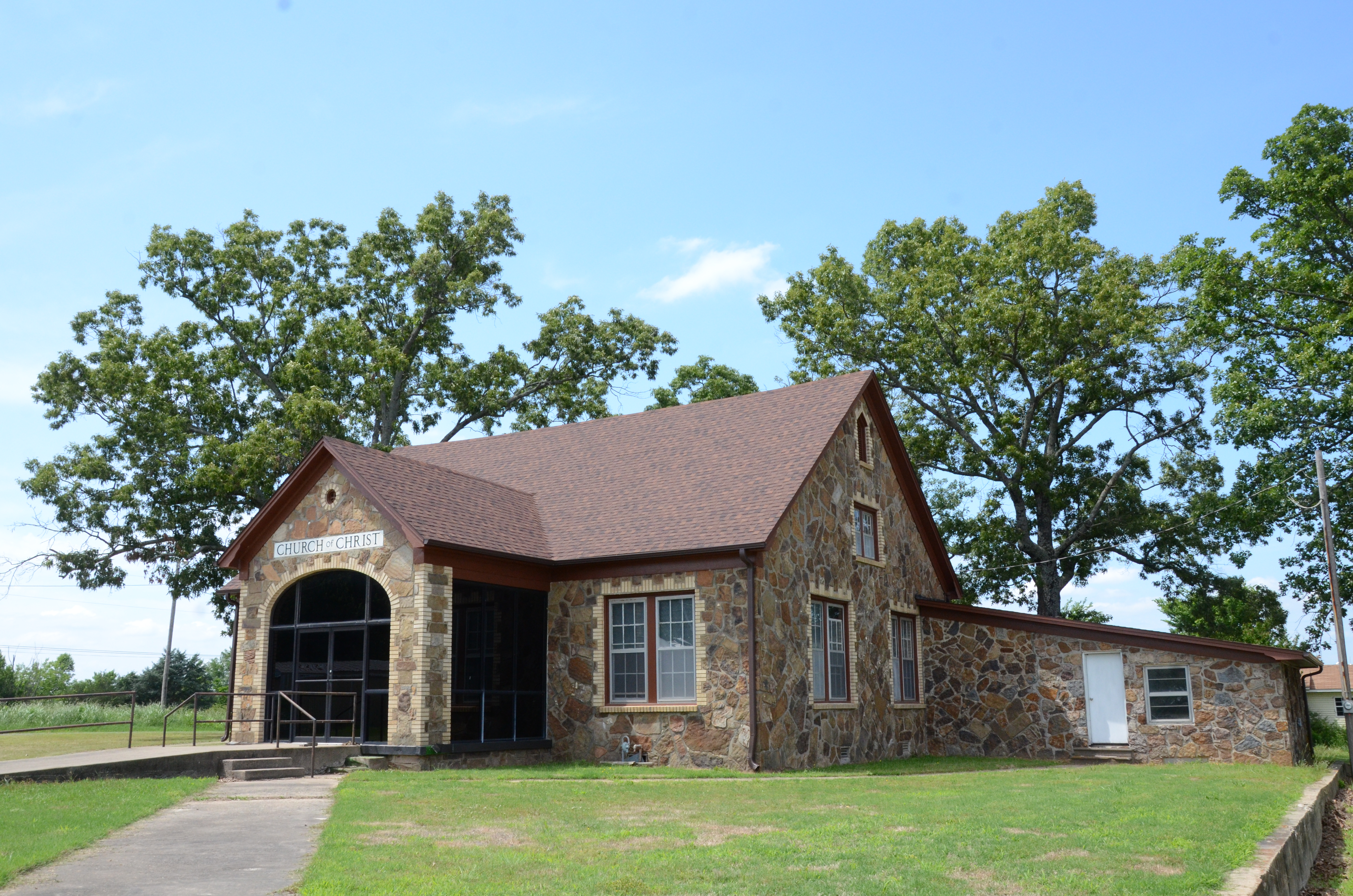
- Church of Christ, May 2015

- Location within Arkansas Location within the United States
- Location: Guy, Arkansas; United States
- Coordinates: 35°19′33″N 92°20′7″W
- Built: 1936
- Architect: Owens, Silas
- Architectural style: Bungalow/Craftsman
- MPS: Mixed Masonry Buildings of Silas Owens, Sr. MPS
- NRHP reference No.: 05000040
- Added to NRHP: February 15, 2005

The Church of Christ is a historic church building in central Guy, Arkansas, United States, that is listed on the National Register of Historic Places.

== Description ==
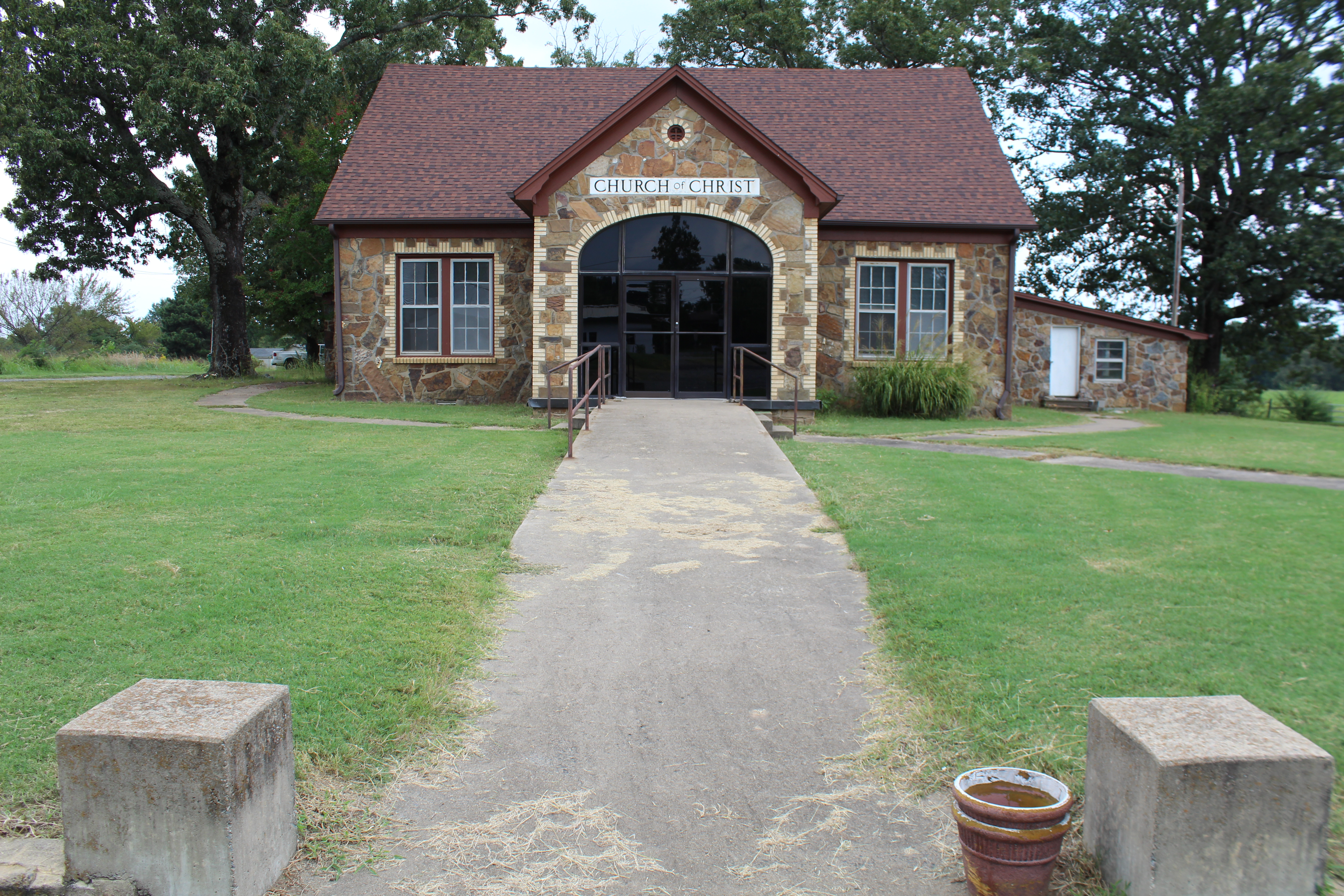
Front view of the Church of Christ in Guy, Arkansas, September 2018

The church is located just northwest of the junction Arkansas Highway 310 and Arkansas Highway 25. It is a single story cruciform structure, built of brick and stone in the Craftsman style. It was built in 1936-37 by Silas Owens, a local master mason, and is Guy's finest stone church. It is a gabled vestibule with the entrance recessed in a round-arch opening that has been enclosed in glass. Door and window openings are quoined in light brick, contrasting with earth-toned stone of the walls.

The congregation is associated with the Churches of Christ. It was listed on the National Register of Historic Places on February 15, 2005.

== See also ==
- National Register of Historic Places listings in Faulkner County, Arkansas
