= Oak Grove Cemetery (Conway, Arkansas) =

Historic cemetery in Arkansas, United States

- Oak Grove Cemetery Historic Section
- U.S. National Register of Historic Places
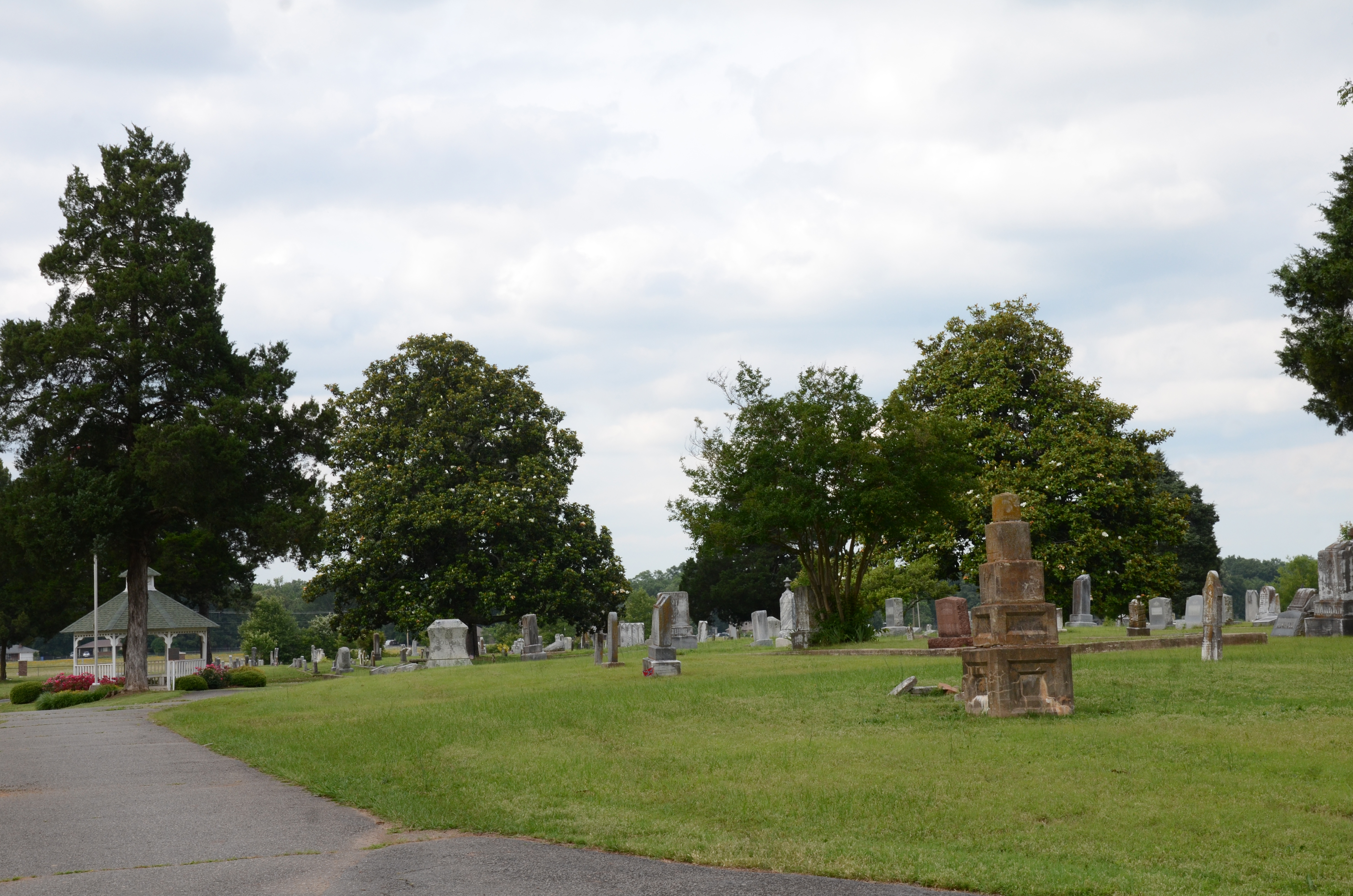

- Location within Arkansas Location within the United States
- Location: E. Bruce St., approx. .3 mi. E. of the jct of Harkrider St., Conway, Arkansas
- Coordinates: 35°4′54″N 92°25′43″W
- Area: 3.5 acres (1.4 ha)
- Built: 1881
- Architect: F.L. Funston, Monahan and Visquesney/Steinert
- NRHP reference No.: 09000341
- Added to NRHP: November 4, 2009

Oak Grove Cemetery is the oldest cemetery of the city of Conway, Arkansas. It was established in 1880, five years after the town was incorporated and nine after its first settlement. The cemetery is in active use, with more than 3,000 burials. Among the interred are many of the city's earliest and most prominent citizens.

The historic portion of the cemetery, roughly 3.5 acres (1.4 ha) at its center, was listed on the National Register of Historic Places in 2009.

== See also ==
- National Register of Historic Places listings in Faulkner County, Arkansas
