= S.G. Smith House =

Historic house in Arkansas, United States

- S. G. Smith House
- U.S. National Register of Historic Places
- U.S. Historic district – Contributing property
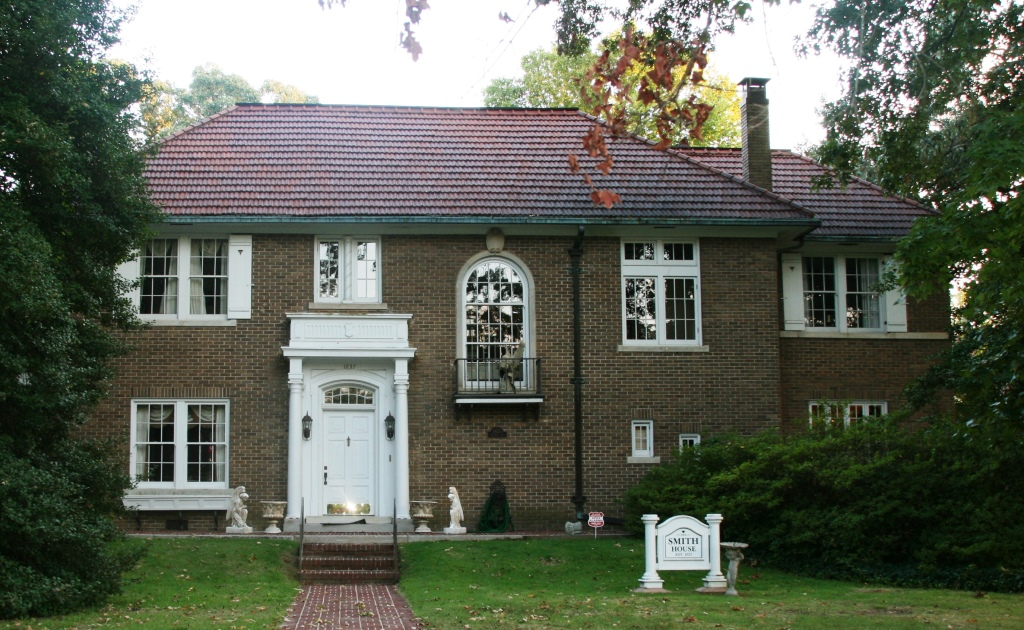

- Location within Arkansas Location within the United States
- Location: 1837 Caldwell St., Conway, Arkansas
- Coordinates: 35°5′24″N 92°27′1″W
- Area: less than one acre
- Built: 1924
- Architect: Thompson & Harding
- Architectural style: Colonial Revival
- MPS: Thompson, Charles L., Design Collection TR
- NRHP reference No.: 82000853
- Added to NRHP: December 22, 1982

The S.G. Smith House is a historic house at 1937 Caldwell Street in Conway, Arkansas. It is a two-story brick structure, with a hip roof, and a porte-cochere extending to the west, supported by Tuscan columns. The main entrance is framed by Classical pillars supporting an entablature, and there is a round-arch window with narrow metal balcony to its right. The house was built about 1924 to a design by the Arkansas firm of Thompson and Harding.

The house was listed on the National Register of Historic Places in 1982.

== See also ==
- National Register of Historic Places listings in Faulkner County, Arkansas
