= Scull Historic District =

Historic district in Arkansas, United States

- U.S. National Register of Historic Places
- U.S. Historic district
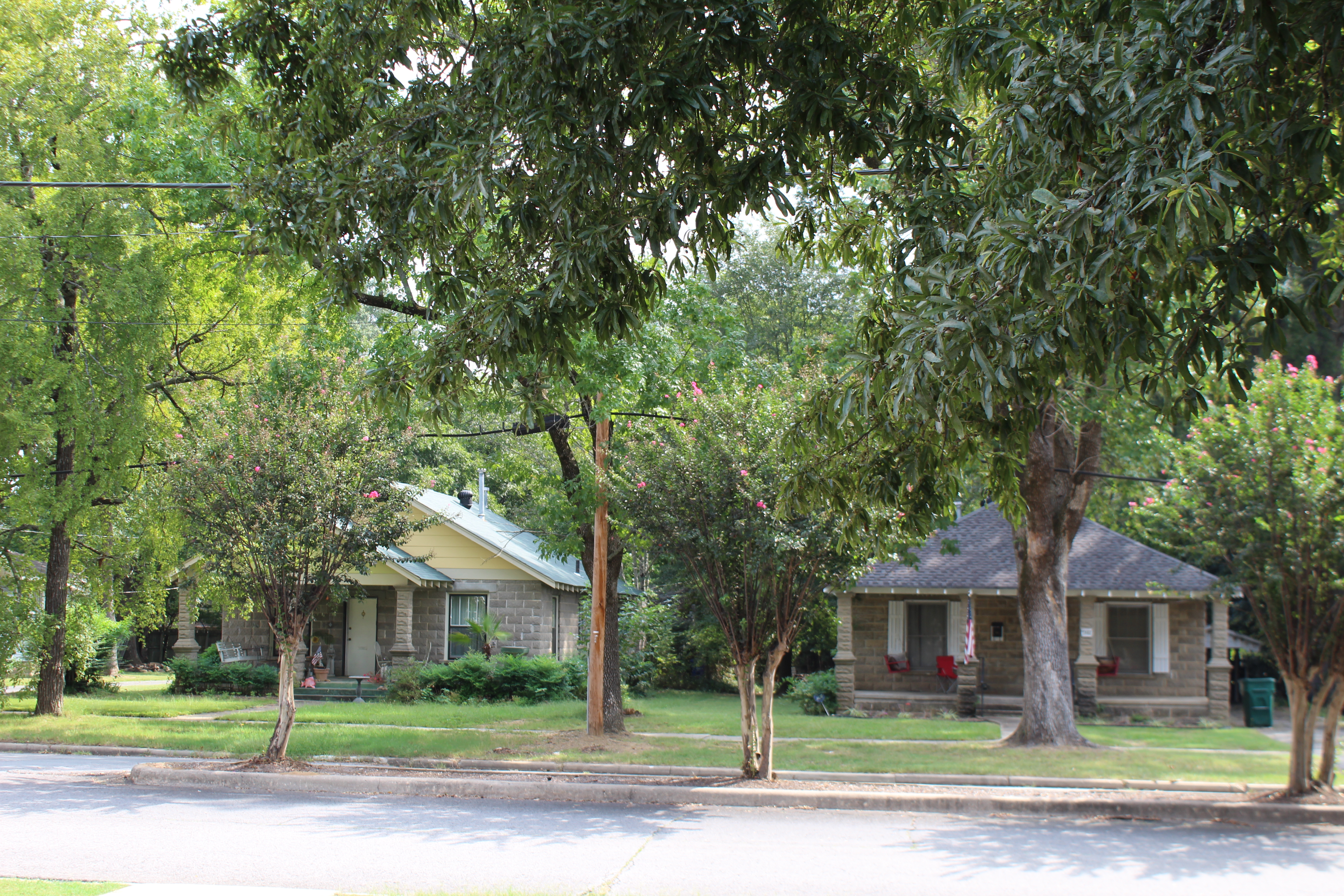

- Location within Arkansas Location within the United States
- Location: 428 & 432 Conway Blvd., Conway, Arkansas
- Coordinates: 35°5′2″N 92°26′37″W
- Area: less than one acre
- Architectural style: Craftsman
- NRHP reference No.: 100001647
- Added to NRHP: September 21, 2017

The Scull Historic District encompasses two concrete-block houses at 428 and 432 Conway Boulevard in Conway, Arkansas. These two houses were built about 1928, using a style of ornamental concrete block that were a fashionable building material during the 1920s. Both are single-story structures, with hip roofs and four-column porches recessed under the roof. The houses were probably built by Ferdinand Lawrence Scull, a local manufacturer of the ornamental blocks used in their construction.

The district was listed on the National Register of Historic Places in 2017.

== See also ==
- National Register of Historic Places listings in Faulkner County, Arkansas
