= Lasley's College Apartments =

- U.S. National Register of Historic Places
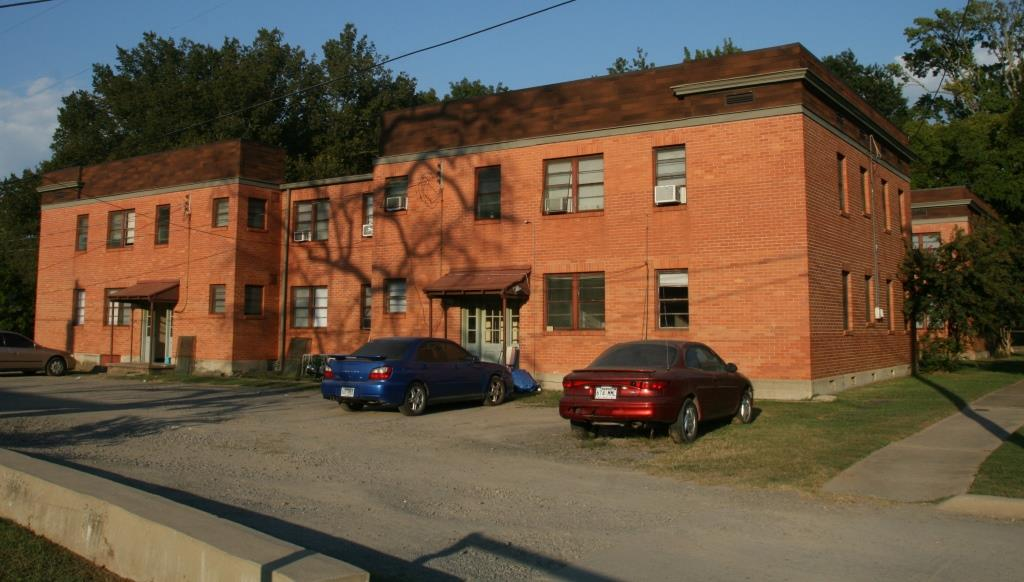
- Lasley's College Apartments in 2014

- Location within Arkansas Location within the United States
- Location: 1916 & 1922 Bruce St., Conway, Arkansas
- Coordinates: 35°4′58″N 92°27′3″W
- Area: less than one acre
- Built: 1947
- Architectural style: Plain Traditional
- NRHP reference No.: 11000300
- Added to NRHP: May 25, 2011

The Lasley's College Apartments are a historic apartment complex at 1916 and 1922 Bruce Street in Conway, Arkansas, adjacent to the campus of the University of Central Arkansas. It consists of two two-story brick buildings flanking a central courtyard. Each building has a flat roof with parapet, and houses eight residential units, four one-bedroom and four two-bedroom units in each. They were built in 1947 in response to the university's increasing demand for housing, and are a well-preserved example of period multiunit residential architecture.

The complex was listed on the National Register of Historic Places in 2011.

== See also ==
- National Register of Historic Places in Faulkner County, Arkansas
