= D.O. Harton House =

United States historic place

- D. O. Harton Jr. House
- U.S. National Register of Historic Places
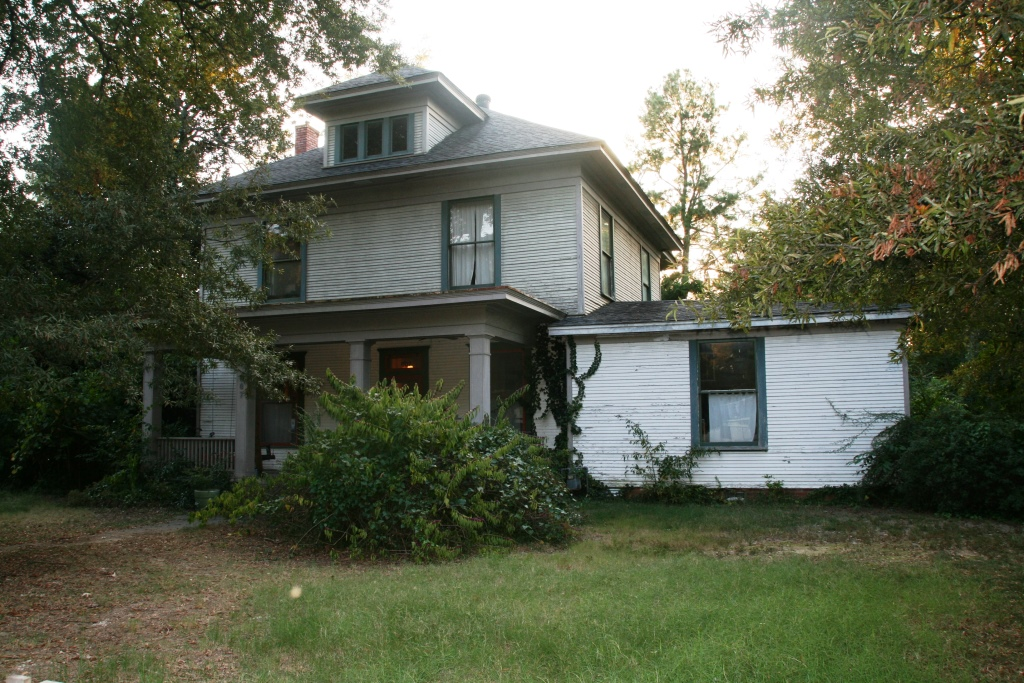

- Location within Arkansas Location within the United States
- Location: 607 Davis St., Conway, Arkansas
- Coordinates: 35°5′11″N 92°26′53″W
- Area: less than one acre
- Built: 1913
- Architect: Daniel Osbon Harton
- Architectural style: American foursqare
- NRHP reference No.: 96000796
- Added to NRHP: July 19, 1996

The D.O. Harton House is a historic house at 607 Davis Street in Conway, Arkansas. It is a 2 1/2-story wood-frame structure, with a hip roof, weatherboard siding, and a brick foundation. A hip-roof dormer projects from the front of the roof, and a single-story porch extends across the front, supported by wooden box columns with Classical detailing. Built in 1913, it is a well-kept example of a vernacular American Foursquare house, built by D.O. Harton, Jr., a local contractor.

The house was listed on the National Register of Historic Places in 1996.

== See also ==
- National Register of Historic Places listings in Faulkner County, Arkansas
