= Michael M. Hiegel House =

Historic house in Arkansas, United States

- U.S. National Register of Historic Places
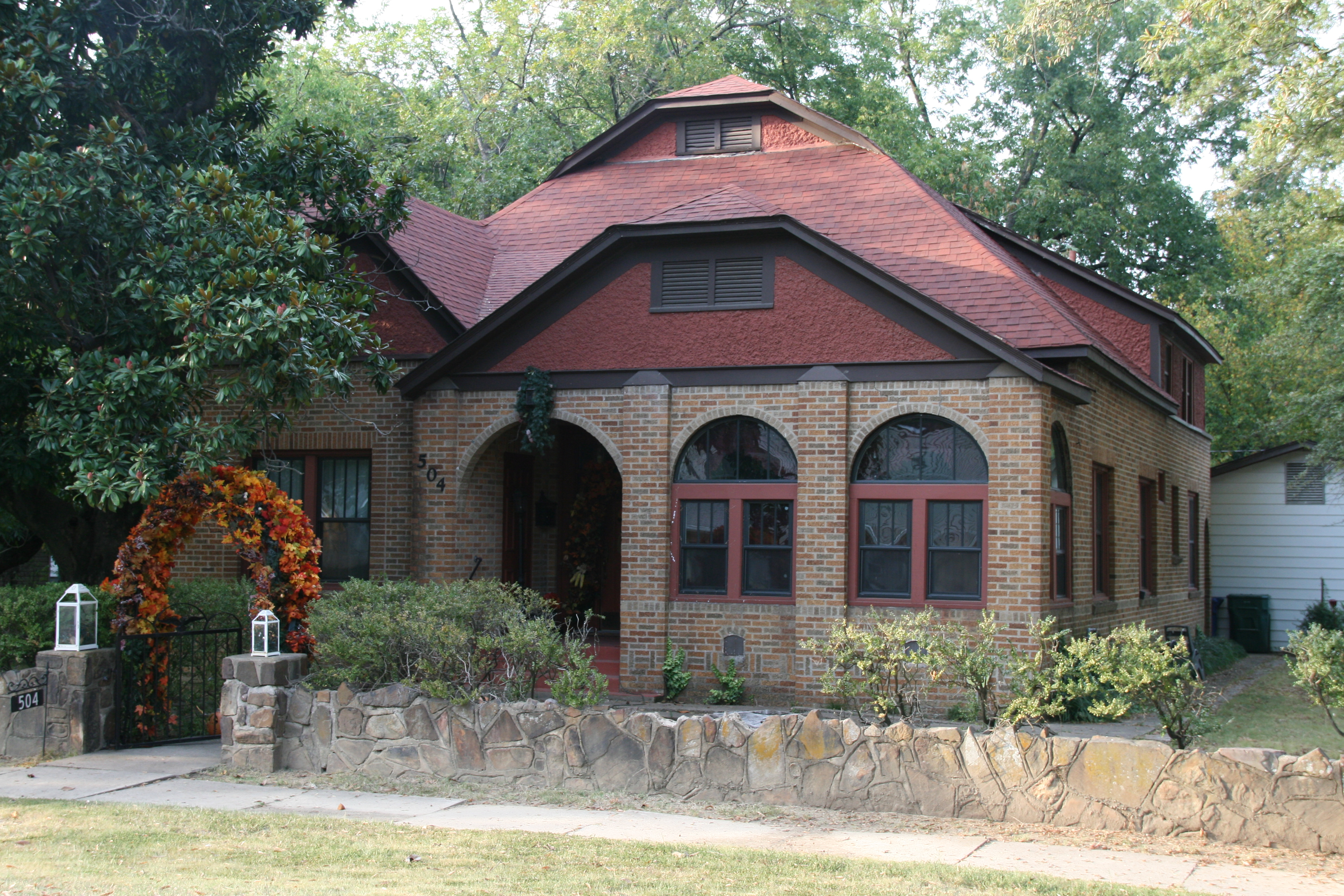

- Location within Arkansas Location within the United States
- Location: 504 Second St., Conway, Arkansas
- Coordinates: 35°5′17″N 92°25′57″W
- Area: less than one acre
- Built: 1911
- Architect: Michael M. Hiegel
- Architectural style: Bungalow/American craftsman, Tudor Revival
- NRHP reference No.: 98000912
- Added to NRHP: August 14, 1998

The Michael M. Hiegel House is a historic house at 504 Second Street in Conway, Arkansas. It is a picturesque 1 1/2-story structure, finished in brick and stucco and covered by a gable-on-hip roof. The main facade bays are articulated by brick pilasters, with the two right bays filled with round-arch windows, and the bay to their left housing the main entrance, deeply recessed under a similar rounded arch. To its left is a projecting gable-arched section with a pair of sash windows. Built about 1911, it is a high quality local example of Tudor Revival architecture. It was built by Michael Hiegel, a prominent local businessman who operated a grocery store and lumber business, and was active in local political affairs.

The house was listed on the National Register of Historic Places in 1998.

== See also ==
- National Register of Historic Places listings in Faulkner County, Arkansas
