= Ellis Hall (Hendrix College) =

Historic house in Arkansas, United States

- President's House
- U.S. National Register of Historic Places
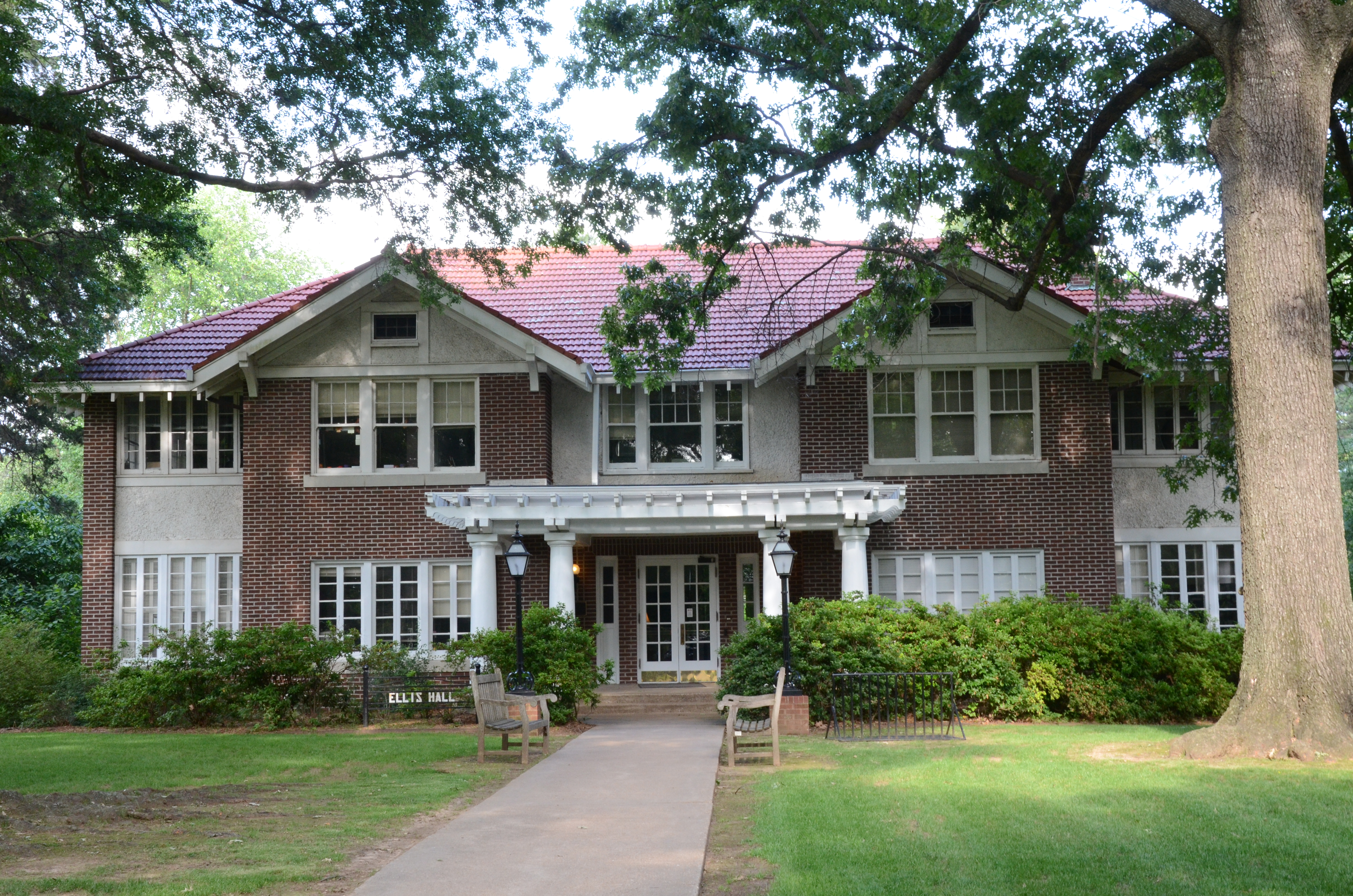

- Location within Arkansas Location within the United States
- Location: Hendrix College campus, Conway, Arkansas
- Coordinates: 35°5′53″N 92°26′32″W
- Area: less than one acre
- Built: 1913
- Architect: Charles L. Thompson
- Architectural style: Bungalow/craftsman
- MPS: Thompson, Charles L., Design Collection TR
- NRHP reference No.: 82000816
- Added to NRHP: December 22, 1982

Ellis Hall is an administration building on the campus of Hendrix College in Conway, Arkansas. It is basically a large two-story house, with Craftsman styling, built in 1913 to a design by Charles L. Thompson, who also designed several other buildings on the Hendrix campus. The building served as the college's President's House until 1980, and now houses the college's religious and philosophical studies.

The building was listed on the National Register of Historic Places in 1982.

== See also ==
- National Register of Historic Places listings in Faulkner County, Arkansas
