= Centerville, Faulkner County, Arkansas =

Centerville, Arkansas
- Unincorporated community
- Location within Arkansas Location within the United States
- Coordinates: 35°16′23″N 92°15′24″W
- Country: United States
- State: Arkansas
- County: Faulkner
- Elevation: 472 ft (144 m)
- Time zone: UTC-6 (Central (CST))
  - Summer (DST): UTC-5 (CDT)
- Area code: 501
- GNIS feature ID: 56956

Centerville is an unincorporated community in Faulkner County, Arkansas, United States. Centerville is 8 miles (13 km) east-northeast of Greenbrier.
