= Twin Groves, Arkansas =

- Town
- Location of Twin Groves in Faulkner County, Arkansas.
- Coordinates: 35°19′0″N 92°25′27″W
- Country: United States
- State: Arkansas
- County: Faulkner

Area
  - Town: 4.61 sq mi (11.93 km^{2})
  - Land: 4.61 sq mi (11.93 km^{2})
  - Water: 0 sq mi (0.00 km^{2})
- Elevation: 597 ft (182 m)

Population (2020)
  - Town: 317
  - Estimate (2025): 320 ▲
  - Density: 68.8/sq mi (26.58/km^{2})
  - Metro: 748,031
- Time zone: UTC-6 (Central (CST))
  - Summer (DST): UTC-5 (CDT)
- ZIP code: 72039
- Area code: 501
- FIPS code: 05-70540
- GNIS feature ID: 2406770

Twin Groves is a town in northwestern Faulkner County, Arkansas, United States. The name of the town comes from two neighboring communities — Solomon Grove and Zion Grove — which joined to incorporate as a town in 1991. As of the 2020 census, Twin Groves had a population of 317. Twin Groves is part of the Central Arkansas region.

== Geography ==
Twin Groves follows the crest of Batesville Mountain, a low ridge that rises 300 feet (91 m) above Cadron Creek to the south. U.S. Route 65 passes through the eastern (Zion Grove) side of the town, leading south 18 miles (29 km) to Conway, the county seat, and north 21 miles (34 km) to Clinton.

According to the United States Census Bureau, the town of Twin Groves has a total area of 4.6 square miles (11.8 km^{2}), all land.

== Demographics ==
Historical population
Census	Pop.	Note	%±
2000	276		—
2010	335		21.4%
2020	317		−5.4%
2025 (est.)	320	▲	0.9%
U.S. Decennial Census

=== 2020 Census ===
Twin Groves, Arkansas – Racial and ethnic composition Note: the US Census treats Hispanic/Latino as an ethnic category. This table excludes Latinos from the racial categories and assigns them to a separate category. Hispanics/Latinos may be of any race.
Race / Ethnicity (NH = Non-Hispanic)	Pop 2000	Pop 2010	Pop 2020	% 2000	% 2010	% 2020
White alone (NH)	73	138	140	26.45%	41.19%	44.16%
Black or African American alone (NH)	199	185	148	72.10%	55.22%	46.69%
Native American or Alaska Native alone (NH)	0	5	2	0.00%	1.49%	0.63%
Asian alone (NH)	0	0	0	0.00%	0.00%	0.00%
Pacific Islander alone (NH)	0	0	0	0.00%	0.00%	0.00%
Some Other Race alone (NH)	0	0	0	0.00%	0.00%	0.00%
Mixed Race or Multi-Racial (NH)	3	5	24	1.09%	1.49%	7.57%
Hispanic or Latino (any race)	1	2	3	0.36%	0.60%	0.95%
Total	276	335	317	100.00%	100.00%	100.00%

As of the census of 2000, there were 276 people, 103 households, and 74 families residing in the town. The population density was 22.7/km^{2} (58.8/mi^{2}). There were 113 housing units at an average density of 9.3/km^{2} (24.1/mi^{2}). The racial makeup of the town was 26.81% White, 72.10% Black or African American, and 1.09% from two or more races. 0.36% of the population were Hispanic or Latino of any race.

There were 103 households, out of which 27.2% had children under the age of 18 living with them, 58.3% were married couples living together, 9.7% had a female householder with no husband present, and 27.2% were non-families. 25.2% of all households were made up of individuals, and 7.8% had someone living alone who was 65 years of age or older. The average household size was 2.68 and the average family size was 3.21.

In the town, the population was spread out, with 22.5% under the age of 18, 8.0% from 18 to 24, 24.6% from 25 to 44, 27.5% from 45 to 64, and 17.4% who were 65 years of age or older. The median age was 41 years. For every 100 females, there were 107.5 males. For every 100 females age 18 and over, there were 103.8 males.

The median income for a household in the town was $34,375, and the median income for a family was $37,222. Males had a median income of $28,929 versus $16,250 for females. The per capita income for the town was $16,811. None of the families and 3.3% of the population were living below the poverty line, including no under eighteens and 8.5% of those over 64.

== Education ==
Public education for elementary and secondary school students is available from the Guy–Perkins School District, which covers the vast majority of the area. From 1879 until consolidation with Guy-Perkins in 1949, Solomon Grove operated a separate school district including three black schools, whose students then attended classes in Conway until integration of Guy–Perkins High School in 1964 and Guy-Perkins Elementary School in 1966.

Small sections extend into the South Side School District and the Greenbrier School District.
