= National Register of Historic Places listings in Van Buren County, Arkansas =

Location of Van Buren County in Arkansas

This is a list of the National Register of Historic Places listings in Van Buren County, Arkansas.

This is intended to be a complete list of the properties and districts on the National Register of Historic Places in Van Buren County, Arkansas, United States. The locations of National Register properties and districts for which the latitude and longitude coordinates are included below, may be seen in a map.

There are 17 properties and districts listed on the National Register in the county.

Contents: Counties in Arkansas
- Arkansas
- Ashley
- Baxter
- Benton
- Boone
- Bradley
- Calhoun
- Carroll
- Chicot
- Clark
- Clay
- Cleburne
- Cleveland
- Columbia
- Conway
- Craighead
- Crawford
- Crittenden
- Cross
- Dallas
- Desha
- Drew
- Faulkner
- Franklin
- Fulton
- Garland
- Grant
- Greene
- Hempstead
- Hot Spring
- Howard
- Independence
- Izard
- Jackson
- Jefferson
- Johnson
- Lafayette
- Lawrence
- Lee
- Lincoln
- Little River
- Logan
- Lonoke
- Madison
- Marion
- Miller
- Mississippi
- Monroe
- Montgomery
- Nevada
- Newton
- Ouachita
- Perry
- Phillips
- Pike
- Poinsett
- Polk
- Pope
- Prairie
- Pulaski (Little Rock)
- Randolph
- St. Francis
- Saline
- Scott
- Searcy
- Sebastian
- Sevier
- Sharp
- Stone
- Union
- Van Buren
- Washington
- White
- Woodruff
- Yell

This National Park Service list is complete through NPS recent listings posted December 19, 2025.

== Current listings ==
	Name on the Register	Image	Date listed	Location	City or town	Description
1	Melvin Chrisco House	Melvin Chrisco House	September 28, 2005 (#05001082)	237 Alvin Brown Rd. 35°22′13″N 92°25′22″W	Damascus	
2	Clinton Commercial Historic District	Clinton Commercial Historic District	May 15, 2006 (#06000410)	Roughly bounded by Town Branch Creek and by U.S. Highway 65B; 35°35′43″N 92°27′31″W	Clinton	
3	Collums-Baker House	Collums-Baker House	November 24, 1992 (#92001282)	Eastern side of U.S. Highway 65, approximately ½ mile south of the community 35°26′38″N 92°23′21″W	Bee Branch	
4	Damascus CCC Camp, Co. No. 3781 Historic District	Damascus CCC Camp, Co. No. 3781 Historic District	December 31, 2002 (#02001631)	Camp Hill Rd. 35°22′19″N 92°23′32″W	Damascus	
5	Damascus Gymnasium	Damascus Gymnasium	September 4, 1992 (#92001122)	Highway 285; 35°22′03″N 92°24′36″W	Damascus	
6	Edgemont Shelter		May 4, 1982 (#82002146)	Address Restricted	Shirley	
7	Joclin-Bradley-Bowling House	Joclin-Bradley-Bowling House	February 1, 2007 (#06001316)	160 Highway 95, W. 35°35′49″N 92°27′46″W	Clinton	
8	Carl and Esther Lee House	Carl and Esther Lee House	October 19, 2005 (#05001170)	17493 U.S. Highway 65 South; 35°22′02″N 92°24′29″W	Damascus	
9	Lynn Creek Shelter		March 21, 1978 (#78000634)	Address Restricted	Fairfield Bay	
10	Middle Fork of the Little Red River Bridge	Middle Fork of the Little Red River Bridge	January 21, 2010 (#09001260)	County Road 125 over the Middle Fork of the Little Red River; 35°39′34″N 92°19′20″W	Shirley	
11	Walter Patterson Filling Station	Walter Patterson Filling Station	February 9, 2001 (#01000074)	U.S. Highway 65 between Griggs and Court Sts. 35°35′29″N 92°27′26″W	Clinton	
12	Walter Patterson House	Walter Patterson House	June 5, 2007 (#07000504)	1800 U.S. Highway 65 North; 35°36′42″N 92°27′26″W	Clinton	
13	Art Scanlan House	Art Scanlan House	November 18, 1999 (#99001355)	Route 1, west of U.S. Highway 65; 35°26′52″N 92°23′38″W	Bee Branch	
14	South Side High School Sign	South Side High School Sign	January 18, 2023 (#100008573)	334 Southside Rd. 35°25′47″N 92°23′19″W	Bee Branch vicinity	
15	Titan II ICBM Launch Complex 374-7 Site		February 18, 2000 (#98001434)	West of U.S. Highway 65, 1.7 miles north of its junction with Highway 124; 35°24′51″N 92°23′47″W	Southside	
16	Van Buren County Courthouse	Van Buren County Courthouse	May 13, 1991 (#91000584)	Junction of Griggs and Main Sts. 35°35′33″N 92°27′28″W	Clinton	
17	Van Buren County Road 2E Bridge	Van Buren County Road 2E Bridge	May 5, 1995 (#95000570)	County Road 2E over a tributary of Driver's Creek; 35°30′41″N 92°41′53″W	Scotland	

== Former listings ==
	Name on the Register	Image	Date listed	Date removed	Location	City or town	Description
1	Stobaugh House		July 6, 1976 (#76000471)	March 31, 2000	AR 9, 0.5 mi. SW of Choctaw	Choctaw vicinity	

== See also ==
- List of National Historic Landmarks in Arkansas
- National Register of Historic Places listings in Arkansas
