= Damascus CCC Camp, Co. No. 3781 Historic District =

Historic district in Arkansas, United States

- U.S. National Register of Historic Places
- U.S. Historic district
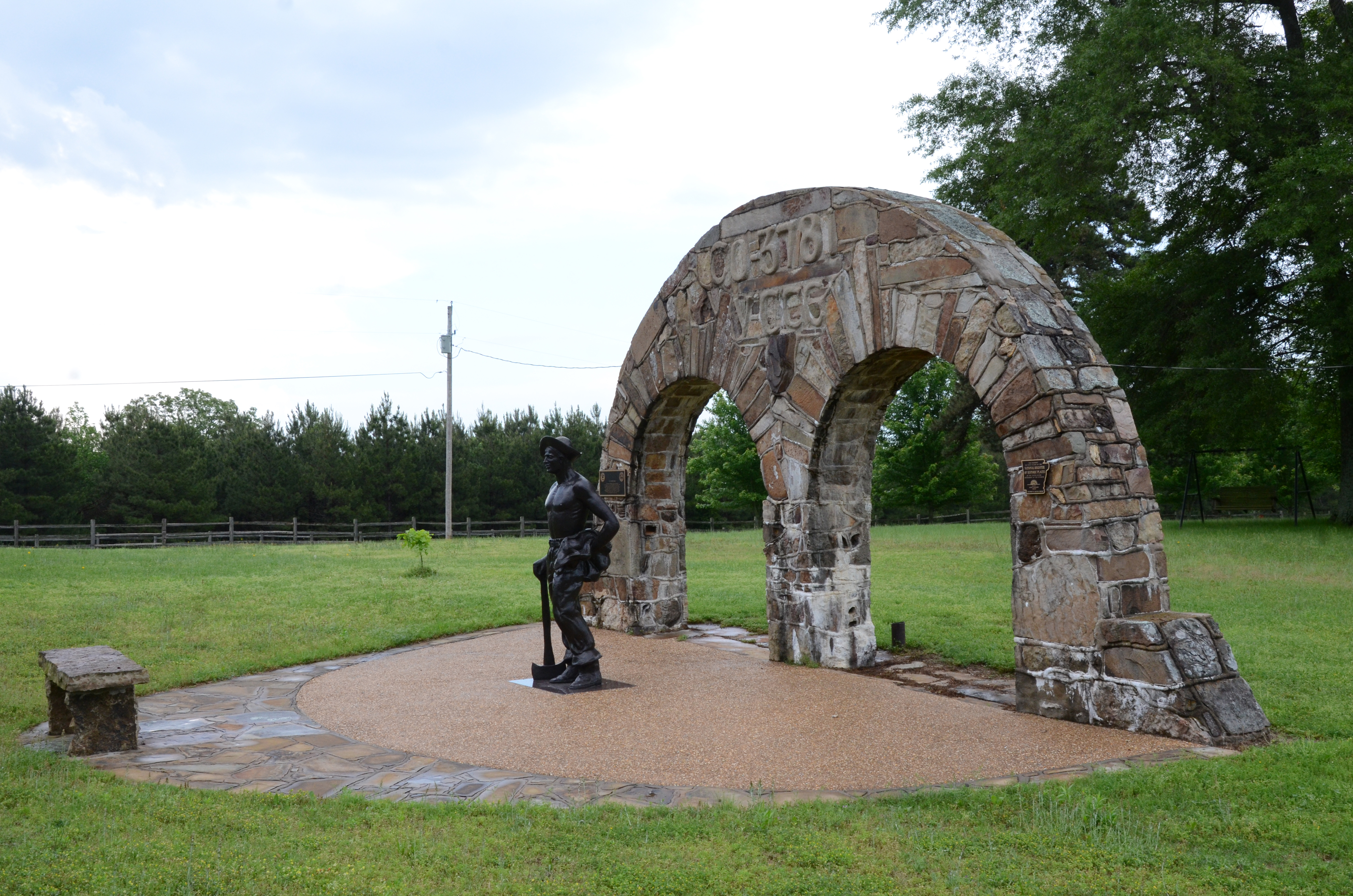

- Location within Arkansas Location within the United States
- Location: Camp Hill Rd., Damascus, Arkansas
- Coordinates: 35°22′19″N 92°23′32″W
- Area: 1.3 acres (0.53 ha)
- Built: 1935
- Built by: Civilian Conservation Corps
- Architectural style: Rustic
- MPS: Facilities Constructed by the CCC in Arkansas MPS
- NRHP reference No.: 02001631
- Added to NRHP: December 31, 2002

The Damascus CCC Camp, Co. No. 3781 was a Civilian Conservation Corps encampment on Camp Hill Road in Damascus, Arkansas. Today, only three elements of the camp infrastructure survive: a large two-span stone arch that originally marked the camp entrance, a smaller arch that was used as a notice board, and a well. All were built in 1935 or 1936. At the center of the original camp property is a single-story brick ranch house, built in 1951 by the regionally noted stonemason Silas Owens, Sr.

The camp site was listed on the National Register of Historic Places in 2002.

== See also ==
- National Register of Historic Places listings in Van Buren County, Arkansas
