= Sellers House =

Sellers House may refer to:

- Sellers House (Beebe, Arkansas), listed on the NRHP in Arkansas
- Sellers House (Conway, Arkansas), listed on the NRHP in Arkansas
- Sellers Farm, Maysville, AR, listed on the NRHP in Arkansas
- Sellers Mansion, Baltimore, MD, listed on the NRHP in Maryland
- Salome Sellers House, Deer Isle, ME, listed on the NRHP in Maine
- Cook-Sellers House, DeSoto, MS, listed on the NRHP in Mississippi
- Sellers House (Pittsburgh, Pennsylvania), listed on the NRHP in Pennsylvania
- Ball-Sellers House, Arlington, VA, listed on the NRHP in Virginia
