= Lee Service Station =

- U.S. National Register of Historic Places
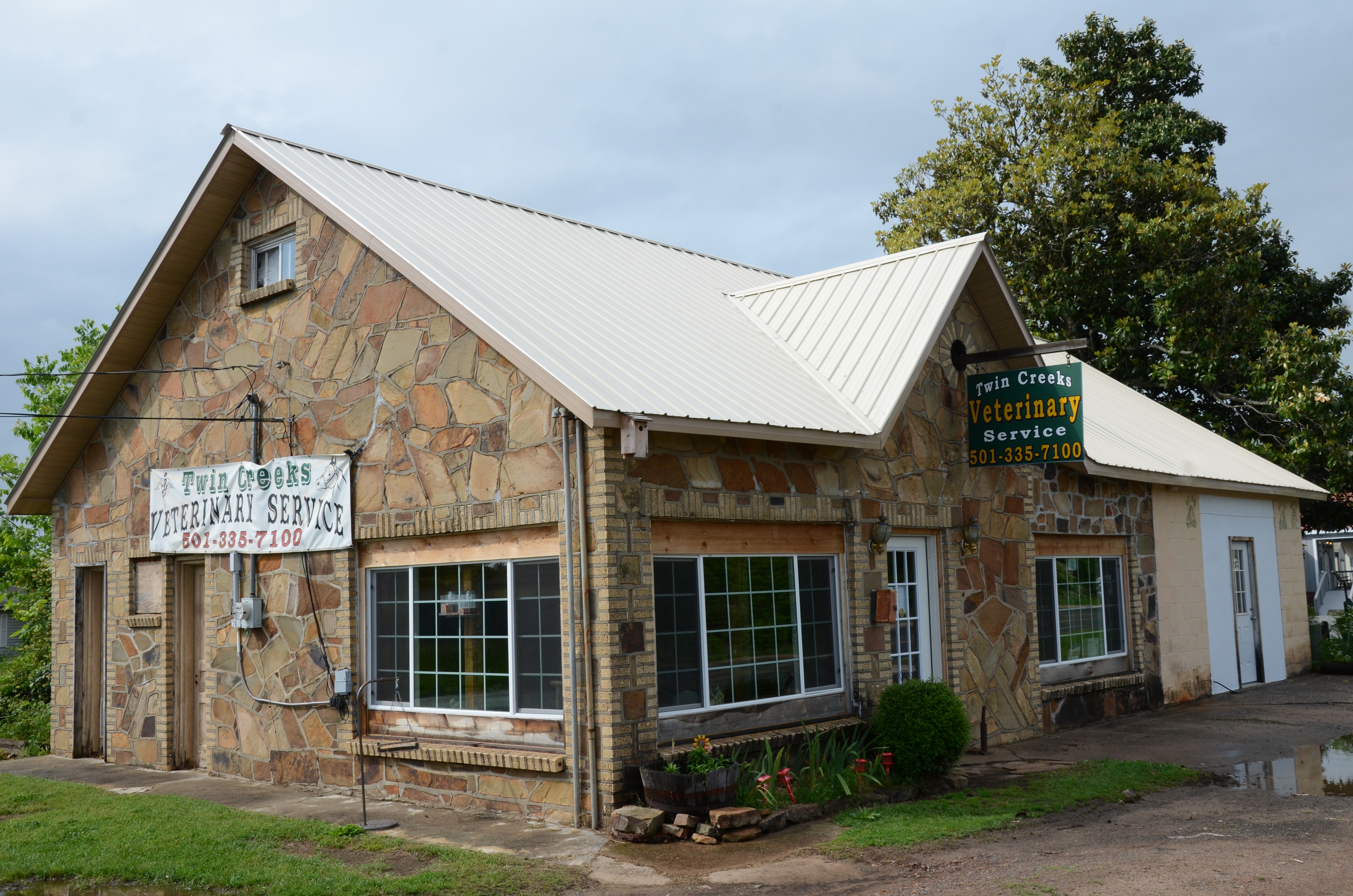

- Location within Arkansas Location within the United States
- Location: 28 South Broadway, Damascus, Arkansas
- Coordinates: 35°21′56″N 92°24′38″W
- Area: less than one acre
- Built: 1940
- Built by: Silas Owens, Sr.
- Architectural style: Bungalow/American craftsman
- MPS: Mixed Masonry Buildings of Silas Owens, Sr. MPS
- NRHP reference No.: 05000044
- Added to NRHP: February 15, 2005

The Lee Service Station is a historic commercial building at 28 South Broadway in Damascus, Arkansas. It is a single-story frame structure with a cross-gable roof configuration, its exterior finished in stone veneer with brick trim. It has a single former garage bay on the right side, the bay opening now enclosed with a pedestrian door at its center. To its left is an office space, with a center entrance flanked by a large multi-pane windows. Door and window openings are trimmed in brick laid in a three-in, three-out pattern, and the stone veneer is in a herringbone pattern. These design elements are all signatures of the builder, Silas Owens, Sr., the master mason who finished the exterior about 1940. The building served as an automobile filling and service station through the 1950s, and has since seen a variety of other commercial uses.

The building was listed on the National Register of Historic Places in 2005.

== See also ==
- National Register of Historic Places listings in Faulkner County, Arkansas
