= Melvin Chrisco House =

Historic house in Arkansas, United States

- U.S. National Register of Historic Places
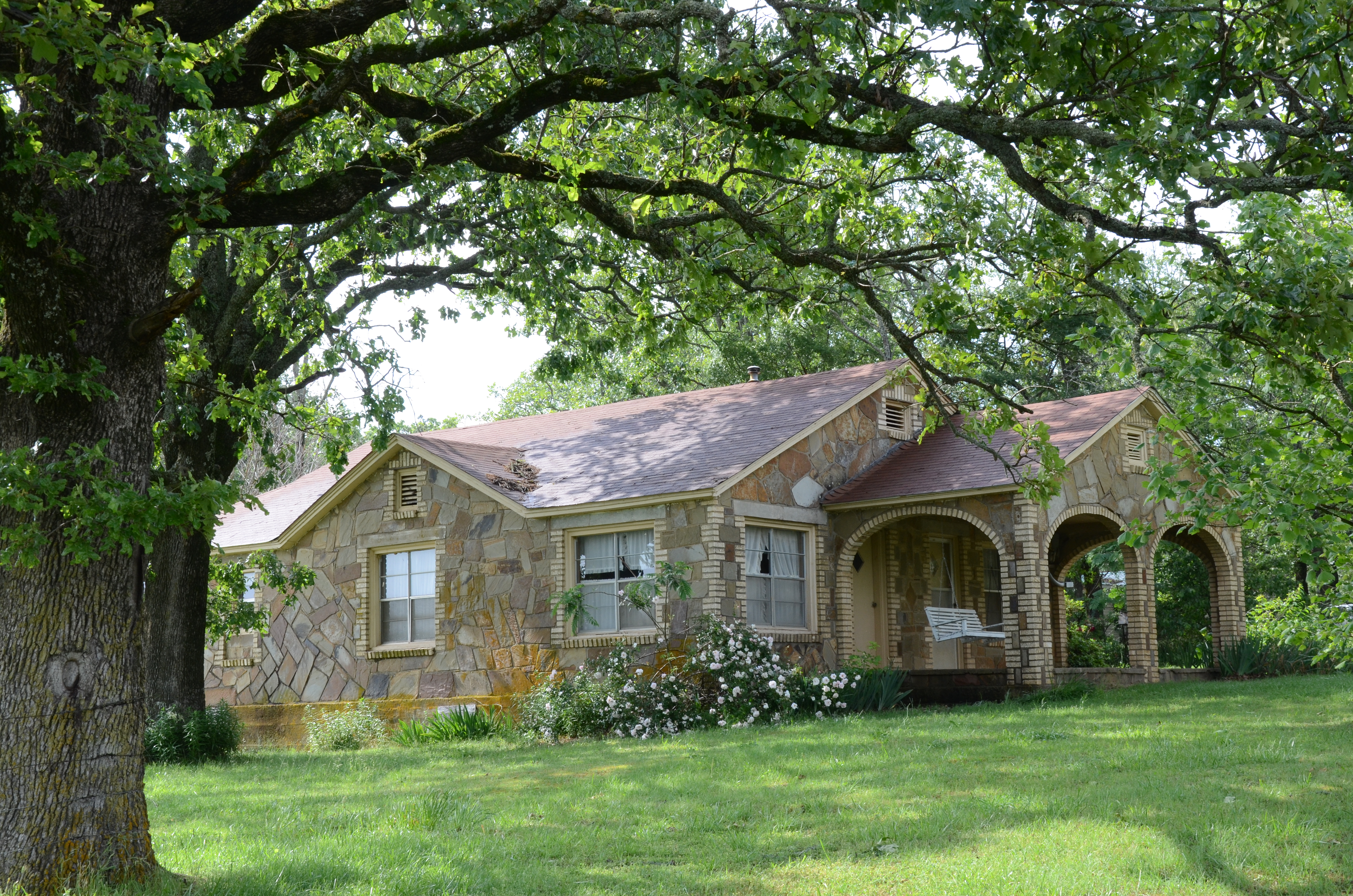

- Location within Arkansas Location within the United States
- Location: 237 Alvin Brown Rd., Damascus, Arkansas
- Coordinates: 35°22′13″N 92°25′22″W
- Area: less than one acre
- Built: 1947
- Built by: Silas Owens, Sr. (mason)
- Architectural style: Bungalow/craftsman, Minimal Traditional
- MPS: Mixed Masonry Buildings of Silas Owens, Sr. MPS
- NRHP reference No.: 05001082
- Added to NRHP: September 28, 2005

The Melvin Chrisco House is a historic house at 237 Alvin Brown Road in Damascus, Arkansas. It is a single-story wood-frame structure, with a gabled roof and an exterior of stone veneer with cream-colored brick trim. A multi-arched gabled-roofed porch shelters the front entrance. The house was built in 1947, its exterior finished by the regionally prominent African-American mason Silas Owens, Sr. It exhibits hallmarks of Owens's work, including herringbone patterning in the stone work, arched porch openings, and the use of cream brick in quoined patterns on corners and openings.

The house was listed on the National Register of Historic Places in 2005.

== See also ==
- National Register of Historic Places listings in Van Buren County, Arkansas
