= Joclin-Bradley-Bowling House =

Historic house in Arkansas, United States

- Joclin--Bradley--Bowling House
- U.S. National Register of Historic Places
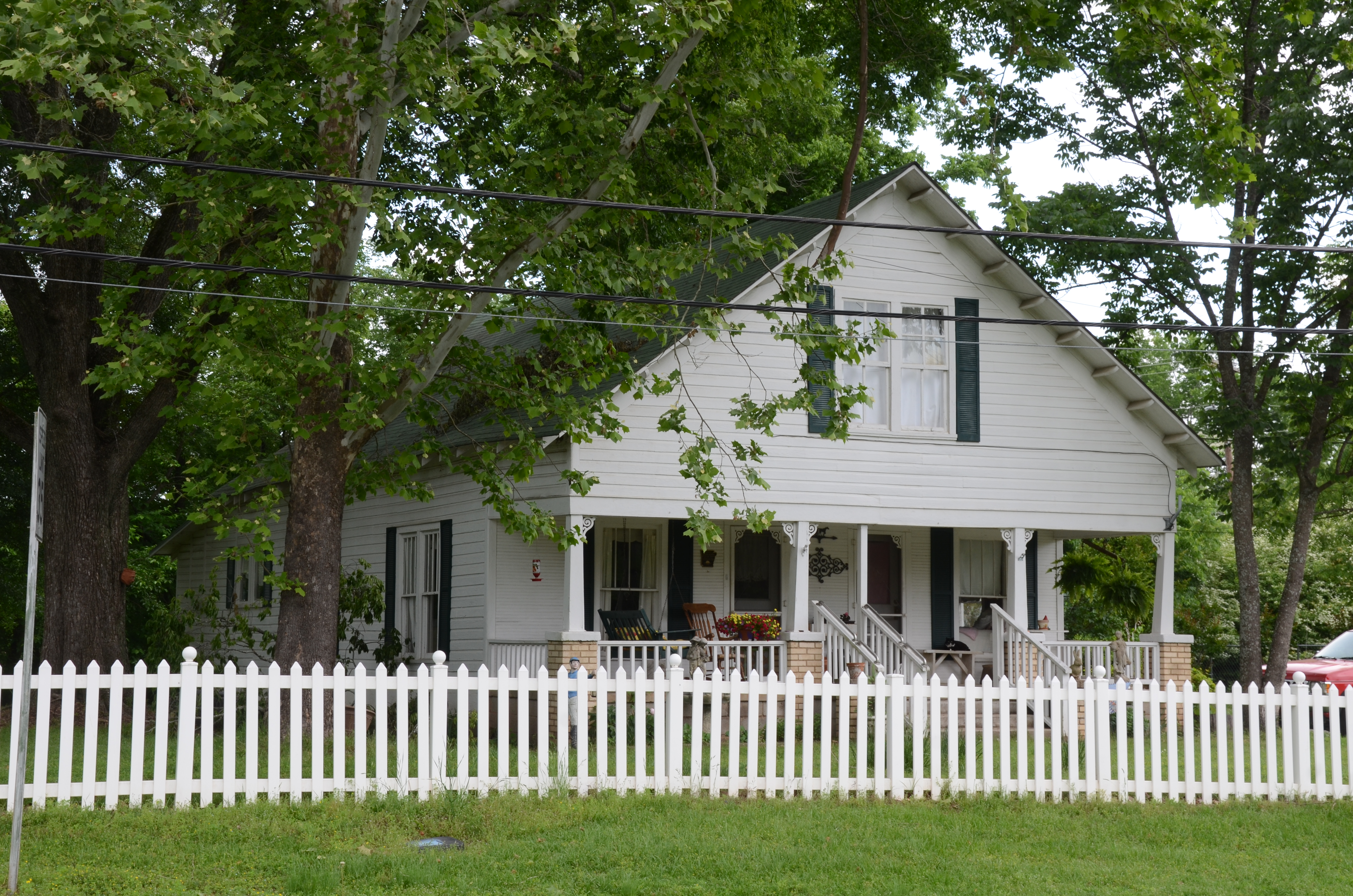

- Location within Arkansas Location within the United States
- Location: 160 AR 95 W, Clinton, Arkansas
- Coordinates: 35°35′49″N 92°27′46″W
- Area: less than one acre
- Built: 1854
- Built by: Burt Bradley
- Architectural style: Bungalow/American Craftsman
- NRHP reference No.: 06001316
- Added to NRHP: February 1, 2007

The Joclin-Bradley-Bowling House is a historic house at 160 Arkansas Highway 95W in Clinton, Arkansas. It is a 1 1/2-story wood-frame structure, with a front-facing gabled roof, weatherboard siding, and a concrete block foundation. The roof has exposed rafter ends in the gables, and shelters a recessed porch which is supported by bracketed square posts set on brick piers. The house was built in 1854, and extensively altered in 1921 to give it its current Craftsman appearance.

The house was listed on the National Register of Historic Places in 2007.

== See also ==
- National Register of Historic Places listings in Van Buren County, Arkansas
