= Walter Patterson House =

Historic house in Arkansas, United States

- U.S. National Register of Historic Places
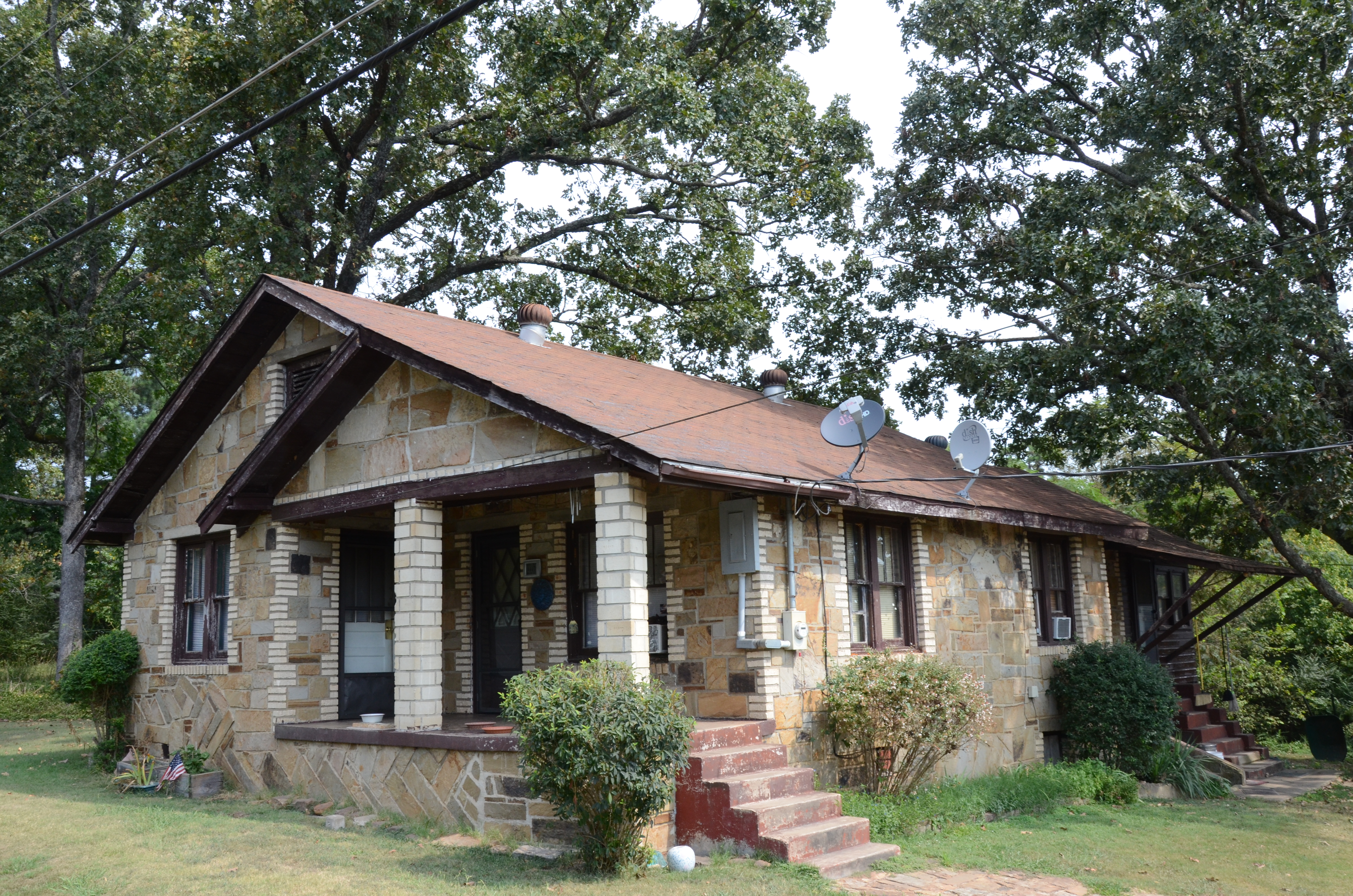

- Location within Arkansas Location within the United States
- Location: 1800 US 65N, Clinton, Arkansas
- Coordinates: 35°36′42″N 92°27′26″W
- Area: less than one acre
- Built: 1946
- Built by: Silas Owens Sr.
- Architectural style: Mixed Masonry, Craftsman
- MPS: Mixed Masonry Buildings of Silas Owens Sr. MPS
- NRHP reference No.: 07000504
- Added to NRHP: June 5, 2007

The Walter Patterson House is a historic house at 1800 United States Route 65 in Clinton, Arkansas. It is a single-story stone structure, built out of local fieldstone with cream-colored brick trim. Its gabled roof has extended eaves with exposed rafters in the Craftsman style. The house was built in 1946, its stonework done by the regionally prominent mason Silas Owens Sr.

The house was listed on the National Register of Historic Places in 2007.

== See also ==
- Walter Patterson Filling Station
- National Register of Historic Places listings in Van Buren County, Arkansas
