= Clinton Commercial Historic District (Clinton, Arkansas) =

Historic district in Arkansas, United States

- U.S. National Register of Historic Places
- U.S. Historic district
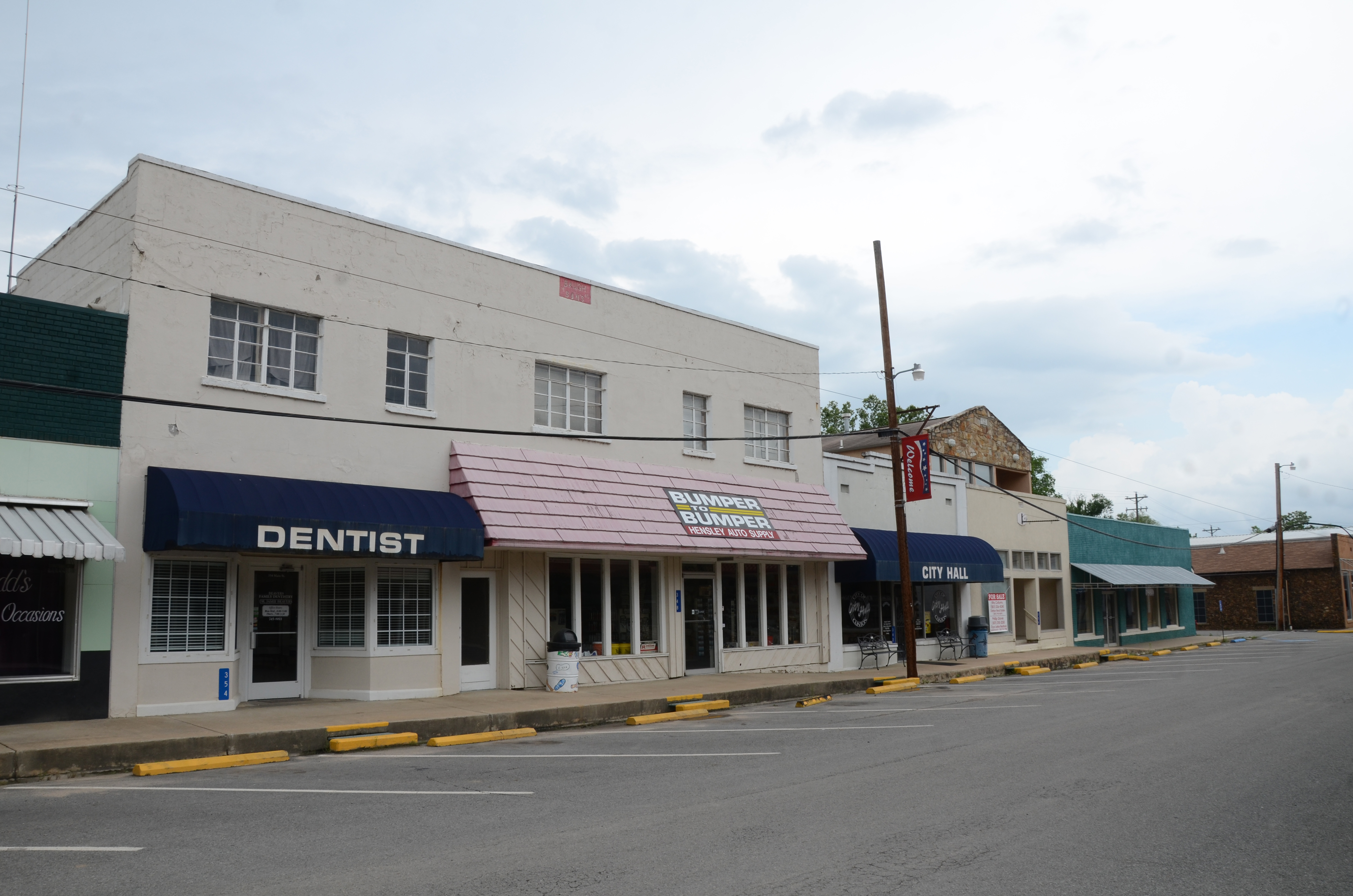

- Location within Arkansas Location within the United States
- Location: Roughly bounded by Town Branch Creek and by US 65B, Clinton, Arkansas
- Coordinates: 35°35′43″N 92°27′31″W
- Area: 45 acres (18 ha)
- Built: 1903
- Built by: Multiple, including Claud Horton, Sam Willock, Art Holloway, Sherman Ward, Cecil Jones, John Lane
- Architectural style: Tudor Revival, Bungalow/craftsman
- NRHP reference No.: 06000410
- Added to NRHP: May 15, 2006

The Clinton Commercial Historic District encompasses the historic commercial center of Clinton, Arkansas. It encompasses a roughly triangular area, bounded by Main Street, Moss Street, and United States Route 65B, extending northwest along 65B as far as Oak Street. This area's development began in the mid-19th century, but most of its buildings date from the first half of the 20th century, representing a diversity of architectural styles popular in that time period. Notable buildings in the district include the Van Buren County Courthouse and the Walter Patterson Filling Station.

The district was listed on the National Register of Historic Places in 2006.

== See also ==
- National Register of Historic Places listings in Van Buren County, Arkansas
