= Carl and Esther Lee House =

Historic house in Arkansas, United States

- U.S. National Register of Historic Places
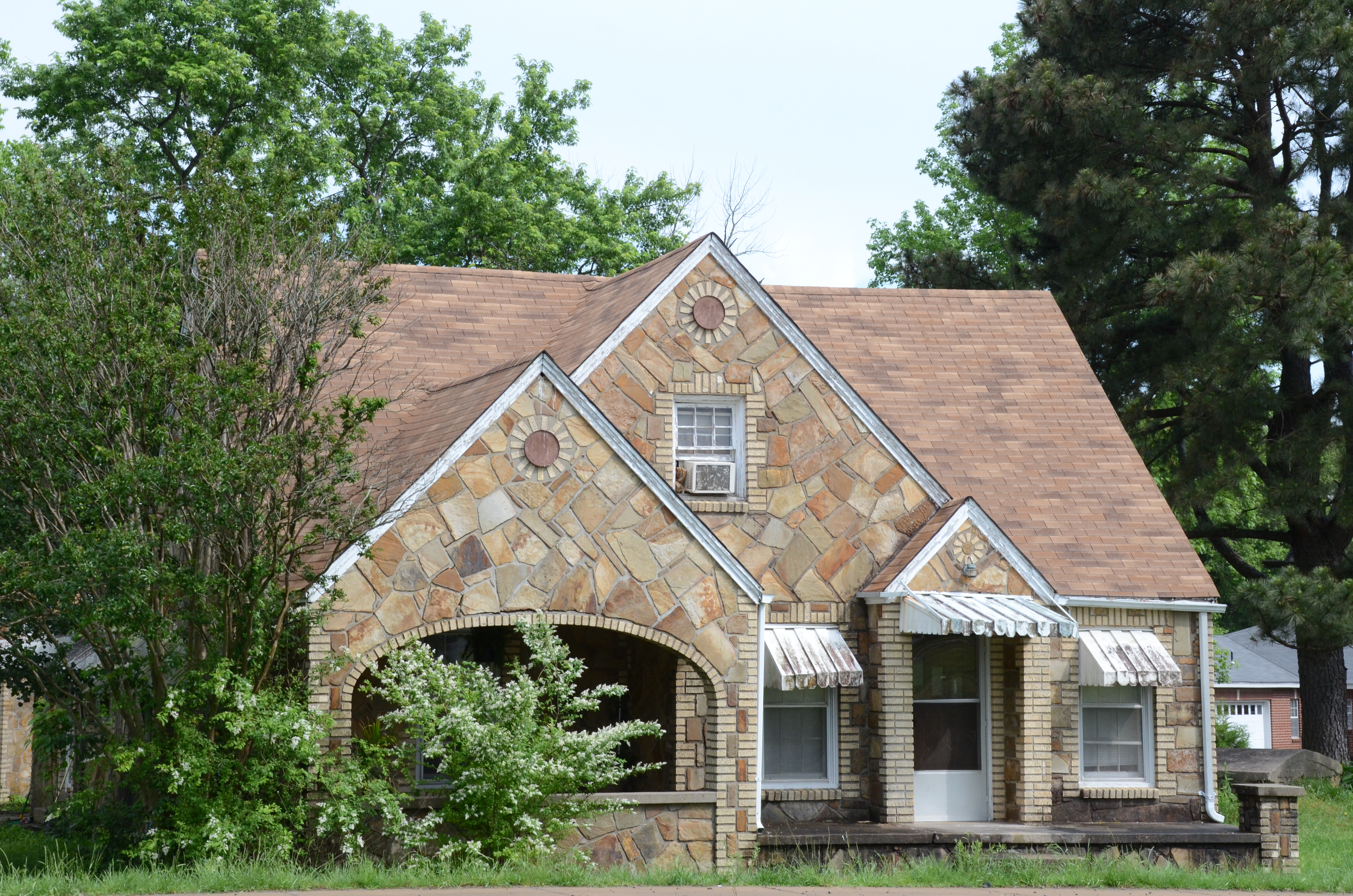

- Location within Arkansas Location within the United States
- Location: 17493 US 65S, Damascus, Arkansas
- Coordinates: 35°22′2″N 92°24′29″W
- Area: less than one acre
- Built: 1948
- Built by: Silas Owens, Sr. (stonemason)
- Architectural style: Tudor Revival, Mixed Masonry
- MPS: Mixed Masonry Buildings of Silas Owens, Sr. MPS
- NRHP reference No.: 05001170
- Added to NRHP: October 19, 2005

The Carl and Esther Lee House is a historic house at 17493 United States Route 65 West in Damascus, Arkansas. It is a 1 1/2-story wood-frame structure, with a stone veneer exterior and cream-colored brick trim. The front facade has projecting gable sections, with a porch sheltered by one such section with curved-arch openings. The larger gables have sunburst brick designs near their peaks. The house was built about 1948; the exterior stonework was done by Silas Owens, Sr., a regionally prominent stonemason. The house exhibits many of Owens's hallmarks, including the use of cream-colored brick, herringbone-patterned stonework, and arched openings.

The house was listed on the National Register of Historic Places in 2005.

== See also ==
- National Register of Historic Places listings in Van Buren County, Arkansas
