= Earl and Oza Crownover-Brown House =

Historic house in Arkansas, United States

- Earl and Oza Crownover--Brown House
- U.S. National Register of Historic Places
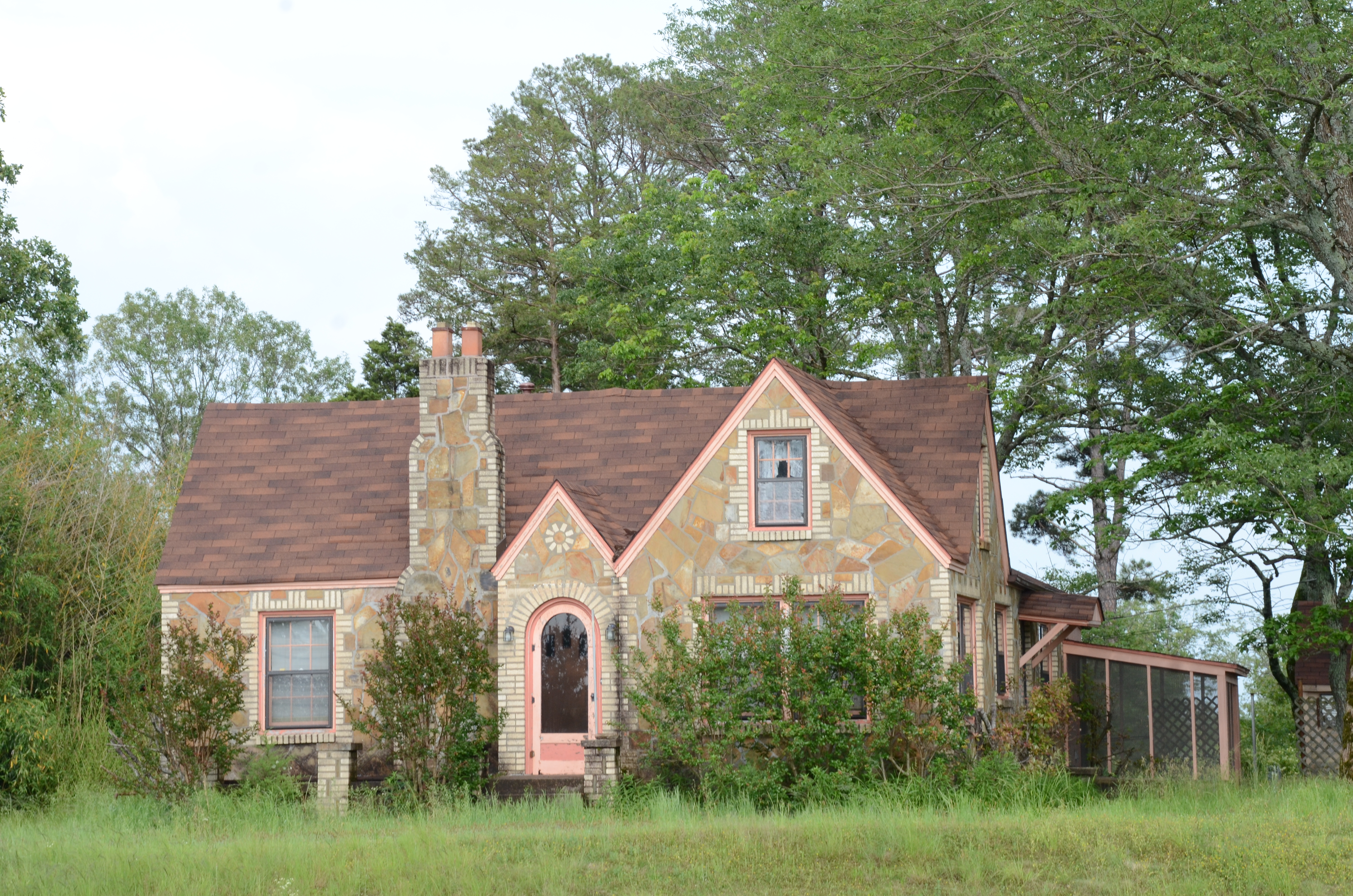

- Location within Arkansas Location within the United States
- Location: 133 S. Broadway, Damascus, Arkansas
- Coordinates: 35°21′25″N 92°24′48″W
- Area: 1.5 acres (0.61 ha)
- Built: 1943
- Built by: Silas Owens Sr.
- Architectural style: Late 19th And 20th Century Revivals, mixed masonry
- NRHP reference No.: 06000088
- Added to NRHP: March 2, 2006

The Earl and Oza Crownover-Brown House is a historic house at 133 South Broadway in Damascus, Arkansas. It is a single story masonry structure, built out of sandstone with cream-colored brick trim. It has a side gable roof, with front cross gable and a central entrance topped by a small gable, with a chimney to the door's left. The house was built 1943 by Silas Owen, Sr., a local master mason, and is one of the finest examples of his work.

The house was listed on the National Register of Historic Places in 2006.

== See also ==
- National Register of Historic Places listings in Faulkner County, Arkansas
