= Merritt House (Greenbrier, Arkansas) =

Historic house in Arkansas, United States

- U.S. National Register of Historic Places
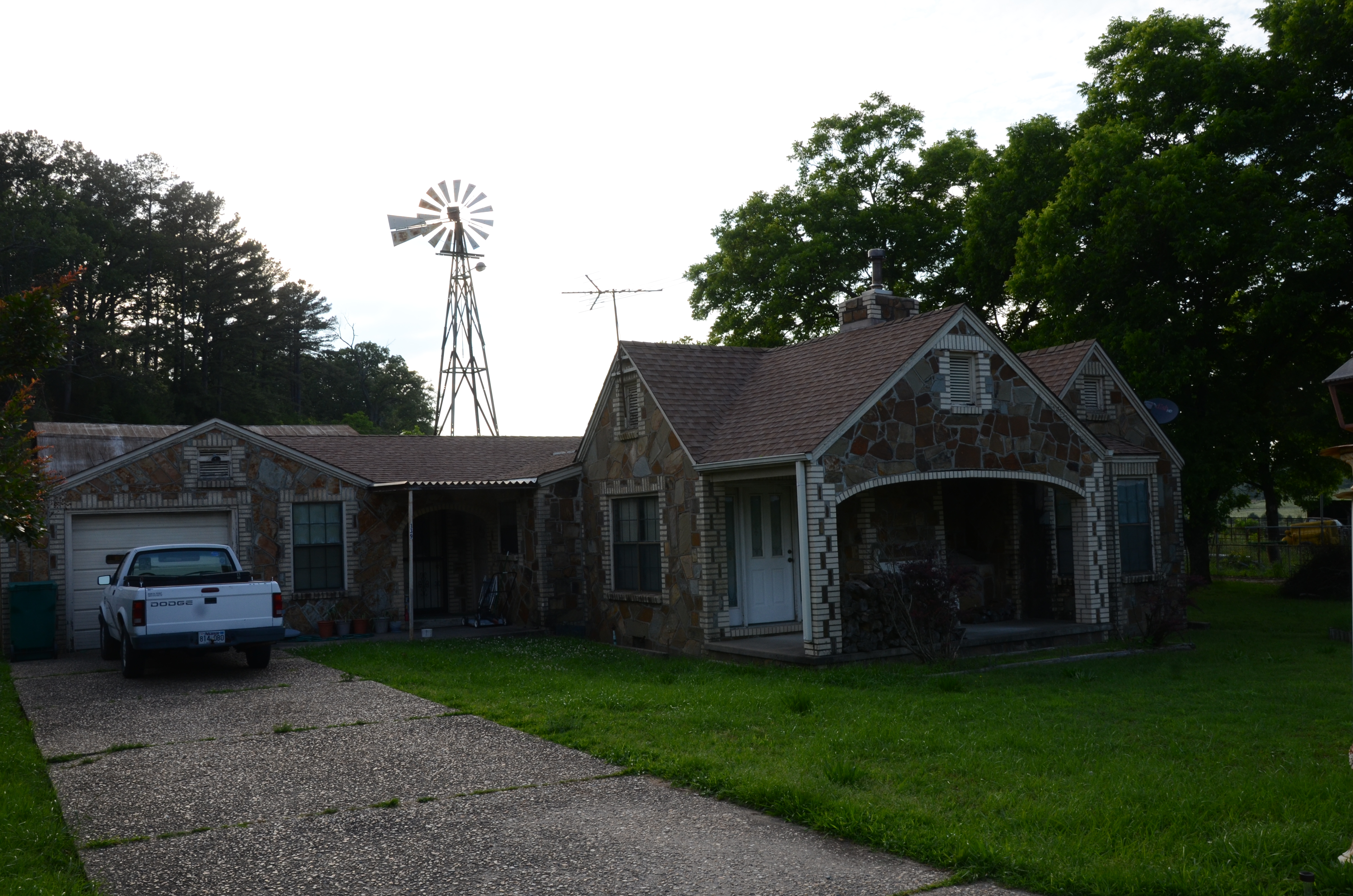

- Location within Arkansas Location within the United States
- Location: 139 N. Broadview, Greenbrier, Arkansas
- Coordinates: 35°15′15″N 92°23′16″W
- Built: 1948
- Architect: Silas Owens, Sr.
- Architectural style: Bungalow/Craftsman
- MPS: Mixed Masonry Buildings of Silas Owens, Sr. MPS
- NRHP reference No.: 05001071
- Added to NRHP: September 28, 2005

The Merritt House is a historic house at 139 North Broadview in Greenbrier, Arkansas. It is a single story wood-frame structure, finished with a masonry veneer, with an irregular plan featuring a variety of roof gables. The exterior is finished in sandstone with cream-colored brick trim. The main entrance is set under a deep front porch, whose front has a broad flat-topped arch, with a gable above that has a louver framed in brick. The house was built by Silas Owen, Sr., a local master mason, in 1948 for Billy Merritt. It was built using in part stone from a house built by Owen for Merritt's father, which had recently been torn down.

The house was listed on the National Register of Historic Places in 2005.

== See also ==
- National Register of Historic Places listings in Faulkner County, Arkansas
