= Charlie Hall House =

Historic house in Arkansas, United States

- U.S. National Register of Historic Places
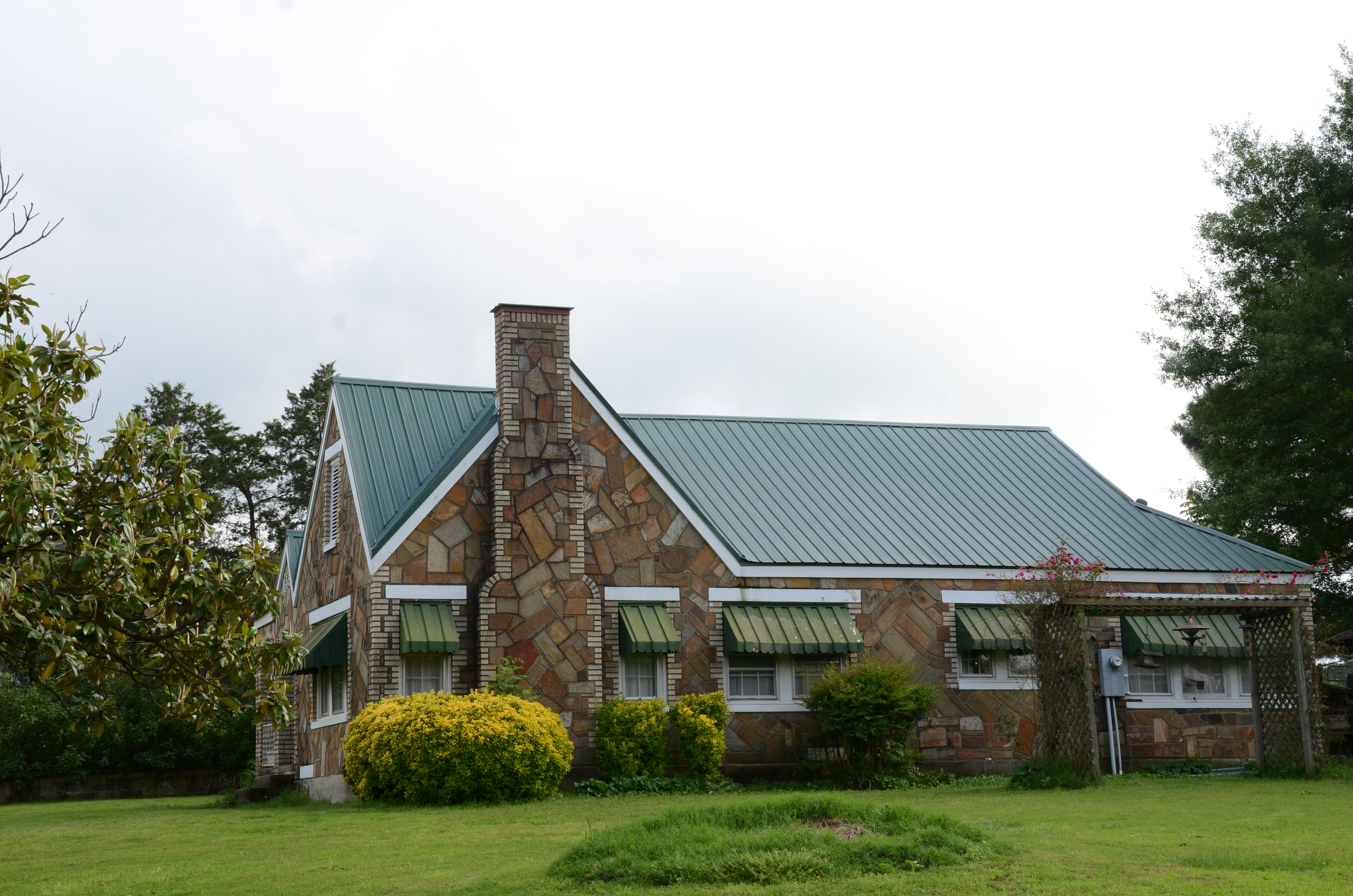

- Location within Arkansas Location within the United States
- Location: 221 Old US 65, Twin Groves, Arkansas
- Coordinates: 35°20′25″N 92°23′59″W
- Area: less than one acre
- Built: 1938
- Built by: Silas Owens Sr. (mason/carpenter)
- Architectural style: Late 19th And 20th Century Revivals, Mixed Masonry
- MPS: Mixed Masonry Buildings of Silas Owens, Sr. MPS
- NRHP reference No.: 05000492
- Added to NRHP: June 1, 2005

The Charlie Hall House is a historic house located at 221 Old United States Route 65 in Twin Groves, Arkansas. It is a single-story masonry structure built with fieldstone, concrete, and cream-colored brick trim. Its roofline features an irregular assortment of gables, with a front-facing gable that includes a central chimney. Built around 1938, it is the first known area house completed by Silas Owen Sr., a local master mason. The coursing and layout of its stonework are among Owens' highest quality works.

The house was listed on the National Register of Historic Places in 2005.

== See also ==
- National Register of Historic Places listings in Faulkner County, Arkansas
