= Tyler–Southerland House =

Historic house in Arkansas, United States

- U.S. National Register of Historic Places
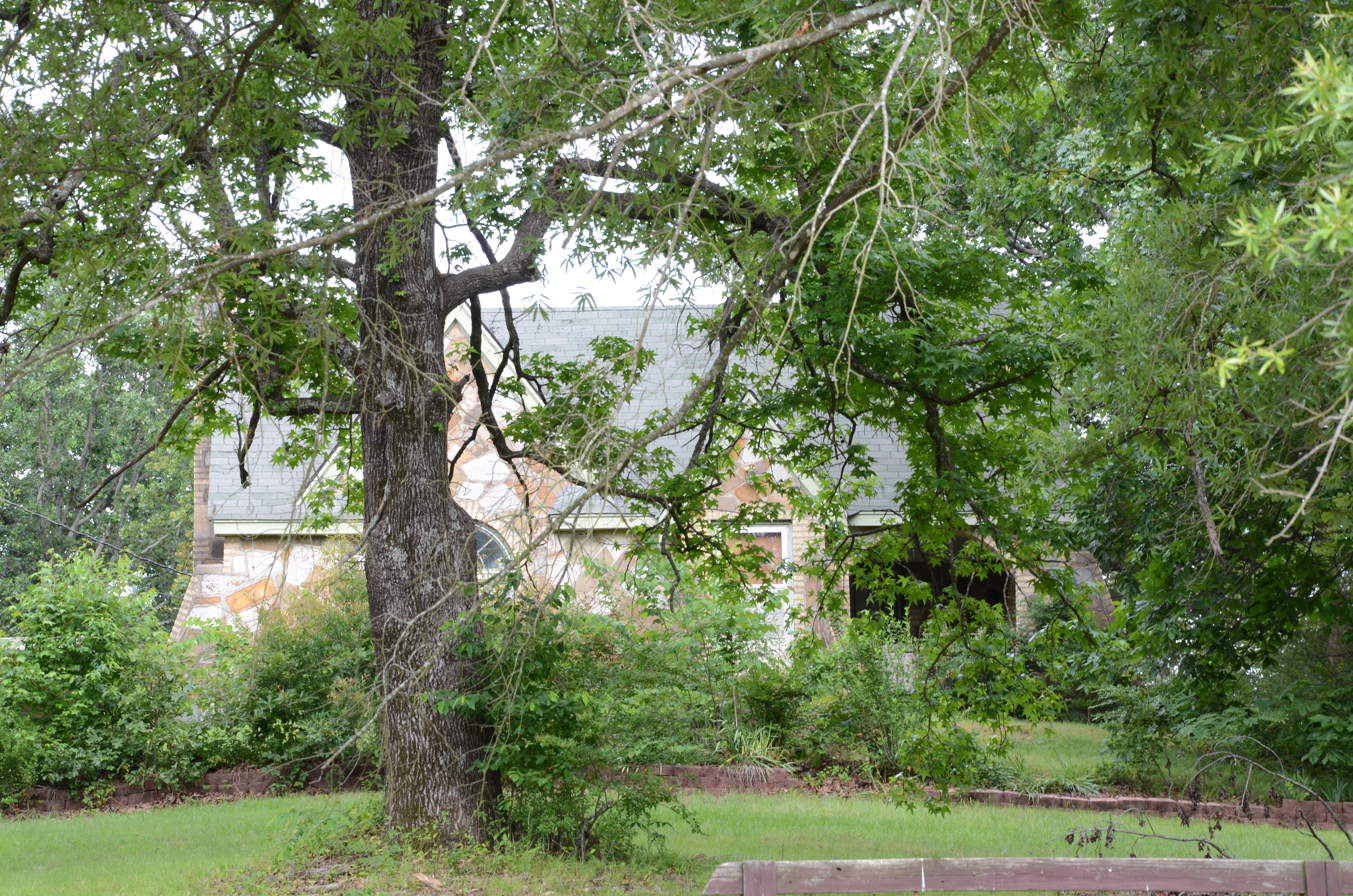

- Location within Arkansas Location within the United States
- Location: 36 Southerland Rd., Conway, Arkansas
- Coordinates: 35°4′17″N 92°24′20″W
- Area: 5.6 acres (2.3 ha)
- Built: 1948
- Architect: Silas Owens Sr.
- Architectural style: Tudor Revival, Mixed Masonry
- MPS: Mixed Masonry Buildings of Silas Owens Sr. MPS
- NRHP reference No.: 05001168
- Added to NRHP: October 19, 2005

The Tyler–Southerland House is a historic house at 36 Southerland Road in Conway, Arkansas. It is a single-story wood-frame structure, with a gable roof and stone veneer exterior. Trim consists of cream-colored brick; both it and the veneer pattern are hallmarks of the work of Silas Owens Sr., a regionally prominent African-American mason. The house was built about 1948, and is a comparatively high style example of Owens's work. It has Tudor Revival styling, including a small gable over the front entry, and a large gable over a band of windows. Angled wing walls, an unusual feature not found in most of Owens's houses, flank the main entrance.

The house was listed on the National Register of Historic Places in 2005.

== See also ==
- National Register of Historic Places listings in Faulkner County, Arkansas
