= Earl and Mildred Ward House =

Historic house in Arkansas, United States

- U.S. National Register of Historic Places
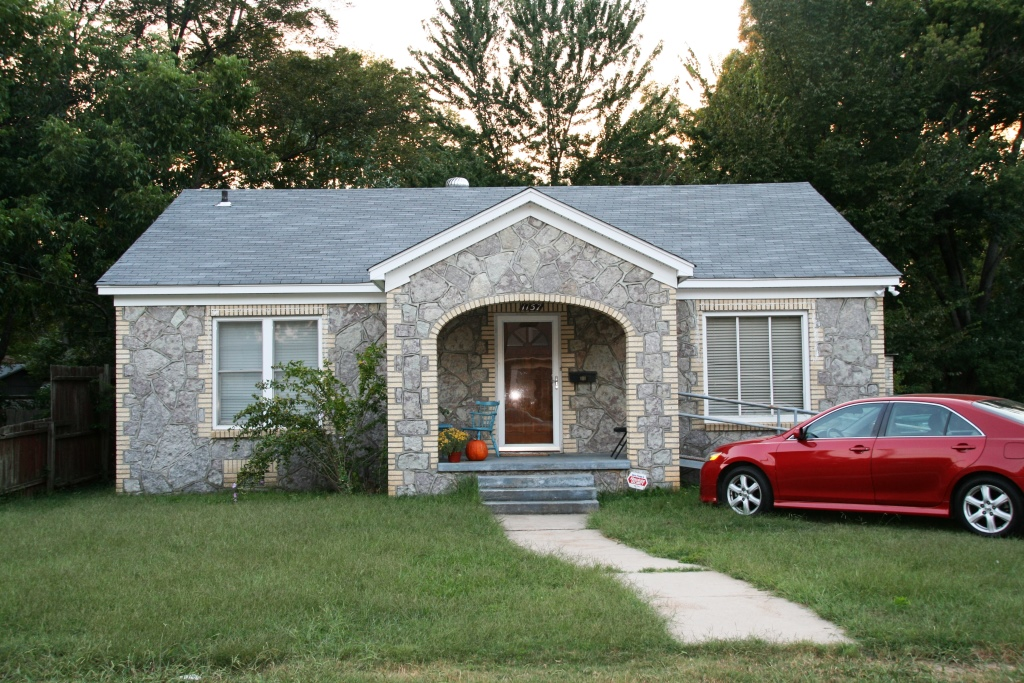

- Location within Arkansas Location within the United States
- Location: 1157 Mitchell St., Conway, Arkansas
- Coordinates: 35°5′40″N 92°26′59″W
- Area: less than one acre
- Built: 1949
- Built by: Silas Owens, Sr.
- Architectural style: Bungalow/craftsman, Mixed Masonry
- MPS: Mixed Masonry Buildings of Silas Owens, Sr. MPS
- NRHP reference No.: 05001169
- Added to NRHP: October 19, 2005

The Earl and Mildred Ward House is a historic house at 1157 Mitchell Street in Conway, Arkansas. It is a single story wood-frame structure, with a stone veneer exterior, cream-colored brick trim, and a gabled roof. A gabled porch projects from the center of the modest house, with an arched opening lined with bricks. The house was built in 1949 by African-American mason Silas Owens, Sr., and is the only house he is known to have done in granite instead of his preferred sandstone.

The house was listed on the National Register of Historic Places in 2005.

== See also ==
- National Register of Historic Places listings in Faulkner County, Arkansas
