= Walter Patterson Filling Station =

- U.S. National Register of Historic Places
- U.S. Historic district – Contributing property
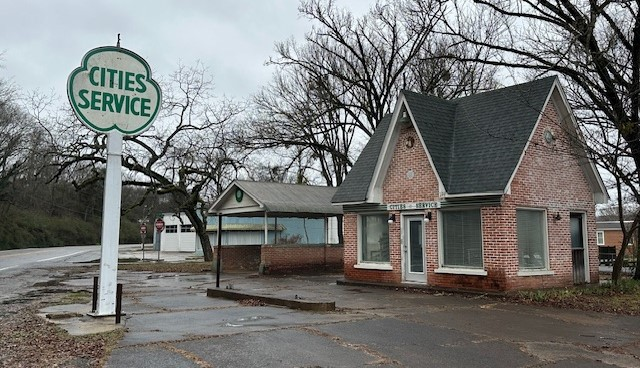
- The Walter Patterson Filling Station in Clinton Ark., February 2025

- Location within Arkansas Location within the United States
- Location: US 65, bet. Griggs and Court Sts., Clinton, Arkansas
- Coordinates: 35°35′29″N 92°27′26″W
- Area: less than one acre
- Built: 1936
- Architectural style: Tudor Revival
- Part of: Clinton Commercial Historic District (ID06000410)
- MPS: Arkansas Highway History and Architecture MPS
- NRHP reference No.: 01000074

Significant dates
- Added to NRHP: February 9, 2001
- Designated CP: May 15, 2006

The Walter Patterson Filling Station is a historic automotive service station building on United States Route 65 in central Clinton, Arkansas. It is a small single-story brick building, with a steeply pitched gable roof. The front of the building is symmetrical, with a central entrance flanked by square single-pane display windows, and a cross-gable above the entrance. Built in 1936, it is the only gas station from that period to survive in the city, and is a good example of commercial English Revival architecture.

The building was listed on the National Register of Historic Places in 2001.

== See also ==
- Walter Patterson House
- National Register of Historic Places listings in Van Buren County, Arkansas
