= Collums-Baker House =

Historic house in Arkansas, United States

- U.S. National Register of Historic Places
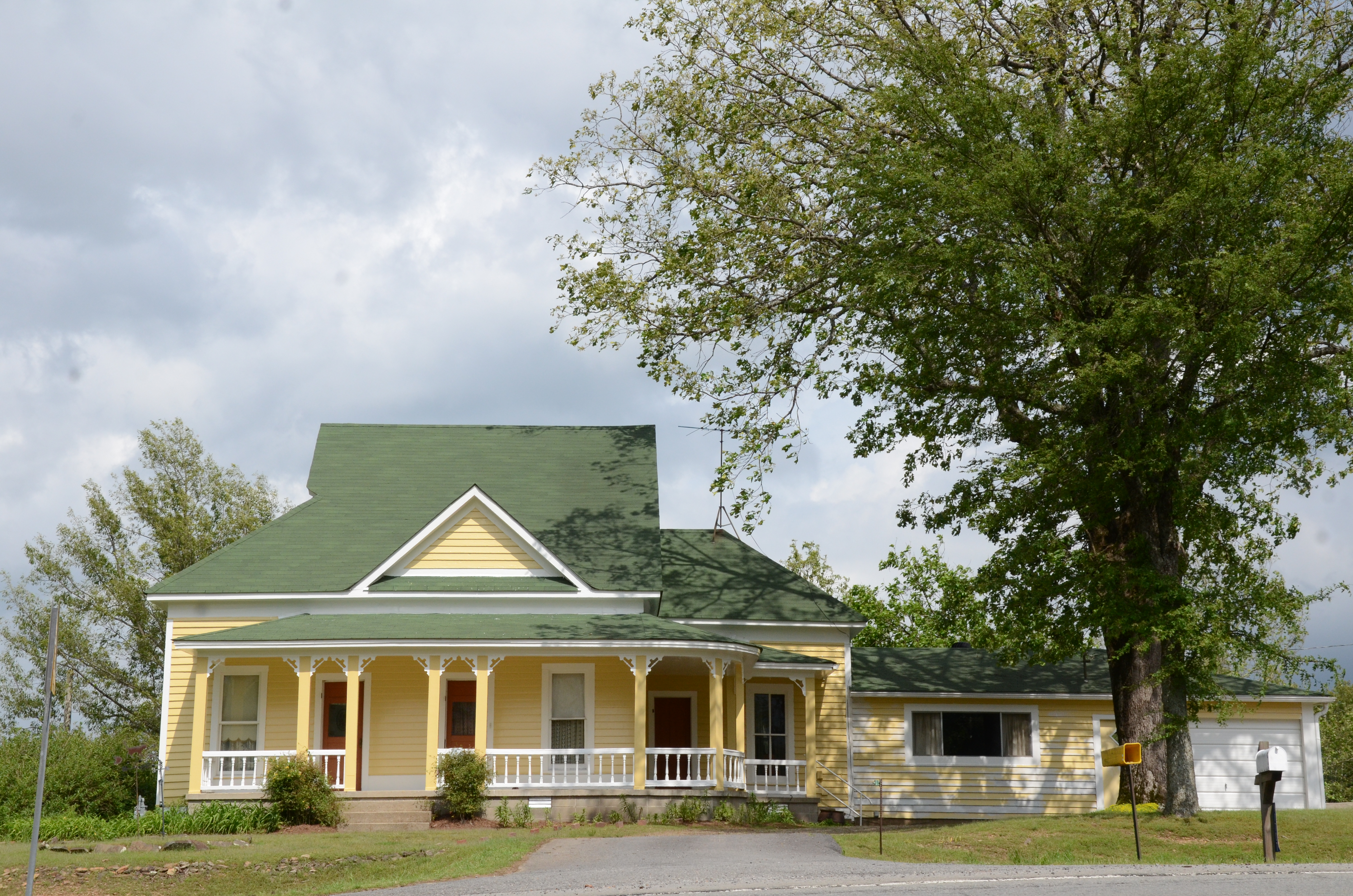

- Location within Arkansas Location within the United States
- Nearest city: Eastern side of U.S. Highway 65, approximately 0.5 miles (0.80 km) south of Bee Branch, Arkansas
- Coordinates: 35°26′38″N 92°23′21″W
- Area: 1 acre (0.40 ha)
- Built: 1907
- Built by: Columbus Scroggins
- Architect: Columbus Scroggins
- Architectural style: Late Victorian, Folk Victorian
- NRHP reference No.: 92001282
- Added to NRHP: November 24, 1992

The Collums-Baker House is a historic house on the east side of United States Route 65, about 0.5 miles (0.80 km) south of Bee Branch, Arkansas. It is a 1 1/2-story wood-frame structure, with an irregular roof line and massing, set on a block foundation. Its main block has a roof that is gabled on one end, with gable-on-hip on the other, and a lower hip-roofed section to the right, with a single-story hip-roofed ell extending further to the right. A single-story hip-roof porch extends across the main section, featuring turned posts and decorative brackets.

Built in 1907, it is the best local example of the Folk Victorian style. The house shares characteristics with the Art Scanlan House, suggesting both may have the same builder.

The house was listed on the National Register of Historic Places in 1992.

== See also ==
- National Register of Historic Places listings in Van Buren County, Arkansas
