= Richard and Mettie Ealy House =

Historic house in Arkansas, United States

- U.S. National Register of Historic Places
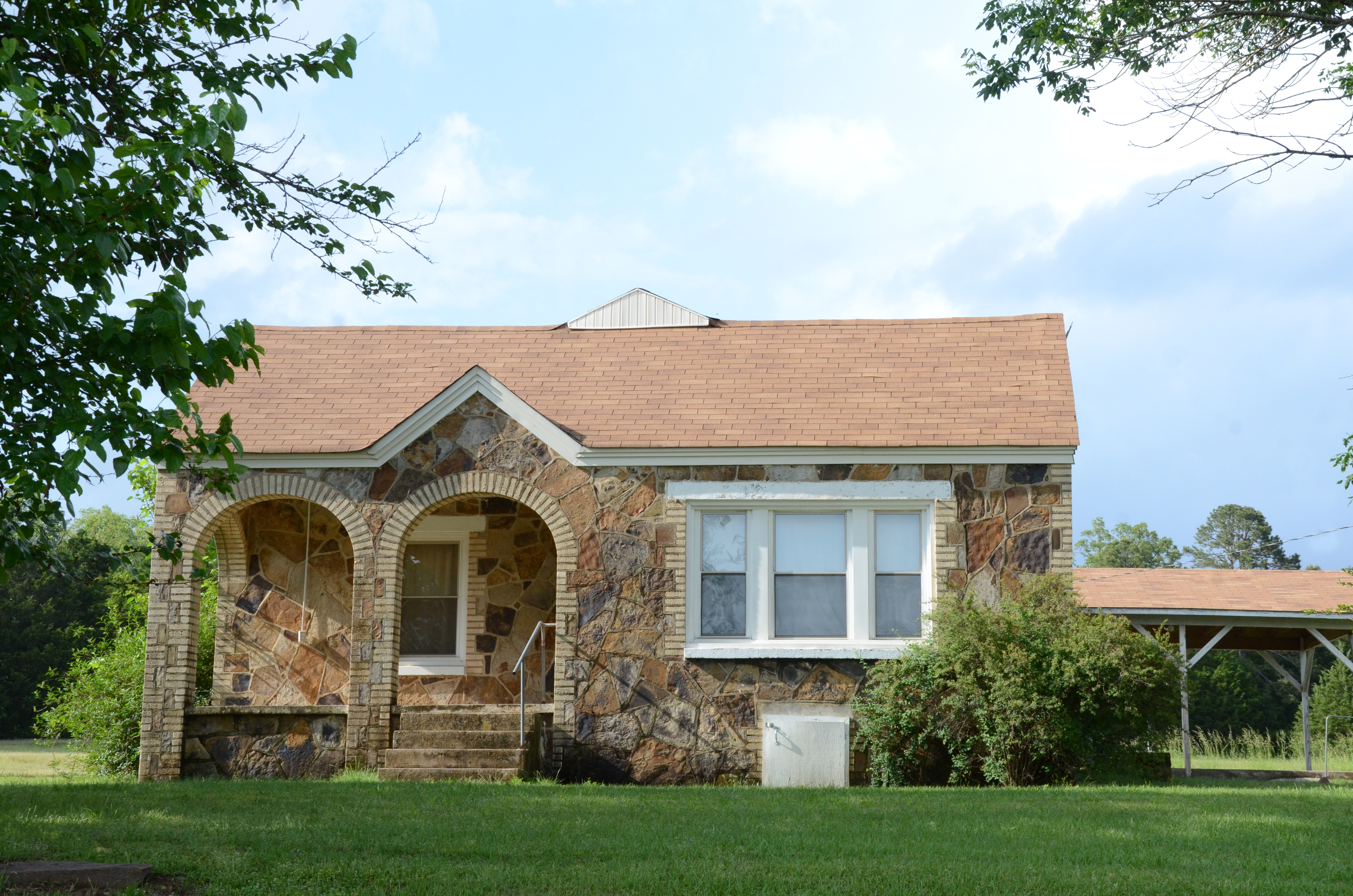

- Location within Arkansas Location within the United States
- Location: 280 Solomon Grove Rd., Twin Groves, Arkansas
- Coordinates: 35°18′45″N 92°26′51″W
- Area: less than one acre
- Built: 1942
- Built by: Silas Owens Sr.
- Architectural style: Bungalow/American craftsman
- MPS: Mixed Masonry Buildings of Silas Owens, Sr. MPS
- NRHP reference No.: 05001069
- Added to NRHP: September 30, 2005

The Richard and Mettie Ealy House is a historic house at 280 Solomon Grove Road in Twin Groves, Arkansas. It is a single story masonry structure, built out of sandstone with cream-colored brick trim. It has a cross-gable roof configuration, and a recessed porch with an arcade of rounded arches. It was built in 1942, replacing a wood-frame home destroyed by fire. It was built by Silas Owens, Sr., a local master mason, for his first cousin and wife.

The house was listed on the National Register of Historic Places in 2005.

== See also ==
- National Register of Historic Places listings in Faulkner County, Arkansas
