= James and Jewell Salter House =

Historic house in Arkansas, United States

- U.S. National Register of Historic Places
- Location within Arkansas Location within the United States
- Location: 159 S. Broadview, Greenbrier, Arkansas
- Coordinates: 35°12′50″N 92°23′19″W
- Area: less than one acre
- Built: 1945
- Built by: Silas Owens, Sr.
- Architectural style: Late 19th And 20th Century Revivals, Mixed Masonry
- MPS: Mixed Masonry Buildings of Silas Owens, Sr. MPS
- NRHP reference No.: 05000495
- Added to NRHP: June 1, 2005

The James and Jewell Salter House was a historic house at 159 South Broadview in Greenbrier, Arkansas. It was a single-story wood-frame structure, finished in stone veneer with cream-colored brick trim elements. It was built about 1945, its exterior masonry done by Silas Owens, Sr., a regionally prominent African-American stonemason. It was unusual among Owens's works as an example of English Revival architecture done with his stylistic touches.

The house was listed on the National Register of Historic Places in 2005. It is listed as destroyed in the Arkansas Historic Preservation Program database.

== See also ==
- National Register of Historic Places listings in Faulkner County, Arkansas
