= Monica Potts =

American journalist and non-fiction writer

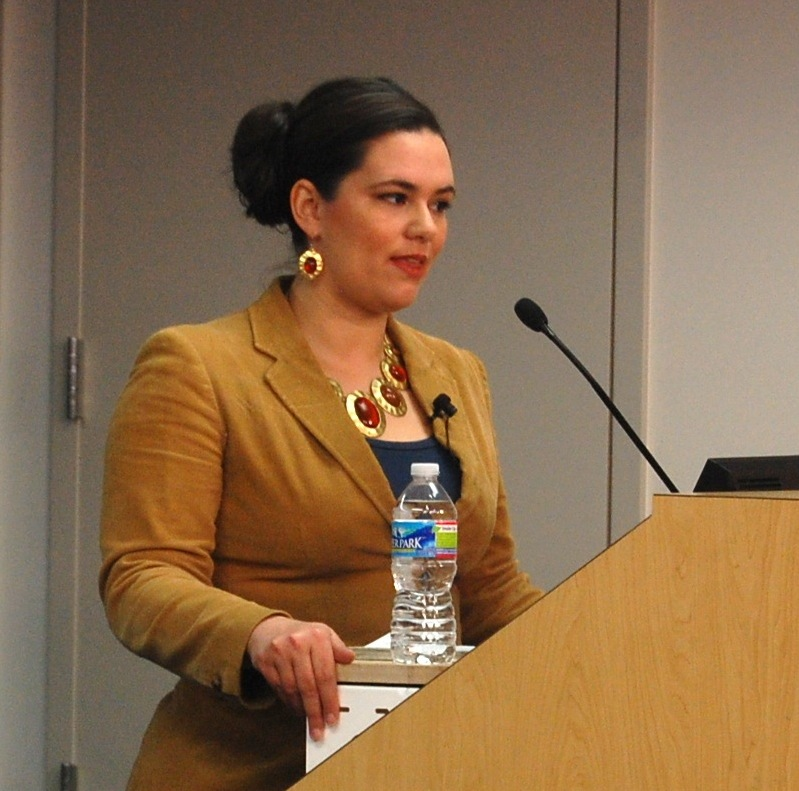
Monica Potts speaking at an event on homelessness

Monica Potts is an American journalist and non-fiction writer. She wrote for The American Prospect and FiveThirtyEight. She is currently a staff writer covering class politics for The New Republic. In 2012 she won The Sidney Award.

== Life ==
Potts grew up in Clinton, Arkansas. She graduated from Bryn Mawr College and Columbia University. In 2016, she was a New America fellow.

Her work has appeared in New York, The New York Times, The Nation, The Atlantic, The New Republic, The Texas Observer, Vice, Vogue, and NPR.

In 2023, Random House published Potts's first non-fiction book, "The Forgotten Girls: A Memoir of Friendship and Lost Promise in Rural America". The book explores the lives of rural American women in Clinton, Arkansas, Potts's hometown.

== Works ==
- The Forgotten Girls. Random House. 2023-05-30. ISBN 978-0-593-73089-8.
