= E.E. Hooten House =

Historic house in Arkansas, United States

- U.S. National Register of Historic Places
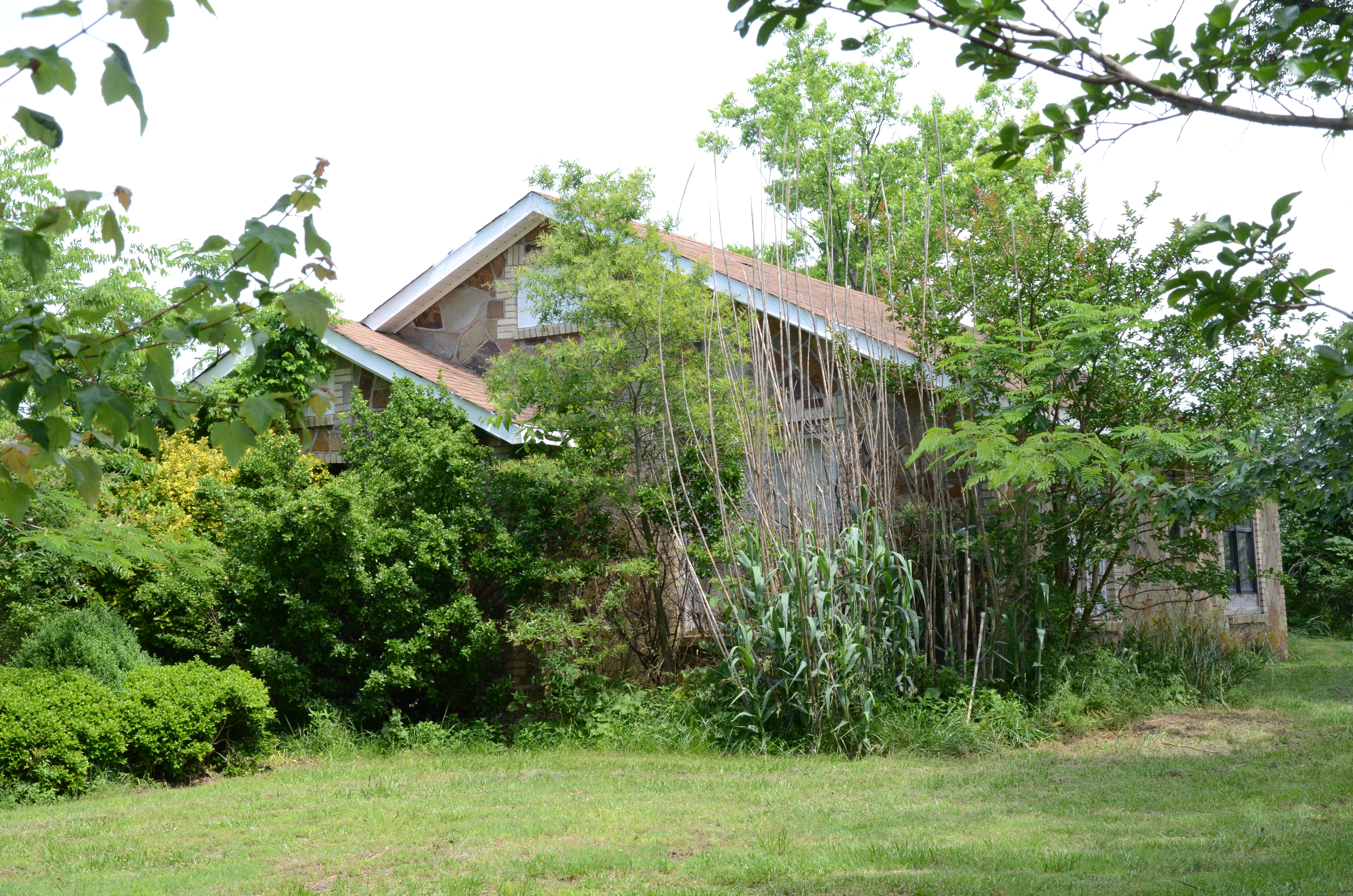

- Location within Arkansas Location within the United States
- Nearest city: Guy, Arkansas
- Coordinates: 35°19′13″N 92°20′17″W
- Area: less than one acre
- Built: 1935
- Built by: Silas Owens Sr.
- Architectural style: Bungalow/craftsman
- MPS: Mixed Masonry Buildings of Silas Owens, Sr. MPS
- NRHP reference No.: 05000039
- Added to NRHP: February 15, 2005

The E.E. Hooten House is a historic house at 400 Arkansas Highway 25 in Guy, Arkansas. It is a single story rectangular wood-frame structure, its exterior finished in veneered stone and cream-colored brick. A gabled porch projects from the front, sheltering the main entrance, and featuring stone supports rising to rounded arch openings. The house was probably built in the 1930s, but is notable for the applied stone veneer, which is the work of Silas Owens Sr., a prominent local mason known for his distinctive styles of stone and brickwork.

The house was listed on the National Register of Historic Places in 2005.

== See also ==
- National Register of Historic Places listings in Faulkner County, Arkansas
