= Van Buren County Courthouse (Arkansas) =

- U.S. National Register of Historic Places
- U.S. Historic district – Contributing property
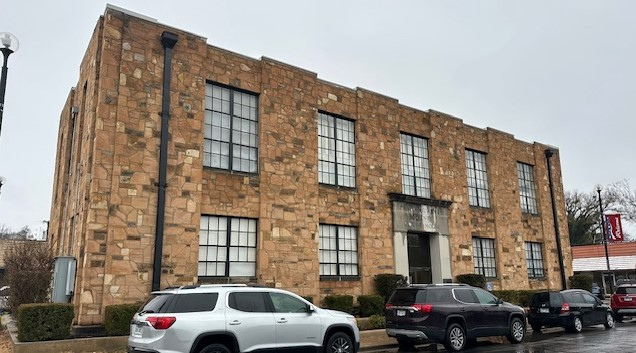
- The Van Buren County Courthouse in Clinton, Ark., February 2025

- Location within Arkansas Location within the United States
- Location: Jct. of Griggs and Main Sts., Clinton, Arkansas
- Coordinates: 35°35′33″N 92°27′28″W
- Built: 1934
- Architect: Erhart & Eichenbaum
- Architectural style: Art Deco, WPA Rustic House
- Part of: Clinton Commercial Historic District (ID06000410)
- NRHP reference No.: 91000584

Significant dates
- Added to NRHP: May 13, 1991
- Designated CP: May 15, 2006

The Van Buren County Courthouse is located at the corner of Griggs and Main Streets in downtown Clinton, Arkansas, the county seat of Van Buren County. It is a two-story masonry structure, built primarily out of local stone. Its main facade is five bays wide, each flanked by broad sections that project a small amount. The main entrance is in the center bay, with a concrete surround of pilasters and a tall corniced entablature. It was built in 1934 with funding support from the federal Works Progress Administration, and was the county's third courthouse to be located in Clinton.

The building was listed on the National Register of Historic Places in 1991.

== See also ==
- List of county courthouses in Arkansas
- National Register of Historic Places listings in Van Buren County, Arkansas
