= Washburn House (Guy, Arkansas) =

Historic house in Arkansas, United States

- U.S. National Register of Historic Places
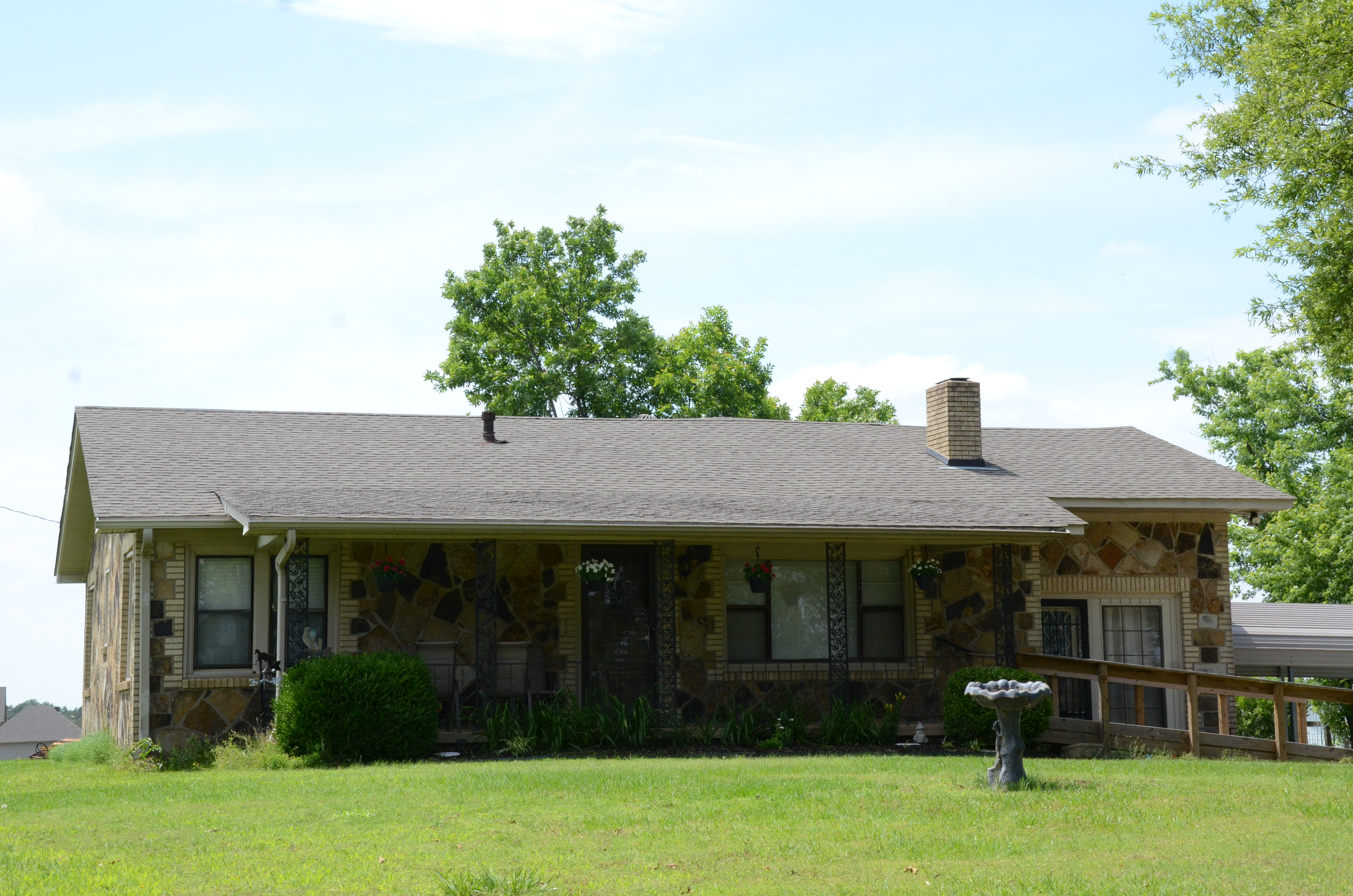

- Location within Arkansas Location within the United States
- Location: 40 Battles Loop, Guy, Arkansas
- Coordinates: 35°19′3″N 92°21′31″W
- Area: less than one acre
- Built: 1953
- Architect: Silas Owens, Sr.
- Architectural style: Mixed Masonry
- MPS: Mixed Masonry Buildings of Silas Owens, Sr. MPS
- NRHP reference No.: 06001279
- Added to NRHP: January 23, 2007

The Washburn House is a historic house at 40 Battles Loop in Guy, Arkansas. It is a single story Ranch style house with a gabled roof. It has wood-frame construction, but is finished in sandstone veneer with cream-colored brick trim, hallmarks of the construction style of a noted regional African-American mason, Silas Owens Sr., who built this house in 1953. It features quoined brick surrounds for the doors and windows and a front porch whose roof is an extension of the main roof, with wrought iron posts.

The house was listed on the National Register of Historic Places in 2007.

== See also ==
- National Register of Historic Places listings in Faulkner County, Arkansas
