= S.D. Merritt House =

Historic house in Arkansas, United States

- U.S. National Register of Historic Places
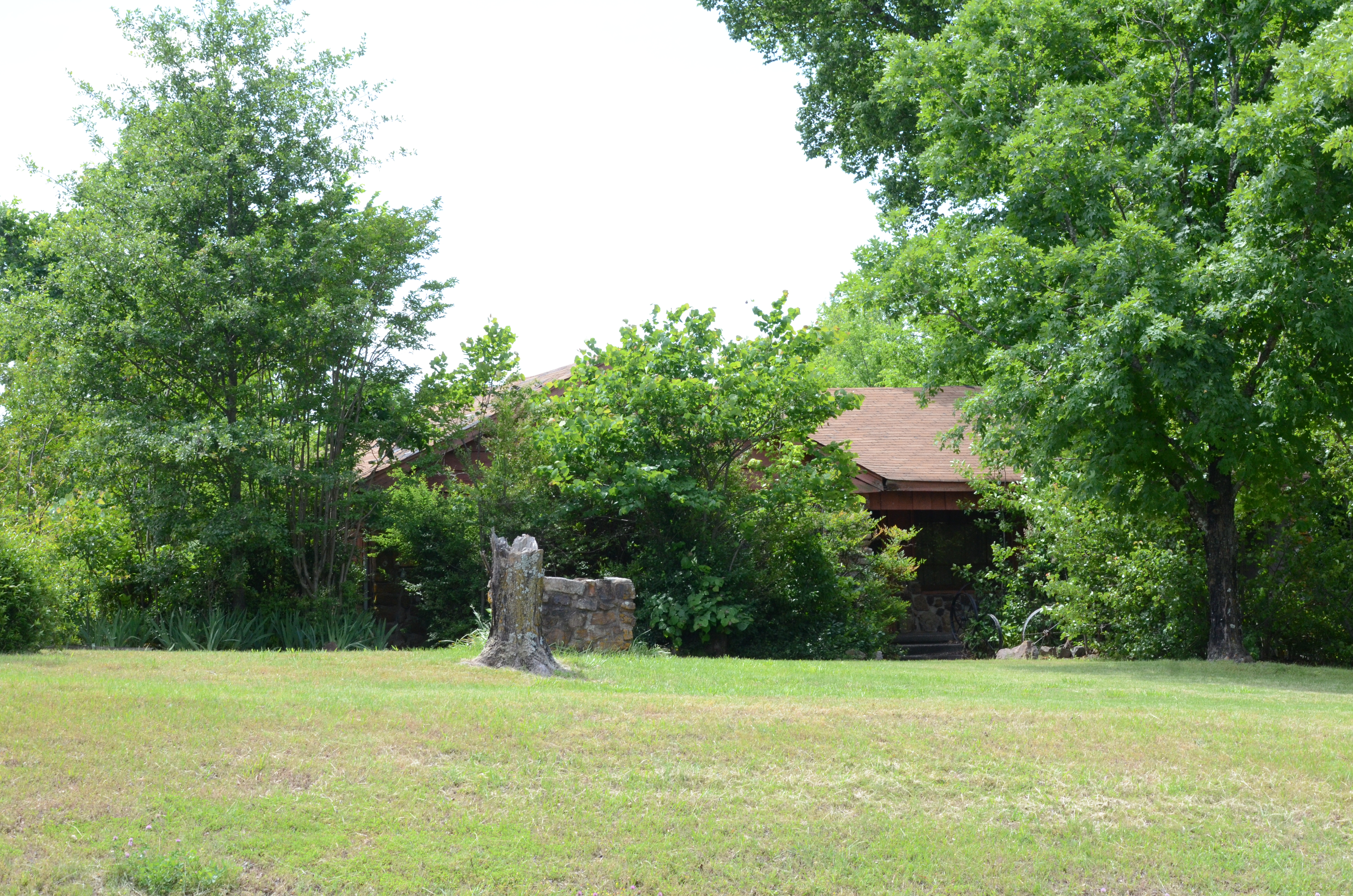

- Location within Arkansas Location within the United States
- Nearest city: Greenbrier, Arkansas
- Coordinates: 35°16′24″N 92°22′59″W
- Area: less than one acre
- Built: 1950
- Built by: Silas Owens Sr., Silas Owens Jr.
- Architect: Silas Owens Sr.
- Architectural style: Modern Movement, Minimal Traditional
- MPS: Mixed Masonry Buildings of Silas Owens, Sr. MPS
- NRHP reference No.: 05000038
- Added to NRHP: February 15, 2005

The S.D. Merritt House is a historic house at 45 Arkansas Highway 25 North in Greenbrier, Arkansas. It is a single story masonry structure, its exterior clad in a distinctive combination of fieldstone laid in herringbone patterns, and cream-colored brick trim. It was designed by Silas Owens, Sr., a prominent regional African-American mason, and built c. 1950 by Owens and his son, Silas Jr. It is a basically L-shaped structure, with a covered carport at the left end, and a forward-projecting section on the right.

The house was listed on the National Register of Historic Places in 2005.

== See also ==
- National Register of Historic Places listings in Faulkner County, Arkansas
