= Mallettown United Methodist Church =

Historic church in Arkansas, United States

- U.S. National Register of Historic Places
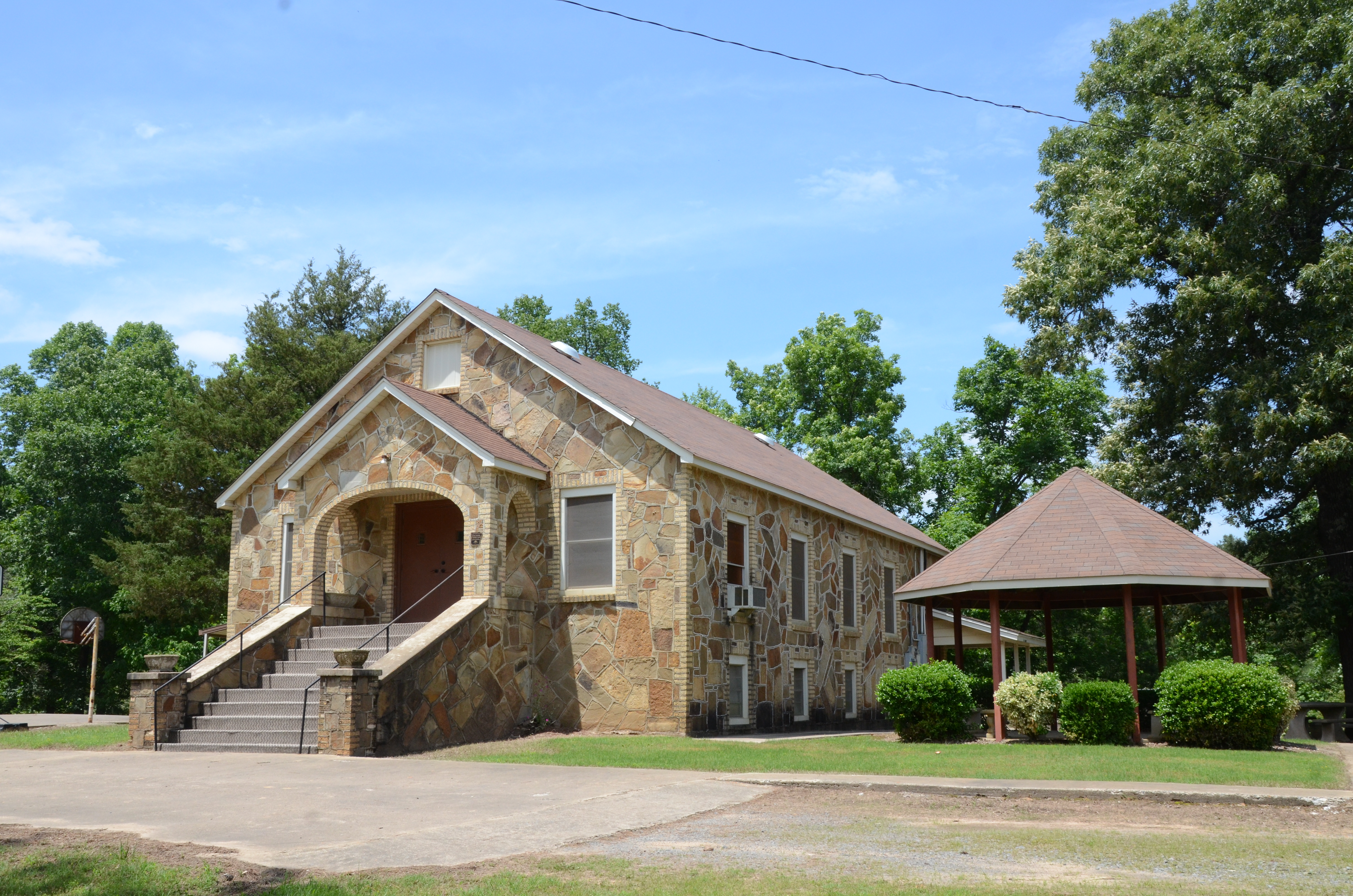

- Location within Arkansas Location within the United States
- Location: 274 Mallett Town Rd., Mallet Town, Arkansas
- Coordinates: 35°17′2″N 92°29′23″W
- Area: less than one acre
- Built: 1947
- Built by: Silas Owens, Sr.
- Architectural style: Bungalow/American craftsman
- MPS: Mixed Masonry Buildings of Silas Owens, Sr. MPS
- NRHP reference No.: 05000041
- Added to NRHP: February 15, 2005

The Mallettown United Methodist Church is a historic church at 274 Mallett Town Road in rural eastern Conway County, Arkansas. It is located in the hamlet of Mallet Town, at the northwest corner of County Road 54 and Town Circle. It is a single story masonry structure with a walkout basement, built out of fieldstone and cream-colored brick, both hallmarks of its builder, the regionally prominent African-American stonemason Silas Owens, Sr. Other elements of his style found on the building include the arched openings of the gabled entry porch. The church was built in 1947, when Owens's work was beginning reach wider notice in neighboring Faulkner County.

The building was listed on the National Register of Historic Places in 2005.

The Mallettown Church is no longer affiliated with the United Methodist Church. The church became Mallettown Community Church around 2020.

== See also ==
- National Register of Historic Places listings in Conway County, Arkansas
