= Art Scanlan House =

Historic house in Arkansas, United States

- U.S. National Register of Historic Places
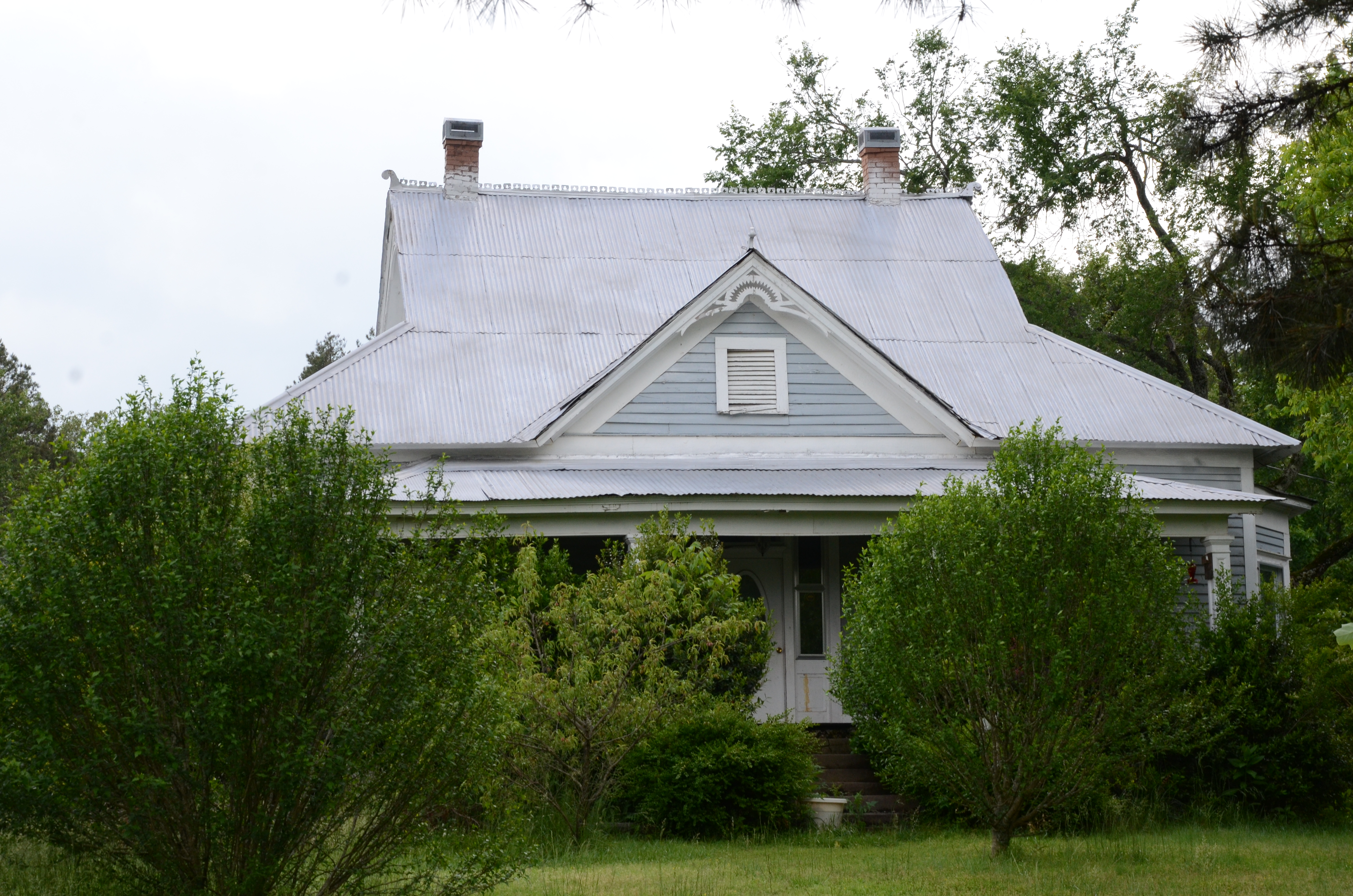

- Location within Arkansas Location within the United States
- Location: Record Loop, W. of US 65, Bee Branch, Arkansas
- Coordinates: 35°26′52″N 92°23′38″W
- Area: 2 acres (0.81 ha)
- Built: 1906
- NRHP reference No.: 99001355
- Added to NRHP: November 18, 1999

The Art Scanlan House is a historic house on Record Loop (County Road 1), just west of United States Route 65 in Bee Branch, Arkansas. It is a single-story wood-frame structure, with a gable-on-hip roof, weatherboard siding, and a foundation of concrete and fieldstone. It has modest Folk Victorian styling, with gingerbread cutouts in the gables, and a turned-spindle balustrade on the front porch. The house was built about 1907, and shares characteristics with the Collums-Baker House, suggesting both may have the same builder.

The house was listed on the National Register of Historic Places in 1999.

== See also ==
- National Register of Historic Places listings in Van Buren County, Arkansas
