= Van Buren County Road 2E Bridge =

- U.S. National Register of Historic Places
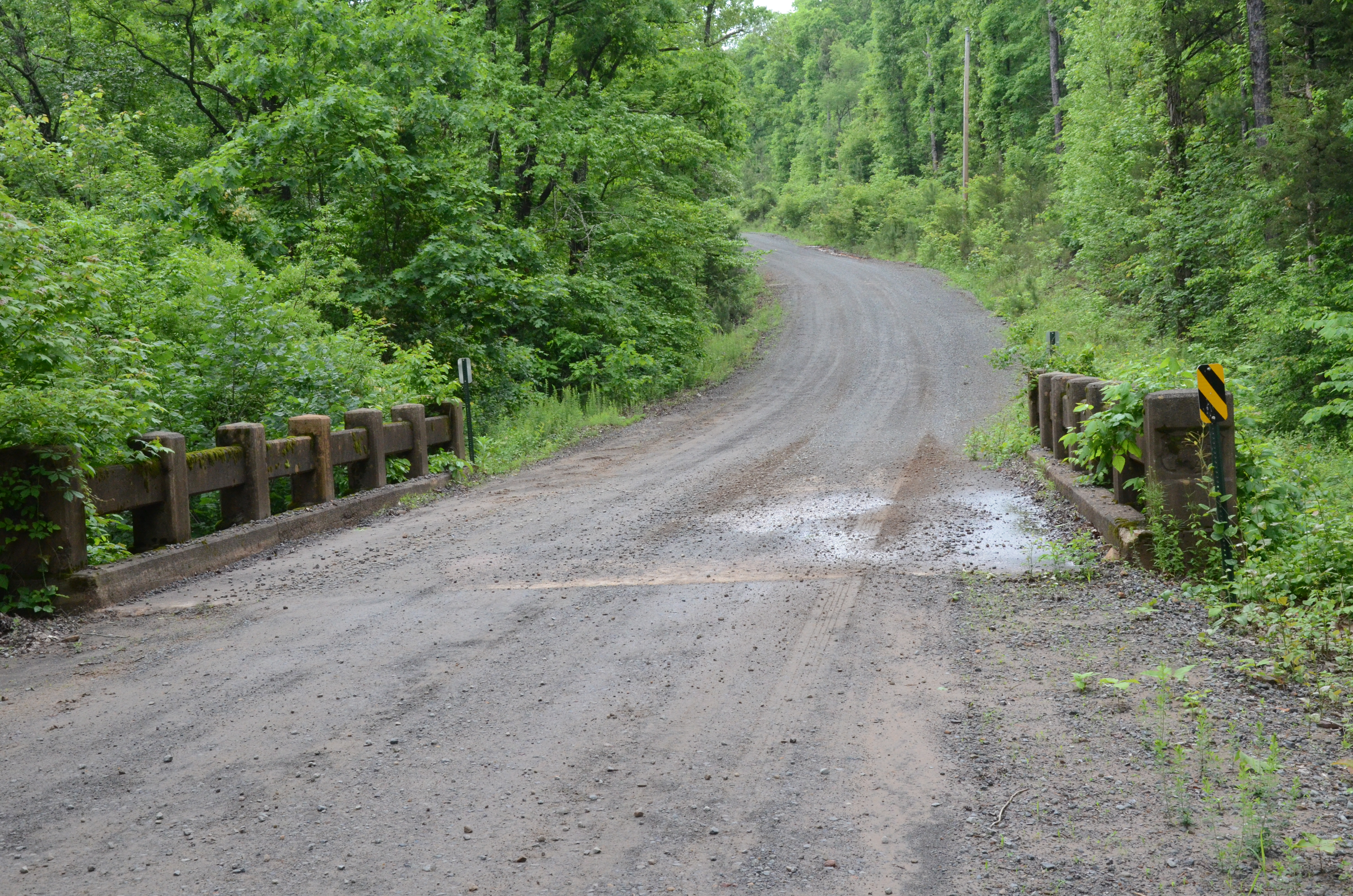

- Location within Arkansas Location within the United States
- Nearest city: Scotland, Arkansas
- Coordinates: 35°30′41″N 92°41′53″W
- Area: less than one acre
- Built: 1940
- Built by: Works Progress Administration
- Architectural style: Open Masonry Substructure
- MPS: Historic Bridges of Arkansas MPS
- NRHP reference No.: 95000570
- Added to NRHP: May 5, 1995

The Van Buren County Road 2E Bridge is a historic bridge in rural southwestern Van Buren County, Arkansas. It is a three-span open concrete masonry structure, with each span measuring 12 feet (3.7 m) in length, carrying County Road 2E across an unnamed tributary of Driver's Creek. The bridge rests on piers and abutments of stone and concrete, and has a roadway deck 19.9 feet (6.1 m) wide. It was built in 1940 with funding from the Works Progress Administration, and is a well-preserved example of a period concrete bridge.

The bridge was listed on the National Register of Historic Places in 1995.

== See also ==
- National Register of Historic Places listings in Van Buren County, Arkansas
- List of bridges on the National Register of Historic Places in Arkansas
