= Spears House (Greenbrier, Arkansas) =

Historic house in Arkansas, United States

- U.S. National Register of Historic Places
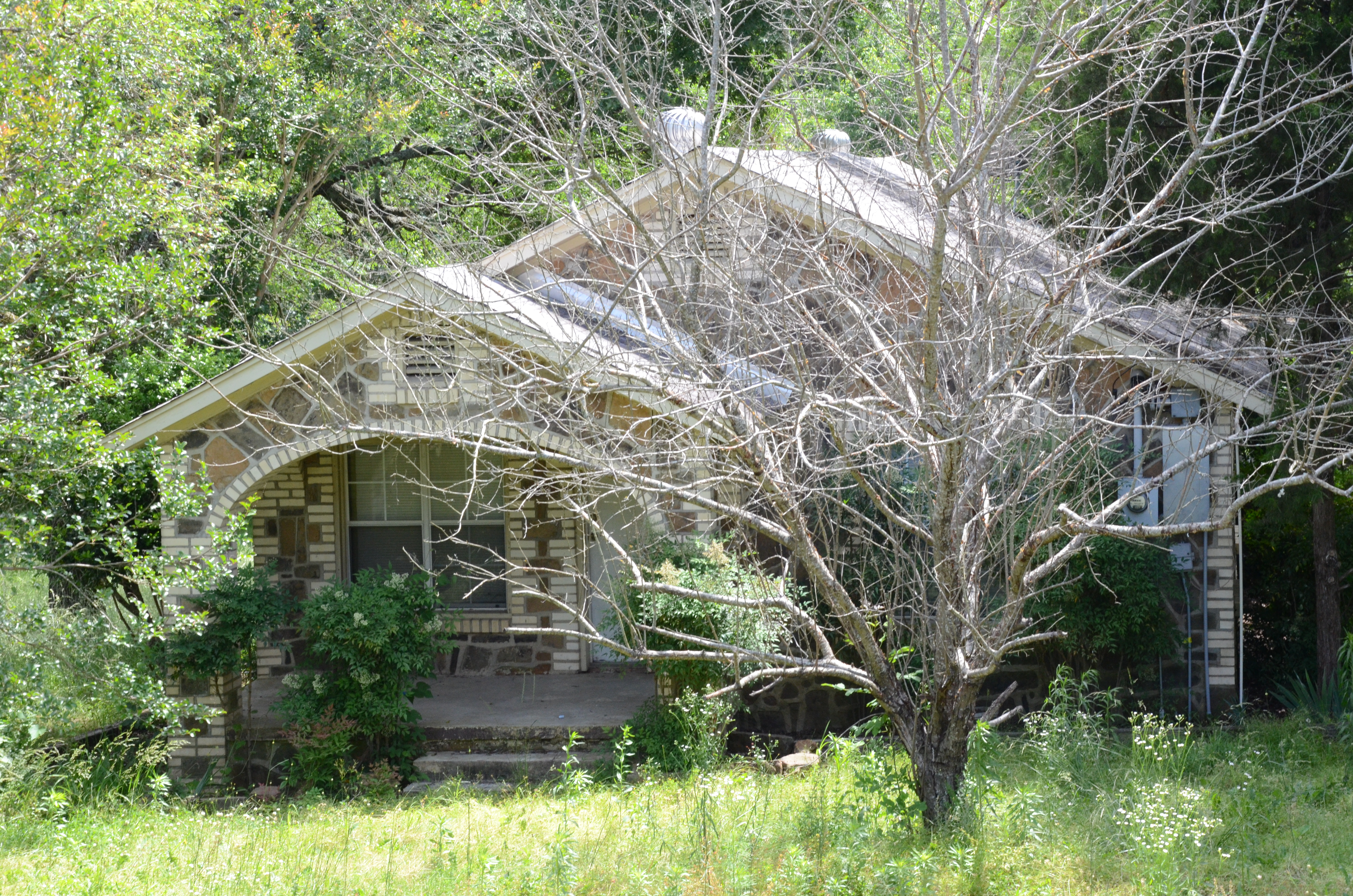

- Location within Arkansas Location within the United States
- Nearest city: Greenbrier, Arkansas
- Coordinates: 35°17′11″N 92°23′32″W
- Built: 1946
- Architect: Silas Owens, Sr.
- Architectural style: Bungalow/Craftsman
- MPS: Mixed Masonry Buildings of Silas Owens, Sr. MPS
- NRHP reference No.: 05000043
- Added to NRHP: February 15, 2005

Spears House is a historic house at 1235 United States Route 65 in Greenbrier, Arkansas. It is a single-story frame structure, faced in rock veneer with cream-colored brick trim. Built about 1946, it is basically Craftsman in style, with the stylistic of the regionally prominent African-American mason Silas Owens, Sr. seen in the use of cream-colored brick, arched openings, and herringbone stone patterns on the walls.

The house was listed on the National Register of Historic Places in 2005.

== See also ==
- National Register of Historic Places listings in Faulkner County, Arkansas
