= Edgemont Shelter =

Archaeological site in Arkansas, United States

- U.S. National Register of Historic Places
- Nearest city: Shirley, Arkansas
- Area: 0.1 acres (0.040 ha)
- MPS: Rock Art Sites in Arkansas TR
- NRHP reference No.: 82002146
- Added to NRHP: May 4, 1982

The Edgemont Shelter, also designated by the Smithsonian trinomial 3VB6, is a prehistoric rock art site in Van Buren County, Arkansas. Located on a bluff overlooking Greers Ferry Lake, it consists of a panel extensively painted with petroglyphs. The site has been dated to about 1500.

The site was listed on the National Register of Historic Places in 1982.

== See also ==
- Lynn Creek Shelter: NRHP-listed in Van Buren County
- National Register of Historic Places listings in Van Buren County, Arkansas
