= Lynn Creek Shelter =

Archaeological site in Arkansas, United States

- U.S. National Register of Historic Places
- Nearest city: Fairfield Bay, Arkansas
- Area: 0.1 acres (0.040 ha)
- MPS: Rock Art Sites in Arkansas TR
- NRHP reference No.: 78000634
- Added to NRHP: March 21, 1978

The Lynn Creek Shelter, designated by the Smithsonian trinomial 3BV19, is a prehistoric archaeological site in Van Buren County, Arkansas. Set on a bluff of the eastern Ozark Mountains, the site includes evidence of human habitation from about 8000 BCE to the historic contact period. The site has been disturbed by unauthorized activities.

The site was listed on the National Register of Historic Places in 1978.

== See also ==
- Edgemont Shelter: NRHP-listed in Van Buren County
- National Register of Historic Places listings in Van Buren County, Arkansas
