= Silas Owens Sr. =

American mason and builder

Silas Owens Sr. (1907 – April 4, 1960) was an African-American mason and builder in Arkansas who was noted for his distinctive style of construction. Many of the homes and buildings that Owens built are listed on the U.S. National Register of Historic Places primarily found in the Faulkner County, Arkansas area.

== Childhood ==
Born in Faulkner County in 1907, Owens was one of six sons of Haywood Owens. Owens, like many young boys at that time, worked on the family farm, picking and cultivating cotton. Haywood also would let his sons watch construction work, which Silas took in awe. Owens then received training in carpentry and drafting from a local man; however, his skill in rockwork was largely self-taught. Shortly thereafter, Owens branched out and started contracting.

== Works ==
His works include many listed on the National Register of Historic Places.

Works (credits) include:

- Melvin Chrisco House, 237 Alvin Brown Rd., Damascus, AR (Owens, Silas Sr.) NRHP-listed
- Church of Christ, AR 310, Guy, AR (Owens, Silas) NRHP-listed
- Earl and Oza Crownover-Brown House, 133 S. Broadway, Damascus, AR (Owens, Silas Sr.) NRHP-listed
- Eagle Guard Station, 11 mi. W of Townsend, Townsend, MT (Owens, Dick) NRHP-listed
- Richard and Mettie Ealy House, 280 Solomon Grove Rd., Twin Groves, AR (Owens, Silas Sr.) NRHP-listed
- First National Bank, 68 St. Francis St., Mobile, AL (Owens, Charles H.) NRHP-listed
- Dennis and Christine Garrison House, 105 Garrison Rd., Greenbrier, AR (Owens, Silas Sr.) NRHP-listed
- Charlie Hall House, 221 Old US 65, Twin Groves, AR (Owens, Silas Sr.) NRHP-listed
- E.E. Hooten House, 400 AR 25 N, Guy, AR (Owens, Silas Sr.) NRHP-listed
- Farris and Evelyn Langley House, 12 Langley Ln., Republican, AR (Owens, Silas Sr.) NRHP-listed
- Lee Service Station, 28 South Broadway, Damascus, AR (Owens, Silas) NRHP-listed
- Carl and Esther Lee House, 17493 US 65S, Damascus, AR (Owens, Silas Sr.) NRHP-listed
- Mallettown United Methodist Church, 274 Mallett Town Rd., Mallet Town, AR (Owens, Silas Sr.) NRHP-listed
- Merritt House, 139 N. Broadview, Greenbrier, AR (Owens, Silas Sr.) NRHP-listed
- S.D. Merritt House, 45 AR 25 N, Greenbrier, AR (Owens, Silas Sr.) NRHP-listed
- Mt. Zion Missionary Baptist Church, 249 AR 107, Enola, AR (Owens, Silas Sr., rock mason) NRHP-listed
- Silas Owens Sr. House, 157 Solomon Grove Rd., Twin Groves, AR (Owens, Silas Sr.) NRHP-listed
- Walter Patterson House, 1800 US 65N, Clinton, AR (Owens, Silas Sr.) NRHP-listed
- Quattlebaum–Pelletier House, 43 Ozark, Twin Groves, AR (Owens, Silas Sr.) NRHP-listed
- James and Jewell Salter House, 159 S. Broadview, Greenbrier, AR (Owens, Silas Sr.) NRHP-listed
- Sellers House, 89 Acklin Gap Rd., Conway, AR (Owens, Silas Sr.) NRHP-listed
- Solomon Grove Smith-Hughes Building, S of Co. Rd. 29, Twin Groves, AR (Owens, Silas Sr.) NRHP-listed
- Spears House, 1235 AR 65 N, Greenbrier, AR (Owens, Silas) NRHP-listed
- Terminal Warehouse, 211 E. Pleasant St., Baltimore, MD (Owens, Benjamin B.) NRHP-listed
- Tyler–Southerland House, 36 Southerland, Conway, AR (Owens, Silas Sr.) NRHP-listed
- Earl and Mildred Ward House, 1157 Mitchell St., Conway, AR (Owens, Silas Sr.) NRHP-listed
- Washburn House, 40 Battles Loop, Guy, AR (Owens, Silas Sr.) NRHP-listed
- Joe and Nina Webb House, 2945 Prince, Conway, AR (Owens, Silas Sr.) formerly NRHP-listed
- One or more works in Castleberry–Harrington Historic District, Castleberry Rd., Republican, AR (Owens, Silas Sr.) NRHP-listed
