= Sellers House (Conway, Arkansas) =

Historic house in Arkansas, United States

- U.S. National Register of Historic Places
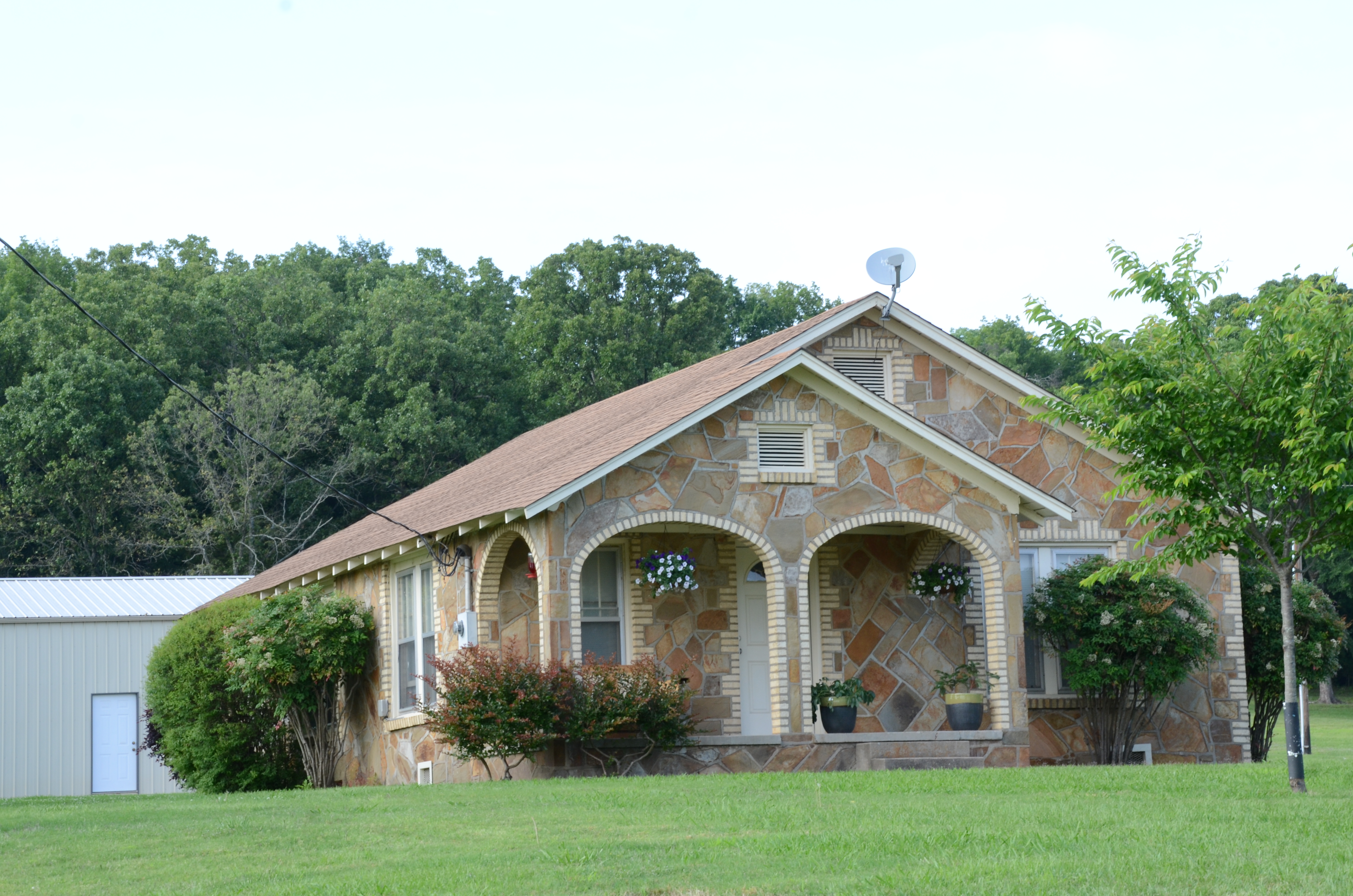

- Location within Arkansas Location within the United States
- Nearest city: 89 Acklin Gap Rd., near Conway, Arkansas
- Coordinates: 35°8′5″N 92°23′23″W
- Area: less than one acre
- Built: 1940
- Architect: Silas Owens, Sr.
- Architectural style: Bungalow/Craftsman
- MPS: Mixed Masonry Buildings of Silas Owens, Sr. MPS
- NRHP reference No.: 05000042
- Added to NRHP: February 15, 2005

The Sellers House is a historic house at 89 Acklin Gap in rural Faulkner County, Arkansas, northeast of Conway. It is a single-story masonry structure, with a gabled roof, fieldstone exterior, and cream-colored brick trim. It has a projecting front porch with arched openings, and its roof has Craftsman-style exposed rafter ends. The house was built about 1940 by Silas Owens, Sr., a noted regional master mason. This house exhibits his hallmarks, which include herringbone patterns in the stonework, cream-colored brick trim, and arched openings.

The house was listed on the National Register of Historic Places in 2005.

== See also ==
- National Register of Historic Places listings in Faulkner County, Arkansas
