= Sellers House (Beebe, Arkansas) =

Historic house in Arkansas, United States

- U.S. National Register of Historic Places
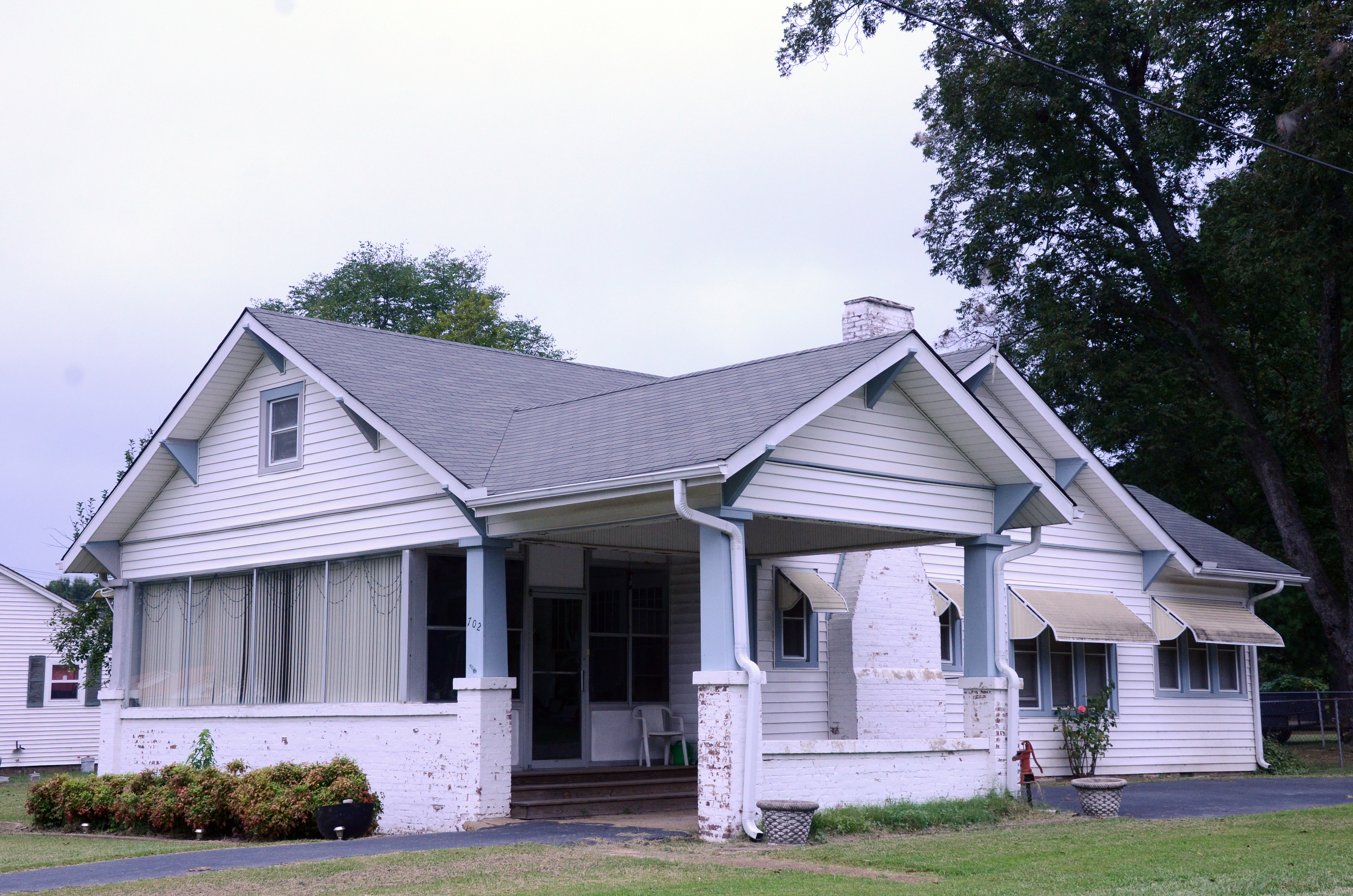

- Location within Arkansas Location within the United States
- Location: 702 W. Center St., Beebe, Arkansas
- Coordinates: 35°4′6″N 91°53′16″W
- Area: less than one acre
- Built: 1925
- Architectural style: Bungalow/Craftsman
- MPS: White County MPS
- NRHP reference No.: 91001261
- Added to NRHP: September 05, 1991

The Sellers House is a historic house at 702 West Center Street in Beebe, Arkansas, United States. It is a single story, with a gabled roof, weatherboard exterior, and brick foundation. Several cross gables project from the roof, including one acting as a porch and porte cochere. The gables show rafter ends in the Craftsman style. The house was built about 1925, and is a particularly picturesque example of the Craftsman style in the city.

The house was listed on the National Register of Historic Places in 1991.

== See also ==
- National Register of Historic Places listings in White County, Arkansas
