= Clinton, Arkansas =

- City
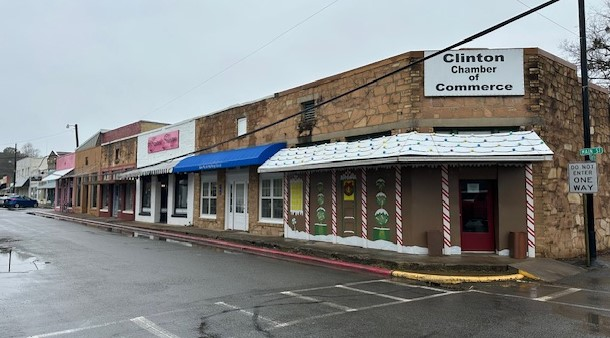
- Downtown Clinton in February 2025

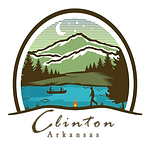
- Logo

- Location of Clinton in Van Buren County, Arkansas.
- Coordinates: 35°35′11″N 92°27′28″W
- Country: United States
- State: Arkansas
- County: Van Buren

Area
  - Total: 13.75 sq mi (35.61 km^{2})
  - Land: 13.46 sq mi (34.85 km^{2})
  - Water: 0.30 sq mi (0.77 km^{2})
- Elevation: 610 ft (190 m)

Population (2020)
  - Total: 2,509
  - Estimate (2025): 2,511 ▲
  - Density: 190/sq mi (72/km^{2})
- Time zone: UTC-6 (Central (CST))
  - Summer (DST): UTC-5 (CDT)
- ZIP code: 72031
- Area code: 501
- FIPS code: 05-14260
- GNIS feature ID: 2404076
- Website: www.clintonark.com

Clinton is a city in and the county seat of Van Buren County, Arkansas, United States. The population was 2,509 at the 2020 census, making it the most populous city in the county.

== History ==
The city was named for DeWitt Clinton, the New York governor who built the Erie Canal; he had also been a U.S. Senator from New York.

On February 5, 2008, an EF4 tornado struck Clinton during the 2008 Super Tuesday tornado outbreak, killing three people and destroying many homes and businesses, including a boat manufacturing facility.

== Geography ==
According to the United States Census Bureau, the city has a total area of 11.6 square miles (30 km^{2}), of which 11.4 square miles (30 km^{2}) is land and 0.2 square miles (0.52 km^{2}) (1.64%) is water.

Clinton is situated on the shore of the Archey Fork, a tributary of the Upper Little Red River which flows into Greers Ferry Lake. This body of water is known for its rich and diverse fish habitat and recreational uses. A channelization project in 1982 following a major flood event has recently been re-engineered by The Nature Conservancy in cooperation with city officials and corporate sponsors. The multi-phase restoration project has witnessed the installation of a cantilevered stream bed, bank stabilization, and habitat regeneration. The restoration is now part of the city's downtown park and trail system.

== Demographics ==
Historical population
Census	Pop.	Note	%±
1880	166		—
1890	176		6.0%
1900	297		68.8%
1940	915		—
1950	853		−6.8%
1960	744		−12.8%
1970	1,029		38.3%
1980	1,284		24.8%
1990	2,213		72.4%
2000	2,283		3.2%
2010	2,602		14.0%
2020	2,509		−3.6%
2025 (est.)	2,511	▲	0.1%
U.S. Decennial Census; 2014 Estimate

=== 2020 census ===
As of the 2020 census, Clinton had a population of 2,509. The median age was 45.0 years. 21.2% of residents were under the age of 18 and 24.0% were 65 years of age or older. For every 100 females, there were 94.6 males, and for every 100 females age 18 and over, there were 90.6 males age 18 and over.

0.0% of residents lived in urban areas, while 100.0% lived in rural areas.

There were 1,105 households in Clinton, of which 24.3% had children under the age of 18 living in them. Family households accounted for 55.0% of all households (about 608 families). Of all households, 41.7% were married-couple households, 20.2% were households with a male householder and no spouse or partner present, and 33.6% were households with a female householder and no spouse or partner present. About 38.9% of all households were made up of individuals, and 23.6% had someone living alone who was 65 years of age or older.

There were 1,290 housing units, of which 14.3% were vacant. The homeowner vacancy rate was 2.3% and the rental vacancy rate was 9.4%.

Clinton racial composition
Race	Number	Percentage
White (non-Hispanic)	2,088	83.22%
Black or African American (non-Hispanic)	24	0.96%
Native American	19	0.76%
Asian	16	0.64%
Other/Mixed	134	5.34%
Hispanic or Latino	228	9.09%

=== 2000 census ===
As of the census of 2000, there were 2,283 people, 1,007 households, and 626 families residing in the city. The population density was 200.3 inhabitants per square mile (77.3/km^{2}). There were 1,123 housing units at an average density of 98.5 per square mile (38.0/km^{2}). The racial makeup of the city was 95.71% White, 0.04% Black or African American, 0.74% Native American, 0.13% Asian, 1.31% from other races, and 2.06% from two or more races. 2.67% of the population were Hispanic or Latino of any race.

There were 1,007 households, out of which 26.1% had children under the age of 18 living with them, 49.7% were married couples living together, 8.8% had a female householder with no husband present, and 37.8% were non-families. 35.5% of all households were made up of individuals, and 20.6% had someone living alone who was 65 years of age or older. The average household size was 2.22 and the average family size was 2.87.

In the city, the population was spread out, with 23.1% under the age of 18, 7.5% from 18 to 24, 23.8% from 25 to 44, 23.6% from 45 to 64, and 22.0% who were 65 years of age or older. The median age was 42 years. For every 100 females, there were 90.3 males. For every 100 females age 18 and over, there were 85.3 males.

The median income for a household in the city was $22,206, and the median income for a family was $30,792. Males had a median income of $24,750 versus $19,152 for females. The per capita income for the city was $15,514. About 15.7% of families and 17.9% of the population were below the poverty line, including 21.7% of those under age 18 and 16.7% of those age 65 or over.

== Arts and culture ==
The National Championship Chuckwagon Races are held annually at the Bar of Ranch in Clinton. The event is a major tourist attraction drawing many thousands to the area each Labor Day weekend with rodeo and futurity events, auctions, live music performances, and the grand finale Snowy River race.

The Van Buren County Courthouse in Clinton is listed on the state historic registry.

== Education ==
Public education for elementary and secondary students is available from the Clinton School District with students graduating from Clinton High School. Clinton High is rated by U.S. News & World Report at #36 out of 292 high schools in Arkansas.

== Infrastructure ==
Intercity bus service to the city is provided by Jefferson Lines.

== Notable people ==
- Karen R. Baker, Associate Justice of the Arkansas Supreme Court
- James E. Burnett, National Transportation Safety Board Chairman, and Special Justice of the Arkansas Supreme Court
- Bobby Burnett, Arkansas Razorbacks and Buffalo Bills running back, AFL Rookie of the Year for 1966
- Opie Cates, swing band leader and radio actor
- Clifton Clowers, World War I veteran, farmer, and inspiration for the Merle Kilgore song "Wolverton Mountain."
- John Hargis, 1996 Olympic Gold Medalist swimmer is a 1993 Clinton High School graduate.
- Monica Potts, author of the book, “The Forgotten Girls,” which is, in part, about her childhood in Clinton.
- Jack Whillock, Arkansas Razorbacks and Major League Baseball pitcher

== In popular culture ==
In 2023, Monica Potts wrote in The Atlantic that "Almost everyone goes to an evangelical church".

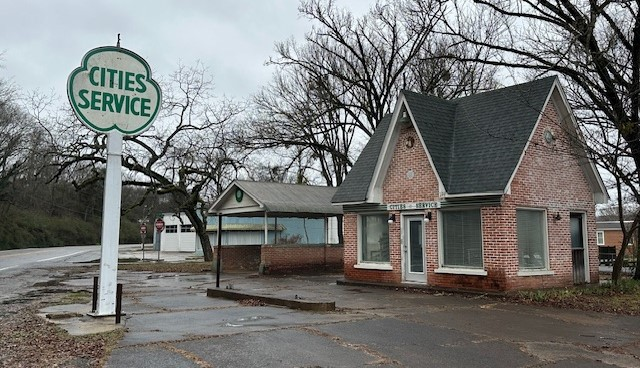
Walter Patterson Filling Station, Clinton AR, 2-2025

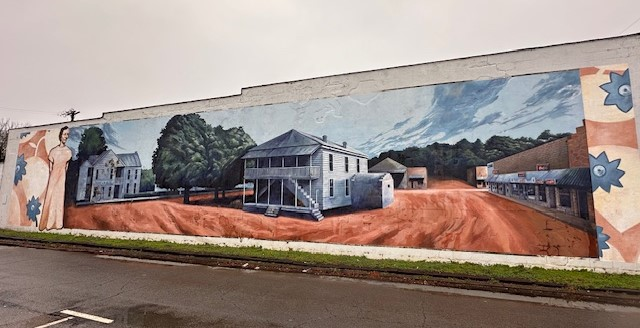
Clinton AR Mural, 2-2025

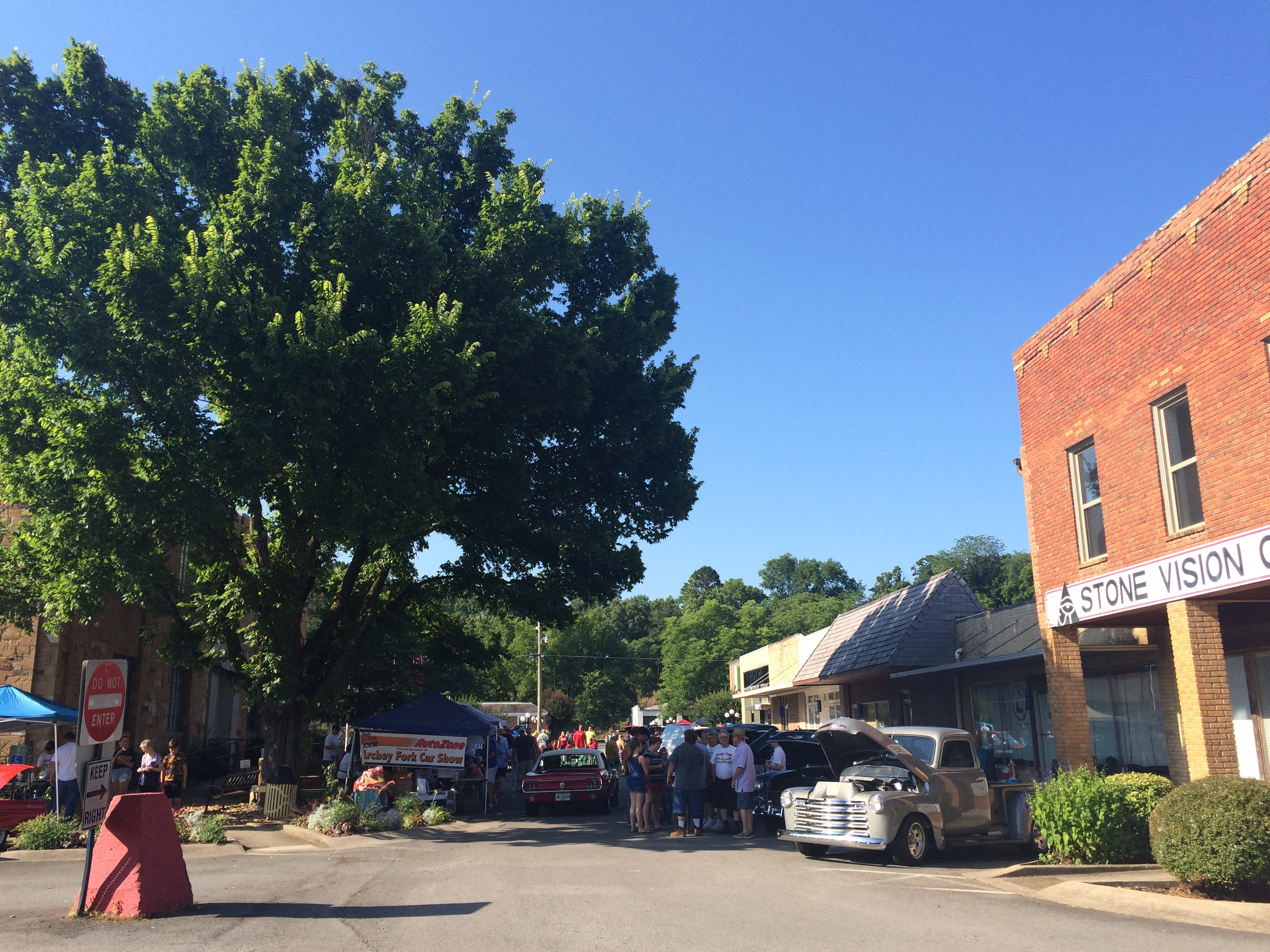
Downtown Clinton

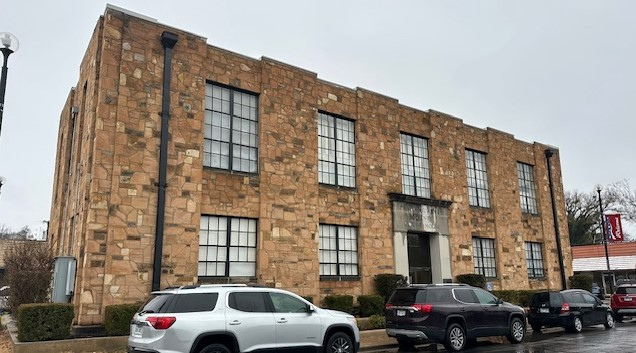
Van Buren County Courthouse, Clinton AR, 2-2025

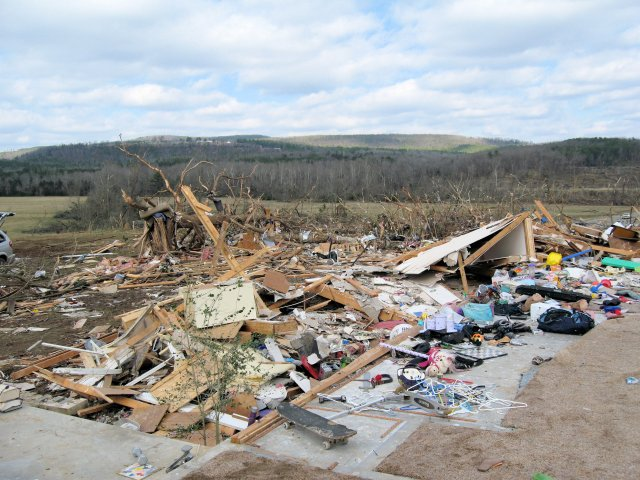
Tornado damage to a house in Clinton, 2008
