= Damascus, Arkansas =

- City
- Location of Damascus in Faulkner County and Van Buren County, Arkansas.
- Coordinates: 35°22′15″N 92°24′30″W
- Country: United States
- State: Arkansas
- Counties: Faulkner, Van Buren
- Incorporated: July 15, 1966

Government
  - Type: Mayor-Council
  - Mayor: Terry "TJ" Jones
  - Town Council: Gene Byrd; Brian Edwards; Gilbert Lewis; Justin Moore; Jackie Williams
  - Recorder/Treasurer: Wendi Payne
  - Town Clerk: Pamela Mahan

Area
  - Total: 1.86 sq mi (4.82 km^{2})
  - Land: 1.86 sq mi (4.82 km^{2})
  - Water: 0 sq mi (0.00 km^{2})
- Elevation: 696 ft (212 m)

Population (2020)
  - Total: 382
  - Estimate (2025): 396 ▲
  - Density: 205/sq mi (79.2/km^{2})
- Time zone: UTC-6 (Central (CST))
  - Summer (DST): UTC-5 (CDT)
- ZIP code: 72039
- Area code: 501
- FIPS code: 05-17290
- GNIS ID: 2406351
- Website: Town of Damascus

Damascus is a town in Faulkner and Van Buren counties of central Arkansas, United States. The population was 382 as of the 2020 Census.

== History ==
Damascus is a town located in the Ozark foothills on a plateau surrounded by clear streams along U.S. Highway 65 on the county line between Faulkner and Van Buren counties. It is most known for its proximity to the Titan II missile base that operated from 1963 until 1980, when a missile explosion killed one person and injured twenty-one. Damascus is home to three Baptist churches, a Church of Christ that was built in 1917, and a Methodist church that was built in 1947.

Damascus is also near the Gus Blass Scout Reservation, a Boy Scout Camp of 3,000 acres maintained by the Quapaw Area Council.

=== Broken Arrow Incident ===
Construction began on a Titan II missile base north of Damascus in 1961; the site became active on December 18, 1963. During routine maintenance in a Titan II silo, an Air Force repairman dropped a heavy wrench socket, which rolled off a work platform and fell toward the bottom of the silo. The socket bounced and struck the missile, causing a leak from a pressurized fuel tank. The missile complex and the surrounding area were evacuated and a team of specialists was called in from Little Rock Air Force Base, the missile's main support base. About 8 1/2 hours after the initial puncture, fuel vapors within the silo ignited and exploded. The explosion fatally injured one member of the team. Twenty-one other USAR personnel were injured. The missile's re-entry vehicle, which contained a nuclear warhead, was recovered intact. There was no radioactive contamination.

Damascus was the site of a nuclear "Broken Arrow" incident on September 18–19, 1980 when a Titan II ICBM exploded 3.3 miles (5.3 km) NNE of the town, although no radiation was spread as a result of the explosion. An extensive description of the Damascus accident can be found in Eric Schlosser's 2013 book: Command and Control: Nuclear Weapons, the Damascus Accident, and the Illusion of Safety.

== Geography ==
According to the United States Census Bureau, the town has a total area of 5.0 square kilometers (1.9 mi^{2}), all land.

== Demographics ==
Historical population
Census	Pop.	Note	%±
1970	255		—
1980	307		20.4%
1990	246		−19.9%
2000	306		24.4%
2010	382		24.8%
2020	382		0.0%
2025 (est.)	396	▲	3.7%
U.S. Decennial Census

Damascus's portion within Faulkner County is in the northernmost part of the Little Rock–North Little Rock–Conway Metropolitan Statistical Area.

At the 2000 census there were 306 people, 137 households, and 90 families in the town. The population density was 61.2/km^{2} (159/mi^{2}). There were 157 housing units at an average density of 31.4/km^{2} (81/mi^{2}). The racial makeup of the town was 97.71% White, 0.98% Black or African American, 0.33% Native American, and 0.98% from two or more races. 1.31% of the population were Hispanic or Latino of any race. Of the 137 households 26.3% had children under the age of 18 living with them, 53.3% were married couples living together, 7.3% had a female householder with no husband present, and 34.3% were non-families. 30.7% of households were one person and 19.0% were one person aged 65 or older. The average household size was 2.23 and the average family size was 2.81.

The age distribution was 21.2% under the age of 18, 5.9% from 18 to 24, 25.2% from 25 to 44, 21.9% from 45 to 64, and 25.8% 65 or older. The median age was 44 years. For every 100 females, there were 96.2 males. For every 100 females age 18 and over, there were 88.3 males.

The median household income was $28,977 and the median family income was $38,750. Males had a median income of $28,214 versus $16,458 for females. The per capita income for the town was $18,342. About 1.3% of families and 8.0% of the population were below the poverty line, including none of those under the age of eighteen and 22.2% of those sixty five or over.

== Education ==
Public education for elementary and secondary school students in all parts of Damascus is available from the South Side School District.

== Libraries ==
The city is served by the Faulkner-Van Buren Regional Library System, a two county library system formed in 1954. Damascus Library

== Notable person ==
- Kim Hammer, Republican member of the Arkansas House of Representatives from District 28 since 2011; raised in Damascus
