= Brown House =

Brown House may refer to:

== United States ==
(sorted by state then city/town)

- Dr. A.M. Brown House, Birmingham, Alabama
- Brown–Proctor House, Scottsboro, Alabama
- Brown House (Bald Knob, Arkansas)
- Brown House (Conway, Arkansas)
- Earl and Oza Crownover-Brown House, Damascus, Arkansas
- W. C. Brown House, Hot Springs, Arkansas
- Floyd B. Brown House, Pine Bluff, Arkansas
- Alfrey-Brown House, Siloam Springs, Arkansas
- Dr. Charles Fox Brown House, Van Buren, Arkansas
- Joe Brown House and Farmstead, White County, Arkansas
- Duff T. Brown House, Kingman, Arizona
- Brown House (Yuma, Arizona)
- Jackson Fay Brown House, Dixon, California
- Ennis House, Los Angeles, California, also known as the Ennis-Brown House
- Molly Brown House, Denver, Colorado
- David W. Brown House, Englewood, Colorado
- Lawrence Brown House, Bartow, Florida
- Brown House (McDonough, Georgia), listed on the National Register of Historic Places (NRHP)
- Roger Brown Home and Studio, Chicago, Illinois, listed on the NRHP
- David Brown House, Ohio County, Indiana
- Blankenship-Hodges-Brown House, Ray Township, Indiana
- Brown-Kercheval House, Rockport, Indiana
- Corydon Brown House, Dakota City, Iowa
- Brown House (Hodgenville, Kentucky), listed on the NRHP
- Theodore Brown House, St. Matthews, Kentucky
- Brown House (Brownville, Maine)
- Brown-Pilsbury Double House, Bucksport, Maine
- Harrison B. Brown House, Portland, Maine
- Moses Brown House, Eldersburg, Maryland
- Jeremiah Brown House and Mill Site, Rising Sun, Maryland
- Mercer Brown House, Rising Sun, Maryland
- Colonel Roger Brown House, Concord, Massachusetts
- Reuben Brown House, Concord, Massachusetts
- Austin Brown House, Hamilton, Massachusetts
- Brown House (Hamilton, Massachusetts)
- Brown–Maynard House, Lowell, Massachusetts
- Brown–Hodgkinson House, Quincy, Massachusetts
- Brown House (Rehoboth, Massachusetts)
- Brown–Stow House, Stow, Massachusetts
- E. Brown House, Uxbridge, Massachusetts
- Brown-Price House, Lansing, Michigan, listed on the NRHP
- Joseph Brown House Ruins, Renville County, Minnesota
- Robert A. Brown House, Cass County, Missouri
- Doerr–Brown House, Perryville, Missouri
- Thompson-Brown-Sandusky House, St. Joseph, Missouri
- Hugh H. Brown House, Nye County, Nevada
- Brown–Ellis House, Highland, New York
- Luke Brown House, Parishville, New York
- Alexander Brown House, Syracuse, New York
- Brown-Graves House and Brown's Store, Caswell County, North Carolina
- Wiley and Jane Vann Brown House, Hertford County, North Carolina
- Garrett-Wiggins-Brown House, Tarboro, North Carolina
- Brown-Cowles House and Cowles Law Office, Wilkesboro, North Carolina
- Stephen William Brown Stone House, Stutsman County, North Dakota
- Jim Brown House, Peninsula, Ohio
- Charles and Martha Brown House, Marion County, Oregon, listed on the NRHP
- Childs–Brown House, Pawtucket, Rhode Island
- Morris Brown House, Providence, Rhode Island
- Nightingale–Brown House, Providence, Rhode Island
- Jennings-Brown House, Bennettsville, South Carolina
- Brown-Evans House, Mobridge, South Dakota
- A.R. Brown House, Erwin, Tennessee, NRHP-listed
- Hamilton-Brown House, Franklin, Tennessee
- Brown House (Ooltewah, Tennessee), listed on the NRHP
- Brown-Daly-Horne House, Pulaski, Tennessee
- Brown-Mann House, McGregor, Texas, formerly listed on the NRHP
- Brooks–Brown House, Franklin County, Virginia
- Brown–Koerner House, Loudoun County, Virginia
- Williams–Brown House and Store, Salem, Virginia
- Danforth Brown House, Brooke County, West Virginia
- Dr. Flavius Brown House, Summersville, West Virginia
- Brown-Sewell House, Stoughton, Wisconsin, listed on the NRHP
- Herbert Hoover's Presidential Brown House at Rapidan Camp

== Elsewhere ==
- Brown House, Munich, Germany, the headquarters of the former Nazi Party in Germany

== See also ==
- George Brown House (disambiguation)
- James Brown House (disambiguation)
- John Brown House (disambiguation)
- Samuel Brown House (disambiguation)
- Thomas Brown House (disambiguation)
- William Brown House (disambiguation)
