= James Brown House =

James Brown House may refer to:

in the United States (by state)

- James Brown House (Riverdale, Iowa), in Scott County, listed on the National Register of Historic Places (NRHP)
- James Brown House (St. Matthews, Kentucky), listed on the National Register of Historic Places in Jefferson County, Kentucky
- James B. Brown House, Hannibal, Ralls County, Missouri, NRHP-listed
- James Brown House (Manhattan), New York City, NRHP-listed
- Jim Brown House, Peninsula, Summit County, Ohio, NRHP-listed

== See also ==
- Brown House (disambiguation)
