= John Brown House =

John Brown House, or John Brown Farmhouse or variations, may refer to:

in the United States

(by state)

- John Stanford Brown House, Walnut Grove, California, listed on the NRHP in Sacramento County, California
- John Brown Stone Warehouse, Fort Wayne, Indiana
- John Brown Cabin, Osawatomie, Kansas
- John C. Brown House, Mulberry, Kentucky, listed on the NRHP
- The Gothic House, Portland, Maine, also known as the John J. Brown House
- John Brown IV House, Swansea, Massachusetts
- John Brown Farm and Gravesite, Lake Placid, New York
- John Brown House, a historic house property owned by the Summit County Historical Society of Akron, Ohio
- John Hartness Brown House, Cleveland Heights, Ohio, listed on the NRHP
- John Brown Farmhouse (Hudson, Ohio), listed on the NRHP
- John and Amelia Brown Farmhouse, Brownsville, Oregon, listed on the NRHP
- John Brown House (Chambersburg, Pennsylvania)
- John Brown Tannery Site, New Richmond, Pennsylvania
- John Brown House (Providence, Rhode Island)
- John R. Brown House, McKinney, Texas, listed on the NRHP
- John M. Brown House, Washington, Texas, listed on the NRHP

== See also ==
- Brown House (disambiguation)
