= George M. Brown =

George M. Brown may refer to:

- George Mackay Brown (1921–1996), Scottish poet, author, and dramatist
- George M. Brown (judge) (1864–1934), American attorney and judge in Oregon
- George Mackenzie Brown (1869–1946), Member of Parliament
- Sir George Malcolm Brown (1925–1997), English geologist
- Sir George McLaren Brown (1865–1939), Canadian railway administrator
- George Mortimer Brown (1842–1894), American attorney builder of the George M. Brown House on the National Register of Historic Places in Utah
