= Greeson-Cone House =

Historic house in Arkansas, United States

- U.S. National Register of Historic Places
- U.S. Historic district – Contributing property
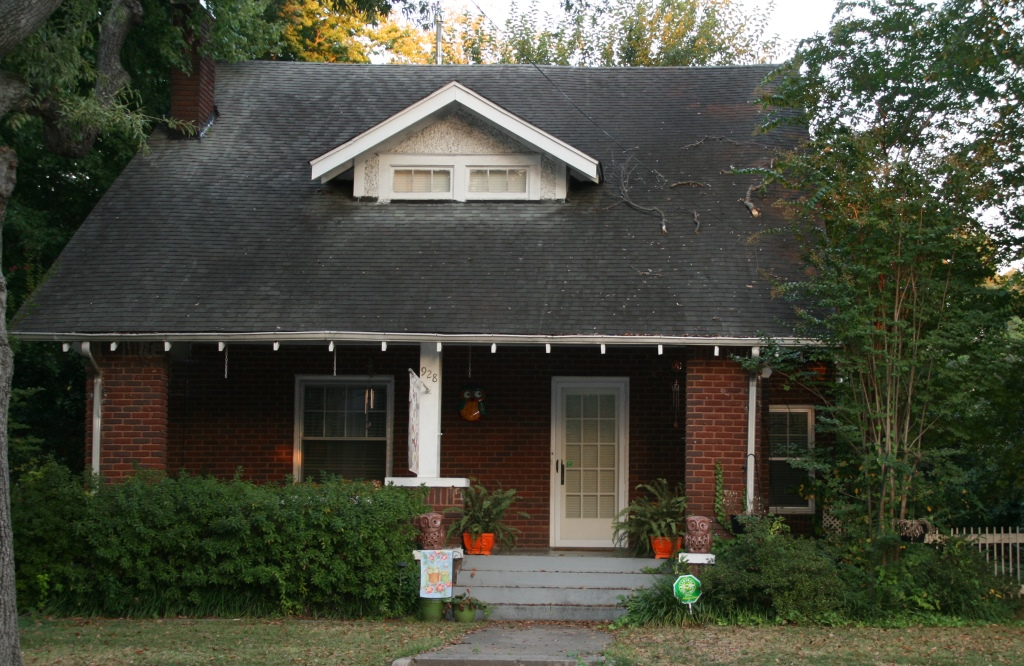

- Location within Arkansas Location within the United States
- Location: 928 Center St., Conway, Arkansas
- Coordinates: 35°5′28″N 92°26′41″W
- Area: less than one acre
- Built: 1921
- Architectural style: Bungalow/craftsman
- Part of: Robinson Historic District (ID00001645)
- NRHP reference No.: 95001094

Significant dates
- Added to NRHP: September 7, 1995
- Designated CP: January 29, 2001

The Greeson-Cone House is a historic house at 928 Center Street in Conway, Arkansas. It is a 1 1/2-story wood-frame structure with a brick exterior. It has a side-gable roof, whose front extends across a porch supported by brick piers near the corners and a square wooden post near the center. The roof has exposed rafter ends, and a gabled dormer in the Craftsman style. Built in 1920–21, it is a fine local example of Craftsman architecture.

The house was listed on the National Register of Historic Places in 1995.

== See also ==
- National Register of Historic Places listings in Faulkner County, Arkansas
