= George Brown House =

George Brown House may refer to:

in Canada

- George Brown House (Toronto)

in the United States

- George Brown Mansion, Chesterton, Indiana, listed on the NRHP in Porter County, Indiana
- George T. Brown House, Junction City, Kansas, listed on the NRHP in Geary County, Kansas
- George I. Brown House, Nicholasville, Kentucky, listed on the NRHP in Jessamine County, Kentucky
- George M. Brown House, Provo, Utah, listed on the NRHP in Utah County, Utah
- George McKesson Brown Estate-Coindre Hall, Huntington Station, New York, listed on the NRHP in Suffolk County, New York
