= Harton House =

Historic house in Arkansas, United States

- U.S. National Register of Historic Places
- U.S. Historic district – Contributing property
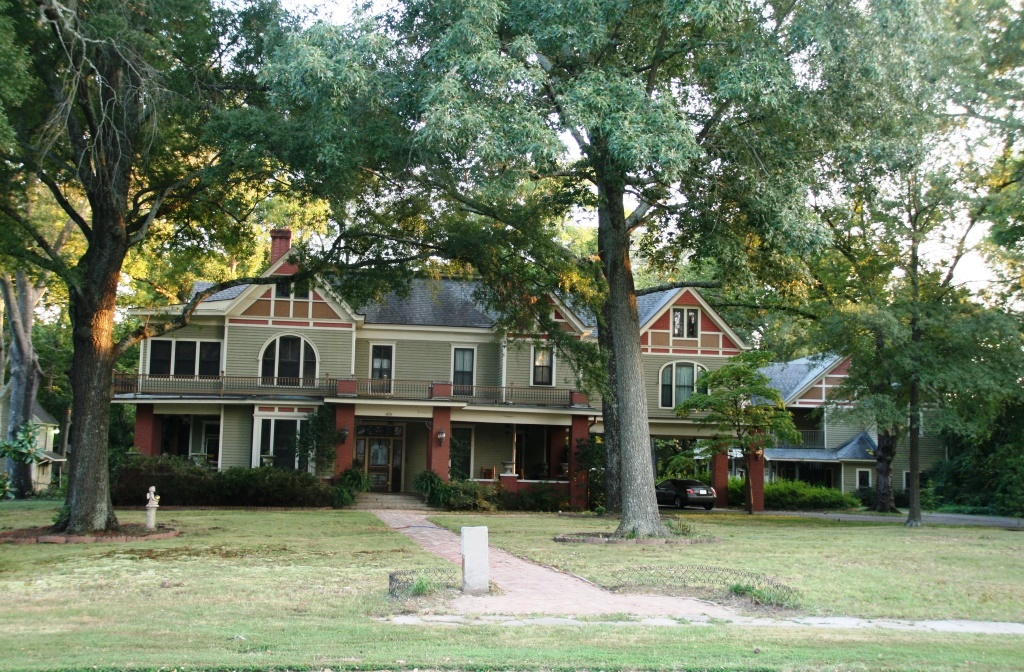

- Location within Arkansas Location within the United States
- Location: 1821 Robinson Ave., Conway, Arkansas
- Coordinates: 35°5′16″N 92°26′56″W
- Area: 4 acres (1.6 ha)
- Built: 1890
- Built by: George Rice
- Architect: Flosrrie Harton
- Architectural style: Queen Anne, Colonial Revival
- Part of: Robinson Historic District (ID00001645)
- NRHP reference No.: 79000438

Significant dates
- Added to NRHP: May 25, 1979
- Designated CP: January 29, 2001

The Harton House is a historic house at 1821 Robinson Avenue in Conway, Arkansas. It is a large, irregularly massed 2 1/2-story wood-frame house with a hip roof and clapboard siding. The roof is studded with cross gables exhibiting a half-timbered appearance, and a single-story porch wraps around the front and side, supported by brick piers. Built in 1890, the house is a distinctive combination of Queen Anne and Colonial Revival styling. It was built for D. O. Harton, a prominent local businessman.

The house was listed on the National Register of Historic Places in 1979.

== See also ==
- National Register of Historic Places listings in Faulkner County, Arkansas
