= Robinson Historic District =

Historic district in Arkansas, United States

- U.S. National Register of Historic Places
- U.S. Historic district
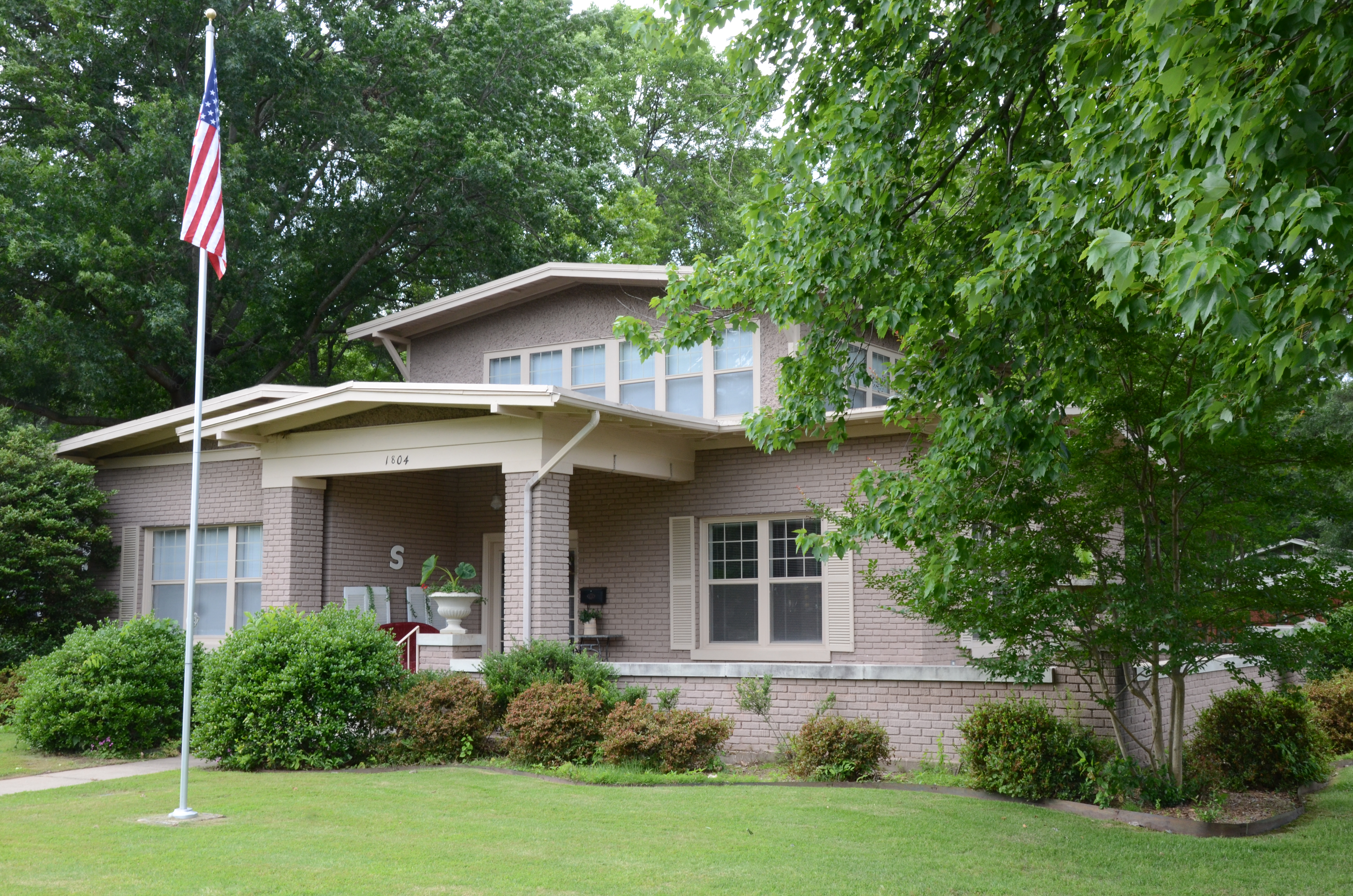

- Location within Arkansas Location within the United States
- Location: Roughly bounded by Ash, Davis, Faulkner, and Watkins Sts., and Robinson Ave., Conway, Arkansas
- Coordinates: 35°5′23″N 92°26′54″W
- Area: 103 acres (42 ha)
- Architect: Thompson, Charles L.
- Architectural style: Queen Anne, Colonial Revival, et al.
- NRHP reference No.: 00001645
- Added to NRHP: January 29, 2001

The Robinson Historic District encompasses the oldest residential neighborhood of Conway, Arkansas. It is located just west of the city's downtown business district, and is bounded on the east by Faulkner Street, the south by Robinson Avenue, the west by Watkins Street, and the north by Ash, Caldwell, and Davis Streets. It contains a cross-section of residential architectural styles covering the city's development between 1890 and 1950. The district is named for Asa P. Robinson, Conway's founder.

The district was listed on the National Register of Historic Places in 2001. Properties within the district that were previously listed include the Brown House, the First United Methodist Church, the O.L. Dunaway House, the Greeson-Cone House, the Harton House, and the S.G. Smith House.

== See also ==
- National Register of Historic Places listings in Faulkner County, Arkansas
