= Thomas Brown House =

Thomas Brown House may refer to:

- Thomas Brown House (Franklin, Tennessee)
- Thomas Brown House (Inwood, West Virginia)
- Col. Thomas Brown House, Preston County, West Virginia

== See also ==
- Brown House (disambiguation)
