= West Richwoods Church & School =

Historic church in Arkansas, United States

- U.S. National Register of Historic Places
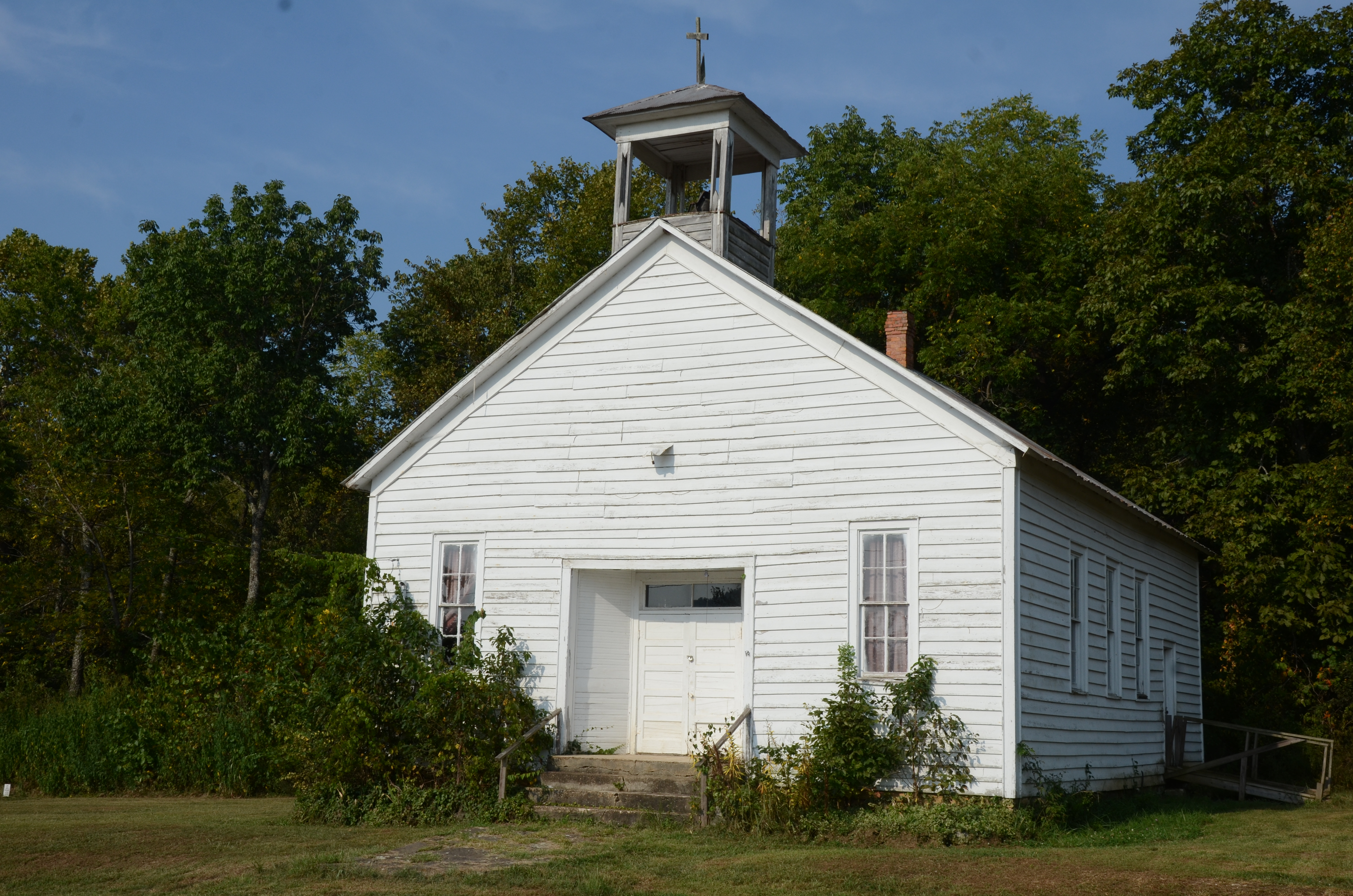

- Location within Arkansas Location within the United States
- Location: AR 9, West Richwoods, Arkansas
- Coordinates: 35°49′35″N 92°10′19″W
- Area: less than one acre
- Built: 1921
- Architect: Albert Huebbler
- Architectural style: Rectangular Plan
- MPS: Stone County MRA
- NRHP reference No.: 85002205
- Added to NRHP: September 17, 1985

The West Richwoods Church & School is a historic multifunction building on Arkansas Highway 9 in West Richwoods, Arkansas, a hamlet in rural central Stone County. It is a vernacular rectangular frame structure, with a gable roof topped by a small open belfry. The front facade is symmetrically arranged, with a recessed double-door entrance flanked by windows. Built about 1921, it is one of the county's few surviving early schoolhouses.

The building was listed on the National Register of Historic Places in 1985.

== See also ==
- National Register of Historic Places listings in Stone County, Arkansas
