= Samuel Brown House =

Samuel Brown House may refer to:

- Samuel Brown House (West Richwoods, Arkansas), listed on the National Register of Historic Places in Stone County, Arkansas
- Samuel Brown House (Roachdale, Indiana), listed on the National Register of Historic Places in Putnam County, Indiana
- Samuel A. Brown House, Newton, Kansas, listed on the NRHP in Kansas
- Samuel N. Brown House, Dayton, Ohio, listed on the NRHP in Ohio
- P. Samuel Brown House, Fulton, Ohio, listed on the NRHP in Ohio
- Sam Brown House, Gervais, Oregon, listed on the NRHP in Oregon
