= Harrison Bird Brown =

American painter

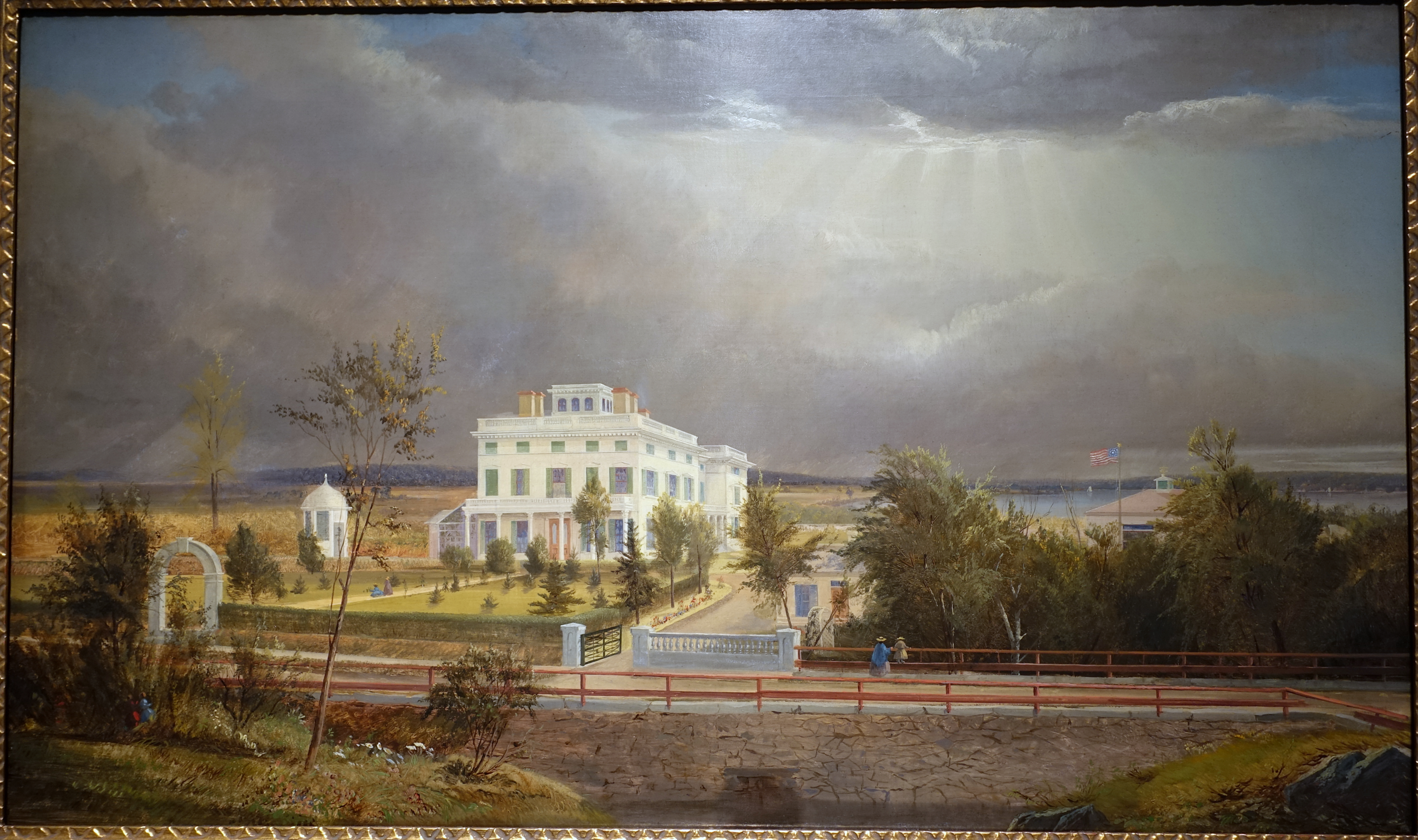
View of Captain John Brown Coyle's House, by Harrison Bird Brown, 1858-1861

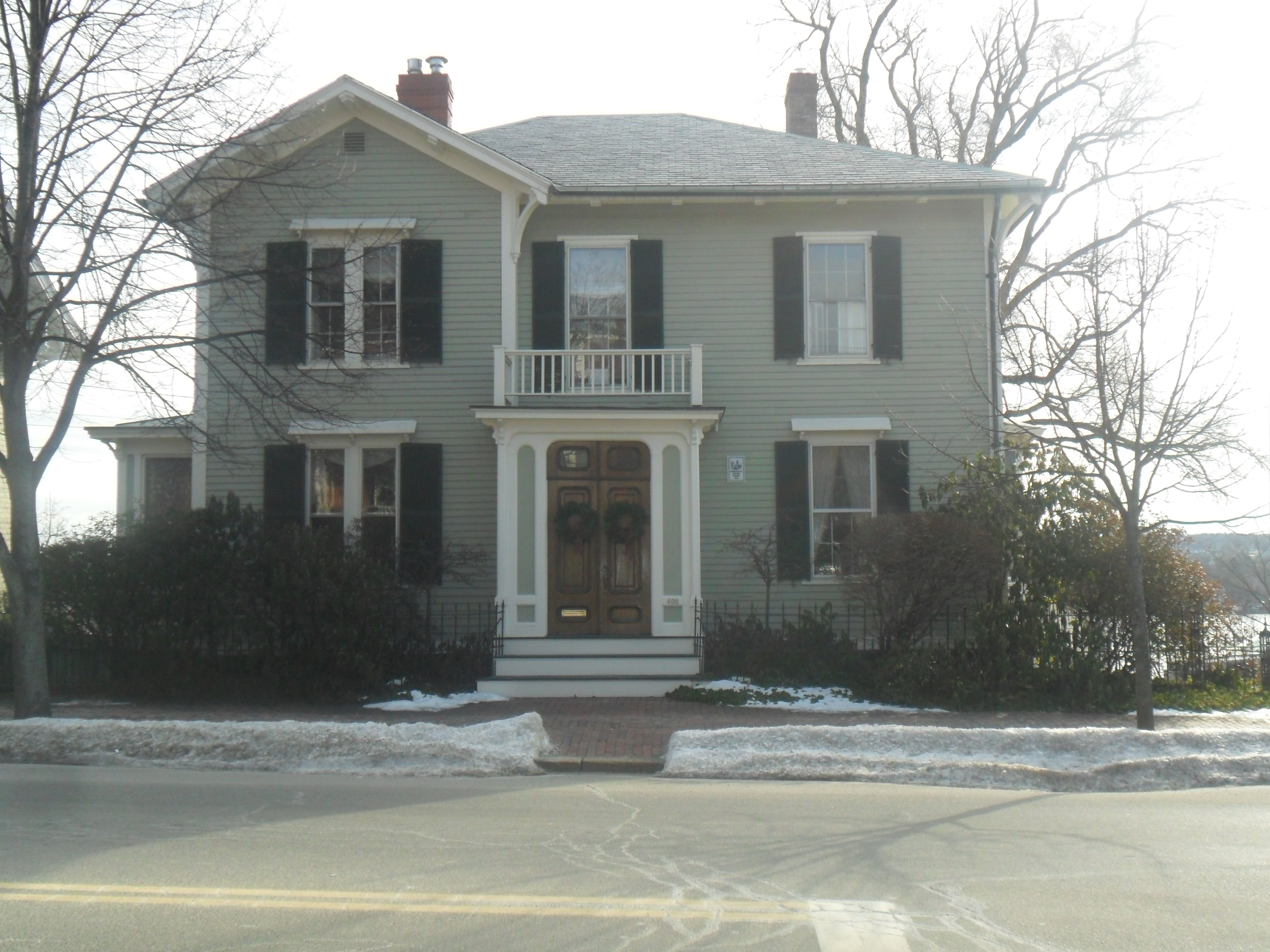
The Harrison Bird Brown House as of January 2011.

Harrison Bird Brown (1831–1915) was an American painter. He was born in Portland, Maine, and died in London, England. He was known primarily for his painting of marine life and White Mountain landscapes. Assistance from art critic and patron John Neal made Brown Portland's most successful artist of the nineteenth century. Brown helped establish the Portland Society of Art and served as one of its first presidents.

His work was exhibited at the National Academy of Design from 1858 to 1875. More recently his work has been exhibited at the Portland Museum of Art, Colby College Museum of Art and Bowdoin College Museum of Art. He was particularly well known for two paintings of Crawford Notch in the White Mountains which were produced in 1890.

In 1892, he moved to London to live with his only surviving child, a daughter. He died there in 1915.

== Harrison Bird Brown House ==
His home, the Harrison B. Brown House, was built overlooking the Fore River in Portland's West End in 1861 and was often the location in which he painted. It was added to the National Register of Historic Places in 1980.

== Published Sources ==
- Routhier, Jessica Skwire, and Earle G. Shettleworth Jr. Vividly True to Nature: Harrison Bird Brown, 1831–1915 (Portland, ME: Portland Museum of Art, 2007)
- Shettleworth, Earle G. A Painter's Progress: The Life, Work, and Travels of Harrison B. Brown of Portland Maine, 2 vols. (Portland, ME: Phoenix Press, 2005–6)
