= West Richwoods, Arkansas =

- Unincorporated community
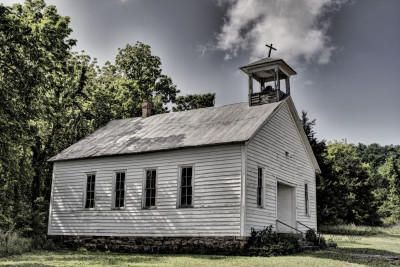
- Historic Schoolhouse and Former Church in West Richwoods

- Location within Arkansas Location within the United States
- Coordinates: 35°49′35″N 92°10′19″W
- Country: United States
- State: Arkansas
- County: Stone
- Elevation: 1,030 ft (310 m)
- Time zone: UTC-6 (Central (CST))
  - Summer (DST): UTC-5 (CDT)
- Area code: 870
- GNIS feature ID: 78728

West Richwoods is an unincorporated community in Stone County, Arkansas, United States. West Richwoods is located on Arkansas Highway 9, 4.2 miles (6.8 km) southwest of Mountain View. The Samuel Brown House and the West Richwoods Church & School, which are both listed on the National Register of Historic Places, are located in West Richwoods.

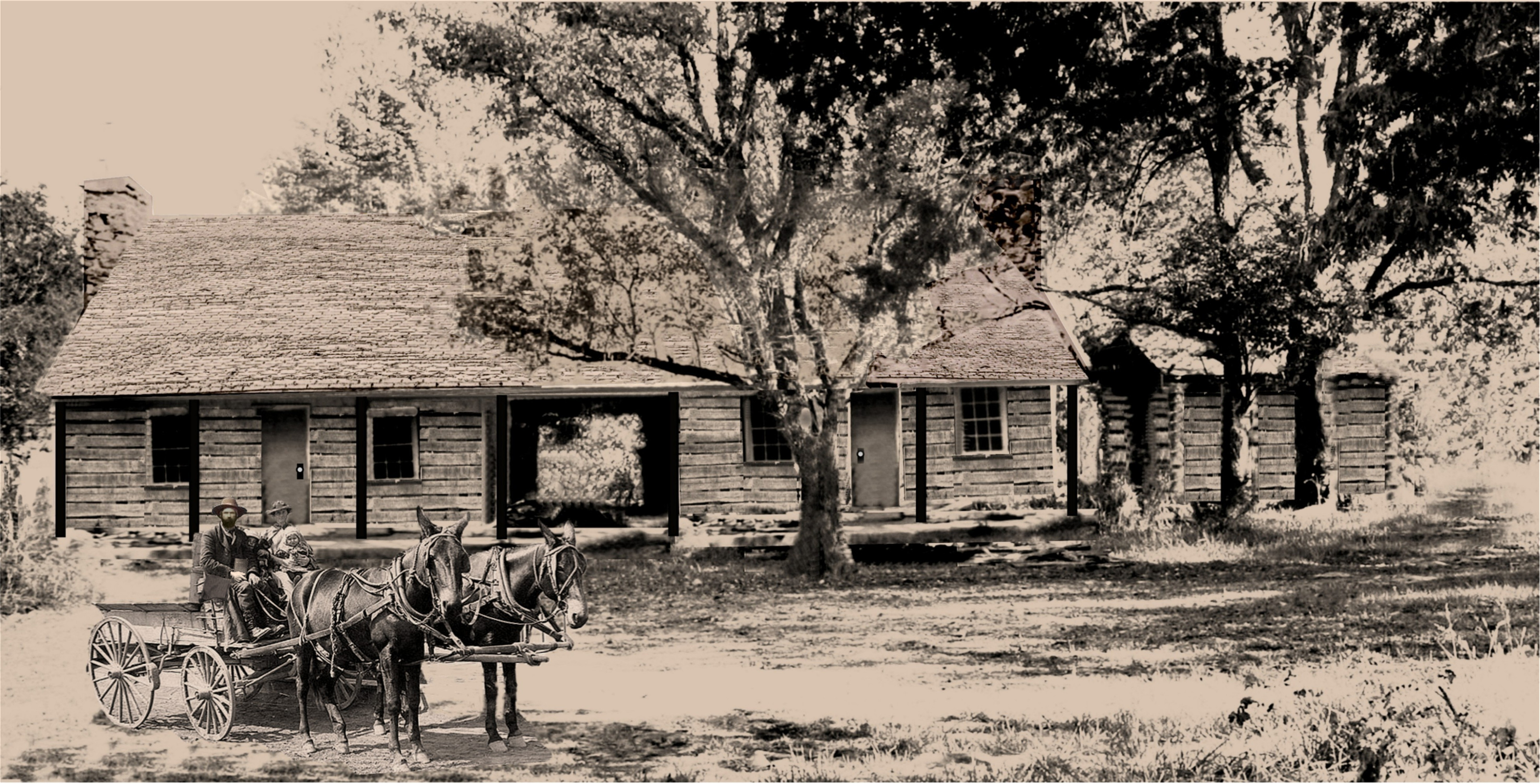
Original Samuel Brown House in 1845
