= O.L. Dunaway House =

Historic house in Arkansas, United States

- O. L. Dunaway House
- U.S. National Register of Historic Places
- U.S. Historic district – Contributing property
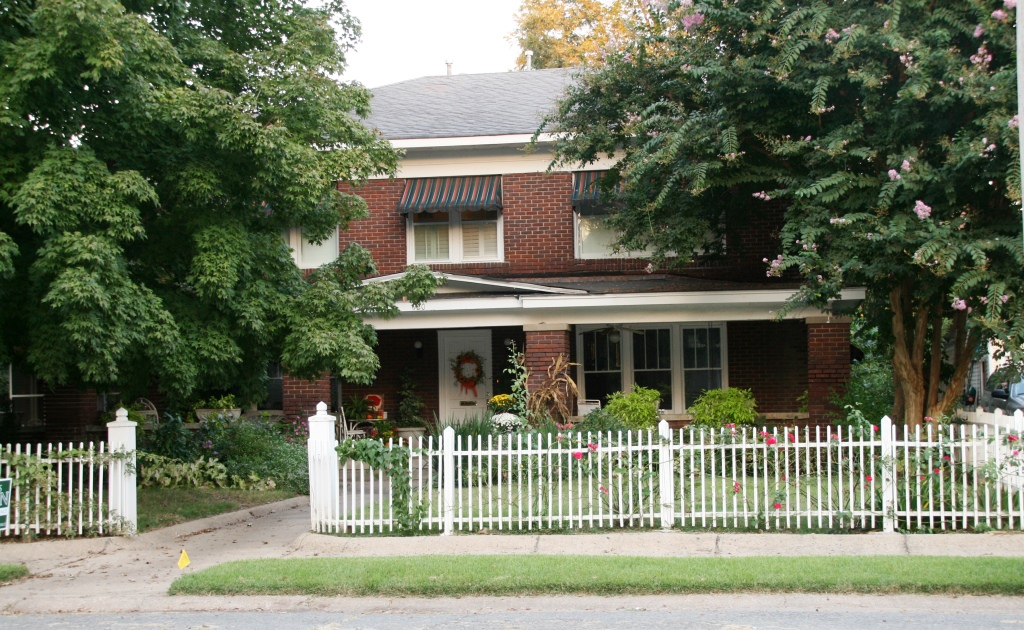

- Location within Arkansas Location within the United States
- Location: 920 Center St., Conway, Arkansas
- Coordinates: 35°5′26″N 92°26′42″W
- Area: less than one acre
- Built: 1923
- Architectural style: American foursqare
- Part of: Robinson Historic District (ID00001645)
- NRHP reference No.: 96000797

Significant dates
- Added to NRHP: July 19, 1996
- Designated CP: January 29, 2001

The O.L. Dunaway House is a historic house at 920 Center Street in Conway, Arkansas. It is a two-story brick American Foursquare, with a hip roof and brick foundation. A single-story porch extends across the front and around the side, supported by brick columns. It is relatively broad for the style, its shape influenced by the Prairie School of design. It was built in 1923 for Oscar Lee Dunaway, a Christadelphian Bible school teacher.

The house was listed on the National Register of Historic Places in 1996.

== See also ==
- National Register of Historic Places listings in Faulkner County, Arkansas
