= Brown-Daly-Horne House =

Historic house in Tennessee, United States

- U.S. National Register of Historic Places
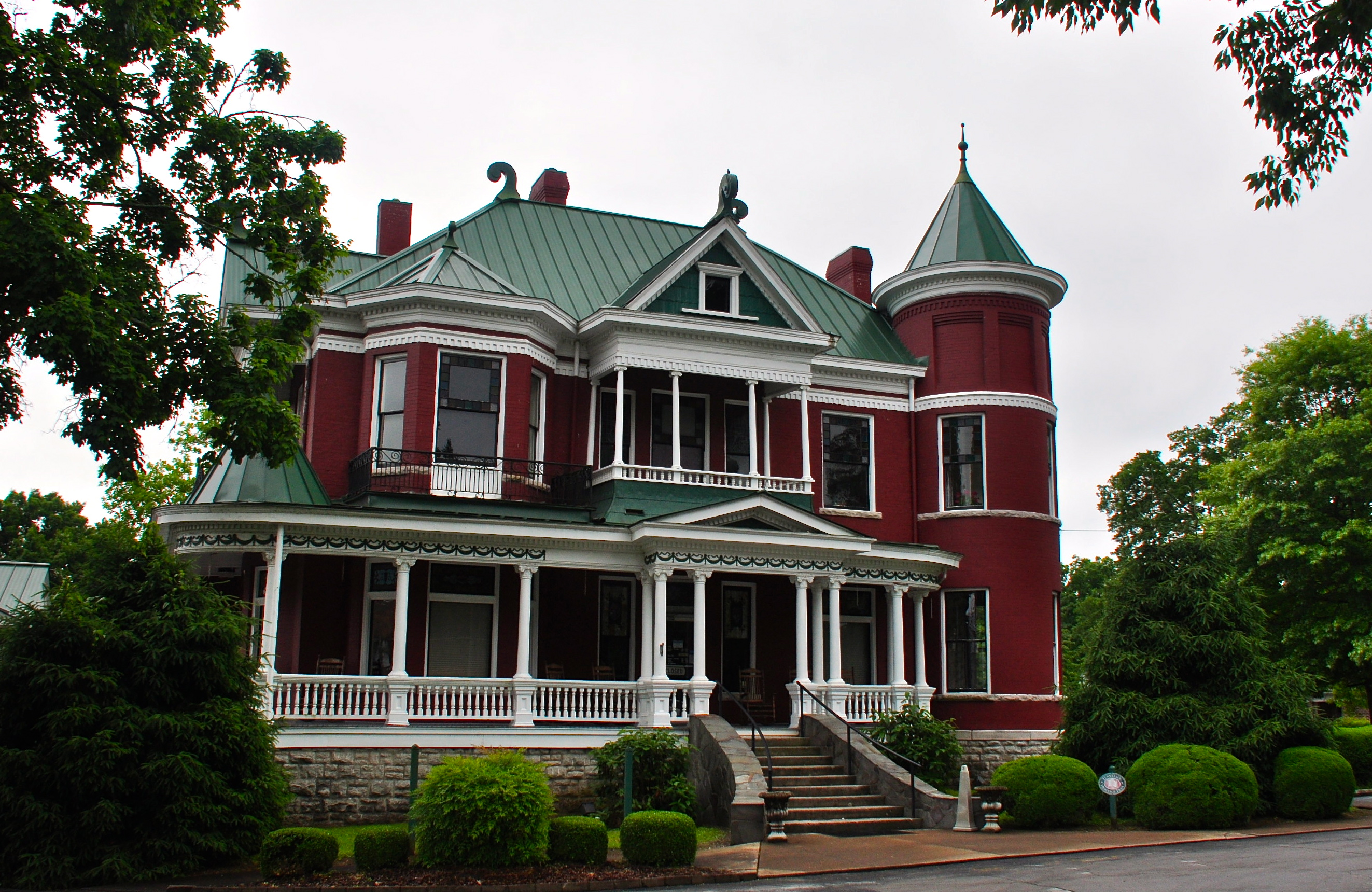
- The house in 2014

- Location within Tennessee Location within the United States
- Interactive map showing the location of Brown-Daly-Horne House
- Location: 307 W. Madison St., Pulaski, Tennessee
- Coordinates: 35°11′58″N 87°2′1″W
- Area: 0.6 acres (0.24 ha)
- Built: 1855
- Architectural style: Queen Anne
- NRHP reference No.: 79002431
- Added to NRHP: December 6, 1979

The Brown-Daly-Horne House is a historic house in Pulaski, Tennessee, United States.

== History ==
The house was built in 1855 for Sarah Jane Roberts. It was purchased by John C. Brown in 1869, and it caught fire in 1871. Two years later, in 1873, it was purchased by Carson T. Mason. It was subsequently purchased by T. E. Daly.

The house has been listed on the National Register of Historic Places since December 6, 1979. It currently serves as an event venue with its upstairs rooms offered as a short-term rental.
