= Alfrey-Brown House =

Historic house in Arkansas, United States

- U.S. National Register of Historic Places
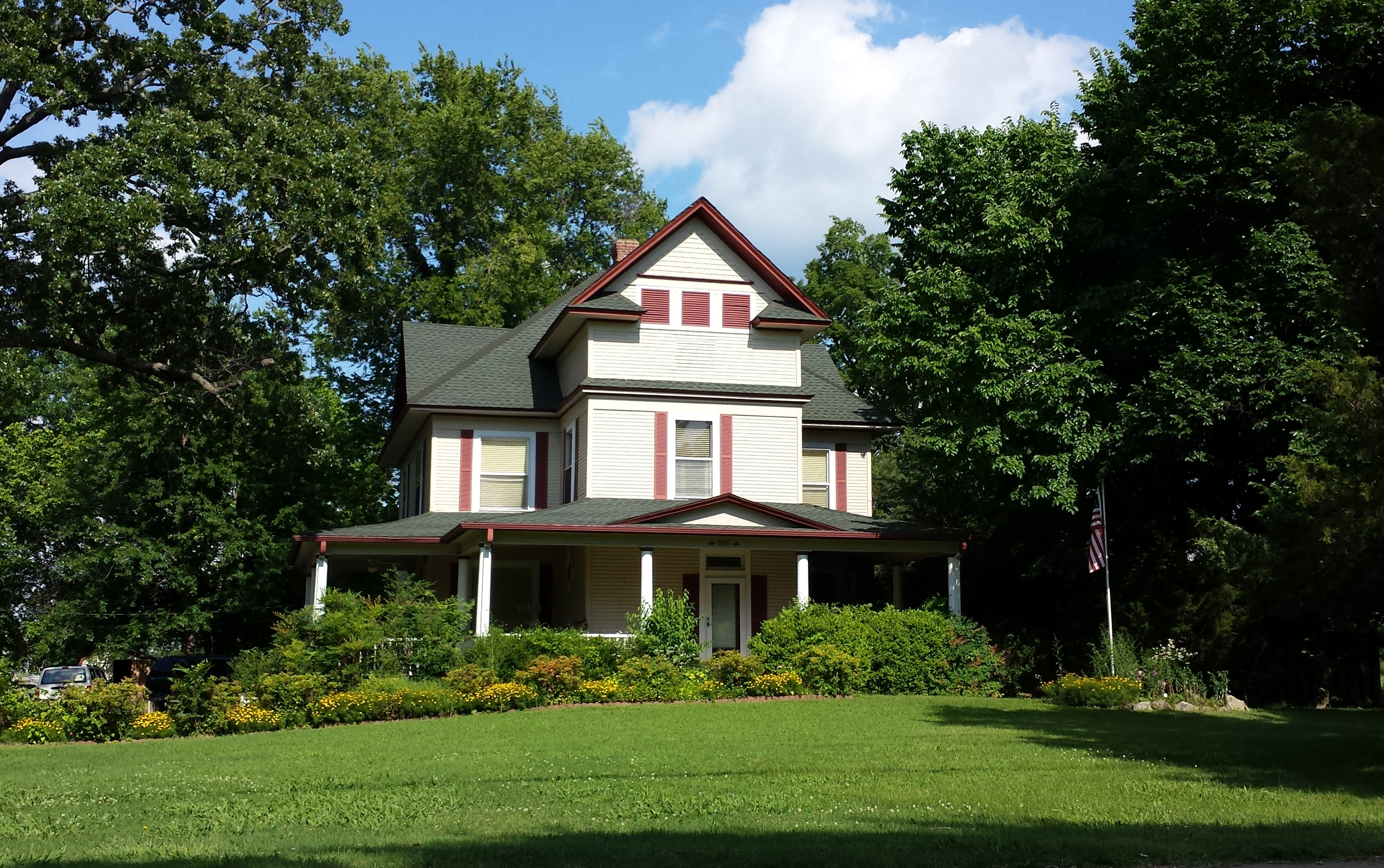

- Location within Arkansas Location within the United States
- Location: 1001 S. Washington St., Siloam Springs, Arkansas
- Coordinates: 36°10′25″N 94°32′11″W
- Area: 1 acre (0.40 ha)
- Built: 1905
- Architect: Alfrey, R.J.
- Architectural style: Colonial Revival
- NRHP reference No.: 84000003
- Added to NRHP: October 4, 1984

The Alfrey-Brown House is a historic house located at 1001 South Washington Street in Siloam Springs, Arkansas, United States.

== History ==
Robert Joseph Alfrey built this home in 1905. At that time, Alfrey was President of the newly founded Siloam Springs Telephone Company, Vice President of the Siloam Springs Cold Storage & Ice Co., and a founding incorporator of the new Siloam Springs Railroad, Light & Power Co., as well as holding other similar positions in other companies.

Soon after, John E. Brown returned to Siloam Springs and bought the home. In 1919, when Brown was establishing what is now John Brown University, he deeded this home, his farm, and other property and possessions to the school to help fund its building.

In 1946, the home was sold to a private family for residence.

== Features ==
This home has a Colonial Revival architecture, and is an example of a prow house: the front projects from the facade in a way that resembles the prow of a ship. Most prow houses, including this one, have a one-story porch on the remaining three sides.

The interior has Queen Anne detailing.

It was listed on the National Register of Historic Places on October 4, 1984.

== See also ==
- National Register of Historic Places listings in Benton County, Arkansas
