= Brown-Sewell House =

Historic house in Wisconsin, United States

- U.S. National Register of Historic Places
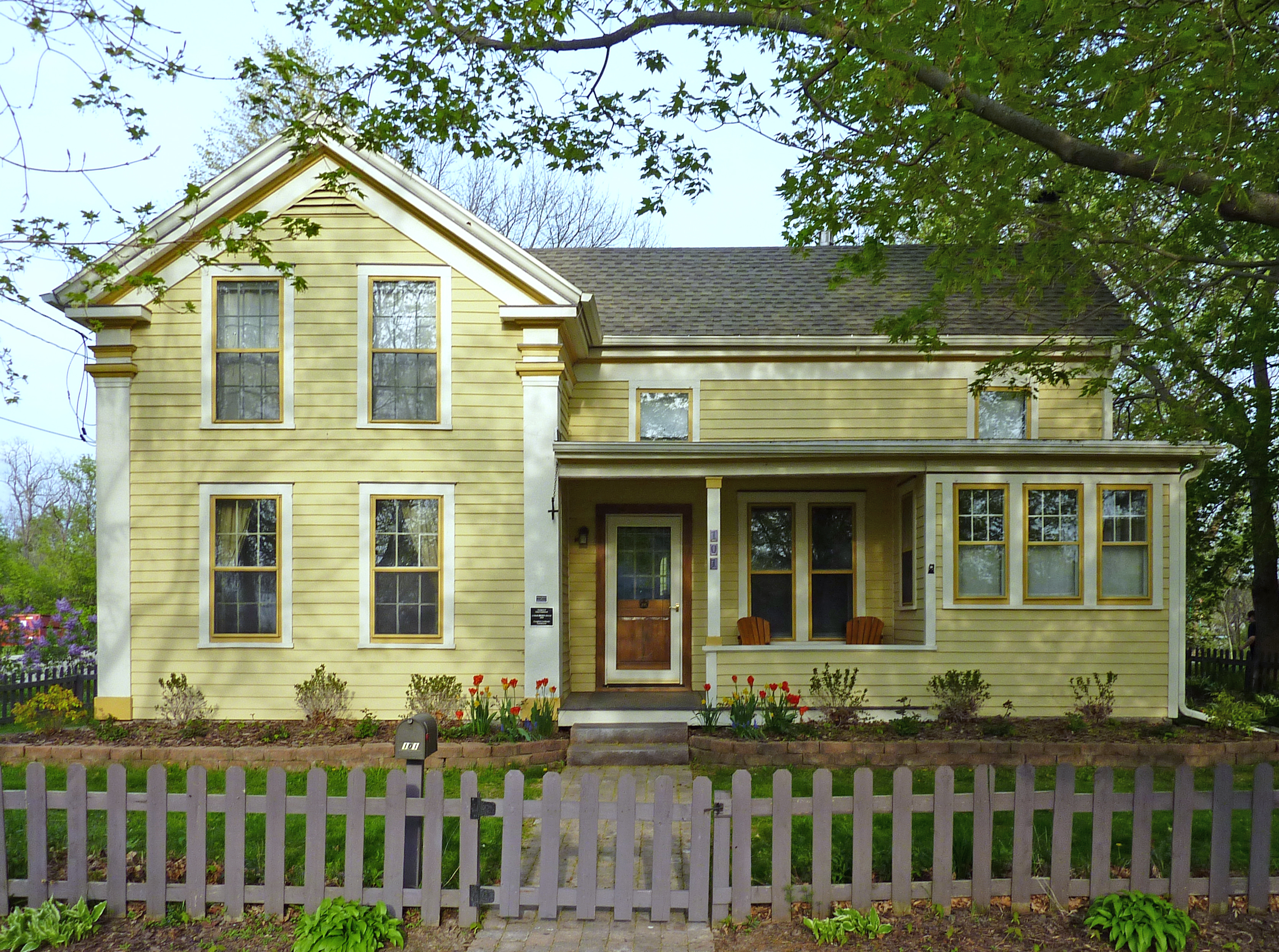
- Brown-Sewell House
- Location: 101 S. Fifth St., Stoughton, Wisconsin
- Coordinates: 42°55′05″N 89°12′59″W
- Area: less than one acre
- Built: 1859
- Architectural style: Greek Revival
- NRHP reference No.: 03000307
- Added to NRHP: April 22, 2003

The Brown-Sewell House is a Greek Revival-styled house built in 1859 in Stoughton, Wisconsin. It was added to the State and the National Register of Historic Places in 2003.

The house was built for Lyman Brown, and possibly by him, in 1859. Hallmarks of the Greek Revival style are the moderately pitched roof, the corner pilasters, the raking cornice, and the entablature. The one-story porch is a replacement, perhaps similar to an original porch in the same location.

Though the house was built for Brown, it was only five years before he sold it to the Reverend Robert Sewell and his wife Elizabeth, in 1864. Rev. Sewell was the minister of the First Congregational Church in Stoughton. He had immigrated from Halstead, England to Canada, then New Jersey, then Wisconsin. He died in 1874 and Elizabeth in 1888, but their two daughters remained in the house into the 1920s.
