= Dr. Flavius Brown House =

Historic house in West Virginia, United States

- U.S. National Register of Historic Places
- Location within West Virginia Location within the United States
- Location: Old Wilderness Rd., Summersville, West Virginia
- Coordinates: 38°16′37″N 80°51′0″W
- Area: 5.9 acres (2.4 ha)
- Built: 1925
- Architectural style: Classical Revival
- NRHP reference No.: 02001053
- Added to NRHP: January 7, 2003

Dr. Flavius Brown House is a historic home located at Summersville, Nicholas County, West Virginia. It was built in 1925, and is a two-story Classical Revival style frame dwelling with a hipped roof. It features a two-story, gabled portico with slender, two-story Doric order columns.

It was listed on the National Register of Historic Places in 2003.
