= James Brown House (Riverdale, Iowa) =

Historic house in Iowa, United States

- U.S. National Register of Historic Places
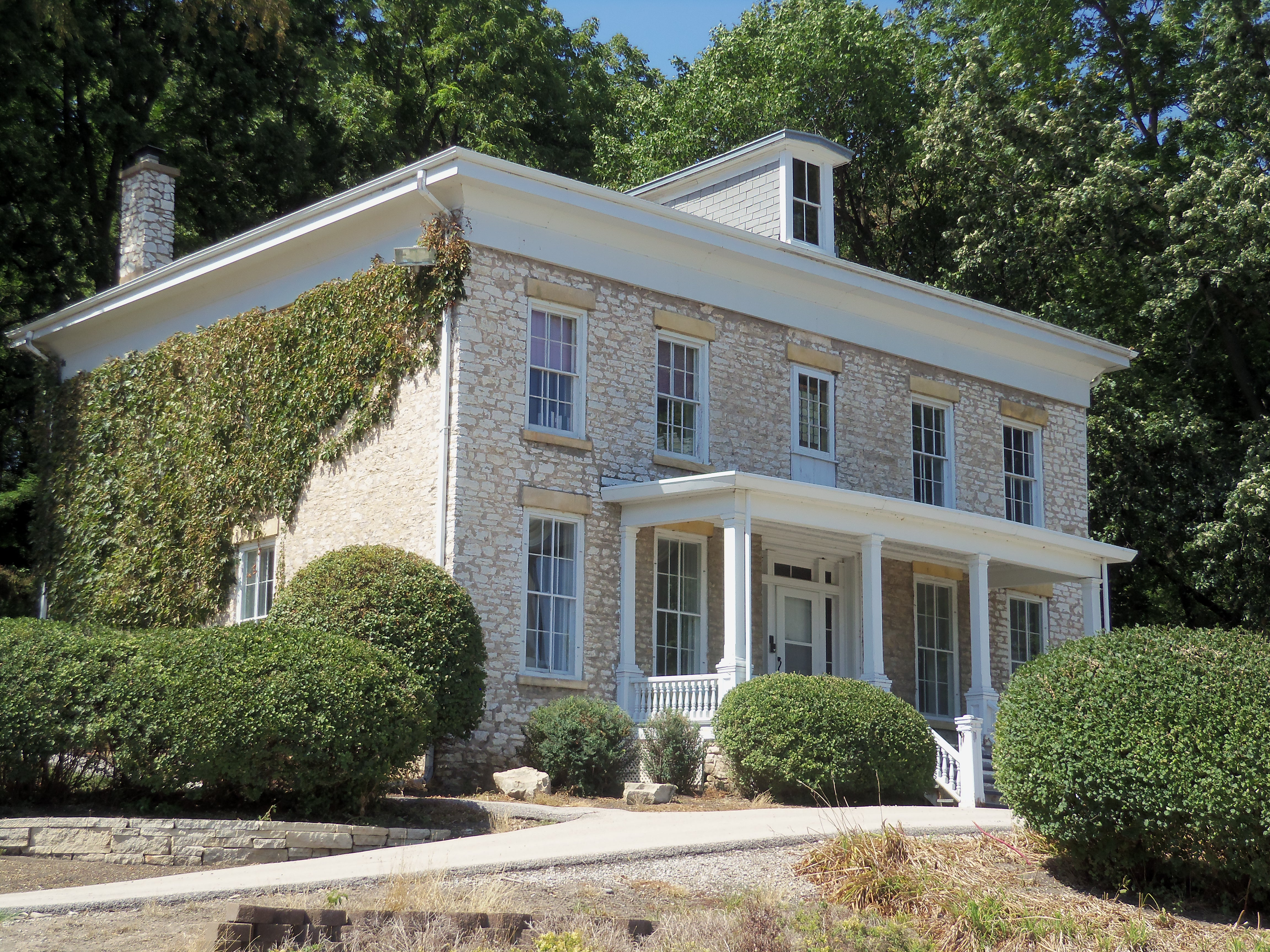

- Location within Iowa Location within the United States
- Location: 4624 State St. Riverdale, Iowa
- Coordinates: 41°32′11.52″N 90°28′12.49″W
- Area: 5.8 acres (2.3 ha)
- Built: 1842
- Architectural style: Vernacular Greek Revival
- NRHP reference No.: 82002643
- Added to NRHP: March 5, 1982

The James Brown House is a historic building located in Riverdale, Iowa, United States. It has been listed on the National Register of Historic Places since 1982.

== History ==
James Brown and his family are the first residents known to have lived in this house. He wrote to his wife from Davenport in 1844 that he had leased the house. He bought the property in 1854. The previous joint owners of the property were Horace Bradley, Lucius Moss, Aaron Moss and Amasa Doolittle, and one of them probably built the structure. The Brown family continued to live in the house until around 1865. It became known as Riverview Farm and for thirty-five years it had a succession of owners. Davenport businessman James R. Nutting bought the property in 1900 and it remained in his family until 1920. Universal Atlas Portland Cement Company bought it from the Nuttings in the 1920s and then sold it to John Crissey in 1937. He restored and maintained the property for 30 years. Alcoa, which operates a plant across the highway, bought the house and grounds in 1967.

== Architecture ==
The stone house is situated on 5.8 acres (2.3 ha) at the base of a bluff overlooking the Mississippi River. The two-story structure is a vernacular interpretation of the Greek Revival style. At the same time, it reflects Roman or Jeffersonian Classicism found in the four-columned front porch and carved balustrades, the raised basement, and tall chimney stacks. The exterior walls and foundation are composed of coursed rubble stone that was quarried locally. For the most part, the windows are the six-over-six variety with wood sashes set in rectangular surrounds. They also feature stone lintels and lug sills. The main entrance is topped with a rectangular transom that is broken by two engaged piers and flanked by sidelights. The house is capped with a hipped roof that is sheathed in seamed tin. There are single gabled dormers on the north and south sides of the roof. At the roofline is a plain frieze and overhanging boxed cornice. Sometime before the turn of the 20th century a 1½-story clapboard addition was built onto the rear of the house. It was used as a blacksmith shop and as a summer kitchen.
