= Mercer Brown House =

Historic house in Maryland, United States

- U.S. National Register of Historic Places
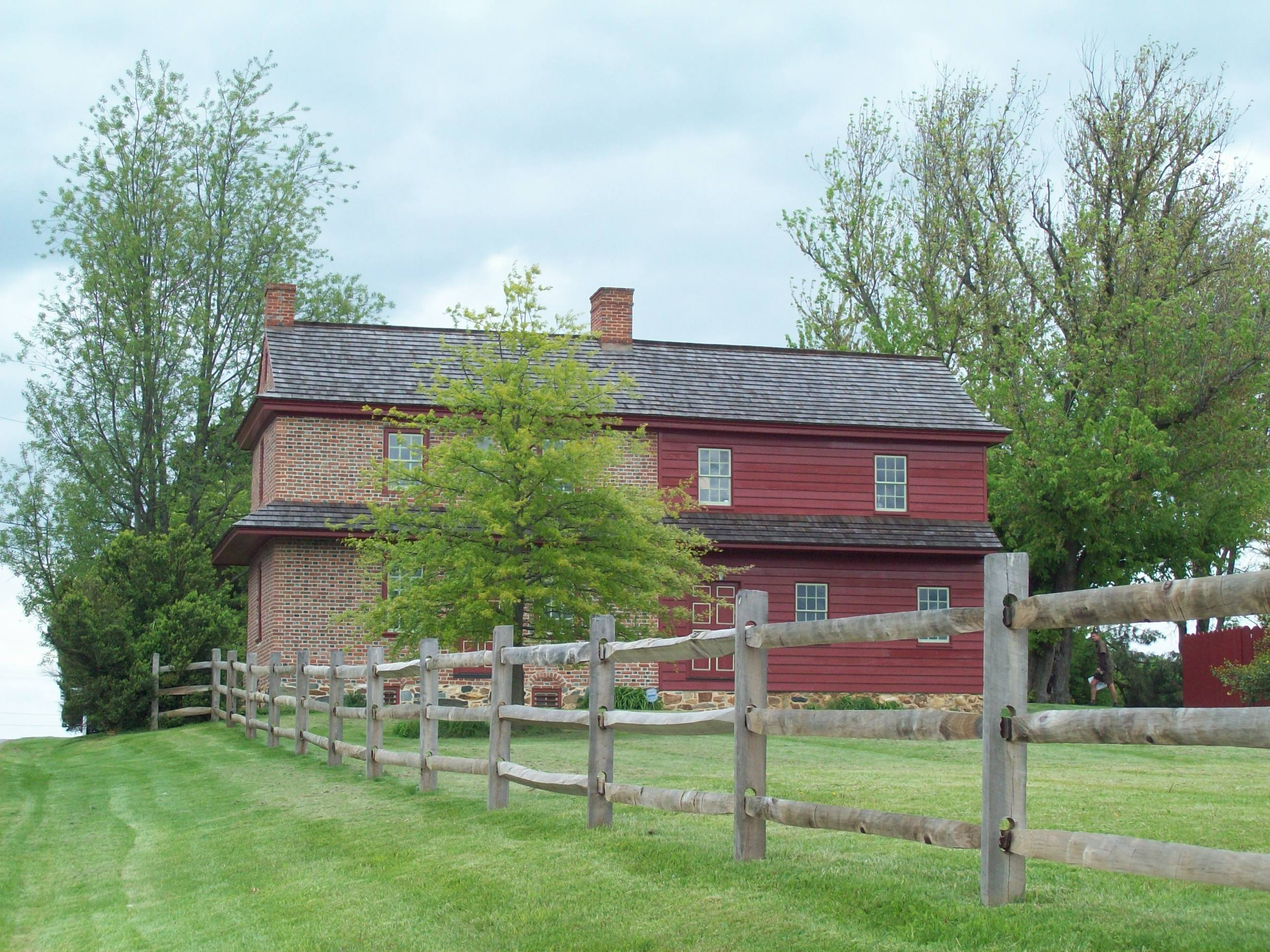
- Mercer Brown House, April 2010

- Location within Maryland Location within the United States
- Location: 1270 England Creamery Rd., Rising Sun, Maryland
- Coordinates: 39°41′28″N 75°59′52″W
- Area: 5 acres (2.0 ha)
- Built: 1746
- Built by: Brown, Mercer (Messer); Et al.
- NRHP reference No.: 87000815
- Added to NRHP: May 29, 1987

The Mercer Brown House is a historic house located at Rising Sun, Cecil County, Maryland, United States. It consists of three distinct portions: a two-story, three-bay, gable-roofed Flemish bond brick part dating to 1746; a three bay wide frame portion of the house dating to the early and late 19th century; and a log pen addition. The house is an example of the Pennsylvania Quaker building tradition in Maryland. The property also has an early-20th century bank barn.

The Mercer Brown House was listed on the National Register of Historic Places on May 29, 1987.
