= Brown–Graves House and Brown's Store =

Historic buildings in North Carolina, United States

- U.S. National Register of Historic Places
- Location within North Carolina Location within the United States
- Location: SW of Yanceyville on NC 150, near Locust Hill, North Carolina
- Coordinates: 36°21′36″N 79°27′04″W
- Area: 9.5 acres (3.8 ha)
- Built: c. 1800
- Architectural style: Georgian, Late Georgian
- NRHP reference No.: 74001334
- Added to NRHP: July 15, 1974

Brown–Graves House and Brown's Store is a historic plantation complex located near Locust Hill, Caswell County, North Carolina. The plantation house was built about 1800, and is a two-story, five-bay, Late Georgian style frame dwelling. It is set on a stone basement and has a low hipped roof. The front facade features a one-story pedimented porch with Corinthian order columns. Brown's Store is located across from the house and is a one-story, gabled frame building with a single shouldered stone and brick chimney. Also on the property are the contributing two slave quarters, a smoke house, and a Greek Revival period law office.

It was added to the National Register of Historic Places in 1974.
