= Samuel Brown House (West Richwoods, Arkansas) =

Historic house in Arkansas, United States

- U.S. National Register of Historic Places
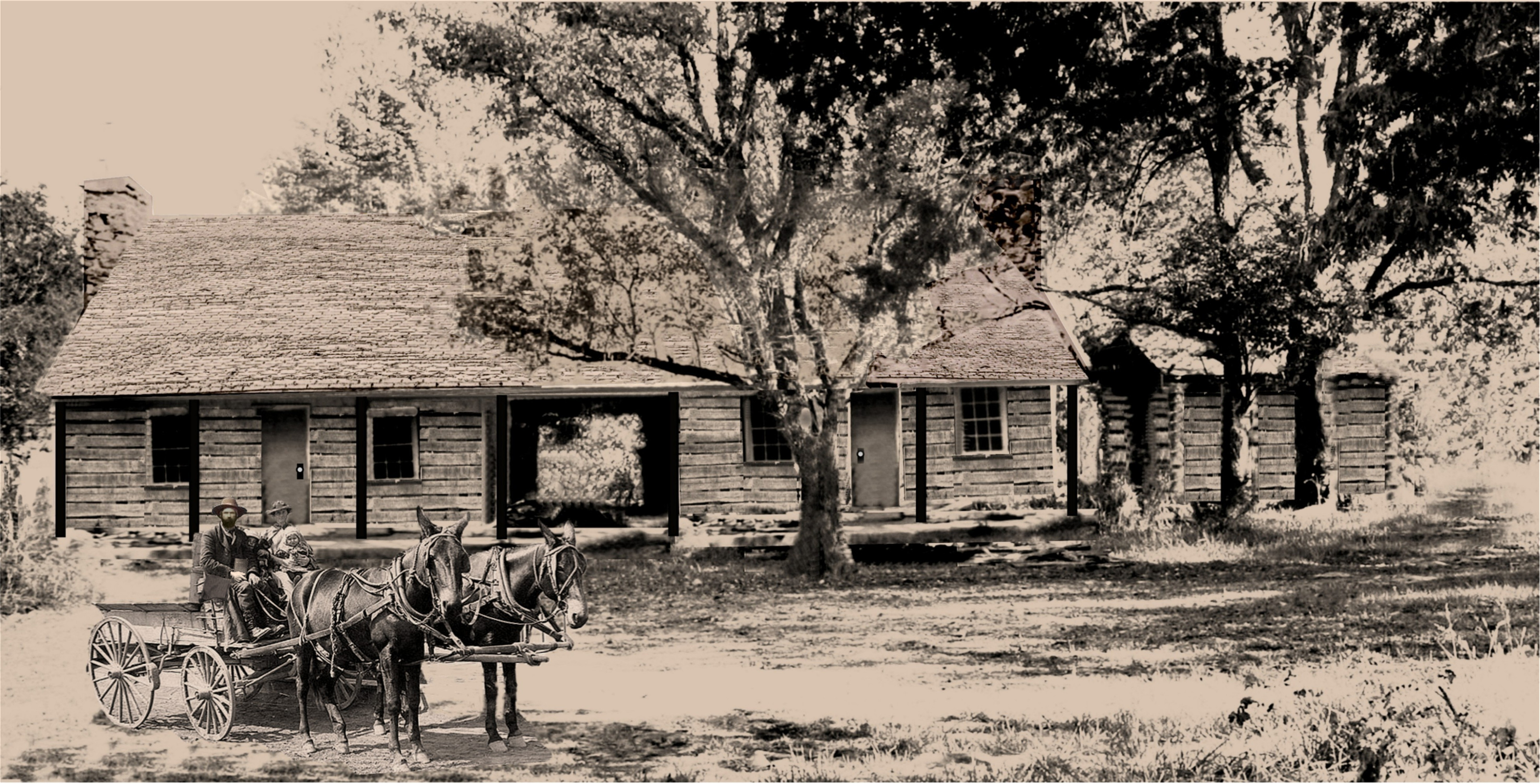
- c. 1840s depiction of the house

- Location within Arkansas Location within the United States
- Location: Off AR 9, West Richwoods, Arkansas
- Coordinates: 35°49′49″N 92°8′39″W
- Area: less than one acre
- Built: 1848
- Architect: Samuel Brown
- Architectural style: Dogtrot
- MPS: Stone County MRA
- NRHP reference No.: 85002204
- Added to NRHP: September 17, 1985

The Samuel Brown House is a historic house in West Richwoods, Arkansas. Located down a long lane south of Arkansas Highway 9, it is a single-story log dogtrot house, with its two pens separated by an open breezeway. Its gable roof extends over the front (western) facade to create a porch, supported by chamfered wooden posts. The house is believed to retain its original weatherboard siding. A period smokehouse stands just south of the main house. The house was built in 1848 by Samuel Brown, who moved to Arkansas from North Carolina in 1840, and was progressively refined by him over the following decades as his financial condition improved.

The house was listed on the National Register of Historic Places in 1985.

== See also ==
- National Register of Historic Places listings in Stone County, Arkansas
