= Brown–Hodgkinson House =

Historic house in Massachusetts, United States

- Brown–Hogkinson House
- U.S. National Register of Historic Places
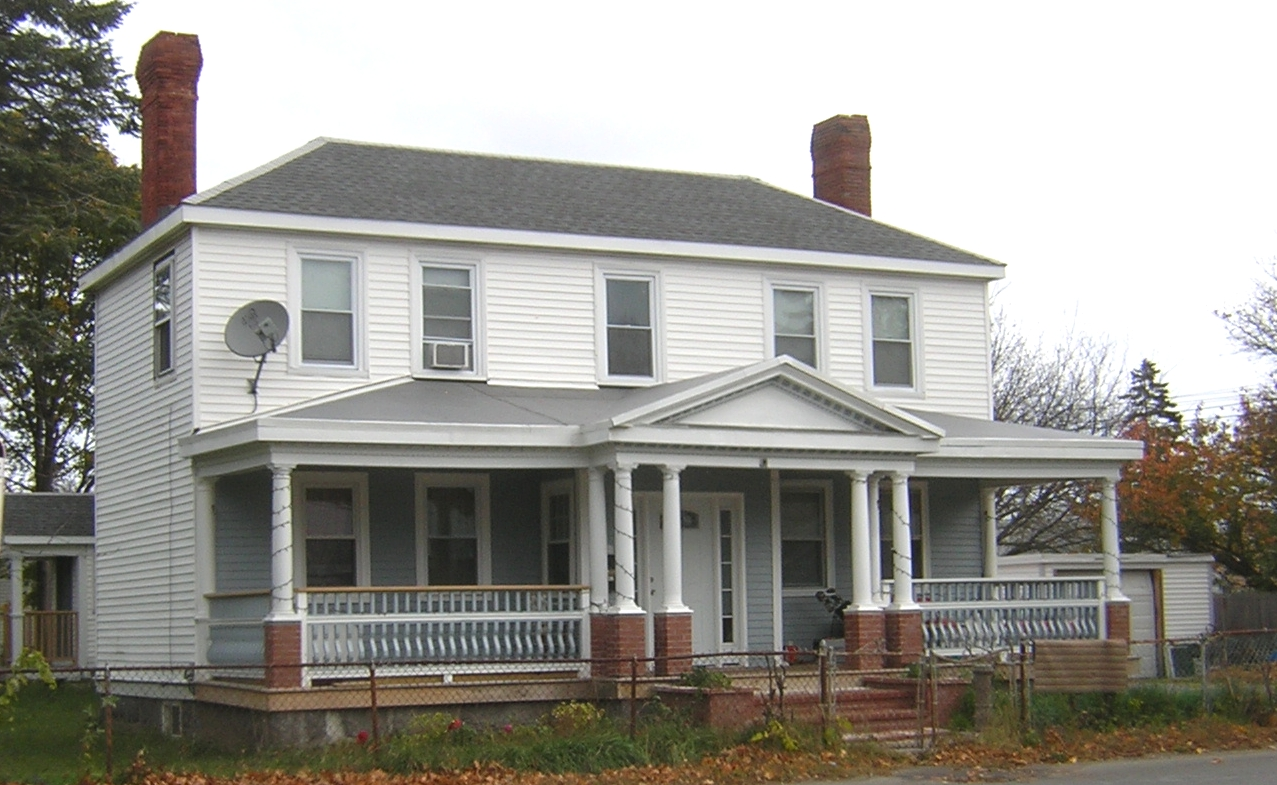

- Location within Massachusetts Location within the United States
- Location: 42 Bicknell St., Quincy, Massachusetts
- Coordinates: 42°15′6.5″N 70°57′50.4″W
- Area: 0.4 acres (0.16 ha)
- Built: 1832
- Architectural style: Colonial Revival, Queen Anne, Federal
- MPS: Quincy MRA
- NRHP reference No.: 89001319
- Added to NRHP: September 20, 1989

The Brown–Hodgkinson House is a historic house at 42 Bicknell Street in Quincy, Massachusetts. This two story wood-frame house, built in 1832, was one of the first in what is known as the Germantown neighborhood. It was built by Captain Charles Brown, who moved here from Provincetown, seeing the beginning of growth of a fishing community. The house is predominantly Federal in character (despite a construction date that is late for that style), and received Queen Anne detailing in the 1880s.

The house was listed on the National Register of Historic Places in 1989.

== See also ==
- National Register of Historic Places listings in Quincy, Massachusetts
