= Roger Brown Home and Studio =

Historic house in Illinois, United States

- U.S. National Register of Historic Places
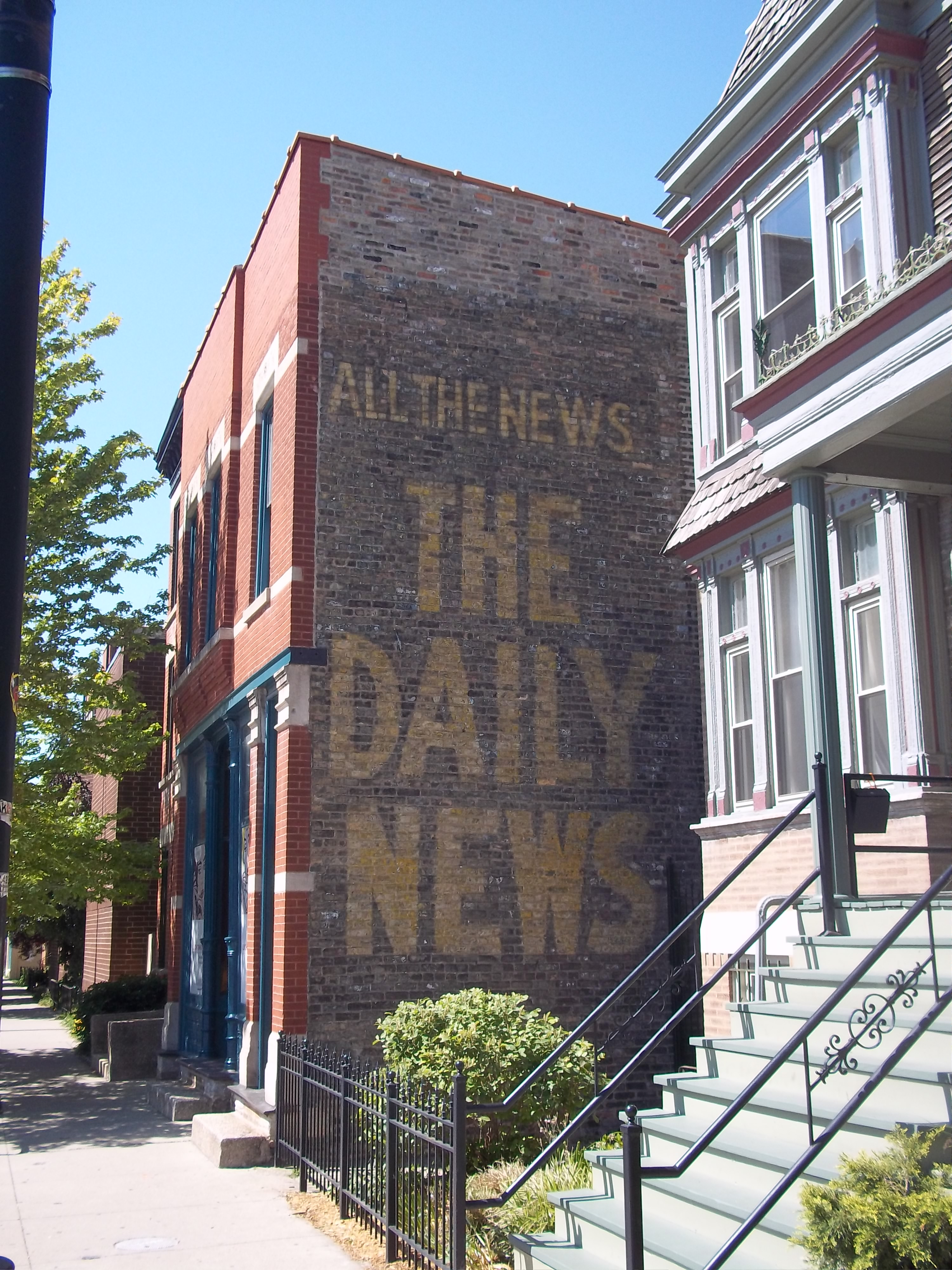

- Location within Chicago metropolitan area Location within Illinois Location within the United States
- Location: 1926 N. Halsted St., Chicago, Illinois
- Coordinates: 41°55′01″N 87°38′56″W
- Area: less than one acre
- Built: 1888
- Architectural style: Italianate
- NRHP reference No.: 11000029
- Added to NRHP: February 22, 2011

The Roger Brown Home and Studio is a historic building at 1926 N. Halsted Street in the Lincoln Park neighborhood of Chicago, Illinois. The building was the home of artist Roger Brown, an influential figure in the Chicago Imagists movement of the mid-twentieth century. Locally, Brown's art has been featured in the Art Institute of Chicago and on the front of 120 North LaSalle; on a national level, his works graced the cover of two issues of Time and have appeared in the New York Times and several major American art museums. Though it was constructed as a store in 1888, Brown and his partner George Veronda purchased the building in 1974 and converted it to a studio and living space. Brown's artistic style inspired his redesign of the home and its back garden; in turn, the home inspired many similar buildings in his artwork. Brown lived and worked in the home until his death in 1997.

The building was added to the National Register of Historic Places on February 22, 2011.
