= A.R. Brown House =

- U.S. National Register of Historic Places
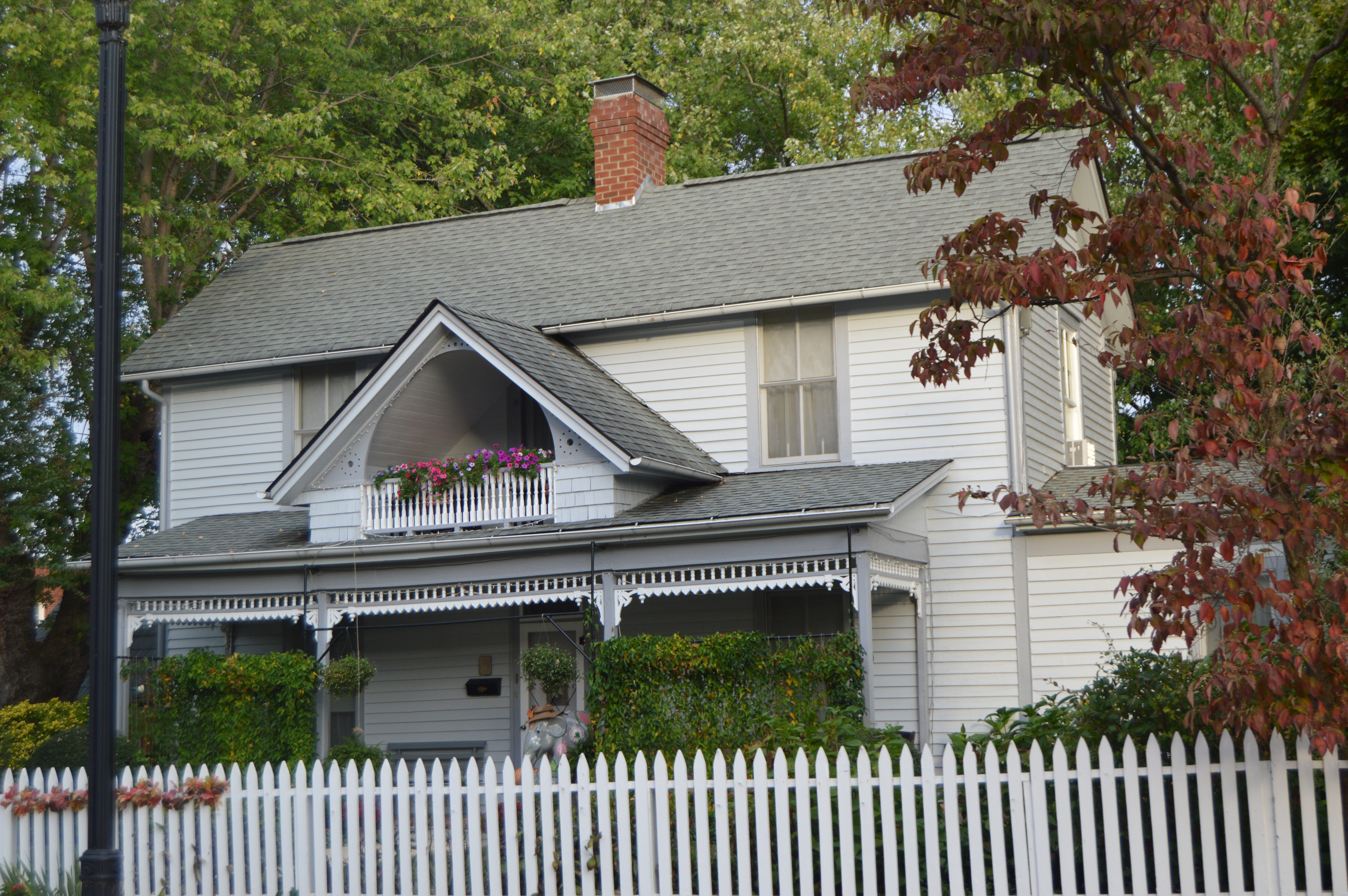
- Front

- Location within Tennessee
- Location: 241 S. Main Ave., Erwin, Tennessee
- Coordinates: 36°8′38″N 82°25′7″W
- Area: 0.5 acres (0.20 ha)
- Architectural style: Folk Victorian
- NRHP reference No.: 07001167
- Added to NRHP: November 8, 2007

The A.R. Brown House, at 241 S. Main Ave. in Erwin, Tennessee, was listed on the National Register of Historic Places in 2007. The listing included three contributing buildings and a contributing site.

It is two-story wood-frame house with some Folk Victorian architectural details, upon a brick foundation. The original house, built c.1894, had just four rooms in one story and was T-shaped in plan. It was expanded in c.1900 and c.1910-16. A c.1916 greenhouse and a pre-1900 shed which was later converted to a garage are also included on the property. The registration stated that the "house retains its architectural integrity, including original doors, windows, and interior woodwork."

It was deemed significant in part for its association with Albert Rosecrans (A.R.) Brown (1863-1937), "one of the driving forces in the development of Erwin" who "was highly involved in the economic, political, social and religious life in Erwin". It was also deemed "a fine representation of a Folk Victorian house in Erwin." It was built by the family of Mrs. Nancy Love around 1894, and was sold to Brown in 1894. Brown added to it during 1899 to 1916, and it has since remained mostly unchanged, including having, in 2007, its original plumbing, heating, and electrical systems. It has the first indoor bathroom in Erwin.

It is at the northeast corner of Depot St. and S. Main Ave. in Erwin.
