= Brown-Evans House =

Historic house in South Dakota, United States

- Brown--Evans House
- U.S. National Register of Historic Places
- Location within South Dakota Location within the United States
- Location: 405 First Ave., W., Mobridge, South Dakota
- Coordinates: 45°32′12″N 100°26′07″W
- Area: less than one acre
- Built: 1916
- Architectural style: Bungalow/craftsman
- NRHP reference No.: 90000960
- Added to NRHP: June 21, 1990

The Brown-Evans House, located at 405 First Ave., W., in Mobridge, South Dakota, was built in 1916. It was listed on the National Register of Historic Places in 1990.

It is a one-story wood frame clapboarded bungalow on a concrete foundation. It was deemed notable "because it is a nearly unaltered local example of vernacular bungalow styling. Built for developer A. H. Brown in 1916 presumably for rental purposes, it is one [of] the few surviving bungaloid dwellings in the community."
