= Brown–Proctor House =

Historic house in Alabama, United States

- U.S. National Register of Historic Places
- Alabama Register of Landmarks and Heritage
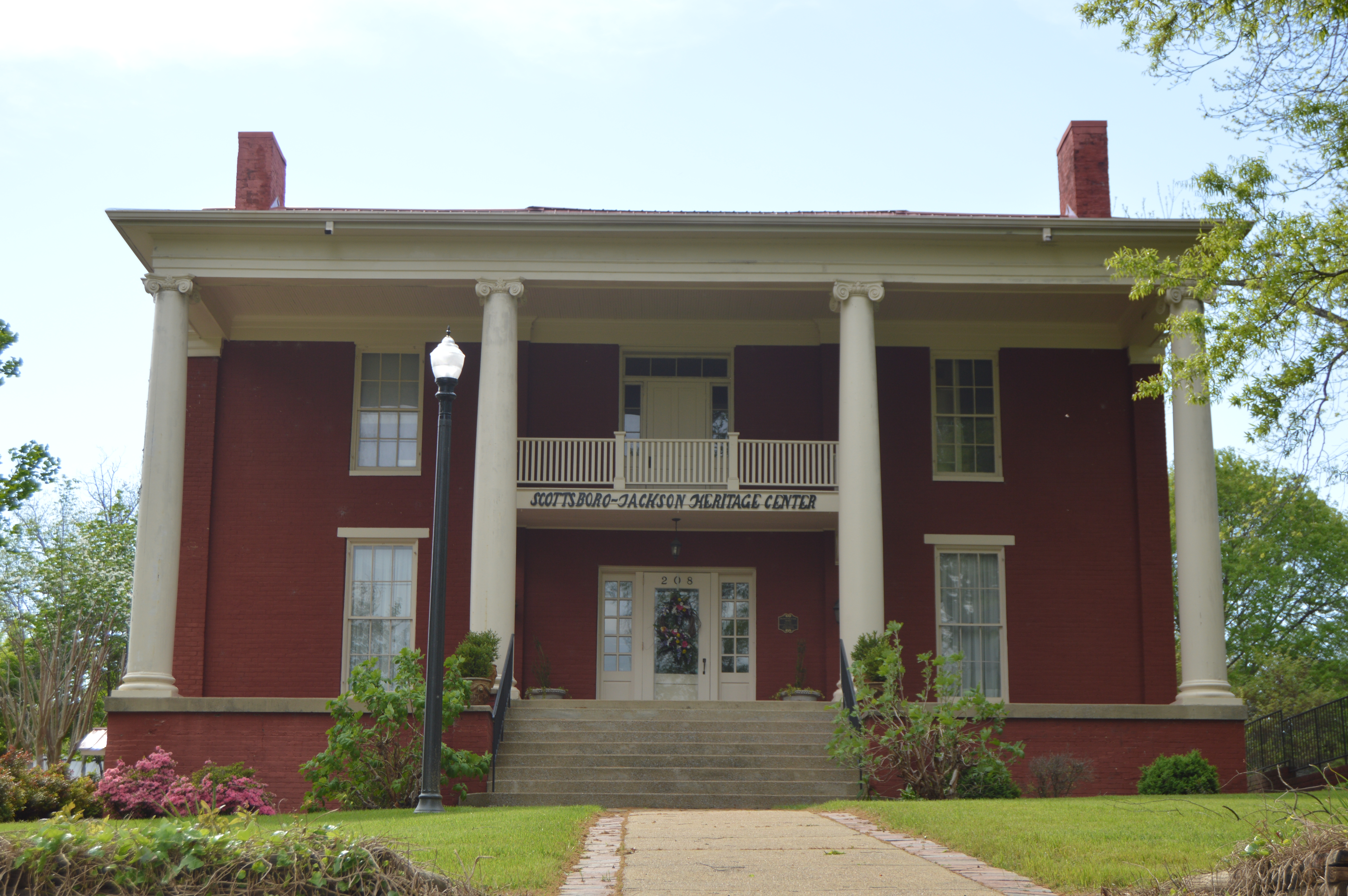
- The house in April 2014

- Location within Alabama Location within the United States
- Location: 208 S. Houston St., Scottsboro, Alabama
- Coordinates: 34°40′19″N 86°2′15″W
- Area: less than one acre
- Built: 1881
- NRHP reference No.: 82002036

Significant dates
- Added to NRHP: September 16, 1982
- Designated ARLH: February 4, 1981

The Brown–Proctor House is a historic residence in Scottsboro, Alabama, United States. The house was built in 1881 by John A. Brown, who sold it just one year later. He sold the house to General Coffey, who bought the house for his daughter Sarah, for 3,200 dollars. John Franklin Proctor, a politician who served in the Alabama Legislature from 1892 through 1899 and was an attorney for the Scottsboro Boys in 1931, purchased the house in 1907. Proctor made numerous renovations to the house, including altering the two-story front portico with Tuscan columns into its current state of a single-level porch supported by Ionic columns with a central second floor balcony. A three-room addition was also built onto the back of the house, adding to the central hall plan of the original house. After his death in 1934, Proctor's family owned the house until 1981.

The house was listed on the Alabama Register of Landmarks and Heritage in 1981 and the National Register of Historic Places in 1982.

== Scottsboro-Jackson Heritage Center ==
The Scottsboro-Jackson Heritage Center opened in the house in 1985. The Center focuses on the history, customs, traditions and art of Jackson County, Alabama. Displays include area Native-American cultures and history, area pioneer settlers, the Civil War and the house itself.
