= Harrison B. Brown House =

Historic house in Maine, United States

- U.S. National Register of Historic Places
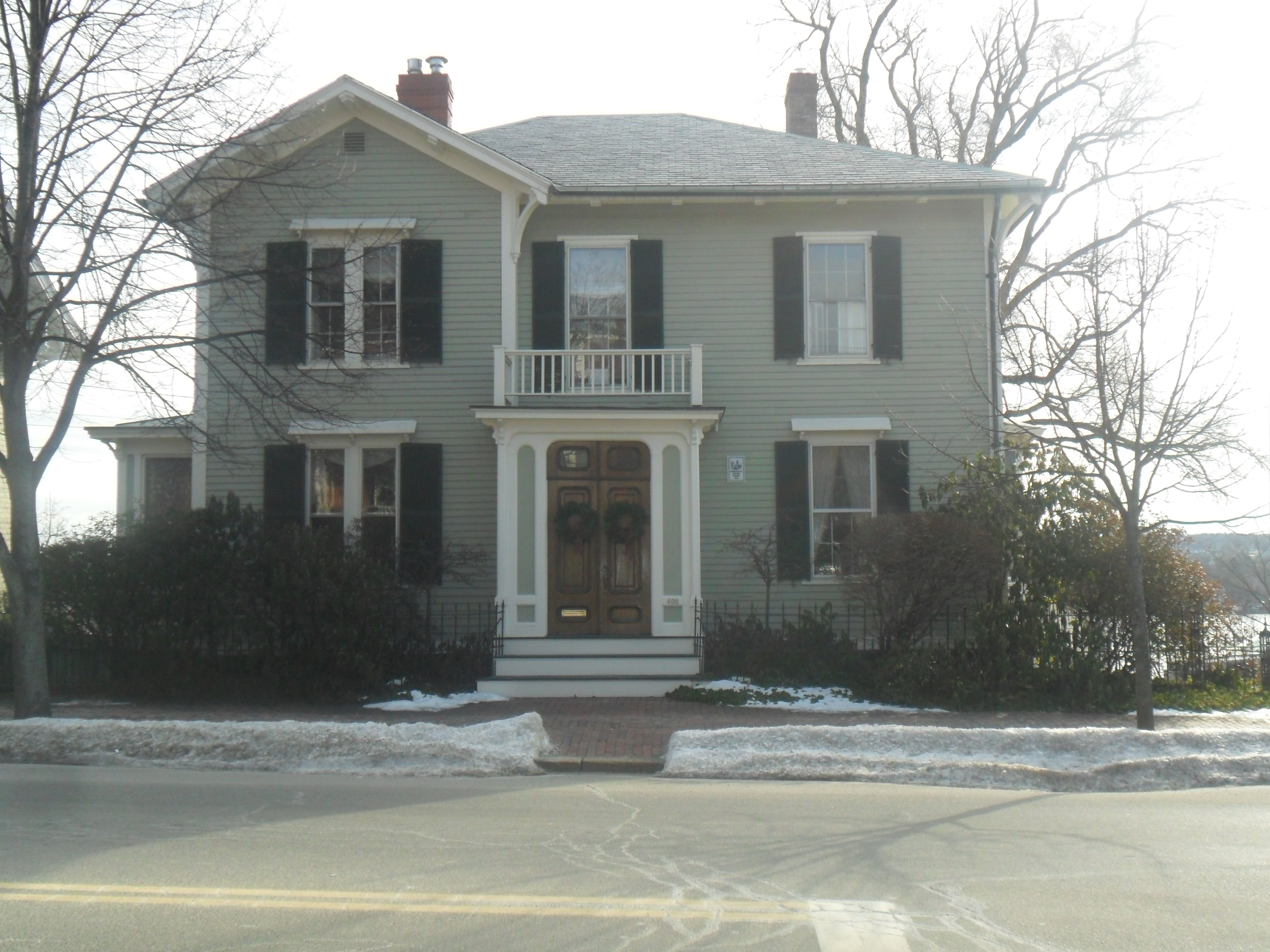
- Harrison B. Brown House in January 2011

- Location within Maine Location within the United States
- Location: 400 Danforth St., Portland, Maine, U.S.
- Coordinates: 43°38′39″N 70°16′19″W
- Area: 0.3 acres (0.12 ha)
- Built: 1861
- Architectural style: Italianate
- NRHP reference No.: 80000227
- Added to NRHP: June 23, 1980

The Harrison Bird Brown House is an historic house at 400 Danforth Street in the West End of Portland, Maine, United States. It was built in 1861 for Harrison Bird Brown (1831–1915), one of Maine's best-known painters of the late 19th century, and was his home and studio until 1892. The house was listed on the National Register of Historic Places in 1980.

== Description and history ==
The Brown House stands on the south side of Danforth Street, near the southernmost tip of Falmouth Neck, the peninsula on which downtown Portland and its harbor facilities are located. It is a two-story wood-frame structure, with a hip roof, bracketed deep cornice, clapboard siding, and a brick foundation. Its main facade faces north, and is three bays wide, with a projecting two-story ell in the left bay, and the entrance at the center bay, set in a projecting enclosed vestibule topped by a simple balustrade. A two-story ell projects to the rear of the house, overlooking the Fore River, which housed Harrison Bird Brown's studio space.

Brown was one of Portland's best known painters during the late nineteenth century. He had this house built in 1861, and lived and worked here until 1892, when he moved to England, where he died. He met with immediate success in the painting of landscapes, and he exhibited at the National Academy of Design in New York City. His painting of White Head on Cushing Island in Casco Bay, where he maintained a studio, was exhibited in the Maine pavilion at the 1893 World's Columbian Exposition in Chicago.

== See also ==
- National Register of Historic Places listings in Portland, Maine
