= John Brown IV House =

Historic house in Massachusetts, United States

- U.S. National Register of Historic Places
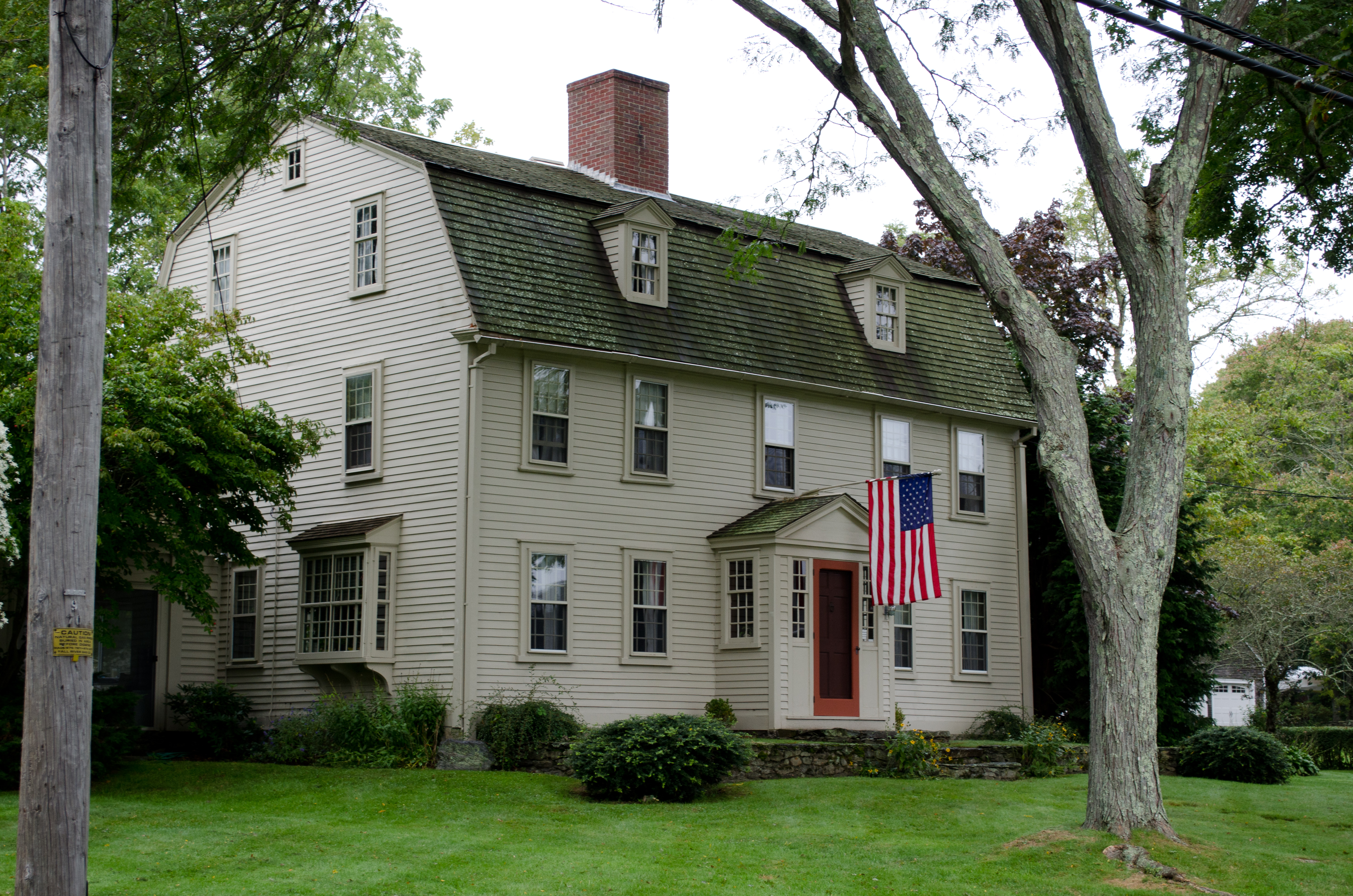

- Location within Massachusetts Location within the United States
- Location: 703 Pearse Road, Swansea, Massachusetts
- Coordinates: 41°43′40″N 71°13′41″W
- Area: 1.84 acres (0.74 ha)
- Built: 1752
- Architectural style: Colonial Revival, Georgian
- MPS: Swansea MRA
- NRHP reference No.: 90000064
- Added to NRHP: February 16, 1990

The John Brown IV House is a historic colonial house in Swansea, Massachusetts. It is a 2 1/2-story wood-frame structure, five bays wide, clapboard siding, and a gambrel roof pierced by two gabled dormers. An enclosed entrance portico projects at the center of the main facade, and ells extend the house to the rear. The house was built c. 1752, and is a well-preserved example of a typical period farmhouse from the period. The entry portico and enlarged window above are Colonial Revival (early 20th century) alterations. The Brown family were locally prominent farmers and landowners.

The house was listed on the National Register of Historic Places in 1990.

== See also ==
- National Register of Historic Places listings in Bristol County, Massachusetts
