= Hamilton-Brown House =

Historic house in Tennessee, United States

- U.S. National Register of Historic Places
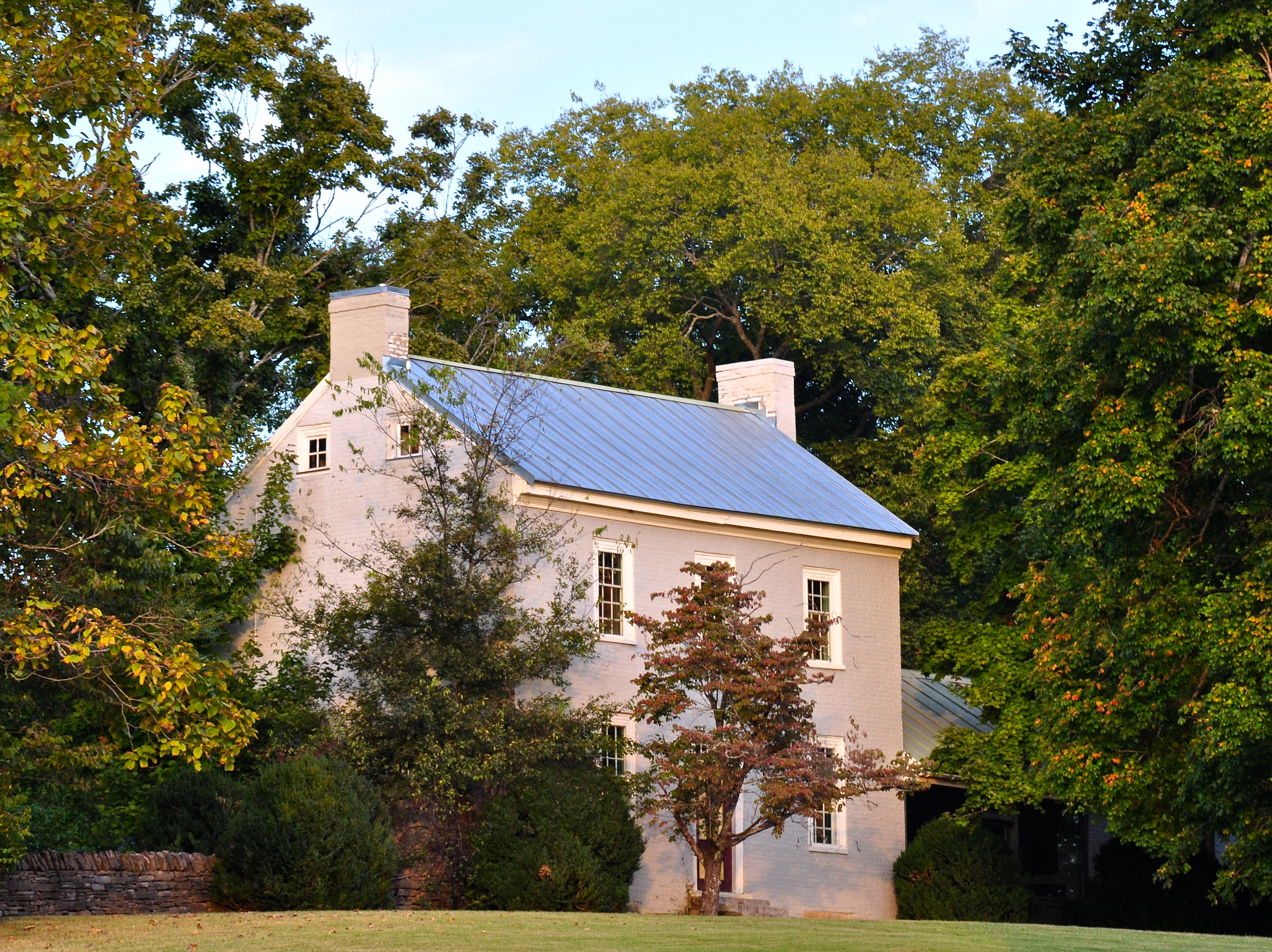
- Hamilton-Brown House, September 2014.

- Location within Tennessee Location within the United States
- Location: 845 Old Charlotte Pike, Franklin, Tennessee
- Coordinates: 35°56′15″N 86°55′7″W
- Area: 5 acres (2.0 ha)
- Built: c. 1800, c. 1850, c. 1940, c.1960 and c.1997
- Architectural style: Federal, Hall-and-parlor
- NRHP reference No.: 06000668
- Added to NRHP: August 2, 2006

The Hamilton-Brown House, in Franklin, Tennessee, also known as the Elijah Hamilton House or as Cottonwood, is a historic two-story brick house that was listed on the National Register of Historic Places in 2006.

It was built between 1792 and c.1800, making it one of the very oldest houses in Williamson County. It originally had a hall-and-parlor plan. A brick one-story east wing was extended in c. 1850 and c. 1940. A one-story brick and log north wing was extended from the east wing in c.1960 and c.1997.

When listed the property included four contributing buildings and two contributing sites on an area of 5 acres (2.0 ha).

The property is denoted as Williamson County historic resource WM-56.
