= Joe Brown House and Farmstead =

Historic house in Arkansas, United States

- U.S. National Register of Historic Places
- Location within Arkansas Location within the United States
- Nearest city: Little Red, Arkansas
- Coordinates: 35°28′34″N 91°43′20″W
- Area: 2 acres (0.81 ha)
- Built by: Joe Brown, Ben Reaper
- Architectural style: Vernacular double-pen
- MPS: White County MPS
- NRHP reference No.: 91001338
- Added to NRHP: September 13, 1991

The Joe Brown House and Farmstead is a historic property in rural White County, Arkansas. It is located about one mile south of the end of County Road 529, and about 2 miles (3.2 km) north of the hamlet of Little Red as the crow flies. It is a single-story dogtrot house, with a corrugated metal roof and board-and-batten siding. The front facade has a shed-roof porch extending across part of the front, sheltering two entrances giving access to the two pens and the breezeway. The property includes a well and the remains of a log smokehouse. The house was built about 1890, and is one of White County's few surviving 19th-century dogtrots.

The property was listed on the National Register of Historic Places in 1991, at which time it was reported to be in deteriorated condition.

== See also ==
- National Register of Historic Places listings in White County, Arkansas
