= William Brown House =

William Brown House may refer to:

- William Brown House (London Town, Maryland)
- William H. Brown House, Allegan, Michigan
- Will Q. Brown House and Wash House, Riddle, Oregon, listed on the National Register of Historic Places (NRHP)

== See also ==
- William Brown Building, Rockford, Illinois, listed on the NRHP in Winnebago County, Illinois
