= Brown-Kercheval House =

Historic house in Indiana, United States

- Formerly listed on the U.S. National Register of Historic Places
- Location: 315 S. 2nd St., Rockport, Indiana
- Area: 1.5 acres (0.61 ha)
- Built: 1853
- Architectural style: Greek Revival, Gothic Cottage
- NRHP reference No.: 73000045

Significant dates
- Added to NRHP: September 20, 1973
- Removed from NRHP: April 2, 1999

Brown-Kercheval House was a historic home located at Rockport, Indiana. The original section was built in 1853–1854, and was a 1 1/2-story, wood-frame Gothic Cottage style dwelling with Greek Revival style design elements. It was originally a six-room house and subsequently expanded in 1880 and 1908 to a 14-room house. A kitchen wing was added in 1954. Also on the property was a contributing brick outbuilding. It was destroyed by fire in April, 1994.

It was listed on the National Register of Historic Places in 1973 and delisted in 1999.
