= Duff T. Brown House =

Historic building in Arizona, US

- U.S. National Register of Historic Places
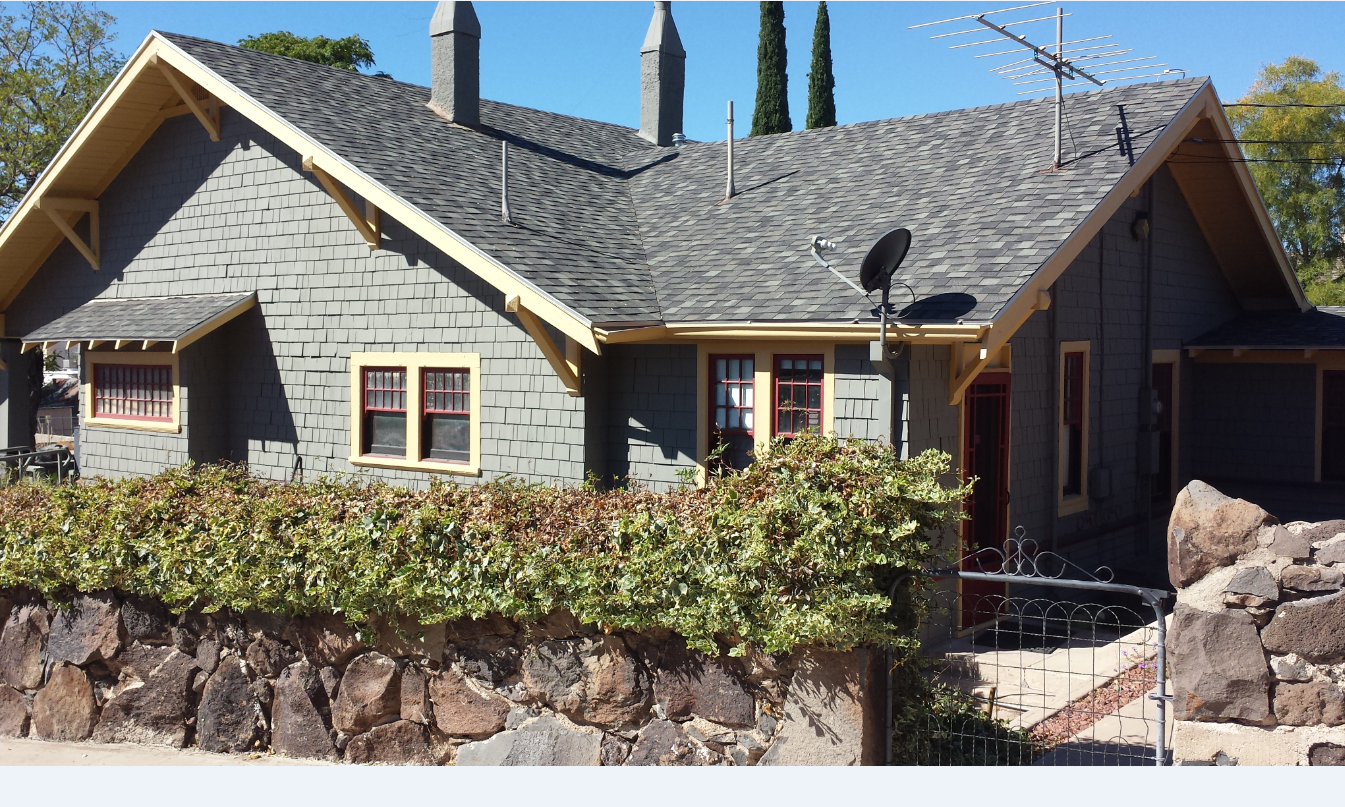

- Location within Arizona Location within the United States
- Location: 541 Oak Street, Kingman, Arizona
- Coordinates: 35°11′26″N 114°02′58″W
- Built: 1911
- Architectural style: Bungalow/Craftsman
- MPS: Kingman MRA
- NRHP reference No.: 86001116
- Added to NRHP: May 14, 1986

The Duff T. Brown House is a Bungalow/Craftsman style house located in Kingman, Arizona. It was listed on the National Register of Historic Places in 1986. It was evaluated for National Register listing as part of a 1985 study of 63 historic resources in Kingman that led to this and many others being listed.

== Description ==
The Duff T. Brown House is located at 541 Oak Street in Kingman, Arizona. The home was built in 1911 in the Bungalow/Craftsman style. This house would be one of the newer houses on Oak Street. Mr. Brown was a Kingman Pioneer from Ontario, Canada. He was quite active in civic organizations. Today, the house is property of Mohave County and is used by the county. The house was added to the National Register of Historic Places in 1986.
