= Stephen William Brown Stone House =

Historic house in North Dakota, United States

- U.S. National Register of Historic Places
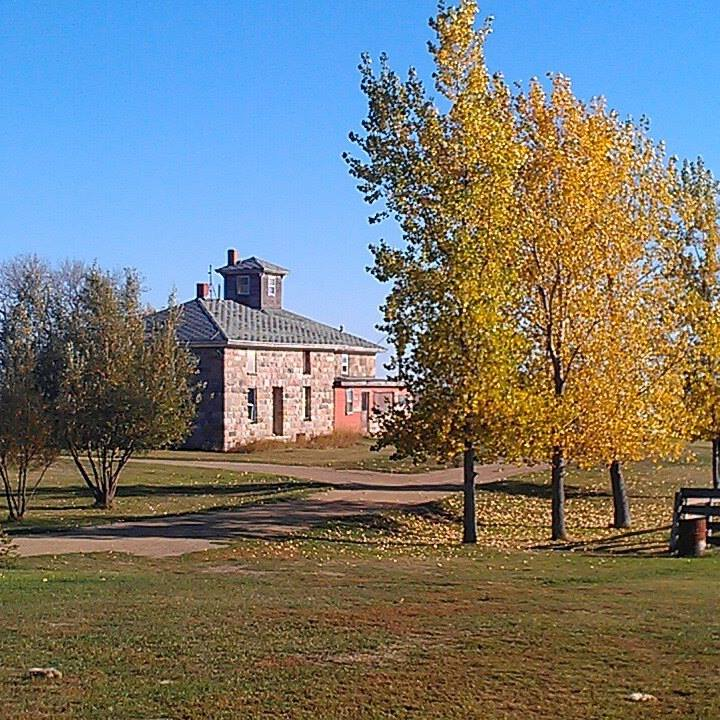

- Location within North Dakota Location within the United States
- Nearest city: Montpelier, North Dakota
- Coordinates: 46°42′58″N 98°52′57″W
- Area: 1 acre (0.40 ha)
- Built: 1889
- Built by: Brown, Stephen William; Jackson, George
- NRHP reference No.: 03001545
- Added to NRHP: February 4, 2004

The Stephen William Brown Stone House near Montpelier, North Dakota, United States, is a stone house built by Stephen William Brown in 1889. It was listed on the National Register of Historic Places in 2004. The house includes a part built in 1889 with a cupola, and a lower addition from the 1980s.
