= Brown House (Bald Knob, Arkansas) =

Historic house in Arkansas, United States

- U.S. National Register of Historic Places
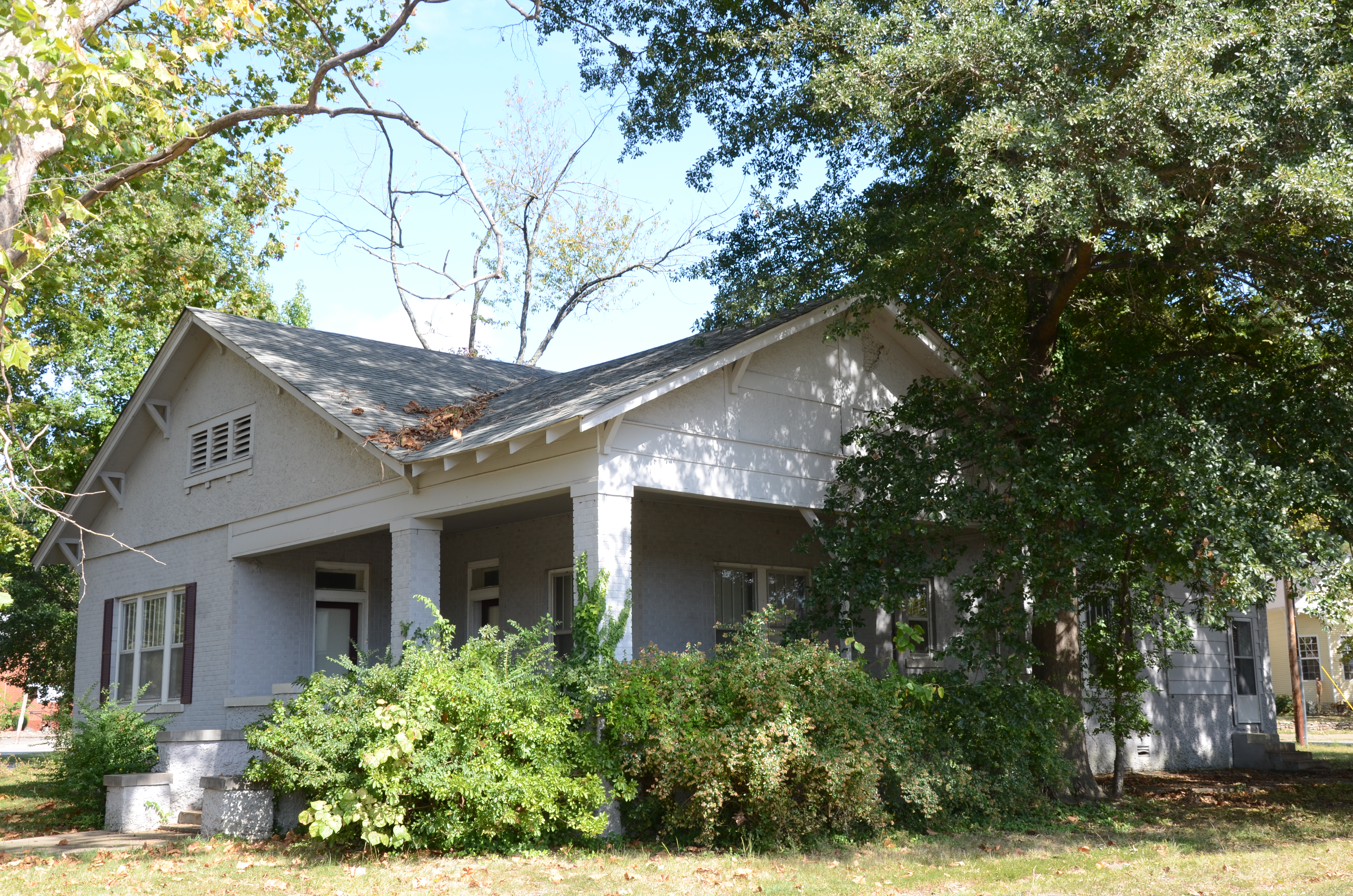

- Location within Arkansas Location within the United States
- Location: Elm St., Bald Knob, Arkansas
- Coordinates: 35°18′39″N 91°34′7″W
- Area: less than one acre
- Built: 1925
- Architectural style: Bungalow/craftsman
- MPS: White County MPS
- NRHP reference No.: 91001268
- Added to NRHP: September 13, 1991

The Brown House is a historic house on Elm Street in Bald Knob, Arkansas. It is a single-story wood-frame structure, finished in brick, with a front-facing gable roof and a gable-roof porch that projects to the side. The porch is supported by brick columns set on a low stuccoed wall. The deep eaves of the roof feature knee brackets and exposed rafter ends. Dating to the mid-1920s, it is a local example of Craftsman architecture.

The house was listed on the National Register of Historic Places in 1991.

== See also ==
- National Register of Historic Places listings in White County, Arkansas
