= Brown House (Conway, Arkansas) =

Historic house in Arkansas, United States

- U.S. National Register of Historic Places
- U.S. Historic district – Contributing property
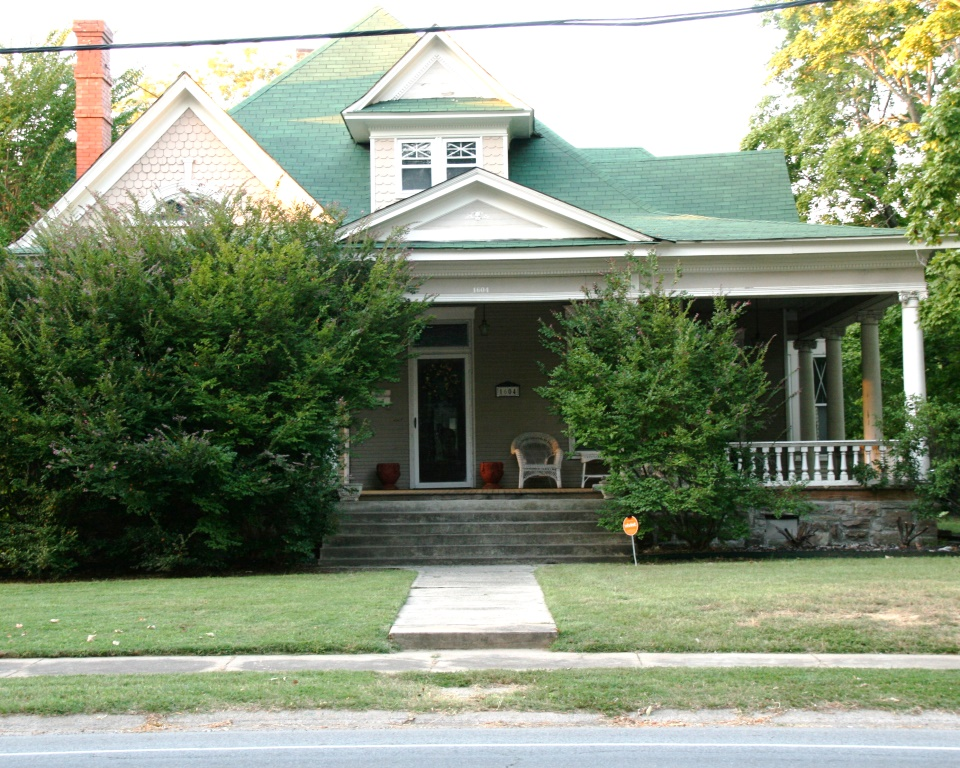

- Location within Arkansas Location within the United States
- Location: 1604 Caldwell St., Conway, Arkansas
- Coordinates: 35°5′24″N 92°26′44″W
- Area: less than one acre
- Built: 1904
- Architect: Charles L. Thompson
- Architectural style: Colonial Revival
- Part of: Robinson Historic District (ID00001645)
- MPS: Thompson, Charles L., Design Collection TR
- NRHP reference No.: 82000811

Significant dates
- Added to NRHP: December 22, 1982
- Designated CP: January 29, 2001

The Brown House is a historic house at 1604 Caldwell Street in Conway, Arkansas. It is a 1 1/2-story wood-frame structure, with Colonial Revival and Queen Anne features. It has a tall hip roof, from with gables project, some finished in decoratively cut shingles. It has a wraparound porch supported by Ionic columns with a balustrade of urn-shaped spindles. It was designed by prolific Arkansas architect Charles L. Thompson and built about 1900.

The house was listed on the National Register of Historic Places in 1982.
