= Jim Brown House =

- U.S. National Register of Historic Places
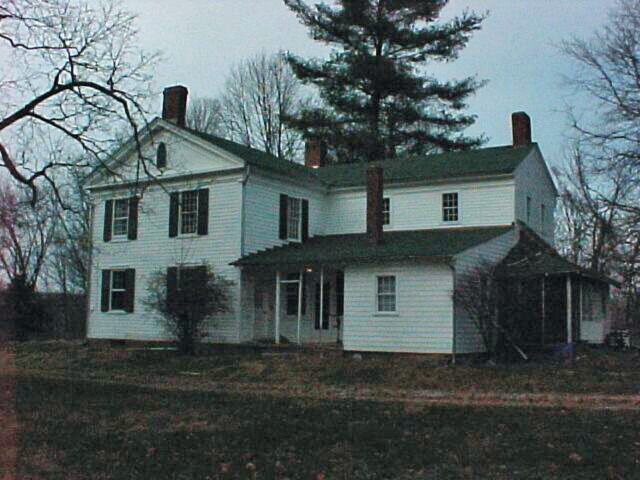

- Location within Ohio Location within the United States
- Nearest city: Peninsula, Ohio
- Coordinates: 41°10′54″N 81°34′42″W
- Area: 3.5 acres (1.4 ha)
- Built: 1845
- Architectural style: Greek Revival
- NRHP reference No.: 79000299
- Added to NRHP: March 2, 1979

The Jim Brown House, also known as the Brown-Bender House, sits east of Ira and Akron-Peninsula Roads in Peninsula, Ohio, United States. Constructed in 1840, it sits back off the road, up a hidden, winding and steep driveway.

== Description ==
The house is a four over four Greek Revival House. This style of house was popular in the 19th century in America as the country greatly identified with Greek philosophy and politics. The house is white, supposedly resembling the great marble architecture of Greece. Also typical of this style, the roof has a lower pitch and the entrance door is framed with wide trim. The two story house has a commanding presence, sitting upon a hill with two chimneys and nine windows with green shudders. The land also includes several over buildings. The big raised bank barn was built in 1886. This barn, the house, and Jim Brown's grave marker have all been listed in the National Register of Historic Places. A greenhouse that was built in 1930 is located approximately one hundred feet south of the house. A small part of the farmstead is the orchard. There are a variety of fruit trees and grapevines in this small area. Thirty-five acres of farmland are also included in the property. Most of this acreage is located west of Akron-Peninsula Road. This land lies in the Cuyahoga flood plain since the river flows through a section of the land. It has been flooded numerous times. The house has not been affected by flooding since it sits a lot higher than the fields.

== Original owner ==
More notable than the actual house is to whom the house belonged. Jim Brown, the owner, was a notorious counterfeiter. This man generally sold five thousand dollars of fake, counterfeit bills for one thousand dollars of legitimate money, taking advantage of the contemporary economy. During the Revolutionary War, the Continental Congress authorized issuing American currency. This was a further step to gaining independence from England, no longer relying on English money. At the time, paper money was produced by banks (approximately sixteen hundred nationwide), regulated by state charters. With seven thousand different types of banknotes, it was extremely difficult for anyone to determine which ones originated from legitimate sources.

Brown needed printing plates and other expensive equipment to start, and Brown was determined to use legitimate money to purchase them. One night, he took five horses from his stables and rode towards Pittsburgh, leaving the horses at thirty-mile intervals. In the afternoon, he walked into a Pittsburgh bank with a fraudulent credentials and certified bank draft; upon receiving his money, he rushed home, changing horses at each interval. Upon returning home, he immediately began splitting wood under his neighbor's window, and when the neighbor's wife came to investigate the noise, he learned from her that the time was 7:30AM. Investigators suspected that Brown had been responsible for defrauding the bank, but when the neighbor's wife testified that he was at home, the investigation was dropped: surely Brown could not have been responsible if he were already at home on the following morning. Brown employed an identical strategy several additional times, defrauding banks as far away as Boston, Massachusetts.

Summit County sheriff Sam A. Lane was determined to get Brown arrested, even though no allegation could be proven. Since Brown would disclose that his money was fraudulent, he couldn't be charged with passing counterfeit currency, as the law prohibited passing bad money as good. Brown himself rarely touched counterfeit money, but he was ultimately caught in the nearby town of Boston after returning from New Orleans with goods for resale. However, the crime was seen as of little significance, as the rareness of money caused local residents to prefer bad money to no money at all. In 1834 he was elected a justice of the peace, and although he continued his scheme, he was twice returned to office.

Brown was repeatedly arrested and tried, including twelve times between 1837 and 1840. Finally, in 1846, he was sentenced to ten years in prison, but his sentence was reduced to just three years for good behavior, as he had nursed numerous patients during a cholera epidemic in the prison. Nevertheless, he spent the following years in and out of prison various counterfeiting charges.

Brown died in December 1865 as a result of a severe fall while walking on a canal boat. A legend exists that Jim had hidden some of his wealth somewhere in the Cuyahoga Valley, and he died before being able to retrieve it.

== Bibliography ==
1. Ellis, William Donohue. The Cuyahoga. New York City: Holt, 1966. Print.
