= George M. Brown House =

Historic house in Utah, United States

- U.S. National Register of Historic Places
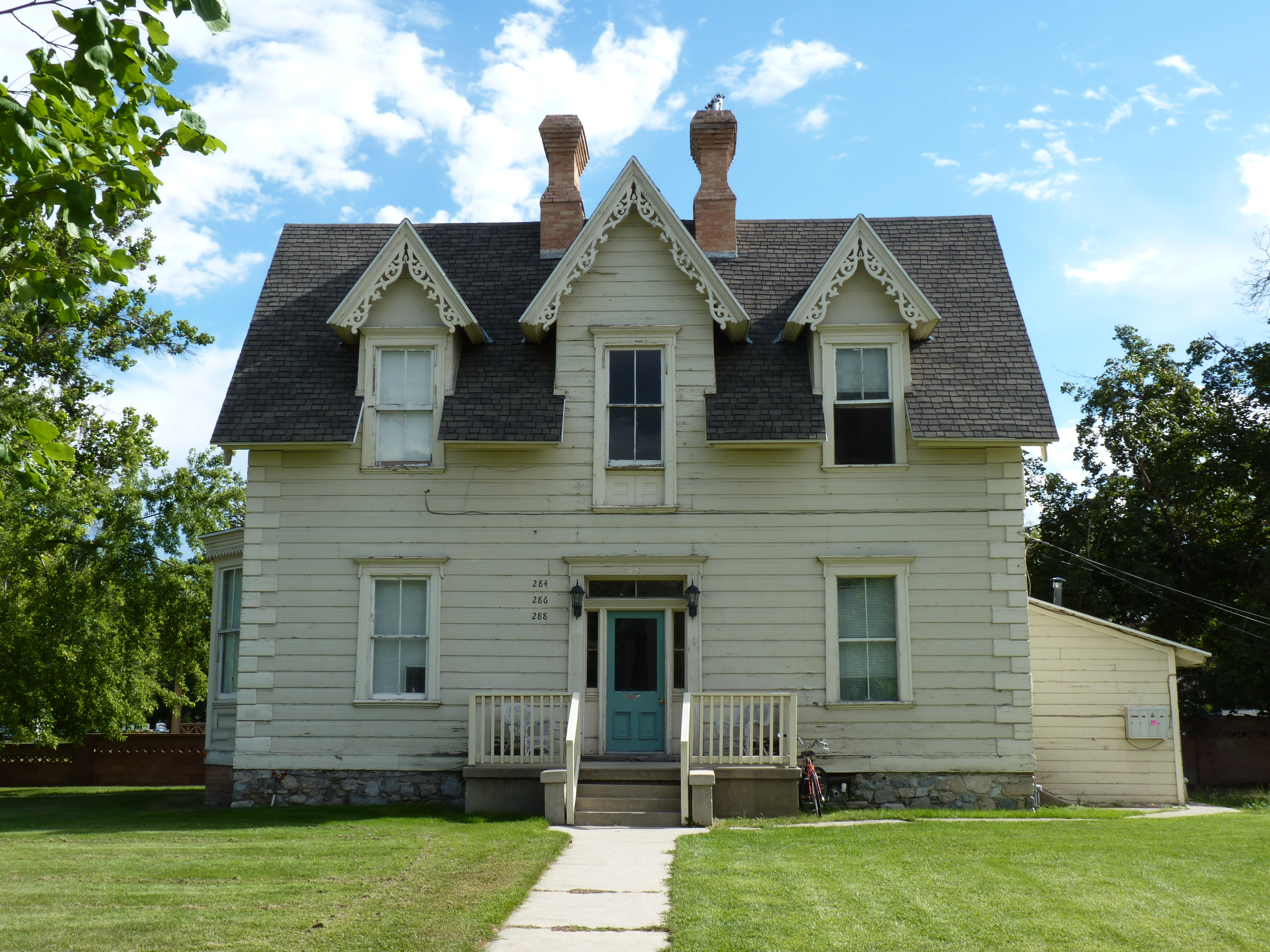
- George M. Brown House, August 2011

- Location within Utah Location within the United States
- Location: 284 East 100 North; Provo, Utah; United States
- Coordinates: 40°14′6″N 111°39′10″W
- Area: less than one acre
- Built: 1884
- Architectural style: Greek Revival, Gothic Revival
- NRHP reference No.: 82001759
- Added to NRHP: December 1, 1982

The George M. Brown House is a historic residence in Provo, Utah, United States, that is listed on the National Register of Historic Places. It was built as a home for a "polygamous wife" of lawyer George M. Brown. It is listed on the National Register of Historic Places.

== Description ==
The house is located at 284 East 100 North, within the Provo East Central Historic District, it was built in the 1880s, on property obtained from Abraham O. Smoot. This is a two-story, central-hall, vernacular type house. “The Brown House exhibits the verticality and decorative jigsaw work usually found in the Gothic Revival, but displays the horizontal siding, simulated quoins, and symmetry of the local building tradition." The house was designated to the Provo Historic Landmarks Registry on March 21, 1996. Though built during the Victorian era, the George M. Brown House is a distinguished example of carpenter Gothic architecture. Containing thin wooden tracery, a monochromatic color scheme, and steep gables as well as other features, the Gothic style is very evident in this home. Builders' increased focus on expenses, particularly the price of stone, led to the emergence of the Carpenter Gothic style. “The Brown home attempts to combine the best of two generations with its asymmetrical Victorian east elevation and its symmetrical, dormered north elevation which contains nearly all the elements of typical pioneer homes of the mid-1870s (Roberts p. 2).” Decorative elements on the home include bargeboards, Quoins, a bay window, chimneys, window trim, door trim, dormers, a cornice, siding, and windows.

== George M. Brown ==
Born on April 5, 1842, in Macedonia, Illinois, George Mortimer Brown settled in Utah with his family in 1842. A member of the Church of Jesus Christ of Latter-day Saints, George served a mission to Norway in 1866, the same year he began his marriage to Elizabeth Olsen. After his mission, George became an attorney. In addition to Elizabeth, George married two more women - Amelia West and Pearl Wilson. Shortly after the initial construction of the home, Brown's first wife attained the title to it, and Brown and his two other wives and children left and settled in Colonia Díaz, a Mormon settlement in Mexico. He ran a store there until he died on July 6, 1894.

== Present ==
The home Brown left for his first wife remained in the family until 1958, when G. Rulon Morgan obtained the property. Don R. Milner became the owner in 1971, and now the home is in the possession of Arnel Milner. The home has now been converted into apartment space.

== See also ==
- National Register of Historic Places listings in Utah County, Utah
