= James P. Aykroyd =

American composer (1800–1835)

James P. Aykroyd (1800– July 1835 in Nashville, Tennessee) was an early American composer, arranger, and music educator of piano, organ, and voice in New Bern, North Carolina, Raleigh, North Carolina, and Nashville, Tennessee. He also owned a general store — first in New Bern, then in Nashville — selling dry goods, groceries, sheet music, and musical instruments – including pianos. In New Bern, Aykroyd was the organist and choir director at the 1824 dedication of the then newly constructed Christ Episcopal Church.

== Music in North Carolina ==
In nearly every North Carolina village where there was an academy there was also a music teacher, an art teacher, and sometimes a dancing teacher. In some of these towns, such as New Bern, Raleigh, Greensboro, and Wilmington, there were music teachers independent of academy patronage. Aykroyd's general store was "One door North of the Bank of Newbern."

Aykroyd, as early as August 11, 1821, advertised in the Newbern Sentinel:

The inhabitants of Newbern are respectfully informed that JAMES AYKROYD, Professor of Instrumental and Vocal Music, contemplates establishing himself in Newbern, the ensuing November, as a Teacher of those Sciences, and respectfully solicits a portion of publick patronage. His terms will be moderate.

Piano Fortes and other musical instruments, warranted to be of the best quality, together with every description of Music, can be had by leaving orders with John W. Guion, Esq. N.B. Piano Fortes, &c. tuned and repaired by J.A.

— July 28—eow t1 Nov.—175

In 1823, Aykroyd, then of New Bern, "respectfully informed the citizens of Hillsboro and its vicinity that he intended giving lessons in music there during the summer months." His terms were "for the Piano, twelve dollars a quarter, for lessons every other week; and three dollars for vocal music, two lessons every other week."

In 1826, Aykroyd posted an announcement in the Raleigh Register:

J. AYKROYD,
PROFESSOR OF MUSIC,
From Newbern
RESPECTFULLY informs the inhabitants of Raleigh, that, agreeably to the purpose which he made known in a former advertisement, he has arrived here and will commence the duties of his profession as soon as a sufficient number of pupils shall be obtained.
A subscription paper is left in the hands of Gen. B. Daniel.
June 7, 1826
— Raleigh Register, June 13, 1826

In Nashville, until his death in 1835, Aykroyd had a large music store on Union Street, near the Union Bank.

== Selected compositions ==
- The Siren: A Collection of Sacred Music, edited and arranged by James Aykroyd, published by G.E. Blake, Philadelphia (1822) OCLC 55853682
- "How Dear to the Heart," sung by Mrs. French, published by G.E. Blake, Philadelphia
  - Poetry by Stephen Mitchell Chester, Esq. (1793–1862), composed for and dedicated to Miss Mary Taylor
- "Yet Stay Awhile," with variations for the Piano Forte of Harp, published by G.E. Blake, Philadelphia
  - Composed for and dedicated to Miss Henrietta B. Smith, (Note: Miss Henrietta B. Smith of New Bern, North Carolina, married John B. Carroll (died 1837) of New York on January 2, 1836. (Christ Church Parish Marriage Records Archived 2014-10-19 at the Wayback Machine, New Bern, North Carolina)) by J. Aykroyd; the poetry is original
- The American and New Orleans Favorite Waltzes for the Piano Forte, published by G.E. Blake, Philadelphia OCLC 22050150 OCLC 726900766
  - Composed & respectfully dedicated to Miss Caroline Chapman, by J. Aykroyd

From the Thomas Alva Edison Collection of American Sheet, Music Library of the University of Michigan

- The broken vow, or, Theodosius to Constantia: sung by Mrs. French published by G.E. Blake, Philadelphia (1824) OCLC 42779455
- The Pirate Lover, sung by Mrs. French, published by G.E. Blake, Philadelphia (1824) OCLC 78192158 OCLC 367910292 OCLC 81286374
  - Poetry by James Gates Percival, music composed and respectfully inscribed to Mrs. J. A. Brown by J. Aykroyd
- The Tell Tale Eye, sung by Mrs. French, published by G.E. Blake, Philadelphia (1824) OCLC 42779459

== Sample sheet music that Aykroyd sold ==
Aykroyd used an ink stamp to identify himself as a music dealer on the sheet music he sold. It read:

Sold by JAMES AYKROYD, Teacher of Music, New Bern. Where are sold, Music and Instruments of every description.

A sample of the sheet music sold and stamp he used is at the Music Library of the University of North Carolina at Chapel Hill; viz: "The Blue Bell of Scotland," with variations for the piano forte or harp (a new edition) by Jean Tatton Latour (1776–1840), published by George E. Blake, Philadelphia

== Musical family ==
James married Elizabeth Bettner on July 12, 1824, in New Bern, North Carolina. Elizabeth was a music teacher in both New Bern and Nashville.

James and Elizabeth Aykroyd had four children, all born in New Bern:

1. Julia Blake Aykroyd, (born 21 July 1825; died 28 July 1825 New Bern)
2. William James Aykroyd (born 28 July 1827; died 5 November 1832, Nashville)
3. Eliza Jones Aykroyd (born 11 December 1828)
4. Maria Caroline Aykroyd (born 20 June 1831)

Eliza and Maria taught music. Eliza was the founding head of music (1890) at what now is the University of North Texas College of Music.

== Miscellany ==
Aykroyd is listed as an 1823 member of the Dialectic Society.

== Death ==
Aykroyd died in early July 1835 in Nashville "from the effects of laudanum" and was buried July 5, 1935. The community held a benefit for his children, for which an announcement was posted in the Nashville Banner and Nashville Whig, October 12, 1835.
