= Hendrix College =

Private college in Conway, Arkansas, US

Coordinates: 35°06′00″N 92°26′24″W

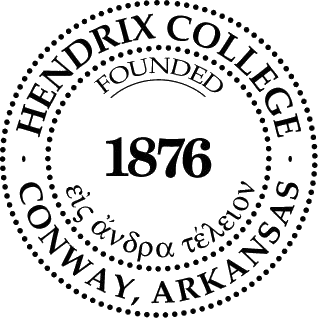
- Former names: Central Institute (1876–1881); Central Collegiate Institute (1881–1889); Hendrix College (1889–1929); Hendrix-Henderson College (1929–1930); Trinity College (1930)
- Motto: εἰς ἄνδρα τέλειον (Ancient Greek)
- Motto in English: Unto the whole person
- Type: Private liberal arts college
- Established: 1876; 150 years ago
- Accreditation: HLC
- Religious affiliation: United Methodist Church
- Academic affiliations: Space-grant
- Endowment: $200.7 million (2019)
- President: Karen Petersen
- Faculty: 91 full-time and 24 part-time (spring 2023)
- Students: 1,120 (fall 2023)
- Location: Conway, Arkansas, U.S.
- Campus: Suburban
- Colors: Hendrix Orange and Black
- Nickname: The Warriors
- Sporting affiliations: NCAA Division III – SCAC
- Mascot: Altus the Warrior
- Website: hendrix.edu

Hendrix College is a private liberal arts college in Conway, Arkansas. Approximately 1,000 students are enrolled, mostly undergraduates. While affiliated with the United Methodist Church, the college offers a secular curriculum and has a student body composed of people from many different religious backgrounds. Hendrix is a member of the Associated Colleges of the South.

== History ==
Hendrix College was founded as a primary school called "Central Institute" in 1876 at Altus, Arkansas, by Rev. Isham L. Burrow. In 1881 it was renamed "Central Collegiate Institute" when secondary and collegiate departments were added. The next year the first graduating collegiate class, composed of three women, were awarded Mistress of English Literature degrees. In 1884, three conferences of the Methodist Episcopal Church, South purchased the school. This began the school's relationship with the Methodist Episcopal Church, South and later The Methodist Church and the United Methodist Church. The Central Collegiate Institute was renamed "Hendrix College" in 1889 in honor of Rev. Eugene Russell Hendrix, a presiding bishop over three Arkansas Methodist conferences. This same year, the primary school was discontinued.

Hendrix College was initially designated a male college, but by the time of the name change in 1889, the college allowed for the enrollment of women who were interested in the college's course of study. In 1890, after receiving bids from seven other Arkansas towns, the Hendrix Board of Trustees chose Conway as the new location for the college. College literary societies thrived at Hendrix from the 1890s through the 1930s, and they included the Harlan Literary Society, its rival—the Franklin Literary Society, and for women—the Hypatian Literary Society. Secondary education was discontinued in 1925. In 1929 the college merged with Henderson-Brown College, a private school in Arkadelphia, Arkansas now known as Henderson State University, which briefly created "Hendrix-Henderson College". Two years later the name reverted to Hendrix College. The merger resulted in Hendrix Bull Dogs becoming the Hendrix Warriors, and the college newspaper, the Bull Dog, being renamed the College Profile.

The newly expanded college planned to move to Little Rock, Arkansas, but the city of Conway was able to raise $150,000 to keep the school. In 1930 the name was briefly changed to Trinity College but reverted to Hendrix College after opposition by students, alumni and townspeople. The financially troubled "Galloway Woman's College" in Searcy, Arkansas was absorbed by Hendrix in 1933 during the Great Depression.

Dr. Karen K Peterson became the college’s thirteenth president on June 1, 2023.

=== Presidents ===
- 2023–present: Karen K. Petersen
- 2020–2023: W. Ellis Arnold III
- 2014–2019: William M. Tsutsui
- 2001–2013: J. Timothy Cloyd
- 1992–2001: Ann H. Die
- 1981–1991: Joe B. Hatcher
- 1969–1981: Roy Shilling Jr.
- 1958–1969: Marshall T. Steel
- 1945–1958: Matt L. Ellis
- 1913–1945: John H. Reynolds
- 1902–1910: Stonewall Anderson
- 1887–1902, 1910–1913: Alexander C. Millar
- 1884–1887: Isham L. Burrow

== Student life ==
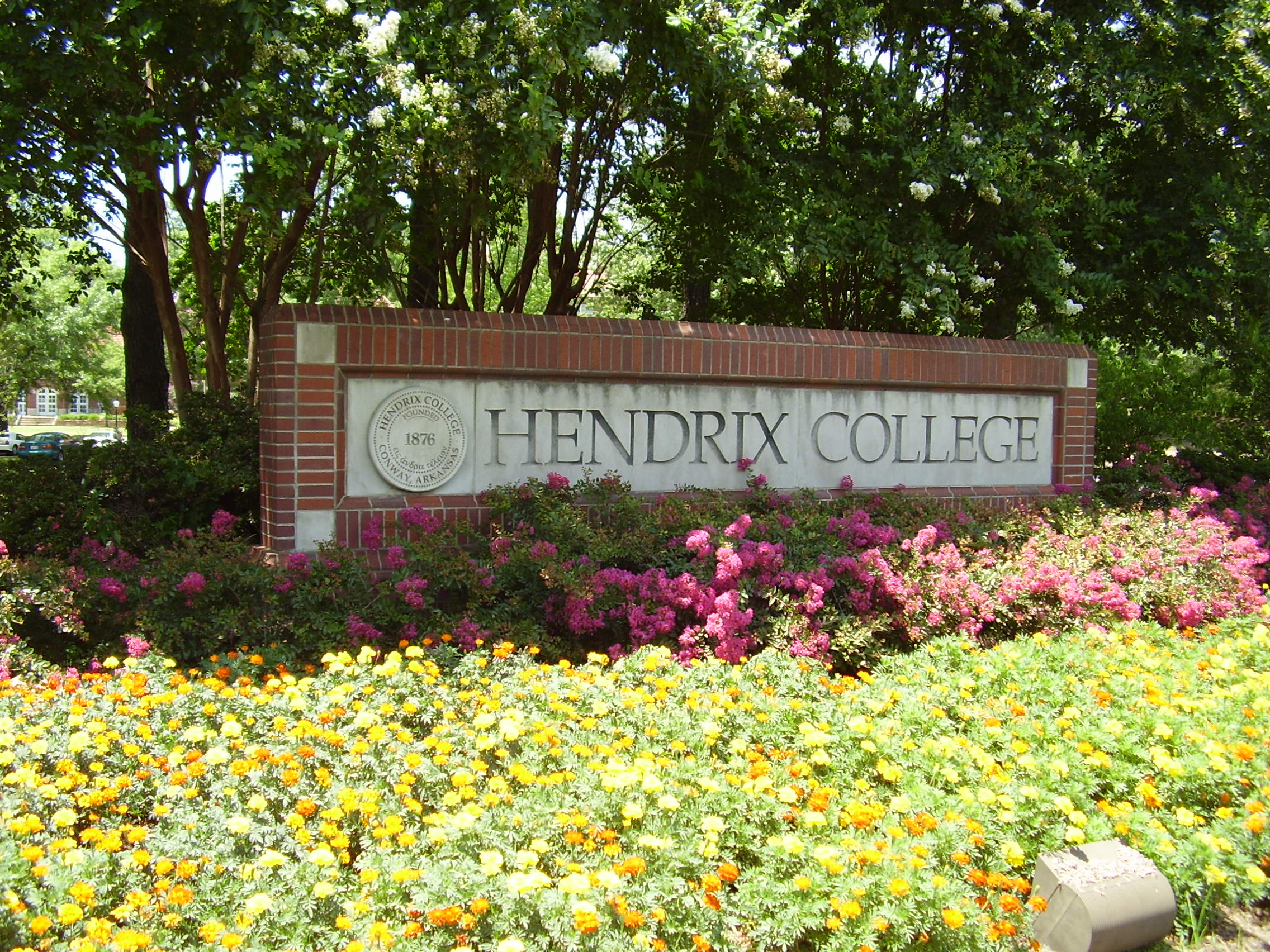
The main entrance of Hendrix College

Hendrix is a primarily undergraduate institution with 34 majors and 38 minors, including a master's of accounting degree. The student body is about 1400, with students coming from most U.S. states and from over a dozen foreign countries. Notable are the Rwandan Presidential Scholars. Hendrix is the lead institution in a consortium of 19 private and public higher education institutions that together host over 220 students from Rwanda.

The Student Senate is the governing body of the student association. It has officers that are elected campus-wide along with representatives from each class, residence hall and apartment building.

Hendrix has no social fraternities or sororities. There are 65 student organizations that offer a wide range of activities, funded by a student activity fee. The largest student organization is Social Committee, or SoCo, which plans the major events on campus. The Office of Student Activities organizes weekend and Wednesday evening events. Major social events are usually held in "The Brick Pit," an outdoor area in the center of the campus. The most famous event is "Shirttails," a freshman dance-off that includes a serenade by the men's dorms.

Hendrix College has its own radio station. Founded in 1971 and first broadcasting in 1973, KHDX-FM 93.1 is Hendrix College's student-run radio station, with a 10-watt broadcast that reaches Hendrix Campus and the surrounding Conway area. Additionally, as of 2017, KHDX Radio is a founding member of the Arkansas College Radio Association.

== Athletics ==
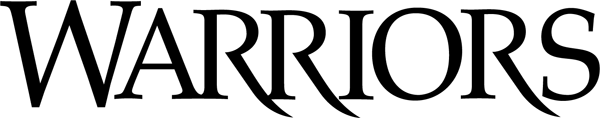
Hendrix athletics wordmark

Hendrix College teams, nicknamed the Warriors, participate as a member of the National Collegiate Athletic Association's Division III. The Warriors were a charter member of the new Southern Athletic Association (SAA), founded in 2011, after formerly being a member of the Southern Collegiate Athletic Conference (SCAC). They would later re-join the Southern Collegiate Athletic Conference in the 2025–26 academic year.

Men's sports include baseball, basketball, cross country, football (added back in 2013 after being discontinued in 1960), golf, lacrosse, soccer, swimming & diving, tennis and track & field; while women's sports include basketball, cross country, field hockey, golf, lacrosse, soccer, softball, swimming & diving, tennis, track & field and volleyball.

== Recognition ==
Academic rankings

Liberal arts
- U.S. News & World Report: 93
- Washington Monthly: 119

National
- Forbes: 339
- WSJ/College Pulse: 261

In fall 2013, Hendrix was recognized as one of the country's top "Up and Coming" liberal arts colleges for the sixth consecutive year by U.S. News & World Report. The 2014 US News Best Colleges guide lists Hendrix as No. 11 in a group of liberal arts colleges that demonstrate "A Strong Commitment to Teaching." Hendrix is the only Arkansas institution to appear in the 2014 US News Best Colleges ranking of the top 100 private national liberal arts colleges. Hendrix was listed among the top liberal arts colleges "based on their contribution to the public good" by Washington Monthly. Hendrix is among the country's top 100 most financially fit private colleges, according to a list published by Forbes magazine and is ranked No. 158 on the magazine's list of America's Top Colleges and No. 115 in a list of private colleges in the nation." Hendrix is among the top colleges profiled in The Princeton Review's The Best 378 Colleges (2014). Hendrix was selected for inclusion in the Fiske Guide to Colleges 2014 based on academic ratings, price category, and quality of student life on campus.

Hendrix was named in 2010 as one of "The Top 50 Schools That Produce Science PhDs" by CBS MoneyWatch.com which compiled its rankings using data from The National Science Foundation. The Institute of International Education awarded Hendrix with a 2012 Andrew Heiskell Award for International Exchange Partnerships as project coordinators of the Rwanda Presidential Scholars Program. Hendrix has ties with Rwanda going back to 2007, and in 2019 announced annual assistance to two graduates of Gashora Girls Academy of Science and Technology to attend Hendrix.

== Campus buildings ==
There are 36 buildings on campus, three of which are listed on the National Register of Historic Places (NRHP). Since the mid-1990s, the college has pursued a master plan for campus construction, developed in consultation with the architectural design firm Duany Plater-Zyberk & Co.

=== Academic and administrative buildings ===
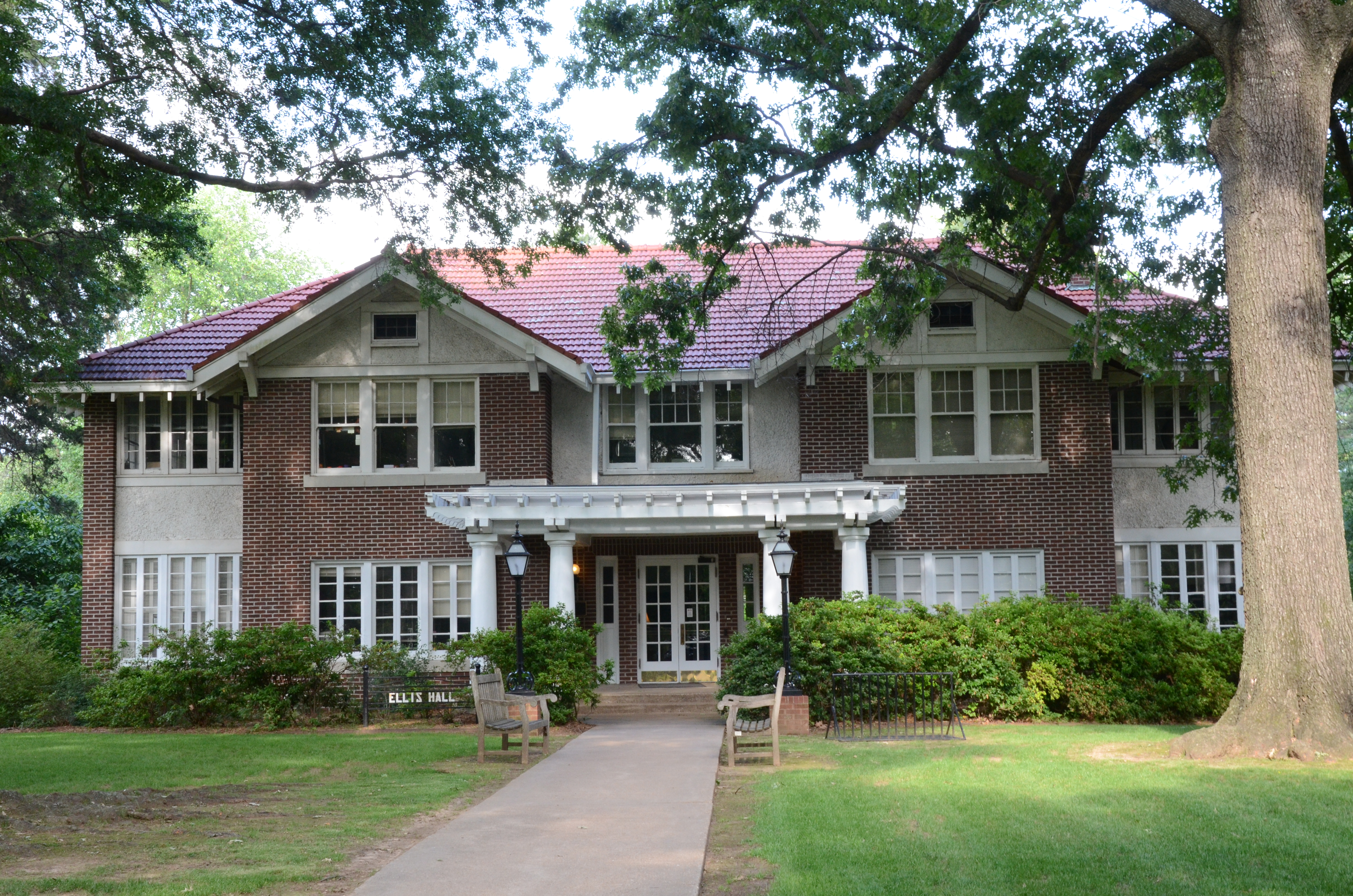
Ellis Hall

- Admin Houses: Health services, counseling services, Marketing and Communications offices.
- Art Complex: Art department.
- Charles D. Morgan Center for Physical Sciences/Acxiom Hall: Chemistry department, Physics department, Mathematics and Computer Science department.
- Olin C. Bailey Library
- Buhler Hall: Vacant due to the addition of the Student Life and Technology Center.
- Mary Ann and David Dawkins Welcome Center: Office of Admission, Financial Aid.
- Donald W. Reynolds Center for Life Sciences: Biology department, Psychology department.
- Ellis Hall: Philosophy department, Religious Studies department; listed on the National Register of Historic Places (NRHP).
- Fausett Hall: Office of Administration, English department, Foreign Language departments.
- Greene Chapel: School's official chapel, venue for annual Candlelight Carol service.
- I.T.: Information technology offices
- Mills Center: Cabe Theater, Economics and Business department, Education department, History department, Politics and International Relations department, Sociology and Anthropology department.
- Bertie Wilson Murphy Building: Hendrix-Murphy Foundation.
- Physical Plant: (Originally built as short-term housing and called "East Hall")
- Public Safety: Mainly deals with security and parking issues.
- Staples Auditorium: Large auditorium, also houses Greene Chapel.
- Trieschmann Building: Music department, Dance studio, Reves Recital Hall, and Trieschmann gallery.
- Student Life and Technology Center: Office of Student Affairs, Social Committee, Master Calendar, cafeteria, the Burrow (student deli), Oathout Technology Center (computer lab), IT Help Desk, Odyssey, and Career Services. It also contains all student activities and organization offices, the KHDX radio station, the Religious Life Suite, Residence Life offices and the post office.

=== Residence halls ===
- Apartments on Clifton Street
- Couch Hall: Co-ed residence hall named after Arkansas entrepreneur Harvey Couch.
- The Hendrix Corner Apartments: Apartments at the intersection of Front Street and Mill Street. (also called the Mill Street Apartments)
- Front Street Apartments: Apartments at the intersection of Front Street and Spruce Street.
- Galloway Hall: Female residence hall (NRHP) named to honor Bishop Charles Betts Galloway and listed on the U.S. National Register of Historic Places
- Hardin Hall: Male residence hall whose namesake, G.C. Hardin, was a 1905 graduate.
- Huntington Apartments: College-owned apartments on Clifton Street.
- Martin Hall: Male residence hall (NRHP) named in honor of Conway civic leader Capt. W. W. Martin, who worked to bring Hendrix to Conway
- The Houses: Four co-ed residence houses: Cook, Dickinson, McCreight, and Browne.
- Brown House and Stella Boyle Smith House (commonly Smith House): Two co-ed residential houses close to The Houses.
- Language House: Single-language themed co-ed house. Rotates annually among French, German, and Spanish.
- Raney Hall: Female residence hall named in 1960 for Alton B. Raney, a former trustee of the college.
- Veasey Hall: Female residence hall named to honor former trustee Ruth Veasey.
- The Market Square Three mixed-use buildings with commercial space on the ground floors and student apartments on the upper floors, part of the Village at Hendrix, a New Urban-style housing development project.
- Miller Creative Quad co-ed dormitory on the second and third floors above the Windgate Museum of Art

=== Recreational buildings ===
- Wellness and Athletics Center: Houses the Physical Education department, basketball courts, a swimming pool, a free weights room, lacrosse field, an indoor track, a soccer field, and a baseball field. The area between the building and the sports fields is designated Young-Wise Memorial Plaza and houses the Young Memorial and sculptures to honor alumni who died in Afghanistan. The underpass nearby, which connects the building to the main campus and runs under Harkrider Street, is the location of an interactive art exhibit by Christopher Janney titled Harmonic Fugue.

== Notable alumni and faculty ==
- Ashlie Atkinson: film, television, and stage actress
- Charles R. Attwood: pediatrician and author
- Douglas Blackmon: journalist and bureau chief with the Wall Street Journal; 2009 Pulitzer Prize winner
- Roby Brock: Media executive and host of Talk Business and Politics
- Matthew Brown, member of the Arkansas House of Representatives
- W. R. Bumpers: member of the Arkansas House of Representatives
- John Burkhalter: businessman, former chairman of the Arkansas Economic Development Commission and the Arkansas Highway Commission
- Gloria Cabe: politician and political advisor
- Sarah Caldwell: notable opera conductor; first female conductor of the Metropolitan Opera in New York City; winner in 1996 of the National Medal of Arts
- Natalie Canerday: actress; notable roles in Sling Blade and October Sky
- Hayes Carll: country singer-songwriter; Americana Music Award winner
- Clint Catalyst: writer, spoken-word performer, journalist
- Jay Dickey: former Congressman; author of the Dickey Amendment
- Delzie Demaree: Botanist and plant collector.
- Betty Jo Teeter Dobbs: Science historian
- Susan Dunn: opera singer
- Timothy Davis Fox: judge in the Sixth Judicial Circuit of the State of Arkansas
- Randy Goodrum: songwriter whose credits include "You Needed Me"
- Tim Griffin: Attorney General of Arkansas, U.S. Representative for the Second District of Arkansas, interim U.S. Attorney, Justice Department official, aide to Karl Rove
- Dana Falconberry: singer-songwriter
- Ann Die Hasselmo: president of Hendrix College 1992–2001
- Doyle Overton Hickey: Army officer who served in World War I, World War II, and the Korean War
- Missy Irvin: adjunct professor of dance at Hendrix; current Republican member of Arkansas State Senate from Mountain View
- Lee Johnson, American politician from Arkansas
- Rock F. Jones: president of Ohio Wesleyan University
- Benjamin Travis Laney: 33rd governor of Arkansas
- Craig Leipold: Owner of the NHL Minnesota Wild
- Derek Lowe: pharmaceutical researcher
- Jo Luck: former CEO of Heifer International, a world hunger organization
- Jay McDaniel: Professor of Religion, who is known in academic circles for process theology and ecological theology
- Wilbur D. Mills: former U.S. Representative for the Second District of Arkansas (1939–1977), Chair of the House Ways and Means Committee, played a large role in the creation of Medicare
- Jim Moore: Major League Baseball player
- Robert L. Moore: Jungian psychoanalyst, professor at Chicago Theological Seminary
- Benjamin Nichols: lead singer/songwriter for rock band Lucero
- Paula Norwood: American statistician, vice president at Johnson & Johnson, chair of Biopharmaceutical Section of the American Statistical Association
- Steven Ozment: McLean Professor of Ancient and Modern History at Harvard University and author of A Mighty Fortress: A New History of the German People
- Margaret Pittman: first female head of a National Institute of Health laboratory and pioneer in developing the vaccine for pertussis
- William Ragsdale: actor, star of movie Fright Night and television series Herman's Head
- Dan C. Rizzie: artist, author, musician, and recipient of distinguished alumni award.
- John E. Sanders: Christian theologian and author
- Tommy Sanders: Sportscaster and host of ESPN Outdoors
- Benjamin Schumacher: U.S. theoretical physicist, known for contributions to field of quantum information including development of what is now known as Schumacher compression
- P. Allen Smith: garden designer
- Mary Steenburgen: Academy Award-winning actress, wife of Ted Danson; she left during her second year
- Trenton Lee Stewart: author of The Mysterious Benedict Society books
- Joe Stroud: editor for 25 years of the Detroit Free Press
- Barkley Thompson: Episcopal priest and dean of Christ Church Cathedral, the cathedral church of the Episcopal Diocese of Texas
- Wallace Townsend: (Class of 1902): Arkansas Republican national committeeman from 1928 to 1961; Republican gubernatorial candidate in 1916 and 1920
- Joan Wagnon: Former Kansas state representative, (1983–1995), mayor of Topeka, (1997–2001) and Kansas Secretary of Revenue, (2003–2011)
- John N. Whitaker: Neurologist and immunologist who researched multiple sclerosis
- Dib Williams: Major League Baseball player
- Billy Roy Wilson: federal judge
- Winston P. Wilson: Major General (USAF) and Chief of the National Guard Bureau
- Jeremy Wise: Navy SEAL and CIA Contractor killed in Camp Chapman attack
