= Dorothy Sproule =

Canadian poet (1867–1963)

- Born: Dorothy Maria Corrigan; November 4, 1867; Dundas County, Ontario, Canada
- Died: January 2, 1963 (aged 95); Montreal, Quebec, Canada
- Spouse: Frederick H. Sproule (m. 1887; died 1924)
- Children: 3
- Writing career
- Language: English
- Notable works: Bread and Roses (1937)

Dorothy Sproule (November 4, 1867 – January 2, 1963) was a Canadian poet and civic leader, recognized for her literary contributions and her engagement in Montreal's cultural and social life. Her work often commemorated nature, the seasons, and national events, including coronations and royal visits, earning her recognition from members of the British royal family.

== Early life ==
Dorothy Maria Corrigan was born in Dundas County, Ontario, to Alva James Corrigan, a rural postmaster, and Mary Catherine Sipes. Her family was of United Empire Loyalist descent. She was one of five children, four of whom survived childhood. Her father was active in Tory politics and maintained close friendships with Ontario Premier Sir James Whitney and Prime Minister R. B. Bennett.

Sproule attended Albert College in Belleville, Ontario, and Stanstead College in Quebec, graduating with honours as Mistress of English Literature.

In 1887, she married Methodist minister Frederick Henry Sproule. Together they had three sons, including one who died of tubercular meningitis at the age of seven months. During her early married life, she lived in rural Ontario in modest clergy housing. For four years, the family lived in Kingston, Ontario.

== Literary career ==
Sproule began writing poetry in earnest following the death of her husband in 1924 and youngest son Hubert Douglas in 1930. Over a writing career spanning more than three decades, she published eight books of poetry, and contributed essays and poems to newspapers and periodicals such as The Crucible (Toronto), Notebook Magazine (Cleveland, Ohio), Great Thoughts Magazine (London), and Visions Magazine (California). Her works often explored nature, the four seasons, holidays, and notable state occasions.

Over her career, she received letters from various members of the British royal family, including the five monarchs from Edward VII to Elizabeth II, leading to her being described as the "Canadian Poet-Laureate to Royalty". She wrote a poem to commemorate the Silver Jubilee of George V. In 1937, her "Coronation Ode", for which she was awarded the Coronation Medal, was broadcast by the BBC at the coronation of George VI. She also received personal acknowledgement from Queen Elizabeth II for her poems "The Crown Still Stands", written for the Queen's Coronation in 1953, and "Welcome to Royalty", for the Queen's 1959 tour of Canada.

Sproule received a Gold Medal from the New York World's Fair Poetry Competition, awarded for the best poem from Canada. In 1949, she won the Schroeder Foundation Medal for Literature.

== Civic engagement ==
Beyond her literary career, Sproule was an active clubwoman and civic leader in Montreal. She founded and served as the first president of the Notre-Dame-de-Grâce Women's Club and the Women's Conservative Association of Notre-Dame-de-Grâce, and was elected Delegate-at-Large to the National Convention in Winnipeg. She was a charter member of the Women's Canadian Club, held leadership roles in the Montreal Council of Women and the Big Sisters' Association of Canada, and was a member of the Royal Empire Society, the Westmount Women's Club, the Montreal Women's Club, the Women's Art Society, and the Art Association of Montreal.

As a resident of Notre-Dame-de-Grâce, she initiated a variety of local reforms, including organizing Girl Guides units, establishing health clinics for babies, and co-ordinating Poppy Day commemorations.

== Later life and death ==
Sproule lived alone in a Crescent Street apartment for 35 years, maintaining her own household and continuing to write a poem per week well into her nineties. In her later years, she wrote using dark crayons on large cardboard sheets due to declining eyesight.

She died at her home on January 2, 1963, at the age of 95. At the time, The New York Times described her as "one of Canada's best known poets". She was survived by her son Frederic Arnold Sproule, five grandchildren, and twelve great-grandchildren.

== Books ==
- The Mystic Star. Montreal: Mercury Press. 1931.
- Poems of Life. Montreal: Mercury Press. 1931. With an introduction by Lloyd C. Douglas.
- The Golden Goal. 1933.
- Earth and Stars. Montreal: Mercury Press. 1935.
- Bread and Roses. Montreal: Woodward Press. 1937.
- The Gold of Dawn. Poems. New York: Harrison. 1938.
- The Cloud and the Fire. Montreal. 1940.
- The Silver Cloud. Montreal: de la Salle Print. 1942.
