= Boscobel College =

Former women's college in Nashville, Tennessee

Boscobel College for Young Ladies was a college in Nashville, founded in 1889 as the Nashville Baptist Female College by the Tennessee Baptist Convention. The college operated for twenty-five years — until 1916. One of its founding objectives was to provide the lowest possible cost for higher-education of young women.

The school, at its peak in the 1890s, had over 100 female students, many of whom were boarders. In 1898, Boscobel advertised its literary faculty and music and art advantages as unsurpassed, and promised to prepare young ladies for life's work and its duties.

== Campus ==
The campus was built around an East Nashville mansion, formerly owned by Anna Shelby Barrow. The mansion was constructed of blue-burned brick with marble mantles from Italy and stood atop a tree-covered hill overlooking the Cumberland River. The campus covered ten wooded acres on Sevier Street near South Seventh Street (then called Foster Street), south of Sylvan Street.

Boscobal was the same name given to the property by John Shelby, who built the original mansion for his daughter, Anna Shelby Barrow.

In June 1917, the property became home to the National Baptist Seminary and Missionary Training School, which functioned until 1931. In 1940 the buildings were razed and sold for scrap. Much of the site of the old school is now the James A. Cayce Homes, Nashville 's oldest and largest public housing development.

== Closing of the college ==
Boscobel College closed in 1916 on account of the East Nashville fire. Other local schools for women closed during this same era, including Radnor College in 1914, Buford College in 1920, Columbia's Athenaeum college in 1907, and Franklin's Tennessee Female College in 1913.

== People ==
Presidents

- 1891: J.P. Hamilton, M.E.L., A.B., A.M., 1857 graduate of Southwestern Baptist University, Jackson, Mississippi
- 1892–1993: John Galen Paty (1860–1931)
- 1893: Zuinglius Calvin Graves (1816–1906)
- 1895–1897: John Galen Paty (1860–1931)
- 1897: Henry G. Lamar Sr. (born 1845) was also a professor at Boscobel; before 1997, he had been the business manager for Southern Female University in Birmingham, Alabama
- 1899–1904: Carey Albert Folk (1867–1957) graduated from Richmond College and attended Johns Hopkins University
- 1904–1912: Cynthia Rust (née Westfall; 1859–1925), widow of Dr. John O'Brian Rust
- 1912: Luane Everett (née Watson; 1870–1913)

Regents

- 1896–1904: Dr. John O'Brian Rust (Reverend) (1859–1904)
- 1916: Mrs. N.J. Ellis

Trustees

- 1914: Rev. William N. Lunsford (born 1870), President of the Board of Trustees
- 1914: William Hume, Secretary of the Board of Trustees

Principals

- 1893–1994: John Galen Paty (1860–1931)
- Alice Foxworthy Glasscock, Lady Principal
- Eliza Crostwait
- I.P. Hamilton

Teachers

- Mrs. Annie M. Woodall, director of the School of Expression at Boscobel College; she was a graduate Bouhy Method of Voice, Paris; the New York School of Expression; the Columbia College of Expression, Chicago; and she did special studies at the Boston School of Expression; Woodall was soloist and choir director at the Trinity Church in Nashville; she taught a year at Oxford College, Oxford, North Carolina, and taught a dozen years at the Nashville Conservatory of Music and Boscobel College
- Late 1880s (for about two years): Minnie Gattinger (1857–1944), taught fine art and German
- 1895–1896: Maria Louisa Arnold (1836–1914) was an 1859 graduate of Mary Sharp College
- 1893–1896: William Owen Carver (1842–1954), taught philosophy, Latin, Greek, German, and psychology
- 1912: Grace Boyd Kennon (1877–1962), taught ethics, philosophy, and science at Boscobel; taught Indians in the Indian Territories, married Joseph Gamett Campbell (1861–1938)
- Luane Everett (née Watson; 1870–1913)
- Ophilia Bayer (née Mitchell; 1872–1914) taught music; she was married to Julius Henry Bayer (born 1868), also a teacher
- circa 1897: Eliza Jane McKissack taught music
- 1997– : Miss C. Janes; previously had been principals at Southern Female University in Birmingham, Alabama
- 1997– : Miss E. Janes; previously had been principals at Southern Female University in Birmingham, Alabama
- 1892–1897: Minnie Gattinger (1857–1944), instructor of German and drawing at Boscobel; she studied with German-born Nashville artist, George Dury (1817–1894) and German-born American artist Carl Christian Brenner at the Academy of Fine Arts, Philadelphia, and the Académie Delécluse, Paris; exhibited works at the Salon des Champs-Élysées, 1896; was instructor of art at Judson Institute, 1891–1892; became director of the art department at Peabody College for Teachers in 1897. Her father, Augustin Gattinger, MD (1825–1903), married Josephine Dury in 1849 — sister of George Dury; George Dury was the brother of her father's wife.
- 1898– : Maud Sallee

Former students

- 1895–1896: Margaret Graves (Maria Louisa Arnold's cousin)
- Agnes Shepard Bates (1886–1912); music teacher in Earlington, Kentucky. She studied post graduate music Boscobel, although the institution had no "official" graduate program. Before attending Boscobel, she taught music at Bethel University (Tennessee).
- Verna Holt, from Nacogdoches, Texas
- Margaret M. Beatty, from Nashville
- Edith A. Roper (1874–1962) — earned an A.B. from Boscobel in 1894; she later taught science at Boscobel, Jessamine Institute (1894–1898); Boscobel College (1899); Milan, Tennessee (1900–1902); Georgetown College (Kentucky) (1902–1905); Union University, Tennessee (1906–1908); Alabama Central College (1908–1909); Howard Payne University (1909–?); Baylor College for Women
- Ellen Jane Douglas Jones Ginn (née Jones; 1878–1982), married Max Medison Ginn (died 1928) in 1903
- Mattie Pauline Martin
- Sarah Lois Grime earned a B.A. from Boscobel, and a B.S. & M.S. from Peabody College in Nashville; she retired as a faculty member of Texas A&I University in Kingsville, Texas, in 1949
- Inez Carter, graduated 1908, taught in the Latta, South Carolina, public schools
- Reine Alexander (1887–1961) went on to teach mathematics at Baton Rouge High School, then was its principal until her retirement in 1954

== Publications ==
- Salmagundi, college yearbook, Vol. 1 (1905) through Vol. 9 (1914), softcovers

== Images ==
Tennessee State Library and Archives

- Image 461
- Image 462
- Image 463
- Image 464
