= Ann Maria Thorne =

American singer

Ann Maria Thorne (née Mestayer; 1813 Philadelphia – 20 June 1881 Cornwall-on-Hudson, New York) more widely known as Mrs. French, was an early American concert singer and actress from Philadelphia. As "Mrs. French," she was among the most famous singers in America during the 1820s.

== Career ==
According to an 1896 publication, Annals of Music in Philadelphia and History of the Musical Fund Society, another singer, Mrs. Burke, had been the most famous American singer until she was outrivaled by Mrs. French. Mrs. French had studied music with Benjamin Carr, an early American composer, music publisher, and music teacher from Philadelphia. She also studied with a Henri-Noel Gilles (1778–1834), a French-born and musically educated guitarist, oboist, and composer of Philadelphia. She first appeared as a child in Philadelphia at the Chestnut Street Theatre.

== Family ==
Thorne was born Ann Maria Mestayer in a family of well-known American actors that included her parents, grandparents, siblings, husband, and children. Her parents, John Mestayer and Maria (née French; 1786–1860), were well-known Philadelphia stage and circus professionals. She married young, and before marriage, took a stage surname of "Mrs. French", borrowing her mother's maiden name. In December 1830, in Richmond, Virginia, Mestayer married Charles Robert Thorne (1814–1893), an actor. She and Charles had four sons and a daughter:

1. Neil Thorne
2. Thomas Thorne
3. Charles Robert Thorne, Jr. (1840–1883), actor
4. Edwin F. Thorne (1845–1897)
5. Emily Thorne (1850–1912), actress

A maternal aunt of Thorne, Rosalie Pelby (née French; 1792–1855) was an actress married to William Pelby (1793–1850), who, in Boston, in 1827, became the manager of the Tremont Theatre, and in 1832, built the Warren Street Theatre, and in 1836, built, founded, and managed the National Theatre.

== Selected theatres and stock companies ==
- Chestnut Street Theatre, Philadelphia
- Burton's Theatre, New York City
