= Mary Ann Browne =

English poet and writer (1812–1845)

Mary Ann Browne (also known as Mrs. James Gray; 24 September 1812 – 28 January 1845) was a prolific 19th-century English poet and writer of musical scores. She began publishing her verses at the age of fifteen, and her works include collections such as The Coronal and Sacred Poetry. In 1842, she married James Gray, a nephew of James Hogg. She was remembered for her piety and charitable nature.

== Biography ==
Mary Ann (sometimes Mary-Anne) Browne was born in Maidenhead, Berkshire, 24 September 1812. She was the eldest of three children. Though some sources mention Felicia Hemans was her sister, that is not the case.

A collection of her verses came before the public when she was only fifteen years of age. Browne wrote Mont Blanc, Ada, Repentance, The Coronal, The Birthday Gift, Ignatia, Sacred Poetry, and many fugitive pieces in periodicals.

In 1840, her family removed to Liverpool. In 1842, she married James Gray, a Scotsman, and a nephew of James Hogg. She was remembered for piety and charity.

Mary Ann Browne Gray died 28 January 1845 at Sunday's Well, Cork, Ireland. (Note: Virtue (1875) records year of death as 1844.)

== Selected works ==
=== Musical scores ===
- The captive knight : a ballad, 18--
- The messenger bird, a duett, 1826 (with George E. Blake)
- The sunset tree, Tyrolese evening hymn, 1826 (with George E Blake)
- The Pilgrim Fathers, 1827
- The recall, 1827-33 (with Charles Bradlee)
- Evening song to the Virgin, (at sea) A duett., 183- (with Edward S Mesier)
- The blue sea, song of a Greek islander in exile,, 183- (with Edward S Mesier)

=== Poetry collections ===
- Mont Blanc, and other poems by Mary Ann Browne, in her fifteenth year., 1827
- Ada, and other poems, 1828
- Repentance: And Other Poems, 1829
- The coronal; original poems, sacred and miscellaneous., 1833
- Ignatia, and other poems, 1838

=== Song collections ===
- Twelve popular songs, 18-- (with Edward F. Rimbault)

=== Songs ===
- The better land
- The breaking waves dash high
- The bridal of Andalla
- Landing of the Pilgrims
- Plymouth rock
- Treasures of the deep
