= George A.H. Blake =

American military officer (1810–1884)

George Alexander Hamilton Blake
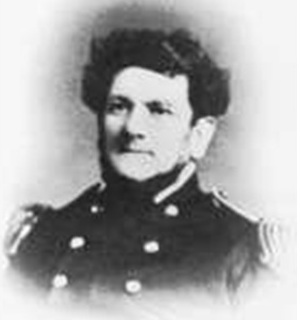
- George A.H. Blake
- Born: August 31, 1810; Philadelphia, Pennsylvania, U.S.
- Died: October 27, 1884 (aged 74); Washington, D.C., U.S.
- Burial place: Laurel Hill Cemetery, Philadelphia, Pennsylvania, U.S.
- Relatives: George E. Blake (father); George A. Blake (son)
- Military career
- Allegiance: United States; Union
- Branch: United States Army; Union Army
- Service years: 1836-1870
- Rank: Colonel, USA; Brevet Major General, USA
- Units: 2nd U.S. Dragoons; 1st U.S. Dragoons
- Commands: 1st U.S. Cavalry; 2nd Brigade, Cavalry Reserve
- Conflicts: Second Seminole War: Battle of Loxahatchee; Mexican–American War: Battle of Cerro Gordo; Battle of Puebla; Battle of Contreras; Battle of Molino del Rey; Battle of Chapultepec; Battle for Mexico City; American Indian Wars; American Civil War: Peninsula Campaign; Siege of Yorktown; Seven Days Battles; Battle of Gaines's Mill; Gettysburg campaign

George Alexander Hamilton Blake (August 31, 1810 – October 27, 1884) was an American military officer who served in the United States Army during the American Indian Wars and the Mexican–American War. He served in the Union army during the American Civil War and was brevetted Major General for his service.

== Early life and career ==
George Blake was born in Philadelphia on August 31, 1810, to English-American musician George E. Blake and Anna Margaretta Henesiem Blake. When the 2nd U.S. Regiment of Dragoons was raised in 1836, Blake received a civilian appointment and was commissioned into the army with the rank of First Lieutenant. Stationed in Florida he took part in the Second Seminole War, including the action at Fort Mellon and the Battle of Loxahatchee. Blake was promoted to Captain in 1839 and continued his service in Florida until 1841 when his command was transferred to Texas. In 1842, Blake was placed in command of Fort Washita in Durant, Oklahoma.

== Mexican–American War and Ante-Bellum ==
In 1846 Blakes' regiment, originally commanded by David E. Twiggs, participated in the Battle for Mexico City under command of Edwin Vose Sumner. Grouped into the Brigade of Dragoons under Col. William S. Harney the regiment and Captain Blake participated in the battles of Cerro Gordo, Puebla, Contreras, Molino del Rey, Chapultepec and the Battle for Mexico City. At war's end Blake, highly commended by his superiors, received a brevet promotion to Major for gallant and meritorious conduct in the affair at St. Augustine, Mexico, August 17, 1847.

Transferred to the 1st U.S. Dragoons he was promoted to full Major on July 23, 1850. Assigned to the Western Frontier, he and a mixed command of cavalry and infantry established Fort Massachusetts in the New Mexico Territory, which became the first permanent U.S. post in the state of Colorado. By 1854, he commanded Fort Burgwin and was involved in actions against Jicarilla Apaches in the region in a scouting company including explorer Kit Carson. Blake had a reputation as a harsh disciplinarian, culminating in being assaulted by several of his men on March 8, 1855. Aaron Dwight Stevens and 3 other men were sentenced to death by a court martial (the sentence was commuted by the President, though). In 1857 Blake commanded the detachment of dragoons that accompanied Lieutenant Edward Fitzgerald Beale and the United States Camel Corps on their Arizona Expedition.

== American Civil War ==
On May 3, 1861, Blake was promoted to Lieutenant Colonel and led an expedition to the west coast. Recalled to the east early in the next year he was promoted to Colonel of his regiment on February 13, 1862. His regiment became part of the cavalry reserve of the Army of the Potomac. In March, Blake was assigned to command the 2nd Cavalry Brigade by order of Maj. Gen. George B. McClellan and led it during the Peninsula Campaign. He was wounded on June 27 during the Battle of Gaines's Mill.

When Maj. Gen. Alfred Pleasonton, an old comrade with whom Blake served in 2nd Dragoons and in Mexico, took over command of the cavalry in 1863 he took Blake into his staff as his Chief Mustering Officer. After the Gettysburg campaign, in which Blake fought with his regiment, he was transferred to the Cavalry Bureau and served in administrative positions, as depot commander and on special duty for the rest of the war. He was brevetted Brigadier General in the Regular Army on March 13, 1865, for "gallant and efficient services during the Gettysburg Campaign"; and also brevetted Major General in the Regular Army for "meritorious services during the war" on the same day, though the second brevet was not confirmed until 1869.

== Later life ==
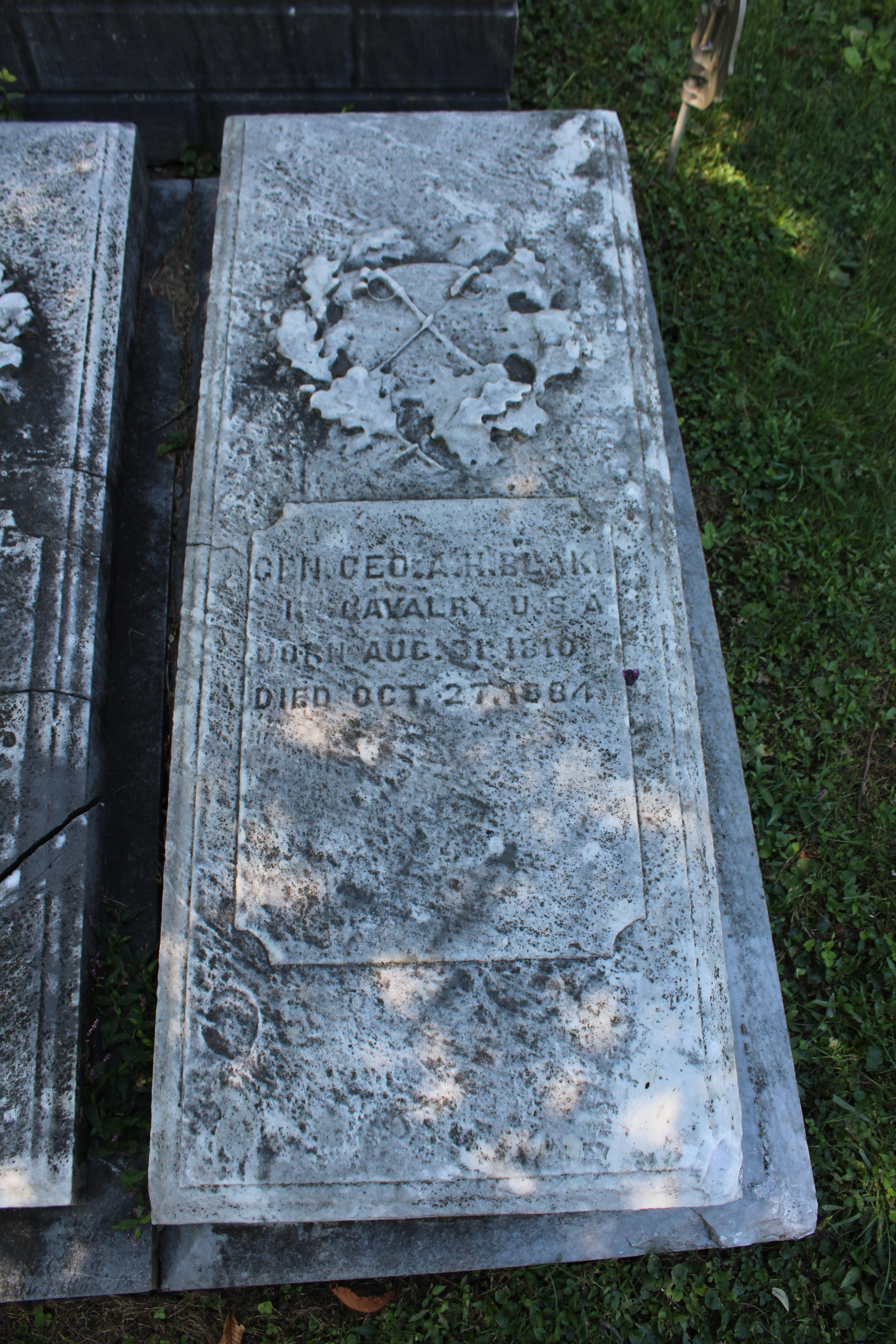
George A.H. Blake tombstone in Laurel Hill Cemetery

After the war ended Blake stayed in the army and continued to command the 1st Cavalry and Fort Vancouver in the Oregon Territory (now Washington) until his retirement on December 15, 1870. He took up residence in Washington, D.C., until his death in 1884. He was buried in Laurel Hill Cemetery in Philadelphia.

== See also ==
- List of American Civil War brevet generals (Union)
- United States Cavalry
