= Dan C. Rizzie =

American painter

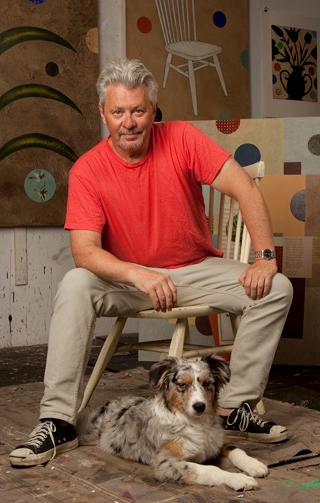
Dan Rizzie in his studio

Dan C. Rizzie, American artist and musician, was born in Poughkeepsie, NY on May 23, 1951 and grew up in India, Egypt, Jordan and Jamaica. Rizzie lives in Sag Harbor, New York.

Dan Rizzie is a painter, printmaker, and collage artist. He attended Hendrix College in Conway, Arkansas under the mentorship of Don Marr and Bill Hawes. At Hendrix he received his BFA in 1973. In 2005, Rizzie was awarded Hendrix College's Distinguished Alumnus Award. Rizzie earned a MFA from Southern Methodist University's Meadow's School of Art in Dallas, Texas in 1975.

Rizzie's works may contain layers of materials and symbolism from his varied cultural experiences.

Rizzie's art can be seen in the permanent collections of the Museum of Modern Art and the Metropolitan Museum of Art in New York, the Dallas Museum of Art, the Scottsdale Museum of Contemporary Art, the San Antonio Museum of Art, the Museum of Fine Arts, Houston and collections at AT&T Corporate Center, Chicago, Illinois, Delta Air Lines, Parrish Art Museum, and the Mayo Clinic.
