= Eliza Jane McKissack =

American music educator (1828–1900)

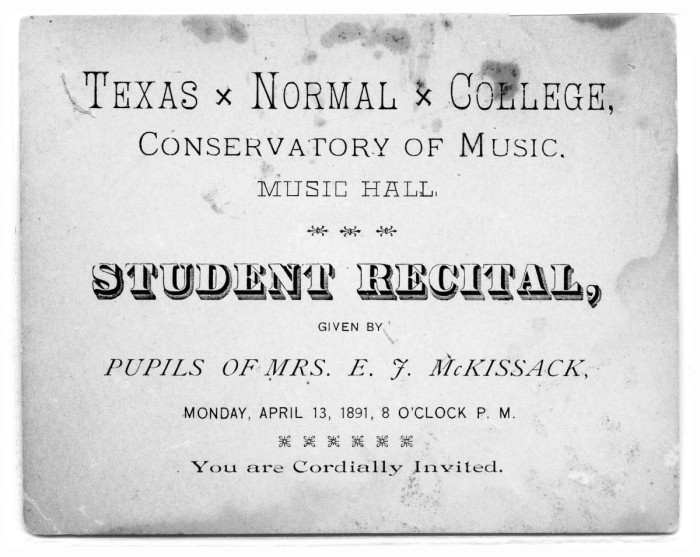
Texas Normal College Conservatory of Music (1891), from the papers of Effie Faye Branche Wright (Mrs. William Williams) (1873–1954) — Denton Public Library.

Eliza Jane McKissack (née Eliza Jones Aykroyd 11 December 1828, in New Bern, North Carolina – 15 January 1900, in Nashville, Tennessee) was a music teacher who, in 1890, became the founding head of music at the University of North Texas College of Music, then called Normal Conservatory of Music, part of Texas Normal College and Teacher Training Institute, which was founded in 1890 as a private institution. The College of Music, today, is a comprehensive school with the largest enrollment of any institution accredited by the National Association of Schools of Music. It is the oldest (and first) in the world offering a degree in jazz studies. Since the 1940s, the College of Music has been among the largest in the country.

== McKissack's qualifications ==
McKissack, from Nashville, was highly recommended for the college position – as pianist and vocalist – by Bishop Charles Quintard of Tennessee, U.S. Senator Edward C. Walthall of Grenada, Mississippi, and Orville Brewer of Chicago. She had received her musical training in Boston and New York.

McKissack remained at the college for two academic years: 1890–1891 and 1891–1892. Three years after leaving Denton, records show that McKissack studied at the New England Conservatory in the academic year 1895–1896. While there, she studied piano with Reinhold Faelten (1856–1949) and took courses in Hand Culture and Sight Playing. At that time, her permanent address was listed as Oxford, Mississippi. Her Will (probated in Davidson County, Tennessee), provides two address: 1897 – Boscobel College, Nashville; January 1899 – Oxford, Mississippi.

== Texas Normal College Conservatory of Music ==
The full course in Music, embracing both Voice and Piano, 44 weeks,
four lessons a week, and practice, together with two studies selected
from our literary course, for only $200, in advance. This includes 175
private lessons, full chorus drills, elocution, theory, class recitations
and two extra branches in the college.

— from the first bulletin for Texas Normal College, 1890

Classes at Texas Normal College first commenced Tuesday, September 16, 1890.

Teachers at the Conservatory

- John Moore (1867–1948) taught an ambitious array of engineering classes, but also taught voice and harmony. Upon arriving at Texas Normal College in 1890, Moore held a B.S. from one college and a B.A. from Lebanon College (National Normal University, in existence from 1855 to 1917), Lebanon, Ohio, in engineering, mathematics, and surveying. He then studied at the Universities of Leipzig and Heidelberg from 1894 to 1895, and received a PhD from Yale in 1895. His dissertation, Studies of Fatigue, was published in studies from the Yale Psychological Laboratory. He then received a D.D. from Central College in Missouri. In May 1918, he became a bishop of the Methodist Episcopal Church South in Dallas.
- Joshua Crittenden Chilton (1852–1896), the college's founding president, taught music history and theory of sound.

The 1890 catalog listed piano, organ, and voice, all offered through private lessons.

The college, during its first three years, faced a difficult economy, which included the Panic of 1893. By 1893, not one faculty member from the original group remained.

== First music students of Texas Normal College ==
Six music students were awarded medals at the college's first commencement exercises on June 18, 1991:

- Miss Annie Carson – Proficiency in Vocal Music
- Miss Josie Bell – Improvement in Instrumental Music
- Madge Spalding – Improvement in Vocal Music
- Ed Hann (Edmund Lyne Hann; 1869–1904)

== Family ==
Eliza Jane McKissack was born in New York to James P. (1810–1835) and Elizabeth Aykroyd, née Bettner (d. Mar. 12, 1869). James and Elizabeth were married on July 12, 1824, in New Bern, Craven County, North Carolina. Elizabeth, Eliza's mother, was a music teacher in Nashville.

In practically every North Carolina village where there was an academy there was also a music teacher, an art teacher, and sometimes a dancing teacher. In some of these towns, such as New Bern, Raleigh, Greensboro, and Wilmington, there were music teachers independent of academy patronage. In 1823 James Aykroyd, then of New Bern, "respectfully informed the citizens of Hillsboro and its vicinity that he intended giving lessons in music there during the summer months." His terms were "for the Piano, twelve dollars a quarter, for lessons every other week; and three dollars for vocal music, two lessons every other week."

On August 10, 1854, in Pulaski, Tennessee, Eliza married Alexander Cogle McKissack (b. 30 April 1831 Roxboro, NC; d. 26 Sept 1898, Memphis, TN). Alexander was an 1852 alumnus of Yale College. He died near Memphis at the home of his sister (during a visit), Jessie McKissack Peters of Van Dorn and Spring Hill repute. Alexander McKissack, a native of Pulaski, Tennessee, moved to Holly Springs, Mississippi, in 1856 with his wife, Eliza. Except for his tenure in the Confederate Army during the Civil War, he resided on his plantation, 4 miles north of Holly Springs, until his death.

Alexander and Eliza had only one child, a daughter, who died early.

Eliza Jane McKissack died January 15, 1900, Nashville, Tennessee. The funeral service was held at Christ Church and the burial was at Mount Olivet Cemetery, Nashville, Tennessee.
