= Paula Norwood =

American biostatistician

Paula King Norwood is a retired American biostatistician who worked in the pharmaceutical industry on statistical aspects of drug development and clinical trials. She is a Fellow of the American Statistical Association, and a former chair of the Biopharmaceutical Section of the American Statistical Association.

== Education and career ==
Norwood attended Clarksville High School in Clarksville, Arkansas, and graduated in 1968 from Hendrix College in Conway, Arkansas with a major in mathematics. She has a master's degree in biostatistics from the University of Arkansas for Medical Sciences, and completed her Ph.D. in 1974 at Virginia Tech; her dissertation, Statistical Analysis of Association between Disease and Genotype, was supervised by Klaus Hinkelmann.

Norwood founded the statistics department of Ortho Pharmaceutical, and became Vice President of Global Biostatistics and Data Processing for Johnson & Johnson. She served as chair of the Biopharmaceutical Section of the American Statistical Association in 1986.

== Recognition ==
Norwood was elected as a Fellow of the American Statistical Association in 1994.
