= Barkley Thompson =

American priest in the Episcopal Church

The Reverend Barkley S. Thompson
- Rector of Saint Mark's Episcopal Church - Little Rock, Arkansas
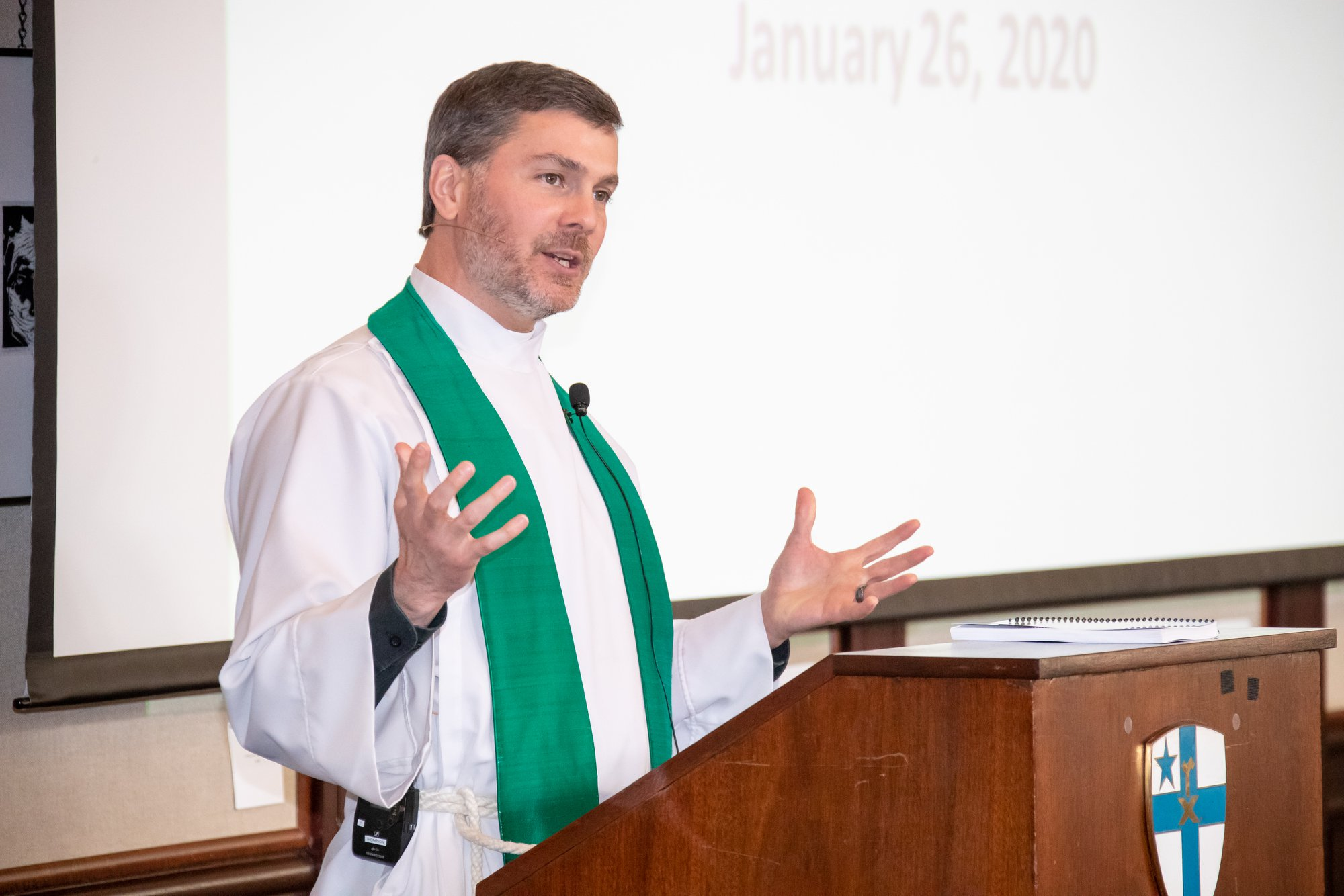
- Barkley Thompson at Christ Church Cathedral, Houston, Texas, in 2020
- In office: 2022–present
- Other posts: Rector of the Church of the Holy Apostles (Collierville, TN), 2003-2007; Rector of St. John's Episcopal Church (Roanoke, VA), 2007-2013; Dean of Christ Church Cathedral (Houston, TX), 2013 - 2022

Personal details
- Born: Barkley Stuart Thompson; 1972 (age 53–54) Paragould, Arkansas
- Denomination: Episcopal Church (USA)
- Residence: Little Rock, Arkansas
- Education: Hendrix College; University of Chicago Divinity School; Episcopal Seminary of the Southwest

Barkley Stuart Thompson (born 1972) is a priest in the Episcopal Church who currently serves as the seventh Rector of Saint Mark's Episcopal Church in Little Rock, Arkansas. Saint Mark's is in the Episcopal Diocese of Arkansas. Before Saint Mark's, he served as the eighth Dean of Christ Church Cathedral in Houston, Texas. Christ Church Cathedral is the cathedral church for the Episcopal Diocese of Texas.

== Early life and education ==
Thompson was born and raised in Paragould, Arkansas. He is the younger brother of Robert F. Thompson, a former majority leader of the Arkansas state senate. Thompson was raised a Methodist, with his early formation in the United Methodist Church contributing to his vocation to pastoral ministry. While in college, Thompson was encouraged to visit a local Episcopal parish church by one of his college professors. About his experience of walking into the church, Thompson has said, "The moment I crossed the threshold from narthex to nave, I had a deep sense that I had come home". He joined the Episcopal Church shortly thereafter, which he has described as combining "the Methodist theology of hospitality and grace" with "Catholic sacramental and liturgical worship".

Thompson graduated with a BA, magna cum laude, from Hendrix College in Conway, Arkansas in 1995, where he also received the college's President's Medal and the Robert C. Moore Religion Award. Thompson went on to earn an MA degree from the University of Chicago Divinity School in 1998. His oral defense paper was entitled, "Toward a Christology of Purpose: The Early Royce and the Incarnation." Thompson later earned the Master of Divinity degree from the Episcopal Theological Seminary of the Southwest in Austin, Texas. From 2012 to 2021, Thompson served on the Seminary of the Southwest's board of trustees.

== Career ==
Following his seminary education, Thompson was ordained first a deacon and then a priest by Bishop Don E. Johnson in the Diocese of West Tennessee of the Episcopal Church. In 2003, he was assigned to his first pastoral appointment as vicar (and later rector) of the Church of the Holy Apostles in Collierville, Tennessee. The congregation numbered only about 40 communicants when he arrived. Under his leadership the parish reorganized and expanded, growing from 40 parishioners to over 400 in just four years.

In 2007, Thompson became the rector at St. John's Episcopal Church in the heart of Roanoke, Virginia. While there, he led the parish in pursuing “innovative-yet-still-traditional forms of worship, new programs for Christian formation, outreach initiatives and enhanced Christian community”. His ministry at St. John's was marked by congregational growth, development of new programming, and the establishment of a parish endowment. In 2009, Thompson also led the parish in a restoration of its historic 117-year-old church.

Thompson was called in 2013 to be the eighth dean and twenty-second rector of Christ Church Cathedral in Houston, Texas. In that capacity, he chaired the board of The Beacon, which is Houston's largest social service day center for the homeless. In 2022, he was called to serve as the seventh Rector of Saint Mark's Episcopal Church in Little Rock, Arkansas. Thompson also serves on the North American Committee for St. George's College in Jerusalem, the Anglican Center in the Holy Land and on the board of St. Francis House, the Episcopal social service center in Little Rock.

== Views ==
=== Theology ===
Thompson's theological approach emphasizes communicating the Christian gospel inductively and narratively through storytelling. This approach is visible both in his preaching and in his published work. Thompson's technique combines the presentation of biblical stories or doctrines with stories of common life to illuminate key themes of the gospel in a way intended to be accessible to Christian audiences. It is a way of communicating theology practically that has been described as “[combining] stories from Scripture and stories from everyday life”. Thompson's approach is developed most fully in Elements of Grace, where he couches his characteristically narrative style in meditations that are organized thematically into the "elemental" categories of Earth, Water, Spirit, Light, Darkness, Discipleship, and Word.

In 2018, Thompson's second book, In the Midst of the City: The Gospel and God's Politics was published by Bright Sky Publishing. The book focuses on the intersection of the Gospel and civic life. In it, Thompson says, "The politics of God is commentary and action that proclaim the advent of God's kingdom in the world...It is central to the role of the Church to be the Body of Christ: to be Christ's voice, hands, and feet; to enact the commentary and action that proclaim the advent of God's kingdom in the world. Without politics, there is no church." The book tackles such topics as the embrace of the LGBTQ+ community, anti-Semitism, gun regulation, and Civil War monuments. NPR personality Diane Rehm described the book as helping "interpret both the divisions and connections we experience as we move through this complex religious, secular, and political world."

In addition, Thompson has published academic essays focusing on figures as diverse as the 19th-century philosopher Josiah Royce and the contemporary agrarian writer Wendell Berry. Thompson has also published a historical essay on the murder of his great, great, great-grandfather, potentially by his great, great, great, great-grandfather, Texas hero Colonel John Henry Moore (Texas settler).

=== Ecclesiastical politics ===
The early years of Thompson's career coincided with a tumultuous time in the Episcopal Church, as tensions around human sexuality led to internal fractures in the denomination that spilled over into the Episcopal Church's relationships with other churches of the Anglican Communion. In response to the trend of individual parishes and dioceses separating themselves from the Episcopal Church, Thompson appealed the historic principle of conciliarism to advocate for a General Council of Anglicanism as the proper arena in which to adjudicate ecclesiastical disputes. For Anglicans, according to Thompson, such a council should be in the form of a Lambeth Conference that would have juridical power.

Thompson has also disputed the practice of Anglican bishops foreign to the United States asserting episcopal supervision over Anglican/Episcopal bodies within US geographical boundaries. He has advocated that the fundamentally provincial character of Anglican polity ought to dictate that the various churches of the Anglican Communion respect one another's autonomy and independence. This attitude, in Thompson's view, would be in conformity with the spirit of the Act in Restraint of Appeals, one of the foundational acts of Parliament of the English Reformation. Thompson has referred to the ideals contained in the Act in Restraint of Appeals the “First Principle of Anglicanism”.
