= Edwin F. Thorne =

American actor

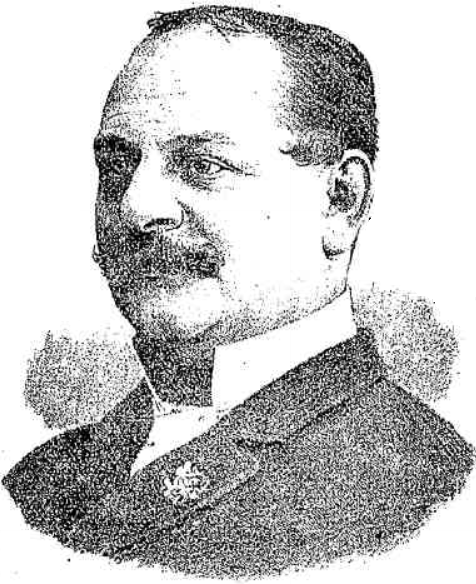
Edwin F. Thorne

Edwin Frederick Thorne (1845 or 1849 – May 4, 1897) was a 19th-century American stage actor.

Thorne was born in New York City in 1845 or 1849 into a prominent acting family of the time. He was the son of Charles R. Thorne, an actor and theatre manager, and Ana Maria Mestayer (Ann Maria Thorne) (also from an acting family), a well known actor and singer. His siblings, Charles R. Thorne Jr., William Thorne, and Emily Thorne, were all actors. He first appeared on the stage in Leavenworth, Kansas.

Another biography has his first appearance at the old Winter Garden Theatre, New York, under Jackson's management in 1859, after which he moved to California, where he played most of the available juvenile roles. He returned to New York in 1865, then to Toronto, Canada, where he played the leading man in several successful productions. He visited Australia on several occasions, to good houses and excellent reviews, most recently in 1889 for Henry Edwards. He was especially known for Shakespeare and quality romantic dramas.

Thorne's popular roles included playing in The Black Flag, a melodrama by Henry Pettitt. He also wrote a play called The Crimes of Paris. Thorne wrote and starred in the comedy play Billiards, possibly the only stage production about cue sports.

Thorne died in New York City on May 4, 1897, after a long illness. Actor Louis Aldrich spoke at his funeral.
