= Rosalie Pelby =

American actress (1793–1857)

Rosalie French Pelby (1793–1857) was an American chorus singer, actress and wax figure sculptor. Pelby was born in Kinderhook, New York. Her wax sculptures were often displayed in Boston, Massachusetts. Pelby's first chorus singing appearance occurred in 1813 at the Federal Street Theatre in Boston. Her career advanced to acting shortly thereafter, in which she sometimes played the lead role. Pelby moved to California and began works in wax sculpting, a field she gained significant acclaim in.
