= Caroline Chapman =

American actress

Caroline Chapman (c. 1818, London – 8 May 1876, San Francisco) was an early-American actress (early-to-mid-19th century), who spent a large part of her adult life acting in the theatres of San Francisco.
