= Cornelia Frances Jefferson =

American actress

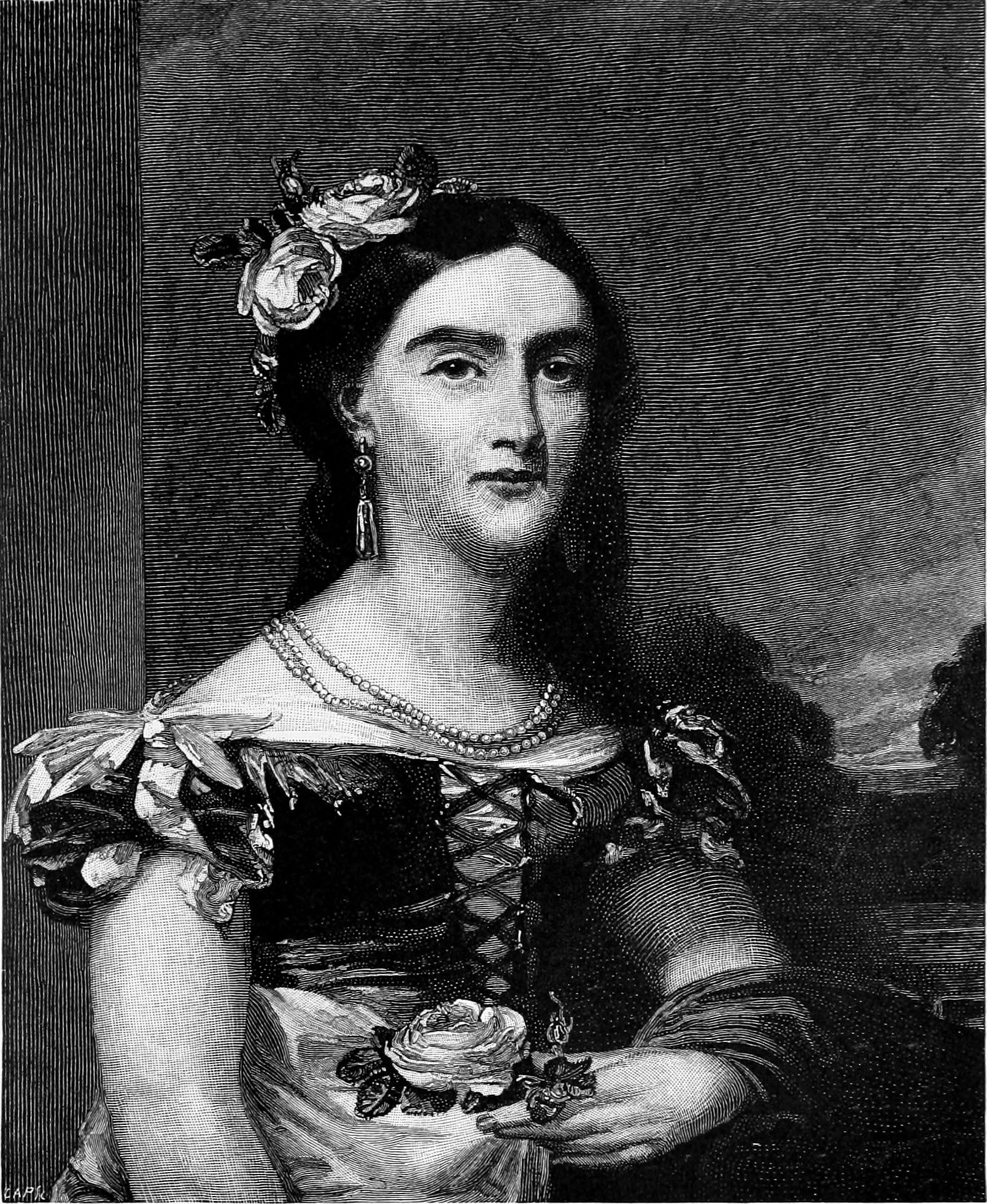
Cornelia Jefferson

Cornelia Frances Jefferson (née Cornelia Frances Thomas; 1 October 1796 in New York – 24 October 1848 in Philadelphia) was an early-American singer and prolific comic actress. She was known widely in her younger years as Mrs. Burke, which was the surname from her first marriage to Thomas Burke.

== Life ==
Cornelia’s mother died when she was very young. Her father, who had been raised in affluence, lost everything and was very poor. He finally found employment in the service of Alexander Placide, in the Charleston Theatre in Charleston, South Carolina.

=== Career ===
Cornelia was trained in the Charleston Theatre in acting and singing. She was engaged at the Charleston Theatre as an actress and a singer.

According to Ireland:

"she possessed a fair share of ability as a comic actress, with a pleasing face and person, and an exquisite voice which, in power, sweetness and purity, was unapproached by anybody."

=== Marriages ===
In 1816, she married Thomas Burke (1794–1825), an Irish comedian. She and Thomas had one son, Charles Saint Thomas Burke (1822–1854), deriving the name of "Saint" from his godfather. He was known in his early days as "Master Burke." Then, on July 27, 1826, in Philadelphia, she married Joseph Jefferson II (1804–1842). She and Joseph had four children. Two died at a very early age, the other two were Joseph Jefferson (1829–1905), who become a noted actor, and Cornelia (1835–1899).
