= Andrew Heiskell Award =

Andrew Heiskell Award was created by Institute of International Education in 2001. The award was named after the name of Andrew Heiskell, a former chairman of Time Inc. and a member of the executive committee of IIE's board of trustees. The aim of this award is to promote and honor the outstanding initiative which is being conducted in international higher education by universities and colleges under IIE network.

== Categories ==
The award is given in following categories:

- Internationalizing the Campus
- Study Abroad
- International Exchange Partnerships
