= Mistress of English Literature =

Mistress of English Literature (M.E.L.) was a master’s degree in English, typically conferred at American women’s colleges during the 19th and early 20th centuries. The degree did not require proficiency in ancient, modern, or foreign languages. The acronym also stood for Master of English Literature. The degree was similar to a Lit.M. or M.Lit. degree. At the time, the terms “Mistress” and “Master” were used interchangeably, with “Mistress” referring specifically to female degree holders. In the era of this degree, both forms were interchangeable depending on the gender of the degree holder.

Variations on the degree, in name and course studies, included Mistress of Polite Literature (M.P.L.)
