= George E. Blake =

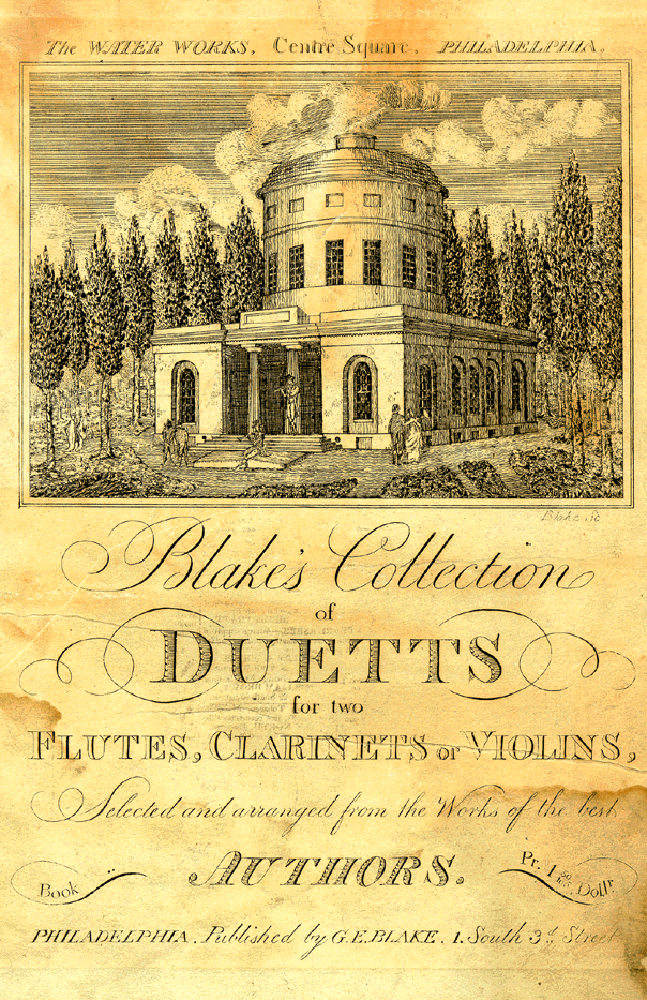
The title page of Blake's Collection of Duetts for Two Flutes, Clarinets, or Violins published by Blake in Philadelphia circa 1807. The engraving features one of Benjamin Latrobe's waterworks buildings in Philadelphia's Center Square.

George E. Blake (17 August 1774 in England – 23 February 1871 in Philadelphia) was an American music engraver and publisher. He was born in Yorkshire, England and, according to his obituary in the Philadelphia Evening Telegraph, emigrated to the United States when he was sixteen. Other sources disagree on the exact year he arrived in America. What is clear though is that by 1793, he began teaching the flute and the clarinet in Philadelphia, operating out of a room above the shop of music publisher John Aitken on South Third Street. During this period, the city was being ravaged by an outbreak of yellow fever. Unlike many others, Blake chose to stay instead of fleeing the city. He remained in Philadelphia for the rest of his long life.

== Blake's career ==
In 1802, Blake acquired the rights to piano maker John Isaac Hawkins' factory. By the next year, he had published his first piece of music, and by 1810, he was advertising his services by claiming that he had the largest assortment of music in the country. At the height of his career, from about 1810 to 1830, he was considered one of the most prolific music publishers in the United States. He was one of the first to publish full scores of American musical theater, including the popular 1810 musical by John Bray and J.N. Barker, The Indian Princess (OCLC 9498204). One of his greatest early achievements was a complete edition of Thomas Moore's Irish Melodies (OCLC 25580733), which Blake first published in 1808 and continued printing until 1825. During the 1820s and 1830s, he undertook what was then the most ambitious music-publishing project in the United States: the complete vocal works of George Frideric Handel in piano-vocal score over fifteen folio volumes (OCLC 25904395). In around 1830, he published the first American edition of Handel's Messiah (OCLC 12561293). His publications throughout his career were diverse: he printed songs of the Philadelphia theater (based on London theater music), opera librettos, original American compositions, political songs, excerpts from Italian opera, and minstrel music. By the 1850s, Blake stopped publishing music, although he continued selling his earlier publications out of his small store at 13 South Fifth Street, which adjoined 23 South Fifth, the residence of his friend and artist Thomas Sully.

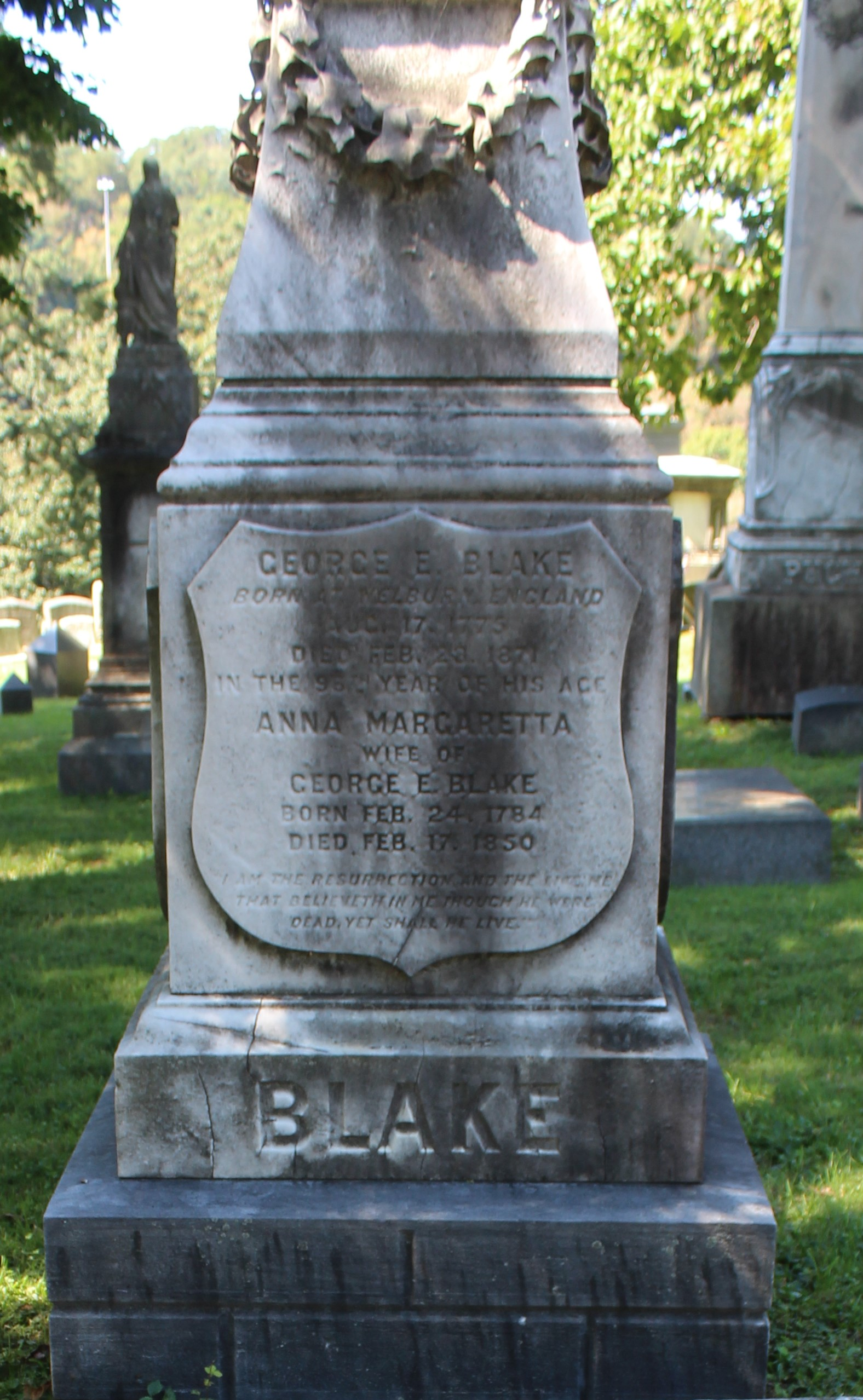
George E. Blake tombstone in Laurel Hill Cemetery

At his death, in his 95th year, Blake was hailed as the oldest publisher in the United States, save and except Lee & Walker, a Philadelphia-based music publisher that had been in existence since 1773. George W. Lee (d. 1875) and Julius Walker (d. 1857) founded their firm in 1848 by acquiring the publishing firm of George Willig (1764–1851), for whom they both once worked. In 1794, George Willig had taken over the firm of Möller & Capron — John Christopher Möller & Henri Capron — which was founded in 1773 as the first music publisher in the United States.
