= National Register of Historic Places listings in Ballard County, Kentucky =

Location of Ballard County in Kentucky

This is a list of the National Register of Historic Places listings in Ballard County, Kentucky, United States.

It is intended to be a complete list of the properties on the National Register of Historic Places in Ballard County, Kentucky, United States. The locations of National Register properties for which the latitude and longitude coordinates are included below, may be seen in a map.

There are 6 properties listed on the National Register in the county.

This National Park Service list is complete through NPS recent listings posted December 12, 2025.

== Current listings ==
	Name on the Register	Image	Date listed	Location	City or town	Description
1	Ballard County Courthouse	Ballard County Courthouse	February 27, 1980 (#80001480)	4th and Court Sts. 36°57′55″N 89°05′19″W	Wickliffe	
2	Barlow House	Barlow House	November 21, 1991 (#91001663)	Junction of Broadway and S. 5th St. 37°03′05″N 89°02′44″W	Barlow	
3	Dr. David Polk Juett Farmstead	Dr. David Polk Juett Farmstead	August 14, 1998 (#98000936)	Blandville-Hinkleville Rd. 36°57′23″N 88°57′19″W	Blandville	
4	Andrew Lovelace Jr. House	Andrew Lovelace Jr. House	January 3, 1978 (#78001296)	West of Lovelaceville off U.S. Route 62; 36°57′59″N 88°50′06″W	Lovelaceville	
5	Trimble House	Trimble House	January 4, 2007 (#06001203)	725 N. 4th St. 36°58′16″N 89°05′19″W	Wickliffe	
6	Wickliffe Site 15 BA 4	Wickliffe Site 15 BA 4	December 8, 1984 (#84000789)	U.S. Routes 51/62 at Wickliffe Mounds State Historic Site; 36°58′16″N 89°05′34″W	Wickliffe	

== See also ==
- List of National Historic Landmarks in Kentucky
- National Register of Historic Places listings in Kentucky
