= Paducah metropolitan area =

Metropolitan Area in Western Kentucky

Coordinates: 37°00′N 88°35′W

Paducah Metropolitan Area
- Metropolitan Statistical Area
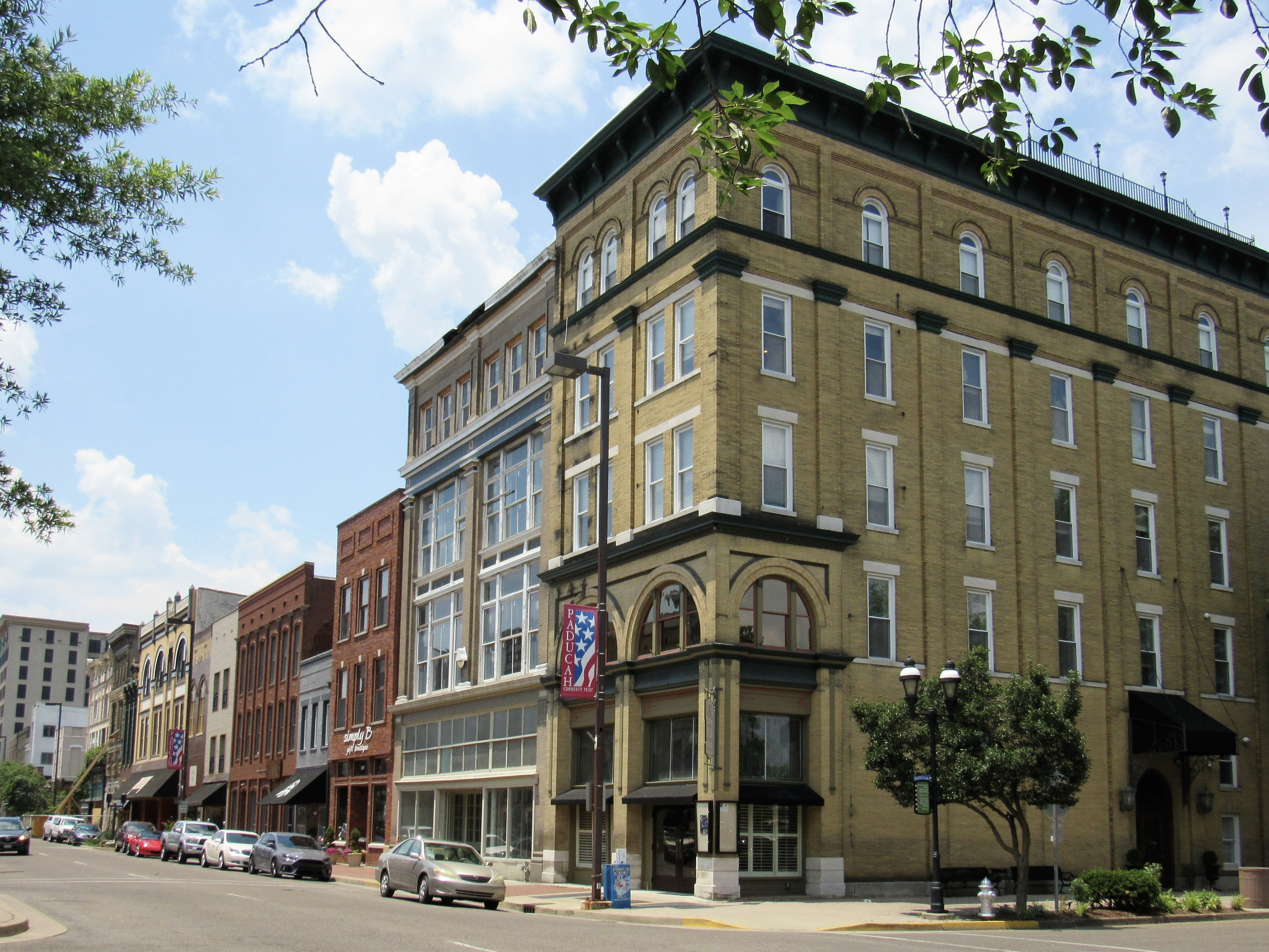
- Broadway, Paducah Downtown Commercial District
Map of Paducah–Mayfield, KY–IL CSA
Paducah, KY–IL MSA
Mayfield, KY µSA
City of Paducah
- Country: United States
- State: Kentucky; Illinois
- Principal cities: Paducah, KY; Mayfield, KY
- Time zone: UTC−6 (CST)
  - Summer (DST): UTC−5 (CDT)

The Paducah, KY–IL Metropolitan Statistical Area, as defined by the United States Census Bureau, is an area consisting of five counties – three in the Jackson Purchase region of Kentucky, a fourth Kentucky county bordering the Purchase, and one in Southern Illinois – anchored by the city of Paducah, Kentucky. The Paducah KY-IL Micropolitan Statistical Area was upgraded to Metropolitan Statistical Area (MSA) status on July 21, 2023, by the Office of Management and Budget. (OMB Bulletin No. 23-01). Carlisle County, Kentucky, was added to the area following the 2020 Census of the Population. The total MSA population from the 2020 United States census was 103,486.

As of the 2000 census, the μSA had a population of 98,765 (though a July 1, 2009 estimate placed the population at 98,609).

== Counties ==
- Ballard County, Kentucky
- Carlisle County, Kentucky
- Graves County, Kentucky
- Livingston County, Kentucky
- McCracken County, Kentucky
- Massac County, Illinois

== Communities ==
=== Places with 10,000 to 50,000 inhabitants ===
- Paducah, Kentucky (Principal City)
- Mayfield, Kentucky

=== Places with 1,000 to 10,000 inhabitants ===
- Calvert City, Kentucky (unconfirmed, supposed.)
- Farley, Kentucky (census-designated place)
- Hendron, Kentucky (census-designated place)
- Ledbetter, Kentucky (census-designated place)
- Massac, Kentucky (census-designated place)
- Metropolis, Illinois
- Reidland, Kentucky (census-designated place)

=== Places with 500 to 1,000 inhabitants ===
- Brookport, Illinois
- Bardwell, Kentucky
- Barlow, Kentucky
- Kevil, Kentucky
- La Center, Kentucky
- Salem, Kentucky
- Wickliffe, Kentucky

=== Places with less than 500 inhabitants ===
- Arlington, Kentucky
- Blandville, Kentucky
- Carrsville, Kentucky
- Grand Rivers, Kentucky
- Joppa, Illinois
- Lone Oak, Kentucky (census-designated place)
- Smithland, Kentucky
- Symsonia, Kentucky

=== Unincorporated communities and census-designated places ===
- Bandana, Kentucky
- Bayou, Kentucky
- Burkley, Kentucky
- Bargerville, Illinois
- Birdsville, Kentucky
- Burna, Kentucky
- Cunningham, Kentucky
- Gage, Kentucky
- Hampton, Kentucky
- Heath, Kentucky
- Hillerman, Illinois
- Iuka, Kentucky
- Joy, Kentucky
- Kirbyton, Kentucky
- Lake City, Kentucky
- Lola, Kentucky
- Lovelaceville, Kentucky (census-designated place)
- Milburn, Kentucky
- Monkey's Eyebrow, Kentucky
- New Liberty, Illinois
- New York, Kentucky
- Newbern, Kentucky
- Oscar, Kentucky
- Pinckneyville, Kentucky
- Round Knob, Illinois
- Shady Grove, Illinois
- Slater, Kentucky
- Tiline, Kentucky
- Unionville, Illinois
- West Paducah, Kentucky

== Demographics ==
As of the census of 2000, there were 98,765 people, 41,398 households, and 28,070 families residing within the μSA. The racial makeup of the μSA was 78.31% White, 19.53% African American, 0.22% Native American, 0.40% Asian, 0.04% Pacific Islander, 0.35% from other races, and 1.14% from two or more races. Hispanics or Latinos of any race were 0.95% of the population.

The median income for a household in the μSA was $32,317, and the median income for a family was $40,613. Males had a median income of $33,797 versus $20,906 for females. The per capita income for the μSA was $17,994.

== Combined Statistical Area ==
The Paducah–Mayfield, KY-IL Combined Statistical Area is made up of four counties in the Jackson Purchase region of Kentucky, a fifth Kentucky county that borders the Purchase, and one county in southern Illinois. The statistical area includes the Paducah, KY-IL Metropolitan Statistical Area and the Mayfield, KY micropolitan area. As of the 2020 Census, the CSA had a population of 140,135. The 2000 total was 135,793 (though a July 1, 2009 estimate placed the population at 136,328).

- Metropolitan Statistical Area (MSAs)
  - Paducah (Ballard County, Kentucky; Carlisle County, Kentucky; Livingston County, Kentucky; McCracken County, Kentucky; and Massac County, Illinois)
- Micropolitan Statistical Areas (μSAs)
  - Mayfield (Graves County, Kentucky)

== See also ==
- Kentucky statistical areas
- Illinois statistical areas
