= Ballard County Courthouse =

- U.S. National Register of Historic Places
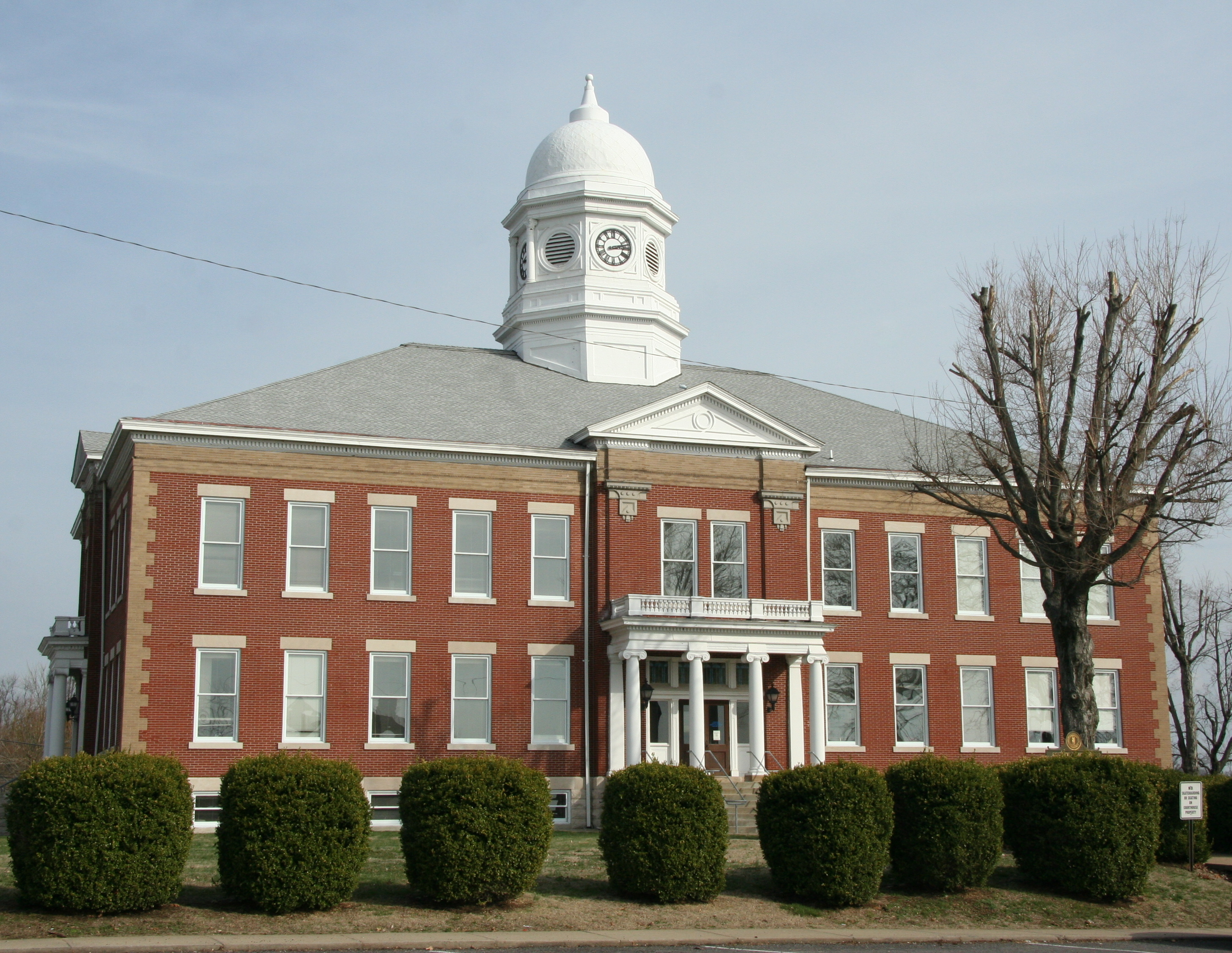

- Location within Kentucky Location within the United States
- Location: Fourth and Court Streets, Wickliffe, Kentucky
- Coordinates: 36°57′54″N 89°5′20″W
- Area: 0.5 acres (0.20 ha)
- Built: 1900–1905
- Architect: Legg, Jerome B.
- NRHP reference No.: 80001480
- Added to NRHP: February 27, 1980

The Ballard County Courthouse, located at Fourth and Court Streets in Wickliffe, is the center of government of Ballard County, Kentucky. The courthouse was constructed from 1900 to 1905. It was the first permanent courthouse in Wickliffe and replaced a courthouse in Blandville that burned down in 1880. Architect Jerome B. Legg designed the courthouse; his design features an octagonal cupola atop the building, Ionic porticos over three of the entrances, and a central pavilion on each side.

The courthouse was added to the National Register of Historic Places on February 27, 1980.
