= Hinkleville =

Hinkleville may refer to:

- Hinkleville, Kentucky, an unincorporated community in Ballard County
- Hinkleville, West Virginia, an unincorporated community in Upshur County
