= Ballard High School =

Several schools share the name Ballard High School or a similar name including:

- Ballard High School in Macon, Georgia that was eventually merged to form Ballard-Hudson High School
- Ballard High School (Huxley, Iowa), a school in the Ballard Community School District in Huxley, Iowa
- Ballard Memorial High School, Barlow, Kentucky
- Ballard High School (Louisville, Kentucky)
- Ballard High School (Butler, Missouri), Butler, Missouri
- Ballard High School (Seattle), in Washington state
