= Ingleside, Kentucky =

Unincorporated community in Kentucky, United States

Ingleside
- Unincorporated community
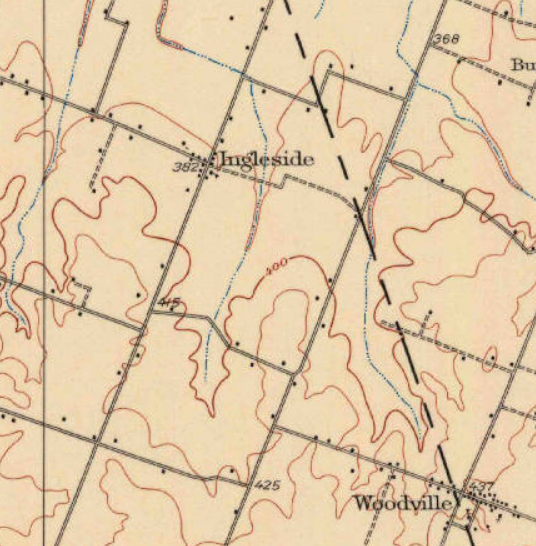
- Ingelside and its vicinity on the 1928 1:62500 LaCenter quad

- Location within the state of Kentucky Ingleside (the United States)
- Coordinates: 37°7′24″N 88°54′5″W
- Country: United States
- State: Kentucky
- County: Ballard
- Elevation: 381 ft (116 m)
- Time zone: UTC-6 (Central (CST))
  - Summer (DST): UTC-5 (CST)
- GNIS feature ID: 494987

Ingleside is an unincorporated community located in Ballard County, Kentucky, United States.

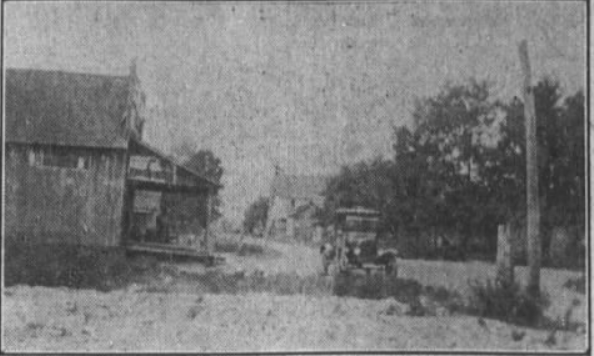
1923 photo of Ingleside

The Ingleside post office opened in 1893 and was closed in 1909, after which the mail went through Kevil. The origin of the name Ingleside is unknown.

Ingleside formed about 30 years before 1923 when Joe Wray, W. L. Reasor, W. H. Elrod, and J. M. Burnley settled there. Stores operated by Burnley and two Wray brothers were soon opened, and the latter were named postmasters in 1894. The area produced peas and wheat, and was considered to be one of the better regions in Ballard County for producing grain. The Modern Woodmen of America and Odd Fellows both had lodges there in 1923. In that same year, the community's two-room schoolhouse had about 75 students. A 1923 newspaper article noted that multiple Christian denominations held an interdenominational Sunday School service at Ingleside.
