= Illinois statistical areas =

Coordinates: 40.0417°N 89.1965°W

The U.S. State of Illinois currently has 47 statistical areas that have been delineated by the Office of Management and Budget (OMB). On July 21, 2023, the OMB delineated 14 combined statistical areas, 12 metropolitan statistical areas, and 21 micropolitan statistical areas in Illinois. As of 2025, the largest of these is the Chicago–Naperville, IL-IN-WI CSA, comprising the area around Illinois' largest city, Chicago.

== Statistical areas ==
The Office of Management and Budget (OMB) has designated more than 1,000 statistical areas for the United States and Puerto Rico. These statistical areas are important geographic delineations of population clusters used by the OMB, the United States Census Bureau, planning organizations, and federal, state, and local government entities.

The OMB defines a core-based statistical area (CBSA) as the county or counties (or county-equivalents) surrounding at least one densely-settled core of at least 10,000 population, "plus adjacent counties having a high degree of social and economic integration with the core as measured through commuting ties with the counties containing the core". The OMB further divides a CBSA based on population into a metropolitan statistical area (MSA) for those with at least 50,000 people or a micropolitan statistical area (μSA) for those with 10,000 to 49,999 people.

The OMB defines a combined statistical area (CSA) as two or more adjacent CBSAs where the employment interchange rate (percent commuting from A to B plus percent commuting from B to A) is at least 15%. A primary statistical area (PSA) includes all CSAs and any CBSA that is not a constituent of a combined statistical area.

The 47 United States statistical areas and 102 counties of the State of Illinois (Note: An out-of-state area and its population are displayed in green. An area that extends into more than one state is displayed in purple. A purple population number over a black population number show the total population versus the in-state population. The state's abbreviation is also shown next to the in-state total.)
Combined statistical area	2025 population (est.)	Core-based statistical area	2025 population (est.)	County	2025 population (est.)	Metropolitan division	2025 population (est.)
Chicago–Naperville, IL-IN-WI CSA	9,965,292; 8,956,807 (IL)	Chicago–Naperville–Elgin, IL-IN MSA	9,434,123; 8,705,380 (IL)	Cook County, Illinois	5,194,625	Chicago–Naperville–Schaumburg, IL MD	7,212,979
Chicago–Naperville, IL-IN-WI CSA	9,965,292; 8,956,807 (IL)	Chicago–Naperville–Elgin, IL-IN MSA	9,434,123; 8,705,380 (IL)	DuPage County, Illinois	934,298	Chicago–Naperville–Schaumburg, IL MD	7,212,979
Chicago–Naperville, IL-IN-WI CSA	9,965,292; 8,956,807 (IL)	Chicago–Naperville–Elgin, IL-IN MSA	9,434,123; 8,705,380 (IL)	Will County, Illinois	712,253	Chicago–Naperville–Schaumburg, IL MD	7,212,979
Chicago–Naperville, IL-IN-WI CSA	9,965,292; 8,956,807 (IL)	Chicago–Naperville–Elgin, IL-IN MSA	9,434,123; 8,705,380 (IL)	McHenry County, Illinois	317,751	Chicago–Naperville–Schaumburg, IL MD	7,212,979
Chicago–Naperville, IL-IN-WI CSA	9,965,292; 8,956,807 (IL)	Chicago–Naperville–Elgin, IL-IN MSA	9,434,123; 8,705,380 (IL)	Grundy County, Illinois	54,052	Chicago–Naperville–Schaumburg, IL MD	7,212,979
Chicago–Naperville, IL-IN-WI CSA	9,965,292; 8,956,807 (IL)	Chicago–Naperville–Elgin, IL-IN MSA	9,434,123; 8,705,380 (IL)	Kane County, Illinois	525,757	Elgin, IL MD	773,062
Chicago–Naperville, IL-IN-WI CSA	9,965,292; 8,956,807 (IL)	Chicago–Naperville–Elgin, IL-IN MSA	9,434,123; 8,705,380 (IL)	Kendall County, Illinois	145,470	Elgin, IL MD	773,062
Chicago–Naperville, IL-IN-WI CSA	9,965,292; 8,956,807 (IL)	Chicago–Naperville–Elgin, IL-IN MSA	9,434,123; 8,705,380 (IL)	DeKalb County, Illinois	101,835	Elgin, IL MD	773,062
Chicago–Naperville, IL-IN-WI CSA	9,965,292; 8,956,807 (IL)	Chicago–Naperville–Elgin, IL-IN MSA	9,434,123; 8,705,380 (IL)	Lake County, Indiana	504,612	Lake County–Porter County–Jasper County, IN MD	728,743
Chicago–Naperville, IL-IN-WI CSA	9,965,292; 8,956,807 (IL)	Chicago–Naperville–Elgin, IL-IN MSA	9,434,123; 8,705,380 (IL)	Porter County, Indiana	176,049	Lake County–Porter County–Jasper County, IN MD	728,743
Chicago–Naperville, IL-IN-WI CSA	9,965,292; 8,956,807 (IL)	Chicago–Naperville–Elgin, IL-IN MSA	9,434,123; 8,705,380 (IL)	Jasper County, Indiana	33,894	Lake County–Porter County–Jasper County, IN MD	728,743
Chicago–Naperville, IL-IN-WI CSA	9,965,292; 8,956,807 (IL)	Chicago–Naperville–Elgin, IL-IN MSA	9,434,123; 8,705,380 (IL)	Newton County, Indiana	14,188	Lake County–Porter County–Jasper County, IN MD	728,743
Chicago–Naperville, IL-IN-WI CSA	9,965,292; 8,956,807 (IL)	Chicago–Naperville–Elgin, IL-IN MSA	9,434,123; 8,705,380 (IL)	Lake County, Illinois	719,339	Lake County, IL MD	719,339
Chicago–Naperville, IL-IN-WI CSA	9,965,292; 8,956,807 (IL)	Kenosha, WI MSA	168,448	Kenosha County, Wisconsin	168,448	none	
Chicago–Naperville, IL-IN-WI CSA	9,965,292; 8,956,807 (IL)	Ottawa, IL μSA	145,902	LaSalle County, Illinois	107,773	none	
Chicago–Naperville, IL-IN-WI CSA	9,965,292; 8,956,807 (IL)	Ottawa, IL μSA	145,902	Bureau County, Illinois	32,510	none	
Chicago–Naperville, IL-IN-WI CSA	9,965,292; 8,956,807 (IL)	Ottawa, IL μSA	145,902	Putnam County, Illinois	5,619	none	
Chicago–Naperville, IL-IN-WI CSA	9,965,292; 8,956,807 (IL)	Michigan City–La Porte, IN MSA	111,294	LaPorte County, Indiana	111,294	none	
Chicago–Naperville, IL-IN-WI CSA	9,965,292; 8,956,807 (IL)	Kankakee, IL MSA	105,525	Kankakee County, Illinois	105,525	none	
St. Louis–St. Charles–Farmington, MO-IL CSA	2,918,612 (Note: Per the most recent OMB bulletin, the portion of Sullivan, Missouri within Crawford County, Missouri is included in St. Louis' statistical areas. Population data for this portion of Sullivan is not readily available and is not included in this table.); 708,335 (IL)	St. Louis, MO-IL MSA	2,814,421; 671,953 (IL)	St. Louis County, Missouri	990,911	none	
St. Louis–St. Charles–Farmington, MO-IL CSA	2,918,612; 708,335 (IL)	St. Louis, MO-IL MSA	2,814,421; 671,953 (IL)	St. Charles County, Missouri	426,499	none	
St. Louis–St. Charles–Farmington, MO-IL CSA	2,918,612; 708,335 (IL)	St. Louis, MO-IL MSA	2,814,421; 671,953 (IL)	City of St. Louis, Missouri	278,144	none	
St. Louis–St. Charles–Farmington, MO-IL CSA	2,918,612; 708,335 (IL)	St. Louis, MO-IL MSA	2,814,421; 671,953 (IL)	Madison County, Illinois	263,110	none	
St. Louis–St. Charles–Farmington, MO-IL CSA	2,918,612; 708,335 (IL)	St. Louis, MO-IL MSA	2,814,421; 671,953 (IL)	St. Clair County, Illinois	250,708	none	
St. Louis–St. Charles–Farmington, MO-IL CSA	2,918,612; 708,335 (IL)	St. Louis, MO-IL MSA	2,814,421; 671,953 (IL)	Jefferson County, Missouri	233,132	none	
St. Louis–St. Charles–Farmington, MO-IL CSA	2,918,612; 708,335 (IL)	St. Louis, MO-IL MSA	2,814,421; 671,953 (IL)	Franklin County, Missouri	108,090	none	
St. Louis–St. Charles–Farmington, MO-IL CSA	2,918,612; 708,335 (IL)	St. Louis, MO-IL MSA	2,814,421; 671,953 (IL)	Lincoln County, Missouri	66,676	none	
St. Louis–St. Charles–Farmington, MO-IL CSA	2,918,612; 708,335 (IL)	St. Louis, MO-IL MSA	2,814,421; 671,953 (IL)	Macoupin County, Illinois	43,748	none	
St. Louis–St. Charles–Farmington, MO-IL CSA	2,918,612; 708,335 (IL)	St. Louis, MO-IL MSA	2,814,421; 671,953 (IL)	Warren County, Missouri	39,016	none	
St. Louis–St. Charles–Farmington, MO-IL CSA	2,918,612; 708,335 (IL)	St. Louis, MO-IL MSA	2,814,421; 671,953 (IL)	Clinton County, Illinois	37,128	none	
St. Louis–St. Charles–Farmington, MO-IL CSA	2,918,612; 708,335 (IL)	St. Louis, MO-IL MSA	2,814,421; 671,953 (IL)	Monroe County, Illinois	34,840	none	
St. Louis–St. Charles–Farmington, MO-IL CSA	2,918,612; 708,335 (IL)	St. Louis, MO-IL MSA	2,814,421; 671,953 (IL)	Jersey County, Illinois	21,160	none	
St. Louis–St. Charles–Farmington, MO-IL CSA	2,918,612; 708,335 (IL)	St. Louis, MO-IL MSA	2,814,421; 671,953 (IL)	Bond County, Illinois	16,959	none	
St. Louis–St. Charles–Farmington, MO-IL CSA	2,918,612; 708,335 (IL)	St. Louis, MO-IL MSA	2,814,421; 671,953 (IL)	Calhoun County, Illinois	4,300	none	
St. Louis–St. Charles–Farmington, MO-IL CSA	2,918,612; 708,335 (IL)	Farmington, MO μSA	67,809	Saint Francois County, Missouri	67,809	none	
St. Louis–St. Charles–Farmington, MO-IL CSA	2,918,612; 708,335 (IL)	Centralia, IL μSA	36,382	Marion County, Illinois	36,382	none	
Rockford–Freeport–Rochelle, IL CSA	431,861	Rockford, IL MSA	337,242	Winnebago County, Illinois	283,674	none	
Rockford–Freeport–Rochelle, IL CSA	431,861	Rockford, IL MSA	337,242	Boone County, Illinois	53,568	none	
Rockford–Freeport–Rochelle, IL CSA	431,861	Rochelle, IL μSA	51,399	Ogle County, Illinois	51,399	none	
Rockford–Freeport–Rochelle, IL CSA	431,861	Freeport, IL μSA	43,220	Stephenson County, Illinois	43,220	none	
Peoria–Canton, IL CSA	396,406	Peoria, IL MSA	363,505	Peoria County, Illinois	178,553	none	
Peoria–Canton, IL CSA	396,406	Peoria, IL MSA	363,505	Tazewell County, Illinois	130,049	none	
Peoria–Canton, IL CSA	396,406	Peoria, IL MSA	363,505	Woodford County, Illinois	38,111	none	
Peoria–Canton, IL CSA	396,406	Peoria, IL MSA	363,505	Marshall County, Illinois	11,473	none	
Peoria–Canton, IL CSA	396,406	Peoria, IL MSA	363,505	Stark County, Illinois	5,319	none	
Peoria–Canton, IL CSA	396,406	Canton, IL μSA	32,901	Fulton County, Illinois	32,901	none	
Champaign–Urbana–Danville, IL CSA	311,238	Champaign–Urbana, IL MSA	239,979	Champaign County, Illinois	209,972	none	
Champaign–Urbana–Danville, IL CSA	311,238	Champaign–Urbana, IL MSA	239,979	Piatt County, Illinois	16,791	none	
Champaign–Urbana–Danville, IL CSA	311,238	Champaign–Urbana, IL MSA	239,979	Ford County, Illinois	13,216	none	
Champaign–Urbana–Danville, IL CSA	311,238	Danville, IL μSA	71,259	Vermilion County, Illinois	71,259	none	
Springfield–Jacksonville–Lincoln, IL CSA	304,039	Springfield, IL MSA	206,033	Sangamon County, Illinois	194,170	none	
Springfield–Jacksonville–Lincoln, IL CSA	304,039	Springfield, IL MSA	206,033	Menard County, Illinois	11,863	none	
Springfield–Jacksonville–Lincoln, IL CSA	304,039	Jacksonville, IL μSA	37,381	Morgan County, Illinois	32,515	none	
Springfield–Jacksonville–Lincoln, IL CSA	304,039	Jacksonville, IL μSA	37,381	Scott County, Illinois	4,866	none	
Springfield–Jacksonville–Lincoln, IL CSA	304,039	Taylorville, IL μSA	33,443	Christian County, Illinois	33,443	none	
Springfield–Jacksonville–Lincoln, IL CSA	304,039	Lincoln, IL μSA	27,182	Logan County, Illinois	27,182	none	
Bloomington–Pontiac, IL CSA	206,476	Bloomington, IL MSA	171,419	McLean County, Illinois	171,419	none	
Bloomington–Pontiac, IL CSA	206,476	Pontiac, IL μSA	35,057	Livingston County, Illinois	35,057	none	
Davenport–Moline, IA-IL CSA	468,307; 205,193 (IL)	Davenport–Moline–Rock Island, IA-IL MSA	380,452; 205,193 (IL)	Scott County, Iowa	175,259	none	
Davenport–Moline, IA-IL CSA	468,307; 205,193 (IL)	Davenport–Moline–Rock Island, IA-IL MSA	380,452; 205,193 (IL)	Rock Island County, Illinois	141,869	none	
Davenport–Moline, IA-IL CSA	468,307; 205,193 (IL)	Davenport–Moline–Rock Island, IA-IL MSA	380,452; 205,193 (IL)	Henry County, Illinois	48,095	none	
Davenport–Moline, IA-IL CSA	468,307; 205,193 (IL)	Davenport–Moline–Rock Island, IA-IL MSA	380,452; 205,193 (IL)	Mercer County, Illinois	15,229	none	
Davenport–Moline, IA-IL CSA	468,307; 205,193 (IL)	Clinton, IA μSA	46,002	Clinton County, Iowa	46,002	none	
Davenport–Moline, IA-IL CSA	468,307; 205,193 (IL)	Muscatine, IA μSA	41,853	Muscatine County, Iowa	41,853	none	
Carbondale–Marion–Herrin, IL CSA	119,726	Marion–Herrin, IL μSA	67,225	Williamson County, Illinois	67,225	none	
Carbondale–Marion–Herrin, IL CSA	119,726	Carbondale, IL μSA	52,501	Jackson County, Illinois	52,501	none	
none		Decatur, IL MSA	99,300	Macon County, Illinois	99,300	none	
Dixon–Sterling, IL CSA	87,035	Sterling, IL μSA	54,121	Whiteside County, Illinois	54,121	none	
Dixon–Sterling, IL CSA	87,035	Dixon, IL μSA	32,914	Lee County, Illinois	32,914	none	
Quincy–Hannibal, IL-MO CSA	113,115; 64,267 (IL)	Quincy, IL-MO μSA	74,146; 64,267 (IL)	Adams County, Illinois	64,267	none	
Quincy–Hannibal, IL-MO CSA	113,115; 64,267 (IL)	Quincy, IL-MO μSA	74,146; 64,267 (IL)	Lewis County, Missouri	9,879	none	
Quincy–Hannibal, IL-MO CSA	113,115; 64,267 (IL)	Hannibal, MO μSA	38,969	Marion County, Missouri	28,525	none	
Quincy–Hannibal, IL-MO CSA	113,115; 64,267 (IL)	Hannibal, MO μSA	38,969	Ralls County, Missouri	10,444	none	
none		Galesburg, IL μSA	47,767	Knox County, Illinois	47,767	none	
none		Charleston–Mattoon, IL μSA	46,607	Coles County, Illinois	46,607	none	
none		Effingham, IL μSA	44,727	Effingham County, Illinois	34,519	none	
none		Effingham, IL μSA	44,727	Cumberland County, Illinois	10,208	none	
none		Mount Vernon, IL μSA	36,147	Jefferson County, Illinois	36,147	none	
none		Macomb, IL μSA	25,916	McDonough County, Illinois	25,916	none	
Paducah–Mayfield, KY-IL CSA	139,309; 13,502 (IL)	Paducah, KY-IL MSA	102,259; 13,502 (IL)	McCracken County, Kentucky	67,553	none	
Paducah–Mayfield, KY-IL CSA	139,309; 13,502 (IL)	Paducah, KY-IL MSA	102,259; 13,502 (IL)	Massac County, Illinois	13,502	none	
Paducah–Mayfield, KY-IL CSA	139,309; 13,502 (IL)	Paducah, KY-IL MSA	102,259; 13,502 (IL)	Livingston County, Kentucky	8,863	none	
Paducah–Mayfield, KY-IL CSA	139,309; 13,502 (IL)	Paducah, KY-IL MSA	102,259; 13,502 (IL)	Ballard County, Kentucky	7,594	none	
Paducah–Mayfield, KY-IL CSA	139,309; 13,502 (IL)	Paducah, KY-IL MSA	102,259; 13,502 (IL)	Carlisle County, Kentucky	4,747	none	
Paducah–Mayfield, KY-IL CSA	139,309; 13,502 (IL)	Mayfield, KY μSA	37,050	Graves County, Kentucky	37,050	none	
Burlington–Fort Madison, IA-IL CSA	76,367; 5,984 (IL)	Burlington, IA-IL μSA	44,061; 5,984 (IL)	Des Moines County, Iowa	38,077	none	
Burlington–Fort Madison, IA-IL CSA	76,367; 5,984 (IL)	Burlington, IA-IL μSA	44,061; 5,984 (IL)	Henderson County, Illinois	5,984	none	
Burlington–Fort Madison, IA-IL CSA	76,367; 5,984 (IL)	Fort Madison, IA μSA	32,306	Lee County, Iowa	32,306	none	
Cape Girardeau–Sikeston, MO-IL CSA	149,193; 4,570 (IL)	Cape Girardeau, MO-IL MSA	99,215; 4,570 (IL)	Cape Girardeau County, Missouri	83,999	none	
Cape Girardeau–Sikeston, MO-IL CSA	149,193; 4,570 (IL)	Cape Girardeau, MO-IL MSA	99,215; 4,570 (IL)	Bollinger County, Missouri	10,646	none	
Cape Girardeau–Sikeston, MO-IL CSA	149,193; 4,570 (IL)	Cape Girardeau, MO-IL MSA	99,215; 4,570 (IL)	Alexander County, Illinois	4,570	none	
Cape Girardeau–Sikeston, MO-IL CSA	149,193; 4,570 (IL)	Sikeston, MO μSA	49,978	Scott County, Missouri	37,975	none	
Cape Girardeau–Sikeston, MO-IL CSA	149,193; 4,570 (IL)	Sikeston, MO μSA	49,978	Mississippi County, Missouri	12,003	none	
none				Franklin County, Illinois	36,916	none	
none				Randolph County, Illinois	29,921	none	
none				Montgomery County, Illinois	28,076	none	
none				Iroquois County, Illinois	26,150	none	
none				Saline County, Illinois	22,772	none	
none				Jo Daviess County, Illinois	21,594	none	
none				Fayette County, Illinois	20,790	none	
none				Shelby County, Illinois	20,576	none	
none				Perry County, Illinois	20,160	none	
none				Douglas County, Illinois	19,880	none	
none				Crawford County, Illinois	18,648	none	
none				Hancock County, Illinois	16,803	none	
none				Union County, Illinois	16,656	none	
none				Edgar County, Illinois	16,323	none	
none				Warren County, Illinois	16,222	none	
none				Wayne County, Illinois	15,882	none	
none				Carroll County, Illinois	15,419	none	
none				Richland County, Illinois	15,219	none	
none				DeWitt County, Illinois	15,118	none	
none				Clark County, Illinois	15,114	none	
none				Moultrie County, Illinois	14,371	none	
none				Pike County, Illinois	14,231	none	
none				Lawrence County, Illinois	13,790	none	
none				Washington County, Illinois	13,564	none	
none				Johnson County, Illinois	13,363	none	
none				White County, Illinois	13,250	none	
none				Clay County, Illinois	12,793	none	
none				Cass County, Illinois	12,463	none	
none				Mason County, Illinois	12,411	none	
none				Greene County, Illinois	11,313	none	
none				Wabash County, Illinois	10,907	none	
none				Jasper County, Illinois	9,032	none	
none				Hamilton County, Illinois	7,859	none	
none				Schuyler County, Illinois	6,657	none	
none				Brown County, Illinois	6,401	none	
none				Edwards County, Illinois	5,898	none	
none				Pulaski County, Illinois	4,820	none	
none				Gallatin County, Illinois	4,616	none	
none				Pope County, Illinois	3,672	none	
none				Hardin County, Illinois	3,588	none	
State of Illinois					12,719,141	none	

The 32 core-based statistical areas of the State of Illinois (Note: For CBSAs comprising populations from multiple states, they are listed twice to show both their intrastate population within that CBSA as well as the CBSA's total population. Only the intrastate population is ranked.)
2025 rank	Core-based statistical area	Population				
2025 rank	Core-based statistical area	2025 estimate	Change	2020 Census	Change	2010 Census
1	Chicago–Naperville–Elgin, IL-IN MSA (IL)	8,705,380	−0.29%	8,730,688	+1.68%	8,586,609
2	St. Louis, MO-IL MSA (IL)	671,953	−1.58%	682,761	−2.97%	703,664
3	Peoria, IL MSA	363,505	−1.43%	368,782	−2.74%	379,186
4	Rockford, IL MSA	337,242	−0.46%	338,798	−3.04%	349,431
5	Champaign–Urbana, IL MSA	239,979	+1.66%	236,072	+1.80%	231,891
6	Springfield, IL MSA	206,033	−1.25%	208,640	−0.73%	210,170
7	Davenport–Moline–Rock Island, IA-IL MSA (IL)	205,193	−2.13%	209,655	−1.77%	213,442
8	Bloomington, IL MSA	171,419	+0.27%	170,954	+0.81%	169,572
9	Ottawa, IL μSA	145,902	−1.78%	148,539	−4.11%	154,908
10	Kankakee, IL MSA	105,525	−1.84%	107,502	−5.24%	113,449
11	Decatur, IL MSA	99,300	−4.52%	103,998	−6.11%	110,768
12	Danville, IL μSA	71,259	−3.95%	74,188	−9.11%	81,625
13	Marion–Herrin, IL μSA	67,225	+0.11%	67,153	+1.20%	66,357
14	Quincy, IL-MO μSA (IL)	64,267	−2.24%	65,737	−2.04%	67,103
15	Sterling, IL μSA	54,121	−2.82%	55,691	−4.80%	58,498
16	Carbondale, IL μSA	52,501	−0.89%	52,974	−12.03%	60,218
17	Rochelle, IL μSA	51,399	−0.75%	51,788	−3.19%	53,497
18	Galesburg, IL μSA	47,767	−4.40%	49,967	−5.58%	52,919
19	Charleston–Mattoon, IL μSA	46,607	−0.55%	46,863	−13.01%	53,873
20	Effingham, IL μSA	44,727	−0.87%	45,118	−0.38%	45,290
21	Freeport, IL μSA	43,220	−3.16%	44,630	−6.46%	47,711
22	Jacksonville, IL μSA	37,381	−1.28%	37,864	−7.43%	40,902
23	Centralia, IL μSA	36,382	−3.57%	37,729	−4.33%	39,437
24	Mount Vernon, IL μSA	36,147	−2.60%	37,113	−4.41%	38,827
25	Pontiac, IL μSA	35,057	−2.12%	35,815	−8.05%	38,950
26	Taylorville, IL μSA	33,443	−1.73%	34,032	−2.21%	34,800
27	Canton, IL μSA	32,901	−2.11%	33,609	−9.33%	37,069
28	Lincoln, IL μSA	27,182	−2.88%	27,987	−7.65%	30,305
29	Macomb, IL μSA	25,916	−4.85%	27,238	−16.48%	32,612
30	Paducah, KY-IL μSA (IL)	13,502	−4.71%	14,169	−8.17%	15,429
31	Burlington, IA-IL μSA (IL)	5,984	−6.31%	6,387	−12.88%	7,331
32	Cape Girardeau, MO-IL μSA (IL)	4,570	−12.79%	5,240	−36.39%	8,238
	Burlington, IA-IL μSA	44,061	−2.73%	45,297	−4.95%	47,656
	Cape Girardeau, MO-IL μSA	99,215	+1.74%	97,517	+1.29%	96,275
	Chicago–Naperville–Elgin, IL-IN MSA	9,434,123	−0.16%	9,449,351	+1.66%	9,294,679
	Davenport–Moline–Rock Island, IA-IL MSA	380,452	−1.01%	384,324	+1.49%	378,666
	Paducah, KY-IL μSA	102,259	−1.19%	103,486	−0.37%	103,866
	Quincy, IL-MO μSA	74,146	−2.14%	75,769	−2.00%	77,314
	St. Louis, MO-IL MSA	2,814,421	−0.21%	2,820,253	+1.17%	2,787,701

The 14 combined statistical areas of the State of Illinois (Note: For CSAs comprising populations from multiple states, they are listed twice to show both their intrastate population within that CSA as well as the CSA's total population. Only the intrastate population is ranked.)
2025 rank	Combined statistical area	Population				
2025 rank	Combined statistical area	2025 estimate	Change	2020 Census	Change	2010 Census
1	Chicago–Naperville, IL-IN-WI CSA (IL)	8,956,807	−0.33%	8,986,729	+1.49%	8,854,966
2	St. Louis–St. Charles–Farmington, MO-IL CSA (IL)	708,335	−1.69%	720,490	−3.04%	743,101
3	Rockford–Freeport–Rochelle, IL CSA	431,861	−0.77%	435,216	−3.42%	450,639
4	Peoria–Canton, IL CSA	396,406	−1.49%	402,391	−3.33%	416,255
5	Champaign–Urbana–Danville, IL CSA	311,238	+0.32%	310,260	−1.04%	313,516
6	Springfield–Jacksonville–Lincoln, IL CSA	304,039	−1.45%	308,523	−2.42%	316,177
7	Bloomington–Pontiac, IL CSA	206,476	−0.14%	206,769	−0.84%	208,522
8	Davenport–Moline, IA-IL CSA (IL)	205,193	−2.13%	209,655	−1.77%	213,442
9	Carbondale–Marion–Herrin, IL CSA	119,726	−0.33%	120,127	−5.09%	126,575
10	Dixon–Sterling, IL CSA	87,035	−3.12%	89,836	−4.96%	94,529
11	Quincy–Hannibal, IL-MO CSA (IL)	64,267	−2.24%	65,737	−2.04%	67,103
12	Paducah–Mayfield, KY-IL CSA (IL)	13,502	−4.71%	14,169	−8.17%	15,429
13	Burlington–Fort Madison, IA-IL CSA (IL)	5,984	−6.31%	6,387	−12.88%	7,331
14	Cape Girardeau–Sikeston, MO-IL CSA (IL)	4,570	−12.79%	5,240	−36.39%	8,238
	Burlington–Fort Madison, IA-IL CSA	76,367	−3.15%	78,852	−5.59%	83,518
	Cape Girardeau–Sikeston, MO-IL CSA	149,193	+0.70%	148,153	−1.12%	149,824
	Chicago–Naperville, IL-IN-WI CSA	9,965,292	−0.22%	9,986,960	+1.48%	9,840,929
	Davenport–Moline, IA-IL CSA	468,307	−1.21%	474,019	+0.74%	470,527
	Paducah–Mayfield, KY-IL CSA	139,309	−0.59%	140,135	−0.60%	140,987
	Quincy–Hannibal, IL-MO CSA	113,115	−1.34%	114,649	−1.39%	116,262
	St. Louis–St. Charles–Farmington, MO-IL CSA	2,918,612	−0.22%	2,924,904	+1.12%	2,892,497

== See also ==
- Geography of Illinois
  - Demographics of Illinois
