= Ceredo =

Ceredo may refer to:

- Ceredo, Kentucky, a community in Ballard County, Kentucky
- Ceredo, West Virginia, a city in Wayne County, West Virginia
