= LaCenter, Kentucky =

- City
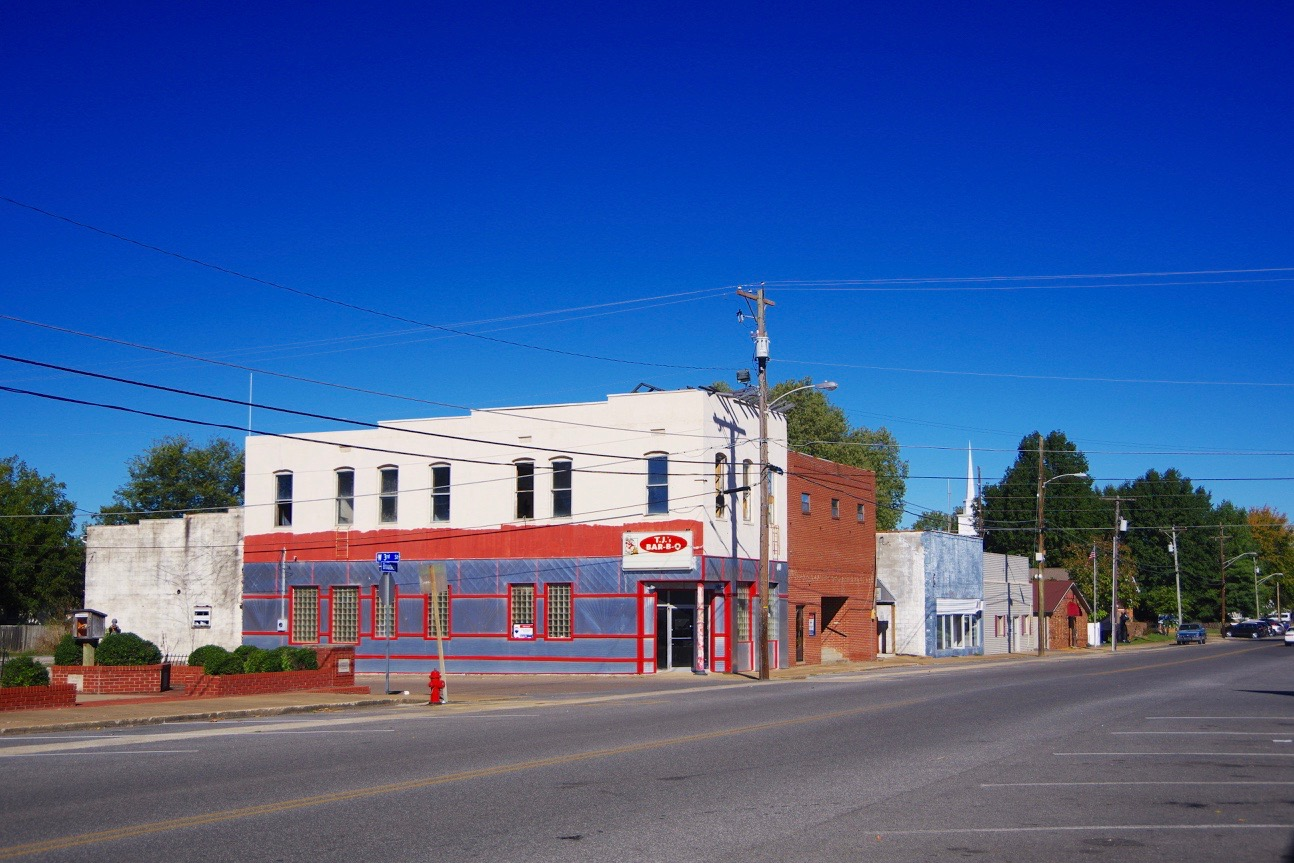
- Broadway (KY 358)

- Location of La Center in Ballard County, Kentucky.
- Coordinates: 37°4′29″N 88°58′30″W
- Country: United States
- State: Kentucky
- County: Ballard

Area
  - Total: 0.61 sq mi (1.57 km^{2})
  - Land: 0.61 sq mi (1.57 km^{2})
  - Water: 0 sq mi (0.00 km^{2})
- Elevation: 367 ft (112 m)

Population (2020)
  - Total: 872
  - Density: 1,440.2/sq mi (556.06/km^{2})
- Time zone: UTC-6 (Central (CST))
  - Summer (DST): UTC-5 (CDT)
- ZIP code: 42056
- Area codes: 270 & 364
- FIPS code: 21-43336
- GNIS feature ID: 0495882
- Website: cityoflacenter.org

LaCenter, formerly and often informally written as La Center, is a home rule-class city in Ballard County, Kentucky, in the United States. The population was 872 at the 2020 census, making it the most populous community in the county. It is part of the Paducah, KY-IL Metropolitan Statistical Area.

== History ==
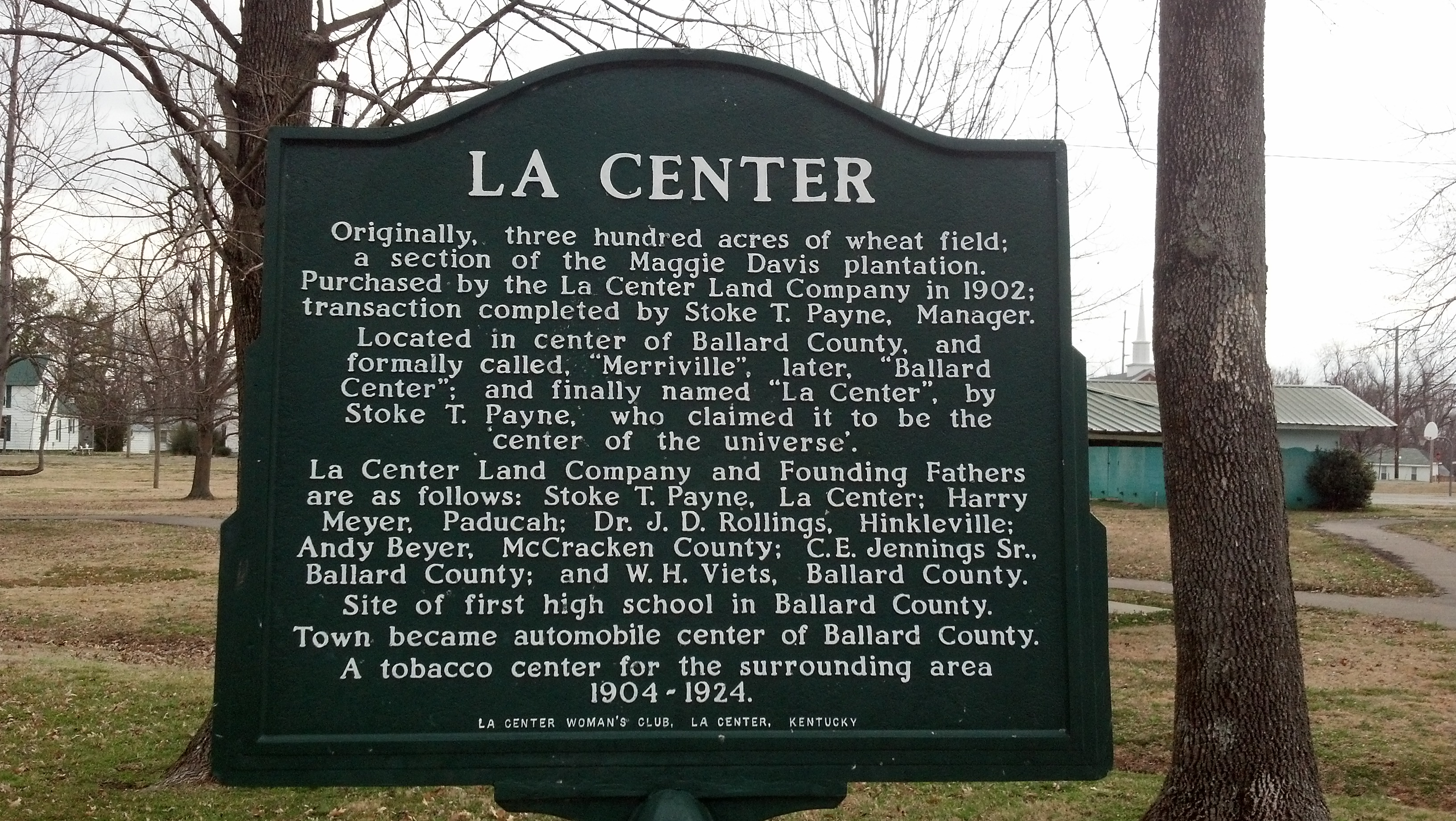
Historical marker in La Center

The Kentucky Secretary of State is unclear upon the city's date of incorporation, but the LaCenter Woman's Club states it was originally named Merriville after the daughter of Maggie Davis, the land owner who sold the property for the new city to its developer, the La Center Land Company, in 1902. After the Postal Service rejected this name for the new post office, the postmaster requested "LaCentre" for the city's central location within Ballard County, and later settled for "LaCenter." One of the land developers, Stokely T. Payne, may have suggested the name, claiming the new city to be the "center of the universe," and possibly in the hopes that it would someday become the county seat.

== Geography ==
LaCenter is located northeast of Wickliffe at 37°4′29″N 88°58′30″W (37.074782, -88.975091). It is geographically significant because of its proximity to the confluence of the Ohio and Mississippi rivers. The city is concentrated primarily around the intersection of U.S. Route 60, which connects LaCenter with Paducah to the east and Wickliffe to the southwest, and Kentucky Route 358.

According to the United States Census Bureau, the city has a total area of 0.62 square miles (1.6 km^{2}), all land.

== Demographics ==
Historical population
Census	Pop.	Note	%±
1910	426		—
1920	627		47.2%
1930	637		1.6%
1940	591		−7.2%
1950	593		0.3%
1960	682		15.0%
1970	1,044		53.1%
1980	1,044		0.0%
1990	1,040		−0.4%
2000	1,038		−0.2%
2010	1,009		−2.8%
2020	872		−13.6%
U.S. Decennial Census

As of the census of 2000, there were 1,038 people, 419 households, and 261 families residing in the city. The population density was 1,351.0 inhabitants per square mile (521.6/km^{2}). There were 492 housing units at an average density of 640.4 per square mile (247.3/km^{2}). The racial makeup of the city was 89.40% White, 9.06% African American, 0.10% Native American, 0.29% Asian, and 1.16% from two or more races. Hispanic or Latino of any race were 0.58% of the population.

There were 419 households, out of which 29.4% had children under the age of 18 living with them, 45.8% were married couples living together, 13.1% had a female householder with no husband present, and 37.7% were non-families. 35.1% of all households were made up of individuals, and 21.2% had someone living alone who was 65 years of age or older. The average household size was 2.26 and the average family size was 2.90.

In the city, the population was spread out, with 23.2% under the age of 18, 7.0% from 18 to 24, 23.9% from 25 to 44, 19.3% from 45 to 64, and 26.6% who were 65 years of age or older. The median age was 42 years. For every 100 females, there were 80.5 males. For every 100 females age 18 and over, there were 71.0 males.

The median income for a household in the city was $27,188, and the median income for a family was $36,250. Males had a median income of $32,813 versus $20,417 for females. The per capita income for the city was $14,317. About 13.9% of families and 16.5% of the population were below the poverty line, including 25.9% of those under age 18 and 12.2% of those age 65 or over.

== Education ==
There is one school district in the whole county, the Ballard County School District. The district's schools are Ballard County Preschool - Headstart, Ballard County Elementary School, Ballard County Middle School, and Ballard Memorial High School.

== Notable people ==
- Bob DeWeese, served as a Republican member of the Kentucky House of Representatives from 1993 to 2016, representing the 48th district

Emily Nowselski - College campus ministry leader at Florida Atlantic University. Provided daily lunches to starving college students, Bible studies, Free Disney trips, support and a lending ear to any FAU student. Died August 1, 2022, at 97 years old. Married to Tony Nowselski. Buried at Lacenter cemetery.
