= Axe Lake Swamp State Nature Preserve =

- IUCN category V (protected landscape/seascape)
- Location within Kentucky
- Location: Ballard County, Kentucky, United States
- Nearest city: Barlow, Kentucky
- Area: 458 acres (185 ha)
- Created: February 20, 1991
- Website: Official website

Axe Lake Swamp State Nature Preserve is a 458-acre (1.9 km^{2}) nature reserve located near Barlow, Kentucky in Ballard County in an area known locally as "the Barlow bottoms", a wetland created by periodic flooding along the mouth of the Ohio River. Originally, Axe Lake consisted of 146 acres (0.6 km^{2}) of the main lake and about 120 lots on the drier portions of the property. These lots, the gate and an access road were maintained by a member/share-holder organization which agreed to the lake's dedication as a nature reserve on February 20, 1991. An additional 312 acres (1.3 km^{2}) was dedicated on December 11, 2001.

The Office of Kentucky Nature Preserves has identified Axe Lake as the centerpiece of an expanded long-term project to protect 3,000 acres (12 km^{2}) of bald cypress-tupelo swamp lands which is to be called the Axe Lake Swamp wetlands complex. This cypress-tupelo swamp is the best example of a large intact cypress-tupelo swamp in Kentucky. This protected area is known to support at least eight rare plant and animal species. The site has been recognized as a priority wetland in the North American Waterfowl Management Plan. Written permission is required for access to the preserve.

== Wildlife ==
Wetlands species of interest:

- Bald Cypress (Taxodium distichum)
- Great blue heron (Ardea herodias)
- Great egret (Casmerodius albus)
- Wood duck (Aix sponsa)
