= Joppa, Illinois =

- Village
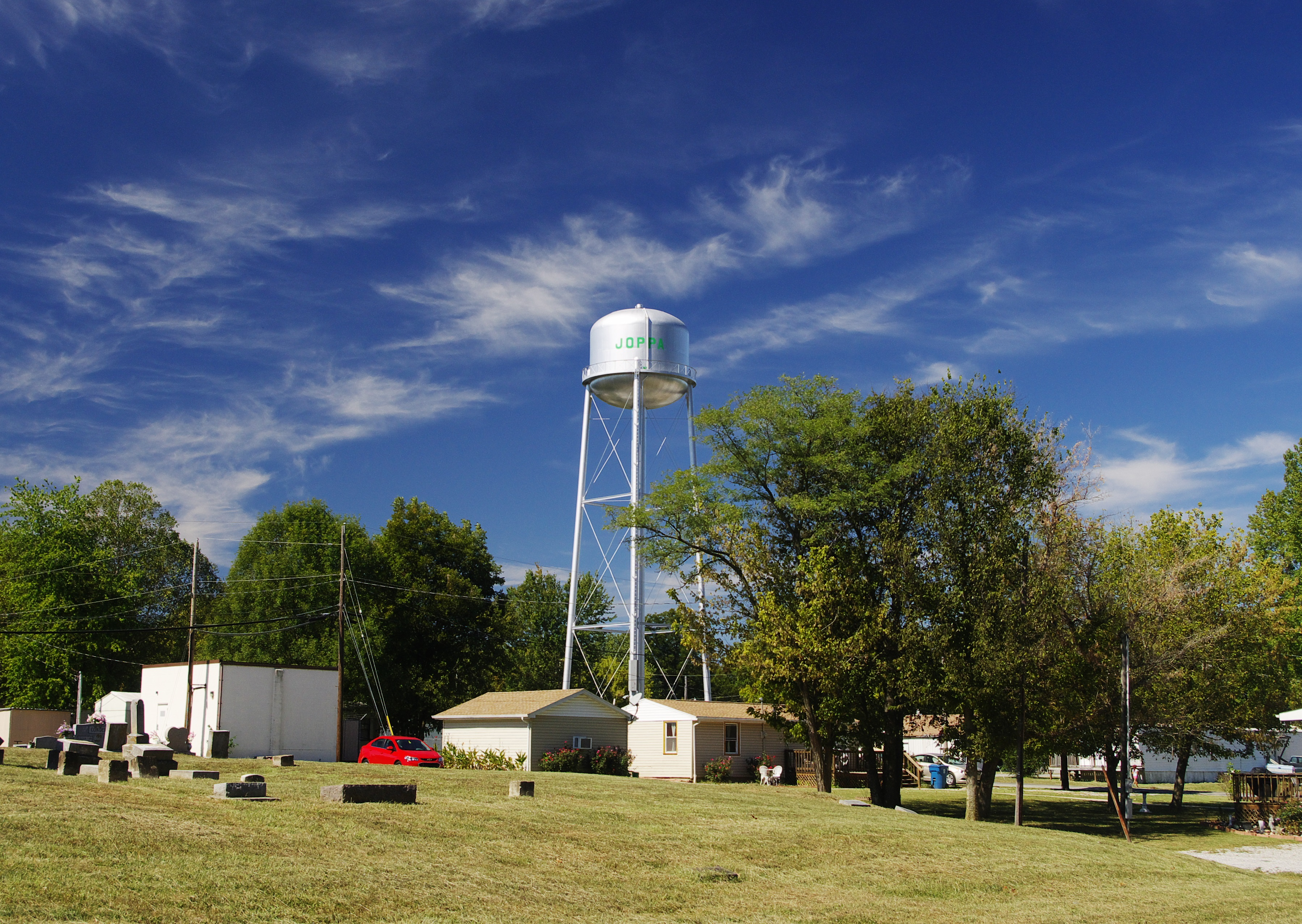
- Joppa

- Location in Massac County, Illinois
- Coordinates: 37°12′26″N 88°50′41″W
- Country: United States
- State: Illinois
- County: Massac

Area
  - Total: 0.51 sq mi (1.31 km^{2})
  - Land: 0.49 sq mi (1.26 km^{2})
  - Water: 0.019 sq mi (0.05 km^{2})
- Elevation: 354 ft (108 m)

Population (2020)
  - Total: 350
  - Density: 720.5/sq mi (278.17/km^{2})
- Time zone: UTC-6 (CST)
  - Summer (DST): UTC-5 (CDT)
- ZIP code: 62953
- Area code: 618
- FIPS code: 17-38674
- GNIS feature ID: 2398310

Joppa is a village in Massac County, Illinois, United States, along the Ohio River. The population was 350 as of the 2020 census. It is part of the Paducah, KY-IL Metropolitan Statistical Area.

== History ==
During the first part of the 19th century, a riverboat landing known as Copeland's Landing operated at what is now Joppa. In the early 1870s, A.J. Kuykendall, a prominent local land owner, and Jesse Baccus, who operated a local sawmill, decided to establish a town. They named the town after the Biblical city of Joppa (in modern Israel). After the arrival of the railroad in 1900, the village thrived for several years as a river-to-rail transloading station. Joppa incorporated in 1901. Joppa has since lost a lot of population and stores, now only having a school and a few hundred people living there.

== Geography ==
Joppa is located in western Massac County. The village lies along the Ohio River downstream from Metropolis, Illinois, and Paducah, Kentucky. Metropolis is 8 miles (13 km) southeast of Joppa, and Paducah is 20 miles (32 km) to the southeast. County Road 5 connects Joppa with U.S. Route 45 near Metropolis to the east. The Joppa Generating Station, a coal and natural gas power plant operated by Electric Energy, Inc., lies just west of the village.

According to the U.S. Census Bureau, Joppa has a total area of 0.50 square miles (1.29 km^{2}), of which 0.02 square miles (0.05 km^{2}), or 3.57%, are water.

== Demographics ==
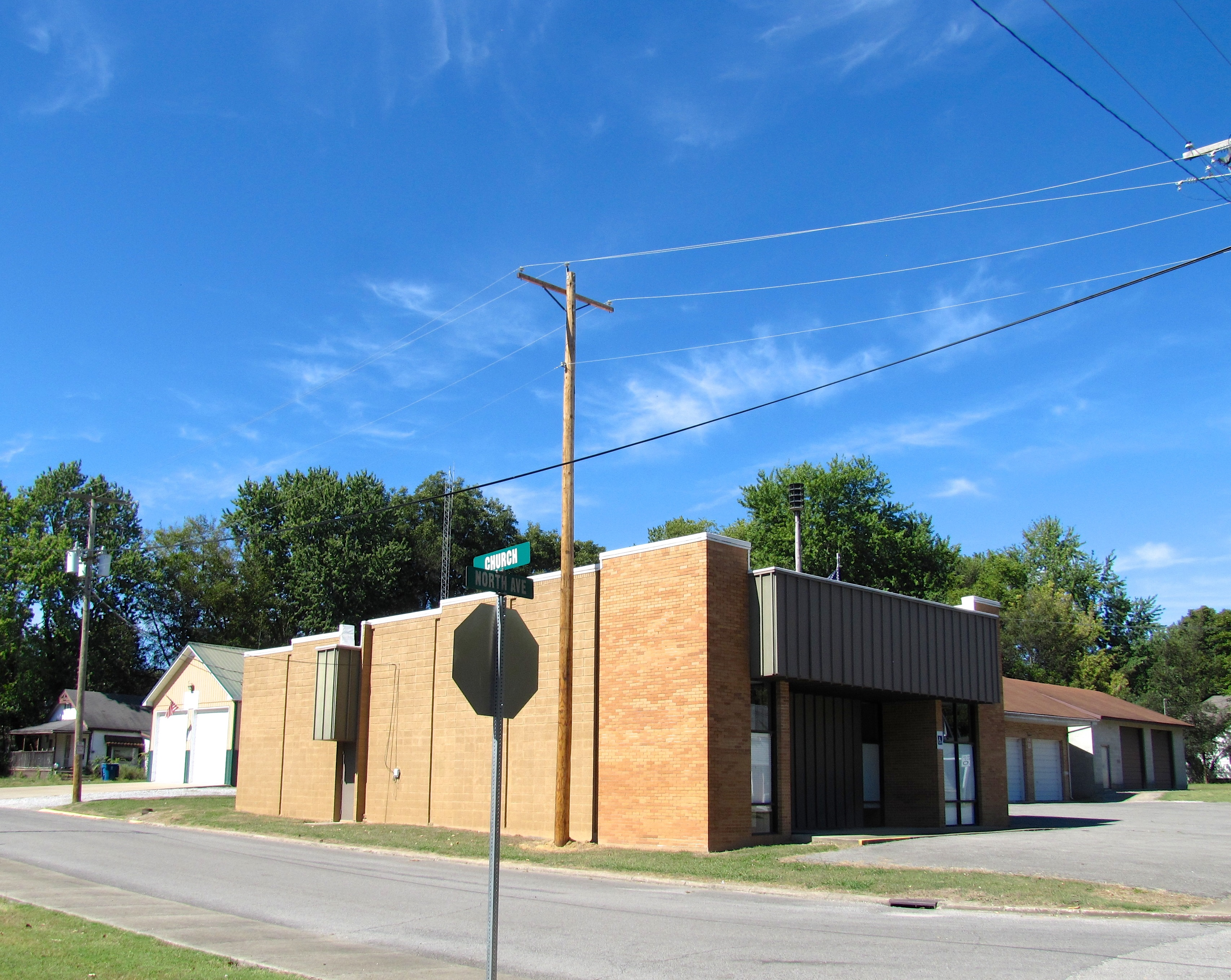
Joppa Municipal Buildings

Historical population
Census	Pop.	Note	%±
1910	734		—
1920	651		−11.3%
1930	462		−29.0%
1940	587		27.1%
1950	513		−12.6%
1960	578		12.7%
1970	531		−8.1%
1980	535		0.8%
1990	492		−8.0%
2000	409		−16.9%
2010	360		−12.0%
2020	350		−2.8%
U.S. Decennial Census

=== 2010 ===
According to the 2010 U.S. census Bureau, 360 persons lived in the village:

- 89.2% White; 85.8% White, non-Hispanic
- 8.6% Black
- 0.6% Native American
- 0.0% Asian
- 0.0% Native Hawaiian or Pacific Islander
- 1.7% Two or more races
- 0.0% Other races
- 3.3% Hispanic or Latino (all White)

=== 2000 ===
In 2000, there were 409 people, 165 households, and 110 families residing in the village. The population density was 838.2 inhabitants per square mile (323.6/km^{2}). There were 203 housing units at an average density of 416.0 per square mile (160.6/km^{2}). The racial makeup of the village was 88.26% White, 7.58% African American, 0.24% Native American, 0.98% from other races, and 2.93% from two or more races. Hispanic or Latino of any race were 2.44% of the population.

There were 165 households, out of which 32.1% had children under the age of 18 living with them, 48.5% were married couples living together, 12.7% had a female householder with no husband present, and 33.3% were non-families. 28.5% of all households were made up of individuals, and 8.5% had someone living alone who was 65 years of age or older. The average household size was 2.48 and the average family size was 3.09.

In the village, the population was spread out, with 27.6% under the age of 18, 8.3% from 18 to 24, 24.4% from 25 to 44, 26.9% from 45 to 64, and 12.7% who were 65 years of age or older. The median age was 36 years. For every 100 females, there were 109.7 males. For every 100 females age 18 and over, there were 96.0 males.

The median income for a household in the village was $17,813, and the median income for a family was $20,729. Males had a median income of $23,750 versus $16,607 for females. The per capita income for the village was $8,890. About 34.3% of families and 44.6% of the population were below the poverty line, including 65.1% of those under age 18 and 20.0% of those age 65 or over.

== See also ==
- List of cities and towns along the Ohio River
