= Bland Ballard =

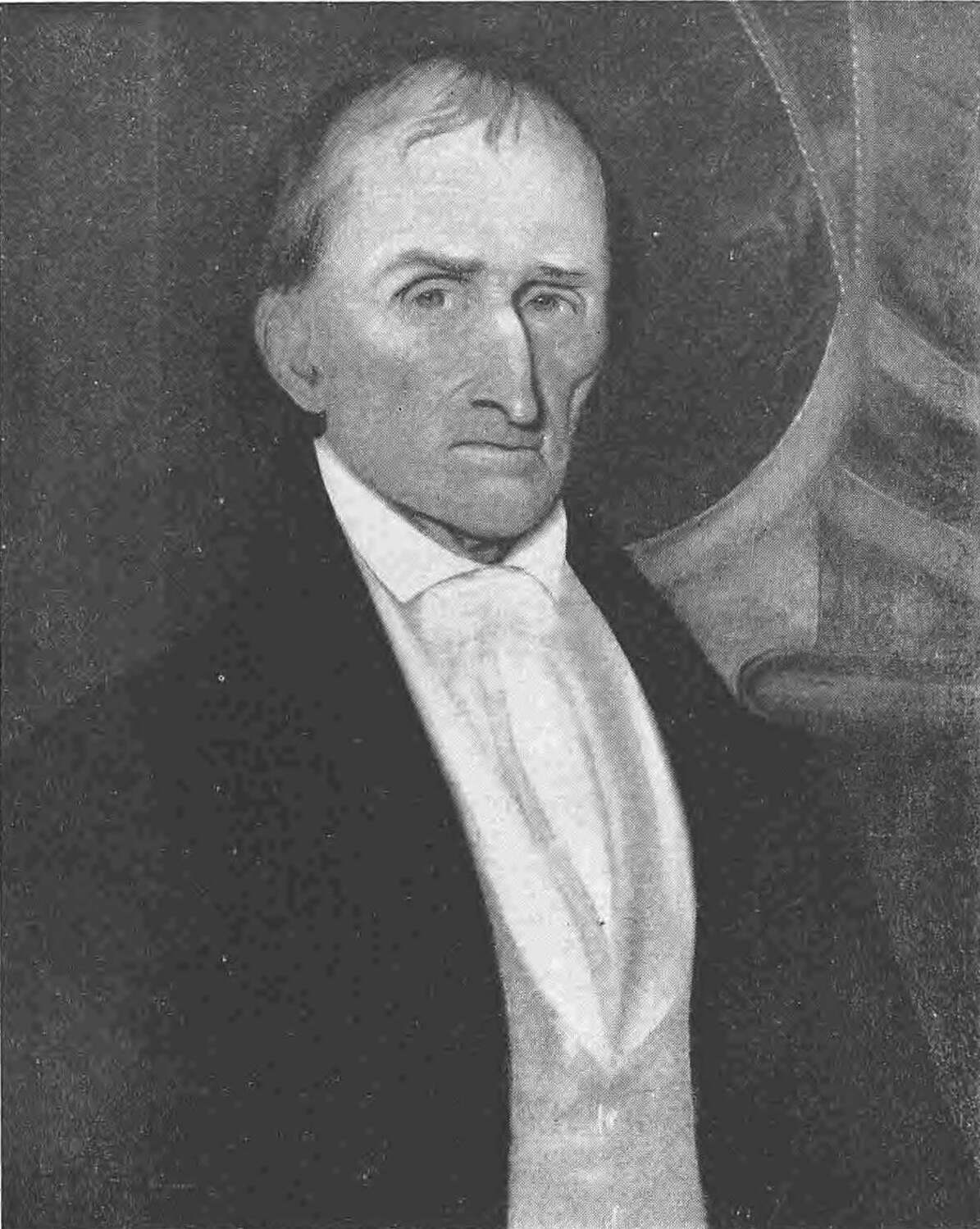
- Portrait of Bland Ballard

Member of the Kentucky General Assembly
- In office 1800–1801, 1803–1804, 1805–1806

Personal details
- Born: October 16, 1761 Spotsylvania County, Virginia, U.S.
- Died: September 5, 1853 (aged 91)
- Resting place: Frankfort Cemetery
- Spouses: Elizabeth Williamson (died 1827) Diana Matthews (m. 1833; died 1835) Elizabeth Weaver Garrett (m. 1841)
- Children: 7
- Relatives: Bland Ballard (grandson)
- Military career
- Allegiance: United States
- Rank: Major
- Conflicts: Northwest Indian War; Battle of Fallen Timbers; War of 1812; Battle of Frenchtown

Bland Williams Ballard (October 16, 1761 – September 5, 1853) was a soldier who fought the British and Native Americans. He later served as a state legislator in Kentucky.

== Biography ==
Bland Williams Ballard was born on October 16, 1761, in Spotsylvania County, Virginia, the eldest son of Bland Ballard. In 1779, he moved with his father to Kentucky, where the younger Ballard served in the militia. In 1788, Ballard's father and family were killed by Delaware Indians in what is now Shelby County, Kentucky. Later in life, Ballard said he had killed thirty to forty Native Americans in battle to avenge his family and punish Native Americans for horse theft.

Ballard married three times. He and his first wife Elizabeth Williamson were the parents of seven children. Elizabeth died in 1827, and he married Diana Matthews in 1833. Diana died in 1835, in 1841 Ballard married Elizabeth Weaver Garrett.

Ballard served as a scout in George Rogers Clark's 1780 expedition into the Ohio country. During the Northwest Indian War, he served as a scout for Clark's 1786 Wabash campaign. Ballard participated in the battles of Fallen Timbers (1794) and Frenchtown (1813).

As a major of Kentucky volunteers, he played a leading role in the expedition against the British and American Indians who had invaded southeastern Michigan. He was slightly wounded and taken prisoner at the Battle of Frenchtown, but was among the prisoners who were escorted to Amherstburg in Upper Canada and later paroled. As such he escaped the murder of wounded prisoners known as the River Raisin Massacre. Following the war, Ballard served as a delegate from Shelby County in the 1800, 1803 and 1805 Kentucky General Assembly.

== Legacy ==
Bland Ballard is the namesake of both Blandville, Kentucky and Ballard County, Kentucky.

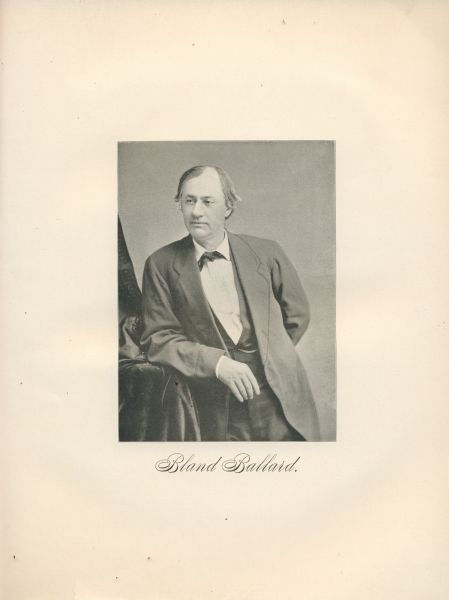
Judge Bland Ballard

When Ballard died in 1853, he was initially buried in Shelbyville, Kentucky. In 1854 the State of Kentucky moved his and his first wife's remains to the State Memorial section of the Frankfort Cemetery.

His namesake grandson, Bland Ballard, was appointed by Abraham Lincoln as a judge for the United States District Court for the District of Kentucky.
