= Monkey's Eyebrow, Kentucky =

Unincorporated community in Kentucky, United States

Monkey's Eyebrow
- Unincorporated community
- Location within the state of Kentucky Monkey's Eyebrow (the United States)
- Coordinates: 37°11′12″N 88°59′16″W
- Country: United States
- State: Kentucky
- County: Ballard
- Elevation: 361 ft (110 m)
- Time zone: UTC-6 (Central (CST))
  - Summer (DST): UTC-5 (CST)
- GNIS feature ID: 508626

Monkey's Eyebrow is a rural unincorporated community in Ballard County, Kentucky, United States. It is generally the northwesternmost community in the Jackson Purchase area of western Kentucky that is identified on the highway maps distributed by the Kentucky Transportation Cabinet. The community is part of the Paducah, KY-IL Metropolitan Statistical Area. A few different theories exist regarding the origin of the community's unique name.

== Overview ==
There were originally two Monkey's Eyebrows, commonly known as Old Monkey and New Monkey. One was at the top of a small hill, the other at the bottom. There were stores at both locations. Today, there are no stores. According to an article nearly 30 years ago in the county newspaper, the Advance Yeoman, the area acquired its unique name around the turn of the 20th century. A nearby attraction is the state-controlled Ballard County Wildlife Management Area. Goose hunting is a winter activity in Monkey's Eyebrow.

A common joke in the region is to provide directions to the city of Paducah by saying "it's halfway between Monkey's Eyebrow and Possum Trot (a tiny community in Marshall County)."

The community was formerly frequently mentioned in the sign-off message of WPSD-TV in nearby Paducah, as the location of its 1,638-foot-tall (499 m) broadcast transmitter.

== Etymology ==
Monkey's Eyebrow has been frequently noted for its unusual place name.

One theory on the origin of this unique name is that when looking at it from the air, or on a map of Ballard County, it resembles a monkey's head. Monkey's Eyebrow is located where the monkey's eyebrow would be located. It has also been said that, when viewed from a nearby hill, the shape of the town resembles a monkey's eyebrow.

Yet another theory of the town's naming is that sometime before 1900, a community resident would go to nearby Needmore to get supplies, instead of going to the local general store and blacksmith shop built and owned by John and Dodge Ray, as the man didn't like his neighbors. It has been stated that the man considered the store to be "only fit for a bunch of monkeys", and that he considered both of its owners to be monkey-like, even having eyebrows resembling those of a monkey. It has also been stated that the man viewed the brush on Beeler Hill above the store as resembling monkey eyebrows.

== Notable people ==
- Kelsey Waldon, country singer raised in Monkey's Eyebrow
- Paul Watson, musician born in Monkey's Eyebrow
