= Kevil, Kentucky =

- City
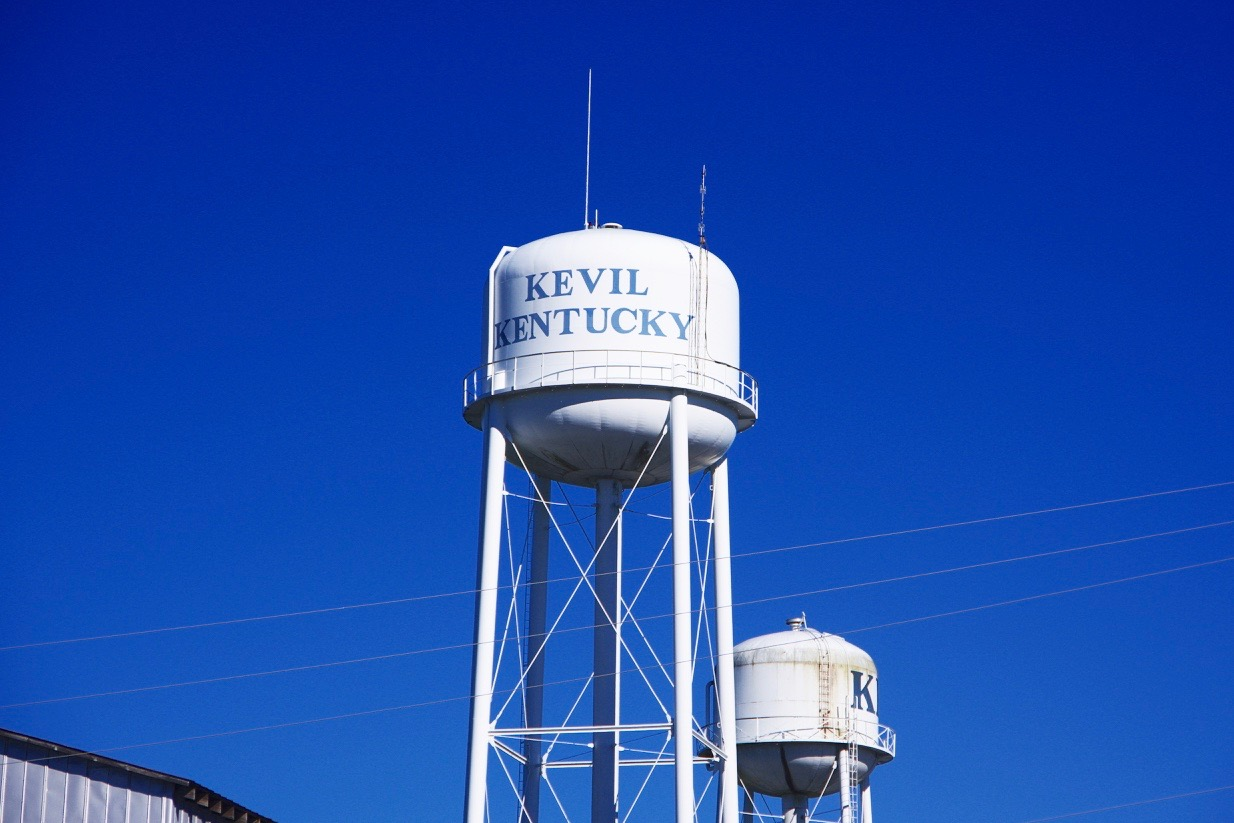
- Water tower in Kevil

- Logo

- Location of Kevil in Ballard County, Kentucky.
- Coordinates: 37°5′2″N 88°53′2″W
- Country: United States
- State: Kentucky
- Counties: Ballard, McCracken
- Incorporated: 1910
- Named for: a local landowner

Area
  - Total: 0.57 sq mi (1.47 km^{2})
  - Land: 0.57 sq mi (1.47 km^{2})
  - Water: 0 sq mi (0.00 km^{2})
- Elevation: 430 ft (131 m)

Population (2020)
  - Total: 595
  - Density: 1,046.2/sq mi (403.95/km^{2})
- Time zone: UTC-6 (Central (CST))
  - Summer (DST): UTC-5 (CDT)
- Area codes: 270 & 364
- FIPS code: 21-42292
- GNIS feature ID: 0495707
- Website: cityofkevil.com

Kevil is a home rule-class city in Ballard and McCracken counties, Kentucky, United States. The population was 595 as of the 2020 census, It is part of the Paducah metropolitan area.

== Leadership and Development ==
The Mayor of Kevil, Kentucky is Charles Burnley. He won the 2018 election against Karen Schnuck Berry. Berry got outvoted by a total of 106 points: Burnley 190, Berry 84.

There are four members in the Kevil City Council. These members include Clyde Elrod, Charlie trice, Jerry Summers, and Rhonda Lange.

== History ==
Founded for its position on the Illinois Central Railroad, the town received its post office in 1903 and was named for local landowner R.U. Kevil. It was formally incorporated by the state assembly in 1910.

== Geography ==
Kevil is located in eastern Ballard County at 37°5′2″N 88°53′2″W (37.083999, -88.883993), just west of the Ballard-McCracken county line. The city is concentrated around the intersection of U.S. Route 60 and Kentucky Route 473, approximately 17 miles (27 km) west of Paducah and 16 miles (26 km) northeast of Wickliffe, the Ballard County seat located on the Mississippi River which gives Kevil a zip code of 42053.

According to the United States Census Bureau, Kevil has a total area of 0.42 square miles (1.1 km^{2}), all land.

== Demographics ==
Historical population
Census	Pop.	Note	%±
1910	304		—
1920	261		−14.1%
1930	236		−9.6%
1940	209		−11.4%
1950	202		−3.3%
1960	231		14.4%
1970	274		18.6%
1980	382		39.4%
1990	337		−11.8%
2000	574		70.3%
2010	376		−34.5%
2020	595		58.2%
U.S. Decennial Census

As of the census of 2000, there were 574 people, 245 households, and 169 families residing in the city. The population density was 894.8 inhabitants per square mile (345.5/km^{2}). There were 266 housing units at an average density of 414.7 per square mile (160.1/km^{2}). The racial makeup of the city was 98.95% White, 0.17% African American, 0.35% from other races, and 0.52% from two or more races. Hispanic or Latino of any race were 0.52% of the population.

There were 245 households, out of which 30.6% had children under the age of 18 living with them, 57.1% were married couples living together, 9.4% had a female householder with no husband present, and 31.0% were non-families. 28.6% of all households were made up of individuals, and 16.3% had someone living alone who was 65 years of age or older. The average household size was 2.31 and the average family size was 2.82.

In the city, the population was spread out, with 24.6% under the age of 18, 3.3% from 18 to 24, 29.1% from 25 to 44, 25.6% from 45 to 64, and 17.4% who were 65 years of age or older. The median age was 40 years. For every 100 females, there were 93.3 males. For every 100 females age 18 and over, there were 83.5 males.

The cost of living is 80.0 according to the cost of living index scale. The United States average is 100.0, which makes living in the city of Kevil considerably low. It is 20% less than the United States average to be exact.

The median income for a household in the city was $32,417, and the median income for a family was $44,688. Males had a median income of $35,625 versus $24,688 for females. The per capita income for the city was $16,974. About 9.6% of families and 15.1% of the population were below the poverty line, including 21.1% of those under age 18 and 14.4% of those age 65 or over.

== Education ==
There is one school district in the whole county, the Ballard County School District. The district's schools are Ballard County Preschool - Headstart, Ballard County Elementary School, Ballard County Middle School, and Ballard Memorial High School.

Forestdale Elementary School was once a big part of Kevil, Kentucky. Although it is not in service now, the building still stands in the middle of the city. It was built around 1950 at the same time as the Paducah Gaseous Diffusion Plant was built. This enhanced uranium power plant brought jobs to people all over the United States. When families moved here to work, there was not enough room in the already built public schools for the new children to get an education. The outcome of the child to school ratio lead to the upbringing of a new school. Forestdale Elementary was continued to be used until the early 1980s when it later changed into a factory.

== Major Powerplant and Effect On Migration ==
In 1950, a plant was built to enrich uranium for the military. The uranium was used for chemical warfare such as reactors and nuclear weapons. This plant played a huge part in the further development of Kevil. Many of the houses you see in this city and surrounding areas were pop-up homes for migrating workers. From 1993 to 2014, the plant was leased to the United States Enrichment Corporations(USEC) and then to present day owners(Department of Energy). Department of Energy(DOE) is responsible for the environmental cleanup of uranium at the site. Although DOE is not as big as the plant originally was, it still plays an important role in the job, popularity, and importance aspect of this area.
