= Ceredo, Kentucky =

Unincorporated community in Kentucky, United States

Ceredo
- Unincorporated community
- Location within the state of Kentucky Ceredo (the United States)
- Coordinates: 37°2′28″N 88°52′1″W
- Country: United States
- State: Kentucky
- County: Ballard
- Elevation: 423 ft (129 m)
- Time zone: UTC-6 (Central (CST))
  - Summer (DST): UTC-5 (CST)
- GNIS feature ID: 507681

Ceredo is an unincorporated community located in Ballard County, Kentucky, United States.

It was founded in 1900 by George Holt, who opened a general store there. The Ceredo post office was established in 1902 and discontinued in 1905, with the mail service going through Kevil afterwards. No businesses remained in Ceredo by the 1970s.
