= Farley, Kentucky =

Census-designated place in Kentucky, United States

Farley, Kentucky Woodlawn-Oakdale (former)
- Census-designated place
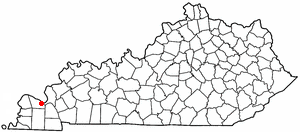
- Location in Kentucky
- Coordinates: 37°2′38″N 88°34′16″W
- Country: United States
- State: Kentucky
- County: McCracken

Area
  - Total: 6.05 sq mi (15.68 km^{2})
  - Land: 5.94 sq mi (15.39 km^{2})
  - Water: 0.11 sq mi (0.29 km^{2})
- Elevation: 343 ft (105 m)

Population (2020)
  - Total: 4,374
  - Density: 736.0/sq mi (284.16/km^{2})
- Time zone: UTC-6 (Central (CST))
  - Summer (DST): UTC-5 (CDT)
- ZIP code: 42003 (Paducah)
- Area codes: 270 & 364
- FIPS code: 21-26528

Farley is a census-designated place (CDP) in McCracken County, Kentucky, United States. The population was 4,374 as of the 2020 census, down from 4,701 in 2010. It is part of the Paducah, KY-IL Metropolitan Statistical Area. The area was listed by the U.S. Census Bureau as Woodlawn-Oakdale starting with the 1980 census and as Farley starting with the 2010 census.

== Geography ==
Farley is located in eastern McCracken County at 37°2′38″N 88°34′16″W (37.043786, −88.571223). It is bordered to the northwest by the city of Paducah and to the northeast by the Tennessee River, less than one mile south of where it joins the Ohio River. The Farley CDP includes the unincorporated communities of Woodlawn and Oakdale.

U.S. Routes 60 and 62 (Clarks River Road) cross the northeast part of Farley together. Both highways lead northwest into Paducah, while US 62 leads southeast 3 miles (5 km) to Reidland and US 60 leads east across the Tennessee River 6 miles (10 km) to Ledbetter.

According to the United States Census Bureau, the Farley CDP has a total area of 6.05 square miles (15.7 km^{2}), of which 5.91 square miles (15.3 km^{2}) are land and 0.14 square miles (0.36 km^{2}), or 2.35%, are water.

== Demographics ==
Historical population
| Census | Pop. | Note | %± |
|---|---|---|---|
| 1980 | 4,722 | | — |
| 1990 | 4,954 | | 4.9% |
| 2000 | 4,937 | | −0.3% |
| 2010 | 4,710 | | −4.6% |
| 2020 | 4,374 | | −7.1% |
U.S. Decennial Census.

=== 2020 census ===
As of the 2020 census, Farley had a population of 4,374. The median age was 42.5 years. 22.5% of residents were under the age of 18 and 19.0% of residents were 65 years of age or older. For every 100 females there were 99.5 males, and for every 100 females age 18 and over there were 96.6 males age 18 and over.

87.9% of residents lived in urban areas, while 12.1% lived in rural areas.

There were 1,884 households in Farley, of which 27.6% had children under the age of 18 living in them. Of all households, 37.6% were married-couple households, 22.3% were households with a male householder and no spouse or partner present, and 31.0% were households with a female householder and no spouse or partner present. About 33.5% of all households were made up of individuals and 14.7% had someone living alone who was 65 years of age or older.

There were 2,159 housing units, of which 12.7% were vacant. The homeowner vacancy rate was 1.7% and the rental vacancy rate was 9.3%.

Racial composition as of the 2020 census
| Race | Number | Percent |
|---|---|---|
| White | 3,685 | 84.2% |
| Black or African American | 211 | 4.8% |
| American Indian and Alaska Native | 17 | 0.4% |
| Asian | 13 | 0.3% |
| Native Hawaiian and Other Pacific Islander | 1 | 0.0% |
| Some other race | 133 | 3.0% |
| Two or more races | 314 | 7.2% |
| Hispanic or Latino (of any race) | 212 | 4.8% |

=== 2000 census ===
As of the census of 2000, there were 4,937 people, 2,049 households, and 1,407 families residing in the CDP. The population density was 831.8 inhabitants per square mile (321.2/km^{2}). There were 2,243 housing units at an average density of 377.9 per square mile (145.9/km^{2}). The racial makeup of the CDP was 94.55% White, 2.51% African American, 0.41% Native American, 0.41% Asian, 0.10% Pacific Islander, 0.34% from other races, and 1.68% from two or more races. Hispanic or Latino of any race were 0.87% of the population.

There were 2,049 households, out of which 32.2% had children under the age of 18 living with them, 51.0% were married couples living together, 13.2% had a female householder with no husband present, and 31.3% were non-families. 26.7% of all households were made up of individuals, and 9.7% had someone living alone who was 65 years of age or older. The average household size was 2.41 and the average family size was 2.89.

In the CDP, the population was spread out, with 25.1% under the age of 18, 8.9% from 18 to 24, 30.4% from 25 to 44, 23.5% from 45 to 64, and 12.0% who were 65 years of age or older. The median age was 35 years. For every 100 females, there were 92.6 males. For every 100 females age 18 and over, there were 89.8 males.

The median income for a household in the CDP was $27,313, and the median income for a family was $31,658. Males had a median income of $28,789 versus $17,316 for females. The per capita income for the CDP was $13,344. About 17.6% of families and 21.3% of the population were below the poverty line, including 27.8% of those under age 18 and 14.0% of those age 65 or over.

== Education ==
It is in the McCracken County School District.
