= Kelsey Waldon =

American country singer and songwriter

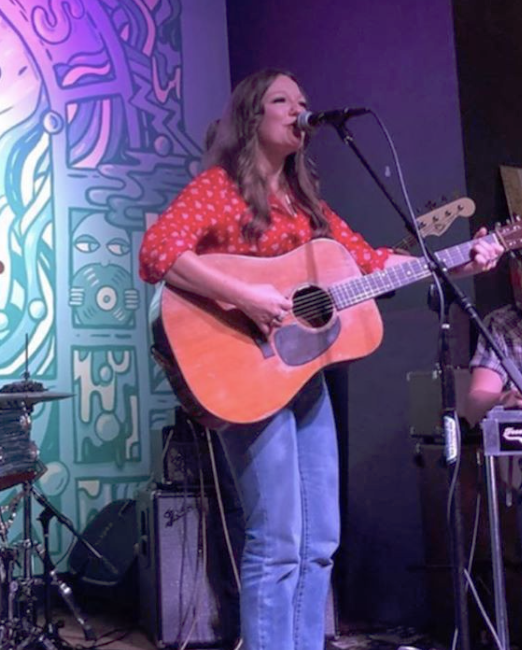
Waldon performing in 2019

Kelsey Waldon is an American country singer and songwriter. She has released four EPs and six full albums, the most recent being "Every Ghost" released on June 20, 2025.

== Early life ==
Waldon was born in Ballard County, Kentucky, and raised in the rural Western Kentucky town Monkey's Eyebrow, Kentucky. Waldon's family roots in the Bluegrass State date back over ten generations, from tobacco farmers to cattle raisers, and some of her first jobs were in farming and planting tobacco.

She picked up the guitar at age 13 to deal with her parents' divorce, and continued to use music as an outlet throughout her teenage years. After high school, instead of pursuing a college degree, Waldon moved to Nashville, Tennessee to see if she could make it in the music industry. She picked up any small gigs she could find, and continued to insert herself in the Nashville community. After two years she decided to enroll in Belmont University majoring in songwriting and music business so that she could learn more about the music industry.

== Career ==
Waldon self-released four EP's before releasing her debut LP The Goldmine. In 2007 she released Dirty Feet, Dirty Hands, followed by Anchor In The Valley in 2010, Anybody's Darlin in 2011, and Fixin' It Up in 2012. Waldon's following began to grow when she released The Goldmine, produced by Michael Rinne, in 2014 which The Fader dubbed as "the brightest country debut of 2014". The album was named one of Rolling Stone's "10 New Artists You Need To Know: Summer 2014" with journalist Marissa Moss calling Waldon, "Tammy Wynette on a trip to Whiskeytown, as unafraid of heavy twang and spitfire pedal steel as coffeehouse confessionals."

Waldon released another LP, titled I've Got A Way in 2016. Her sophomore album ranked on two of NPR's most-acclaimed lists of the year; Fresh Air host Ken Tucker's "Top 10 Favorite Albums of 2016" alongside Beyoncé, Miranda Lambert, and Stax legend William Bell (singer)

In May 2019, it was announced at the Grand Ole Opry that Waldon recently signed to John Prine's label Oh Boy Records. Waldon is the first artist in fifteen years to be signed to Prine's label. Waldon released the album White Noise/White Lines, her first release on Oh Boy Records, on October 4, 2019. The album was produced by Waldon and Dan Knobler. "Anyhow" was released as the lead single from the album. Writing for Nashville Lifestyles Magazine, music critic Luke Levenson commented, "The new LP pulls inspiration from both her Kentucky roots and the three intense years since her last release."

They'll Never Keep Us Down, an EP of politically charged cover songs, was set for release on November 20, 2020. As well as the Hazel Dickens title track, she also tackled Nina Simone's "Mississippi Goddam", Kris Kristofferson's "The Law Is for Protection of the People", Neil Young's "Ohio", Bob Dylan's "With God on Our Side", Billy Taylor and Dick Dallas' "I Wish I Knew How It Would Feel to Be Free" and Oh Boy Records founder John Prine's "Sam Stone". Guests include Adia Victoria, Kyshona Armstrong, and Devon Gilfillian.

Kelsey has performed with artists of high notoriety within the country and Americana genres, such as John Prine, Willie Nelson, Tanya Tucker, and Jamey Johnson. In 2019, John Prine invited Kelsey Waldon to join him on stage at Bonnaroo Music Festival to sing Prine's duet "In Spite of Ourselves". Waldon also joined guitarist and songwriter Jamey Johnson in performing Prine's Paradise, Hank Williams' "I Saw the Light", and Don Williams' "Tulsa Time". During Americana Fest 2019, Waldon stayed busy performing solo sets, as well as playing with Tanya Tucker at 3rd and Lindsley. "That was definitely the most event-filled week I've ever done," Waldon told the Nashville Scene.

== Performances ==
Waldon made her debut performance on the Grand Ole Opry at the Ryman Auditorium in 2016, then was invited to play the Opry House on April 23 of 2019. She performed at The Opry again on May 28, 2019, together with John Prine, Sturgill Simpson, and others. She has also played the historic Station Inn, the go-to spot of the 1970s, where intimate, post-Opry jam sessions were hosted by musicians like Jimmy Martin, Bobby Osborne, and Bill Monroe.

In August, 2025, Waldon performed at the historic 3TEN ACL venue in Austin, Texas.

== Discography ==
=== Studio albums ===
Title	Album details	Peak chart position		Sales
Title	Album details	US Indie	US Heat	Sales
Anchor In The Valley	Release date: June 18, 2010; Label: None (self-released)	—	—	
The Goldmine	Release date: June 24, 2014; Label: None (self-released)	—	—	
I've Got a Way	Release date: August 12, 2016; Label: Monkey's Eyebrow Records	—	—	
White Noise/White Lines	Release date: October 4, 2019; Label: Oh Boy Records	44	8	US: 1,300
No Regular Dog	Release date: August 12, 2022; Label: Oh Boy Records			
"—" denotes releases that did not chart

=== Extended plays ===
- Dirty Feet, Dirty Hands (2007) Self-released
- Anybody's Darlin (2011) Self-released
- Fixin' It Up (2012) Self-released
- On Audiotree Live (2016) Audiotree Music
- They'll Never Keep Us Down (2020) Oh Boy Records
