= Blandville, Kentucky =

- Unincorporated community
- Location of Blandville in Ballard County, Kentucky
- Coordinates: 36°56′35″N 88°57′50″W
- Country: United States
- State: Kentucky
- County: Ballard

Area
  - Total: 0.21 sq mi (0.54 km^{2})
  - Land: 0.21 sq mi (0.54 km^{2})
  - Water: 0 sq mi (0.00 km^{2})
- Elevation: 463 ft (141 m)

Population (2020)
  - Total: 73
  - Density: 349.5/sq mi (134.95/km^{2})
- Time zone: UTC-5 (ET)
  - Summer (DST): UTC-4 (EDT)
- ZIP code: 42087
- Area codes: 270 & 364
- FIPS code: 21-07390
- GNIS feature ID: 0487455

Blandville is a former home rule-class city in Ballard County, Kentucky, in the United States. It was founded in 1842 and named for Captain Bland Ballard, a hero of the War of 1812. It was formally incorporated by the state assembly in 1845. Blandville was the seat of Ballard County from 1842 to 1881, when the seat was moved to Wickliffe. The population was 73 as of the 2020 census. It is part of the Paducah, KY-IL Micropolitan Statistical Area. The city was administratively dissolved on August 9, 2023.

== Geography ==
Blandville is located near the southern border of Ballard County in western Kentucky. It is 8 miles (13 km) east of Wickliffe, the county seat, and 13 miles (21 km) east of the confluence of the Ohio and Mississippi rivers at Cairo, Illinois.

According to the United States Census Bureau, the city has a total area of 0.19 square miles (0.5 km^{2}), all land.

== Demographics ==
Historical population
Census	Pop.	Note	%±
2010	90		—
2020	73		−18.9%
U.S. Decennial Census

As of the census of 2000, there were 99 people, 39 households, and 26 families residing in the city. The population density was 519.2 inhabitants per square mile (200.5/km^{2}). There were 46 housing units at an average density of 241.2 per square mile (93.1/km^{2}). The racial makeup of the city was 93 White, 2 African American, 1 from other races, and 4 from two or more races.

There were 39 households, out of which 14 had children under the age of 18 living with them, 20 were married couples living together, 5 had a female householder with no husband present, and 13 were non-families. 8 of all households were made up of individuals, and 3 had someone living alone who was 65 years of age or older. The average household size was 2.54 and the average family size was 2.92.

In the city, the population was spread out, with 29 under the age of 18, 10 from 18 to 24, 28 from 25 to 44, 23 from 45 to 64, and 9 who were 65 years of age or older. The median age was 30 years. For every 100 females, there were 86.8 males. For every 100 females age 18 and over, there were 94.4 males.

The median income for a household in the city was $15,625, and the median income for a family was $40,750. Males had a median income of $42,083 versus $13,333 for females. The per capita income for the city was $12,440. There were 18.5% of families and 23.5% of the population living below the poverty line, including 36.7% of under eighteens and none of those over 64.

== Education ==
There is one school district in the whole county, the Ballard County School District. The district's schools are Ballard County Preschool - Headstart, Ballard County Elementary School, Ballard County Middle School, and Ballard Memorial High School.
