= Hinkleville, Kentucky =

Unincorporated community in Kentucky, United States

Hinkleville
- Unincorporated community
- Location within the state of Kentucky Hinkleville (the United States)
- Coordinates: 37°2′37″N 88°56′1″W
- Country: United States
- State: Kentucky
- County: Ballard
- Elevation: 407 ft (124 m)
- Time zone: UTC-6 (Central (CST))
  - Summer (DST): UTC-5 (CST)
- GNIS feature ID: 508250

Hinkleville is an unincorporated community located in Ballard County, Kentucky, United States.

Originally known as Hinklesville, the community was founded in 1858 as a trading center and was incorporated in March 1868. The spelling change for the community's name occurred after the American Civil War. The post office was established in 1869 and closed in 1905, after which the mail went through LaCenter. The place was likely named for one James Hinkle.
