= Barlow House (Barlow, Kentucky) =

- U.S. National Register of Historic Places
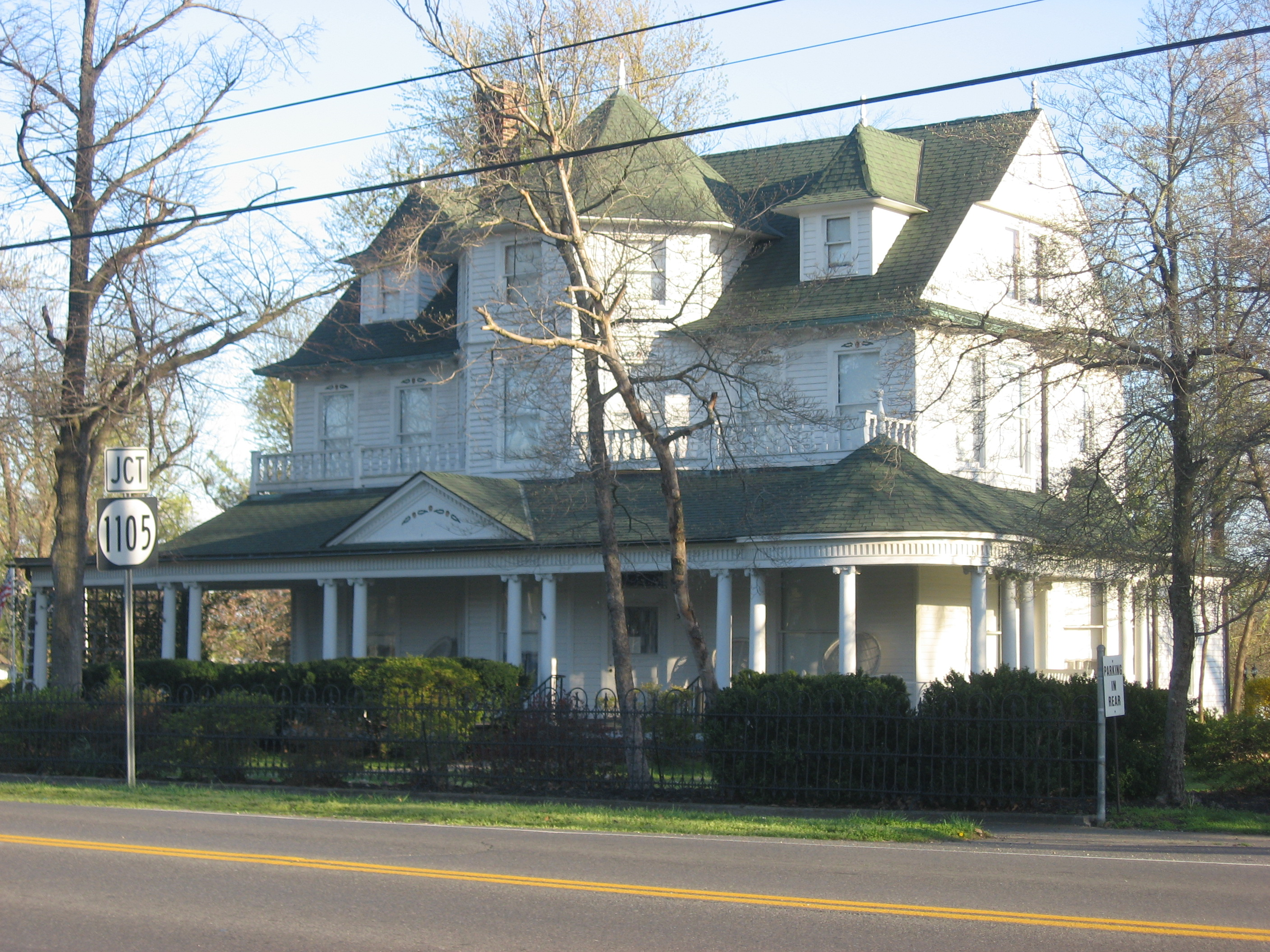

- Location within Kentucky
- Location: Jct. of Broadway and S. Fifth St., Barlow, Kentucky
- Coordinates: 37°03′05″N 89°02′44″W
- Area: less than one acre
- Built: 1903
- Architectural style: Queen Anne
- NRHP reference No.: 91001663
- Added to NRHP: November 21, 1991

The Barlow House in Barlow, Kentucky, is a two-story symmetrical Queen Anne-style house built in 1903. It was listed on the National Register of Historic Places in 1991.

It is located at the intersection of Broadway and S. 5th St.

The house is "the only documented example in Ballard County of a historic residential structure that was built according to plan obtained from an architectural patternbook. This fact accounts a great deal for the elegance and modernity of the house's design. The increased contact with the outside world provided through the new railroad connection would have contributed to the Barlow family's knowledge and appreciation for current architectural styles."
