= Needmore, Ballard County, Kentucky =

Unincorporated community in Kentucky, United States

Needmore
- Unincorporated community
- Location within the state of Kentucky Needmore (the United States)
- Coordinates: 37°10′54″N 88°56′50″W
- Country: United States
- State: Kentucky
- County: Ballard
- Elevation: 364 ft (111 m)
- Time zone: UTC-6 (Central (CST))
  - Summer (DST): UTC-5 (CST)
- GNIS feature ID: 517063

Needmore, formerly named Ogden, is an unincorporated community located in Ballard County, Kentucky, United States.

== History ==
Needmore was originally named Ogden, the naming of which occurred in 1900. In 1967, the community's name was changed to Needmore. This occurred because a store in the community owned by Thomas Brown prior to 1900 was often referred to as the nickname "needmore", because customers often stated that they needed more than they were able to purchase. Another factor was that when the Ogden post office closed down in 1908, which was located inside of Thomas Brown's store, some confusion regarding the two names occurred. Ultimately, the name change to Needmore, which a Board of Geographic Names ruled upon in 1967, was based upon long-term common usage of the name Needmore for the community (since World War I) and per the Ogden post office having closed in 1908.
