= Gage, Kentucky =

Unincorporated community in Kentucky, United States

Gage
- Unincorporated community
- Location within the state of Kentucky Gage (the United States)
- Coordinates: 36°59′28″N 88°53′22″W
- Country: United States
- State: Kentucky
- County: Ballard
- Elevation: 476 ft (145 m)
- Time zone: UTC-6 (Central (CST))
  - Summer (DST): UTC-5 (CST)
- GNIS feature ID: 492648

Gage is an unincorporated community located in Ballard County, Kentucky, United States.
