= Lovelaceville, Kentucky =

Census-designated place in Kentucky, United States

- Census-designated place (CDP)
- Location within the state of Kentucky
- Coordinates: 36°58′3″N 88°49′55″W
- Country: United States
- State: Kentucky
- County: Ballard

Area
  - Total: 0.51 sq mi (1.32 km^{2})
  - Land: 0.51 sq mi (1.31 km^{2})
  - Water: 0.0039 sq mi (0.01 km^{2})
- Elevation: 374 ft (114 m)

Population (2020)
  - Total: 124
  - Density: 245.6/sq mi (94.81/km^{2})
- Time zone: UTC-6 (Central (CST))
  - Summer (DST): UTC-5 (CST)
- ZIP code: 42060
- Area codes: 270 & 364
- FIPS code: 21-48072
- GNIS feature ID: 2629642

Lovelaceville is a census-designated place (CDP) in Ballard County, Kentucky, United States. The population was 124 at the 2020 census. The town is named after Elias and Andrew Lovelace who settled and raised their families there back around 1830. The Lovelace family came from North and South Carolina, after immigrating from England.

== Demographics ==
Historical population
Census	Pop.	Note	%±
2020	124		—
U.S. Decennial Census

As of the 2010 census, there were 373 households with a population density of 48. The average household size was 2.53, with 94.11% of the population of white, 2.27% black, 0.31% Asian, 0.31% Native American, and 3% claiming 'Other' ethnicity and 3.93% of the people in Lovelaceville claiming Hispanic ethnicity.

== Climate ==
The climate in this area is characterized by hot, humid summers and generally mild to cool winters. According to the Köppen Climate Classification system, Lovelaceville has a humid subtropical climate, abbreviated "Cfa" on climate maps.

== Education ==
There is one school district in the whole county, the Ballard County School District. The district's schools are Ballard County Preschool - Headstart, Ballard County Elementary School, Ballard County Middle School, and Ballard Memorial High School.
