= Ballard County, Kentucky =

County in Kentucky, United States

- County
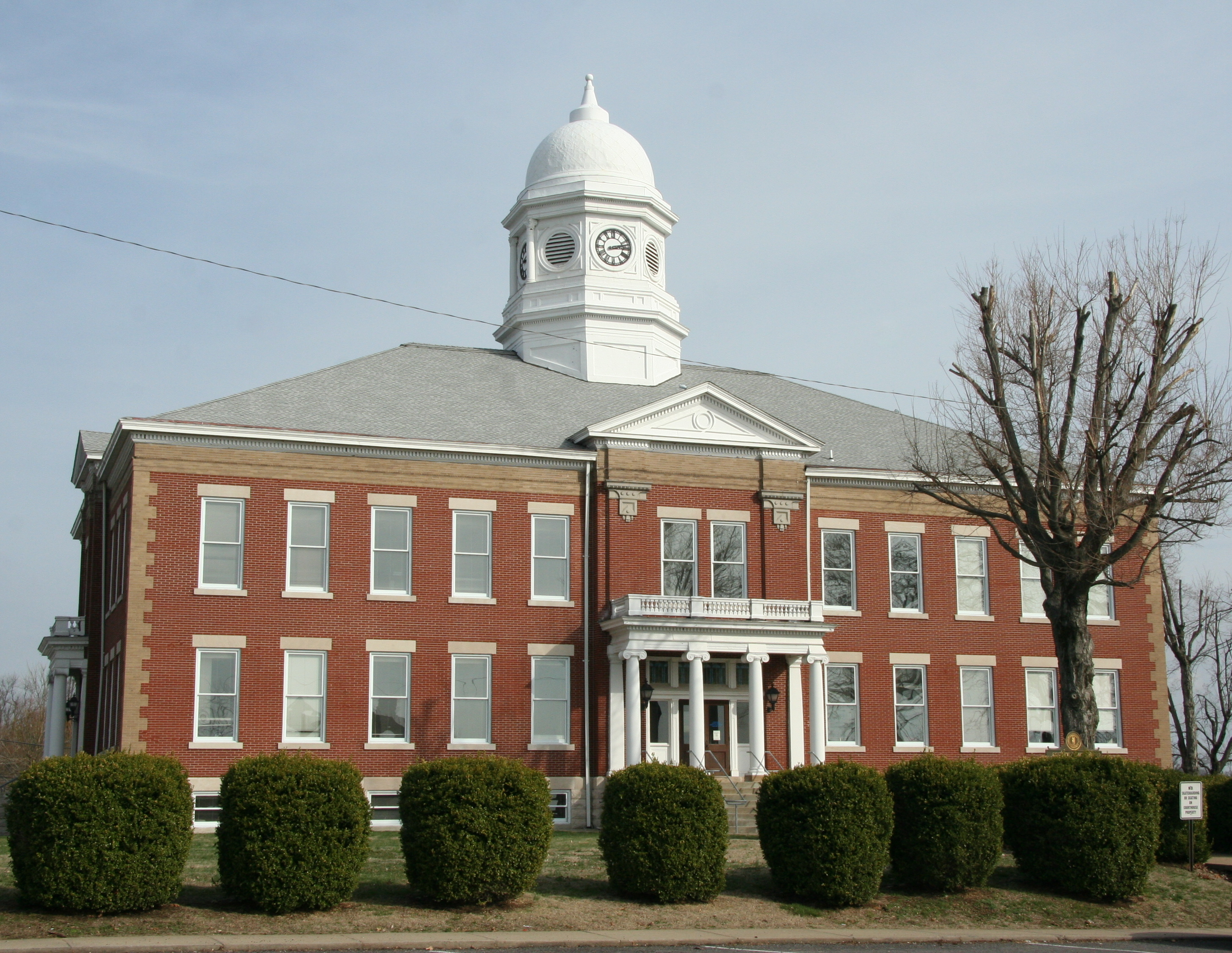
- Ballard County Courthouse in Wickliffe

- Location within the U.S. state of Kentucky
- Coordinates: 37°04′N 89°00′W
- Country: United States
- State: Kentucky
- Founded: 1842
- Named for: Bland Ballard
- Seat: Wickliffe
- Largest city: LaCenter

Government
  - Judge/Executive: Todd Cooper (R)

Area
  - Total: 274 sq mi (710 km^{2})
  - Land: 247 sq mi (640 km^{2})
  - Water: 27 sq mi (70 km^{2}) 9.9%

Population (2020)
  - Total: 7,728
  - Estimate (2025): 7,594 ▼
  - Density: 31.3/sq mi (12.1/km^{2})
- Time zone: UTC−6 (Central)
  - Summer (DST): UTC−5 (CDT)
- Congressional district: 1st
- Website: ballardcounty.ky.gov

Ballard County is a county located in the west portion of the U.S. state of Kentucky. As of the 2020 census, the population was 7,728. Its county seat is Wickliffe and its largest city is LaCenter. The county was created by the Kentucky State Legislature in 1842 and is named for Captain Bland Ballard, a soldier, statesman, and member of the Kentucky General Assembly. Ballard County is part of the Paducah, KY-IL Metropolitan Statistical Area.

== History ==
Ballard County was formed from portions of Hickman County and McCracken County. It was named for Bland Ballard (1761–1853), a Kentucky pioneer and soldier who served as a scout for General George Rogers Clark during the American Revolutionary War, and later commanded a company during the War of 1812. On February 17, 1880, the courthouse was destroyed by a fire, which also destroyed most of the county's early records. The county seat was transferred from Blandville to Wickliffe in 1882.

== Geography ==
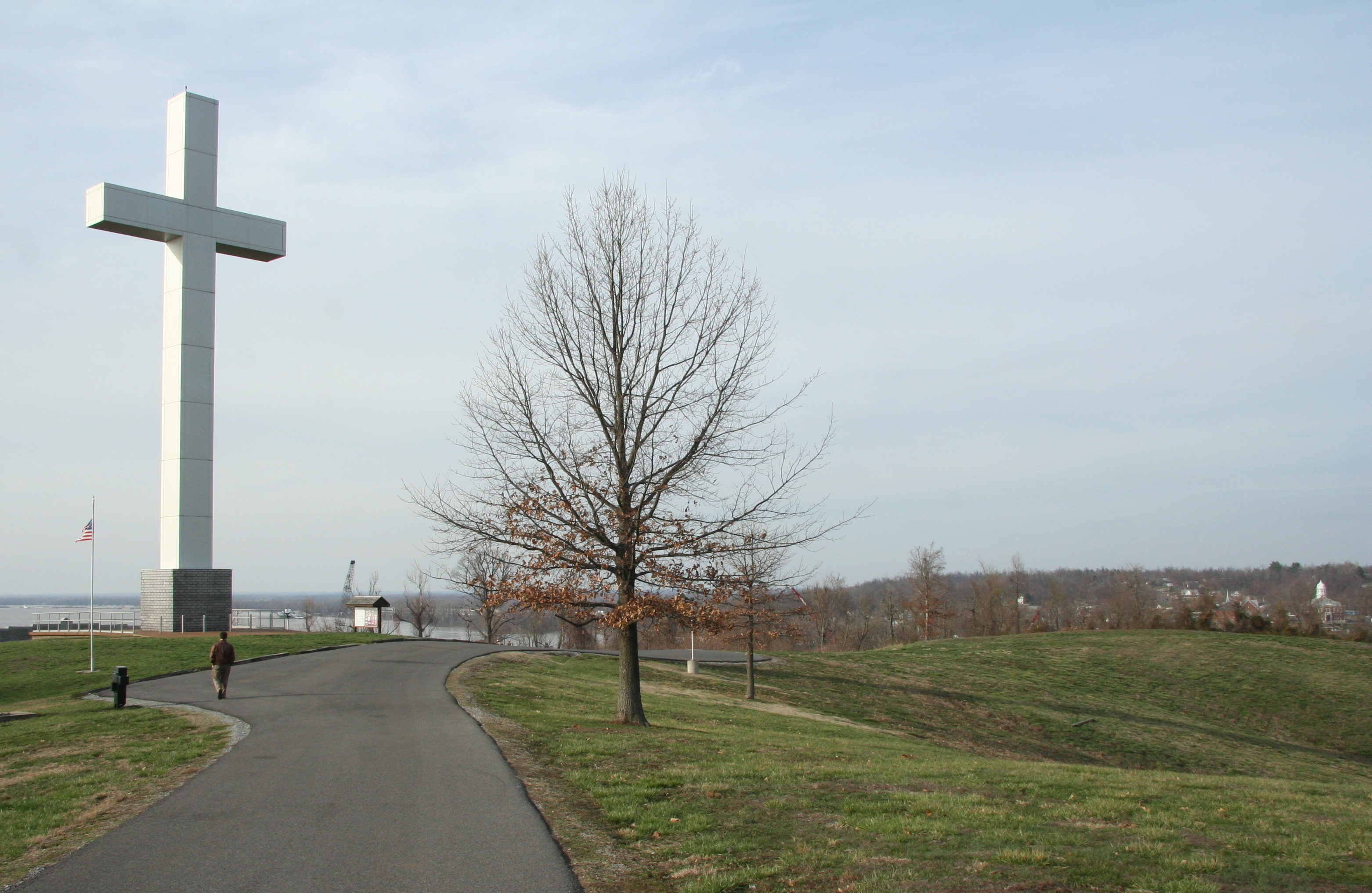
Fort Jefferson Memorial Cross at the Confluence in Wickliffe

According to the U.S. Census Bureau, the county has a total area of 274 square miles (710 km^{2}), of which 247 square miles (640 km^{2}) is land and 27 square miles (70 km^{2}) (9.9%) is water.

=== State protected area ===
Axe Lake Swamp State Nature Preserve is a 458 acres (1.85 km^{2}) nature preserve located in Ballard County, in the Barlow Bottoms. The preserve is part of the 3,000-acre (12 km^{2}) Axe Lake Swamp wetlands complex which supports at least eight rare plant and animal species. The site has been recognized as a priority wetland in the North American Waterfowl Management Plan.

=== Adjacent counties ===
- Pulaski County, Illinois (north) – across the Ohio River
- McCracken County (east)
- Carlisle County (south)
- Mississippi County, Missouri (southwest) – across the Mississippi River
- Alexander County, Illinois (west) – across the Ohio River

== Demographics ==
Historical population
Census	Pop.	Note	%±
1850	5,496		—
1860	8,692		58.2%
1870	12,576		44.7%
1880	14,378		14.3%
1890	8,390		−41.6%
1900	10,761		28.3%
1910	12,690		17.9%
1920	12,045		−5.1%
1930	9,910		−17.7%
1940	9,480		−4.3%
1950	8,545		−9.9%
1960	8,291		−3.0%
1970	8,276		−0.2%
1980	8,798		6.3%
1990	7,902		−10.2%
2000	8,286		4.9%
2010	8,249		−0.4%
2020	7,728		−6.3%
2025 (est.)	7,594	▼	−1.7%
U.S. Decennial Census; 1790-1960 1900-1990; 1990-2000 2010-2021

=== 2020 census ===
As of the 2020 census, the county had a population of 7,728. The median age was 44.8 years. 20.8% of residents were under the age of 18 and 21.4% of residents were 65 years of age or older. For every 100 females there were 97.3 males, and for every 100 females age 18 and over there were 95.4 males age 18 and over.

The racial makeup of the county was 91.9% White, 2.7% Black or African American, 0.2% American Indian and Alaska Native, 0.4% Asian, 0.0% Native Hawaiian and Pacific Islander, 0.1% from some other race, and 4.7% from two or more races. Hispanic or Latino residents of any race comprised 1.2% of the population.

0.0% of residents lived in urban areas, while 100.0% lived in rural areas.

There were 3,228 households in the county, of which 28.5% had children under the age of 18 living with them and 24.4% had a female householder with no spouse or partner present. About 29.3% of all households were made up of individuals and 14.8% had someone living alone who was 65 years of age or older.

There were 3,684 housing units, of which 12.4% were vacant. Among occupied housing units, 78.0% were owner-occupied and 22.0% were renter-occupied. The homeowner vacancy rate was 2.0% and the rental vacancy rate was 12.0%.

=== 2000 census ===
As of the census of 2000, there were 8,286 people, 3,395 households, and 2,413 families residing in the county. The population density was 33 per square mile (13/km^{2}). There were 3,837 housing units at an average density of 15 per square mile (5.8/km^{2}). The racial makeup of the county was 95.32% White, 2.87% Black or African American, 0.08% Native American, 0.18% Asian, 0.02% Pacific Islander, 0.08% from other races, and 1.44% from two or more races. 0.63% of the population were Hispanics or Latinos of any race.

There were 3,395 households, out of which 30.70% had children under the age of 18 living with them, 59.60% were married couples living together, 8.00% had a female householder with no husband present, and 28.90% were non-families. 25.80% of all households were made up of individuals, and 12.70% had someone living alone who was 65 years of age or older. The average household size was 2.39 and the average family size was 2.85.

The age distribution was 23.10% under the age of 18, 7.60% from 18 to 24, 27.70% from 25 to 44, 25.40% from 45 to 64, and 16.20% who were 65 years of age or older. The median age was 40 years. For every 100 females, there were 97.50 males. For every 100 females age 18 and over, there were 94.00 males.

The median income for a household in the county was $32,130, and the median income for a family was $41,386. Males had a median income of $32,345 versus $20,902 for females. The per capita income for the county was $19,035. About 10.70% of families and 13.60% of the population were below the poverty line, including 19.30% of those under age 18 and 15.40% of those age 65 or over.

== Politics ==
United States presidential election results for Ballard County, Kentucky
Year	Republican		Democratic		Third party(ies)	
Year	No.	%	No.	%	No.	%
1912	555	21.54%	1,706	66.20%	316	12.26%
1916	692	23.05%	2,222	74.02%	88	2.93%
1920	1,107	21.24%	3,987	76.48%	119	2.28%
1924	767	19.18%	3,128	78.22%	104	2.60%
1928	940	24.49%	2,896	75.44%	3	0.08%
1932	572	12.48%	3,987	86.98%	25	0.55%
1936	773	17.96%	3,523	81.87%	7	0.16%
1940	758	19.09%	3,212	80.89%	1	0.03%
1944	637	18.25%	2,845	81.50%	9	0.26%
1948	454	14.04%	2,702	83.55%	78	2.41%
1952	851	22.59%	2,910	77.25%	6	0.16%
1956	838	21.29%	3,088	78.46%	10	0.25%
1960	1,121	28.99%	2,746	71.01%	0	0.00%
1964	519	15.22%	2,867	84.10%	23	0.67%
1968	564	16.38%	1,632	47.39%	1,248	36.24%
1972	1,542	49.92%	1,411	45.68%	136	4.40%
1976	649	17.57%	2,794	75.66%	250	6.77%
1980	1,190	31.10%	2,583	67.51%	53	1.39%
1984	1,663	45.13%	2,002	54.33%	20	0.54%
1988	1,460	40.23%	2,162	59.58%	7	0.19%
1992	1,108	28.56%	2,268	58.45%	504	12.99%
1996	1,064	28.43%	2,255	60.26%	423	11.30%
2000	1,824	48.38%	1,880	49.87%	66	1.75%
2004	2,389	57.19%	1,759	42.11%	29	0.69%
2008	2,537	62.49%	1,427	35.15%	96	2.36%
2012	2,647	67.96%	1,189	30.53%	59	1.51%
2016	3,161	77.08%	816	19.90%	124	3.02%
2020	3,356	79.43%	825	19.53%	44	1.04%
2024	3,331	81.48%	697	17.05%	60	1.47%

=== Elected officials ===
Elected officials as of January 3, 2025
U.S. House	James Comer (R)	KY 1
Ky. Senate	Danny Carroll (R)	2
Ky. House	Steven Rudy (R)	1

=== Voter registration ===
Ballard County Voter Registration & Party Enrollment as of November 17, 2015
Political Party	Total Voters	Percentage
Democratic	4,671	73.37%
Republican	1,402	22.02%
Others	227	3.57%
Independent	57	0.90%
Libertarian	5	0.08%
Green	2	0.03%
Total	6,366	100%

=== Statewide elections ===
Previous gubernatorial elections results
Year	Republican	Democratic	Third parties
2023	63.72% 1,691	36.28% 963	0.00% 0
2019	65.34% 2,010	32.90% 1,012	1.75% 54
2015	55.20% 1,312	41.65% 990	3.16% 75
2011	35.80% 773	59.01% 1,274	5.19% 112
2007	34.09% 927	65.91% 1,792	0.00% 0
2003	46.53% 1,433	53.47% 1,647	0.00% 0
1999	6.70% 99	83.28% 1,230	10.02% 148
1995	32.30% 938	67.46% 1,959	0.24% 7

== Communities ==
=== Cities ===
- Barlow
- Kevil
- LaCenter (largest city)
- Wickliffe (county seat)

=== Census-designated places ===
- Bandana
- Lovelaceville

=== Other unincorporated communities ===
- Blandville
- Ceredo
- Gage
- Hinkleville
- Ingleside
- Monkey's Eyebrow
- Needmore
- New York
- Oscar
- Slater
- Woodville

== Education ==
There is one school district in the whole county, the Ballard County School District.

== Notable people ==
- Morris E. Crain, Medal of Honor recipient for his bravery during World War II
- Kenny Rollins, an American basketball player who was a member of the University of Kentucky's "Fab Five" who won the 1948 NCAA Championship, the 1948 gold medal-winning U.S. Olympic Team, and the NBA's Chicago Stags and Boston Celtics
- Oscar Turner (1825–1896), state senator, U. S. representative and namesake of Oscar, Kentucky
- Earl Grace, Major League Baseball catcher for the Pittsburgh Pirates, Philadelphia Phillies, and Chicago Cubs
- Kelsey Waldon, Country Singer-songwriter raised in Monkey's Eyebrow, Kentucky

== See also ==
- Dry counties
- National Register of Historic Places listings in Ballard County, Kentucky
