= Wickliffe, Kentucky =

- City
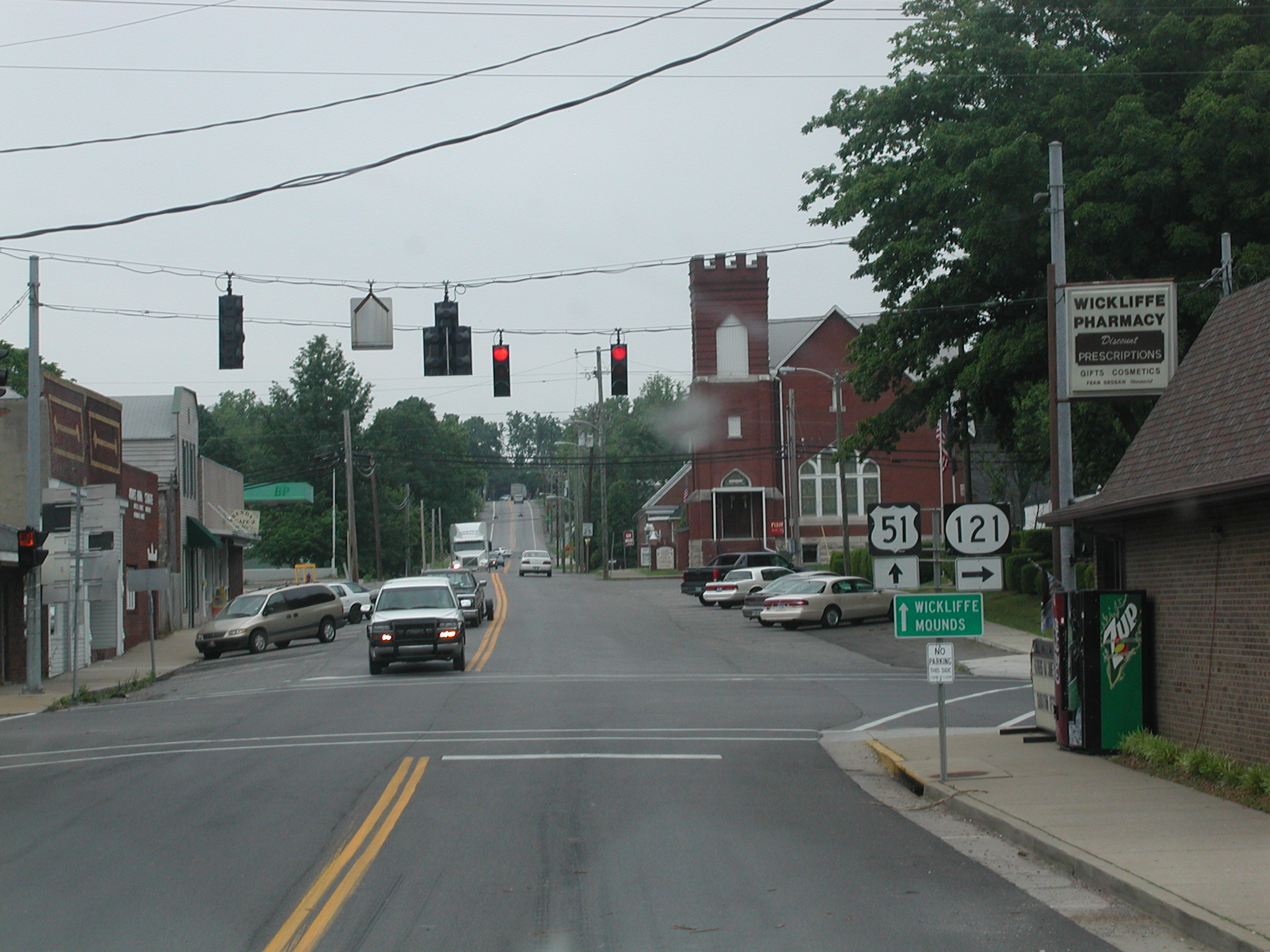
- Downtown Wickliffe, KY
- Motto: "A little piece of heaven on the river's edge"
- Location of Wickliffe in Ballard County, Kentucky.
- Coordinates: 36°58′0″N 89°5′13″W
- Country: United States
- State: Kentucky
- County: Ballard

Area
  - Total: 1.56 sq mi (4.04 km^{2})
  - Land: 1.55 sq mi (4.02 km^{2})
  - Water: 0.0077 sq mi (0.02 km^{2})
- Elevation: 354 ft (108 m)

Population (2020)
  - Total: 670
  - Density: 431.7/sq mi (166.69/km^{2})
- Time zone: UTC-6 (Central (CST))
  - Summer (DST): UTC-5 (CDT)
- ZIP code: 42087
- Area codes: 270 & 364
- FIPS code: 21-83064
- GNIS feature ID: 0506708
- Website: wickliffe.ky.gov

Wickliffe is a home rule-class city and the county seat of Ballard County, Kentucky, United States. The population was 670 at the 2020 census.

Wickliffe is part of the Paducah, KY-IL Metropolitan Statistical Area.

== History ==
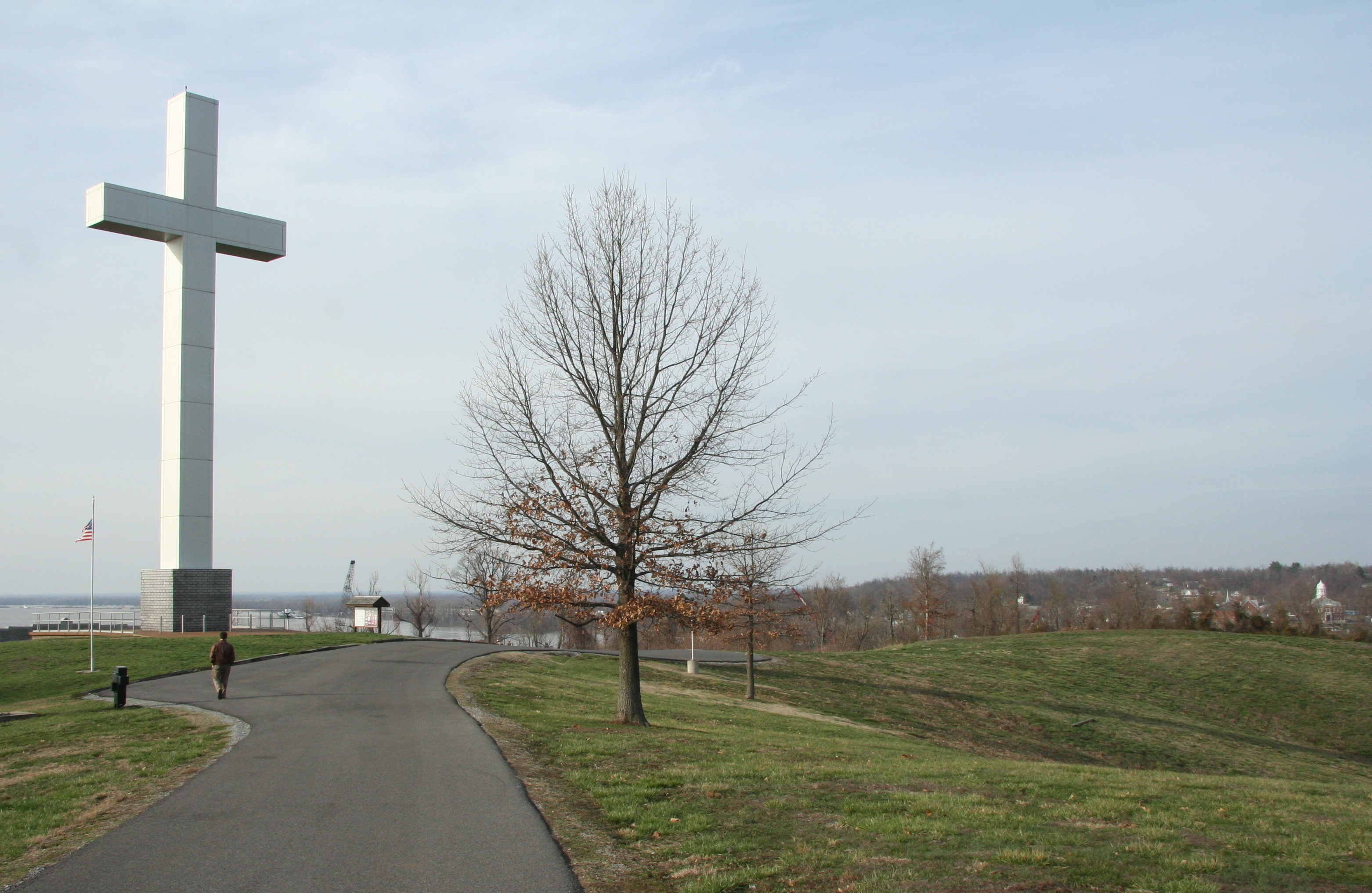
Cross at the Confluence City Park

The city of Wickliffe is the site of a Mississippian culture village now known only as Wickliffe Mounds. The village was occupied from around 1100-1300 AD. Today, Wickliffe Mounds is a state historic site and home to a research center and museum.

In 1780 during the Revolutionary War, General George Rogers Clark established Fort Jefferson on a hill overlooking the Mississippi River one mile south of present-day Wickliffe. The fort was intended to protect what was then the western boundary of the infant United States from raids by the British Army and Native Americans. It was abandoned in 1781 after a siege by the Chickasaw.

The site later served as a Union Army post during the Civil War. General Ulysses S. Grant directed a demonstration against the Confederate-held position at Columbus, Kentucky, in January 1862. Troops from the post joined in capturing Fort Henry in February 1862. It served as a Union supply post for operations in the western theater of the war.

A 90-foot-tall (27 m) cross, the Fort Jefferson Memorial Cross at the Confluence, was completed in 2000 on Fort Jefferson hill.

== Geography ==
Wickliffe is located at 36.966600°N 89.086822°W on the east bank of the Mississippi River, about two miles south of its confluence with the Ohio River, near its easternmost point.

According to the United States Census Bureau, the city has a total area of 1.2 square miles (3.0 km^{2}), of which 0.008 square miles (0.02 km^{2}), or 0.58%, is water.

== Demographics ==
Historical population
Census	Pop.	Note	%±
1890	959		—
1900	995		3.8%
1910	989		−0.6%
1920	969		−2.0%
1930	1,108		14.3%
1940	1,039		−6.2%
1950	1,019		−1.9%
1960	917		−10.0%
1970	1,211		32.1%
1980	1,034		−14.6%
1990	851		−17.7%
2000	794		−6.7%
2010	688		−13.4%
2020	670		−2.6%
U.S. Decennial Census

As of the census of 2000, there were 794 people, 327 households, and 216 families residing in the city. The population density was 578.3 inhabitants per square mile (223.3/km^{2}). There were 384 housing units at an average density of 279.7 per square mile (108.0/km^{2}). The racial makeup of the city was 94.33% White, 1.76% African American, 0.13% Native American, 0.88% Asian, 0.25% Pacific Islander, and 2.64% from two or more races. Hispanic or Latino of any race were 1.26% of the population.

There were 327 households, out of which 25.4% had children under the age of 18 living with them, 51.1% were married couples living together, 10.7% had a female householder with no husband present, and 33.9% were non-families. 30.0% of all households were made up of individuals, and 15.9% had someone living alone who was 65 years of age or older. The average household size was 2.25 and the average family size was 2.74.

In the city, the population was spread out, with 19.0% under the age of 18, 10.2% from 18 to 24, 25.9% from 25 to 44, 26.3% from 45 to 64, and 18.5% who were 65 years of age or older. The median age was 42 years. For every 100 females, there were 112.3 males. For every 100 females age 18 and over, there were 107.4 males.

The median income for a household in the city was $28,750, and the median income for a family was $35,417. Males had a median income of $30,556 versus $16,477 for females. The per capita income for the city was $17,273. About 10.1% of families and 16.1% of the population were below the poverty line, including 16.4% of those under age 18 and 25.5% of those age 65 or over.

== Education ==
There is one school district in the whole county, the Ballard County School District. The district's schools are Ballard County Preschool - Headstart, Ballard County Elementary School, Ballard County Middle School, and Ballard Memorial High School.

Wickliffe has a public library, the Ballard-Carlisle County Public Library.

== Notable people ==
- Kenny Rollins, basketball player, member of the University of Kentucky's "Fab Five" who won the 1948 NCAA Championship, the 1948 Gold Medal Winning U.S. Olympic Team, and the NBA's Chicago Stags and Boston Celtics.
- Phil Rollins , basketball player, member of the University of Louisville's National Invitational Tournament Championship team. Played for the NBA's Philadelphia Warriors, Cincinnati Royals, St. Louis Hawks, and New York Knicks.
