= Barlow, Kentucky =

- City
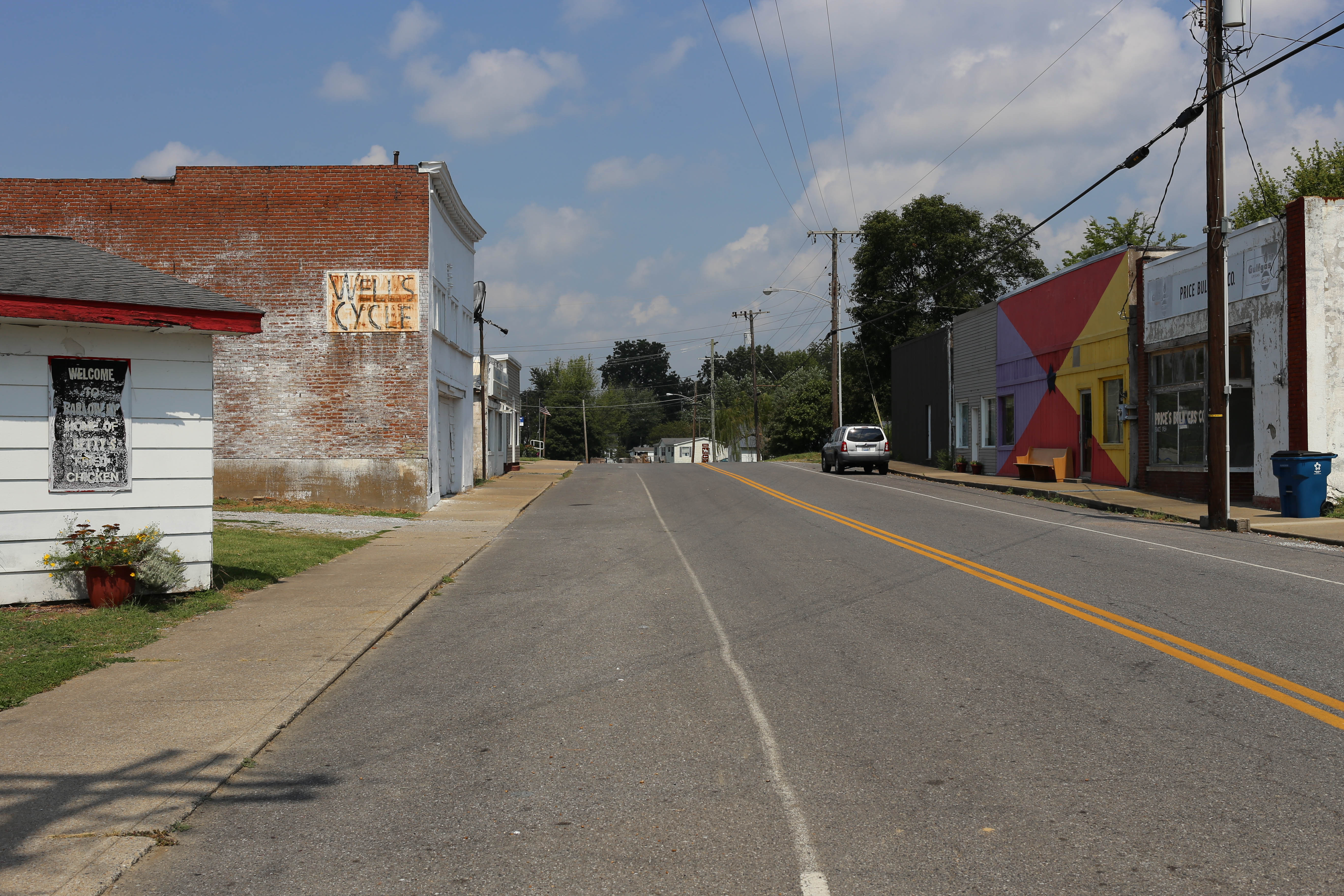
- Barlow, Kentucky in 2017

- Location of Barlow in Ballard County, Kentucky.
- Coordinates: 37°3′7″N 89°2′41″W
- Country: United States
- State: Kentucky
- County: Ballard

Area
  - Total: 0.55 sq mi (1.43 km^{2})
  - Land: 0.55 sq mi (1.43 km^{2})
  - Water: 0 sq mi (0.00 km^{2})
- Elevation: 374 ft (114 m)

Population (2020)
  - Total: 653
  - Density: 1,185.7/sq mi (457.81/km^{2})
- Time zone: UTC-6 (Central (CST))
  - Summer (DST): UTC-5 (CDT)
- ZIP code: 42024
- Area codes: 270 & 364
- FIPS code: 21-03718
- GNIS feature ID: 0486360

Barlow is a home rule-class city in Ballard County, Kentucky, in the United States. The city was formally incorporated by the state assembly in 1872 as Barlow City and later reincorporated in 1903. The population was 653 as of the 2020 census. It is part of the Paducah, KY-IL Metropolitan Statistical Area.

== History ==
The city was named after John Barlow SR, an early settler.

== Geography ==
Barlow is located at 37°3′7″N 89°2′41″W (37.052050, -89.044828).

According to the United States Census Bureau, the city has a total area of 0.5 square miles (1.3 km^{2}), all land.

== Demographics ==
Historical population
Census	Pop.	Note	%±
1910	532		—
1920	654		22.9%
1930	614		−6.1%
1940	584		−4.9%
1950	657		12.5%
1960	731		11.3%
1970	746		2.1%
1980	746		0.0%
1990	706		−5.4%
2000	715		1.3%
2010	675		−5.6%
2020	653		−3.3%
U.S. Decennial Census

As of the census of 2010, there were 675 people, 309 households, and 182 families residing in the city. The population density was 1,350 per square mile (520/km^{2}). There were 356 housing units at an average density of 712 per square mile (275/km^{2}). The racial makeup of the city was 91.9% White, 4.0% African American, 0.1% Asian, 0.4% of other races, and 3.6% from two or more races. Hispanic or Latino of any race were 1.3% of the population.

There were 309 households, out of which 26.9% had children under the age of 18 living with them, 35.6% were married couples living together, 19.1% had a female householder with no husband present, and 41.1% were non-families. 36.6% of all households were made up of individuals living alone, and 17.5% had someone living alone who was 65 years of age or older. The average household size was 2.18 and the average family size was 2.82.

The age distribution of the city was 23.9% under the age of 18, 5.8% from 20 to 24, 22.8% from 25 to 44, 25.8% from 45 to 64, and 18.4% who were 65 years of age or older. The median age was 39.5 years. For every 100 females, there were 86.98 males. For every 100 females age 18 and over, there were 80.35 males.

The median income for a household in the city was $27,798, and the median income for a family was $36,000. Males had a median income of $33,750 versus $22,375 for females. The per capita income for the city was $18,183. About 29.3% of families and 27.3% of the population were below the poverty line, including 34.9% of those under age 18 and 6.8% of those age 65 or over.

== Education ==
There is one school district in the whole county, the Ballard County School District. The district's schools are Ballard County Preschool - Headstart, Ballard County Elementary School, Ballard County Middle School, and Ballard Memorial High School.

== Notable people ==
Earl Grace - (1907–1980) was a professional baseball player and coach known most for his time in Pittsburgh.

== See also ==
- Twin Mounds Site
