= Ballard Memorial High School =

Location
- 3561 Paducah Road; Barlow, Kentucky 42024; United States; 37.06785°N 88.98761°W

Information
- Type: Public
- School district: Ballard County Schools
- Superintendent: Casey Allen
- Principal: Jacob Bishop
- Teaching staff: 21.00 (FTE)
- Grades: 9 to 12
- Enrollment: 265 (2023–2024)
- Student to teacher ratio: 12.62
- Campus: Rural
- Colors: Kelly green and white
- Athletics: 15 varsity teams
- Athletics conference: KHSAA
- Nickname: Bombers and Lady Bombers
- Website: www.ballard.kyschools.us/ballardmemorialhighschool_home.aspx

Ballard Memorial High School is a high school located in unincorporated Ballard County, Kentucky, United States, although its mailing address is in Barlow. The school serves grades 9 through 12.
