= Trimble House =

Trimble House may refer to:

- Trimble House (Lonoke, Arkansas), listed on the National Register of Historic Places in Lonoke County, Arkansas
- Trimble-McCrary House, Lonoke, AR, listed on the NRHP in Arkansas
- Trimble–Parker Historic Farmstead District, Bloomfield, IA, listed on the NRHP in Iowa
- Trimble House (Wickliffe, Kentucky), listed on the National Register of Historic Places in Ballard County, Kentucky
- George Trimble House (Colonie, New York), listed on the NRHP in New York
- James S. Trimble House, Mount Gilead, OH, listed on the NRHP in Ohio
- George Trimble House (Mechanicsburg, Pennsylvania), listed on the NRHP in Pennsylvania

== See also ==
- George Trimble House (disambiguation)
