= Fletcher House =

Fletcher House may refer to:

== In New Zealand ==
- Fletcher House (Otago Peninsula), Broad Bay, Otago Peninsula, listed on the NZHPT register as a category II historic place

== In the United Kingdom ==
- Fletcher House (Shrewsbury), a historic office complex in Shrewsbury, formerly a printing works

== In the United States ==
=== Northeast/Atlantic seaboard ===
- Terry Homestead, Bristol, CT, also known as Fletcher Terry House
- Jonathan Fletcher House, Medford, Massachusetts, listed on the NRHP in Middlesex County, Massachusetts
- Henry Fletcher House, Westford, MA, listed on the NRHP in Middlesex County, Massachusetts
- Pagan-Fletcher House, Valley Stream, NY, listed on the NRHP in Nassau County, New York
- Paris and Anna Fletcher House, Bridport, VT, listed on the NRHP in Addison County, Vermont
- Fletcher-Fullerton Farm, Woodstock, VT, listed on the NRHP in Windsor County, Vermont

=== South ===
- Fletcher House (Little Rock, Arkansas), listed on the NRHP in Pulaski County
- Pike-Fletcher-Terry House, Little Rock, AR, listed on the NRHP in Pulaski County, Arkansas
- W.P. Fletcher House, Lonoke, AR, listed on the NRHP in Lonoke County, Arkansas
- John T. Fletcher House, Columbus, GA, listed on the NRHP in Muscogee County, Georgia
- Kennesaw House in Marietta, Georgia, formerly the Fletcher House hotel during the American Civil War
- Fletcher-Skinner-Nixon House and Outbuildings, Hertford, NC, listed on the NRHP in Perquimans County, North Carolina

=== Midwest ===
- Ruffin Drew Fletcher House, Streator, IL, listed on the NRHP in LaSalle County, Illinois
- Calvin I. Fletcher House, Indianapolis, IN, listed on the NRHP in Marion County, Indiana
- Thomas C. Fletcher House, Hillsboro, MO, listed on the NRHP in Jefferson County, Missouri

=== West ===
- P.W. Fletcher House, Tucson, Arizona, listed on the National Register of Historic Places (NRHP) in Pima County, Arizona
- Fletcher-Stretch House, Dayton, OR, listed on the NRHP in Yamhill County, Oregon
- Francis Fletcher House, Dayton, OR, listed on the NRHP in Yamhill County, Oregon
- Alfred P. Fletcher Farmhouse, Lafayette, OR, listed on the NRHP in Yamhill County, Oregon
