= Shull House =

Historic house in Arkansas, United States

- U.S. National Register of Historic Places
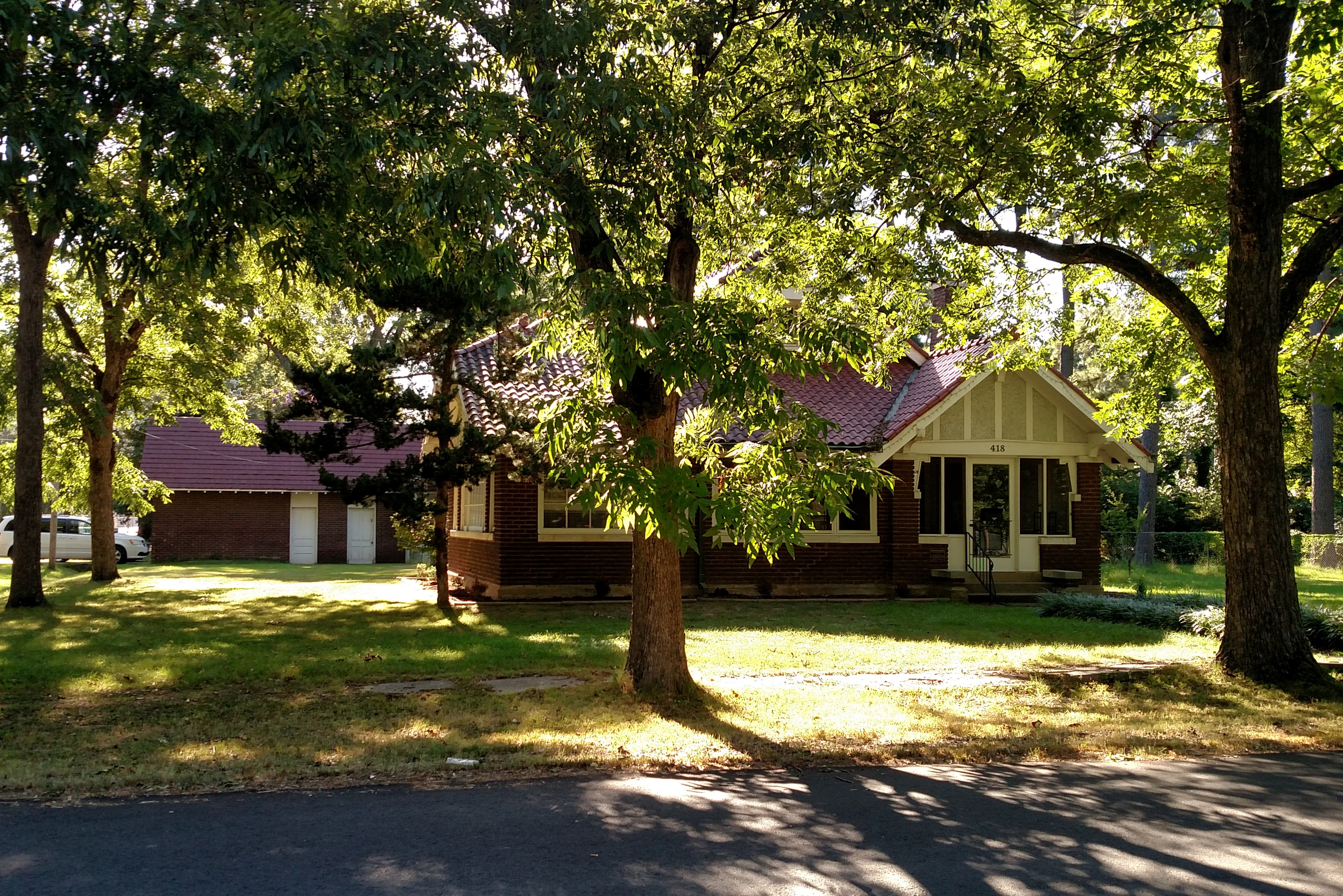

- Location within Arkansas Location within the United States
- Location: 418 Park, Lonoke, Arkansas
- Coordinates: 34°46′48″N 91°54′5″W
- Area: less than one acre
- Built: 1917
- Architect: Thompson and Harding
- Architectural style: Bungalow/American Craftsman
- MPS: Thompson, Charles L., Design Collection TR
- NRHP reference No.: 82000859
- Added to NRHP: December 22, 1982

The Shull House is a historic house at 418 Park Avenue in Lonoke, Arkansas. It is a large 1 1/2-story building, its exterior clad in a combination of half-timbered stucco and brick. The roof is tiled, with clipped gables and eaves that show exposed rafter ends in the American Craftsman style. Windows are typically multipane casement windows in groups. The house was built in 1918 to a design by Thompson and Harding.

The house was listed on the National Register of Historic Places in 1982.

== See also ==
- National Register of Historic Places listings in Lonoke County, Arkansas
