= First Christian Church (Lonoke, Arkansas) =

Historic church in Arkansas, United States

- U.S. National Register of Historic Places
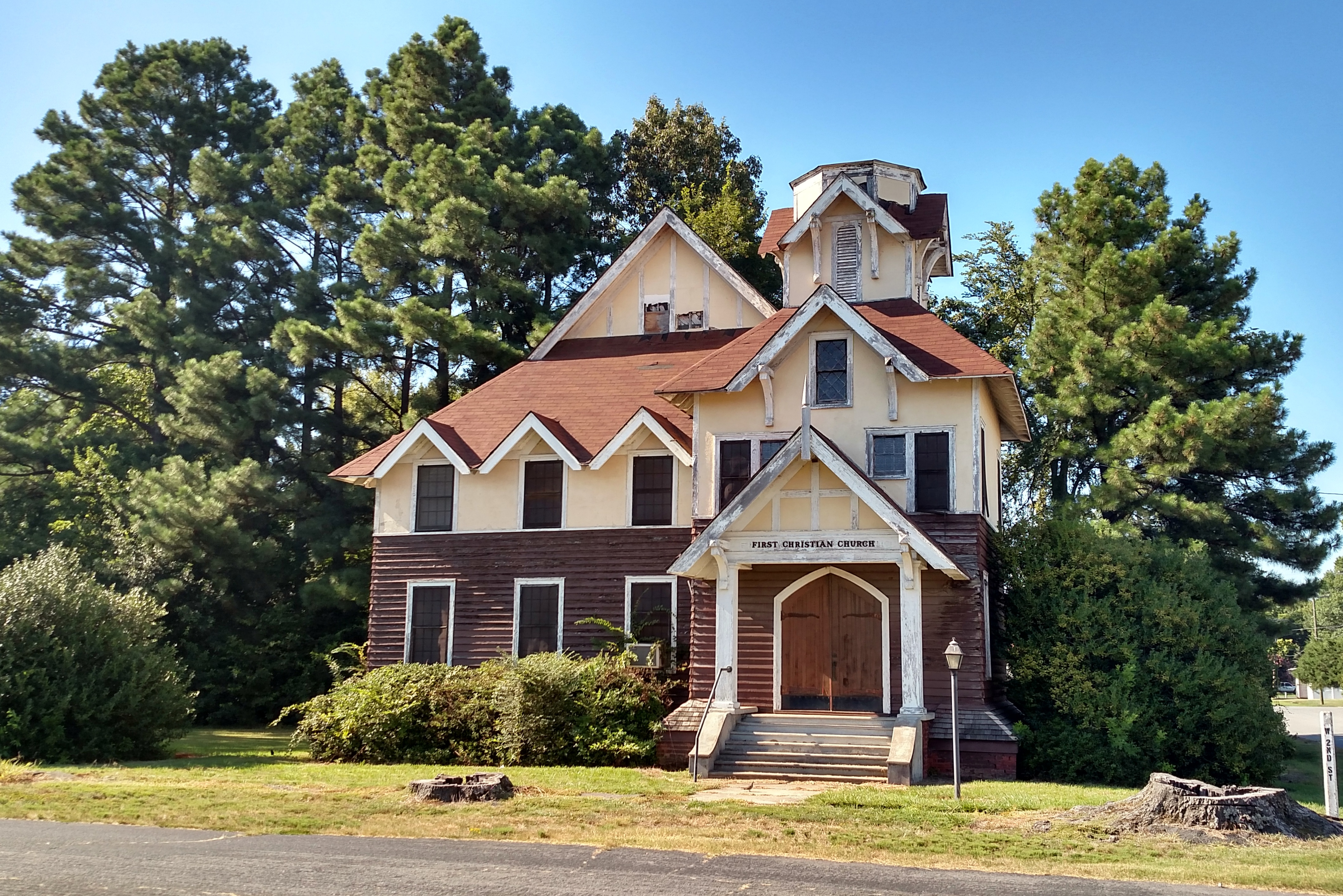

- Location within Arkansas Location within the United States
- Location: Second and Depot Street; Lonoke, Arkansas
- Coordinates: 34°47′7″N 91°54′4″W
- Area: less than one acre
- Built: 1916
- Built by: Charles E. Hamm and Frank Goodbar Sr.
- Architectural style: Bungalow/craftsman, Tudor Revival
- NRHP reference No.: 97000748
- Added to NRHP: July 9, 1997

The First Christian Church is a historic church at the northwest corner of 2nd and Depot Streets in Lonoke, Arkansas. It is a two-story wood-frame structure, built on a residential scale with Tudor Revival styling. Its first floor is clad in weatherboard, while its upper levels are clad in stucco with some half-timbering details. It has a complex hipped roof line, its eaves lined with exposed rafters and brackets in the Craftsman style. The church was built in 1916 for a congregation organized in 1898; it was its first permanent home. The building was listed on the National Register of Historic Places in 1997.

== See also ==
- National Register of Historic Places listings in Lonoke County, Arkansas
