= Eagle House (Lonoke, Arkansas) =

Historic house in Arkansas, United States

- U.S. National Register of Historic Places
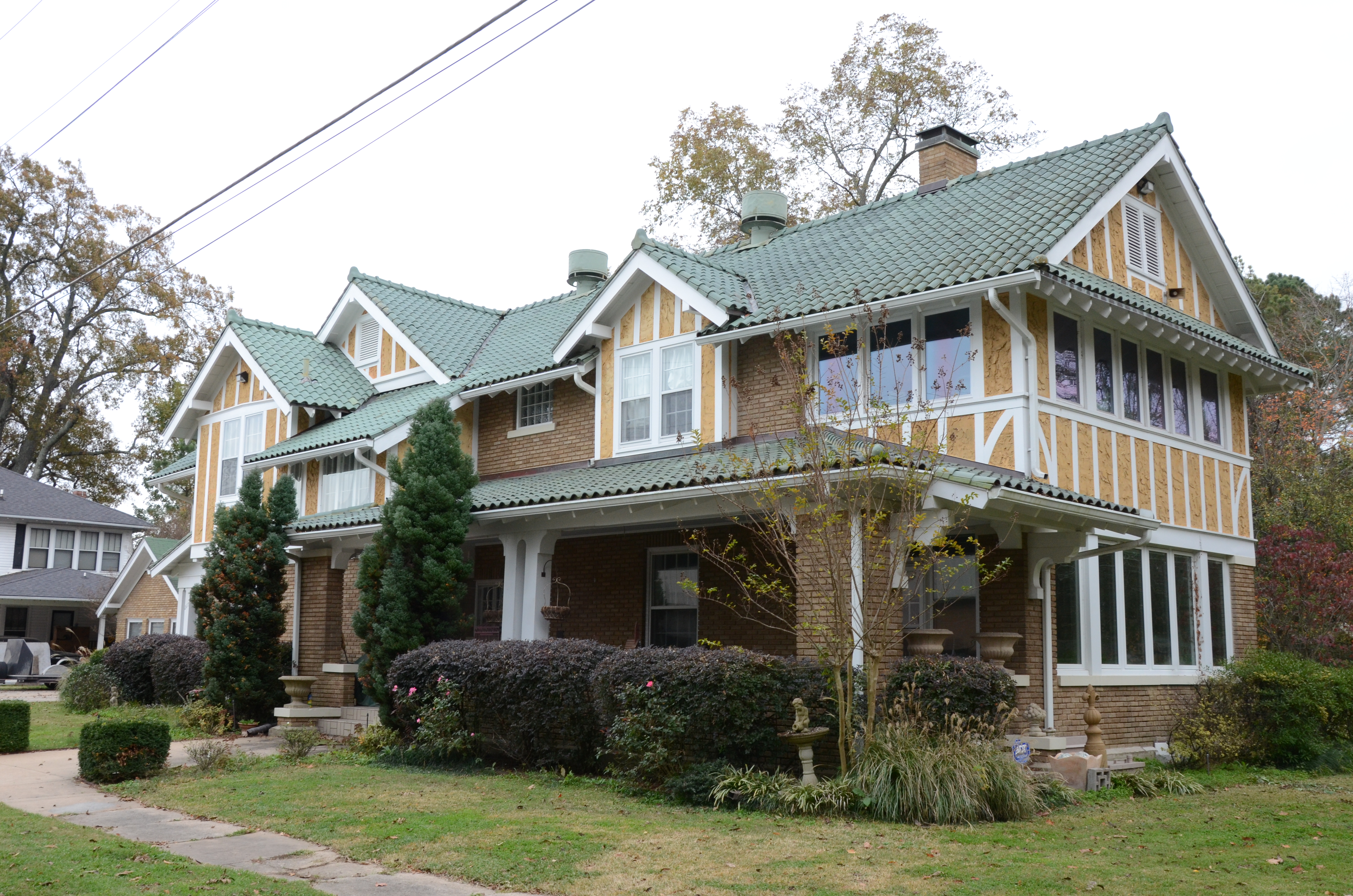

- Location within Arkansas Location within the United States
- Location: 217 Ash St., Lonoke, Arkansas
- Coordinates: 34°46′57″N 91°54′6″W
- Area: less than one acre
- Built: 1915
- Architect: Charles L. Thompson
- Architectural style: Bungalow/Craftsman
- MPS: Thompson, Charles L., Design Collection TR
- NRHP reference No.: 82000858
- Added to NRHP: December 22, 1982

The Eagle House is a historic house at 217 Ash Street in Lonoke, Arkansas. It is a large two story Bungalow/Craftsman style house, with a cross-gable roof configuration, and an exterior of yellow brick and half-timbered stucco. A long single-story porch extends across the front, supported by brick piers and large curved brackets. The house was designed by architect Charles L. Thompson and built in 1915.

The house was listed on the National Register of Historic Places in 1982.

== See also ==
- National Register of Historic Places listings in Lonoke County, Arkansas
