= Lonoke station =

Historic railroad station in Lonoke, Alaska, U.S.

Lonoke
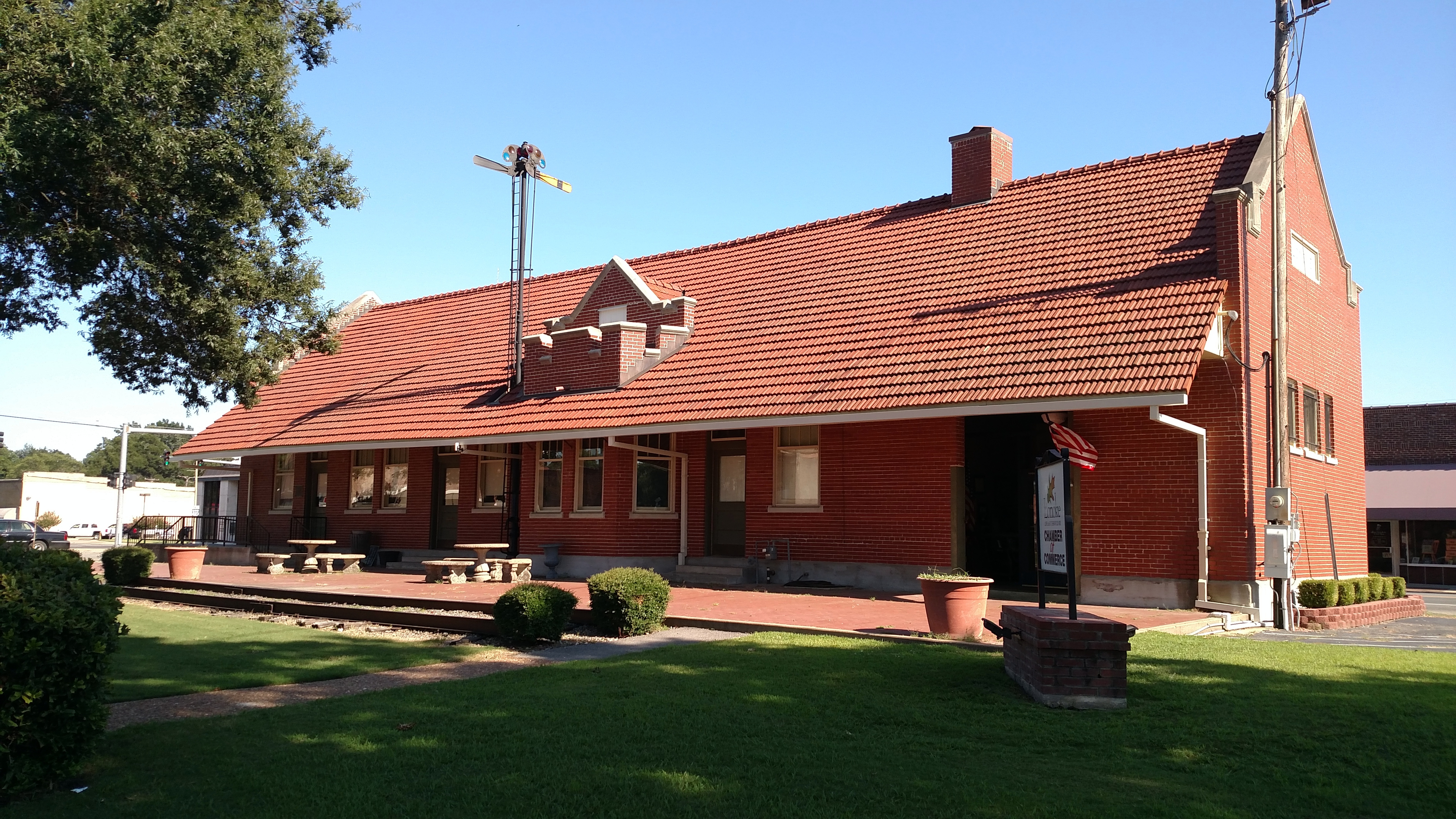

General information
- Location: 109 Front Street ( US 70), Lonoke, Arkansas 72086
- System: Former Rock Island Line passenger rail station

History
- Rebuilt: 1912

Services
Preceding station	Chicago, Rock Island and Pacific Railroad	Following station
Galloway toward Tucumcari	Tucumcari – Memphis	Carlisle toward Memphis
- Rock Island Depot
- U.S. National Register of Historic Places
- U.S. Historic district – Contributing property
- Location within Arkansas Location within the United States
- Location: U.S. 70 and Center St., Lonoke, Arkansas
- Coordinates: 34°47′2″N 91°54′2″W
- Area: less than one acre
- Built: 1912
- Architectural style: Tudor Revival, Jacobethan Revival
- Part of: Lonoke Downtown Historic District (ID96000528)
- NRHP reference No.: 84000006

Significant dates
- Added to NRHP: October 4, 1984
- Designated CP: May 10, 1996
Location

The former Rock Island Depot is a historic railroad station at the junction of Front and Center Streets in downtown Lonoke, Arkansas. It is a long, rectangular brick building, topped by a steeply pitched gabled tile roof. Its gable ends are partially stepped and raised above the roof pitch in the Jacobethan style. It stands south of the area where the Rock Island Line railroad tracks ran, and has a three-sided telegrapher's booth projecting from its north side. It was built in 1912, and served as a passenger and freight station for many years, and now houses the local chamber of commerce.

The building was listed on the National Register of Historic Places in 1984.

== See also ==
- National Register of Historic Places listings in Lonoke County, Arkansas
