= George Trimble House =

George Trimble House may refer to:

- George Trimble House (Colonie, New York), listed on the NRHP in New York
- George Trimble House (Mechanicsburg, Pennsylvania), listed on the NRHP in Pennsylvania

== See also ==
- Trimble House (disambiguation)
