= Carver Gymnasium =

- U.S. National Register of Historic Places
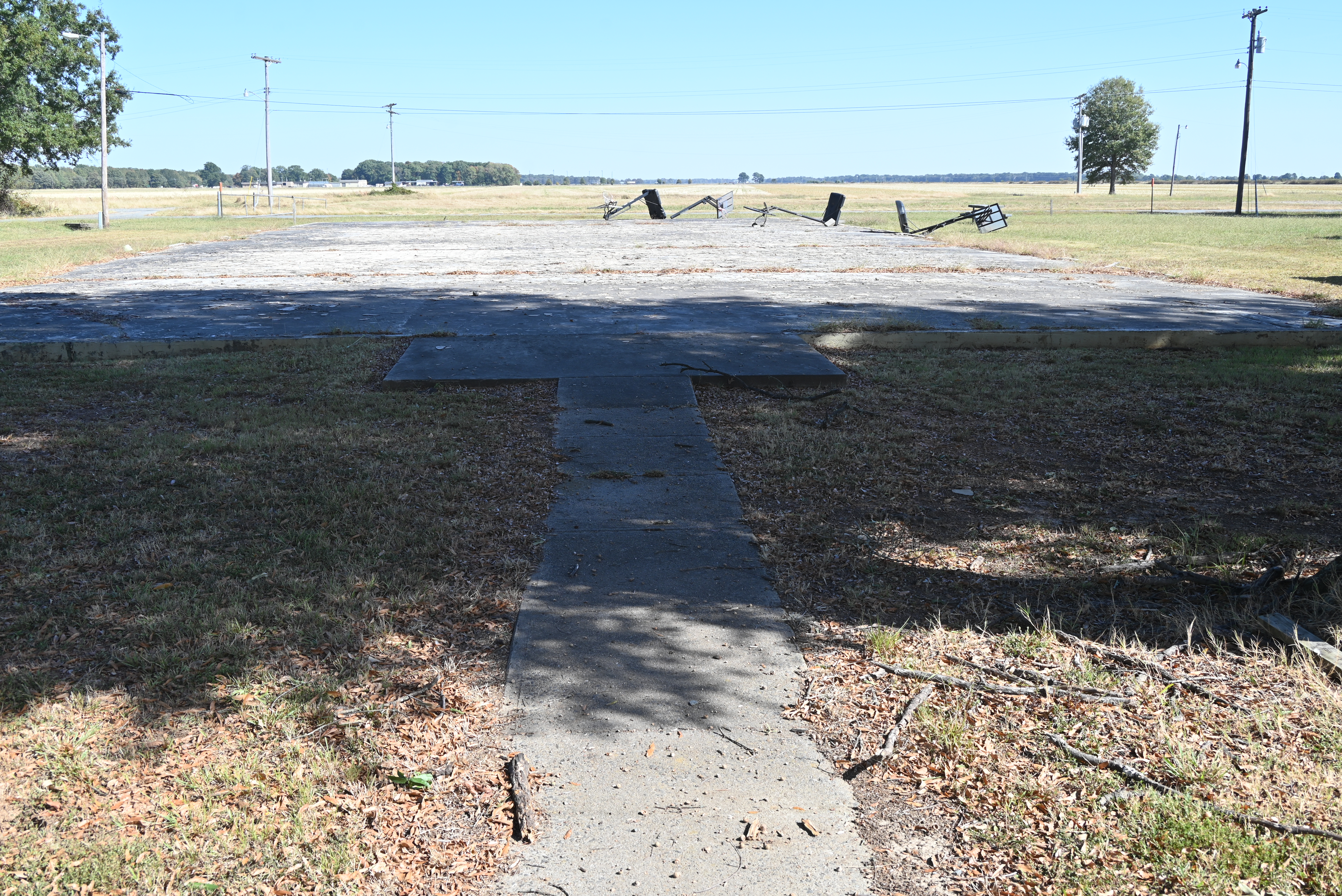
- The buildings foundation in 2022

- Location within Arkansas Location within the United States
- Location: 400 Ferguson St. Lonoke, Arkansas
- Coordinates: 34°46′57″N 91°53′46″W
- Area: less than one acre
- Built: 1957
- Architectural style: one story gable end
- NRHP reference No.: 09000741
- Added to NRHP: September 23, 2009

The Carver Gymnasium is a historic school building at 400 Ferguson Street in Lonoke, Arkansas.

== Description and history ==
The Carver Gymnasium is a vernacular single-story structure, built out of concrete blocks and capped by a gabled metal roof. The gable ends are clad in metal siding, and there are irregularly spaced awning windows on the walls. It was built in 1957 for the Carver School, the segregated facility serving Lonoke's African-American students, and is its last surviving building. After the city's schools were integrated in 1970, the school complex served as its junior high school, and was vacated by the school system in 2005.

The building was listed on the National Register of Historic Places in 2009.

== See also ==
- National Register of Historic Places listings in Lonoke County, Arkansas
