= Thomas Sloan Boyd House =

Historic house in Arkansas, United States

- U.S. National Register of Historic Places
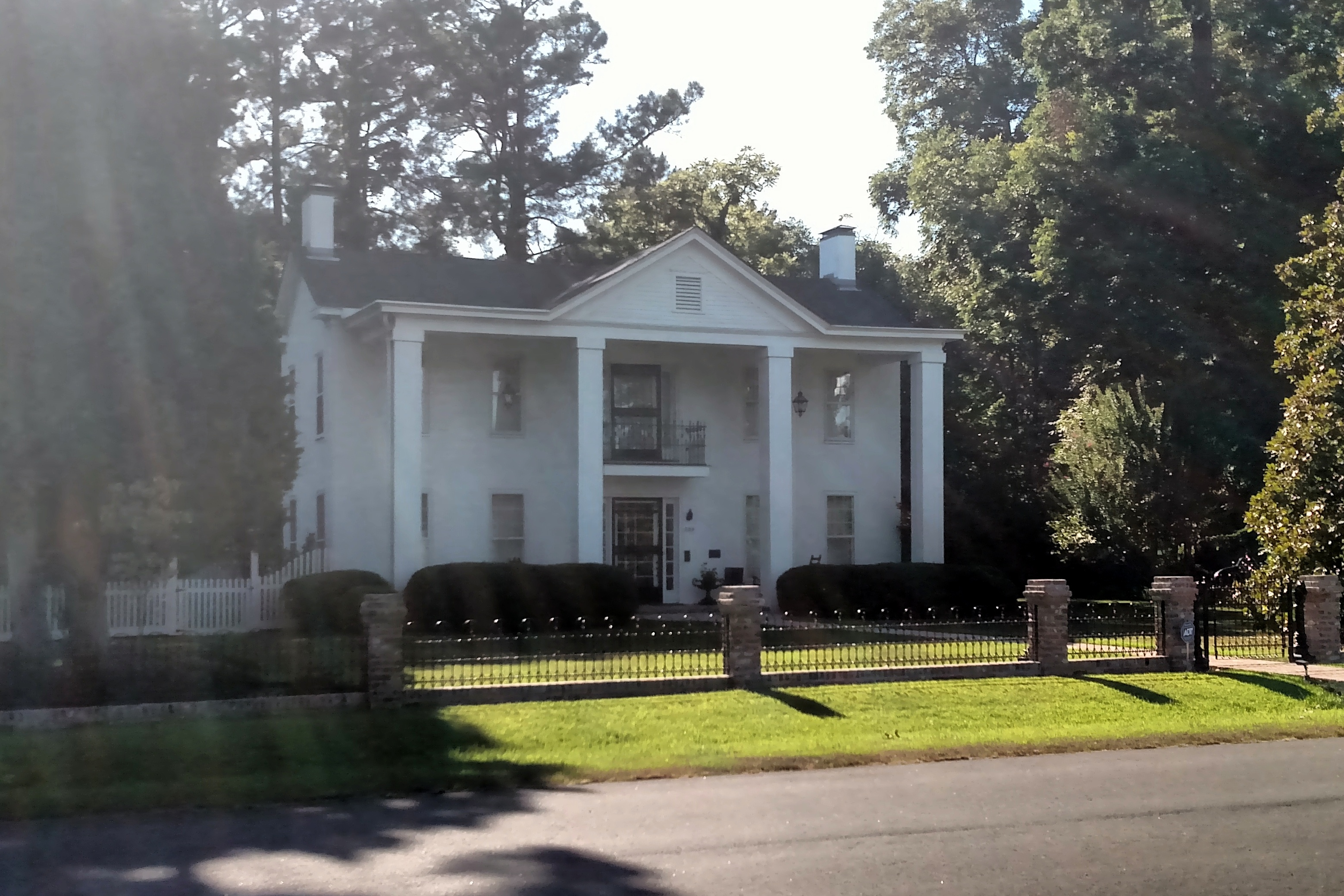

- Location within Arkansas Location within the United States
- Location: 220 Park Avenue, Lonoke, Arkansas
- Coordinates: 34°46′55″N 91°54′7″W
- Area: less than one acre
- Built: c. 1873
- Architect: T. S. Boyd
- NRHP reference No.: 76000430
- Added to NRHP: January 1, 1976

The Thomas Sloan Boyd House (also known as the Boyd-Barton House) is a historic house located at 220 Park Avenue in Lonoke, Arkansas.

== Description ==
The Thomas Sloan Boyd House is a T-shaped, two-story brick structure, built out of locally made bricks in about 1873 by Thomas Sloan Boyd, a local farmer. Most of the interior woodwork was cut from trees found on the property. A full-height porch extends across the facade, supported by square brick columns, added in 1913. It is the oldest brick building in the city. The brick has been painted white since 1936 to help with preservation. Outbuildings, including the well house, barn, and a small cabin original to when the Boyd family owned the property, have been removed.

== History ==
Thomas Sloan Boyd, originally from North Carolina, personally supervised and participated in building the home. It was the first brick building to be built in the railroad community. Boyd volunteered for service with the Confederate Army in 1863, with his friend James Philip Eagle who became the 16th Governor of Arkansas. They served in Company D, Second Regiment, Arkansas Mounted Rifles. Boyd married Mattie Eagle, the younger sister of his friend after the death of his first wife died in 1867. Together they bought the plot of land the Thomas Sloan Boyd House would eventually be built on in 1869. The family finally moved into the home in late 1874 or early 1875.

The only time the home ever had a mortgage leveraged against it was in 1879, when several families in the community did the same to raise money for the communities first public school.

The house was listed on the National Register of Historic Places on January 1, 1976.

== See also ==
- National Register of Historic Places listings in Lonoke County, Arkansas
