= Walls House (Lonoke, Arkansas) =

Historic house in Arkansas, United States

- U.S. National Register of Historic Places
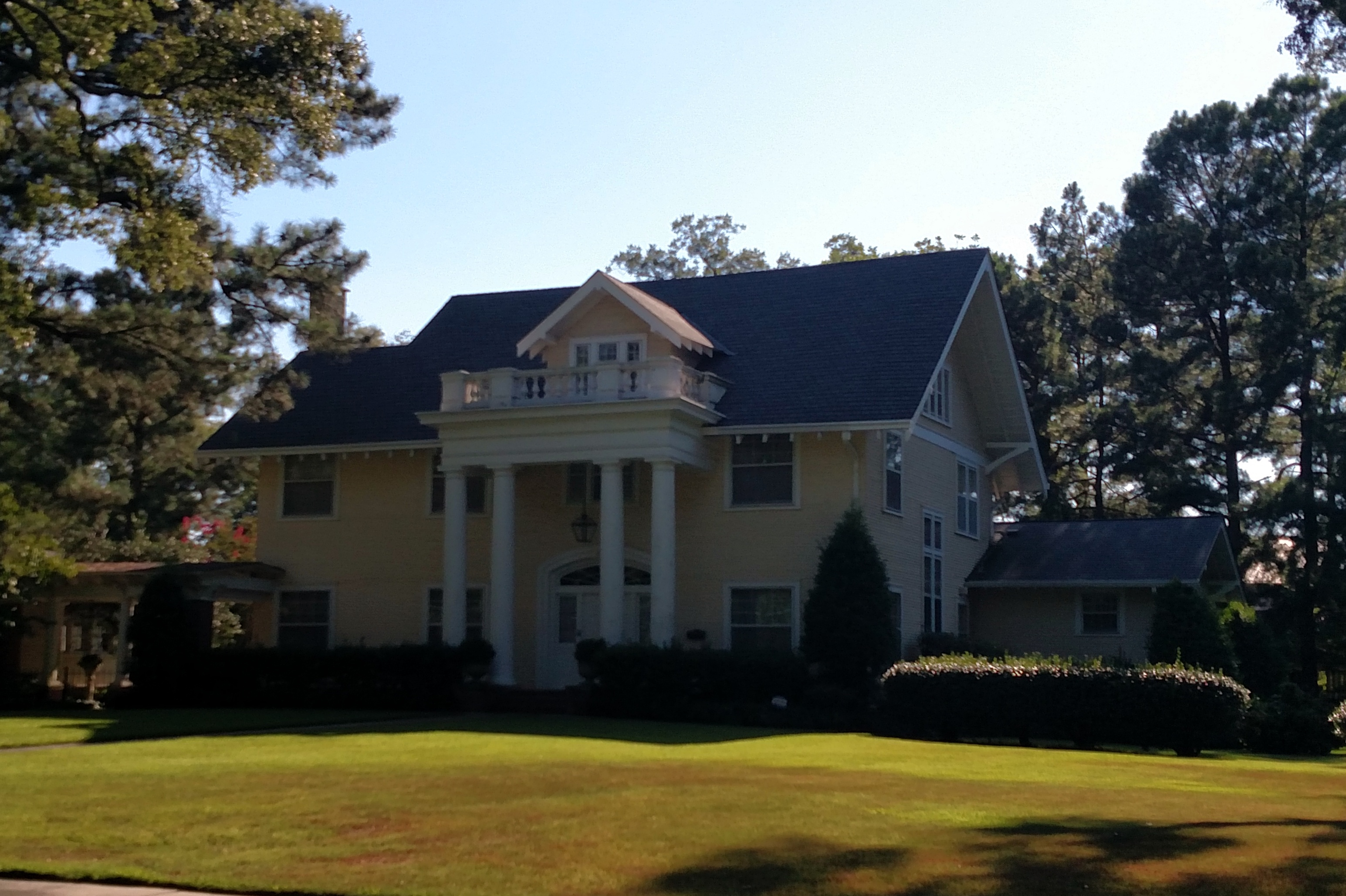

- Location within Arkansas Location within the United States
- Location: 406 Jefferson St., Lonoke, Arkansas
- Coordinates: 34°46′49″N 91°54′12″W
- Built: 1913
- Architect: Charles L. Thompson
- Architectural style: Colonial Revival, Bungalow/Craftsman
- MPS: Thompson, Charles L., Design Collection TR
- NRHP reference No.: 82000861
- Added to NRHP: December 22, 1982

The Walls House, known also as the McCrary House, is a historic house at 406 Jefferson Street in Lonoke, Arkansas. It is a 2 1/2-story wood-frame structure, with a side-gable roof and weatherboard siding. Its Colonial Revival styling includes a projecting front portico, with paired Tuscan columns supporting an entablature and balustraded balcony, above which rises a large gabled dormer with exposed rafter ends. The house was built in 1913 to a design by Charles L. Thompson.

The house was listed on the National Register of Historic Places in 1982.

== See also ==
- National Register of Historic Places listings in Lonoke County, Arkansas
