= Morris House (Lonoke, Arkansas) =

Historic house in Arkansas, United States

- U.S. National Register of Historic Places
- Location within Arkansas Location within the United States
- Location: 16428 AR 89, Lonoke, Arkansas
- Coordinates: 34°47′36″N 91°54′55″W
- Area: 4 acres (1.6 ha)
- Built: 1963
- Architect: Fred Perkins
- Architectural style: Mid-Century Modern
- NRHP reference No.: 100004000
- Added to NRHP: May 30, 2019

The Morris House is a historic house at 16428 Arkansas Highway 89 in Lonoke, Arkansas. It is a large single-story structure, measuring about 150 feet (46 m) in length and 50 feet (15 m) in width, set on lot about 4 acres (1.6 ha) in size. Its walls are finished in brick and vertical board siding, and it is covered by a gable-on-hip roof which has a clerestory window near the center where the chimney is located. The house was designed by architect Fred Perkins in 1962 for the family of William Henry Morris, a prominent local farmer. It was built in 1963 and is a good local example of Mid-Century Modern architecture.

The house was listed on the National Register of Historic Places in 2019.

== See also ==
- National Register of Historic Places listings in Lonoke County, Arkansas
