= Wheat House (Lonoke, Arkansas) =

Historic house in Arkansas, United States

- U.S. National Register of Historic Places
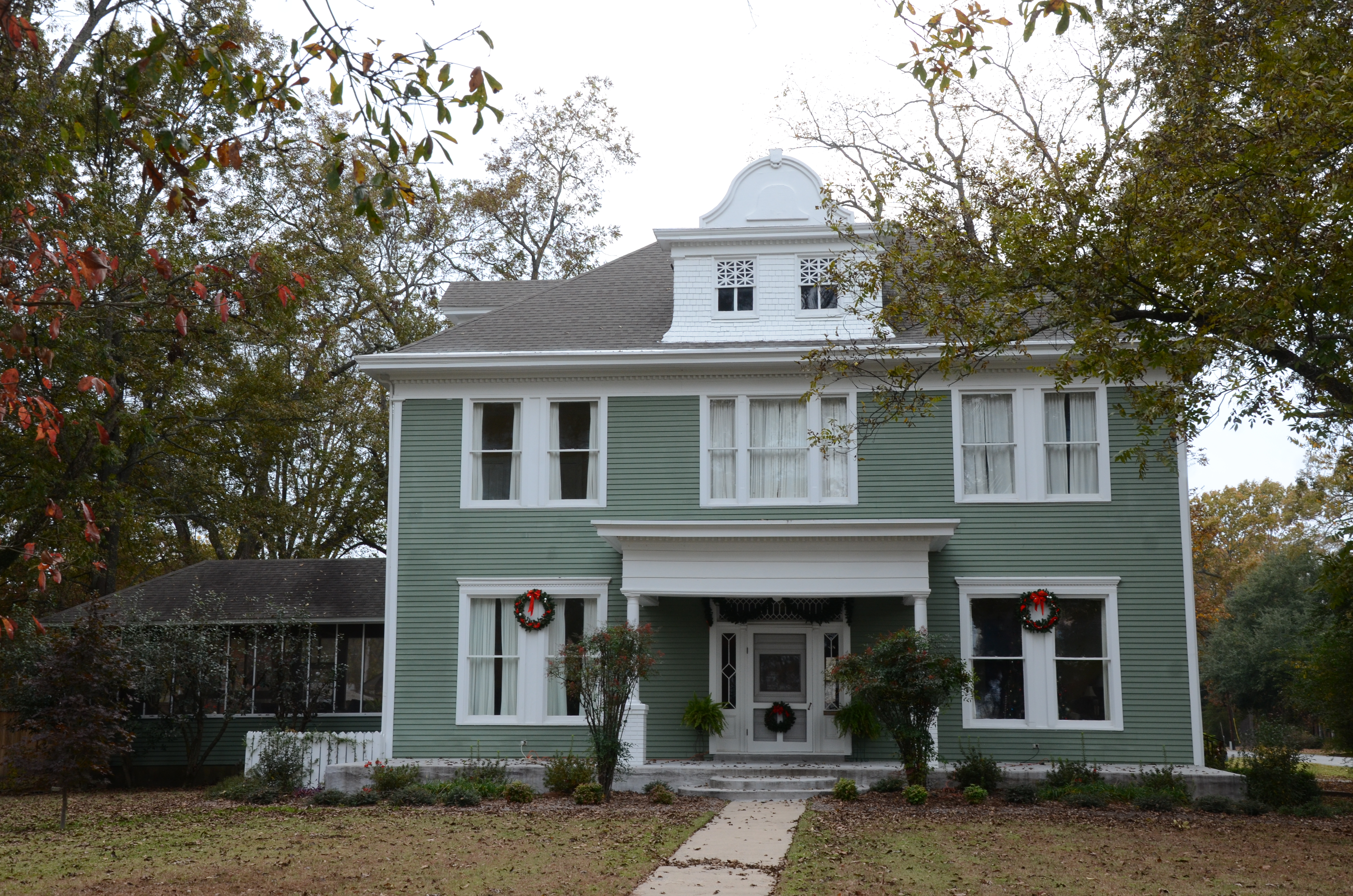

- Location within Arkansas Location within the United States
- Location: 600 Center St., Lonoke, Arkansas
- Coordinates: 34°46′43″N 91°53′59″W
- Area: 0.7 acres (0.28 ha)
- Built: 1900
- Architect: Charles L. Thompson
- Architectural style: Georgian Revival
- MPS: Thompson, Charles L., Design Collection TR
- NRHP reference No.: 82000862
- Added to NRHP: December 22, 1982

The Wheat House is a historic house at 600 Center Street in Lonoke, Arkansas. It is a two-story wood-frame structure, with a hip roof and weatherboard siding. Its massing and relatively modest styling are characteristic of the Georgian Revival, although it has a fairly elaborate entry porch, supported by slender Tuscan columns and pilasters. Dentil moulding is found at the base of the main cornice, and those that top the windows. Built c. 1910 to a design by Charles L. Thompson, it is one of Lonoke's largest and most sophisticated houses.

The house was listed on the National Register of Historic Places in 1982.

== See also ==
- National Register of Historic Places listings in Lonoke County, Arkansas
