= Frederick Perkins =

Frederick Perkins may refer to:

- Frederick Perkins (schoolteacher), Australian schoolteacher and Anglican minister
- Frederick Mason Perkins, American art historian, critic, and collector
- Sir Frederick Perkins (MP), British politician

== See also ==
- Frederic Beecher Perkins, American editor, writer, and librarian
- Fred Perkins, American architect
