= Lonoke Confederate Monument =

- U.S. National Register of Historic Places
- U.S. Historic district – Contributing property
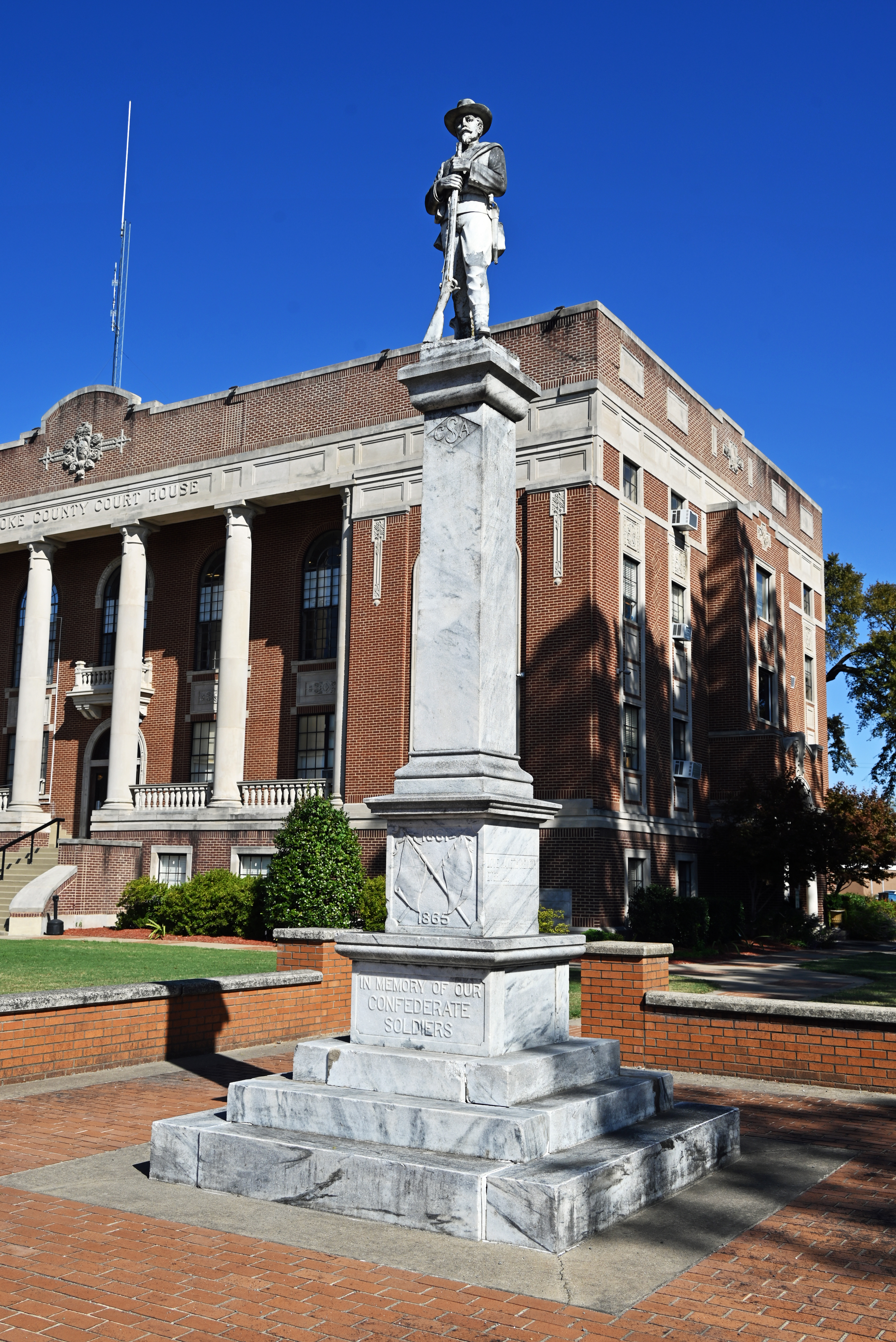

- Location within Arkansas Location within the United States
- Location: Courthouse Lawn, near jct. of 3rd and Center Sts., Lonoke, Arkansas
- Coordinates: 34°47′9″N 91°53′58″W
- Area: less than one acre
- Built: 1910
- Architectural style: Classical Revival
- Part of: Lonoke Downtown Historic District (ID96000528)
- MPS: Civil War Commemorative Sculpture MPS
- NRHP reference No.: 96000508

Significant dates
- Added to NRHP: May 3, 1996
- Designated CP: May 10, 1996

The Lonoke Confederate Monument is located in central downtown Lonoke, Arkansas, on the grounds of the Lonoke County Courthouse. It is a marble depiction of a Confederate Army soldier, 6 feet (1.8 m) in height, mounted on a square columnar base almost 15 feet (4.6 m) tall. The soldier holds a rifle, its butt resting on the ground, and carries a bedroll. He has a belt on which there are a canteen and bayonet. The statue was commissioned by the local chapter of the United Daughters of the Confederacy and was unveiled in 1910.

The monument was listed on the National Register of Historic Places in 1996.

== See also ==
- National Register of Historic Places listings in Lonoke County, Arkansas
