= Joe P. Eagle and D. R. Boone Building =

- U.S. National Register of Historic Places
- U.S. Historic district – Contributing property
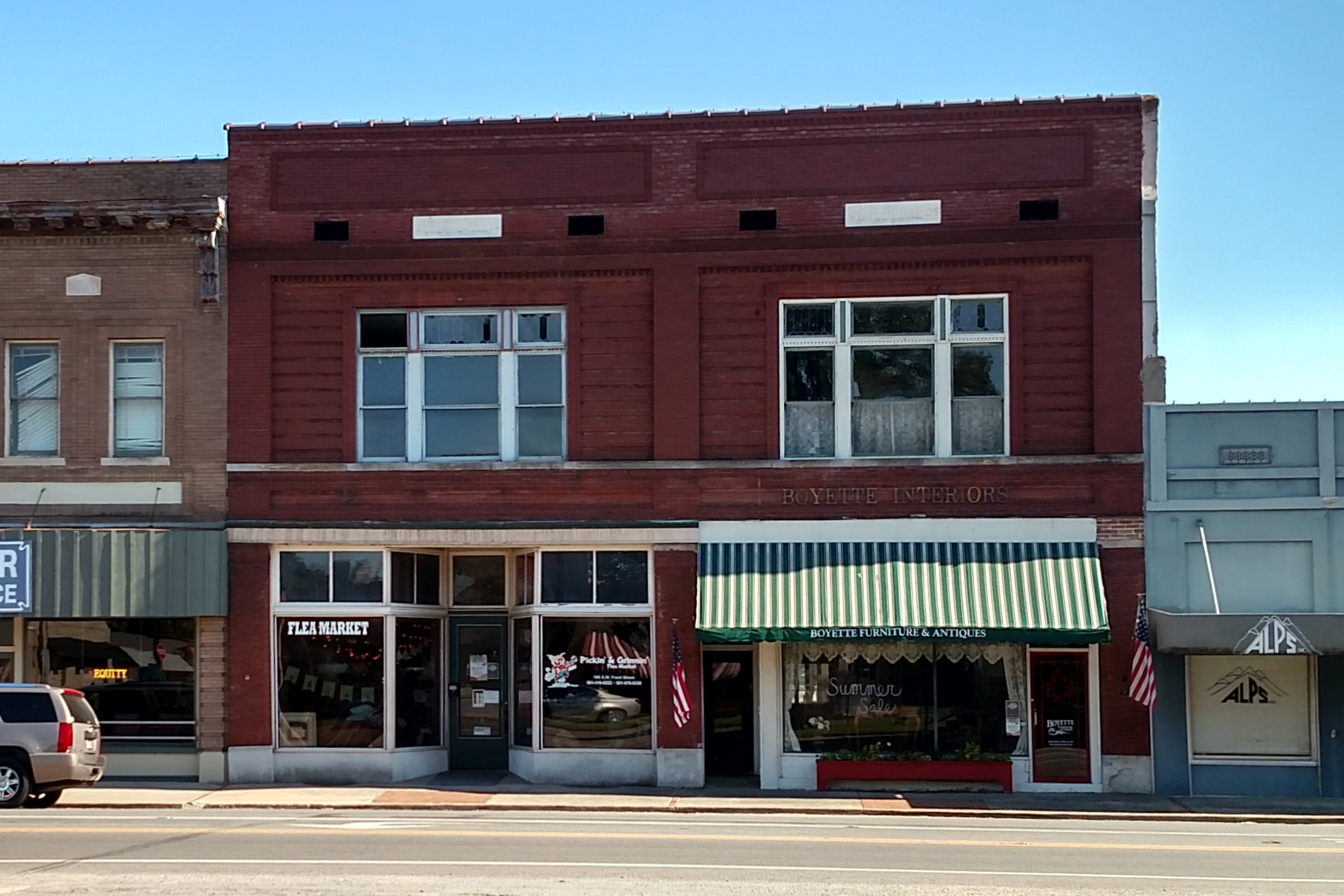

- Location within Arkansas Location within the United States
- Location: 105-107 W. Front St., Lonoke, Arkansas
- Coordinates: 34°47′1″N 91°54′1″W
- Area: less than one acre
- Architect: Charles L. Thompson
- Part of: Lonoke Downtown Historic District (ID96000528)
- MPS: Thompson, Charles L., Design Collection TR
- NRHP reference No.: 94001462

Significant dates
- Added to NRHP: December 9, 1994
- Designated CP: May 10, 1996

The Joe P. Eagle and D. R. Boone Building is a historic commercial building at 105-107 West Front Street in downtown Lonoke, Arkansas. It is a two-story red brick building, with a sloping flat roof obscured by parapet, and a brick foundation. It is divided into two sections, articulated by brick pilasters. The left half has an original storefront on the first floor, with plate glass display windows flanking a recessed entrance, while the right half has a more modern (1960s) appearance, with a central display window, with the store entrance on the right and a building entrance to the upper floor on the left. The second-floor on both halves has tripled sash windows, the center one larger, all topped by transom windows. The building was designed by architect Charles L. Thompson and built in 1905.

The building was listed on the U.S. National Register of Historic Places in 1994.

== See also ==
- National Register of Historic Places listings in Lonoke County, Arkansas
