= Lonoke Downtown Historic District =

Historic district in Arkansas, United States

- U.S. National Register of Historic Places
- U.S. Historic district
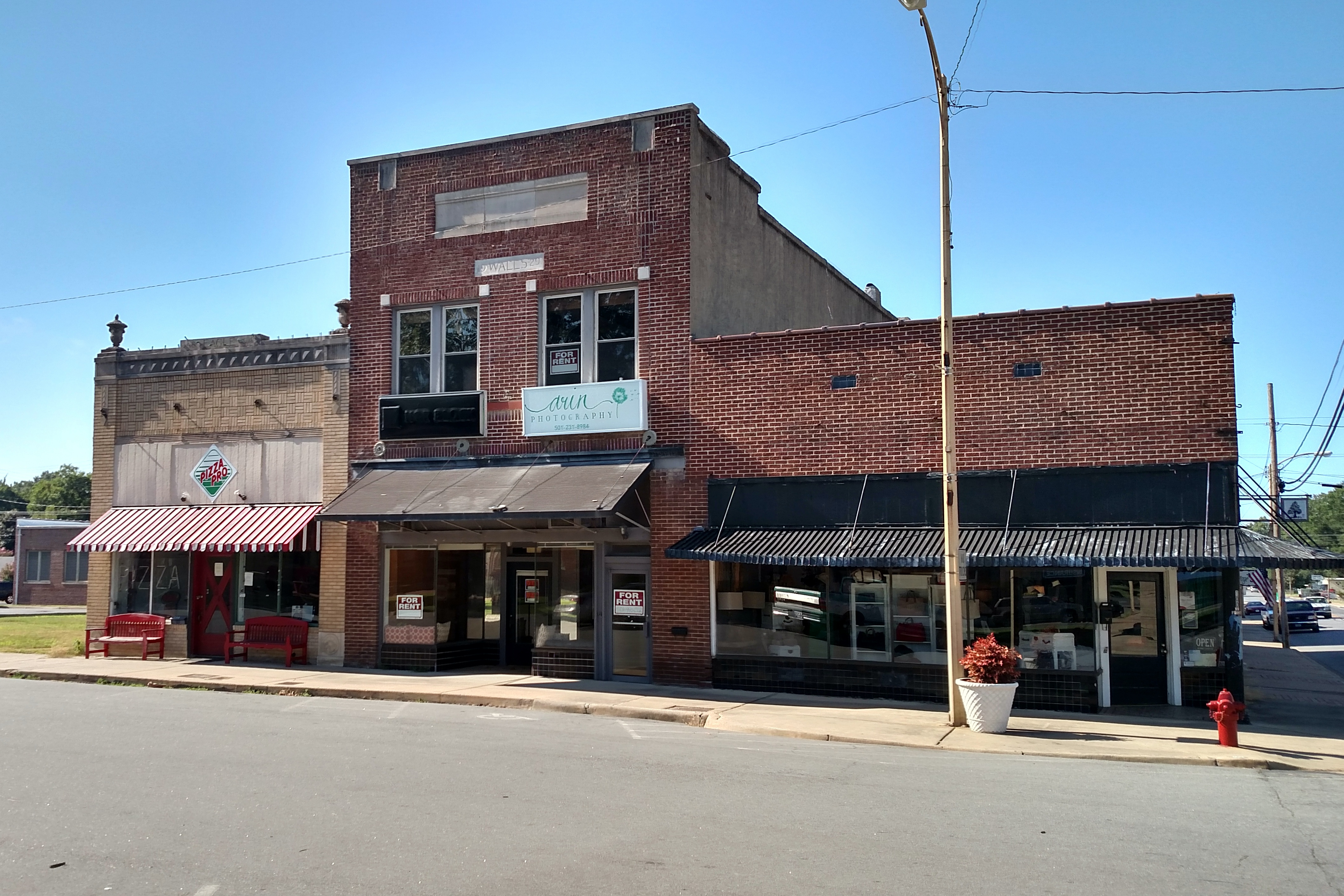

- Location within Arkansas Location within the United States
- Location: Jct. of Front and Center Sts., Lonoke, Arkansas
- Coordinates: 34°47′2″N 91°54′0″W
- Area: 21.5 acres (8.7 ha)
- Built: 1900
- Architectural style: Italianate, Early Commercial, Classical Revival
- NRHP reference No.: 96000528
- Added to NRHP: May 10, 1996

The Lonoke Downtown Historic District encompasses a portion of the central business district of Lonoke, Arkansas. It extends south along Center Street, from the Lonoke County Courthouse to Front Street, and then one block east and west on both sides of Front Street. It extends eastward on the south side of Front Street another 1-1/2 blocks. Lonoke was founded as a railroad community in 1862, and this area represents the core of its downtown area for the period 1900–1945. Most of the district's 23 buildings are commercial structures, one to two stories in height, with brick facades.

The district was listed on the National Register of Historic Places in 1996. Previously listed contributing properties in the district include the Lonoke County Courthouse, the Joe P. Eagle and D. R. Boone Building, the Rock Island Depot, and the Lonoke Confederate Monument.

== See also ==
- National Register of Historic Places listings in Lonoke County, Arkansas
