= Fred Perkins =

American architect

Fred Perkins (July 8, 1938 – ) is an architect based in Little Rock, Arkansas. He has designed about 200 churches.

He is managing partner of Roark Perkins Perry Yelvington Architects

Works include:

- Morris House, Lonoke, Arkansas, Mid-century modern in style.
