= Keo Commercial Historic District =

Historic district in Arkansas, United States

- U.S. National Register of Historic Places
- U.S. Historic district
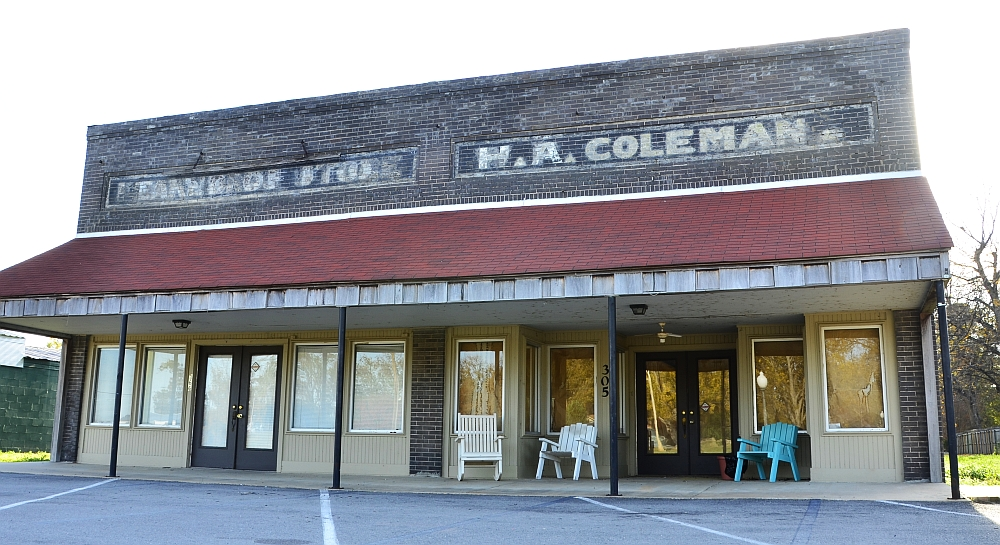

- Location within Arkansas Location within the United States
- Location: Main & Fleming Sts., AR 232, Keo, Arkansas
- Coordinates: 34°36′2″N 92°0′33″W
- Area: 19 acres (7.7 ha)
- Built: 1913
- Architectural style: Early Commercial
- NRHP reference No.: 11000355
- Added to NRHP: June 15, 2011

The Keo Commercial Historic District encompasses a cluster of commercial and industrial buildings that make up the economic center of the small city of Keo, Arkansas. The district includes a two-block section of Main Street, anchored at its southern end by the Cobb Cotton Gin complex, and on the north by Arkansas Highway 232, where it extends a short way in both directions. The community grew around the Cotten Belt Railroad line, which Main Street was laid out just west of. The cotton gin complex has its origins in 1906, as a means for local farmers to process their cotton and send it on to market via the railroad.

The district was listed on the National Register of Historic Places in 2011.

== See also ==
- National Register of Historic Places listings in Lonoke County, Arkansas
