= Dr. E.F. Utley House =

Historic house in Arkansas, United States

- U.S. National Register of Historic Places
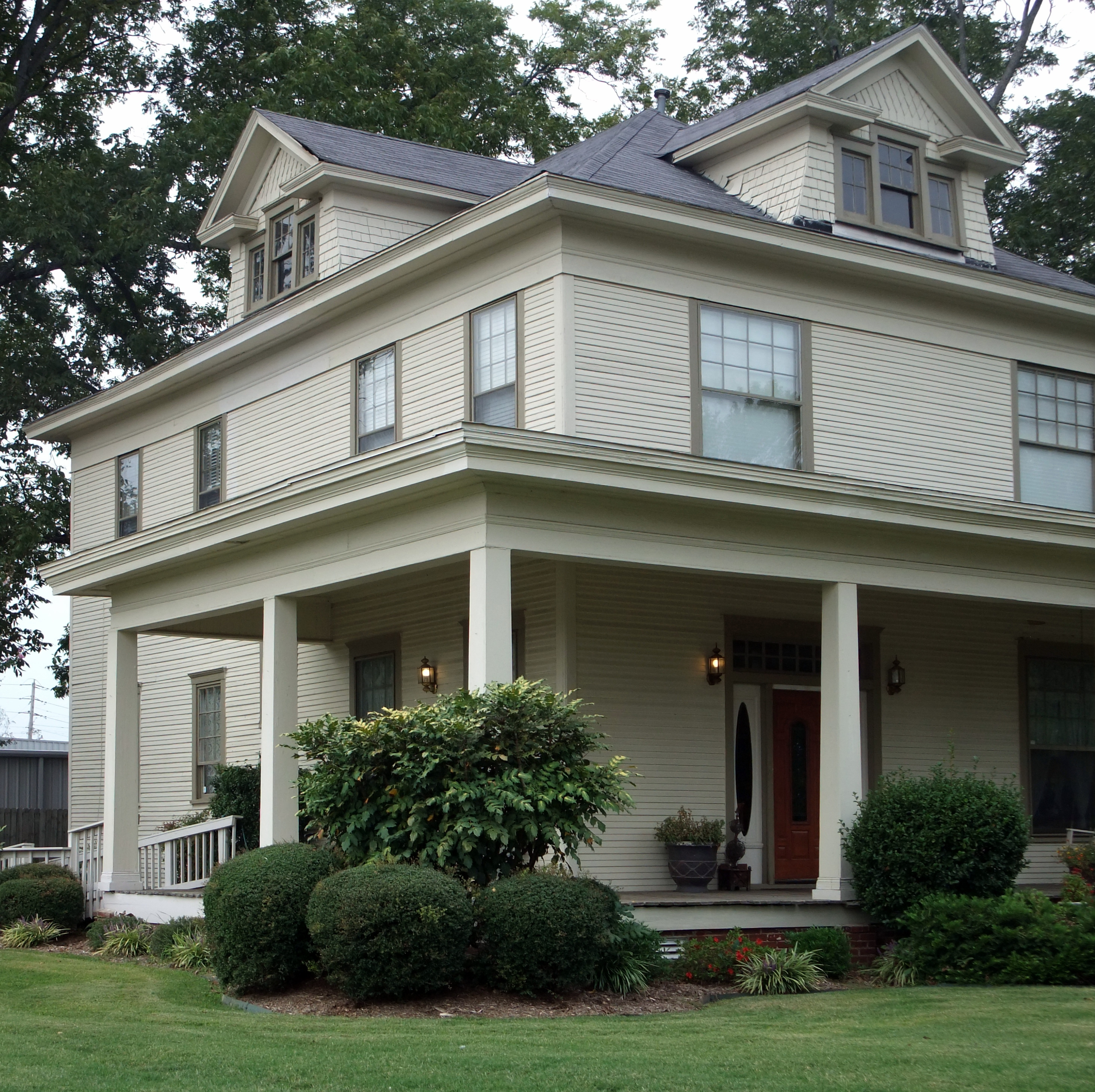

- Location within Arkansas Location within the United States
- Location: 401 W. Pine St., Cabot, Arkansas
- Coordinates: 35°0′43″N 92°1′4″W
- Area: less than one acre
- Built: 1914
- Architectural style: Colonial Revival
- NRHP reference No.: 98000623
- Added to NRHP: June 3, 1998

The Dr. E.F. Utley House is a historic house at 401 West Pine Street in Cabot, Arkansas. It is a 2 1/2-story wood-frame American Foursquare house, with a hip roof, weatherboard siding, and a brick foundation. The roof has gabled dormers that are finished in diamond-cut wooden shingles. A single-story porch extends across the front and wraps around the side, supported by tapered square columns. The house was built sometime between 1914 and 1922, and is Cabot's best example of a Colonial Revival Foursquare.

The house was listed on the National Register of Historic Places in 1998.

== See also ==
- National Register of Historic Places listings in Lonoke County, Arkansas
