= Martindale Corn Crib =

- U.S. National Register of Historic Places
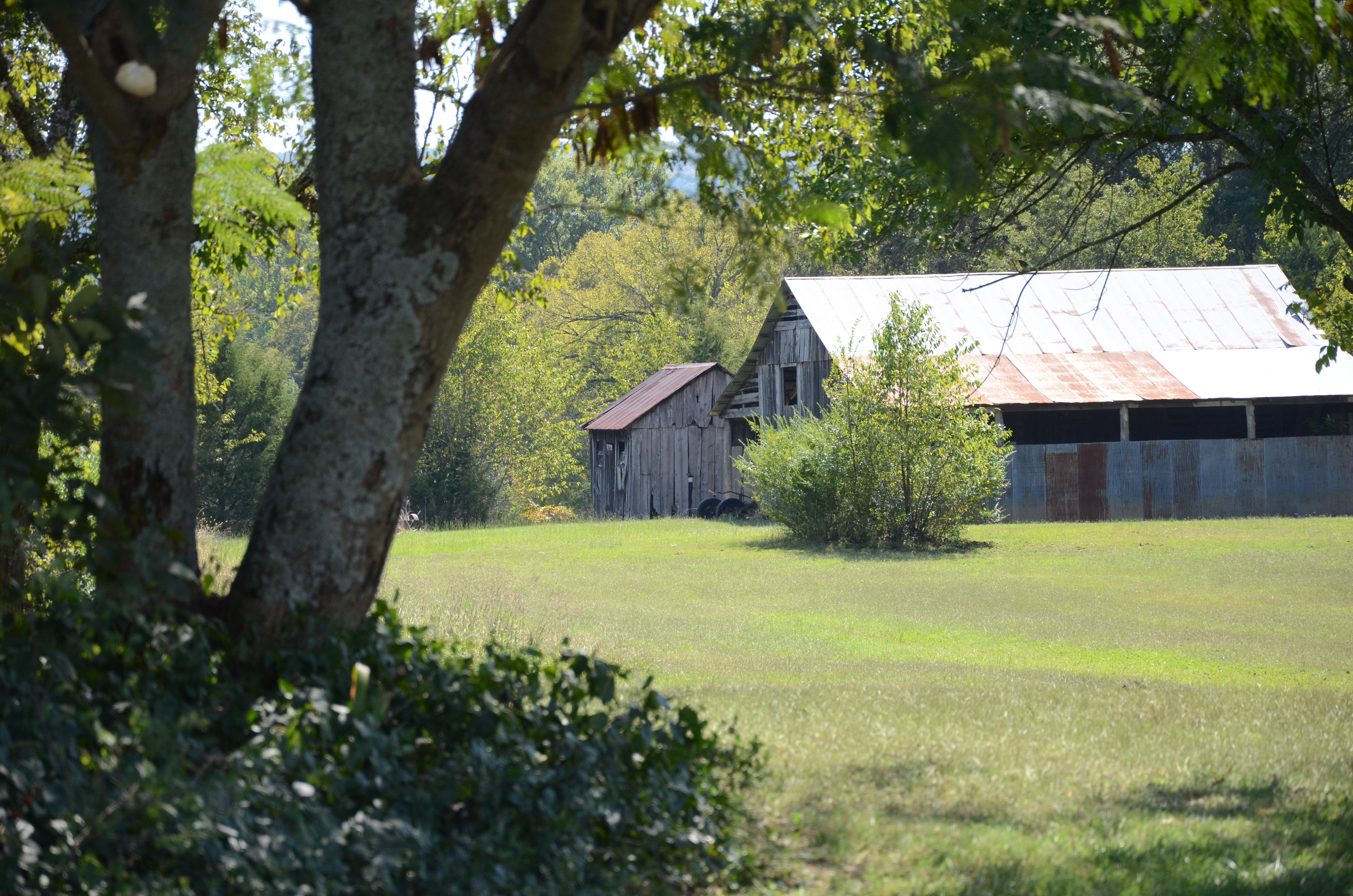
- The corn crib is the small building at the center of this picture, partially obscured by the barn to the right.

- Location within Arkansas Location within the United States
- Location: AR 310, Letona, Arkansas
- Coordinates: 35°21′43″N 91°50′28″W
- Area: less than one acre
- Architectural style: Post-and-nailer corn crib
- MPS: White County MPS
- NRHP reference No.: 91001330
- Added to NRHP: July 20, 1992

The Martindale Corn Crib is a historic farm outbuilding in rural northern White County, Arkansas. It is located west of Letona, in a field near a barn on the south side of Arkansas Highway 310. The corn crib is a small single-story wooden structure, built out of plank framing on a stone pier foundation, with a gabled metal roof on top. Built in 1924, it is a rare surviving example of post-and-nailer construction, in which the wall studs are stabilized by a horizontal member halfway up their length.

The building was listed on the National Register of Historic Places in 1992.

== See also ==
- Walls Farm Barn and Corn Crib: NRHP-listed in Lonoke County, Arkansas
- National Register of Historic Places listings in White County, Arkansas
