= Casey Martin (baseball) =

American baseball player (born 1999)

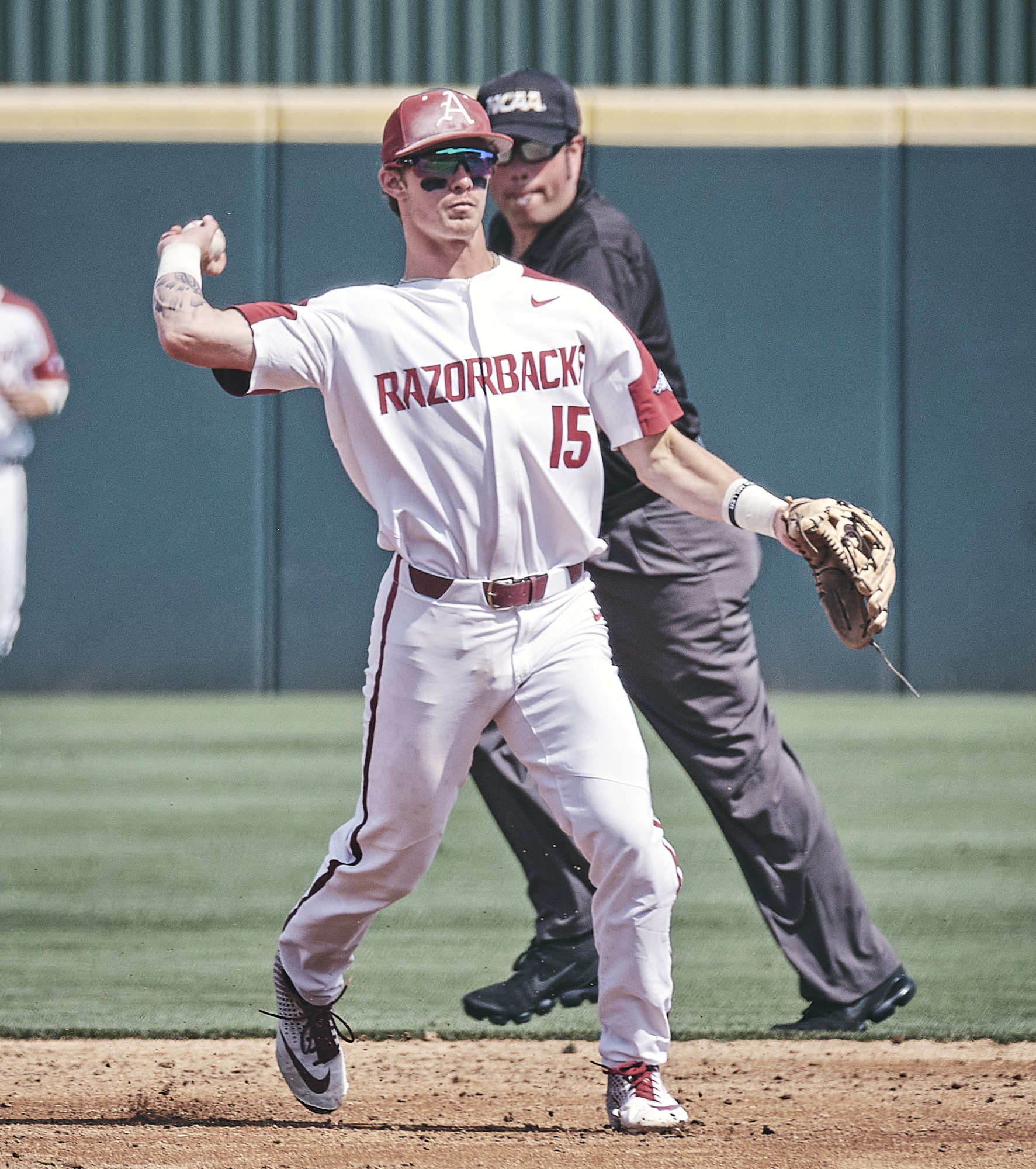
- Martin with the Arkansas Razorbacks

Milwaukee Brewers
- Shortstop
- Born: April 7, 1999 (age 27); Lonoke, Arkansas, U.S.
- Bats: Right Throws: Right
- Stats at Baseball Reference

Noah Casey Martin (born April 7, 1999) is an American professional baseball shortstop in the Milwaukee Brewers organization. Martin was selected by the Philadelphia Phillies in the third round (87th overall pick) of the 2020 Major League Baseball draft after playing college baseball at Arkansas.

== Amateur career ==
Martin grew up in Lonoke, Arkansas and attended Lonoke High School, where he played football and baseball and ran track. As a junior, Martin batted .508 with 18 extra base hits, 30 runs batted in (RBIs), and 25 runs scored, while also posting a 0.70 earned run average (ERA), with 18 strikeouts, in ten innings pitched. He hit .595 with 66 hits, 13 doubles, six triples, 10 home runs, 32 RBIs, and 34 stolen bases and was named the Arkansas Gatorade Player of the Year, in his senior year.

As a true freshman, Martin hit .345 with 87 hits, 14 doubles, 13 home runs, and 49 RBIs, while playing third base and was named to the SEC All-Freshman team, second team All-SEC, and a freshman All-American by the National Collegiate Baseball Writers Association and the Collegiate Baseball Newspaper. As a sophomore, Martin moved to shortstop and batted .286, with 15 home runs, and 57 RBI, and was named second team All-SEC and was a semifinalist for the Dick Howser Trophy.

Martin entered his junior season on the watch list for the Golden Spikes Award, a preseason first team All-SEC selection, a third team preseason All-American and as a top prospect for the 2020 Major League Baseball draft.

== Professional career ==
=== Philadelphia Phillies ===
Martin was selected in the third round (87th overall) of the 2020 Major League Baseball draft by the Philadelphia Phillies. Martin signed with the team for a $1.3 million bonus. He did not play in a game in 2020 due to the cancellation of the minor league season because of the COVID-19 pandemic.

Martin was assigned to the Low-A Clearwater Threshers to start the 2021 season. He also spent time with the High-A Jersey Shore BlueClaws during the season. Over 98 games between the two teams, he slashed .198/.291/.310 with seven home runs, 42 RBI, 17 stolen bases and 21 doubles. Martin returned to Jersey Shore in 2022, playing in 110 games and batting .181/.235/.281 with five home runs, 33 RBI, and 17 stolen bases.

Martin split the 2023 campaign between Jersey Shore and the Double–A Reading Fightin Phils, hitting a cumulative .226/.298/.366 with a career–high 11 home runs, 37 RBI, and 22 stolen bases. He began 2024 with Reading, hitting .167/.216/.297 with four home runs, 11 RBI, and six stolen bases across 43 appearances.

=== Milwaukee Brewers ===
On June 14, 2024, Martin was traded to the Milwaukee Brewers and was subsequently assigned to the Double-A Biloxi Shuckers.
