= Carlisle Rock Island Depot =

- U.S. National Register of Historic Places
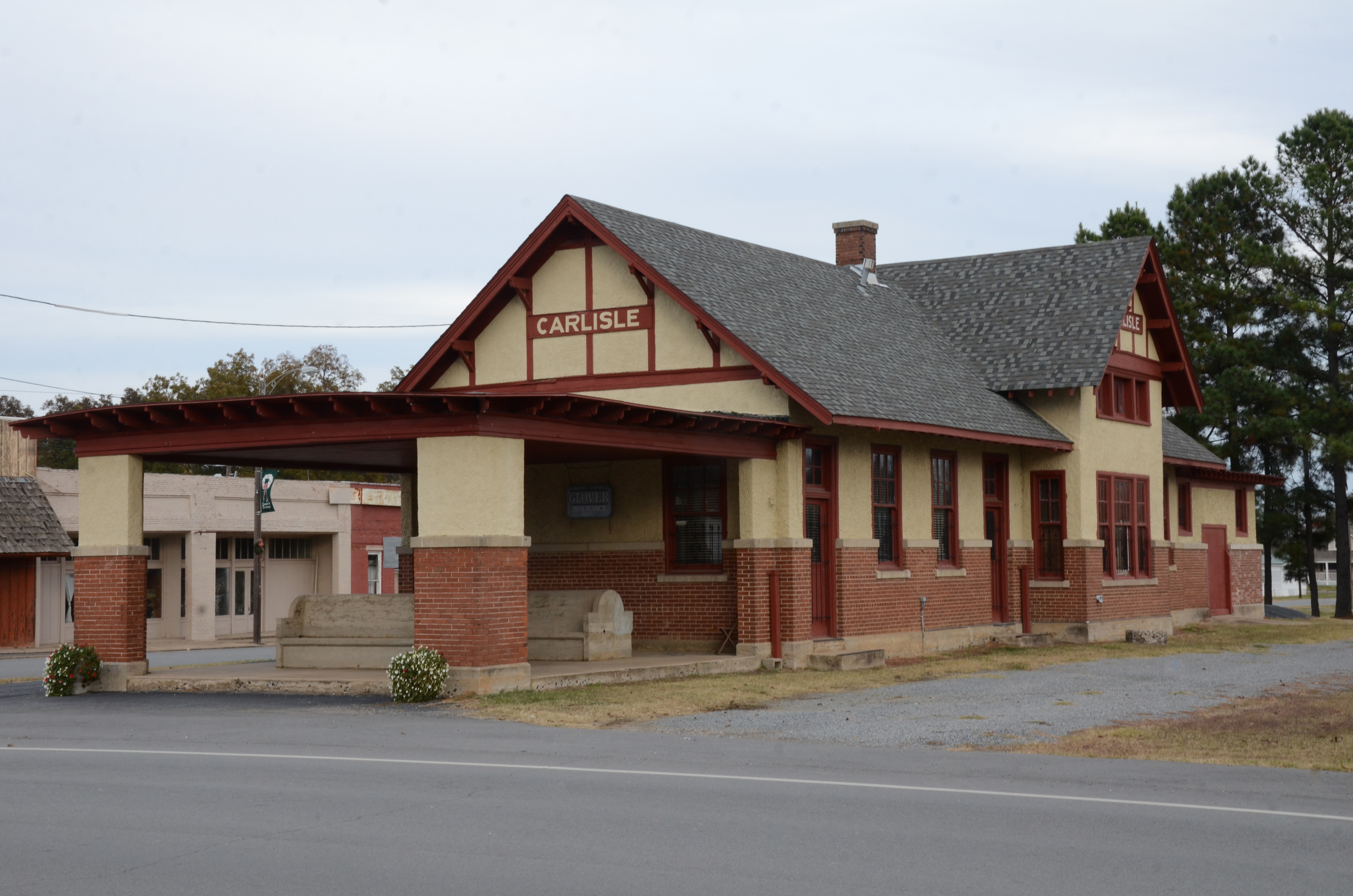

- Location within Arkansas Location within the United States
- Location: Jct. of Main St. and Court St., Carlisle, Arkansas
- Coordinates: 34°46′58″N 91°44′46″W
- Area: less than one acre
- Built by: Rock Island Railroad
- Architectural style: Tudor Revival
- NRHP reference No.: 90000905
- Added to NRHP: June 14, 1990

The Carlisle Rock Island Depot is a historic railroad station at Main and Court Streets in Carlisle, Arkansas.

== Description and history ==
The Carlisle Rock Island Depot is a 1 1/2-story masonry and frame structure, finished in brick with half-timbered stucco. A passenger station, it was organized with a central service area for ticketing and telegrapher's bay, with waiting rooms on either side, one for whites, and one for African-Americans. The station was built about 1920 by the Rock Island Railroad; it is a prominent local example of Tudor Revival style, and is historically significant for its role in the growth of the city of Carlisle. The station played a significant role in Arkansas history when publicity campaigns were run in Illinois and Iowa encouraging people to move to Arkansas during the boom years of 1905-1920.

The building was listed on the National Register of Historic Places in 1990.

== See also ==
- National Register of Historic Places listings in Lonoke County, Arkansas

Preceding station	Chicago, Rock Island and Pacific Railroad	Following station
Lonoke toward Tucumcari	Tucumcari – Memphis	Screeton toward Memphis
