= Trimble House (Lonoke, Arkansas) =

Historic house in Arkansas, United States

- U.S. National Register of Historic Places
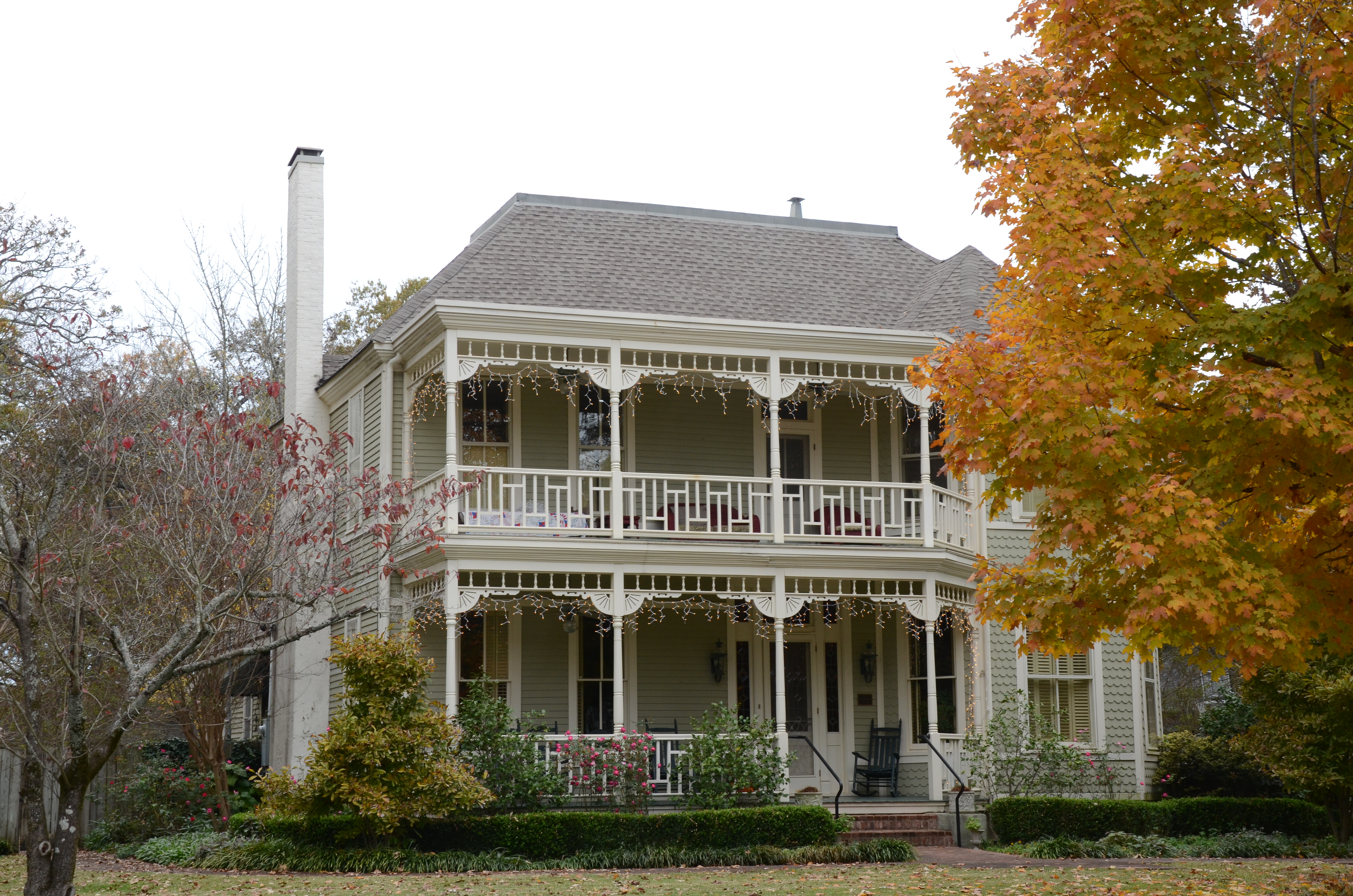

- Location within Arkansas Location within the United States
- Location: 518 Center St., Lonoke, Arkansas
- Coordinates: 34°46′46″N 91°53′59″W
- Area: less than one acre
- Built: 1916
- Architect: Charles L. Thompson
- Architectural style: Bungalow/craftsman
- MPS: Thompson, Charles L., Design Collection TR
- NRHP reference No.: 82000860
- Added to NRHP: December 22, 1982

The Trimble House is a historic house at 518 Center Street in Lonoke, Arkansas. It is a large 2 1/2-story wood-frame structure, with a tall gabled roof. A large gabled section relieves the left side of the gable, and a gable section projects from the front, from which the entry porch, also gabled, projects. Built in 1916, it is a fine example of Craftsman architecture, designed by Charles L. Thompson.

The house was listed on the National Register of Historic Places in 1982.

== See also ==
- National Register of Historic Places listings in Lonoke County, Arkansas
