= National Register of Historic Places listings in Lonoke County, Arkansas =

Location of Lonoke County in Arkansas

This is a list of the National Register of Historic Places listings in Lonoke County, Arkansas.

This is intended to be a complete list of the properties and districts on the National Register of Historic Places in Lonoke County, Arkansas, United States. The locations of National Register properties and districts for which the latitude and longitude coordinates are included below, may be seen in a map.

There are 35 properties and districts listed on the National Register in the county, including 1 National Historic Landmark. Another property was once listed but has been removed.

Contents: Counties in Arkansas
- Arkansas
- Ashley
- Baxter
- Benton
- Boone
- Bradley
- Calhoun
- Carroll
- Chicot
- Clark
- Clay
- Cleburne
- Cleveland
- Columbia
- Conway
- Craighead
- Crawford
- Crittenden
- Cross
- Dallas
- Desha
- Drew
- Faulkner
- Franklin
- Fulton
- Garland
- Grant
- Greene
- Hempstead
- Hot Spring
- Howard
- Independence
- Izard
- Jackson
- Jefferson
- Johnson
- Lafayette
- Lawrence
- Lee
- Lincoln
- Little River
- Logan
- Lonoke
- Madison
- Marion
- Miller
- Mississippi
- Monroe
- Montgomery
- Nevada
- Newton
- Ouachita
- Perry
- Phillips
- Pike
- Poinsett
- Polk
- Pope
- Prairie
- Pulaski (Little Rock)
- Randolph
- St. Francis
- Saline
- Scott
- Searcy
- Sebastian
- Sevier
- Sharp
- Stone
- Union
- Van Buren
- Washington
- White
- Woodruff
- Yell

This National Park Service list is complete through NPS recent listings posted December 19, 2025.

== Current listings ==
	Name on the Register	Image	Date listed	Location	City or town	Description
1	Ashley-Alexander House	Ashley-Alexander House	June 18, 1976 (#76000431)	North of Scott; 34°42′21″N 92°05′33″W	Scott	
2	Bank of Carlisle	Bank of Carlisle	January 4, 2022 (#100007317)	113 North Court St. 34°47′00″N 91°44′48″W	Carlisle	
3	Thomas Sloan Boyd House	Thomas Sloan Boyd House	January 1, 1976 (#76000430)	220 Park Ave. 34°46′55″N 91°54′07″W	Lonoke	
4	J. M. Bransford House	J. M. Bransford House	September 27, 2019 (#100004440)	506 S. Center St. 34°46′47″N 91°54′01″W	Lonoke	
5	Camp Nelson Confederate Cemetery	Camp Nelson Confederate Cemetery	May 3, 1996 (#96000503)	Rye St., approximately 1 mile northwest of the junction of Highways 319 and 321; 34°56′46″N 91°58′49″W	Cabot	
6	Carlisle Rock Island Depot	Carlisle Rock Island Depot	June 14, 1990 (#90000905)	Junction of Main St. and Court Ave. 34°46′58″N 91°44′46″W	Carlisle	
7	Carver Gymnasium	Carver Gymnasium	September 23, 2009 (#09000741)	400 Ferguson St. 34°46′51″N 91°53′47″W	Lonoke	Building demolished, foundation remains as of 2022
8	Coy Mound Site	Coy Mound Site	September 22, 1995 (#95001120)	Next to Indian-Bakers Bayou; 34°32′56″N 91°53′24″W	Coy	
9	Dairyman's Bank Building	Dairyman's Bank Building	October 29, 2019 (#100004439)	124 W. Main St. 34°46′58″N 91°44′52″W	Carlisle	
10	Dortch Plantation	Dortch Plantation	December 6, 1975 (#75000397)	Northeast of Scott off Highway 130 at Bearskin Lake; 34°42′55″N 92°03′13″W	Scott	
11	Eagle House	Eagle House	December 22, 1982 (#82000858)	217 Ash St. 34°46′57″N 91°54′06″W	Lonoke	
12	Joe P. Eagle and D. R. Boone Building	Joe P. Eagle and D. R. Boone Building	December 9, 1994 (#94001462)	105-107 W. Front St. 34°47′01″N 91°54′01″W	Lonoke	
13	First Christian Church	First Christian Church	July 9, 1997 (#97000748)	Junction of 2nd and Depot Sts. 34°47′07″N 91°54′04″W	Lonoke	
14	First Presbyterian Church	First Presbyterian Church	September 23, 2004 (#04001037)	304 S. Center St. 34°46′53″N 91°54′01″W	Lonoke	
15	W.P. Fletcher House	W.P. Fletcher House	September 5, 1990 (#90001373)	604 W. 4th St. 34°47′14″N 91°54′19″W	Lonoke	
16	Keo Commercial Historic District	Keo Commercial Historic District	June 15, 2011 (#11000355)	Main & Fleming Sts., Arkansas Highway 232; 34°36′02″N 92°00′33″W	Keo	Cotton and Rice Farm History and Architecture in the Arkansas Delta MPS
17	Lonoke Confederate Monument	Lonoke Confederate Monument	May 3, 1996 (#96000508)	On the courthouse lawn, near the junction of 3rd and Center Sts. 34°47′09″N 91°53′58″W	Lonoke	
18	Lonoke County Courthouse	Lonoke County Courthouse	June 8, 1982 (#82002121)	N. Center St. 34°47′09″N 91°53′57″W	Lonoke	
19	Lonoke Downtown Historic District	Lonoke Downtown Historic District	May 10, 1996 (#96000528)	Junction of Front and Center Sts. 34°47′05″N 91°53′58″W	Lonoke	
20	Memphis to Little Rock Road-Bayou Two Prairie Segment		September 20, 2006 (#06000836)	Address Restricted	Brownsville	A segment of the Trail of Tears
21	Memphis to Little Rock Road-Brownsville Segment		September 27, 2003 (#03000954)	Address Restricted	Brownsville	A segment of the Trail of Tears
22	Morris House		May 30, 2019 (#100004000)	16284 AR 89; 34°48′24″N 91°56′42″W	Lonoke	
23	Rock Island Depot	Rock Island Depot	October 4, 1984 (#84000006)	U.S. Route 70 and Center St. 34°47′02″N 91°54′02″W	Lonoke	
24	Sears House	Sears House	August 5, 1992 (#92000952)	Southeast of the junction of Highways 38 and 319; 34°59′05″N 91°57′43″W	Austin	
25	Shull House	Shull House	December 22, 1982 (#82000859)	418 Park; 34°46′48″N 91°54′05″W	Lonoke	
26	Standard Oil Company of Louisiana Oil Depot		January 24, 2023 (#100008563)	Northwest corner of AR 9 and Mill St. 34°47′10″N 91°54′35″W	Lonoke	
27	Toltec Mounds	Toltec Mounds	January 12, 1973 (#73000382)	Off United States Route 165; 34°38′49″N 92°03′55″W	Scott	State park
28	Trimble House	Trimble House	December 22, 1982 (#82000860)	518 Center St. 34°46′46″N 91°53′59″W	Lonoke	
29	Trimble-McCrary House	Trimble-McCrary House	September 24, 2004 (#04001038)	516 Jefferson; 34°46′45″N 91°54′10″W	Lonoke	
30	US 70, Union Valley Segment	US 70, Union Valley Segment	September 23, 2004 (#04001040)	North and south of U.S. Route 70 from the S28/S29 boundary line R9W west to the S26/S27 boundary line R10W; 34°45′56″N 92°01′25″W	Union Valley	
31	Dr. E.F. Utley House	Dr. E.F. Utley House	June 3, 1998 (#98000623)	401 W. Pine St. 35°00′43″N 92°01′04″W	Cabot	
32	Walls Farm Barn and Corn Crib		November 29, 1995 (#95001379)	Highway 31 north of Tomberlin; 34°31′26″N 91°52′26″W	Tomberlin	Destroyed
33	Walls House	Walls House	December 22, 1982 (#82000861)	406 Jefferson St. 34°46′49″N 91°54′12″W	Lonoke	
34	Wheat House	Wheat House	December 22, 1982 (#82000862)	600 Center St. 34°46′43″N 91°53′59″W	Lonoke	
35	Woodlawn School Building	Woodlawn School Building	February 25, 1993 (#93000086)	Northwest of the junction of Highway 31 and Bizzell Rd. 34°55′22″N 91°52′30″W	Woodlawn	

== Former listing ==
	Name on the Register	Image	Date listed	Date removed	Location	City or town	Description
1	St. Louis Southwest Railway (Cotton Belt Route) Depot		January 22, 2004 (#03001459)	January 23, 2008	Main St. (Highway 31)	Coy	

== See also ==
- List of National Historic Landmarks in Arkansas
- National Register of Historic Places listings in Arkansas
