= Lonoke School District =

School district in Arkansas, United States

Address
- 401 West Holly Street Lonoke, Arkansas, 72086; United States

District information
- Type: Public
- Grades: PreK–12
- NCES District ID: 0509060

Students and staff
- Students: 1,644
- Teachers: 113.69
- Staff: 109.51
- Student–teacher ratio: 14.46

Other information
- Website: www.lonokeschools.org

Lonoke School District is a school district in Lonoke County, Arkansas.

== Schools ==
The District includes:

- Lonoke Primary School
- Lonoke Elementary School
- Lonoke Middle School
- Lonoke High School
- Lonoke Business Academy
