= Lonoke High School =

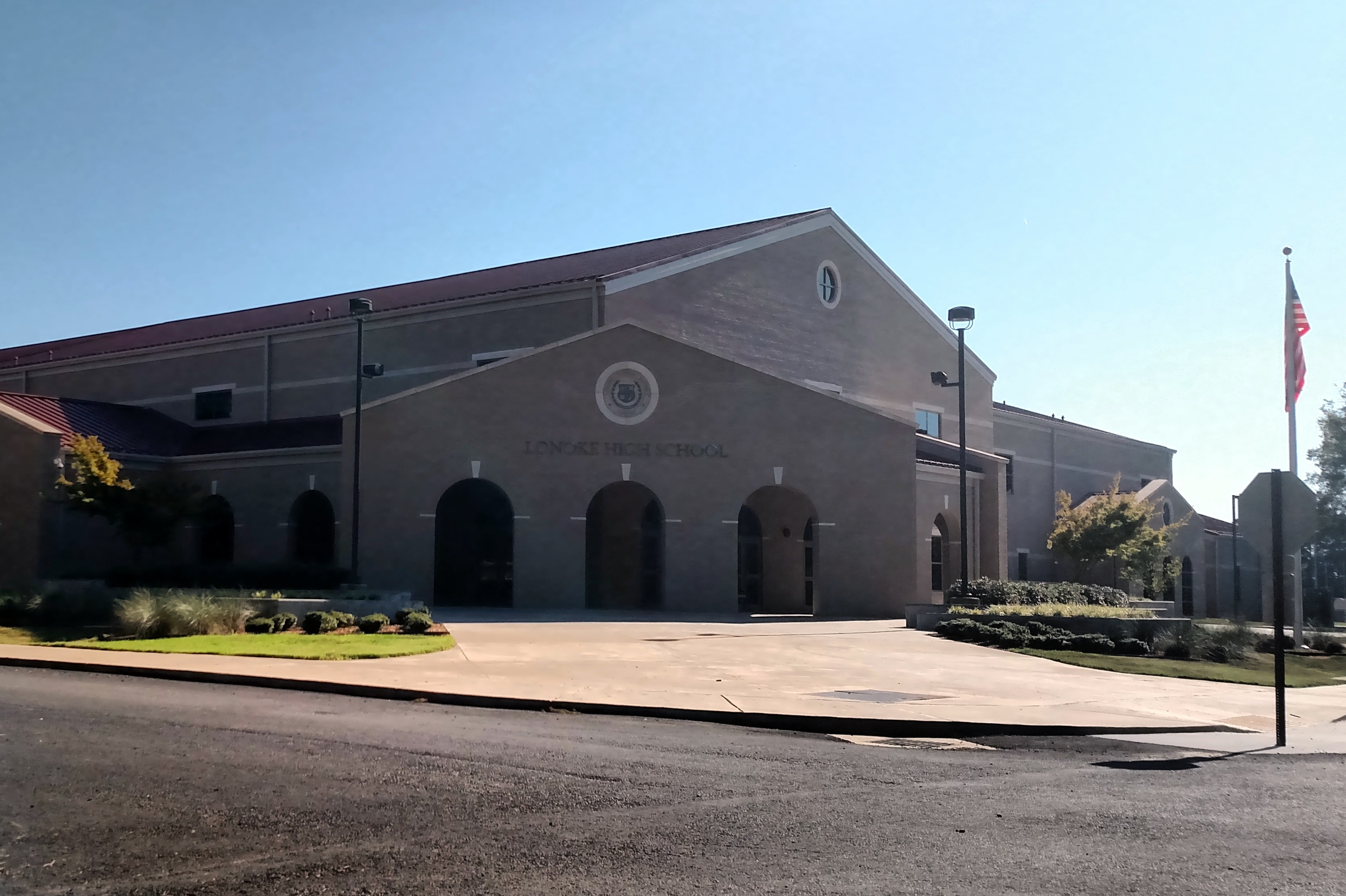

Location
- 501 West Academy Street; Lonoke, Arkansas 72086; United States; 34°46′48″N 91°54′19″W

Information
- School type: Public comprehensive
- Founded: 1879 (147 years ago)
- Status: Open
- School district: Lonoke School District
- CEEB code: 041470
- NCES School ID: 050906000642
- Teaching staff: 71.20 (on FTE basis)
- Grades: 9–12
- Enrollment: 493 (2023-2024)
- Student to teacher ratio: 6.92
- Education system: ADE Smart Core
- Classes offered: Regular, Advanced Placement (AP)
- Colors: Purple and white
- Athletics: Football, Golf, Basketball, Baseball, Softball, Track, Swimming
- Athletics conference: 4A Region 2
- Mascot: Jackrabbit
- Team name: Lonoke Jackrabbits
- Accreditation: ADE; AdvancED (1926–)
- Newspaper: The Paw Print
- Website: lhs.lonokeschools.org

Lonoke High School is a nationally recognized and accredited public high school located in the rural community of Lonoke, Arkansas, United States. The school provides comprehensive secondary education for approximately 550 students each year in grades 9 through 12. It is one of four public high schools in Lonoke County, Arkansas, and the only high school administered by the Lonoke School District.

== History ==
By 1879, the citizens of Lonoke collected $10,000 to supplement state funding to begin to create a free ten-month public school. In 1900, a massive school building (alleged to be the largest wooden-frame structure in the state, with its two stories and three wings) was built. That building was lost by fire in 1931, and a brick school was built that continues as the high school. The Lonoke Colored School began around 1878 with classes through the eighth grade. In 1945, the name became the George Washington Carver School when it expanded its curriculum through high school. The schools integrated in 1970, with Carver school continuing as the middle school. In 2004, citizens voted and passed a bond issue to build a new Lonoke Middle School and gymnasium.

== Academics ==
Lonoke High School is accredited by the Arkansas Department of Education (ADE) and has been accredited by AdvancED since 1926. The assumed course of study follows the Smart Core curriculum developed by the ADE. Students complete regular (core and elective) and career focus coursework and exams and may take Advanced Placement (AP) courses and exams with the opportunity to receive college credit.

== Athletics ==
The Lonoke High School mascot and athletic emblem is the fighting jackrabbit with purple and white serving as the school colors.

The Lonoke Jackrabbits compete in interscholastic activities within the 4A Classification via the 4A Region 2 Conference as administered by the Arkansas Activities Association. The Jackrabbits participate in football, volleyball, golf (boys/girls), basketball (boys/girls), cheer, dance, baseball, softball, swimming (boys/girls), and track and field (boys/girls).

The Jackrabbits have won at least 16 state championships in its history, including:

- Football: The Lonoke football won its classification's 1994 state championship.
- Golf: The boys golf teams have won two state championships (1994, 1998). With individual Golf State titles in (1993 & 1994).
- Basketball: The boys basketball teams have won five state championships (1969, 1982, 1999, 2000, 2008). The girls team won its only championship in 1977.
- Baseball: The Jackrabbits baseball team have won two state championships (1969, 2023).
- Track and field: The boys track and field team won the state's first championship in 1920 and have won six titles in its history (1920, 1923, 1936, 1941, 1957, 1990).

== Notable alumni ==
The following are notable people associated with Lonoke High School (graduation year in parentheses).

- Maurice Britt – recipient of the Medal of Honor; Arkansas Lt. Governor and former NFL player
- Conner Eldridge (1996) - attorney
- Ed Hamm (1925) – athlete; gold medalist in the long jump at the 1928 Summer Olympics and former world high school record holder in long jump
- Zakee Wadood (2000) – professional basketball player
- Casey Martin (baseball) (2017) — professional baseball player
