= Trimble-McCrary House =

Historic house in Arkansas, United States

- U.S. National Register of Historic Places
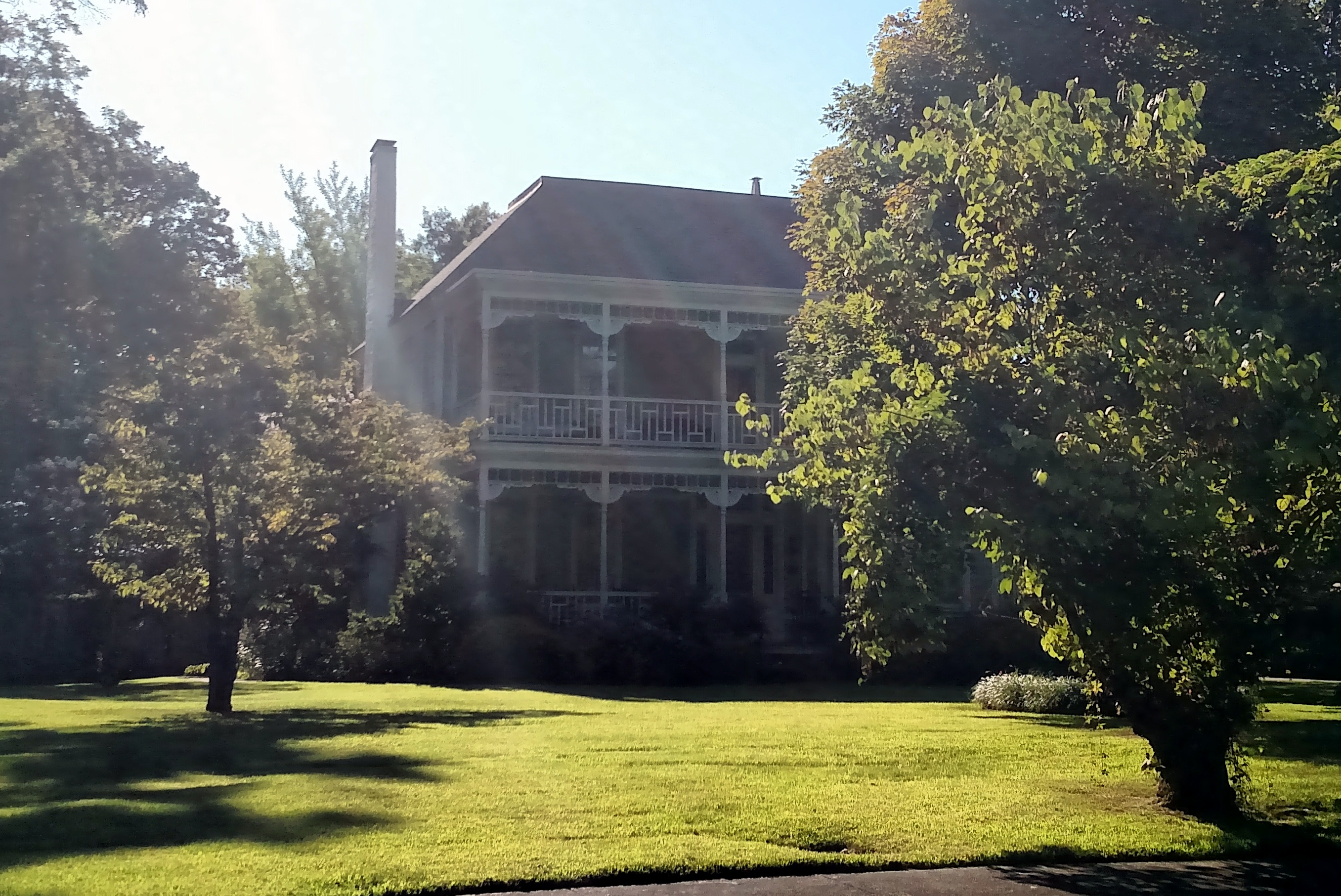

- Location within Arkansas Location within the United States
- Location: 516 Jefferson, Lonoke, Arkansas
- Coordinates: 34°46′45″N 91°54′10″W
- Area: 3.3 acres (1.3 ha)
- Built: 1885
- Architectural style: Late Victorian
- NRHP reference No.: 04001038
- Added to NRHP: September 24, 2004

The Trimble-McCrary House is a historic house located at 516 Jefferson Street in Lonoke, Arkansas. Built around 1885, this two-story wood-frame structure features a truncated hip roof, an exterior clad in clapboards and wooden shingles, and a brick foundation. It exhibits Folk Victorian styling, highlighted by a two-story spindlework porch and fish-scale shingling on portions of its walls. The house was constructed for Judge Jacob Chapline, a lawyer influential in establishing Lonoke County and who served in the state legislature.

The house was listed on the National Register of Historic Places in 2004.

== See also ==
- National Register of Historic Places listings in Lonoke County, Arkansas
