= W.P. Fletcher House =

Historic house in Arkansas, United States

- W. P. Fletcher House
- U.S. National Register of Historic Places
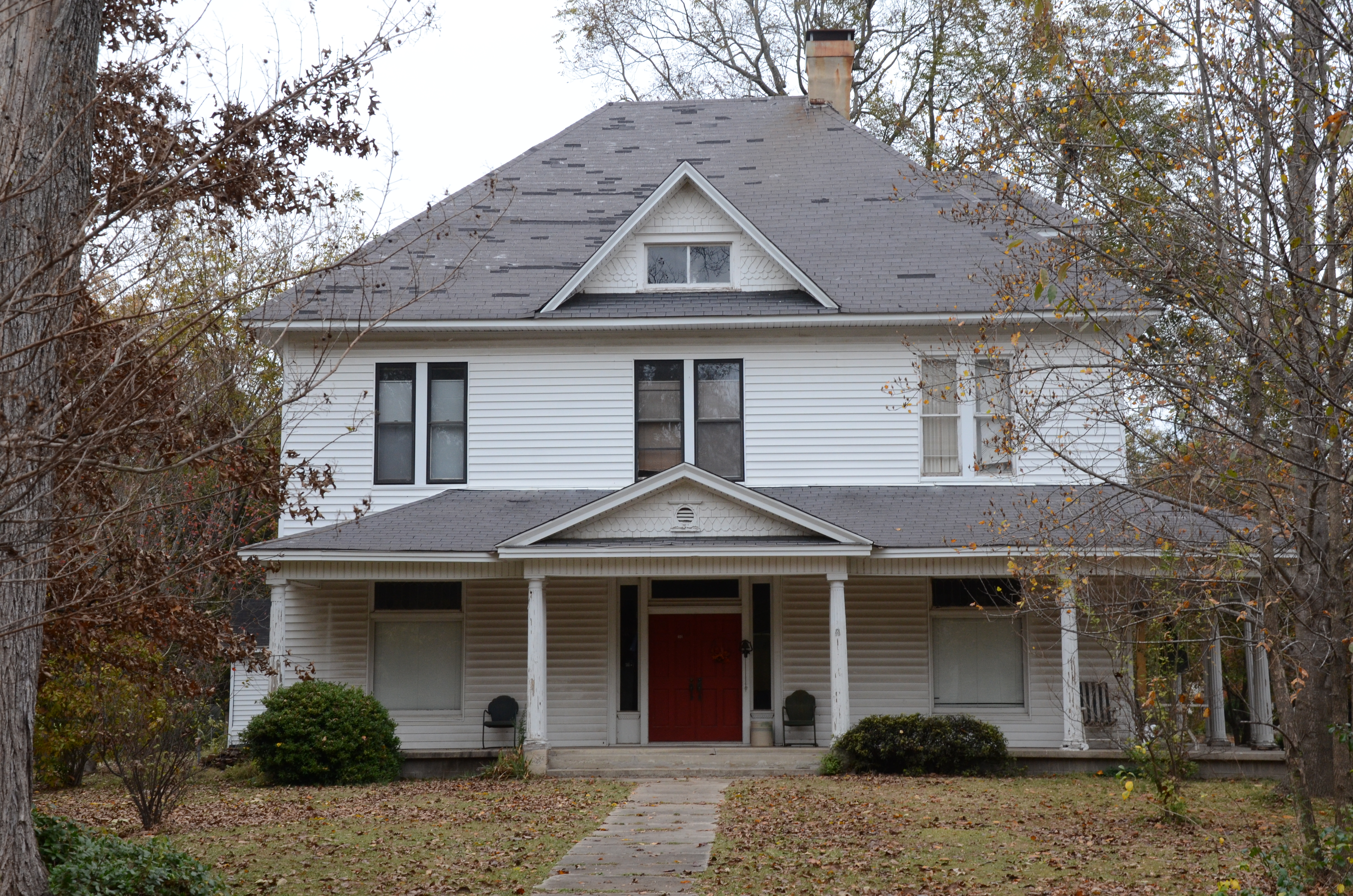

- Location within Arkansas Location within the United States
- Location: 604 W. Fourth St., Lonoke, Arkansas
- Coordinates: 34°47′14″N 91°54′19″W
- Area: less than one acre
- Built: 1903
- Architectural style: Colonial Revival
- NRHP reference No.: 90001373
- Added to NRHP: September 5, 1990

The W.P. Fletcher House is a historic house at 604 West Fourth Street in Lonoke, Arkansas. It is a 2 1/2-story L-shaped wood-frame structure, with a hip-roofed main block and a gabled ell to the rear. It is clad in weatherboard and set on a foundation of brick piers. A hip-roofed single-story porch extends across two sides, with gabled sections on each side. The oldest portion of the house is the ell, which was built about 1880, with the main block added in 1903. The 1903 Colonial Revival house was built for William P. Fletcher, a leading businessman in the locally important rice growing and processing industry.

The house was listed on the National Register of Historic Places in 1990.

== See also ==
- National Register of Historic Places listings in Lonoke County, Arkansas
