= Walls Farm Barn and Corn Crib =

- U.S. National Register of Historic Places
- Location within Arkansas Location within the United States
- Nearest city: Tomberlin, Arkansas
- Coordinates: 34°31′26″N 91°52′26″W
- Area: less than one acre
- Built: 1907
- Architectural style: Late 19th And Early 20th Century American Movements, Plain Traditional
- NRHP reference No.: 95001379
- Added to NRHP: November 29, 1995

The Walls Farm Barn and Corn Crib were historic farm outbuildings in rural southern Lonoke County, Arkansas. The barn was a two-story gable-roofed structure, with a broad central hall and a shed-roof extension to one side. The corn crib was a single story frame structure, with a gable-roofed center and shed-roofed extensions around each side. They were built c. 1907–08, and were relatively unaltered examples of period farm architecture when they were listed on the National Register of Historic Places in 1995. The buildings have been listed as destroyed in the Arkansas Historic Preservation Program database.

== See also ==
- Martindale Corn Crib: NRHP-listed in White County, Arkansas
- National Register of Historic Places listings in Lonoke County, Arkansas
