= Tomberlin, Arkansas =

- Unincorporated community
- Location within Arkansas Location within the United States
- Coordinates: 34°30′57″N 91°52′17″W
- Country: United States
- State: Arkansas
- County: Washington
- Township: Indian Bayou
- Elevation: 220 ft (67 m)
- Time zone: UTC-6 (Central (CST))
  - Summer (DST): UTC-5 (CDT)
- ZIP code: 72046
- Area code: 870
- GNIS feature ID: 58753

Tomberlin (formerly Haberton) is an unincorporated community in Indian Bayou Township, Lonoke County, Arkansas, United States. It is located along Highway 31 at an intersection with Tar Bottom Road. Just north of Tomberlin is the Walls Farm Barn and Corn Crib, listed on the National Register of Historic Places.
