= Terry Homestead =

Demolished historic house in Bristol, Connecticut

Coordinates: 41.6682°N 72.9236°W

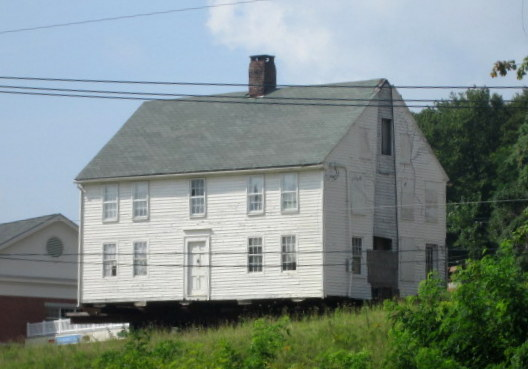
Fletcher Terry House in August 2012 before demolition

The Bristol Fletcher Terry Homestead (also known as the Terry Homestead and Fletcher Terry House) was a historical building in Bristol, Connecticut dating to 1748. After years of neglect, the building was demolished in 2012–2013.

== History ==
The Terry homestead was built in 1748 by William Barnes. In 1751, Barnes sold the home to Samuel Cooke who, two months later, sold it to Elnathan Ives and his wife Ruth. The next inhabitants where Reuben and Elizabeth Ives with their child Joseph. The house was later bought in 1805 by Colonel Thomas Botsford, and his wife Ruth Lewis. When the town schoolhouse burned down, the house was used as a temporary school building. Their daughter was Julian Botsford, who married William Hubbel. They had four children, including three who did not live past 14 years. Their daughter Ruth Lewis married Ralph E Terry (the son of Samuel Terry). Samuel Terry purchased a gristmill adjacent to the property and converted it into his clock factory.

The homestead remained in the Terry family until it transferred into the Fletcher family through marriage. The Fletcher family inhabited the home and let the Historical Society use five large rooms in the front of the house until the house was sold in 2001. After 2002, the building was bought by Chatham Lake One LLC. The company moved the house across the property with plans of restoring it as they built a commercial development on the lot. However, the house was abandoned. In early 2012, Chatham Lake announced that the house was too damaged to restore and would be demolished.

== Structure ==
The original house was simply a large kitchen with one single bedroom in the attic. The kitchen had a six bay bread oven fireplace, along with a huge main fireplace. The kitchen was believed to be built in around 1730, or 1740 (the true date is unknown). In 1748, the front of the house was built; a traditional 5 bay clapboarded central hallway house. The wooden beams for the structure were believed to have actually been laid on the ground, or perhaps in the forest as trees where cut, and numbered with large roman numerals carved into the beams of the house. The numerals on the beams were: 1–6 on the front, and 1–4 on the side.

The house was built in the post and beam style, with pegs the size of three inch pipes. There were two rooms on the bottom left of the house, a center fireplace, a center staircase, center hallway, and one large room going the whole width of the house to the right. Notable work was done to the house in 1810, subsequent work done in 1830, and drastic work done in 1930. In 1930, the entire house was gutted, all doors replaced except for three, the center fireplace removed (entirely), walls demolished, a doorway closed up, and a whole new fireplace added in the north parlor. The entire center chimney was removed, however the top of the chimney remained, in order to keep the physical appearance of the house intact. In reality, the only original pieces of the home where floorboards, walls, and the top of the fireplace. The three original doors that remained, where left for a great reason of tradition. The coffin door on the south of the house, was left alone, it was never opened sense its last funeral, and stayed shut until February 28, 2013. Two doors — where basement and kitchen door — which were original to the house and date back to 1748 — and were made from Kings wood (illegal at the time) during the crisis of the Pine Tree Riot. Wooden boards had to be at most 12 inches wide, or a fine of 5 pounds per inch over. The doors measured 13, and 17 inches, leading to fines of over 35 pounds but the family was fortunately never caught by England. The first and second floor board were made of chestnut or hickory, and the attic boards were made with red pine.

In February 2013, the home was demolished.
