= Trimble House (Wickliffe, Kentucky) =

Historic house in Kentucky, United States

- U.S. National Register of Historic Places
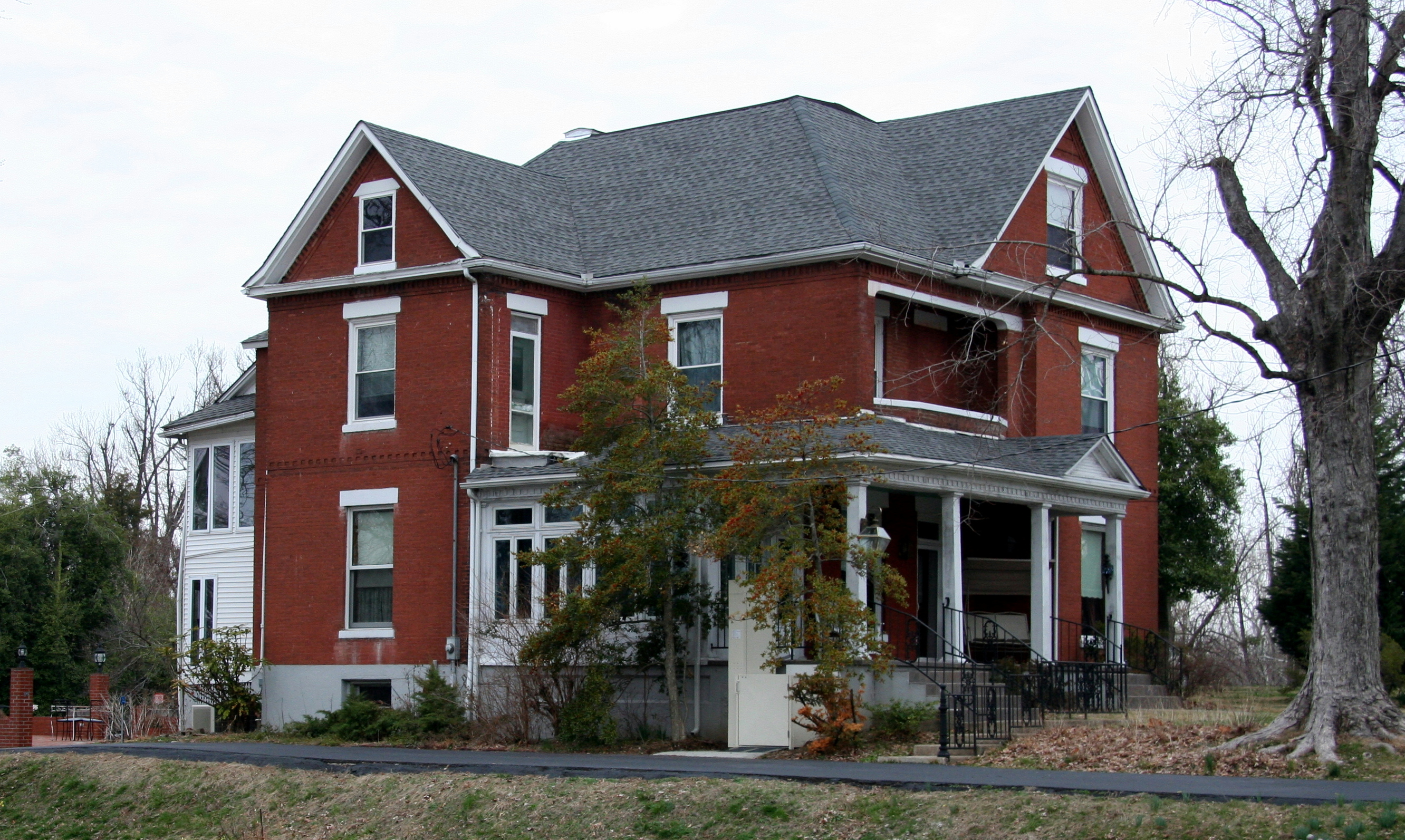

- Location within Kentucky Location within the United States
- Location: 725 N. 4th St., Wickliffe, Kentucky
- Coordinates: 36°58′16″N 89°05′19″W
- Area: 1.1 acres (0.45 ha)
- Built: 1905
- Architect: J.B. Legg, C.S. Holloway
- Architectural style: Queen Anne
- NRHP reference No.: 06001203
- Added to NRHP: January 4, 2007

The Trimble House is a Queen Anne home built in 1905 at 725 North Fourth Street in Wickliffe, Kentucky, United States. It was listed on the National Register of Historic Places in 2007.

The Kentucky Heritage Council released:

As with any house, many influences impacted the Trimble House: the architects, a Kentucky owner, and the culture along the banks of the Mississippi River. The home was constructed by a town banker, Isaac N. Trimble, who originally resided in a Victorian-era home before he and his neighbors were displaced by two railroads – the Gulf, Mobile, and Ohio and the Illinois Central. Trimble relocated to Dennett Heights, a prominent high spot in town, and in 1905 built one of the town’s first brick houses featuring a simply detailed yet complex Queen Anne-style structure. The home’s architects were J.B. Legg and C.S. Holloway of St. Louis, who also designed the Ballard County Courthouse and Methodist Episcopal Church. Current owners Martha and Jim Wilson have lived in the house since 1954 and recently completed an extensive remodeling.
