= Kennesaw House =

Coordinates: 33.95276°N 84.55017°W

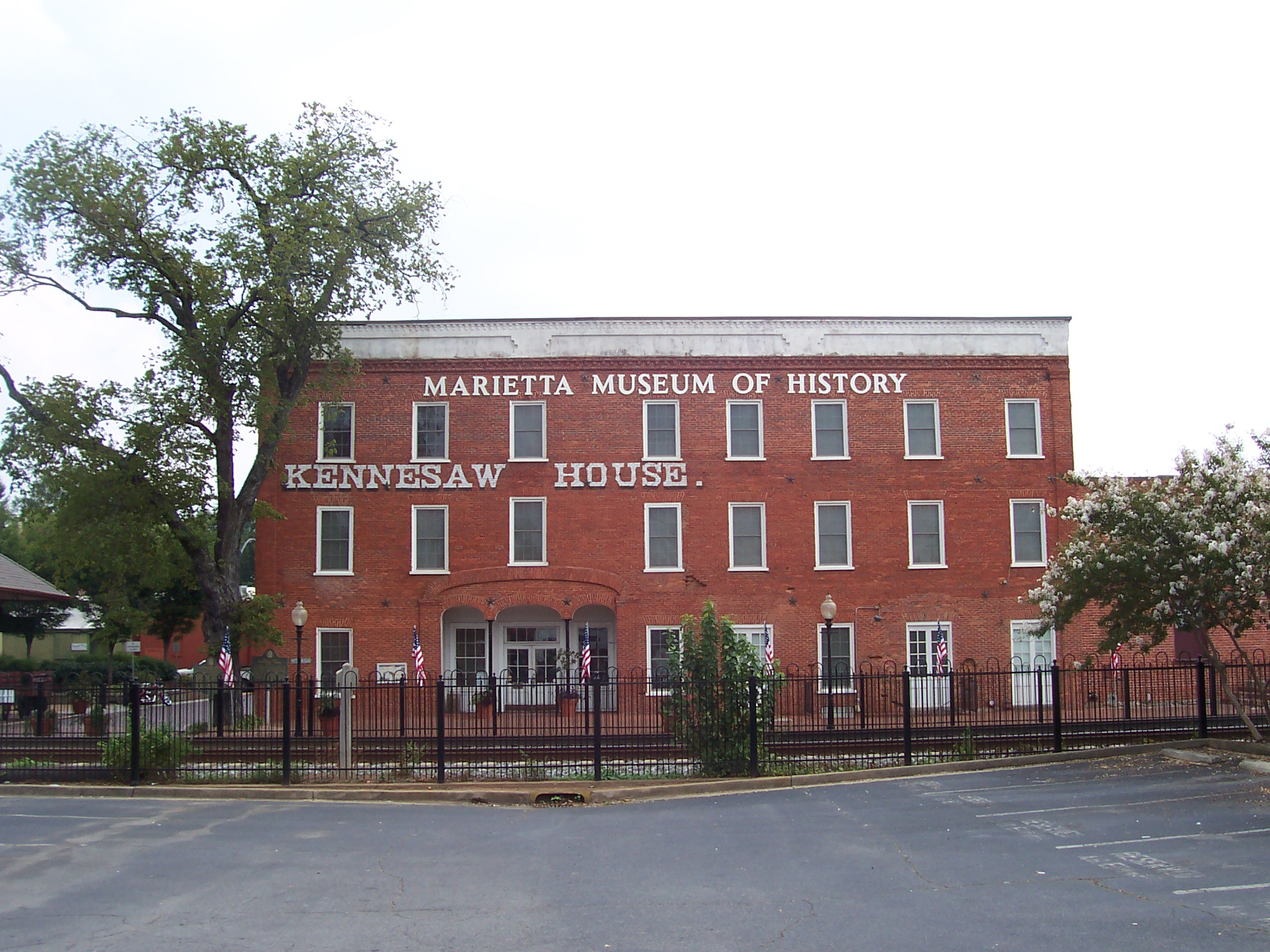
Historic Kennesaw House

The Kennesaw House is a three-story historic building in downtown Marietta, Georgia. It houses the Marietta History Center. The building is west of the town square, adjacent to the CSX (originally Western and Atlantic Railroad) tracks.

== History ==
The Kennesaw House was built in 1845, making it one of Marietta's oldest buildings. Intended to be a cotton warehouse, the building was turned into the Fletcher House hotel in 1855 after it was purchased by Dix Fletcher. The Fletcher as it was called was where the Great Locomotive Chase began. While some may claim it started in Big Shanty (now Kennesaw), it began at the Fletcher House. James Andrews, a civilian working with the Union Army, made his way down to Marietta along with disguised Union soldiers in April 1862. On the night of April 11, Andrews and some of the men spent the night at the Fletcher House. A historic reproduction of what the room may have looked like has been re-created at the Marietta Museum of History, in the room that the men supposedly slept. The men, along with their leader James Andrews boarded the train on April 12 with the rest of the passengers. The Kennesaw House was one of the only buildings in Marietta not burned to the ground during William Tecumseh Sherman's Atlanta campaign, partly because Fletcher was a Mason, and his son-in-law was a Union spy. The building, like many others on the Marietta square was converted to a war hospital for the Confederate Army and later Union Army.

In 1920, the first floor was renovated and converted to retail shops. In 1979, the entire building was renovated. The renovation included removing the white facade from the building to expose the original brickwork while completely demolishing the interior. The few original parts of the building are the wooden staircases and some of the fireplaces. The 1979 renovation saw the top two floors were converted into offices, with the bottom being the Brickworks restaurant. Finally, in 1996, the Marietta Museum of History (now the Marietta History Center) assumed occupancy of the second floor then took over the third floor after the Junior League and Southern Baseball Federation left. Since 2010, the Center occupies the entire building with the first floor containing an event rental space, Museum Store and staff offices. The second floor features the Center's exhibits and gallery spaces. The third floor contains the collections storage and the rest of the staff offices.
