= George Trimble House (Mechanicsburg, Pennsylvania) =

Historic house in Pennsylvania, United States

- U.S. National Register of Historic Places
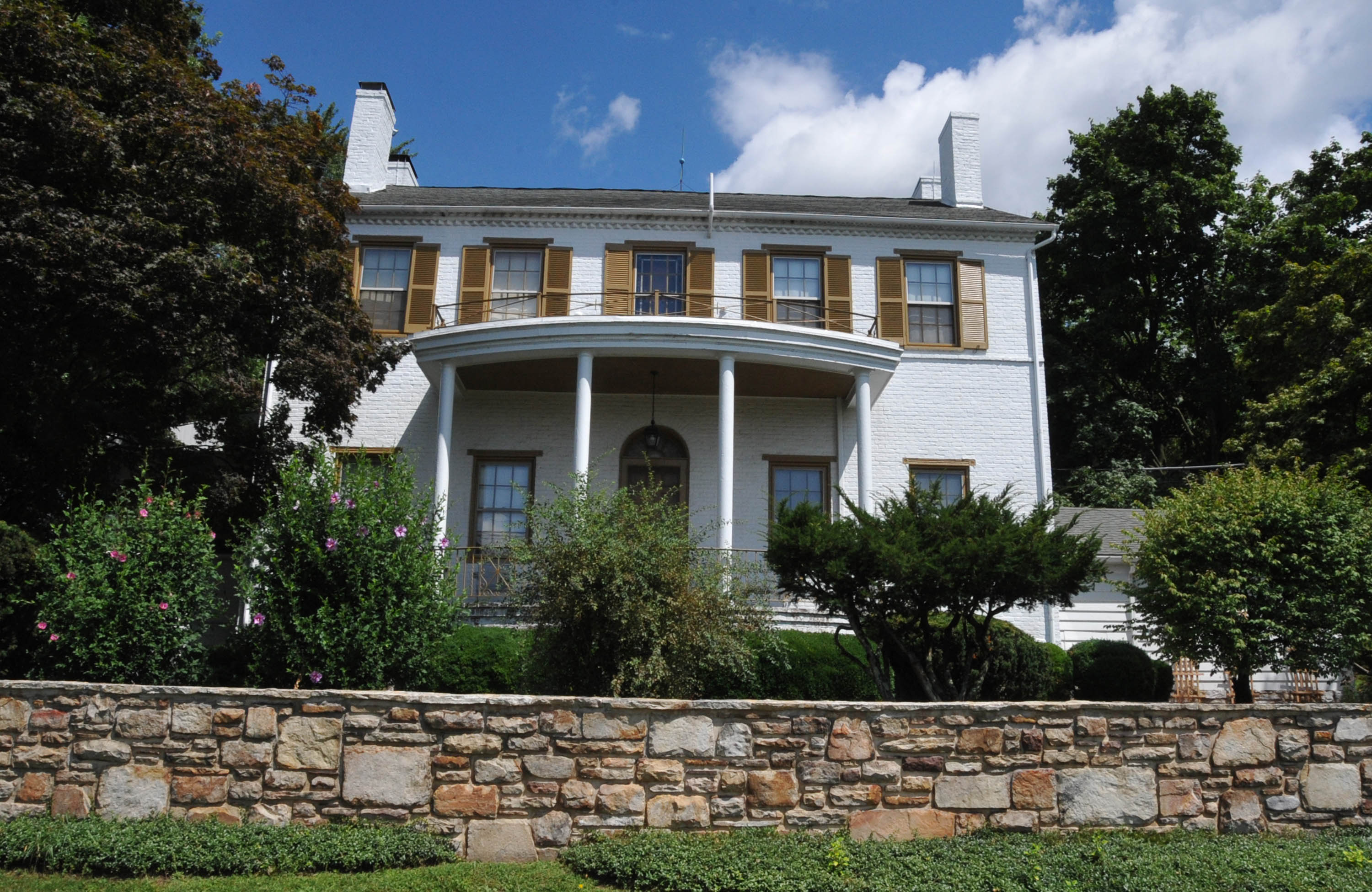

- Location within Pennsylvania Location within the United States
- Interactive map showing the location of George Trimble House
- Location: 50 Pleasant Grove Rd., Silver Spring Township, Pennsylvania
- Coordinates: 40°16′11″N 77°2′55″W
- Area: 1.4 acres (0.57 ha)
- Built: 1812
- Architectural style: Federal
- NRHP reference No.: 92000945
- Added to NRHP: July 24, 1992

George Trimble House is a historic home located at Silver Spring Township in Cumberland County, Pennsylvania, United States. It was built in 1812, and is a two-story, five bay wide brick building with a stone foundation and rear kitchen ell. It has a Federal style interior.

It was listed on the National Register of Historic Places in 1992.
