= Lonoke, Arkansas =

- City
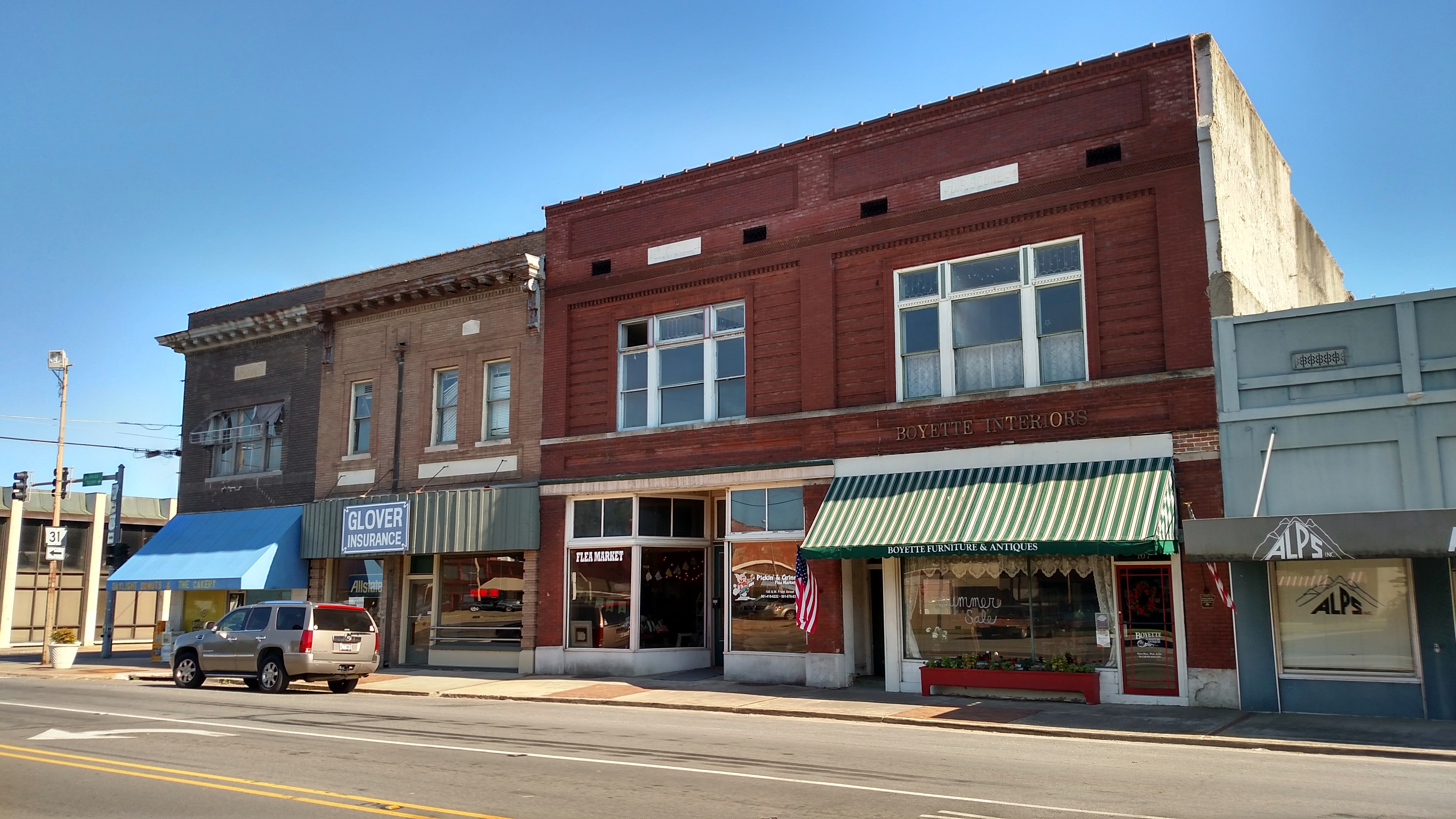
- Downtown Lonoke

- Location of Lonoke in Lonoke County, Arkansas.

- Location within the contiguous United States of America
- Coordinates: 34°47′3″N 91°54′3″W
- Country: United States
- State: Arkansas
- County: Lonoke
- Township: Lonoke
- Incorporated: January 22, 1872; 154 years ago
- Named for: "Lone Oak"

Government
  - Type: Mayor–Council
  - Mayor: (I)
  - Council: Lonoke City Council

Area
  - City: 4.90 sq mi (12.70 km^{2})
  - Land: 4.81 sq mi (12.45 km^{2})
  - Water: 0.097 sq mi (0.25 km^{2})
- Elevation: 233 ft (71 m)

Population (2020)
  - City: 4,276
  - Estimate (2025): 4,299 ▲
  - Density: 889.5/sq mi (343.45/km^{2})
  - Metro: 610,518 (Little Rock/North Little Rock
- Time zone: UTC-6 (CST)
  - Summer (DST): UTC-5 (CDT)
- ZIP code: 72086
- Area code: 501
- FIPS code: 05-41420
- GNIS feature ID: 2404954
- Major airport: LIT
- Website: cityoflonokear.gov

Lonoke (/ˈloʊnoʊk/) is the third most populous city in Lonoke County, Arkansas, United States, and serves as its county seat. As of the 2020 census, Lonoke had a population of 4,276. It is part of the Little Rock-North Little Rock-Conway metropolitan area.

== History ==
Union Army troops advanced through Central Arkansas during the American Civil War. The town of Brownsville was burned to the ground by Union forces after the retreat of Confederate forces westward to Little Rock. After the war, it was decided by the city leaders of Brownsville that a new town should be formed by the nearby railroad so that those who wished to stay could do so.

According to local legend, the town was named for a large red oak tree that stood alone on the prairie. It was named Lonoke by Major Rombaugh, a civil engineer for the Memphis and Little Rock Railroad, because he wanted it to sound more Native American.

The town of Lonoke grew moderately and became the county seat of Lonoke County in 1873. Lonoke maintained a sustainable population through the support of its agricultural based economy until World War II. Furthermore, Lonoke became a sort of suburban area of Little Rock due to the implementation of the Interstate Highway System and the construction of Interstate 40.

Eberts Field, used by the United States Army for pilot training during World War I and World War II, was located near Lonoke.

== Geography ==
Lonoke is in central Lonoke County.

According to the United States Census Bureau, the city has a total area of 4.6 square miles (12 km^{2}), of which 4.3 square miles (11 km^{2}) is land and 0.3 square miles (0.78 km^{2}) (6.07%) is water.

== Government ==
Lonoke is governed by a mayor-council form of city government, in which a mayor, other city administrators, and an eight-member city council are all regularly elected. The city is divided into eight districts (analogous to wards in other cities), each represented on the council by an alderman. In addition to the mayor, the city's clerk, treasurer, attorney and district judge are also popularly elected.

== Education ==
By 1879, the town of Lonoke had grown large enough to recognize the need for free public education. Since the state provided only limited funding, the citizens of Lonoke raised an additional $10,000 through private contributions. Together with the state funds, this money made it possible to start a free public school in the town, offering classes for ten months each year.

The city of Lonoke lacks post secondary institutions due to its small population and rural nature. However, Lonoke does feature a public school district that includes a primary, elementary, middle, and high school. According to the National Institute for Higher Education, Lonoke High School has an average ACT score of 22. However, over 89% of the graduating class of high school from 1987 to 2007 has been accepted to an institution of higher education. Of those 89%, approximately 45% have attended Arkansas State University Beebe.

In addition to its public school system, Lonoke is home to the main campus of the Lonoke Exceptional School, which offers learning opportunities for children and adults with various developmental disabilities. The school has served Lonoke and surrounding areas since 1972; its main campus in downtown Lonoke was built in 1991.

== Demographics ==
Historical population
Census	Pop.	Note	%±
1880	659		—
1890	858		30.2%
1900	951		10.8%
1910	1,547		62.7%
1920	1,711		10.6%
1930	1,674		−2.2%
1940	1,715		2.4%
1950	1,556		−9.3%
1960	2,359		51.6%
1970	3,140		33.1%
1980	4,128		31.5%
1990	4,022		−2.6%
2000	4,287		6.6%
2010	4,245		−1.0%
2020	4,276		0.7%
2025 (est.)	4,299	▲	0.5%
U.S. Decennial Census

=== 2020 census ===
Lonoke racial composition
Race	Number	Percentage
White (non-Hispanic)	2,664	62.3%
Black or African American (non-Hispanic)	1,152	26.94%
Native American	8	0.19%
Asian	31	0.72%
Pacific Islander	1	0.02%
Other/Mixed	169	3.95%
Hispanic or Latino	251	5.87%

As of the 2020 census, there were 4,276 people, 1,676 households, and 1,075 families residing in the city. The median age was 37.8 years. 25.1% of residents were under the age of 18 and 17.8% of residents were 65 years of age or older. For every 100 females there were 92.1 males, and for every 100 females age 18 and over there were 90.7 males age 18 and over.

0.0% of residents lived in urban areas, while 100.0% lived in rural areas.

Of all households, 35.6% had children under the age of 18 living in them. 42.4% were married-couple households, 16.0% were households with a male householder and no spouse or partner present, and 37.8% were households with a female householder and no spouse or partner present. About 29.7% of all households were made up of individuals and 13.5% had someone living alone who was 65 years of age or older.

There were 1,770 housing units, of which 10.2% were vacant. The homeowner vacancy rate was 3.0% and the rental vacancy rate was 6.4%.

=== 2000 census ===
As of the 2000 census, there were 4,287 people, 1,595 households, and 1,092 families residing in the city. The population density was 990.0 inhabitants per square mile (382.2/km^{2}). There were 1,703 housing units at an average density of 393.3 per square mile (151.9/km^{2}). The racial makeup of the city was 73.29% White, 23.40% Black or African American, 0.77% Native American, 0.33% Asian, 0.05% Pacific Islander, 0.98% from other races, and 1.19% from two or more races. 1.84% of the population were Hispanic or Latino of any race.

There were 1,595 households, out of which 33.4% had children under the living with them, 50.4% were married couples living together, 14.1% had a female householder with no husband present, and 31.5% were non-families. 28.5% of all households were made up of individuals, and 14.9% had someone living alone who was 65 years of age or older. The average household size was 2.53 and the average family size was 3.14.

In the city, the population was spread out, with 26.3% under the, 8.7% from 18 to 24, 25.8% from 25 to 44, 21.5% from 45 to 64, and 17.7% who were 65 years of age or older. The median age was 37 years. For every 100 females, there were 88.4 males. For every 100 females age 18 and over, there were 82.4 males.

The median income for a household in the city was $31,558, and the median income for a family was $44,423. Males had a median income of $34,315 versus $22,642 for females. The per capita income for the city was $15,598. About 11.9% of families and 15.0% of the population were below the poverty line, including 16.6% of those under age 18 and 19.5% of those age 65 or over.

== Notable people ==
- Maurice Britt (1919–1995), football player, businessman, and decorated soldier; raised in Lonoke
- Ed Hamm (1906–1982), track and field athlete, gold medal winner 1928 Summer Olympics
- Jim Lee Howell (1914–1995), football player (NY Giants 1937–1947) and coach
- Paula Jones (1966–), Arkansas state employee who sued Bill Clinton for sexual harassment
- James B. Reed (1881–1935), U.S. representative from 1923 to 1929
- Joseph Taylor Robinson (1872–1937), U.S. Senate Majority leader and Al Smith's running mate
- Thomas Clark Trimble III (1878–1965), former federal judge
- Will Walls (1912–1993), American football player
- Casey Martin (baseball) (1999–), baseball player

== See also ==
- List of cities and towns in Arkansas
- National Register of Historic Places listings in Lonoke County, Arkansas
