= National Register of Historic Places listings in Monroe County, Arkansas =

Location of Monroe County in Arkansas

This is a list of the National Register of Historic Places listings in Monroe County, Arkansas.

This is intended to be a complete list of the properties and districts on the National Register of Historic Places in Monroe County, Arkansas, United States. The locations of National Register properties and districts for which the latitude and longitude coordinates are included below, may be seen in a map.

There are 41 properties and districts listed on the National Register in the county, including 1 National Historic Landmark. Another three properties were once listed but have been removed.

Contents: Counties in Arkansas
- Arkansas
- Ashley
- Baxter
- Benton
- Boone
- Bradley
- Calhoun
- Carroll
- Chicot
- Clark
- Clay
- Cleburne
- Cleveland
- Columbia
- Conway
- Craighead
- Crawford
- Crittenden
- Cross
- Dallas
- Desha
- Drew
- Faulkner
- Franklin
- Fulton
- Garland
- Grant
- Greene
- Hempstead
- Hot Spring
- Howard
- Independence
- Izard
- Jackson
- Jefferson
- Johnson
- Lafayette
- Lawrence
- Lee
- Lincoln
- Little River
- Logan
- Lonoke
- Madison
- Marion
- Miller
- Mississippi
- Monroe
- Montgomery
- Nevada
- Newton
- Ouachita
- Perry
- Phillips
- Pike
- Poinsett
- Polk
- Pope
- Prairie
- Pulaski (Little Rock)
- Randolph
- St. Francis
- Saline
- Scott
- Searcy
- Sebastian
- Sevier
- Sharp
- Stone
- Union
- Van Buren
- Washington
- White
- Woodruff
- Yell

This National Park Service list is complete through NPS recent listings posted December 19, 2025.

== Current listings ==
	Name on the Register	Image	Date listed	Location	City or town	Description
1	Abramson House	Abramson House	September 7, 1995 (#95001092)	127 Crescent Heights; 34°35′29″N 91°11′52″W	Holly Grove	
2	Anderson Boarding House		November 1, 1984 (#84000180)	201 Main St. 34°41′44″N 91°19′00″W	Clarendon	Demolished
3	Bank of Clarendon	Bank of Clarendon	November 1, 1984 (#84000183)	125 Court St. 34°41′47″N 91°19′07″W	Clarendon	
4	Bateman-Griffith House	Bateman-Griffith House	November 1, 1984 (#84000184)	316 Jefferson St. 34°41′56″N 91°18′59″W	Clarendon	
5	Baytown Site	Baytown Site	May 13, 1976 (#76000440)	Southeastern quarter of the southwestern quarter of Section 2345, Section 2 South, Range 1 West; 34°22′57″N 91°03′54″W	Indian Bay	
6	William Black Family House	William Black Family House	December 12, 1976 (#76000437)	311 W. Ash St. 34°53′07″N 91°11′44″W	Brinkley	
7	Bondi Brothers Store	Bondi Brothers Store	November 1, 1984 (#84000185)	104 Madison St. 34°41′45″N 91°19′03″W	Clarendon	
8	Bounds Building		November 1, 1984 (#84000186)	105 2nd St. 34°41′47″N 91°19′02″W	Clarendon	No longer standing.
9	Brinkley Concrete Streets	Brinkley Concrete Streets	January 24, 2017 (#100000555)	Ash St, between Main St. & New York Ave. & New York Ave. between Ash & Lynn Sts. 34°52′59″N 91°11′47″W	Brinkley	
10	Capps House	Capps House	June 21, 1990 (#90000877)	County Road 48 east of its junction with Highway 17; 34°30′04″N 91°07′59″W	Lawrenceville	House has been demolished.
11	Clarendon Methodist-Episcopal Church South	Clarendon Methodist-Episcopal Church South	November 1, 1984 (#84000187)	121 3rd St. 34°41′53″N 91°19′01″W	Clarendon	
12	Cumberland Presbyterian Church	Cumberland Presbyterian Church	July 30, 1976 (#76000438)	120 Washington St. 34°41′42″N 91°18′44″W	Clarendon	
13	Ellas-McKay House		December 8, 1978 (#78000613)	404 N. Wells St. 34°41′45″N 91°18′48″W	Clarendon	Demolished prior to 1997
14	Ewan Building		November 1, 1984 (#84000188)	124-128 2nd St. 34°41′48″N 91°19′06″W	Clarendon	Demolished
15	Fargo Training School Historic District		May 27, 2010 (#10000287)	Floyd Brown Dr., east of M and A Rd. 34°57′04″N 91°10′28″W	Fargo	
16	Orth C. Galloway House	Orth C. Galloway House	May 23, 1980 (#80000779)	504 Park St. 34°42′02″N 91°18′46″W	Clarendon	
17	Gazzola and Vaccaro Building	Gazzola and Vaccaro Building	December 22, 1982 (#82000865)	131-133 W. Cypress; 34°53′14″N 91°11′34″W	Brinkley	
18	Goldman and Son Store		November 1, 1984 (#84000189)	101 Main St. 34°41′44″N 91°19′05″W	Clarendon	Demolished
19	Holly Grove Historic District	Holly Grove Historic District	February 2, 1979 (#79000446)	Main and Pine Sts. 34°35′44″N 91°12′03″W	Holly Grove	
20	Holly Grove Presbyterian Church	Holly Grove Presbyterian Church	May 13, 1991 (#91000581)	310 2nd St. 34°35′46″N 91°11′53″W	Holly Grove	
21	Jefferies Building		November 1, 1984 (#84000191)	122 Madison St. 34°41′43″N 91°19′03″W	Clarendon	Demolished
22	Jefferies-Crabtree House	Jefferies-Crabtree House	November 1, 1984 (#84000192)	300 Jefferson St. 34°41′55″N 91°18′59″W	Clarendon	Mistakenly listed as "Jefferies-Craptree House" in the NRIS
23	Lair House	Lair House	April 23, 1998 (#98000371)	Junction of Stone and Elm Sts. 34°35′43″N 91°11′46″W	Holly Grove	
24	Lick Skillet Railroad Work Station Historic District	Lick Skillet Railroad Work Station Historic District	June 1, 1992 (#92000558)	Junction of E. Cypress St. and New Orleans Ave. 34°53′16″N 91°11′30″W	Brinkley	
25	Lo Beele House	Lo Beele House	December 22, 1982 (#82000866)	312 New York Ave. 34°53′23″N 91°11′47″W	Brinkley	
26	Louisiana Purchase Survey Marker	Louisiana Purchase Survey Marker	February 23, 1972 (#72000206)	Southeast of Blackton at the corner of Monroe and Phillips counties 34°38′48″N 91°03′05″W	Blackton	Extends into Lee and Phillips counties
27	Manning, Lee and Moore Law Office	Manning, Lee and Moore Law Office	November 1, 1984 (#84000193)	109 Court St. 34°41′46″N 91°19′07″W	Clarendon	
28	Marston House	Marston House	November 1, 1984 (#84000194)	429 Main St. 34°41′44″N 91°18′44″W	Clarendon	
29	Memphis to Little Rock Road-Henard Cemetery Road Segment		May 30, 2003 (#03000470)	Henard Cemetery Rd. 34°59′22″N 91°09′13″W	Zent	Segment of the Trail of Tears
30	Merchants and Planters Bank	Merchants and Planters Bank	December 22, 1982 (#82000867)	214 Madison; 34°41′35″N 91°18′49″W	Clarendon	
31	Midland Depot	Midland Depot	November 1, 1984 (#84000195)	205 Midland St. 34°41′16″N 91°18′36″W	Clarendon	
32	Monroe County Bank Building	Monroe County Bank Building	January 26, 2016 (#15000995)	225-227 W. Cypress Sts. 34°41′33″N 91°18′51″W	Brinkley	
33	Monroe County Courthouse	Monroe County Courthouse	October 14, 1976 (#76000439)	Courthouse Sq. 34°41′33″N 91°18′51″W	Clarendon	
34	Moore-Jacobs House	Moore-Jacobs House	September 29, 1983 (#83001160)	500 N. Main St. 34°41′52″N 91°18′49″W	Clarendon	
35	Mount Zion Missionary Baptist Church	Mount Zion Missionary Baptist Church	November 4, 1986 (#86002951)	409 S. Main St. 34°52′56″N 91°11′39″W	Brinkley	
36	New South Inn		November 1, 1984 (#84000196)	132-164 2nd St. 34°41′15″N 91°18′29″W	Clarendon	No longer standing
37	Rusher Hotel	Rusher Hotel	July 18, 1986 (#86001664)	127 W. Cedar; 34°53′15″N 91°11′32″W	Brinkley	
38	St. John the Baptist Catholic Church	St. John the Baptist Catholic Church	October 2, 1992 (#92001283)	Southwestern corner of the junction of New Orleans and W. Ash St. 34°53′07″N 91°11′35″W	Brinkley	
39	United States Post Office	United States Post Office	February 23, 2022 (#100006925)	201 North Main St. 34°53′18″N 91°11′41″W	Brinkley	
40	James A. Walls House	James A. Walls House	June 9, 1980 (#80000780)	Off Highway 17; 34°35′45″N 91°11′38″W	Holly Grove	
41	Ellis and Charlotte Williamson House		February 3, 2020 (#100004944)	126 West Cloverdale Dr. 34°53′55″N 91°12′03″W	Brinkley	

== Former listings ==
	Name on the Register	Image	Date listed	Date removed	Location	City or town	Description
1	Highway 79 Bridge	Highway 79 Bridge	November 1, 1984 (#84000190, 15000629)	September 8, 2020	U.S. Route 79 over the White River; 34°41′22″N 91°19′01″W	Clarendon	Boundary increase September 28, 2015. Demolished in 2019.
2	Monroe County Jail		April 11, 1977 (#77000262)	August 11, 1999	2nd and Kendall	Clarendon	
3	Palmer House	Palmer House	May 4, 1976 (#76000436)	January 22, 2014	Southeast of Blackton off U.S. Route 49; 34°38′12″N 91°04′22″W	Blackton	Destroyed by fire

== See also ==
- List of National Historic Landmarks in Arkansas
- National Register of Historic Places listings in Arkansas
