= Bounds Building =

- U.S. National Register of Historic Places
- Location within Arkansas Location within the United States
- Location: 105 Second St., Clarendon, Arkansas
- Coordinates: 34°41′47″N 91°19′2″W
- Area: less than one acre
- Built: 1917
- MPS: Clarendon MRA
- NRHP reference No.: 84000186
- Added to NRHP: November 1, 1984

The Bounds Building was a historic commercial building at 105 Second Street in Clarendon, Arkansas. It was a single-story brick building, with a flat roof, and a brick parapet over its storefront, which consisted of a pair of wood-and-glass doors flanked by plate glass windows. Built in 1917, it was the only building to survive the city's major building boom of 1910–20 with its storefront intact. It was built by John Bounds, a clerk in a dry goods store who eventually opened his own.

The building was listed on the National Register of Historic Places in 1984. It has been listed as demolished in the state's cultural inventory database.

== See also ==
- National Register of Historic Places listings in Monroe County, Arkansas
