= Anderson Boarding House =

Historic residential building in Arkansas, United States

- U.S. National Register of Historic Places
- Location within Arkansas Location within the United States
- Location: 201 North Main Street, Clarendon, Arkansas
- Coordinates: 34°41′44″N 91°19′0″W
- Area: less than one acre
- Built: 1921
- Architectural style: Bungalow/Craftsman
- MPS: Clarendon MRA
- NRHP reference No.: 84000180
- Added to NRHP: November 1, 1984

The Anderson Boarding House is a historic boarding house at 201 North Main Street in Clarendon, Arkansas.

== Description and history ==
Built in 1921, it is one of the city's finest examples of Craftsman architecture, with a projecting front porch, and exposed rafter ends. It is the only known building in the city that was purpose-built as a boarding house, with a first floor layout that has three rooms on each side of a narrow hall, and a dining hall at the rear.

The house was listed on the National Register of Historic Places on November 1, 1984. It may have been demolished.

== See also ==
- National Register of Historic Places listings in Monroe County, Arkansas
