= Ewan Building =

- U.S. National Register of Historic Places
- Location within Arkansas Location within the United States
- Location: 124-128 Second St., Clarendon, Arkansas
- Coordinates: 34°41′48″N 91°19′6″W
- Area: less than one acre
- Built: 1903
- MPS: Clarendon MRA
- NRHP reference No.: 84000188
- Added to NRHP: November 1, 1984

The Ewan Building is a historic commercial building at 124-128 Second Street in Clarendon, Arkansas. It is a single-story brick structure, with three storefronts demarcated by a metal pilasters and a pressed-metal facade. Built in 1904, it is one several buildings built on the block with a metal facade, giving the entire block a distinctive character. This area was used as a backdrop in the filming of A Soldier's Story.

The building was listed on the National Register of Historic Places in 1984.

== See also ==
- National Register of Historic Places listings in Monroe County, Arkansas
