= Bank of Clarendon =

- U.S. National Register of Historic Places
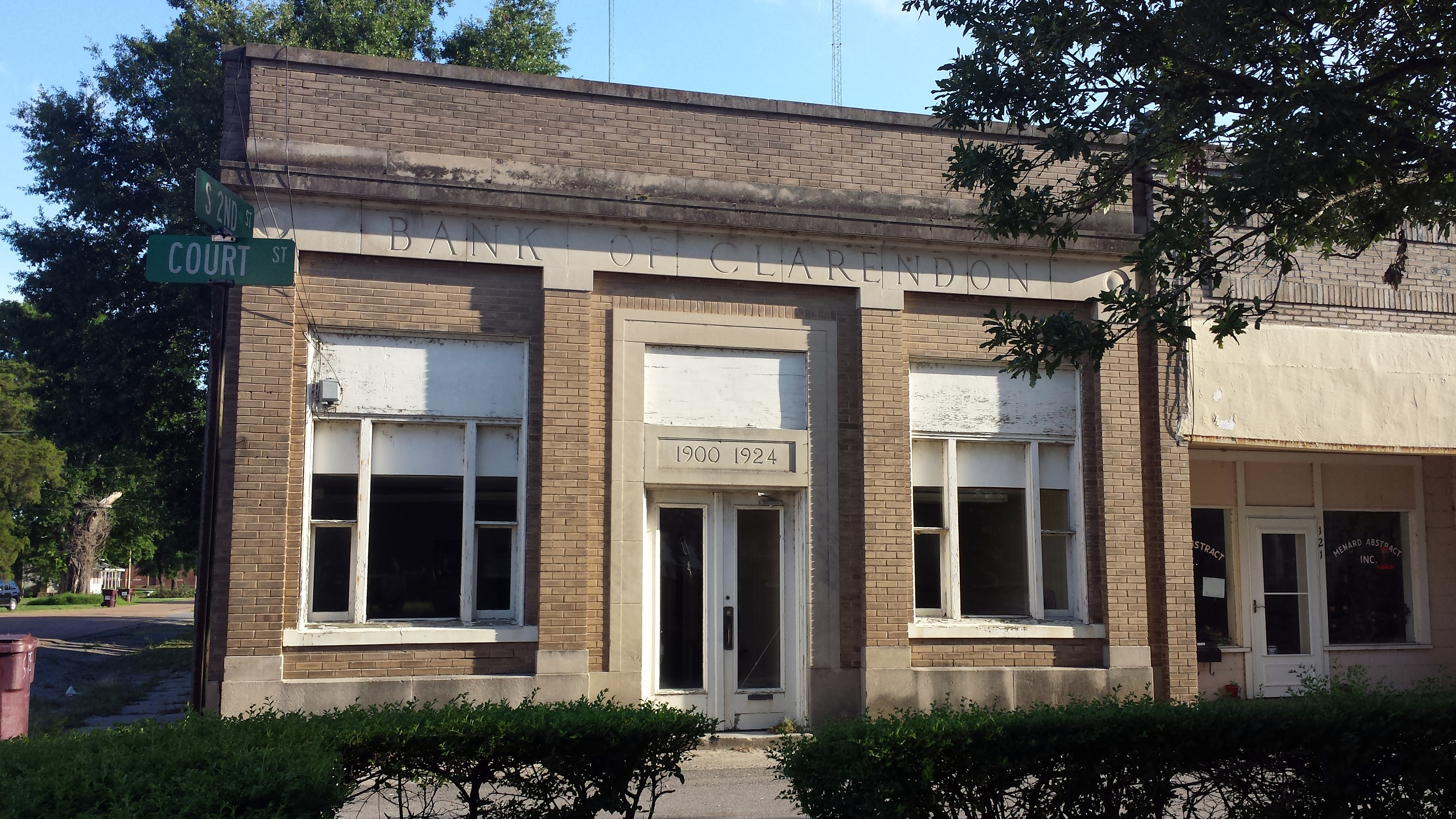

- Location within Arkansas Location within the United States
- Location: 125 Court St., Clarendon, Arkansas
- Coordinates: 34°41′47″N 91°19′7″W
- Area: less than one acre
- Built: 1924
- MPS: Clarendon MRA
- NRHP reference No.: 84000183
- Added to NRHP: November 1, 1984

The Bank of Clarendon is a historic commercial building at 125 Court Street in Clarendon, Arkansas. It is a modest single-story buff-colored brick building with Classical Revival features. Its three-bay front facade is articulated by brick pilasters, with tripartite windows flanking the entrance. The Bank of Clarendon was first organized in 1900, and had this building constructed in 1924. The bank failed in the 1930s and was taken over by another bank. The building has since been home to a variety of retail operations, and is presently vacant.

The building was listed on the National Register of Historic Places in 1984. It was listed as an endangered property in 2015 by an Arkansas historic preservation organization.

== See also ==
- National Register of Historic Places listings in Monroe County, Arkansas
