= Clarendon station (Arkansas) =

- Midland Depot
- U.S. National Register of Historic Places
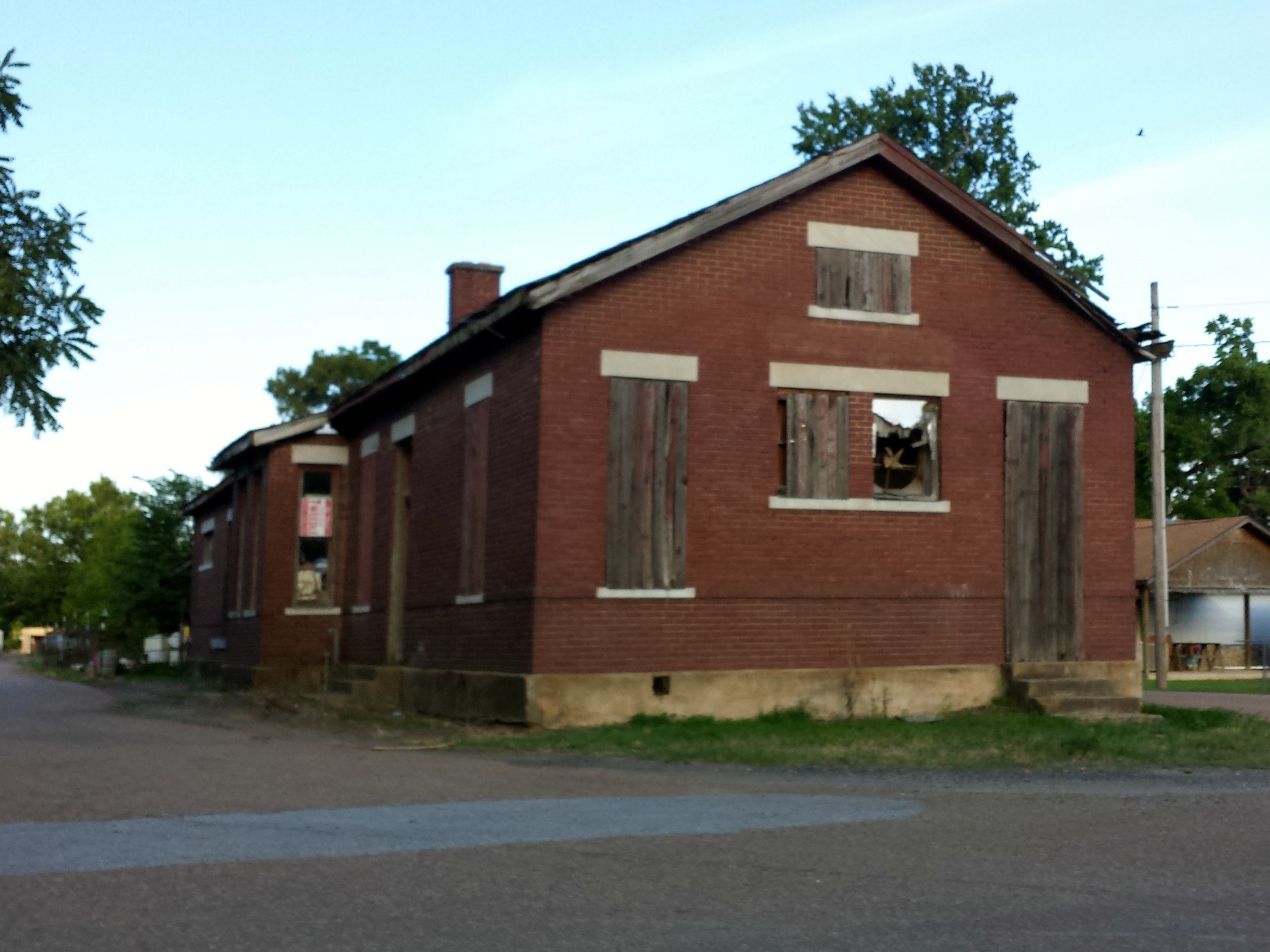

- Location within Arkansas Location within the United States
- Location: 205 Midland St., Clarendon, Arkansas
- Coordinates: 34°41′16″N 91°18′36″W
- Area: less than one acre
- Built: 1912
- Architect: Arkansas Midland Railroad
- MPS: Clarendon MRA
- NRHP reference No.: 84000195
- Added to NRHP: November 1, 1984

The Midland Depot is a historic railroad station at 205 Midland Street in Clarendon, Arkansas. It is a modest single-story brick building, built about 1912 by the Arkansas Midland Railroad, a short-lived short-run railroad connecting Little Rock and Helena. The station was abandoned in 1917 when the tracks were removed, and has since seen a variety of commercial uses.

The station was listed on the National Register of Historic Places in 1984.

== See also ==
- National Register of Historic Places listings in Monroe County, Arkansas
