= Clarendon Methodist-Episcopal Church South =

Historic church in Arkansas, United States

- U.S. National Register of Historic Places
- Location within Arkansas Location within the United States
- Location: 121 Third St., Clarendon, Arkansas
- Coordinates: 34°41′53″N 91°19′1″W
- Area: less than one acre
- Built: 1912
- Architect: John Gaisford
- Architectural style: Classical Revival
- MPS: Clarendon MRA
- NRHP reference No.: 84000187
- Added to NRHP: November 1, 1984

The Clarendon Methodist-Episcopal Church South is a historic church at 121 Third Street in Clarendon, Arkansas. It is a two-story brick structure with a cross-gable configuration, that has a dome at the crossing point of the gables. Single-story classroom and office wings flank the main block. The church was built in 1912, and was designed by John Gaisford, who produced a number of designs for Episcopal Church South congregations between 1905 and 1918. It is one of Clarendon's oldest church buildings, and one of its most impressive Classical Revival structures.

The building was listed on the National Register of Historic Places in 1984.

== See also ==
- National Register of Historic Places listings in Monroe County, Arkansas
