= Bondi Brothers Store =

- U.S. National Register of Historic Places
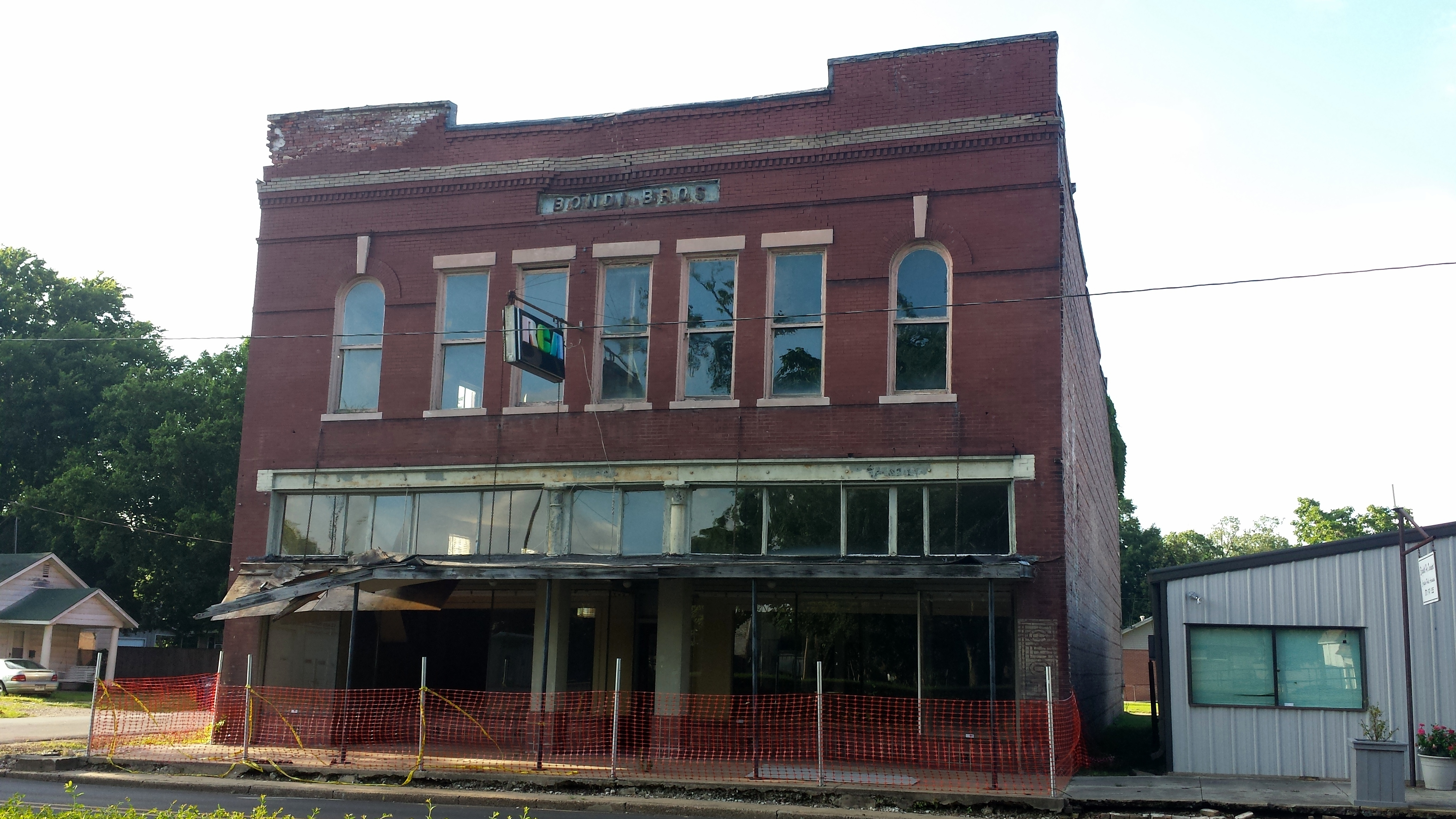

- Location within Arkansas Location within the United States
- Location: 104 Madison St., Clarendon, Arkansas
- Coordinates: 34°41′45″N 91°19′3″W
- Area: less than one acre
- Built: 1904
- MPS: Clarendon MRA
- NRHP reference No.: 84000185
- Added to NRHP: November 1, 1984

The Bondi Brothers Store is a historic commercial building at 104 Madison Street in downtown Clarendon, Arkansas. It is a two-story brick building, with modest Italianate styling. Its storefront has been altered to have plate glass over much of the front, but the recessed entrance remains, with an original transom window. The store was built in 1904 by Ike and Ed Bondi, sons of German immigrants who established a successful clothing store.

The building was listed on the National Register of Historic Places in 1984.

== See also ==
- National Register of Historic Places listings in Monroe County, Arkansas
