= New South Inn =

- U.S. National Register of Historic Places
- Location within Arkansas Location within the United States
- Location: 132-164 Second St., Clarendon, Arkansas
- Coordinates: 34°41′15″N 91°18′29″W
- Area: less than one acre
- Built: 1903
- MPS: Clarendon MRA
- NRHP reference No.: 84000196
- Added to NRHP: November 1, 1984

The New South Inn is a historic hotel building at 132-164 Second Street in Clarendon, Arkansas. Built in about 1902, it is the only surviving historic hotel in the city, and is notable for its well-preserved pressed metal facade. Its main facade is divided into five storefronts. The facade above the second floor has an elaborately decorated cornice with modillions and panels.

The building was listed on the National Register of Historic Places in 1984.

== See also ==
- National Register of Historic Places listings in Monroe County, Arkansas
