= McKay House =

McKay House may refer to:

- McKay House (Owenton, Kentucky), listed on the NRHP in Owen County, Kentucky
- Ellas-McKay House, Clarendon, Arkansas, listed on the NRHP in Monroe County, Arkansas
- McKay-Thornberry House, Owensboro, Kentucky, listed on the NRHP in Daviess County, Kentucky
- Donald McKay House, Boston, Massachusetts, listed on the NRHP in Boston, Massachusetts
- Strawberry Patch-McKay House, Madison, Mississippi, listed on the NRHP in Madison County, Mississippi
- Claude McKay Residence, New York, New York, listed on the NRHP in New York City
- John A. McKay House and Manufacturing Company, Dunn, North Carolina, listed on the NRHP in Harnett County, North Carolina
- Summer Villa and the McKay-Salmon House, Lillington, North Carolina, listed on the NRHP in Harnett County, North Carolina
- Moses McKay House, Waynesville, Ohio, listed on the NRHP in Warren County, Ohio
