= Cumberland Presbyterian Church (Clarendon, Arkansas) =

Historic church in Arkansas, United States

- U.S. National Register of Historic Places
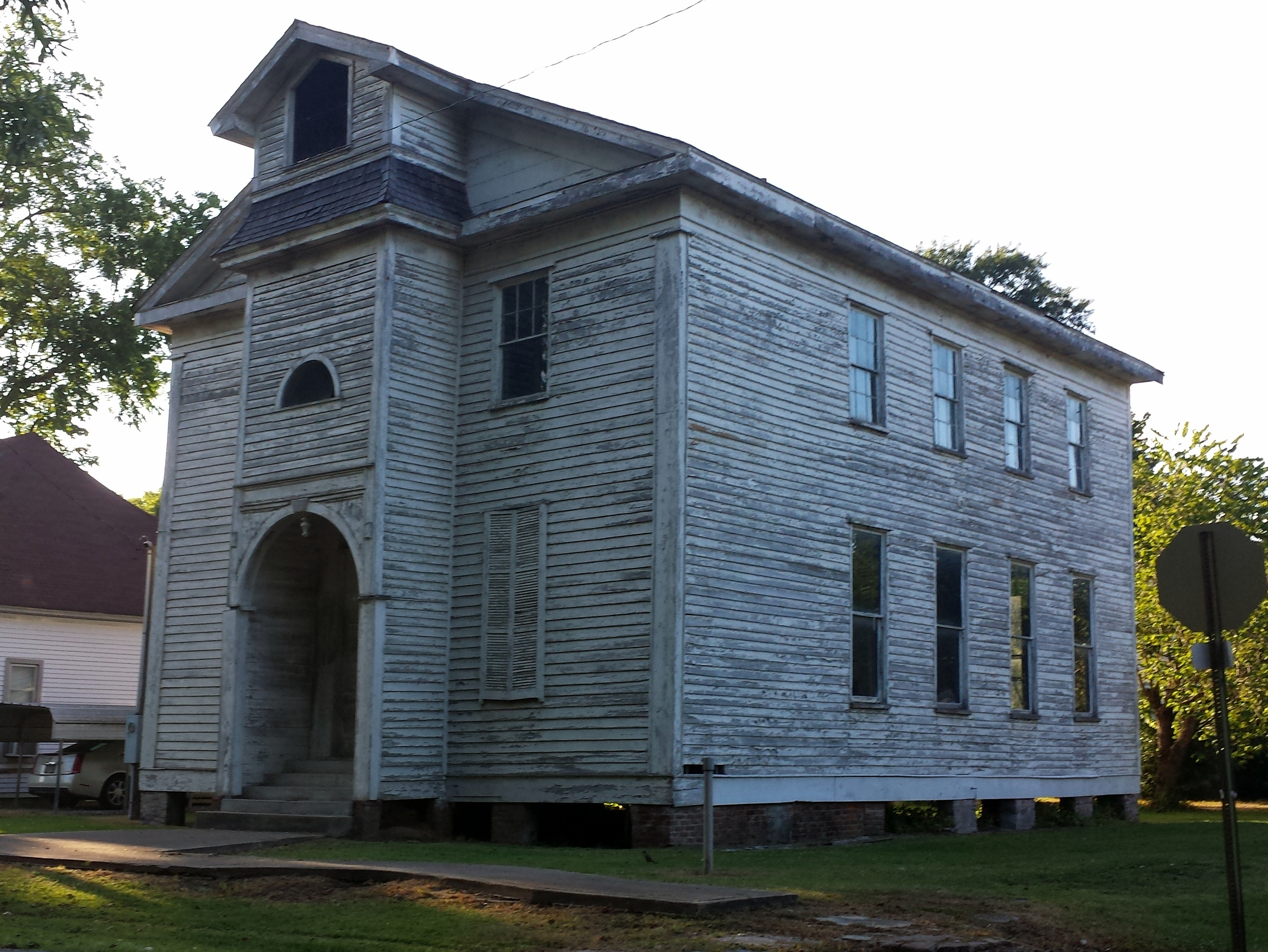

- Location within Arkansas Location within the United States
- Location: 120 Washington St., Clarendon, Arkansas
- Coordinates: 34°41′42″N 91°18′44″W
- Area: less than one acre
- Built: 1869
- Architectural style: Greek Revival
- NRHP reference No.: 76000438
- Added to NRHP: July 30, 1976

The Cumberland Presbyterian Church (also known as the Boy Scout Hall or the Old Masonic Lodge) is a historic church building at 120 Washington Street in Clarendon, Arkansas. It is a modest two-story wood-frame structure with Greek Revival features. It was built in 1869 for a congregation organized in 1857. The entire town of Clarendon was destroyed during the American Civil War, and this was one of the first churches built thereafter. The congregation merged with the First Presbyterian Church in 1920, and the building was taken over by the local Masonic lodge, which used it for its own purposes as well as a community meeting center, and also the local library for a time. In 1968 it was rescued from proposed demolition and given to the local Boy Scout organization.

The building was listed on the National Register of Historic Places in 1976.

== See also ==
- National Register of Historic Places listings in Monroe County, Arkansas
