= Orth C. Galloway House =

Historic house in Arkansas, United States

- U.S. National Register of Historic Places
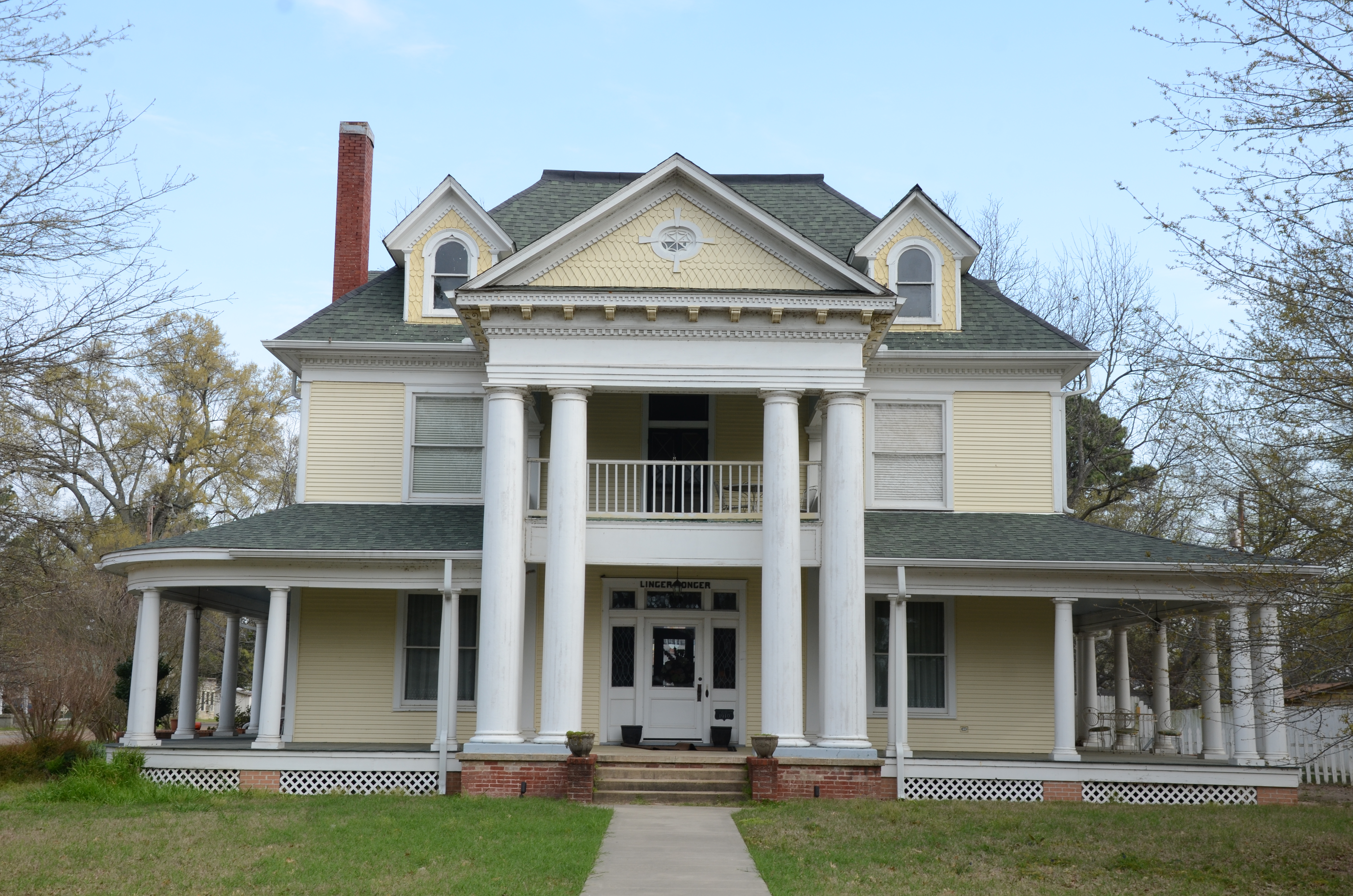

- Location within Arkansas Location within the United States
- Location: 504 Park St., Clarendon, Arkansas
- Coordinates: 34°42′2″N 91°18′46″W
- Area: less than one acre
- Built: 1910
- Architect: George Franklin Barber of Barber & Klutz; Morrison, T.J.
- Architectural style: Colonial Revival, Georgian Revival
- NRHP reference No.: 80000779
- Added to NRHP: May 23, 1980

The Orth C. Galloway House is a historic house at 504 Park Street in Clarendon, Arkansas. It is a 2 1/2-story wood-frame structure, with Colonial Revival styling designed by George Franklin Barber. It was built in 1910 for Orth Galloway, owner of a local lumber mill. Barber's design is of a considerably higher style than was typically found in his pattern-book publications, which were widely used in the southern US. Its most prominent feature is its two-story Classical Revival entrance portico, supported by clustered Doric columns.

The house was listed on the National Register of Historic Places in 1980.

== See also ==
- National Register of Historic Places listings in Monroe County, Arkansas
