= Marston House =

Marston House may refer to:

in England

- Marston House (Somerset), Grade II* listed building in Marston Bigot Park near Frome, Somerset, England

in the United States

(by state then city)

- Collins-Marston House, Mobile, Alabama, listed on the National Register of Historic Places (NRHP)
- Greene-Marston House, Mobile, Alabama, NRHP-listed
- Marston House (Clarendon, Arkansas), listed on the NRHP in Monroe County
- George W. Marston House, San Diego, California, listed on the NRHP in San Diego County
- Burnham-Marston House, San Diego, California, listed on the NRHP in San Diego County
- Marston House (Clinton, Louisiana), listed on the NRHP in East Feliciana Parish
- William Marston House, Barnstable, Massachusetts, listed on the NRHP in Barnstable County
- Arthur R. Hoard House, also known as George P. Marston House, Fort Atkinson, Wisconsin, listed on the NRHP in Jefferson County
