= Goldman and Son Store =

- U.S. National Register of Historic Places
- Location within Arkansas Location within the United States
- Location: 101 Main St., Clarendon, Arkansas
- Coordinates: 34°41′44″N 91°19′5″W
- Area: less than one acre
- Built: 1893
- MPS: Clarendon MRA
- NRHP reference No.: 84000189
- Added to NRHP: November 1, 1984

The Goldman and Son Store is a historic commercial building at 101 Main Street in Clarendon, Arkansas. Built in 1893, this single-story brick building with pressed-metal facade is the oldest commercial building in the city, and the only 19th-century commercial building in active use. It was first used by a dry goods and cotton merchant, and in 1930 converted for use by a fish dealer.

The building was listed on the National Register of Historic Places in 1984.

== See also ==
- National Register of Historic Places listings in Monroe County, Arkansas
