= Moore-Jacobs House =

Historic house in Arkansas, United States

- U.S. National Register of Historic Places
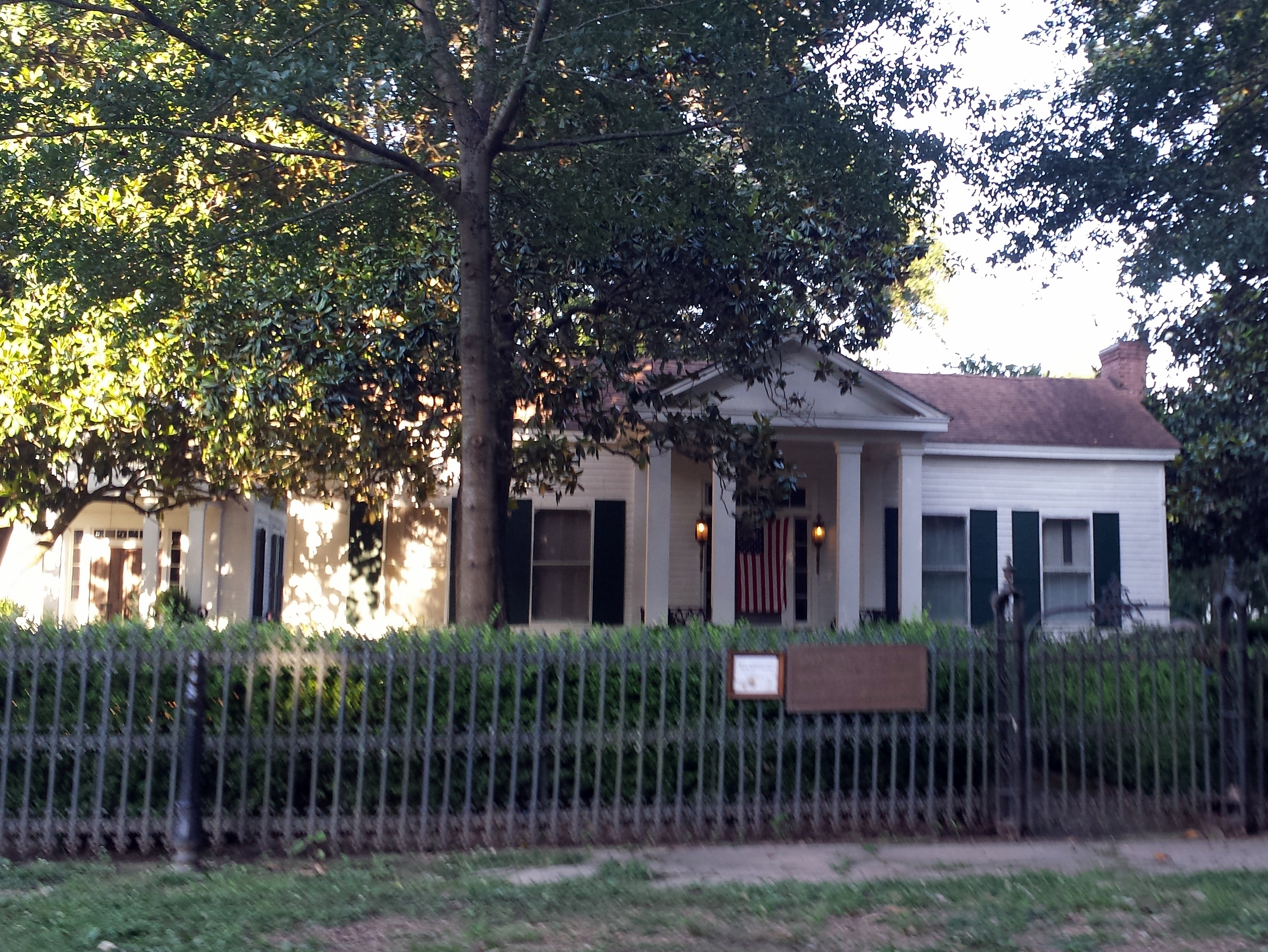

- Location within Arkansas Location within the United States
- Location: 500 N. Main St., Clarendon, Arkansas
- Coordinates: 34°41′52″N 91°18′49″W
- Area: 1 acre (0.40 ha)
- Built: 1870
- Architectural style: Greek Revival
- NRHP reference No.: 83001160
- Added to NRHP: September 29, 1983

The Moore-Jacobs House is a historic house at 500 North Main Street in Clarendon, Arkansas. It is a single-story wood-frame structure, with a side-gable roof and an projecting entry pavilion with a pedimented gable supported by paired square columns. Built in about 1870, this Greek Revival house is a testament to that style's enduring popularity in Arkansas. It was moved across the street from its original location in 1931. It was also for many years home to Margaret Moore-Jacobs, known for her inspirational writings.

The house was listed on the National Register of Historic Places in 1983.

== See also ==
- National Register of Historic Places listings in Monroe County, Arkansas
