= Manning, Lee and Moore Law Office =

- U.S. National Register of Historic Places
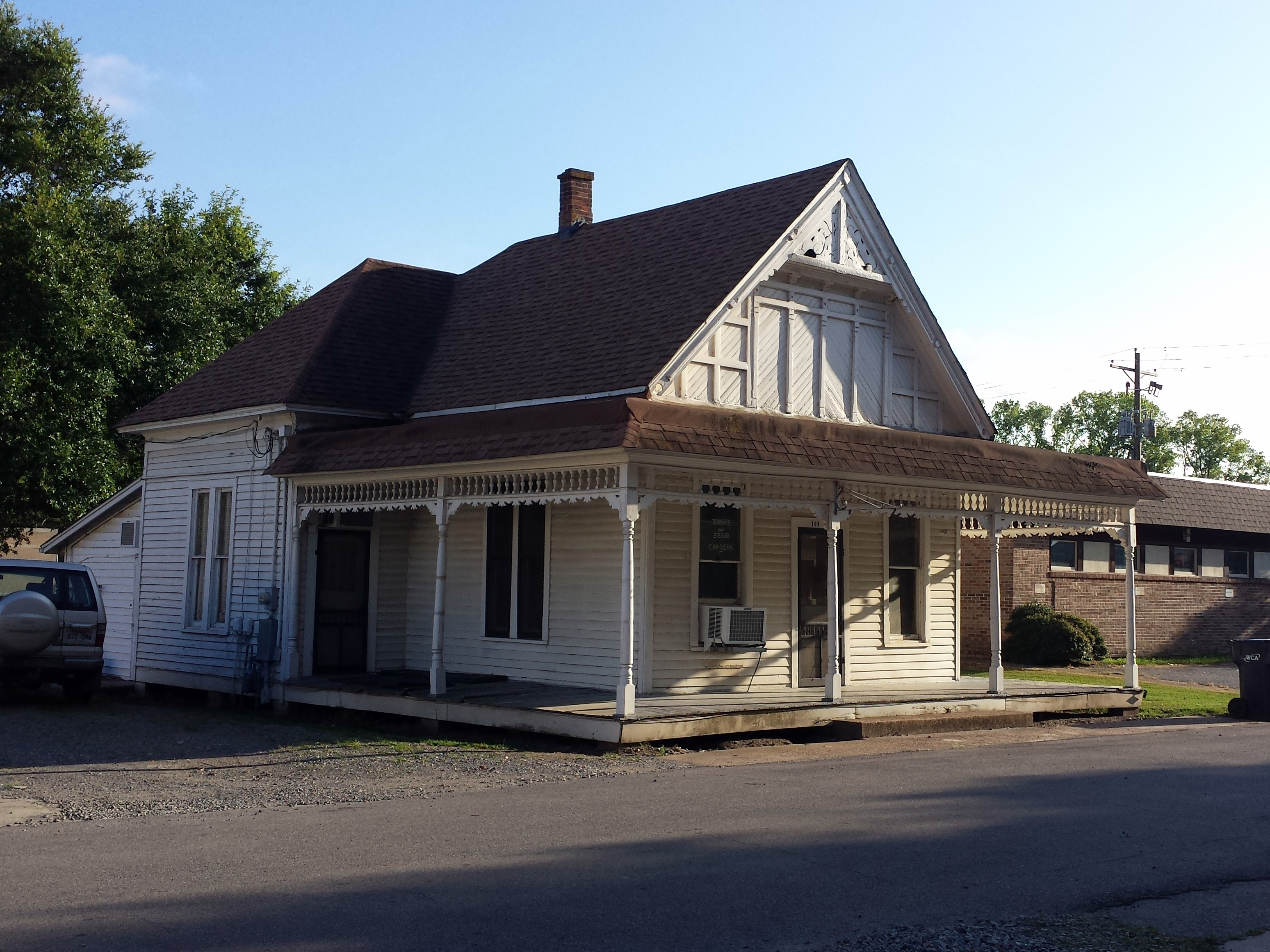

- Location within Arkansas Location within the United States
- Location: 109 Court St., Clarendon, Arkansas
- Coordinates: 34°41′46″N 91°19′7″W
- Area: less than one acre
- Built: 1895
- MPS: Clarendon MRA
- NRHP reference No.: 84000193
- Added to NRHP: November 1, 1984

The Manning, Lee and Moore Law Office is a historic office building at 109 Court Street in Clarendon, Arkansas. Built in 1895, it has served continuously since then as an office building for lawyers. It originally stood on 2nd Street opposite the courthouse, and was moved to its present location in 1899, at which time its rear ell was added. The building features distinctive Queen Anne styling, including a wraparound porch with spindle work and applied Stick style woodwork in the gable.

The building was listed on the National Register of Historic Places in 1984.

== See also ==
- National Register of Historic Places listings in Monroe County, Arkansas
