= Jefferies Building =

- U.S. National Register of Historic Places
- Location within Arkansas Location within the United States
- Location: 122 Madison St., Clarendon, Arkansas
- Coordinates: 34°41′43″N 91°19′3″W
- Area: less than one acre
- Built: 1904
- MPS: Clarendon MRA
- NRHP reference No.: 84000191
- Added to NRHP: November 1, 1984

The Jefferies Building is a historic commercial building at 122 Madison Street in Clarendon, Arkansas. It is a two-story brick building, with a pressed metal facade that has a single storefront with a recessed entrance flanked by display windows. Built about 1904, it initially housed a dry goods store. It is one of Clarendon's few remaining metal-facade commercial buildings.

The building was listed on the National Register of Historic Places in 1984.

== See also ==
- National Register of Historic Places listings in Monroe County, Arkansas
