= Merchants and Planters Bank (Clarendon, Arkansas) =

- U.S. National Register of Historic Places
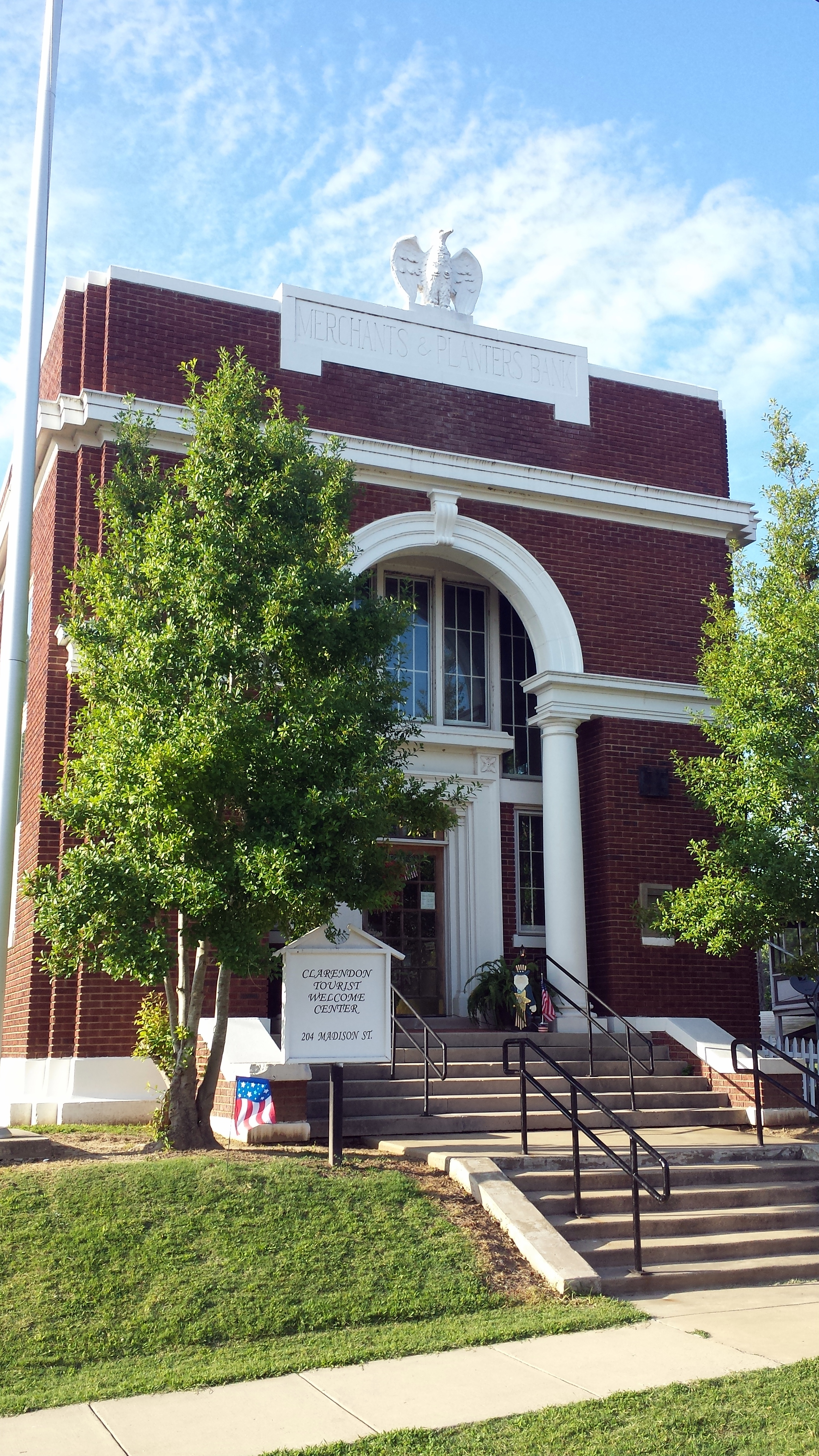

- Location within Arkansas Location within the United States
- Location: 214 Madison, Clarendon, Arkansas
- Coordinates: 34°41′35″N 91°18′49″W
- Area: less than one acre
- Built: 1921
- Architect: Charles L. Thompson
- Architectural style: Classical Revival
- MPS: Thompson, Charles L., Design Collection TR
- NRHP reference No.: 82000867
- Added to NRHP: December 22, 1982

The Merchants and Planters Bank is a historic commercial building at 214 Madison Street in Clarendon, Arkansas. It is a handsome brick two-story building with Classical Revival styling, designed by the Arkansas architect Charles L. Thompson and built in 1921. The main facade has a tall stone arch supported by Tuscan columns, with the main entrance recessed behind. The top of the building has a parapet with a stone panel identifying the building, which has a stone eagle mounted on it.

The building was listed on the National Register of Historic Places in 1982.

== See also ==
- National Register of Historic Places listings in Monroe County, Arkansas
