= Highway 79 Bridge =

- Formerly listed on the U.S. National Register of Historic Places
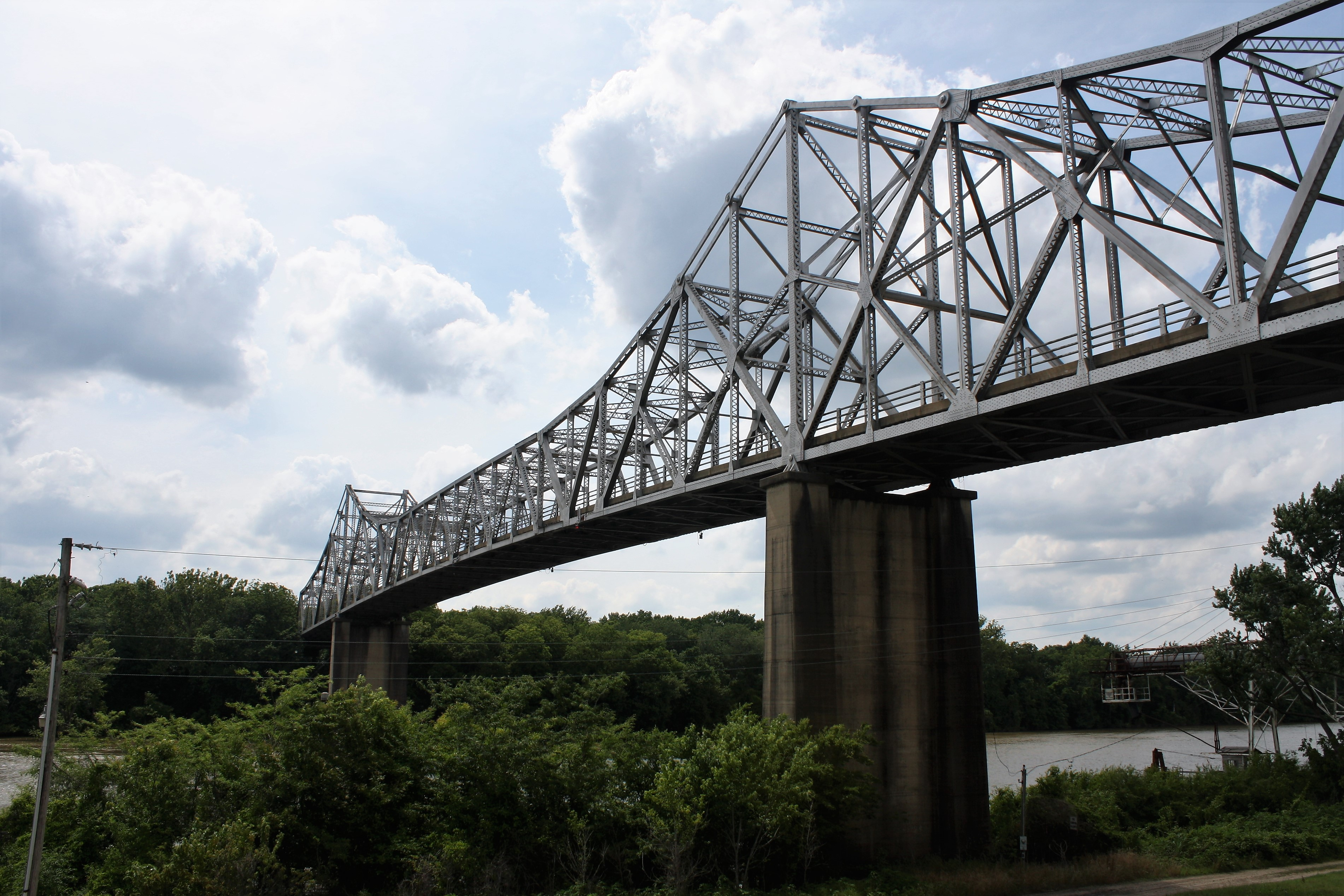

- Location within Arkansas Location within the United States
- Location: US 79 and White River, Clarendon, Arkansas
- Coordinates: 34°41′20″N 91°18′59″W
- Area: less than one acre
- Built: 1930
- Architect: Multiple
- Architectural style: Warren truss
- Demolished: November 2019
- MPS: Clarendon MRA
- NRHP reference No.: 84000190 (original); 15000629 (increase)

Significant dates
- Added to NRHP: November 1, 1984
- Boundary increase: September 28, 2015
- Removed from NRHP: September 8, 2020

The Highway 79 Bridge was a historic bridge in Clarendon, Arkansas, United States. It was a tall two-span Warren truss bridge, formerly carrying two-lane U.S. Route 79 (US 79), a major arterial highway in the region, across the White River just west of the city's downtown. The steel truss had a total length of 720 feet (220 m), set on four concrete piers. The outer pairs of piers were 160 feet (49 m) apart, and the middle pair were 400 feet (120 m) apart. The approaches were concrete, set on concrete pilings, with the western approach continuing for some 3 miles (4.8 km) across secondary water bodies. The bridge was built in 1930–31 by the Austin Bridge Company.

The bridge was listed on the National Register of Historic Places in 1984, and was closed in August 2016 when a replacement bridge to the south opened. Since its closing, the 1931 bridge has been subject to local restoration efforts as a bike and pedestrian path. The steel truss of the bridge was demolished using explosives on November 19, 2019, and was removed from the National Register in 2020.

== Gallery ==
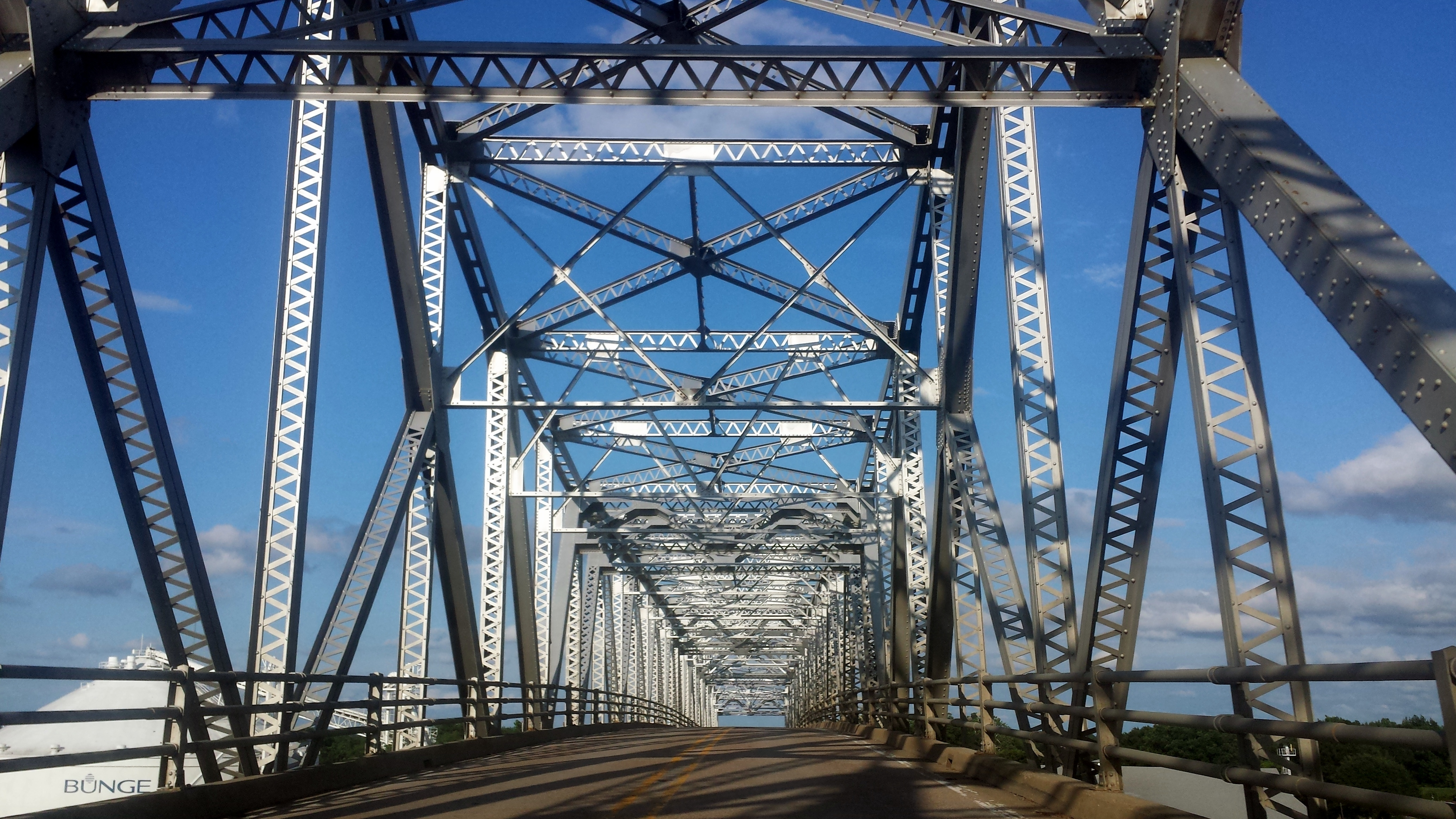

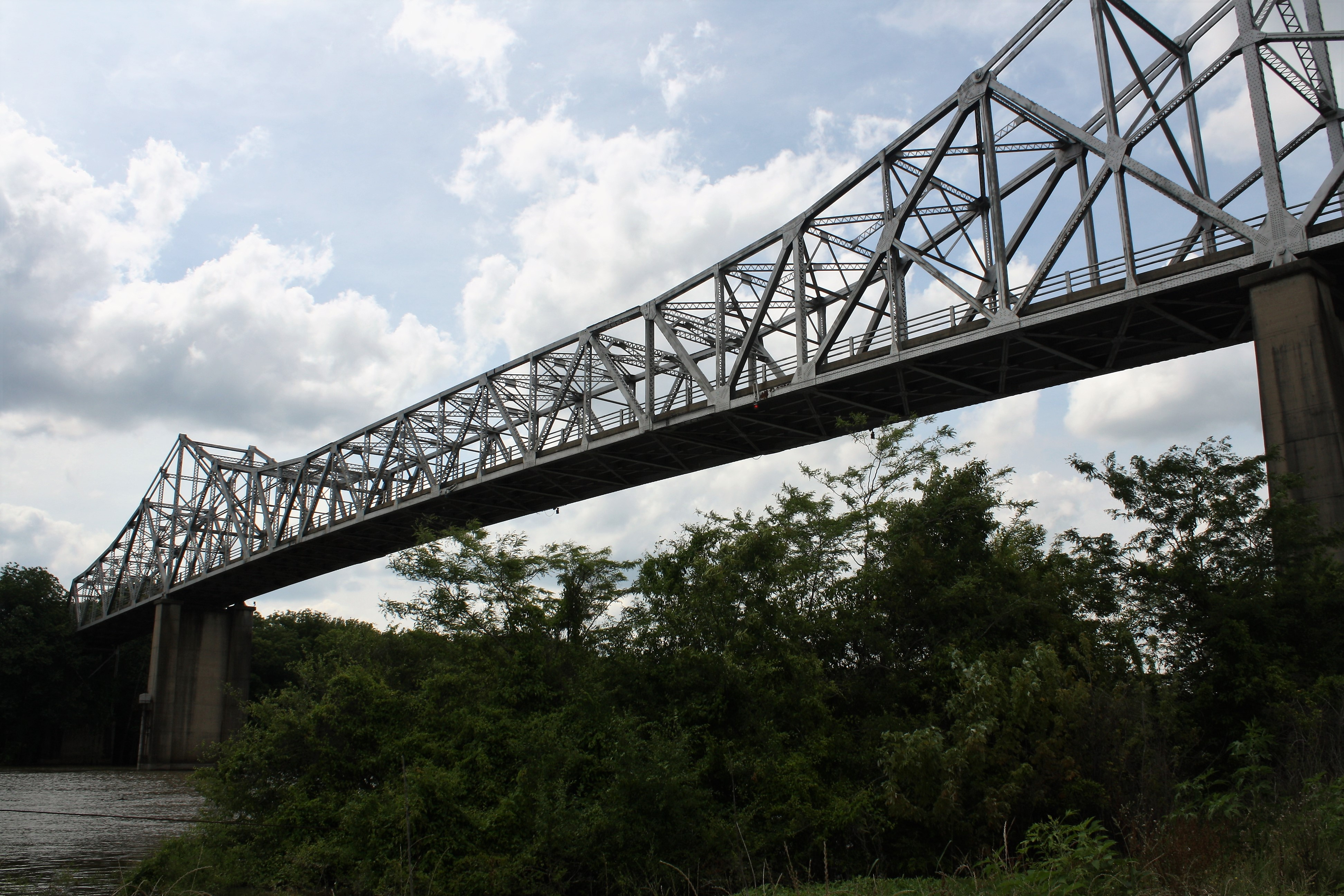

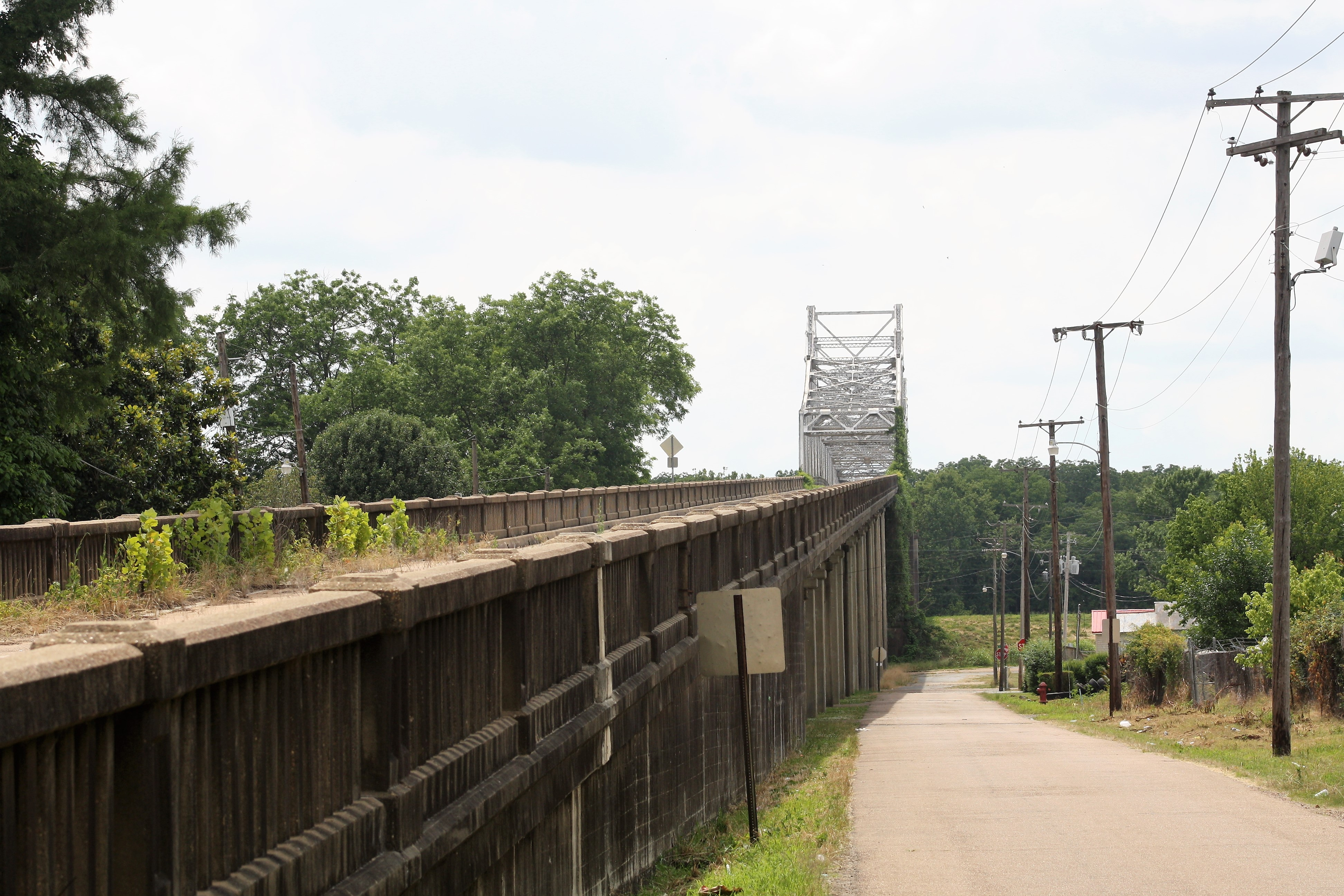

== See also ==
- List of bridges documented by the Historic American Engineering Record in Arkansas
- List of bridges on the National Register of Historic Places in Arkansas
- National Register of Historic Places listings in Monroe County, Arkansas
