= Mount Zion Missionary Baptist Church (Brinkley, Arkansas) =

Historic church in Arkansas, United States

- U.S. National Register of Historic Places
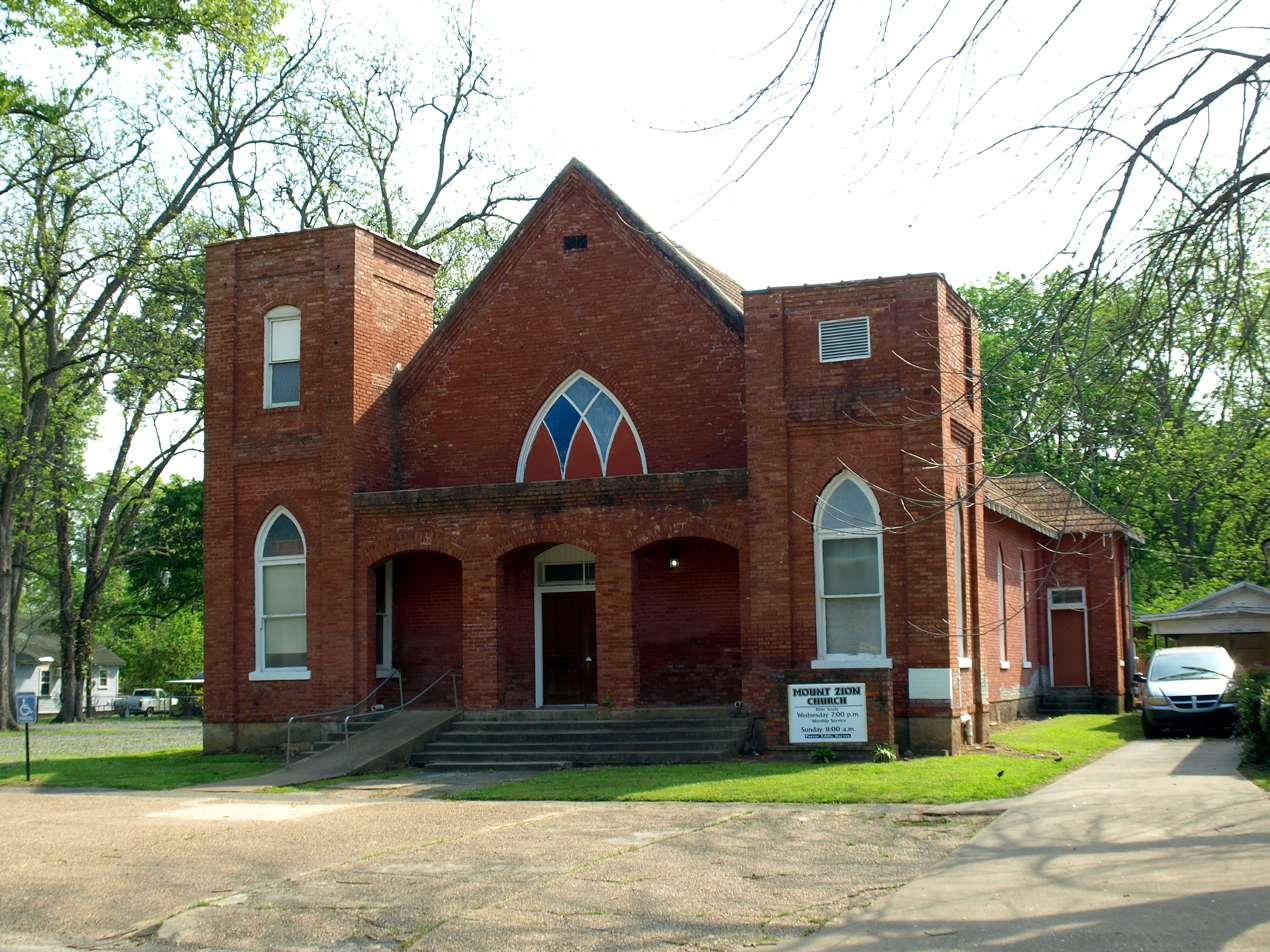
- The church in April 2017

- Location within Arkansas Location within the United States
- Location: 409 S. Main St., Brinkley, Arkansas
- Coordinates: 34°52′56″N 91°11′39″W
- Area: less than one acre
- Built: 1909
- Built by: C.A. Gettis
- Architect: C.A. Gettis
- NRHP reference No.: 86002951
- Added to NRHP: November 4, 1986

Mount Zion Missionary Baptist Church is a historic church at 409 S. Main Street in Brinkley, Arkansas. It is a red brick building with front facing gable roof, and a pair of square towers flanking the main structure. The left tower is slightly taller, an intentional element of the design that was maintained when one tower had to be shortened by removing of its belfry. The towers are joined by a three-bay porch sheltering the building's main entrance. The church was built in 1909 for an African-American congregation established in 1886, and has been a major cultural focus for that community since.

The building was listed on the National Register of Historic Places in 1986.

== See also ==
- National Register of Historic Places listings in Monroe County, Arkansas
