= Capps House =

Historic house in Arkansas, United States

- U.S. National Register of Historic Places
- Location within Arkansas Location within the United States
- Nearest city: Lawrenceville, Arkansas
- Coordinates: 34°30′4″N 91°7′59″W
- Area: 3 acres (1.2 ha)
- Built: 1875
- Architectural style: Vernacular single-pile, I-house, Central hall plan
- NRHP reference No.: 90000877
- Added to NRHP: June 21, 1990

The Capps House is a historic house in rural Monroe County, Arkansas. It is located in the southern part of the county, just east of Arkansas Highway 17 on the north side of County Road 48 (New Cutts Road).

== Description and history ==
It is a two-story brick I-house, oriented east–west. A porch across its front facade was reported in 1990 to be collapsed, while the northern porch retained original chamfered posts, despite having been screened. The property includes as outbuildings a small pumphouse and a barn, and includes the family cemetery of William T. Capps, who built this house around 1875. It is one of the best-preserved 19th-century I-houses in this part of the county.

The house was listed on the National Register of Historic Places on June 21, 1990.

== See also ==
- National Register of Historic Places listings in Monroe County, Arkansas
