= Ellas-McKay House =

Historic house in Arkansas, United States

- U.S. National Register of Historic Places
- Location within Arkansas Location within the United States
- Location: 404 N. Wells St., Clarendon, Arkansas
- Coordinates: 34°41′45″N 91°18′48″W
- Area: less than one acre
- Built: 1908
- Built by: T.S. Ellas
- Architectural style: Queen Anne/ Queen Anne Eastlake
- NRHP reference No.: 78000613
- Added to NRHP: December 8, 1978

The Ellas-McKay House is a historic house at 404 North Wells Street in Clarendon, Arkansas. It is a two-story wood-frame structure, with a hip roof and the irregular and asymmetrical massing typical of the Queen Anne period. The left side of the front facade has a clipped-gable projection, while the right side has a semi-circular porch with an engaged gable dormer above. Both of these gables have decorative barge-board. The house was built in 1908 by T. S. Ellas, a prominent local builder, for his own family. In 1948 it was acquired by R. J. McKay, a prominent local civic leader.

The house was listed on the National Register of Historic Places in 1978.

== See also ==
- National Register of Historic Places listings in Monroe County, Arkansas
