= Brinkley Concrete Streets =

- U.S. National Register of Historic Places
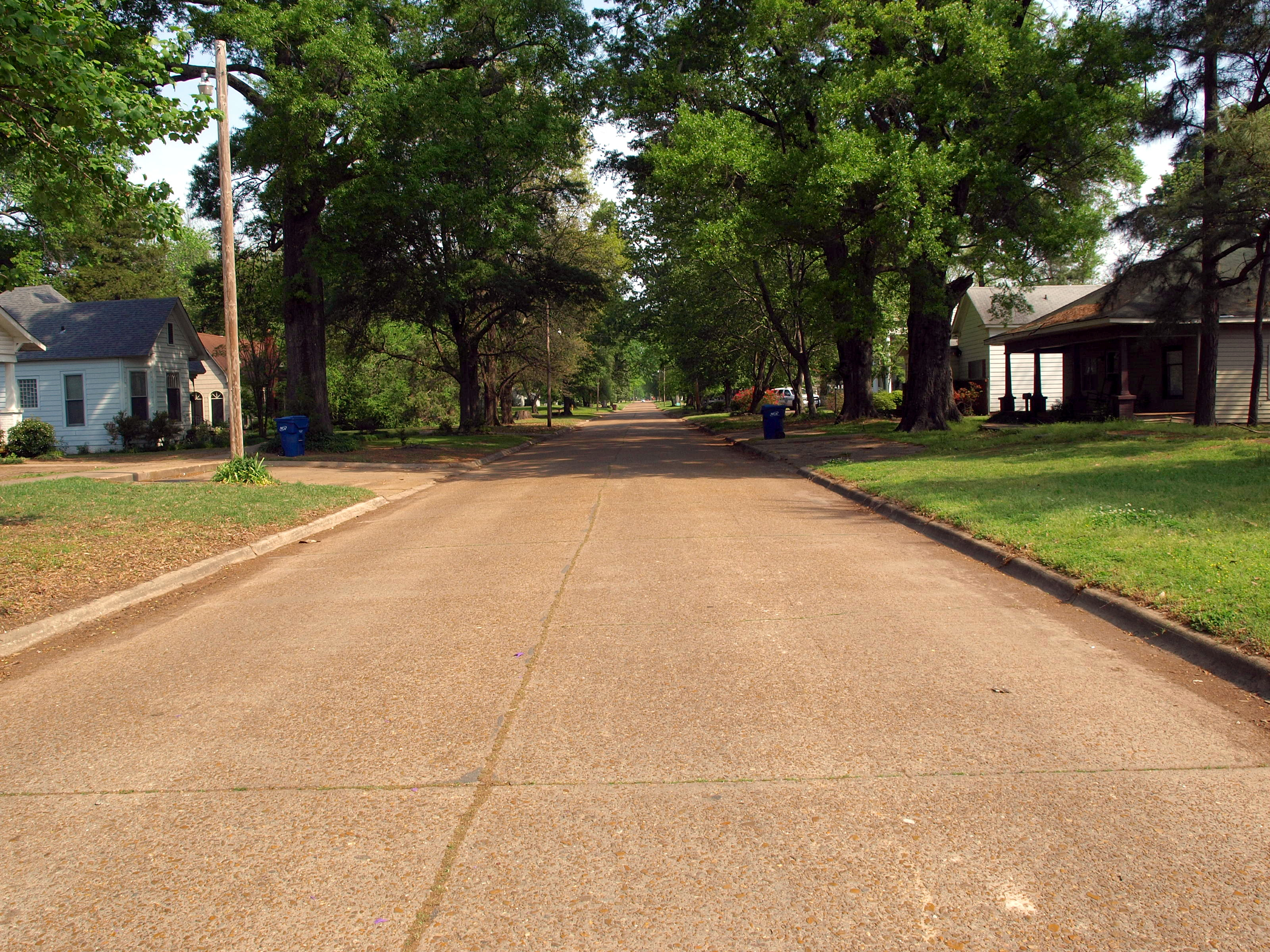
- View along New York Avenue in April 2017

- Location within Arkansas Location within the United States
- Location: Ash St, between Main St. & New York Ave. & New York Ave. between Ash & Lynn Sts., Brinkley, Arkansas
- Coordinates: 34°52′59″N 91°11′47″W
- Area: 2.3 acres (0.93 ha)
- NRHP reference No.: 10000555
- Added to NRHP: January 24, 2017

The Brinkley Concrete Streets are several road sections in Brinkley, Arkansas. They include one block of Ash Street (between New York and Main Streets), and several on New York Street (between Ash and Lynn Streets). These roads are two lanes wide, and were built in 1928-29 out of concrete sections 14 feet (4.3 m) wide and about 24 feet (7.3 m). They were among the first 4 miles (6.4 km) of city streets to be paved, and followed the practice of the nearby Bankhead Highway sections, which were also built in concrete.

The roads were listed on the National Register of Historic Places in 2017.

== See also ==
- National Register of Historic Places listings in Monroe County, Arkansas
