= Holly Grove Presbyterian Church =

Historic church in Arkansas, United States

- U.S. National Register of Historic Places
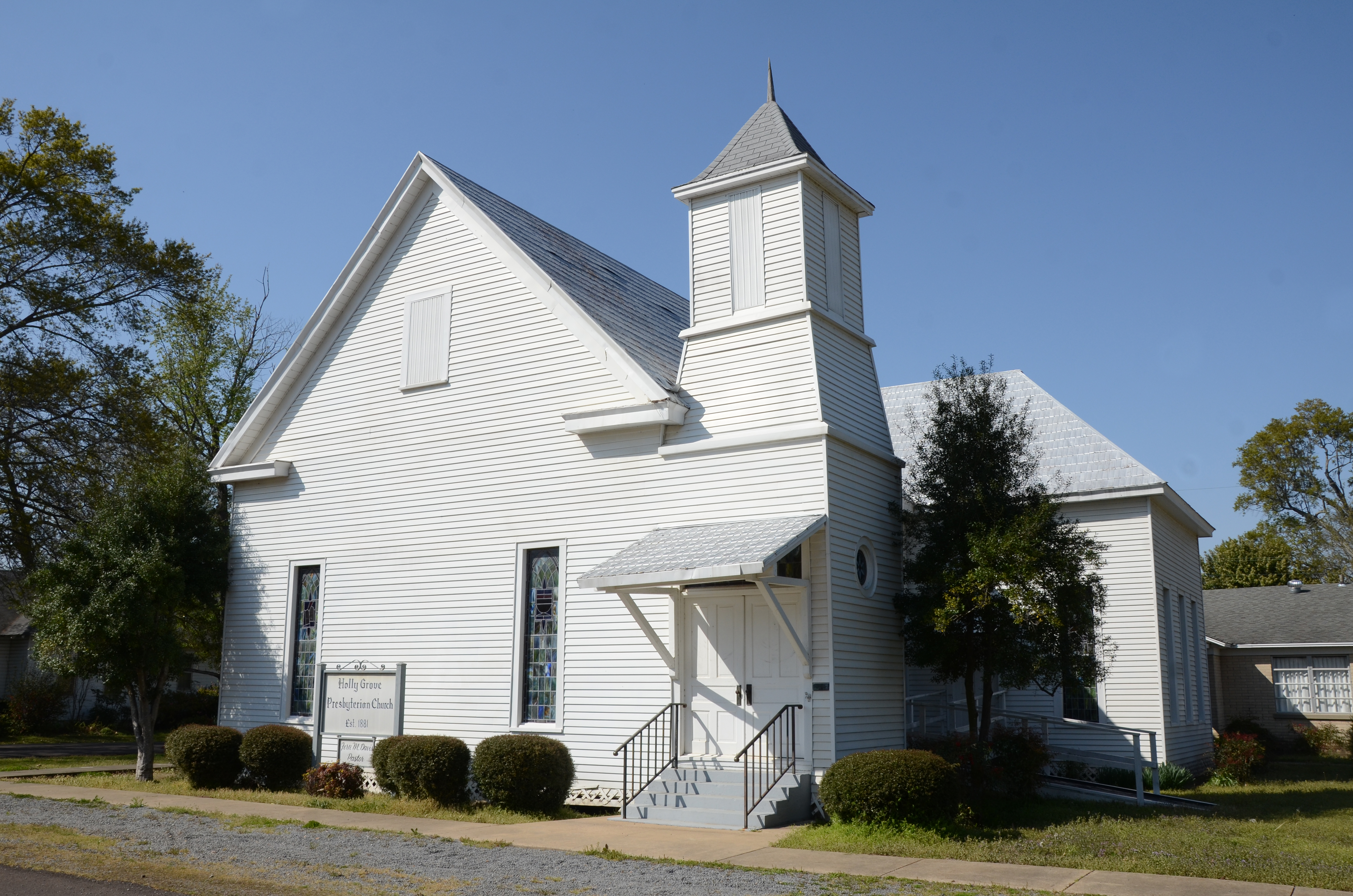

- Location within Arkansas Location within the United States
- Location: 244 East 2nd Street, Holly Grove, Arkansas
- Coordinates: 34°35′51″N 91°12′2″W
- Area: less than one acre
- Architectural style: Greek Revival, Gothic Revival
- NRHP reference No.: 91000581
- Added to NRHP: May 13, 1991

Holly Grove Presbyterian Church is a historic church at 244 East 2nd Street in Holly Grove, Arkansas. It is a single-story wood-frame building, with a gable-roofed rectangular sanctuary, a square tower off to one side, and a Sunday School addition to the rear. The exterior, originally clad in board-and-batten siding, is now finished in metal siding that closely resembles a c. 1900 residing. It exhibits a combination of Greek Revival and Gothic Revival features. It was built in 1881 for a congregation established in 1839, and was its second sanctuary, replacing one destroyed by fire in 1871.

The building was listed on the National Register of Historic Places in 1991.

== See also ==
- National Register of Historic Places listings in Monroe County, Arkansas
