= William Black Family House =

Historic house in Arkansas, United States

- U.S. National Register of Historic Places
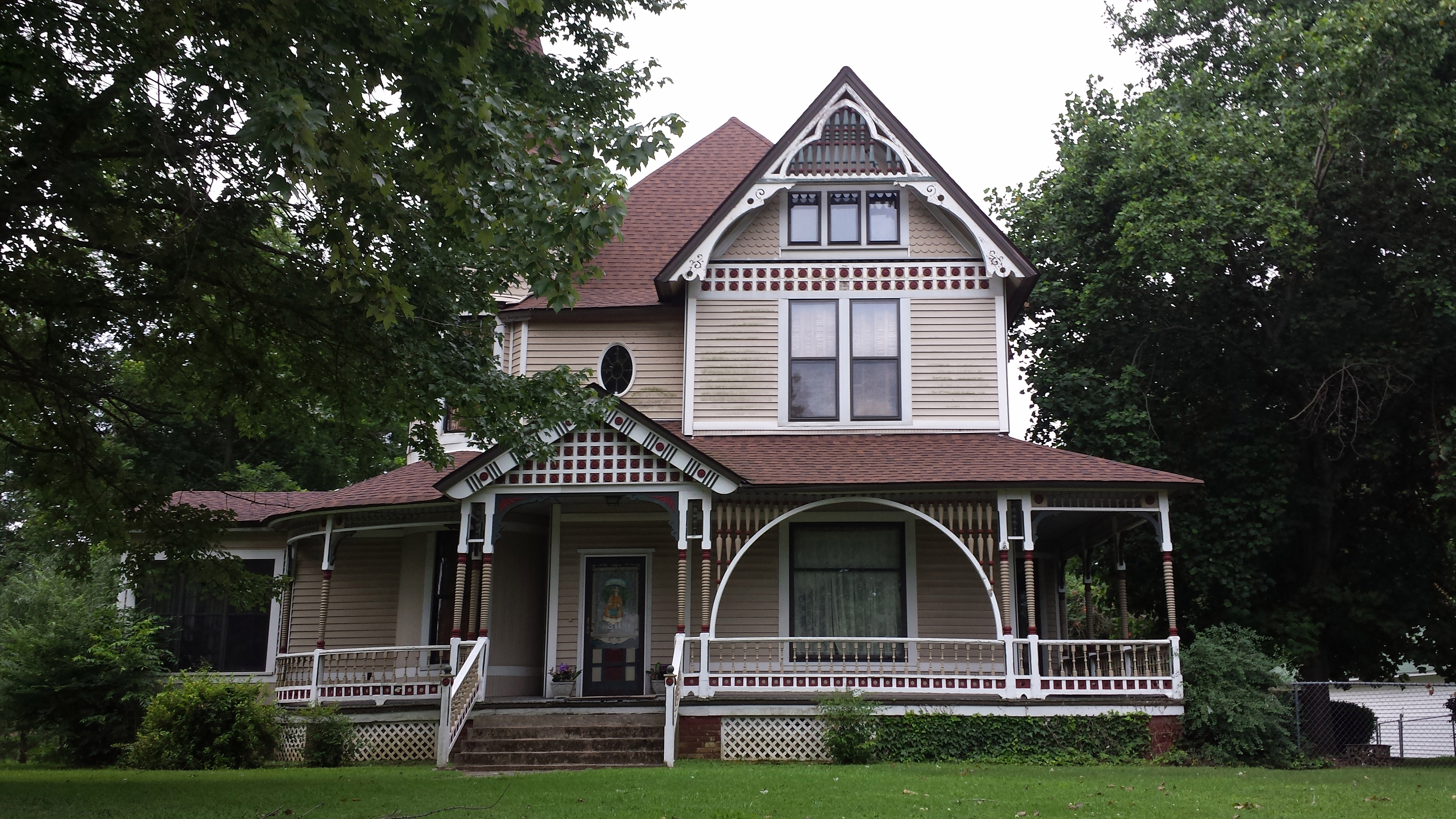

- Location within Arkansas Location within the United States
- Location: 311 W. Ash St., Brinkley, Arkansas
- Coordinates: 34°53′7″N 91°11′44″W
- Area: less than one acre
- Built: 1895
- Architectural style: Queen Anne
- NRHP reference No.: 76000437
- Added to NRHP: December 12, 1976

The William Black Family House is a historic house at 311 West Ash Street in Brinkley, Arkansas. Built in 1895, this two-story wood-frame house is one of the finest examples of Queen Anne architecture in eastern Arkansas. It has asymmetrical massing, and numerous projections, towers, and porches characteristic of the style. Its siding includes different shaped shingles and clapboarding, and decorative vergeboard in some of its gables. The front porch has turned posts and balustrade, and a delicate spindlework arch in one of its bays. It was built for the widow of William Black, a prominent local businessman, politician, and veteran of the American Civil War.

The house was listed on the National Register of Historic Places in 1976.

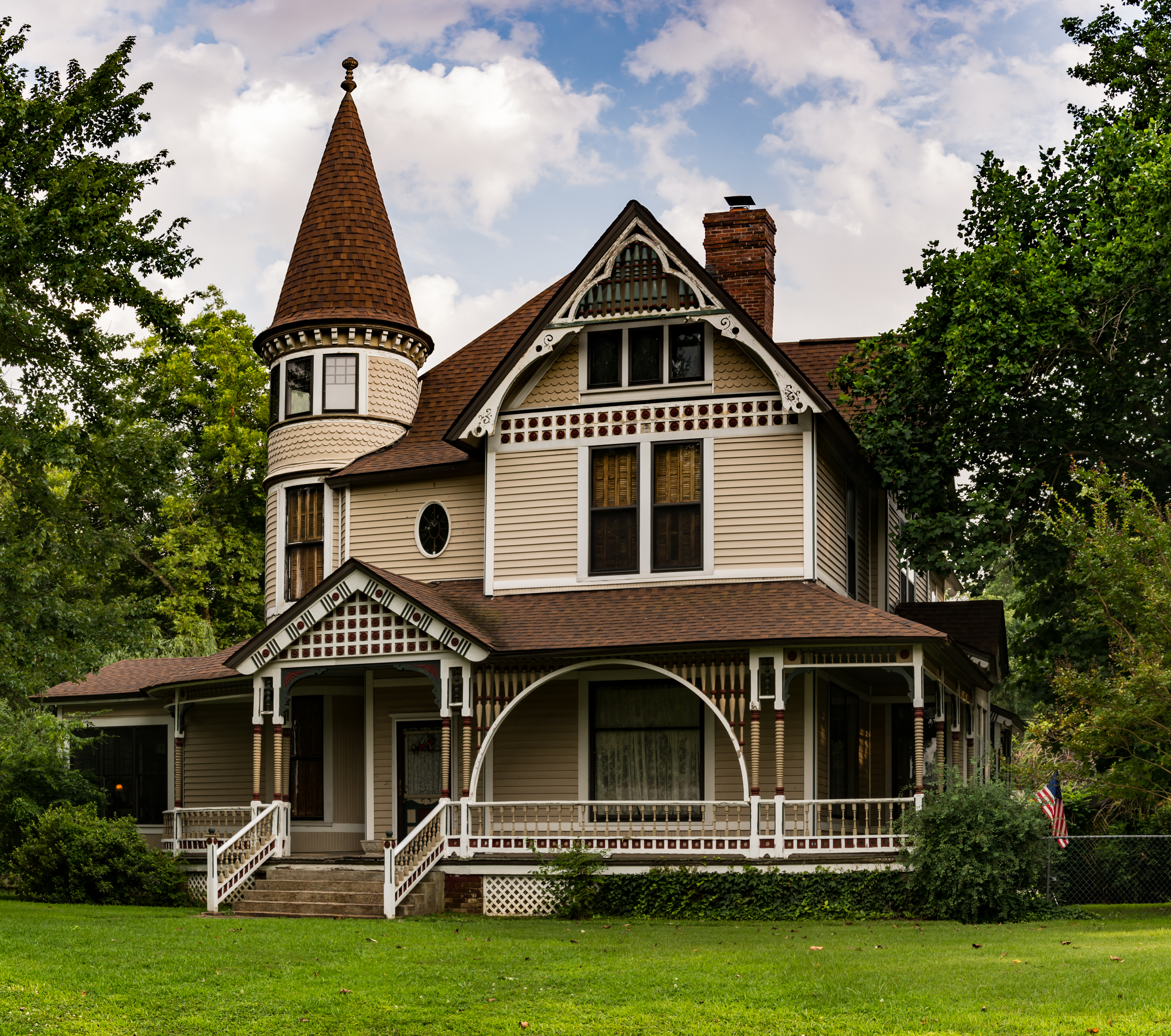
1895 Major William Black House in Brinkley, Arkansas.

== See also ==
- National Register of Historic Places listings in Monroe County, Arkansas
