= Lair House =

Historic house in Arkansas, United States

- U.S. National Register of Historic Places
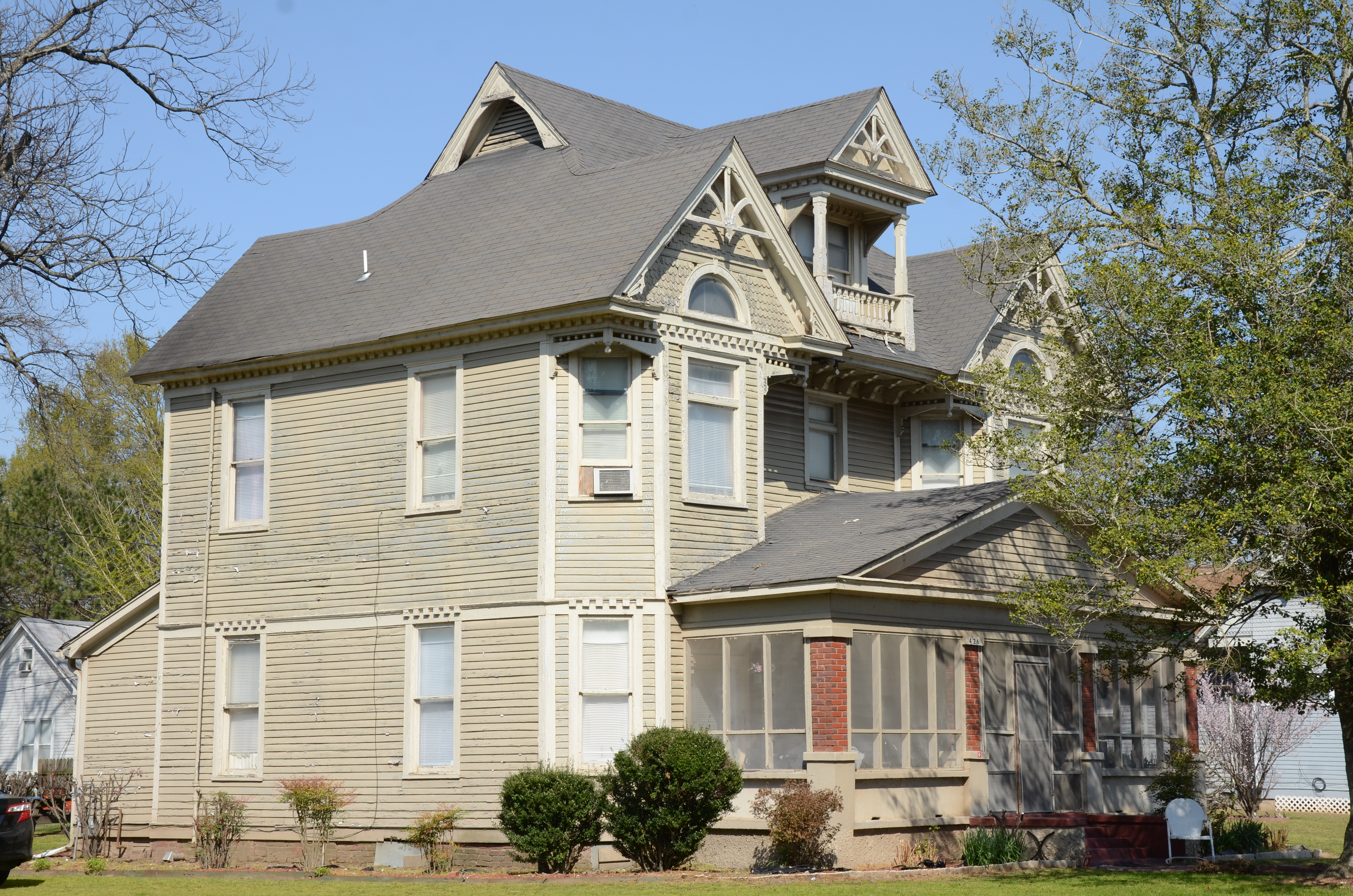

- Location within Arkansas Location within the United States
- Nearest city: Holly Grove, Arkansas
- Coordinates: 34°35′43″N 91°11′46″W
- Area: less than one acre
- Architectural style: Queen Anne
- NRHP reference No.: 98000371
- Added to NRHP: April 23, 1998

The Lair House is a historic house at Stone and Elm Streets in Holly Grove, Arkansas. It is a 2 1/2-story wood-frame structure, with a complex roof line with two forward gables joined by a horizontal crossing section. The gables rest on projecting window bays, with a small gable-roofed porch between at the attic level. The exterior and interior have retained a wealth of Queen Anne woodwork, despite the conversion of its front porch to a more Craftsman-style appearance. Built about 1905, it is one of Holly Grove's finest examples of Queen Anne architecture.

The house was listed on the National Register of Historic Places in 1998.

== See also ==
- National Register of Historic Places listings in Monroe County, Arkansas
