= James A. Walls House =

Historic house in Arkansas, United States

- U.S. National Register of Historic Places
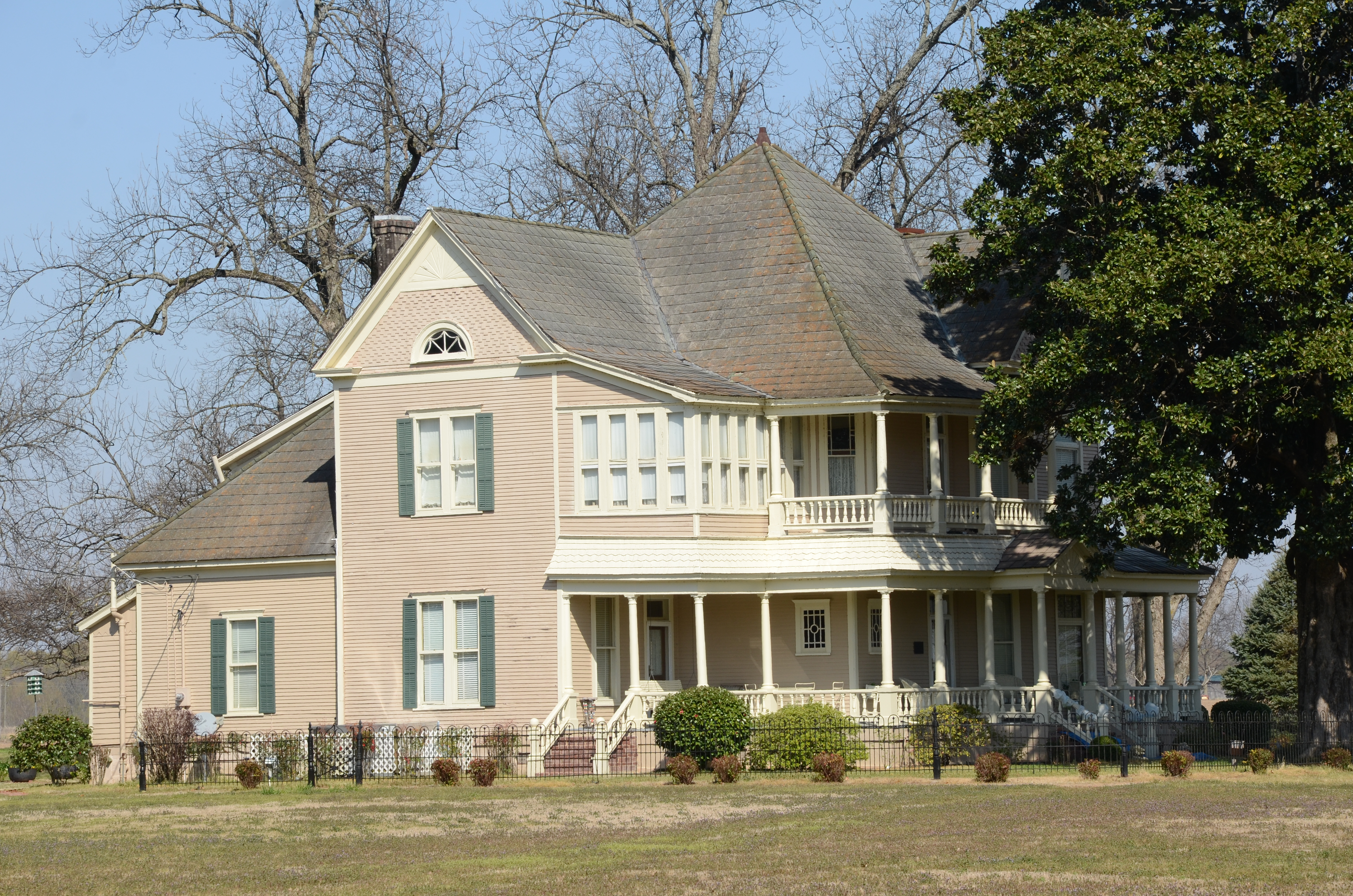

- Location within Arkansas Location within the United States
- Location: Off AR 17, Holly Grove, Arkansas
- Coordinates: 34°35′45″N 91°11′38″W
- Area: 2.4 acres (0.97 ha)
- Built: 1903
- Architect: Mr. Youngblood
- Architectural style: Colonial Revival, Queen Anne
- NRHP reference No.: 80000780
- Added to NRHP: June 9, 1980

The James A. Walls House is a historic house on J. A. Walls Drive on the eastern fringe of Holly Grove, Arkansas. It is an irregularly-shaped 2 1/2-story wood-frame structure with a cross-gabled hip roof, projecting sections, and corner turret typical of the Queen Anne style. Its porch, supported by Tuscan columns, and front entry, with fanlight and pedimented bay, are typical of the Colonial Revival. Built in 1903 by a prominent local builder, is one of the community's finest examples of this transitional style. It is set on a handsome manicured lot over 2 acres (0.81 ha) in size.

The house was listed on the National Register of Historic Places in 1980.

== See also ==
- National Register of Historic Places listings in Monroe County, Arkansas
