= Monroe County Bank Building =

- U.S. National Register of Historic Places
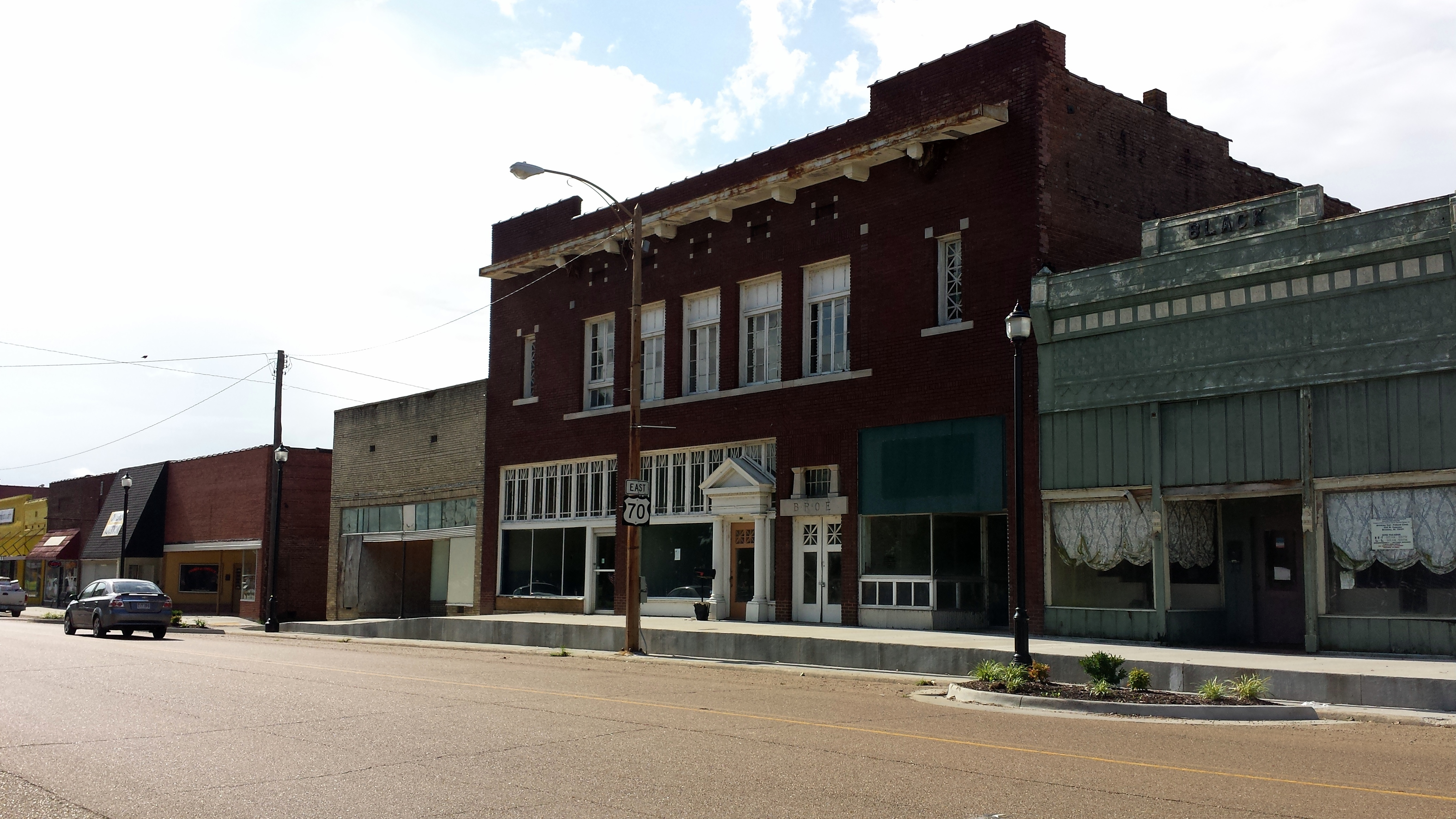

- Location within Arkansas Location within the United States
- Location: 225-227 W. Cypress Sts., Brinkley, Arkansas
- Coordinates: 34°41′33″N 91°18′51″W
- Area: less than one acre
- Built: 1889
- Architectural style: Prairie School; Classical Revival; Craftsman
- NRHP reference No.: 15000995
- Added to NRHP: January 26, 2016

The Monroe County Bank Building is a historic commercial building at 225-227 West Cypress Street in Brinkley, Arkansas. It is a two-story brick building, with brick and stone trim elements. It houses three storefronts on the ground floor, with professional offices and other spaces on the upper floor. It was built about 1889, and its facade was redone in 1909 after suffering extensive damage caused by a tornado. The Monroe County Bank, for whom it was built, was the town's first major bank, and occupied the building until the 1930s. Its upper level also housed the town's largest performance venue of the time.

The building was listed on the National Register of Historic Places in 2016.

== See also ==
- National Register of Historic Places listings in Monroe County, Arkansas
