= Lo Beele House =

Historic house in Arkansas, United States

- U.S. National Register of Historic Places
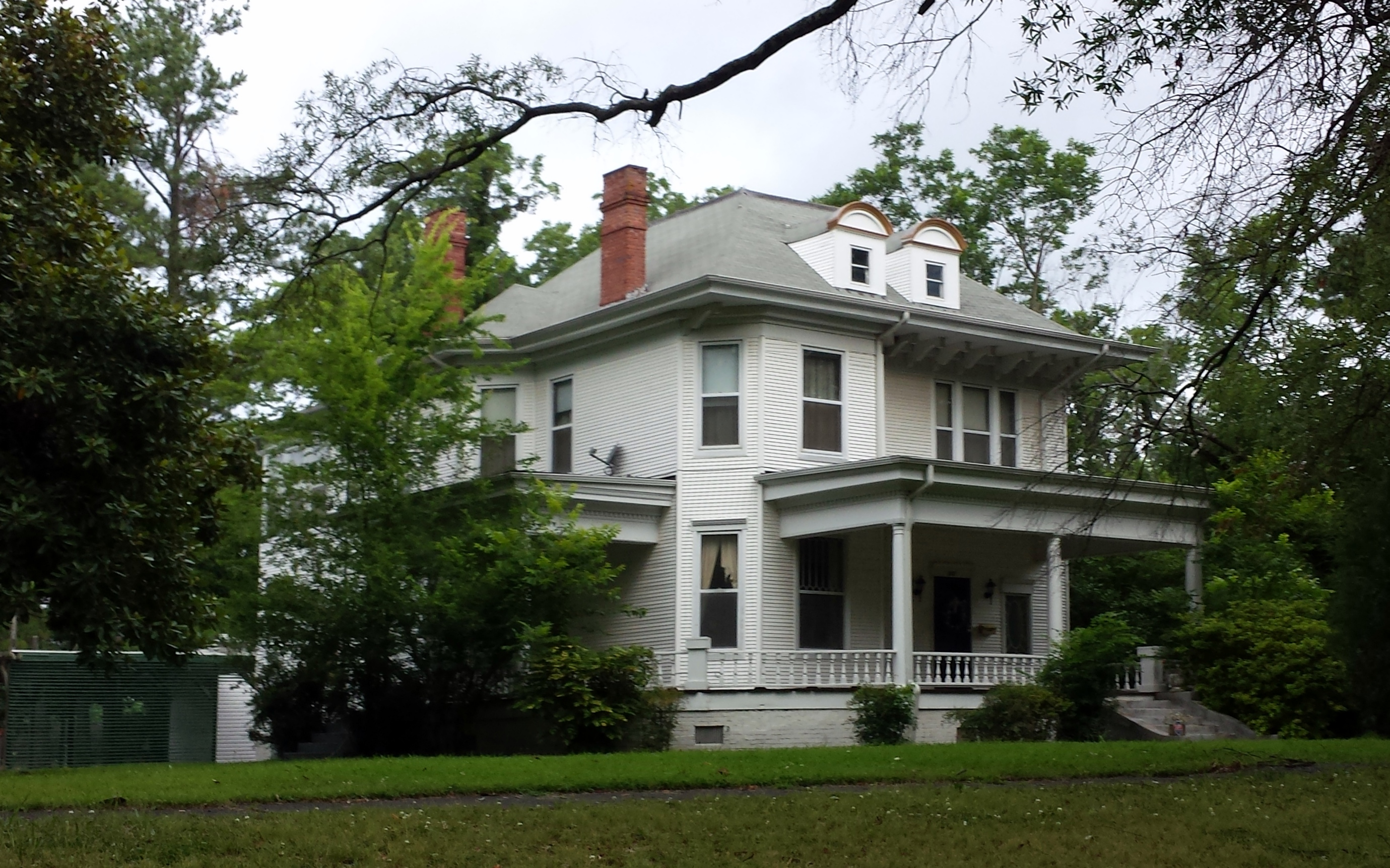

- Location within Arkansas Location within the United States
- Location: 312 New York Ave., Brinkley, Arkansas
- Coordinates: 34°53′23″N 91°11′47″W
- Area: less than one acre
- Built: 1910
- Architect: Charles L. Thompson
- Architectural style: Colonial Revival
- MPS: Thompson, Charles L., Design Collection TR
- NRHP reference No.: 82000866
- Added to NRHP: December 22, 1982

The Lo Beele House is a historic house at 312 New York Avenue in Brinkley, Arkansas. It is a 2 1/2-story American Foursquare house, with a hip roof, pierced at the front by a pair of round-topped dormers. A single-story porch extends across most of the front, with a low balustrade with turned balusters and square posts. A smaller porch stands on the side, with similar styling. The house was designed by Arkansas architect Charles L. Thompson, and was built about 1910.

The house was listed on the National Register of Historic Places in 1982.

== See also ==
- National Register of Historic Places listings in Monroe County, Arkansas
