= Marston House (Clarendon, Arkansas) =

Historic house in Arkansas, United States

- U.S. National Register of Historic Places
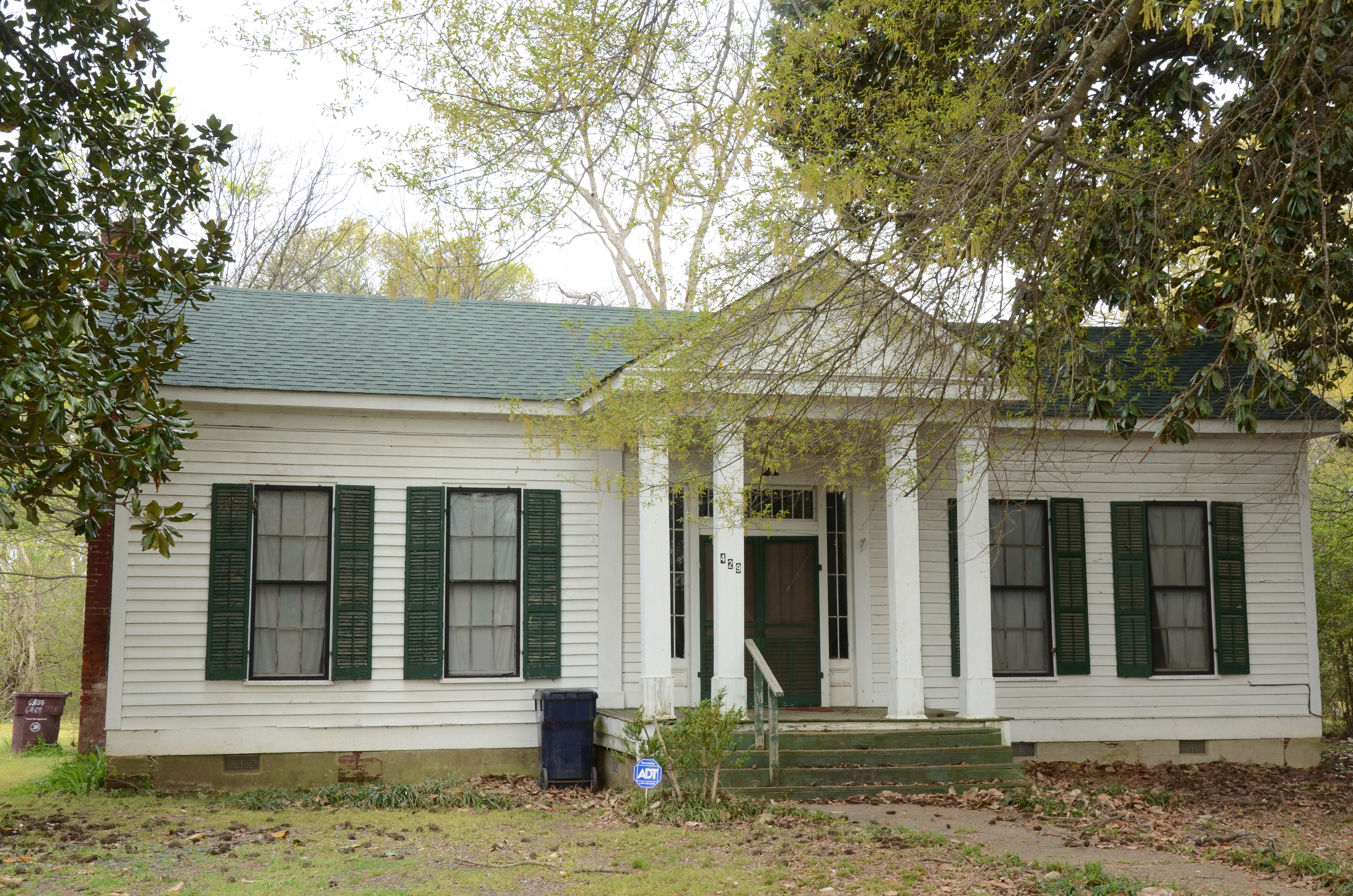

- Location within Arkansas Location within the United States
- Location: 429 Main St., Clarendon, Arkansas
- Coordinates: 34°41′44″N 91°18′44″W
- Area: less than one acre
- Built: 1870
- Architect: Charles N. Roberts
- Architectural style: Greek Revival
- MPS: Clarendon MRA
- NRHP reference No.: 84000194
- Added to NRHP: November 1, 1984

The Marston House is a historic house at 429 Main Street in Clarendon, Arkansas. It is a single-story wood-frame structure, five bays wide, with a side gable roof and a projecting gabled portico sheltering the center entrance. The portico is supported by paired columns, and the entrance is flanked by sidelight windows and topped by a transom. Built in 1870, this is one of Clarendon's oldest surviving houses, and a fine local example of Greek Revival architecture.

The house was listed on the National Register of Historic Places in 1984.

== See also ==
- National Register of Historic Places listings in Monroe County, Arkansas
