= Monroe County Courthouse (Clarendon, Arkansas) =

- U.S. National Register of Historic Places
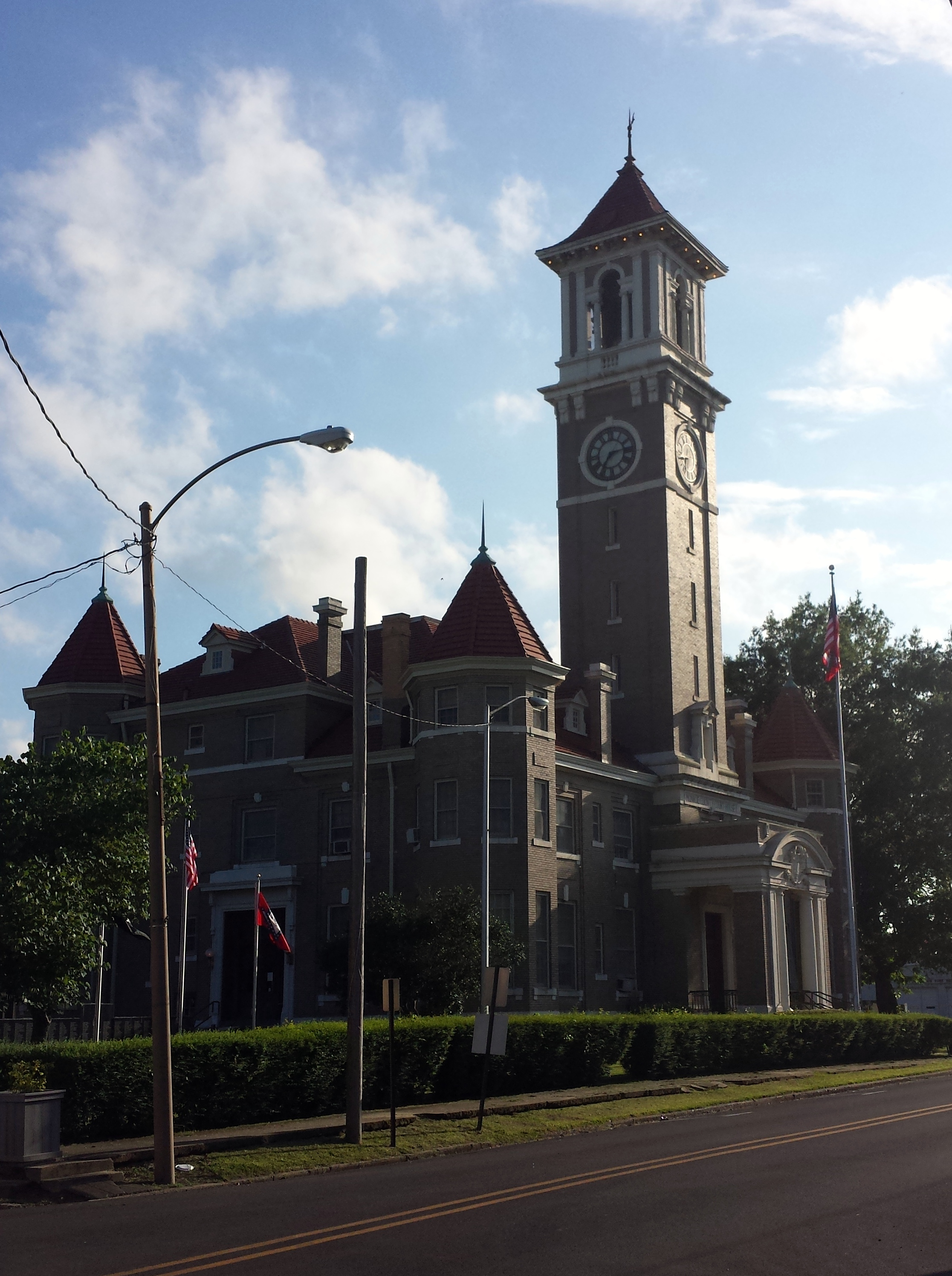

- Location within Arkansas Location within the United States
- Location: Courthouse Sq., Clarendon, Arkansas
- Coordinates: 34°41′33″N 91°18′51″W
- Area: less than one acre
- Built: 1911; 115 years ago
- Built by: W.A. Prather & Co.
- Architect: Charles L. Thompson
- NRHP reference No.: 76000439
- Added to NRHP: October 14, 1976

The Monroe County Courthouse is located at Courthouse Square in Clarendon, the county seat of Monroe County, Arkansas. It is a large brick building with Classical Revival features, designed by the architect Charles L. Thompson and built in 1911. It has low octagonal towers topped by tile roofs at each corner, and a tall clocktower on its main facade. The interior lobby spaces are finished with ceramic tile floors and marble wainscoting.

The building was listed on the National Register of Historic Places in 1976.
