= Clarendon, Arkansas =

- City
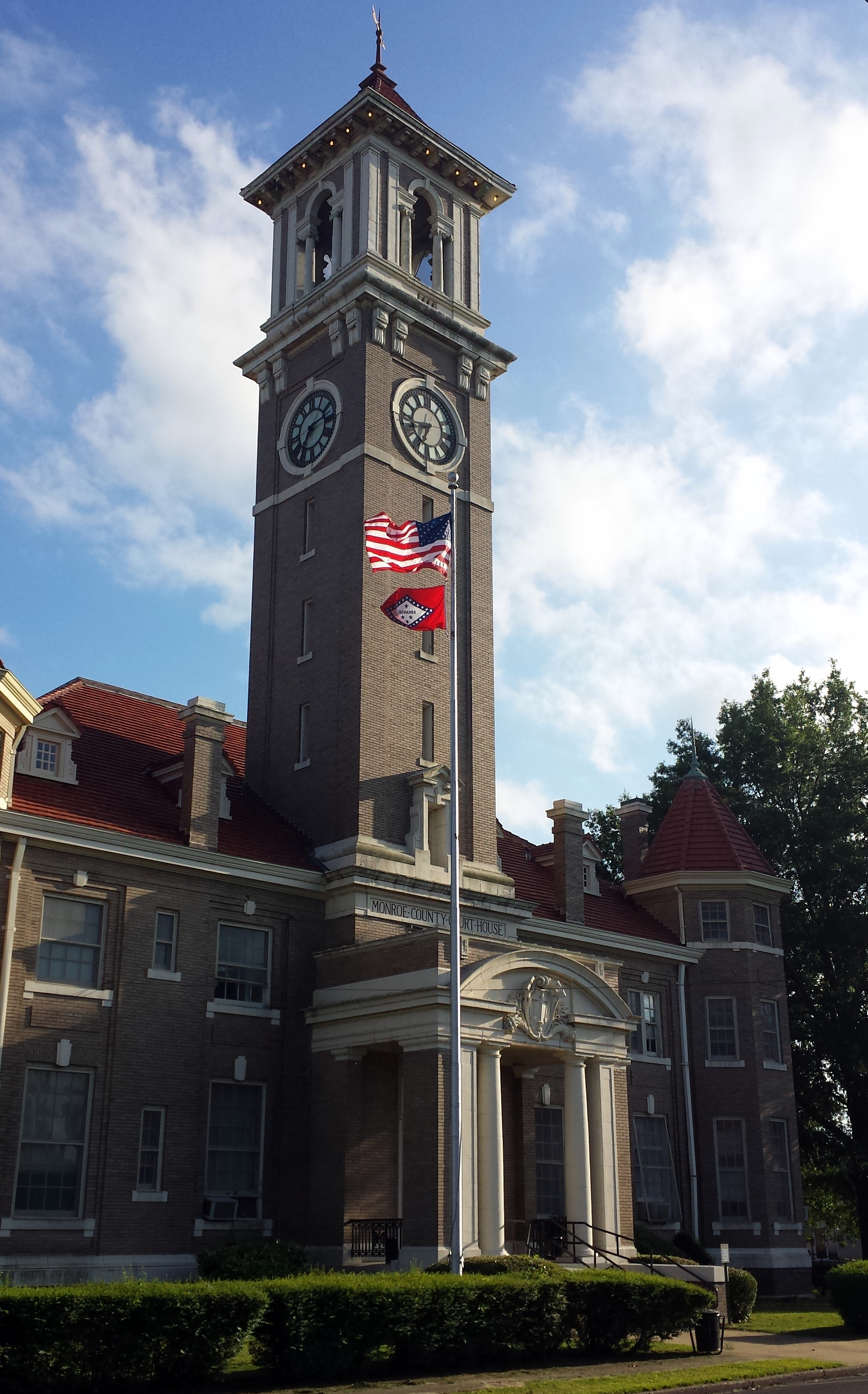
- Monroe County Courthouse in downtown Clarendon

- Location in Monroe County, Arkansas
- Coordinates: 34°41′35″N 91°18′23″W
- Country: United States
- State: Arkansas
- County: Monroe

Area
  - Total: 1.93 sq mi (5.00 km^{2})
  - Land: 1.75 sq mi (4.53 km^{2})
  - Water: 0.18 sq mi (0.46 km^{2})
- Elevation: 174 ft (53 m)

Population (2020)
  - Total: 1,526
  - Estimate (2025): 1,394 ▼
  - Density: 872.4/sq mi (336.84/km^{2})
- Time zone: UTC-6 (Central (CST))
  - Summer (DST): UTC-5 (CDT)
- ZIP code: 72029
- Area code: 870
- FIPS code: 05-13990
- GNIS feature ID: 2404054
- Website: www.cityofclarendonar.com

Clarendon is a city in and the county seat of Monroe County, Arkansas, United States. Located in the Arkansas Delta, the city's position on the White River at the mouth of the Cache River has defined the community since first incorporating in 1859. Although the river has brought devastation and disaster to the city occasionally throughout history, it has also provided economic opportunities, transportation, recreation and tourism to the city.

Once home to a variety of industries, today Clarendon's economy is largely based on agriculture. Similar to many Delta communities, the city's population has been dwindling since mechanization on the farm reduced the number of agricultural-related jobs in the area. At the 2020 census, the population was 1,526, the lowest value recorded since 1890.

== History ==
=== Settlement through antebellum period ===
The area around Clarendon was originally populated by various Native American groups. By 1799, French hunters and trappers had built cabins at the mouth of the Cache River. It was the point where the Military Road from Memphis, Tennessee, to Little Rock crossed the White River. The Military Road was begun in 1826 and completed in 1828. By that date, a ferry crossing and post office had been established in Clarendon, and the town served as the terminus for a stagecoach line to the west. The Military Road was used as the route for some groups of Native Americans being relocated from eastern states to Oklahoma during the forced relocations commonly known as the Trail of Tears; Chickasaw, Choctaw, Creek, and Cherokee groups are known to have traveled along it.

The town also acquired railroad connections. In 1872 the town was added to the Arkansas Central Railway, later the Arkansas Midland Railroad, linking it to the Mississippi River port of Helena, Arkansas. Though it required construction of a 4-mile-long White River bridge and trestle, Clarendon was added to the line of the Texas and St. Louis Railway, a continuous system between Texas and Missouri, by mid-1883. The Texas and St. Louis Railway trackage became the St. Louis Southwestern Railway or “Cotton Belt” in 1891, and the Arkansas Midland trackage later became the part of the St. Louis, Iron Mountain and Southern Railway in 1910.

=== Civil War and Reconstruction ===
The city of Clarendon was officially incorporated in 1859. In 1864, the city was burned to the ground by Union forces in retaliation for the sinking of the tinclad Union gunboat USS Queen City by forces under the command of Confederate Brigadier General Joseph O. Shelby. The town's charter was dissolved in 1884, and it was reincorporated in 1898.

=== Gilded age through early 20th century ===
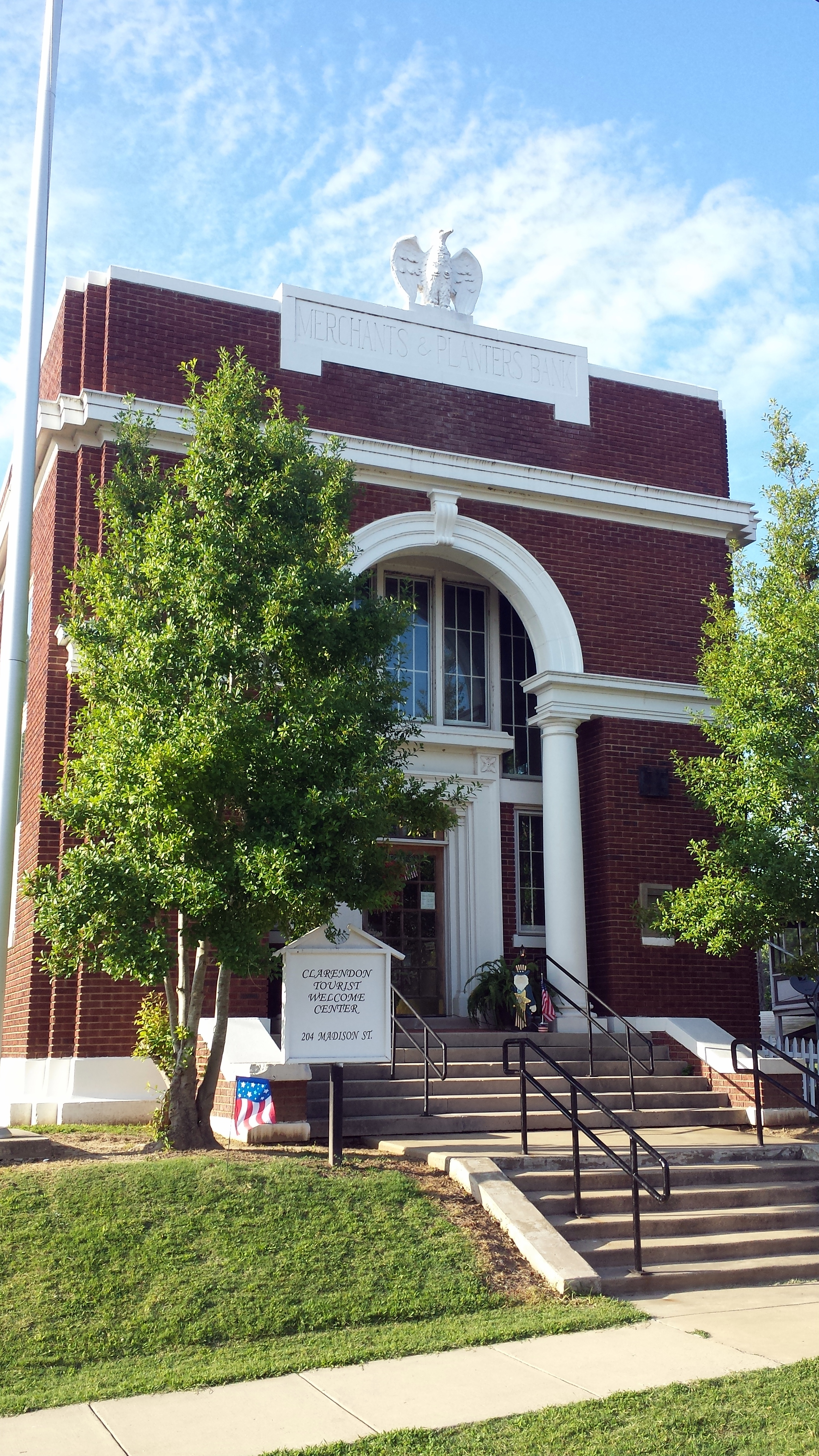
The Merchants and Planters Bank was built in 1921 and designed by Charles L. Thompson.

In the early 1900s, Clarendon developed a number of industries, including lumber, staves and barrels, oars, and buttons made from the shells of the area's plentiful freshwater mussels. The mussels also provided freshwater pearls, which were bought and sold at the Clarendon Pearl Market. The Moss Brothers Bat Company supplied baseball bats to a number of major league baseball players during this era.

Like most of eastern Arkansas, Clarendon was devastated by the Great Mississippi Flood of 1927. The main levee at Clarendon held until the White River reached a height of 38.5 feet (11.7 m), 8.5 feet (2.6 m) above normal flood stage; the flood eventually crested at 44 feet (13 m). While no fatalities were reported, the town was inundated by water up to the second floor of many buildings, and the catastrophic inrush of water when the levee broke caused considerable damage to many buildings. The cleanup of mud and debris took many years.

=== World War II onwards ===
The area around Clarendon today is primarily agricultural; tourism related to the area's hunting and fishing resources is the most common non-agricultural economic activity. The reported rediscovery of the ivory-billed woodpecker in 2004–2005 in the Cache River and White River National Wildlife Refuges has brought new attention to the area.

== Geography ==
Clarendon is 16 miles (26 km) southwest of Brinkley, 21 miles (34 km) northeast of Stuttgart, and 33 miles (53 km) west-southwest of Marianna.

According to the United States Census Bureau, the city has a total area of 1.93 square miles (5.00 km^{2}), of which 1.75 square miles (4.53 km^{2}) are land and 0.18 square miles (0.47 km^{2}), or 9.28%, are water. Clarendon is located at the mouth of the Cache River, where it empties into the White River.

=== Climate ===
According to the Köppen Climate Classification system, Clarendon has a humid subtropical climate, abbreviated "Cfa" on climate maps. The climate in this area is characterized by hot, humid summers and generally mild to cool winters.

Climate data for Clarendon, Arkansas
| Month | Jan | Feb | Mar | Apr | May | Jun | Jul | Aug | Sep | Oct | Nov | Dec | Year |
|---|---|---|---|---|---|---|---|---|---|---|---|---|---|
| Record high °F (°C) | 79 (26) | 85 (29) | 86 (30) | 93 (34) | 95 (35) | 102 (39) | 106 (41) | 104 (40) | 101 (38) | 94 (34) | 85 (29) | 79 (26) | 106 (41) |
| Mean daily maximum °F (°C) | 49 (9) | 54 (12) | 63 (17) | 72 (22) | 81 (27) | 88 (31) | 91 (33) | 91 (33) | 84 (29) | 74 (23) | 62 (17) | 51 (11) | 72 (22) |
| Mean daily minimum °F (°C) | 30 (−1) | 34 (1) | 42 (6) | 50 (10) | 60 (16) | 68 (20) | 72 (22) | 69 (21) | 60 (16) | 49 (9) | 41 (5) | 33 (1) | 51 (11) |
| Record low °F (°C) | −4 (−20) | 3 (−16) | 15 (−9) | 28 (−2) | 35 (2) | 48 (9) | 53 (12) | 49 (9) | 36 (2) | 28 (−2) | 16 (−9) | −2 (−19) | −4 (−20) |
| Average precipitation inches (mm) | 3.69 (94) | 4.40 (112) | 4.90 (124) | 5.17 (131) | 5.35 (136) | 3.83 (97) | 3.86 (98) | 2.27 (58) | 3.30 (84) | 4.45 (113) | 4.98 (126) | 5.51 (140) | 51.71 (1,313) |
| Average snowfall inches (cm) | 0.7 (1.8) | 0.2 (0.51) | 0 (0) | 0 (0) | 0 (0) | 0 (0) | 0 (0) | 0 (0) | 0 (0) | 0 (0) | 0 (0) | 0 (0) | 0.9 (2.3) |
| Average precipitation days (≥ 0.01 in) | 9.0 | 9.2 | 9.9 | 8.7 | 10.4 | 7.8 | 7.3 | 5.8 | 6.0 | 7.5 | 8.9 | 9.0 | 99.5 |
| Average snowy days (≥ 0.1 in) | 0.1 | 0 | 0 | 0 | 0 | 0 | 0 | 0 | 0 | 0 | 0 | 0 | 0.1 |
Source: The Weather Channel

== Demographics ==
Historical population
| Census | Pop. | Note | %± |
|---|---|---|---|
| 1880 | 400 | | — |
| 1890 | 1,060 | | 165.0% |
| 1900 | 1,840 | | 73.6% |
| 1910 | 2,037 | | 10.7% |
| 1920 | 2,638 | | 29.5% |
| 1930 | 2,149 | | −18.5% |
| 1940 | 2,551 | | 18.7% |
| 1950 | 2,547 | | −0.2% |
| 1960 | 2,293 | | −10.0% |
| 1970 | 2,563 | | 11.8% |
| 1980 | 2,361 | | −7.9% |
| 1990 | 2,072 | | −12.2% |
| 2000 | 1,960 | | −5.4% |
| 2010 | 1,664 | | −15.1% |
| 2020 | 1,526 | | −8.3% |
| 2025 (est.) | 1,394 | ▼ | −8.7% |
U.S. Decennial Census

=== 2020 census ===
As of the 2020 census, Clarendon had a population of 1,526 and 397 families residing in the city.

The median age was 44.3 years. 22.7% of residents were under the age of 18 and 23.6% of residents were 65 years of age or older. For every 100 females there were 85.2 males, and for every 100 females age 18 and over there were 81.0 males age 18 and over.

0.0% of residents lived in urban areas, while 100.0% lived in rural areas.

There were 688 households in Clarendon, of which 25.1% had children under the age of 18 living in them. Of all households, 32.7% were married-couple households, 20.9% were households with a male householder and no spouse or partner present, and 40.6% were households with a female householder and no spouse or partner present. About 40.7% of all households were made up of individuals and 20.3% had someone living alone who was 65 years of age or older.

There were 817 housing units, of which 15.8% were vacant. The homeowner vacancy rate was 2.8% and the rental vacancy rate was 9.2%.

Racial composition as of the 2020 census
| Race | Number | Percent |
|---|---|---|
| White | 867 | 56.8% |
| Black or African American | 545 | 35.7% |
| American Indian and Alaska Native | 15 | 1.0% |
| Asian | 4 | 0.3% |
| Native Hawaiian and Other Pacific Islander | 2 | 0.1% |
| Some other race | 45 | 2.9% |
| Two or more races | 48 | 3.1% |
| Hispanic or Latino (of any race) | 61 | 4.0% |

=== 2000 census ===
As of the census of 2000, there were 1,960 people, 814 households, and 520 families residing in the city. The population density was 1,072.9 inhabitants per square mile (414.2/km^{2}). There were 925 housing units at an average density of 506.3 per square mile (195.5/km^{2}). The racial makeup of the city was 68.47% White, 30.20% Black or African American, 0.46% Native American, 0.05% Asian, and 0.82% from two or more races. 2.35% of the population were Hispanic or Latino of any race.

There were 814 households, out of which 26.9% had children under the age of 18 living with them, 43.5% were married couples living together, 16.2% had a female householder with no husband present, and 36.1% were non-families. 33.0% of all households were made up of individuals, and 16.7% had someone living alone who was 65 years of age or older. The average household size was 2.38 and the average family size was 3.02.

In the city, the population was spread out, with 26.3% under the age of 18, 8.1% from 18 to 24, 24.1% from 25 to 44, 25.5% from 45 to 64, and 16.1% who were 65 years of age or older. The median age was 38 years. For every 100 females, there were 91.8 males. For every 100 females age 18 and over, there were 86.0 males.

The median income for a household in the city was $22,927, and the median income for a family was $30,250. Males had a median income of $25,972 versus $18,125 for females. The per capita income for the city was $11,902. About 20.8% of families and 28.9% of the population were below the poverty line, including 44.4% of those under age 18 and 26.5% of those age 65 or over.

== Economy ==
The economy of Clarendon is largely defined by the agricultural sector. The city and Clarendon School District are also key employers in the city.

== Education ==
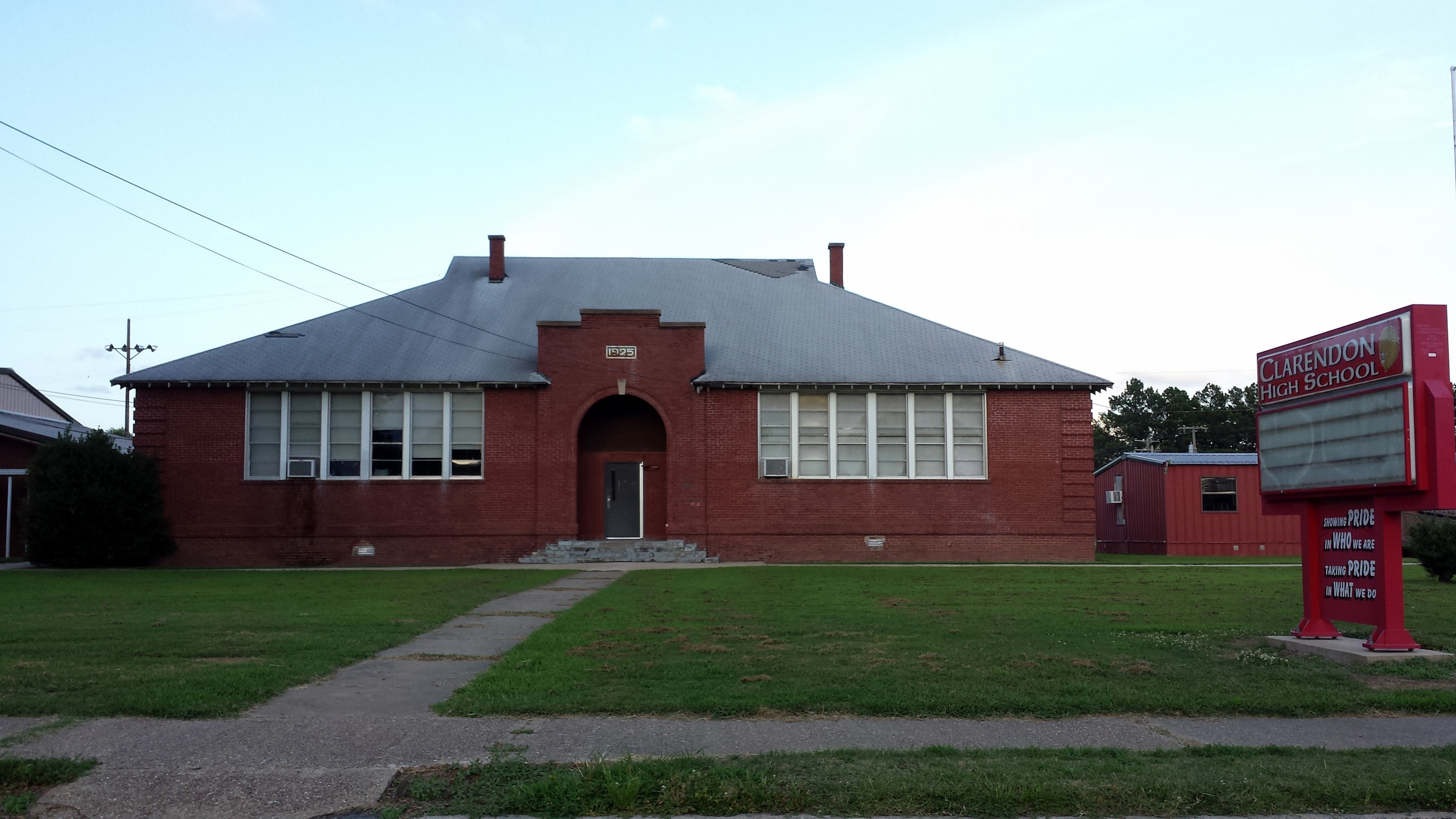
Clarendon High School

Public education for elementary and secondary school students is provided by the Clarendon School District, which includes:

- Clarendon Elementary School, serving prekindergarten through grade 6.
- Clarendon High School, serving grades 7 through 12.

== Infrastructure ==
=== Healthcare ===
The Mid-Delta Health Center in Clarendon provides medical and dental services to residents in Clarendon and the surrounding area. A total of 3,318 patients utilized the clinic in 2013 according to the Bureau of Primary Health Care.

=== Transportation ===
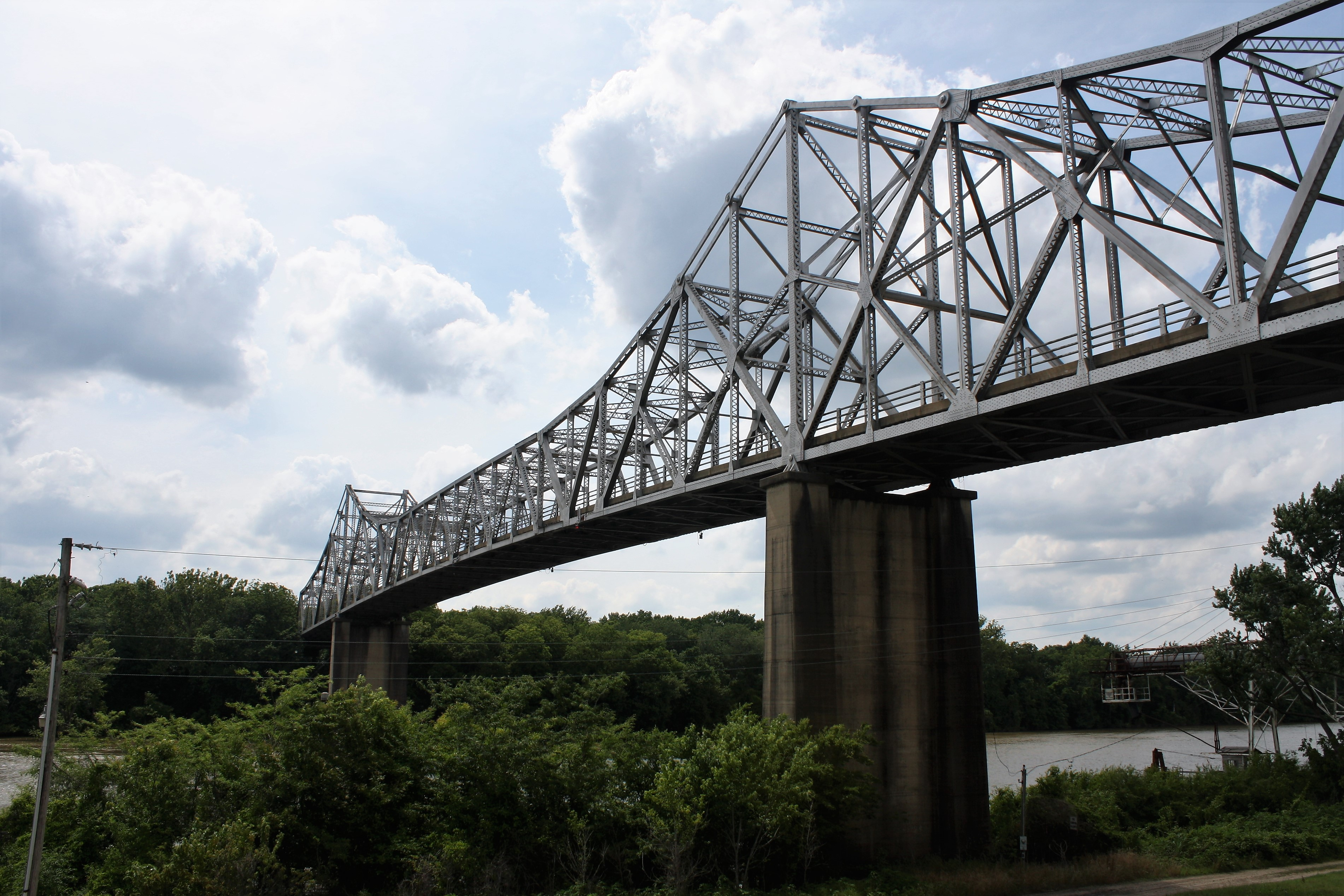
Highway 79 Bridge over the White River

The major highway through Clarendon is U.S. Highway 79, which gives access to Stuttgart to the south, Marianna to the east and Brinkley (via U.S. Highway 49) to the north. Within the city, U.S. Highway 79B serves the central business district. Highway 302 is a north–south highway that begins at Madison Street in Clarendon and runs north to Highway 17 very near U.S. Highway 70.

The historic Clarendon Bridge over the White River has been replaced with a new alignment to the south of Clarendon by the Arkansas Department of Transportation (ARDOT). U.S. Highway 79 was slightly rerouted, with several miles of new bridges constructed over the White River, Cache River, Roc Roe Bayou, and several other waterways. The 1931 bridge, listed on the National Register of Historic Places (NRHP) and Historic American Engineering Record (HAER), has been subject to local restoration efforts as a bike and pedestrian path. The main span of the bridge was demolished using explosives on the morning of November 19, 2019.

=== Utilities ===
Wastewater is collected and conveyed to the Clarendon Wastewater Treatment Plant (WWTP) south of town. The facility uses a lagoon system, filters, and chlorination to produce treated effluent in accordance with the city's NPDES permit administrated by the Arkansas Department of Environmental Quality (ADEQ).
