= National Register of Historic Places listings in St. Francis County, Arkansas =

Location of St. Francis County in Arkansas

This is a list of the National Register of Historic Places listings in St. Francis County, Arkansas.

This is intended to be a complete list of the properties on the National Register of Historic Places in St. Francis County, Arkansas, United States. The locations of National Register properties for which the latitude and longitude coordinates are included below, may be seen in a map.

There are 16 properties listed on the National Register in the county.

Contents: Counties in Arkansas
- Arkansas
- Ashley
- Baxter
- Benton
- Boone
- Bradley
- Calhoun
- Carroll
- Chicot
- Clark
- Clay
- Cleburne
- Cleveland
- Columbia
- Conway
- Craighead
- Crawford
- Crittenden
- Cross
- Dallas
- Desha
- Drew
- Faulkner
- Franklin
- Fulton
- Garland
- Grant
- Greene
- Hempstead
- Hot Spring
- Howard
- Independence
- Izard
- Jackson
- Jefferson
- Johnson
- Lafayette
- Lawrence
- Lee
- Lincoln
- Little River
- Logan
- Lonoke
- Madison
- Marion
- Miller
- Mississippi
- Monroe
- Montgomery
- Nevada
- Newton
- Ouachita
- Perry
- Phillips
- Pike
- Poinsett
- Polk
- Pope
- Prairie
- Pulaski (Little Rock)
- Randolph
- St. Francis
- Saline
- Scott
- Searcy
- Sebastian
- Sevier
- Sharp
- Stone
- Union
- Van Buren
- Washington
- White
- Woodruff
- Yell

This National Park Service list is complete through NPS recent listings posted January 30, 2026.

== Current listings ==
| | Name on the Register | Image | Date listed | Location | City or town | Description |
|---|---|---|---|---|---|---|
| 1 | Blackfish Lake Ferry Site | | April 10, 2003 (#03000195) | Address Restricted | New Shady Grove | A Trail of Tears site |
| 2 | Scott Bond Family Plot | | June 6, 2002 (#02000603) | 0.3 miles west of 5th St. on Highway 70, W. 35°00′45″N 90°43′53″W | Madison | |
| 3 | Campbell House | Campbell House | December 21, 2006 (#06000841) | 305 N. Forrest St. 35°00′49″N 90°47′03″W | Forrest City | |
| 4 | First United Methodist Church | First United Methodist Church | May 19, 1994 (#94000467) | 101 S. Izard St. 35°00′33″N 90°47′01″W | Forrest City | |
| 5 | Forrest City City Hall | | May 11, 2022 (#100007718) | 224 North Rosser St. 35°00′38″N 90°47′13″W | Forrest City | |
| 6 | Forrest City Cemetery | | September 21, 2021 (#100007000) | SFC Rd. 702, south of U.S. Route 70, west of Margaret Dr., east of Union Pacific RR; 35°00′32″N 90°46′16″W | Forrest City | also known as City Colored Cemetery |
| 7 | Forrest City High School | | October 8, 1992 (#92001341) | Rosser St. 35°00′59″N 90°47′21″W | Forrest City | |
| 8 | Forrest City Public Library | | January 7, 2022 (#100007321) | 421 South Washington St. 35°00′22″N 90°47′02″W | Forrest City | |
| 9 | Highway A-1, Forrest City Segment | | January 16, 2026 (#100012578) | Saint Francis County Roads 200 and 212 west of U.S. 70; 34°59′54″N 90°49′04″W | Forrest City | |
| 10 | Highway B-1, Little Telico Creek Bridge | | May 20, 2009 (#09000316) | SFC 213 Rd. over Little Telico Creek; 35°03′57″N 90°48′57″W | Caldwell | |
| 11 | Hughes Water Tower | Hughes Water Tower | October 5, 2006 (#06000905) | Church St. 34°57′03″N 90°28′21″W | Hughes | |
| 12 | Mann House | | December 22, 1982 (#82000937) | 422 Forest St. 35°00′17″N 90°46′13″W | Forrest City | |
| 13 | St. Francis River Bridge | St. Francis River Bridge | April 9, 1990 (#90000516) | U.S. Route 70, over the St. Francis River; 35°02′07″N 90°42′46″W | Madison | |
| 14 | Smith House | | December 22, 1982 (#82000938) | Memphis Ave. 34°54′40″N 91°06′33″W | Wheatley | |
| 15 | William Stone House | | October 8, 1992 (#92001346) | Southeastern corner of the junction of Highway 306 and Doris Ln. 35°07′53″N 90°48′38″W | Colt | |
| 16 | Stuart Springs | | August 3, 1977 (#77001502) | Stuart St. 35°01′07″N 90°46′45″W | Forrest City | |

== See also ==
- List of National Historic Landmarks in Arkansas
- National Register of Historic Places listings in Arkansas
