= Memphis to Little Rock Road =

Archaeological site in Arkansas, United States

Route information
- Length: 135.5 mi (218.1 km)
- Existed: 1819–present

Major junctions
- West end: Southwest Trail in Little Rock, AR
- East end: a point opposite the town of Memphis [across the Mississippi River]

Location
- Country: United States
- States: Arkansas, Tennessee

Highway system
- Settlement routes

The Memphis to Little Rock Road (also known as the Military Road) was a settlement road constructed between 1819 and Reconstruction in Arkansas. The project was one of many internal improvements (infrastructure projects) to assist settlement of the Old Southwest as well as military defense of the Arkansas Territory.

== History ==
The city of Memphis was founded on May 22, 1819 by John Overton, James Winchester and Andrew Jackson. Given the advantageous position on the Chickasaw Bluffs above the Mississippi River, the city quickly developed into a trade and transportation center. As King Cotton became more important, the fertile lands of the Mississippi Delta surrounding Memphis becoming cotton plantations, and the city became a major cotton market and brokerage center, as well as a hub for African-American slave trading.

At the time of achieving territorial status in 1819, Arkansas was largely a rough and sparsely wilderness covered by swamps and forests rather than populated settlements. The US government thought a road between Memphis, Tennessee and the nascent territorial capital Little Rock would aid development of the frontier territory. Federal support eventually came on January 31, 1824, with $15,000 ($440,000 in today's dollars) allocated for surveying a route.

=== Construction ===
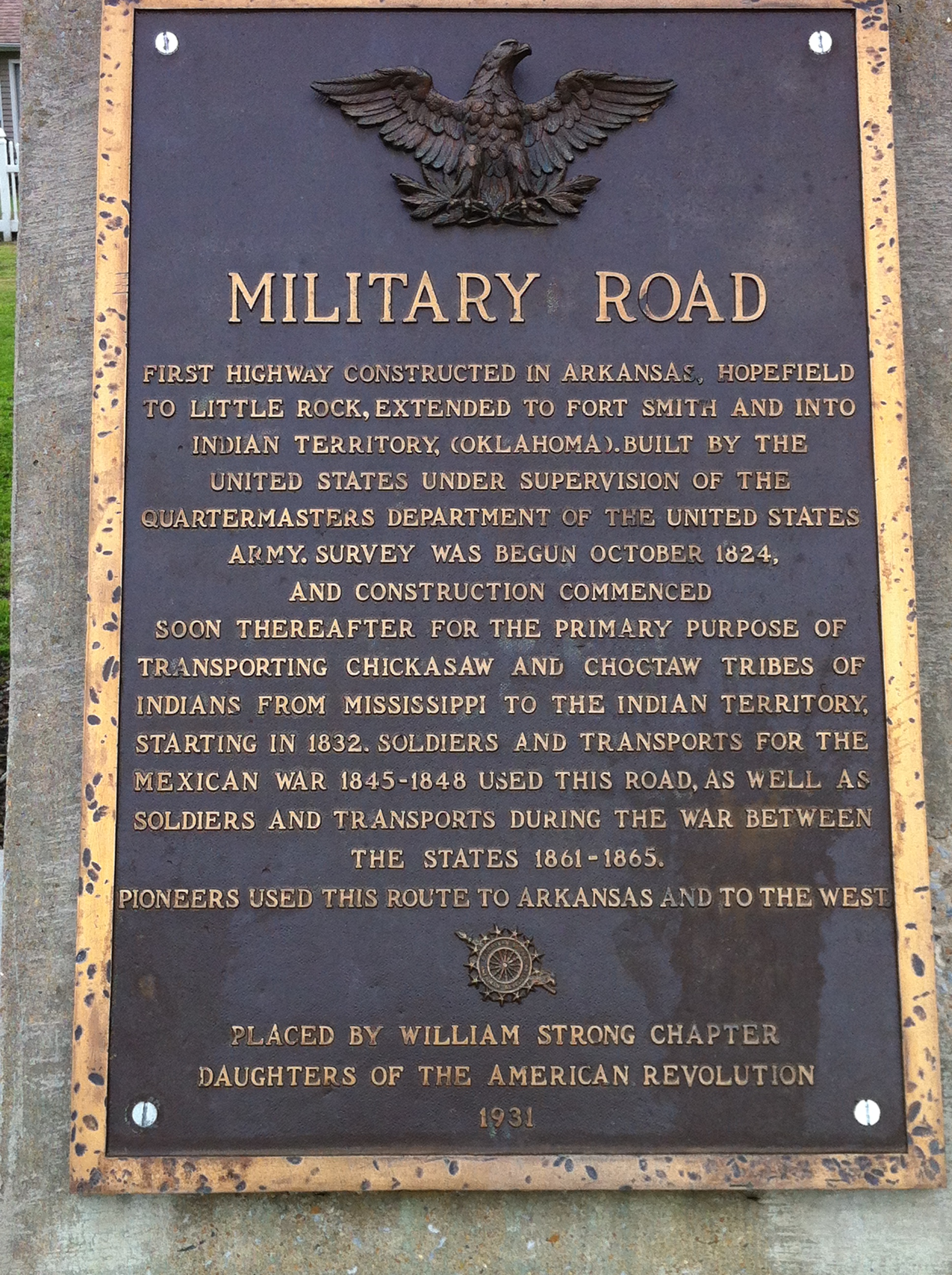
Military Road marker at Marion, Arkansas

Shortly after setting out from Memphis the team of three surveyors found terrain along the route very wet and swampy. Despite arguments over the best alignment, an alignment of 135.5 miles (218.1 km) was selected, cutting the total distance by over 60 miles (97 km) (prior journeys being via Arkansas Post or Helena, Arkansas). By 1828, the 24 feet (7.3 m) wide dirt road was open, though still subject to closures following seasonal rains. By 1831, the Arkansas General Assembly requested an $20,000 ($605,000 in today's dollars) for repairs. Flooding made the road impassible, sometimes for months at a time, impeding the emigrants to settle Arkansas and points west. Now represented by Ambrose Sevier in the US House of Representatives, Arkansas had the ear of President Andrew Jackson. Studies to determine the necessary improvements produced an additional $106,000 ($3,419,000 in today's dollars) from Congress in 1834 to construct an entirely new road, bridges, levees, and drainage improvements. The right-of-way now exceeded 200 feet (61 m), as trees were cleared on both sides of the road to allow sunlight to dry the roadway.

== National Register of Historic Places ==
Five preserved segments of the Memphis to Little Rock Road in Arkansas are listed on the National Register of Historic Places. Despite arguments over the best alignment, an alignment of 135.5 miles (218.1 km) was selected, cutting the total distance by over 60 miles (97 km) (previous journeys had been via Arkansas Post or Helena, Arkansas.

=== Strong's Ferry ===
- Memphis to Little Rock Road-Strong's Ferry Segment
- U.S. National Register of Historic Places
- Location within Arkansas Location within the United States
- Nearest city: Jennette, Arkansas
- Architect: Strong, William
- MPS: Cherokee Trail of Tears MPS
- NRHP reference No.: 12000274
- Added to NRHP: May 15, 2012

The Memphis to Little Rock Road-Strong's Ferry Segment is one of the best-preserved portions of the historic Memphis to Little Rock Road built in 1828. Located in eastern Cross County, Arkansas within the Arkansas Delta, this road is notable for the large numbers of westward-traveling pioneers who used it en route to settling the American Plains, and for its use in the forced migration of several Native American tribes in the 1830s. This roadway portion extends from the site of a former ferry crossing on the St. Francis River, westward toward Village Creek State Park, where there is another surviving segment that is hikable.

The road segment was listed on the National Register of Historic Places in 2012.

=== Village Creek ===
- Memphis to Little Rock Road-Village Creek Segment
- U.S. National Register of Historic Places
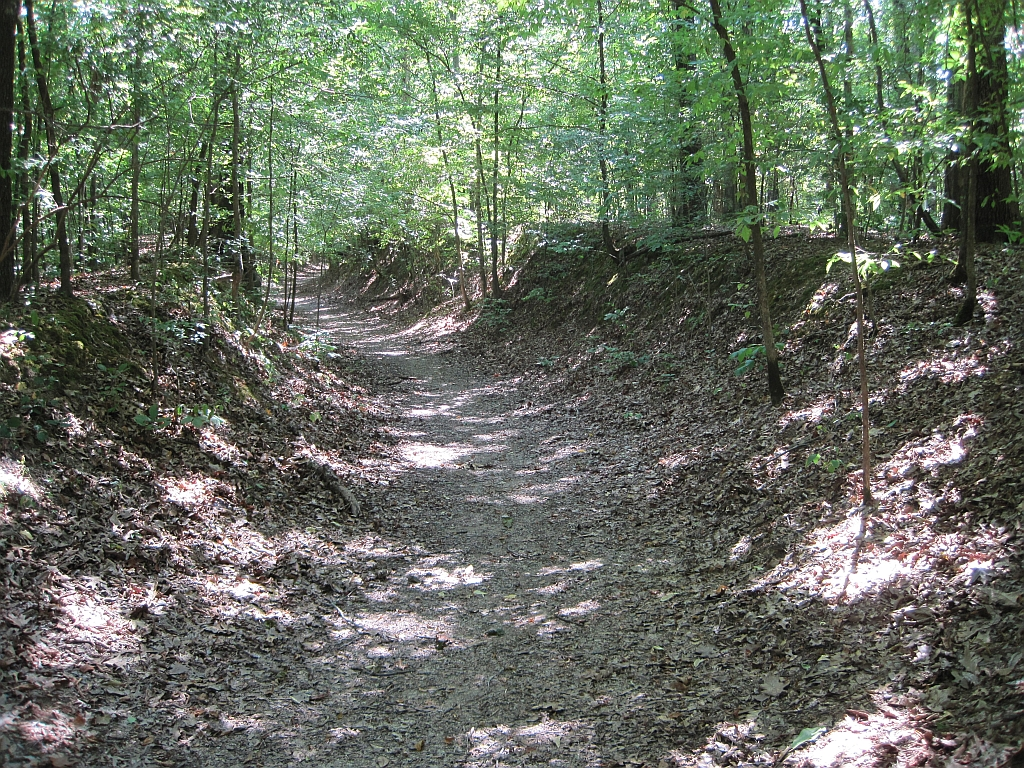

- Location within Arkansas Location within the United States
- Nearest city: Newcastle, Arkansas
- Area: 10 acres (4.0 ha)
- Built by: Anderson B. Carr
- MPS: Cherokee Trail of Tears MPS
- NRHP reference No.: 03000193
- Added to NRHP: April 11, 2003

The Memphis to Little Rock Road-Village Creek Segment is a preserved segment of the historic Memphis to Little Rock Road military road in Cross County, Arkansas. Located entirely within Village Creek State Park, this 1.5-mile (2.4 km) segment of roadway is one of the best-preserved portions of the military road built in 1828. The roadway portion, in parts set in dramatically deep cuts in the hills, extends from Village Creek in the east to the western boundary of the park, and is accessible today as a hiking trail.

The road segment was listed on the National Register of Historic Places in 2003.

=== Henard Cemetery Road ===
- Memphis to Little Rock Road-Henard Cemetery Road Segment
- U.S. National Register of Historic Places
- Location within Arkansas Location within the United States
- Location: Henard Cemetery Rd., Zent, Arkansas
- Coordinates: 34°59′22″N 91°9′13″W
- Area: 10 acres (4.0 ha)
- Built by: William Strong
- MPS: Cherokee Trail of Tears MPS
- NRHP reference No.: 03000470
- Added to NRHP: May 30, 2003

The Memphis to Little Rock Road-Henard Cemetery Road Segment is a section of historic roadway in Monroe County, Arkansas. It consists of 650 metres (2,130 ft) of the middle of Henard Cemetery Road, located northeast of the hamlet of Zent in the far northeastern part of the county. The roadway section is one of three known places where the original 19th-century appearance of the first road to connect Memphis, Tennessee to Little Rock, Arkansas is preserved. The far ends of the road have been impacted by development and agriculture, and do not convey the sense of the road's early appearance. The road is also historically important as it was used as part of the Trail of Tears, the forced removal of Native Americans east of the Mississippi River to what is now Oklahoma.

The road segment was listed on the National Register of Historic Places in 2003.

=== Brownsville ===
- Memphis to Little Rock Road-Brownsville Segment
- U.S. National Register of Historic Places
- Location within Arkansas Location within the United States
- Nearest city: Brownsville, Arkansas
- Area: less than one acre
- Built: 1838
- Built by: Samson Gray
- MPS: Cherokee Trail of Tears MPS
- NRHP reference No.: 03000954
- Added to NRHP: September 27, 2003

The Memphis to Little Rock Road-Brownsville Segment is a historic military road section in Lonoke County, Arkansas. Located north of Lonoke near the hamlet of Brownsville, the road section was part of the 1828 Memphis to Little Rock Military Road. It was used in the 1830s during the Trail of Tears removal of eastern Native American tribes, and was used by military forces on both sides of the American Civil War leading up to the Battle of Brownsville.

The road segment was listed on the National Register of Historic Places in 2006.

=== Bayou Two Prairie ===
- Memphis to Little Rock Road-Bayou Two Prairie Segment
- U.S. National Register of Historic Places
- Location within Arkansas Location within the United States
- Nearest city: Brownsville, Arkansas
- Area: less than one acre
- Built: 1838
- Built by: Samson Gray
- MPS: Cherokee Trail of Tears MPS
- NRHP reference No.: 06000836
- Added to NRHP: September 20, 2006

The Memphis to Little Rock Road-Bayou Two Prairie Segment is a historic military road section in Lonoke County, Arkansas. Located north of Lonoke near the hamlet of Brownsville, the road section was part of the 1828 Memphis to Little Rock Military Road. It was used in the 1830s during the Trail of Tears removal of eastern Native American tribes, and was used by military forces on both sides of the American Civil War leading up to the Battle of Brownsville.

The road segment was listed on the National Register of Historic Places in 2006.

== See also ==
- Blackfish Lake Ferry Site
- National Register of Historic Places listings in Cross County, Arkansas
- National Register of Historic Places listings in Lonoke County, Arkansas
- National Register of Historic Places listings in Monroe County, Arkansas
