= List of places in Arkansas: Z =

Arkansas State Seal

This list of current cities, towns, unincorporated communities, and other recognized places in the U.S. state of Arkansas whose name begins with the letter Z. It also includes information on the number and names of counties in which the place lies, and its lower and upper zip code bounds, if applicable.

== Cities and Towns ==
| Name of place | Number of counties | Principal county | Lower zip code | Upper zip code |
|---|---|---|---|---|
| Zack | 1 | Searcy County | 72650 | |
| Zent | 1 | Monroe County | 72021 | |
| Zinc | 1 | Boone County | 72601 | |
| Zion | 1 | Izard County | 72556 | |

== Townships ==
| Name of place | Number of counties | Principal county | Lower zip code | Upper zip code |
|---|---|---|---|---|
| Zinc Township | 1 | Boone County | | |
