= Leonard Muhammad =

Chief-of-Staff of the Nation of Islam (born 1945)

- Born: United States
- Spouse: Donna Farrakhan Muhammad

Leonard Muhammad (born 1945) is the Chief-of-Staff of the Nation of Islam. He was born in Forrest City, Arkansas, his birth name was Leonard Searcy, he changed it when he married Donna Farrakhan Muhammad in 1983.

He is the son-in-law of Minister Louis Farrakhan. His wife, Donna Farrakhan Muhammad, is the second female minister in the Nation of Islam.

In 2003, he became an adviser to Michael Jackson.
