= McFadden House =

McFadden House may refer to:

== United States ==
(by state)

- Phillip G. McFadden House, Tucson, Arizona, listed on the NRHP in Pima County, Arizona
- McFadden House (Holton, Kansas), listed on the NRHP in Jackson County, Kansas
- Beecher-McFadden Estate, Peekskill, New York, listed on the NRHP in Westchester County, New York
- John H. McFadden House, Bartlett, Tennessee, listed on the NRHP in Shelby County, Tennessee
- O. B. McFadden House, Chehalis, Washington, listed on the NRHP in Lewis County, Washington
