= Stan Winfrey =

American football player (born 1953)

No. 33, 36
- Position: Running back

Personal information
- Born: February 20, 1953 (age 73); Forrest City, Arkansas, U.S.
- Listed height: 5 ft 11 in (1.80 m)
- Listed weight: 223 lb (101 kg)

Career information
- High school: Forrest City
- College: Arkansas State
- NFL draft: 1975: 2nd round, 49th overall pick

Career history
- Miami Dolphins (1975–1977); Tampa Bay Buccaneers (1977)

Career NFL statistics
- Games played: 30
- Rushing yards: 215
- Touchdowns: 1
- Stats at Pro Football Reference

Stan Winfrey (born February 20, 1953) is an American former professional football player who was a running back in the National Football League (NFL). He played for the Miami Dolphins from 1975 to 1977 and for the Tampa Bay Buccaneers in 1977.
