= Highway B-1, Little Telico Creek Bridge =

- U.S. National Register of Historic Places
- Location within Arkansas Location within the United States
- Location: SFC 213 Rd. over Little Telico Creek, Caldwell, Arkansas
- Coordinates: 35°4′3″N 90°48′57″W
- Area: less than one acre
- Built: 1918
- MPS: Historic Bridges of Arkansas MPS
- NRHP reference No.: 09000316
- Added to NRHP: May 20, 2009

The Highway B-1, Little Telico Creek Bridge is a historic bridge in Caldwell, Arkansas. It is a reinforced concrete bridge, built c. 1918, which now carries Airport Road over Little Telico Creek on the south side of the city. The bridge was built at a time when standards for concrete bridges had not yet been set. It has three spans with an overall length of 80 feet (24 m) and a width of 19 feet (5.8 m). It was built as part of a general construction plan to improve the road system in St. Francis County, and originally carried Highway B-1, which was later redesignated Arkansas Highway 1. It carried this roadway until 1964, when the present alignment of Highway 1 was built just to the east.

The bridge was listed on the National Register of Historic Places in 2009.

== See also ==
- National Register of Historic Places listings in St. Francis County, Arkansas
- List of bridges on the National Register of Historic Places in Arkansas
