= FCSD =

FCSD may refer to:

- Shakhtar Donetsk
- Forrest City School District
- A fellow of the Chartered Society of Designers
