= Lew Buford Brown =

American editor and lawyer (1861–1944)

- Born: June 13, 1861; Madison, Arkansas, C.S.
- Died: August 16, 1944 (aged 83)
- Other name: Llewellyn Buford Brown
- Occupations: Editor and poet

Llewellyn Buford Brown, also known as Lew Brown, (June 13, 1861 – August 16, 1944) was an American lawyer, newspaper publisher, and promoter for Saint Petersburg, Florida. He owned and edited the Evening Independent in that city from 1908 to 1927.

Brown was famous for the "Sunshine Offer" that offered a free newspaper for every day in St. Petersburg without sunshine.

== Early life ==
Brown was born in Madison, Arkansas on June 13, 1861 during the American Civil War. His mother was Amelia L. Brown and his father was George L. Brown, a captain in the Confederate Army. Lew had two younger sisters, Cora and Hattie. Brown was home schooled by his father and never received a full public education despite his desire for one.

After the war, the Brown family moved to St. Louis, Missouri then to Helena, Missouri, then Madison and Forrest City, Arkansas. In Forest City, Brown claimed that he witnessed the murder of a white man by a black man.

== Career beginnings ==
A year after moving to Forrest City, the Brown family moved to Ozark. George Brown had bought the Ozark Banner to publish himself. At age 10, after his father's health declined, Brown left school to help in the print shop. At age 13, Brown and his sisters began printing their own Saturday paper, the Monthly Visitor. George Brown died in April 1876.

Brown's mother married Joseph William Cummings a few months later. The family later sold the Banner and moved to Cloverport, Kentucky and later Louisville, Kentucky. In Louisville, Brown joined the Courier-Journal as a journeyman printer. He later became the foreman, journalist and poet for both it and the Louisville Times.

== Marriage ==
On February 11, 1885, Brown married Emma Julia Struby. He then picked up a third job working as foreman for a Sunday paper called the Truth. On July 11, 1886, the couple had their first child, Llewellyn Chauncey Brown. He also became the editor of the Labor Record.

In November 1886, the stress of Brown's s four jobs and Chauncey's ill-health motivated the Brown family to move to Spencer County, Indiana to live on a farm called Fairview Farm. Brown spent all his money to get the seed and capital to plant, but the crop was washed away by rain. Brown then regained his job at the Courier-Journal and moved back to Louisville that spring.

On August 13, 1889, the Browns had another child, Albert Young. Brown suffered a heart attack a few weeks later and was warned by doctors to take it easier. In response, the Brown family moved to Peewee Valley, Kentucky to grow peaches. However, the peach crop was not fit for eating and their house burned down.

Brown then bought the Spencer Courier and resumed his newspaper work. On August 26, 1890, Barbra Brown was born. Later that year, the Spencer Courier printing office burned down, forcing a move.

== Law career ==
Due to the Panic of 1893, Brown decided to become a lawyer to supplement his newspaper income. After obtaining his law license, Brown became a Police Judge, then a State Attorney.

Brown and his wife were baptized as Christians on August 28, 1894. Brown later become a Sunday school teacher, then the superintendent.

On December 13, 1893, Albert Brown died of diphtheria. Six days later, his mother, Julia Brown died of a heart attack. Brown married Julia's sister, Mollie Amelia Struby on October 10, 1895. Barbra Brown died on November 17 from diphtheria. Amelia Louise Brown was born on September 14, 1898.

In 1899, Brown ran for county prosecutor. He won handily due to his willingness to make a speech at bullet point. In 1900, Brown sold his law practice and the Spencer Courier, then bought the Harrodsburg Democrat. in Harrodsburg, Kentucky. He only defended at one last trial, and then stopped practicing law.

In 1907, Brown was elected president of the Kentucky Press association. He used his new position to promote a consumer protection law in Kentucky against false advertising. Several other states in the region copied his idea. After his stepfather died on December 10, 1908, Brown decided to buy a winter home in Florida to be near his mother.

== In St. Petersburg ==
After five days in St. Peterburg, Brown bought the Evening Independent, named for its print time of 4:00 pm. His wife helped Brown double the paper's subscriptions. in 1909, Brown joined the Charter committee to create a new city charter, which was ratified in March. He also advocated for a hospital in the city.

On September 1, 1910, Brown revealed "The Sunshine Offer." He proclaimed that every day the sun does not shine in St. Petersburg, he would give his paper away for free. Within six weeks, Brown had to give away two free papers, due to a hurricane. Brown averaged four free papers every year the Independent was published.

In late 1910, Brown sold the Harrodsburg Democrat and bought a permanent residence in St. Petersburg.

In 1911, Brown successfully advocated for the creation of Pinellas County to cover the Pinellas Peninsula. Brown, as the President of the Board of Trade, commissioned a road through the new county. During its construction, Brown discovered that the road contractors had used inferior bricks and cheated the country.

Brown exposed the road scandal, but created political enemies. One commissioner wrote an editorial in the St. Petersburg Times that allegedly defamed both Brown and his son Chauncey. Brown then threatened to shoot the commissioner dead. The commissioner filed a criminal complaint and Brown was eventually indicted for his threat. After a trial, Brown was acquitted, The Times published an apology the next day, along with the Independent's front-page coverage of the trial.

== Military and civic affairs ==
In December 1913, Lew invested in an airline to get people across Tampa Bay. On July 23, 1916, Brown helped revive the Yacht Club.

At the start of World War I began, Florida Governor Sidney Catts appointed Brown as Captain of the Home Guard for Pinellas County. Lew initially called for 100 men to enlist for one company, but he soon had four and the four elected him to be the commissioner. Catts later promoted Brown to major.

On October 25, 1921, St. Petersburg was hit by the Tampa Bay Hurricane and its recreational pier was destroyed. Brown launched a campaign to rebuild it, raising $300,000 to do so. The new pier was finished January 1922 at a final cost of almost $1,000,000.

== Later years and death ==
On August 14, 1923, a new charter was ratified by the commission, which Brown chartered while he was the president of the commission. It reduced the power of the mayor and allowed commission members to be elected by popular vote. On August 21, Brown immersed himself in a political fight over the Nolan Plan for too much control over city development. Unlike most political fights he participated in, he lost his bid to remove the Nolan Plan.

On December 16, 1927, the city of St. Petersburg celebrated one year of sunshine, in which time no free papers were given. Earlier that year, Lew had ceded the positions for Editor and president over to Chauncey.

In January 1941, Mollie Brown died. On August 16, 1944, Lew B. Brown died at 85 years old.

== Publications ==
Brown's poems were published as A Bit of Lace and Other Poems. It was reprinted with the additional poem "Woman," called Woman and Other Poems.

== Racism ==
During his time in Florida, Brown supported the White Primaries, writing that they were necessary "in order to maintain control of city affairs in the hands of the white people."

After the 1914 lynching of John Evans, Brown wrote,

"It should be remembered that John Evans was not a St. Petersburg Negro; he came here only a few weeks ago from Dunnellon. It is usually the Negroes that stray here and stay only a short while who commit crimes. The bulk of St. Petersburg negroes are honest, principled people who are industrious and well behaved."

In Brown's poem "To a Mulatto", he calls a mulatto child an abomination and states that the black in a mulatto's blood was somehow inferior to the white blood. He implies that whites have an obligation to not produce such children.

Due to Brown's racist opinions, there were protests in August 2000 when the City of St. Petersburg announced plans to erect a statue of Brown on the St. Petersburg Pier. In a compromise, the statue became that of a child selling the Evening Independent, with Brown mentioned on the plaque.

== Bibliography ==
- Arsenault, Ray. St.Petersburg and the Florida Dream. Virginia Beach: The Donning Company, 1988. Print.
- Baker, Rick. Mangroves to Major League. St.Petersburg: Southern Heritage Press, 2000. Print.
- Bennet, Lennie. "A statue cast in controversy." St.Petersburg Times 13 August 2000. 3 December 2012. <http://www.sptimes.com/News/081300/SouthPinellas/A_statue_cast_in_cont.shtml>
- Brown, Lew B. A Bit of Lace and Other Poems. St.Petersburg 1928. Print.
- Grismer, Karl H. The Story of St.Petersburg. St.Petersburg: P.K. Smith & Company, 1948. Print.
- Wilson. "Days of Fear: A Lynching in St.Petersburg." St. Petersburg Evening Independent [St.Petersburg] 14 November 1914. 19.
- Zaiser, Marion (1960). The Beneficent Blaze. New York: Pageant Press.
