= Estes Mann =

American architect (1894–1958)

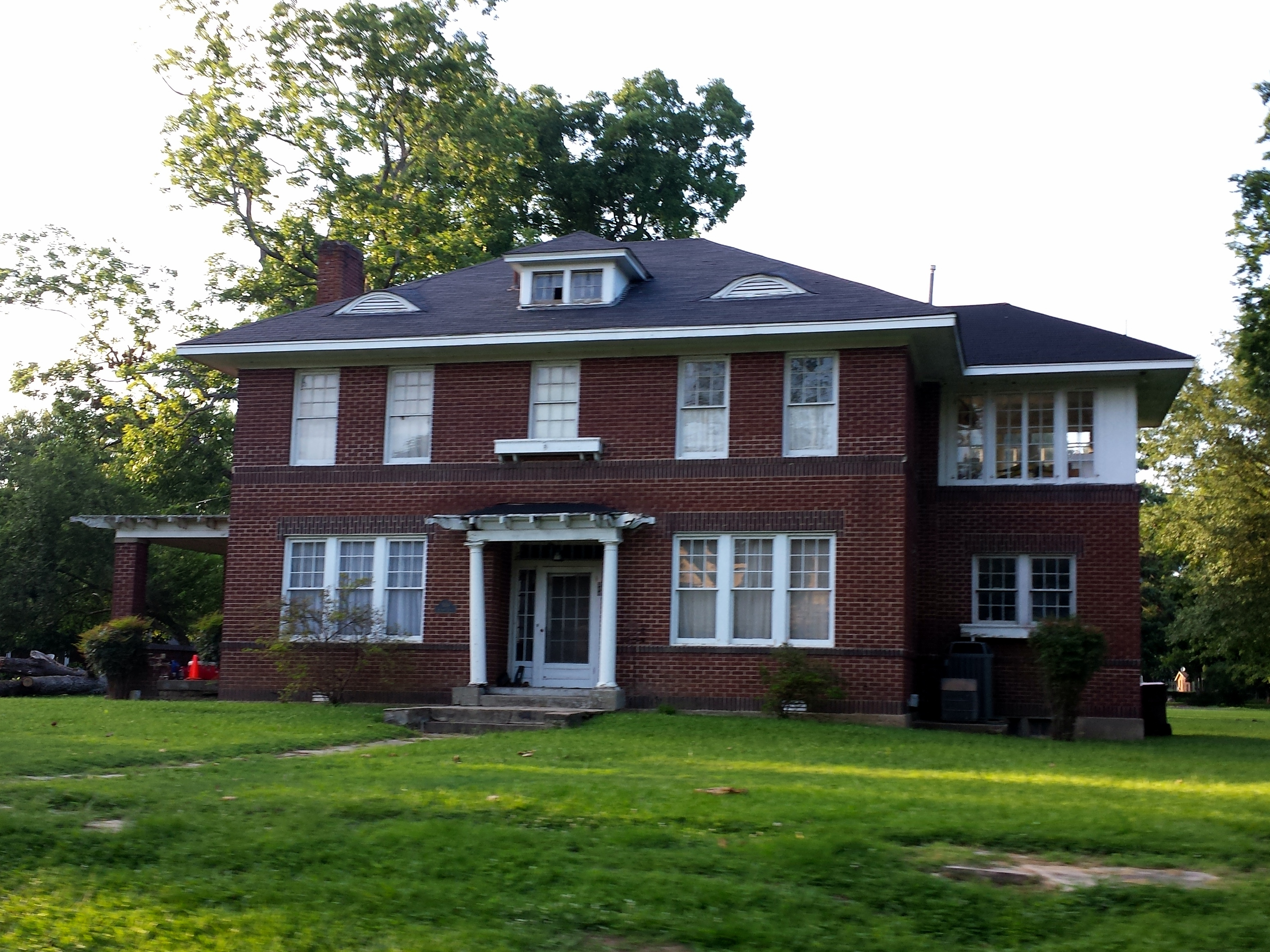
Jefferies-Crabtree House

Estes Wilson Mann Sr. (September 14, 1894 – February 13, 1958) was an American architect based in Memphis, Tennessee. Several buildings he designed are listed on the National Register of Historic Places.

Mann was originally from Marianna, Arkansas. He studied at the Armour Institute in Chicago graduating in 1916. He worked as an architect in Memphis from 1919 until his death in 1958.

Early in his career, Mann worked with M. P. Renfro in Denison, Iowa and with T. H. Albright (more likely J.H. Albright who died in 1922?) in Fort Dodge, Iowa. Renfro was also active in Porterville, California. He started his own firm in Memphis (Mann & Gatling), a partnership that lasted from 1919 until 1922 with projects in Tennessee, Mississippi, and Arkansas.

Mann bought out Gatling in 1922 and shifted his practice to mostly residential work. George L. Richardson worked with him out of the Exchange Building in Memphis in 1928.

In his thesis paper Architects in Tennessee until 1930, A Dictionary, preservationist and educator Joseph Lucian Herdon credits Mann with introducing the English Bungalow architecture and Spanish Colonial architecture styles to Memphis. Mann is credited with designing more than 1,800 residences before 1936. He was a member of several professional organizations. He is buried in Elmwood Cemetery in Memphis.

== Work ==
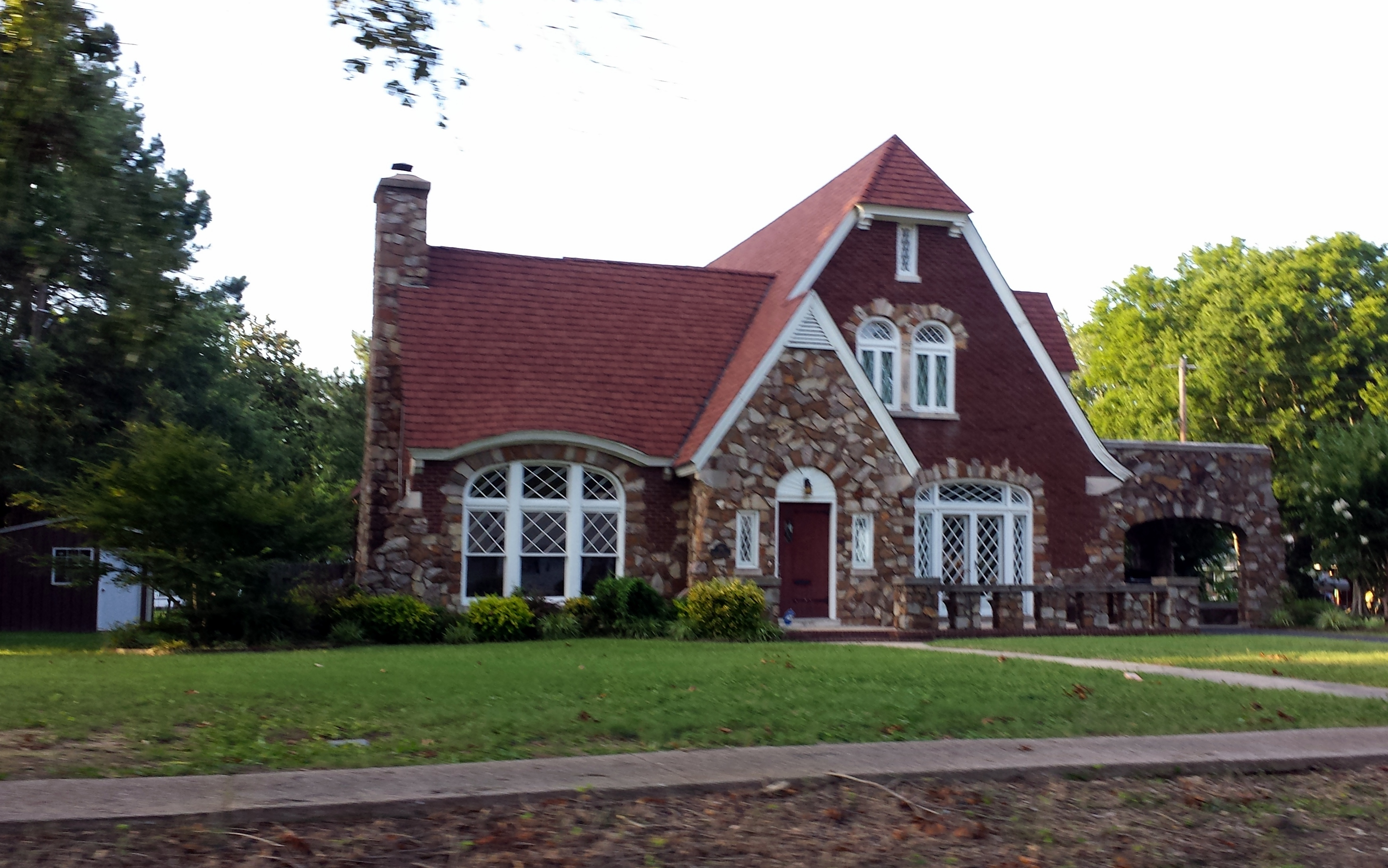
Bateman-Griffith House

- Bateman-Griffith House (1930) at 316 Jefferson Street in Clarendon, Arkansas, NRHP listed
- Abramson House for Rue Abramson at 127 Crescent Heights in Holly Grove, AR NRHP listed
- Jefferies-Crabtree House NRHP listed

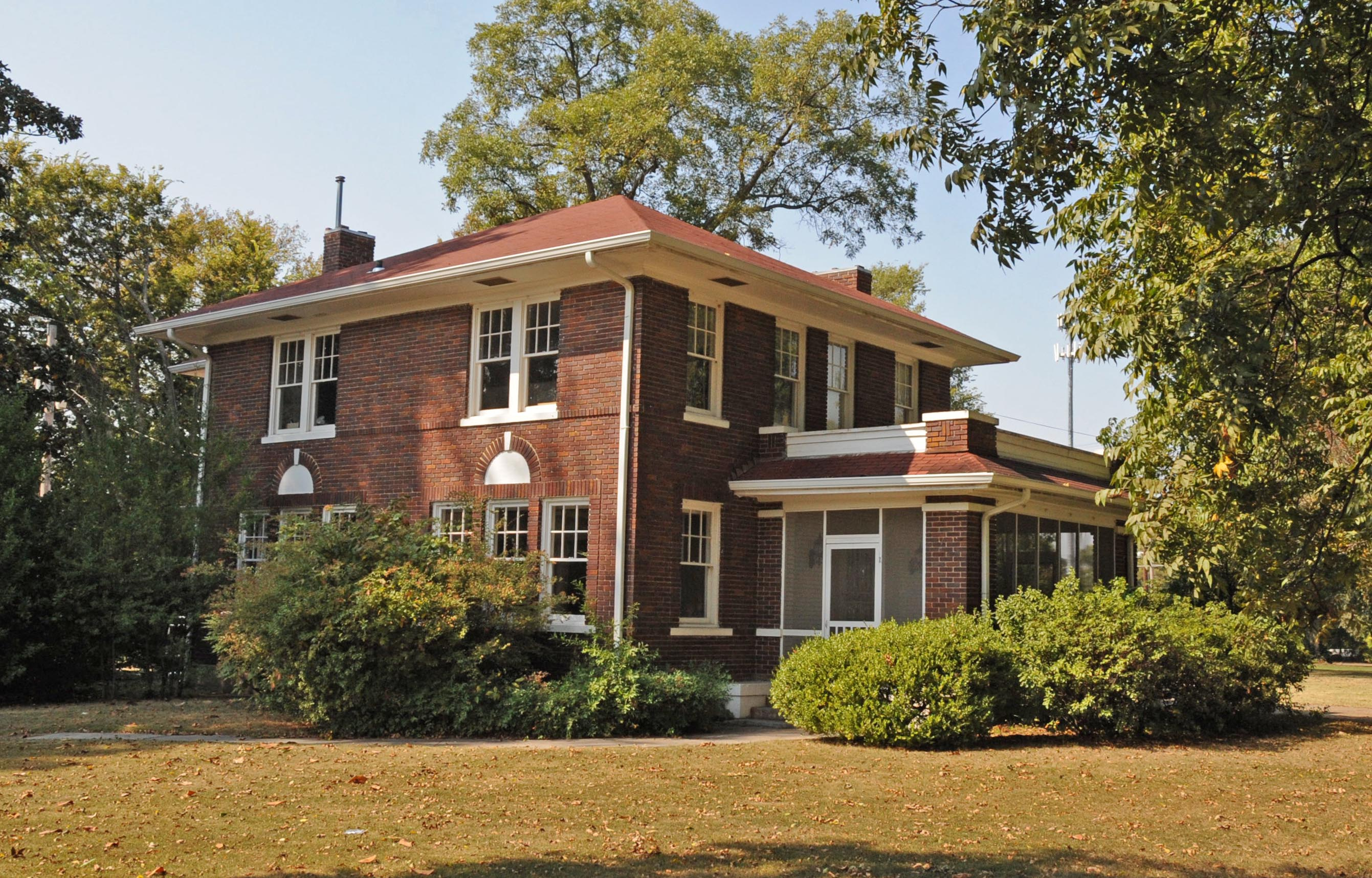
Campbell House (Forrest City, Arkansas)

- Campbell House, 305 N. Forrest St. Forrest City, AR NRHP listed
- Collison House, 206 N. Main St. Bald Knob, AR NRHP listed
- Building at 38 Poplar Street in Marianna, Arkansas
- Methodist Episcopal Church, South in Marianna, Arkansas interior remodel (1949)
- John H. McFadden House (1940 remodel) Bartlett, Tennessee in Shelby County, Tennessee NRHP listed
