= Bateman-Griffith House =

Historic house in Arkansas, United States

- U.S. National Register of Historic Places
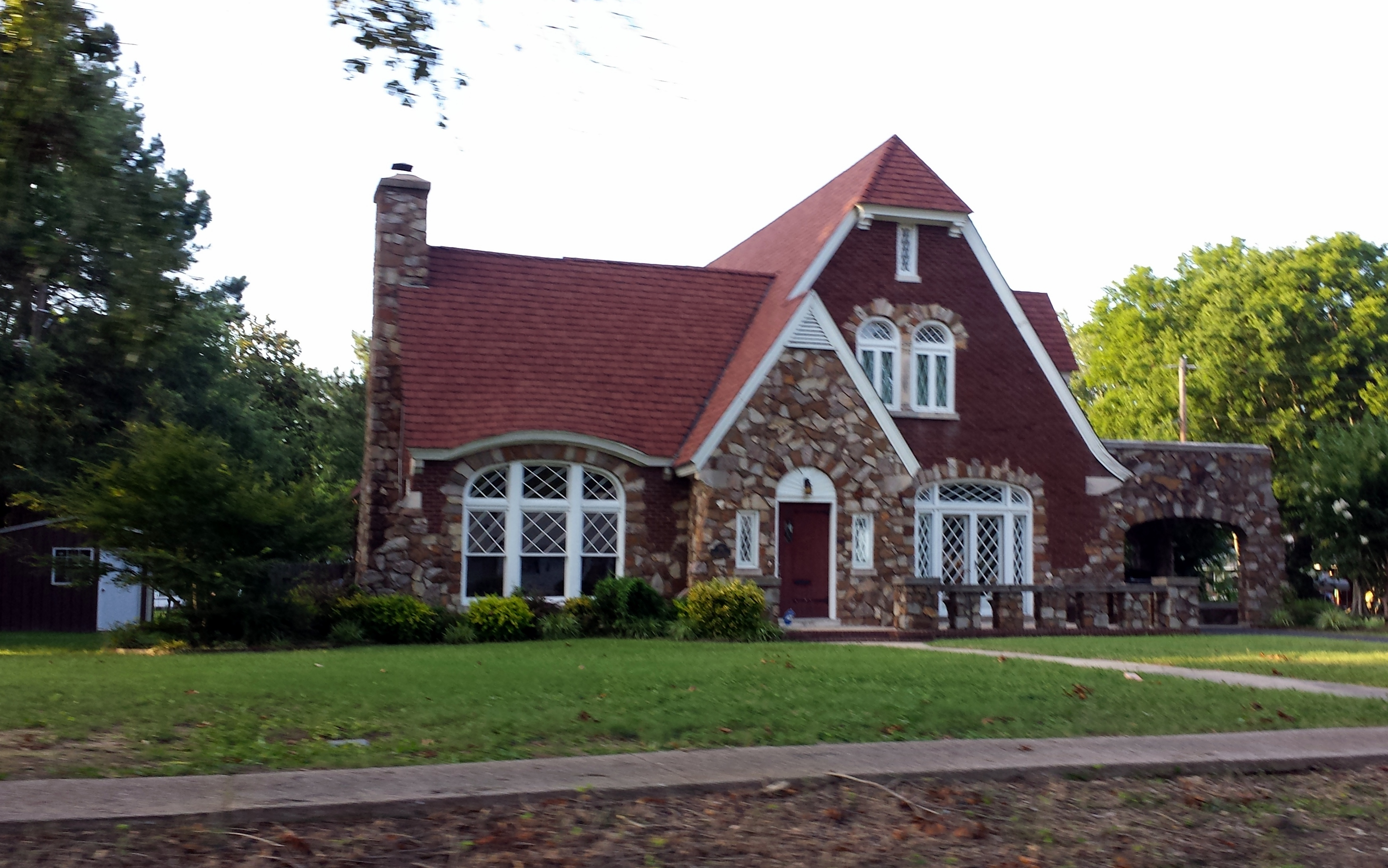

- Location within Arkansas Location within the United States
- Location: 316 Jefferson St., Clarendon, Arkansas
- Coordinates: 34°41′56″N 91°18′59″W
- Area: less than one acre
- Built: 1930
- Architect: Mann & Gatling (Estes Mann)
- Architectural style: Tudor Revival
- MPS: Clarendon MRA
- NRHP reference No.: 84000184
- Added to NRHP: November 1, 1984

The Bateman-Griffith House is a historic house at 316 Jefferson Street in Clarendon, Arkansas, United States. It is a brick and stone two-story structure, with a steeply pitched gable roof, with a long single-story section projecting to one side, and a stone-arch porte cochere on the other. Built in 1930, it is a locally distinctive example of Tudor Revival architecture, designed by Memphis, Tennessee architect Estes Mann of the firm Mann & Gatling.

The house was listed on the National Register of Historic Places in 1984.

== See also ==
- National Register of Historic Places listings in Monroe County, Arkansas
