= Campbell House (Forrest City, Arkansas) =

Historic house in Arkansas, United States

- U.S. National Register of Historic Places
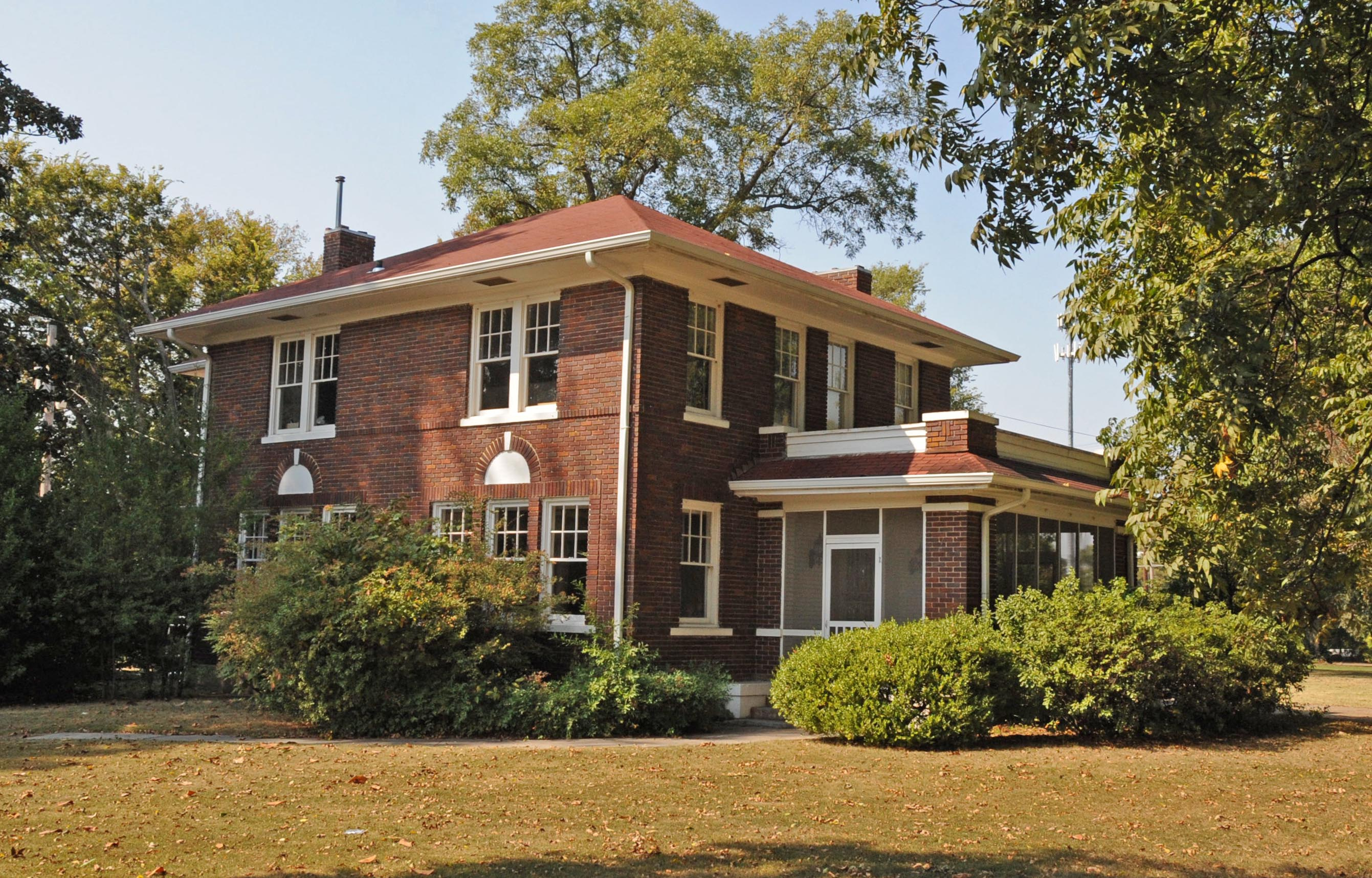

- Location within Arkansas Location within the United States
- Location: 305 N. Forrest St., Forrest City, Arkansas
- Coordinates: 35°0′49″N 90°47′3″W
- Area: less than one acre
- Built: 1917
- Architect: Estes Mann
- Architectural style: Prairie School
- NRHP reference No.: 06000841
- Added to NRHP: December 21, 2006

The Campbell House is a historic house at 305 North Forrest Street in Forrest City, Arkansas. It is a two-story brick building, exhibiting classic Prairie School features including a low-pitch hip roof and wide eaves. It was built in 1917 by William Wilson Campbell, a leading banker and businessman in Forrest City, and remains in the hands of the Junior Auxiliary of St. Francis County. It was designed by Estes Mann.

It was severely damaged by fire in 1927, and had a large addition added in 1959. Campbell played host to a number of notable people, including Will Rogers and Governor Winthrop Rockefeller.

The house was listed on the National Register of Historic Places in 2006.

== See also ==
- National Register of Historic Places listings in St. Francis County, Arkansas
