= Evening Independent =

St. Petersburg, Florida's first daily newspaper

The Evening Independent
- The front page of the final edition of The Evening Independent on November 7, 1986
- Type: Daily newspaper
- Owner: Thomson Corporation
- Founded: November 1907
- Ceased publication: November 1986
- OCLC number: 2720408

The Evening Independent was St. Petersburg, Florida's first daily newspaper. The sister evening newspaper of the St. Petersburg Times, it was launched as a weekly newspaper in March 1906 under the ownership of Willis B. Powell. In November 1907, it became a daily paper as the St. Petersburg Evening Independent.

== History ==
The newspaper was known for its "Sunshine Offer", which was first enacted in 1910 by Lew Brown as a way to publicize St. Petersburg as "The Sunshine City". The paper offered copies free following days without sunshine in St. Petersburg. From 1910 until the paper folded in 1986, the Evening Independent made good on its offer 296 times.

The Evening Independent was acquired by the Times in 1962, when its previous owner, the Thomson newspaper chain, threatened to close it down. Roy Thomson had originally bought the Independent so he would have a place to moor his yacht.

The Evening Independent was merged into the Times in November 1986, initially as part of the Times's "City Times and Independent" section; the "Independent" name would soon be dropped.

Every issue of the Evening Independent, along with the Times, is available for viewing on Google News Archive.
