= Jefferies-Crabtree House =

Historic house in Arkansas, United States

- U.S. National Register of Historic Places
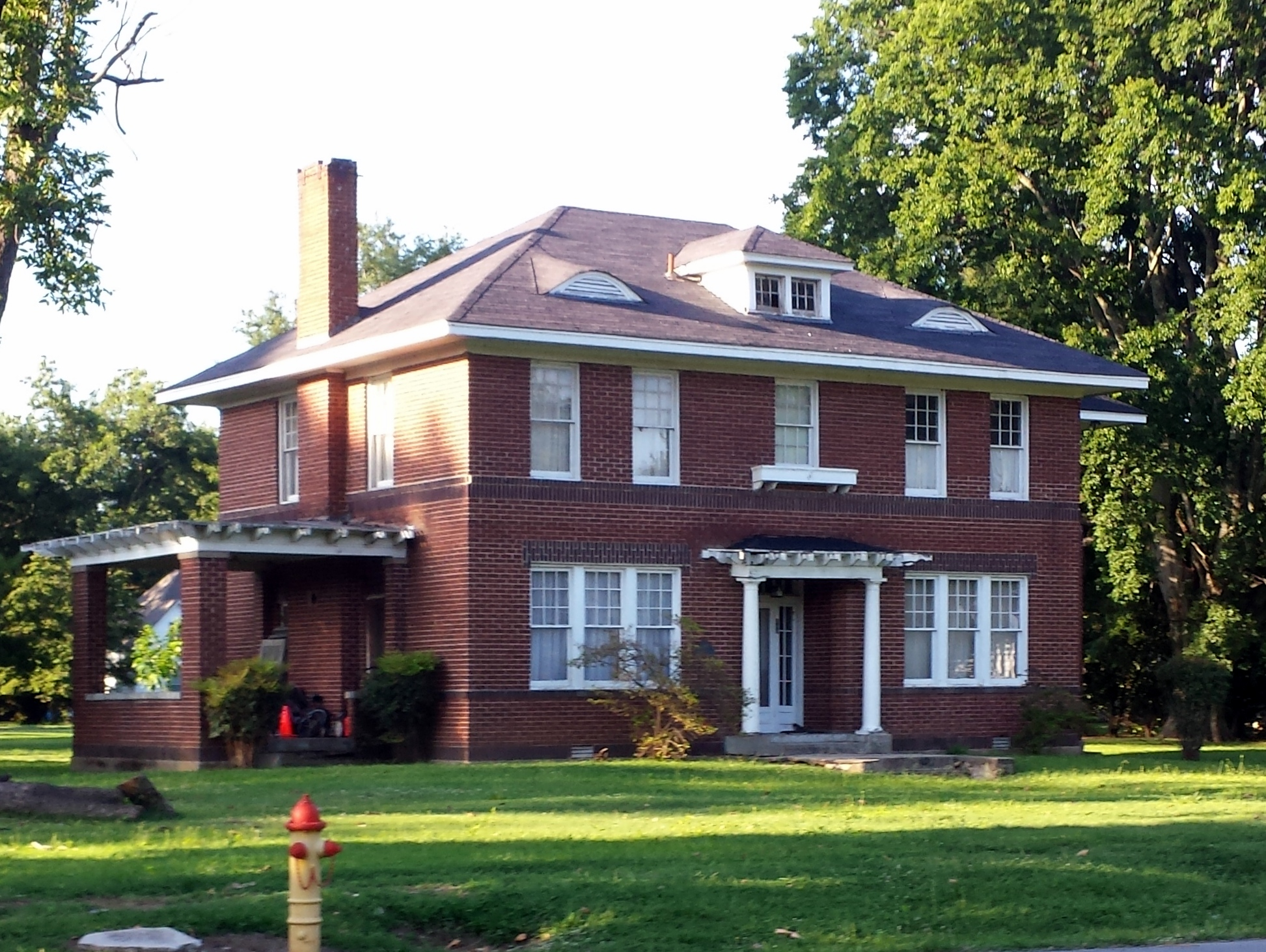

- Location within Arkansas Location within the United States
- Location: 300 Jefferson St., Clarendon, Arkansas
- Coordinates: 34°41′55″N 91°18′59″W
- Area: less than one acre
- Built: 1923
- Architect: Estes Mann
- Architectural style: Colonial Revival
- MPS: Clarendon MRA
- NRHP reference No.: 84000192
- Added to NRHP: November 1, 1984

The Jefferies-Crabtree House is a historic house at 300 Jefferson Street in Clarendon, Arkansas. It is a two-story red brick structure, with a hip roof pierced by a central shed-roof dormer and a pair of eyebrow louvered attic vents. The front facade is symmetrically arranged, with tripled sash windows on either side of the center entrance, which is recessed and has a projecting narrow portico supported by slender round columns. The house was designed by Estes Mann whose practice was based in Memphis, Tennessee, and was built in 1923 for Alfred Jefferies, whose family owned mercantile and lumber businesses.

The house was listed on the National Register of Historic Places (as "Jefferies-Craptree House") in 1984.

== See also ==
- National Register of Historic Places listings in Monroe County, Arkansas
