= Mann House (Forrest City, Arkansas) =

Historic house in Arkansas, United States

- U.S. National Register of Historic Places
- Location within Arkansas Location within the United States
- Nearest city: Forrest City, Arkansas
- Coordinates: 35°00′17″N 90°46′13″W
- Area: less than one acre
- Built: 1913
- Architect: Charles L. Thompson
- Architectural style: Colonial Revival
- NRHP reference No.: 82000937
- Added to NRHP: December 22, 1982

The Mann House is a historic house at 422 Forrest Street in Forrest City, Arkansas. Designed by Charles L. Thompson and built in 1913, it is one of the firm's finest examples of Colonial Revival architecture. The front facade features an imposing Greek temple portico with two-story Ionic columns supporting a fully pedimented gable with dentil molding. The main entrance, sheltered by this portico, is flanked by sidelight windows and topped by a fanlight transom with diamond-pattern lights.

The house was listed on the National Register of Historic Places in 1982.

== See also ==
- National Register of Historic Places listings in St. Francis County, Arkansas
