= Widener, Arkansas =

- Town
- Location of Widener in St. Francis County, Arkansas.
- Coordinates: 35°01′25″N 90°40′55″W
- Country: United States
- State: Arkansas
- County: St. Francis

Area
  - Total: 0.54 sq mi (1.41 km^{2})
  - Land: 0.54 sq mi (1.41 km^{2})
  - Water: 0 sq mi (0.00 km^{2})
- Elevation: 200 ft (61 m)

Population (2020)
  - Total: 212
  - Estimate (2025): 202 ▼
  - Density: 389.1/sq mi (150.23/km^{2})
- Time zone: UTC-6 (Central (CST))
  - Summer (DST): UTC-5 (CDT)
- FIPS code: 05-75560
- GNIS feature ID: 2406885

Widener is a town in St. Francis County, Arkansas, United States. The population was 212 at the 2020 census, a decline from 273 in 2010.

== Geography ==
According to the United States Census Bureau, the town has a total area of 1.3 km^{2} (0.5 mi^{2}), all land.

== Demographics ==
Historical population
Census	Pop.	Note	%±
1910	245		—
1920	449		83.3%
1930	235		−47.7%
1940	225		−4.3%
1950	187		−16.9%
1960	203		8.6%
1970	292		43.8%
1980	316		8.2%
1990	381		20.6%
2000	335		−12.1%
2010	273		−18.5%
2020	212		−22.3%
2025 (est.)	202	▼	−4.7%
U.S. Decennial Census

=== Racial and ethnic composition ===
Widener town, Arkansas – Racial and ethnic composition Note: the US Census treats Hispanic/Latino as an ethnic category. This table excludes Latinos from the racial categories and assigns them to a separate category. Hispanics/Latinos may be of any race.
Race / Ethnicity (NH = Non-Hispanic)	Pop 2000	Pop 2010	Pop 2020	% 2000	% 2010	% 2020
White alone (NH)	104	90	66	31.04%	32.97%	31.13%
Black or African American alone (NH)	223	164	136	66.57%	60.07%	64.15%
Native American or Alaska Native alone (NH)	0	0	0	0.00%	0.00%	0.00%
Asian alone (NH)	0	0	3	0.00%	0.00%	1.42%
Native Hawaiian or Pacific Islander alone (NH)	0	0	0	0.00%	0.00%	0.00%
Other race alone (NH)	0	1	0	0.00%	0.37%	0.00%
Mixed race or Multiracial (NH)	0	4	5	0.00%	1.47%	2.36%
Hispanic or Latino (any race)	8	14	2	2.39%	5.13%	0.94%
Total	335	273	212	100.00%	100.00%	100.00%

=== 2020 census ===
As of the 2020 United States census, there were 212 people, 90 households, and 58 families residing in the town.

=== 2000 census ===
As of the census of 2000, there were 335 people, 111 households, and 81 families residing in the town. The population density was 258.7/km^{2} (663.9/mi^{2}). There were 129 housing units at an average density of 99.6/km^{2} (255.7/mi^{2}). The racial makeup of the town was 31.94% White, 67.16% Black or African American, 0.30% Asian, 0.60% from other races. 2.39% of the population were Hispanic or Latino of any race.

There were 111 households, out of which 39.6% had children under the age of 18 living with them, 42.3% were married couples living together, 22.5% had a female householder with no husband present, and 27.0% were non-families. 20.7% of all households were made up of individuals, and 6.3% had someone living alone who was 65 years of age or older. The average household size was 3.02 and the average family size was 3.65.

In the town, the population was spread out, with 36.7% under the age of 18, 9.3% from 18 to 24, 26.9% from 25 to 44, 16.1% from 45 to 64, and 11.0% who were 65 years of age or older. The median age was 28 years. For every 100 females, there were 92.5 males. For every 100 females age 18 and over, there were 91.0 males.

The median income for a household in the town was $20,833, and the median income for a family was $24,375. Males had a median income of $23,929 versus $20,625 for females. The per capita income for the town was $12,135. About 34.2% of families and 38.7% of the population were below the poverty line, including 41.1% of those under age 18 and 34.1% of those age 65 or over.

== Education ==
Forrest City School District operates public schools serving the community. Forrest City High School is the local high school.
