= Collison House (Bald Knob, Arkansas) =

Historic house in Arkansas, United States

- U.S. National Register of Historic Places
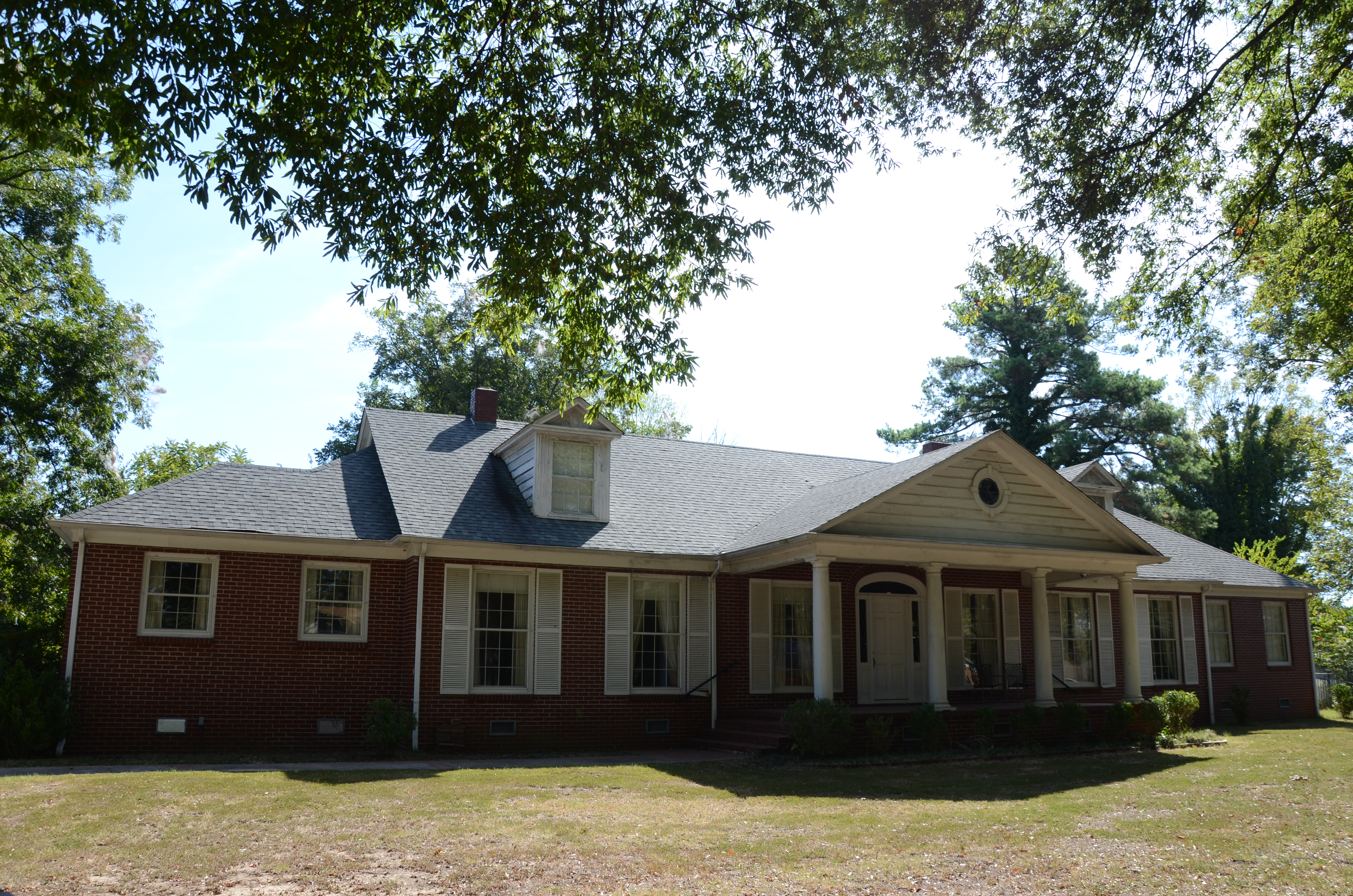

- Location within Arkansas Location within the United States
- Location: 206 N. Main St., Bald Knob, Arkansas
- Coordinates: 35°18′52″N 91°34′2″W
- Area: less than one acre
- Built: 1951
- Built by: Ben Cranford
- Architect: Estes W. Mann
- Architectural style: Ranch
- NRHP reference No.: 08000489
- Added to NRHP: May 29, 2008

The Collison House is a historic house at 260 North Main Street in Bald Knob, Arkansas. It is a 1 1/2-story brick structure, with a side gable roof. It is a traditional linear ranch house with Colonial Revival features, including its main entry, which has sidelight windows and a fanlight above. The house was designed by Estes W. Mann and built in 1950 for Mrs. June Collison. The house is notable as one of the first ranch houses to be built in its neighborhood.

The house was listed on the National Register of Historic Places in 2008.

== See also ==
- National Register of Historic Places listings in White County, Arkansas
