= Forrest City Municipal Airport =

Forrest City Municipal Airport Hutfly Airport
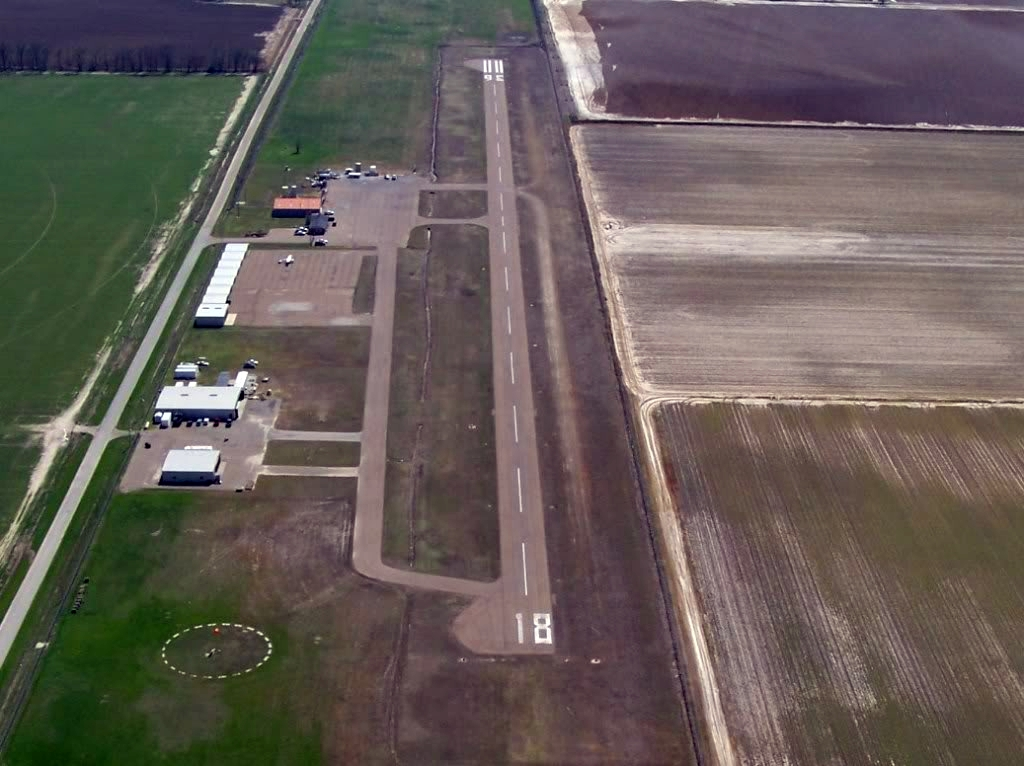
- IATA: FCY; ICAO: KFCY; FAA LID: FCY

Summary
- Airport type: Public
- Owner: City of Forrest City
- Serves: Forrest City, Arkansas
- Elevation AMSL: 249 ft (76 m)
- Coordinates: 34°56′31″N 090°46′30″W

Map
- Location of airport in Arkansas FCY (the United States)

Runways
Direction	Length		Surface
Direction	ft	m	Surface
18/36	3,014	919	Asphalt

Statistics (2010)
- Aircraft operations: 44,300
- Source: Federal Aviation Administration

Forrest City Municipal Airport, also known as Hutfly Airport (IATA: FCY, ICAO: KFCY, FAA LID: FCY), is a city-owned public-use airport located 4 nautical miles (4.6 mi; 7.4 km) south of the central business district of Forrest City, in St. Francis County, Arkansas, United States. This airport is included in the FAA's National Plan of Integrated Airport Systems for 2011–2015, which categorized it as a general aviation facility.

== Facilities and aircraft ==
Forrest City Municipal Airport covers an area of 80 acres (32 ha) at an elevation of 249 feet (76 m) above mean sea level. It has one runway, designated 18/36 with an asphalt surface measuring 3,014 by 50 feet (919 by 15 m). For the 12-month period ending July 31, 2010, the airport had 44,300 aircraft operations, an average of 121 per day: 99% general aviation and 1% military.

== See also ==
- List of airports in Arkansas
