= First United Methodist Church (Forrest City, Arkansas) =

Historic church in Arkansas, United States

- U.S. National Register of Historic Places
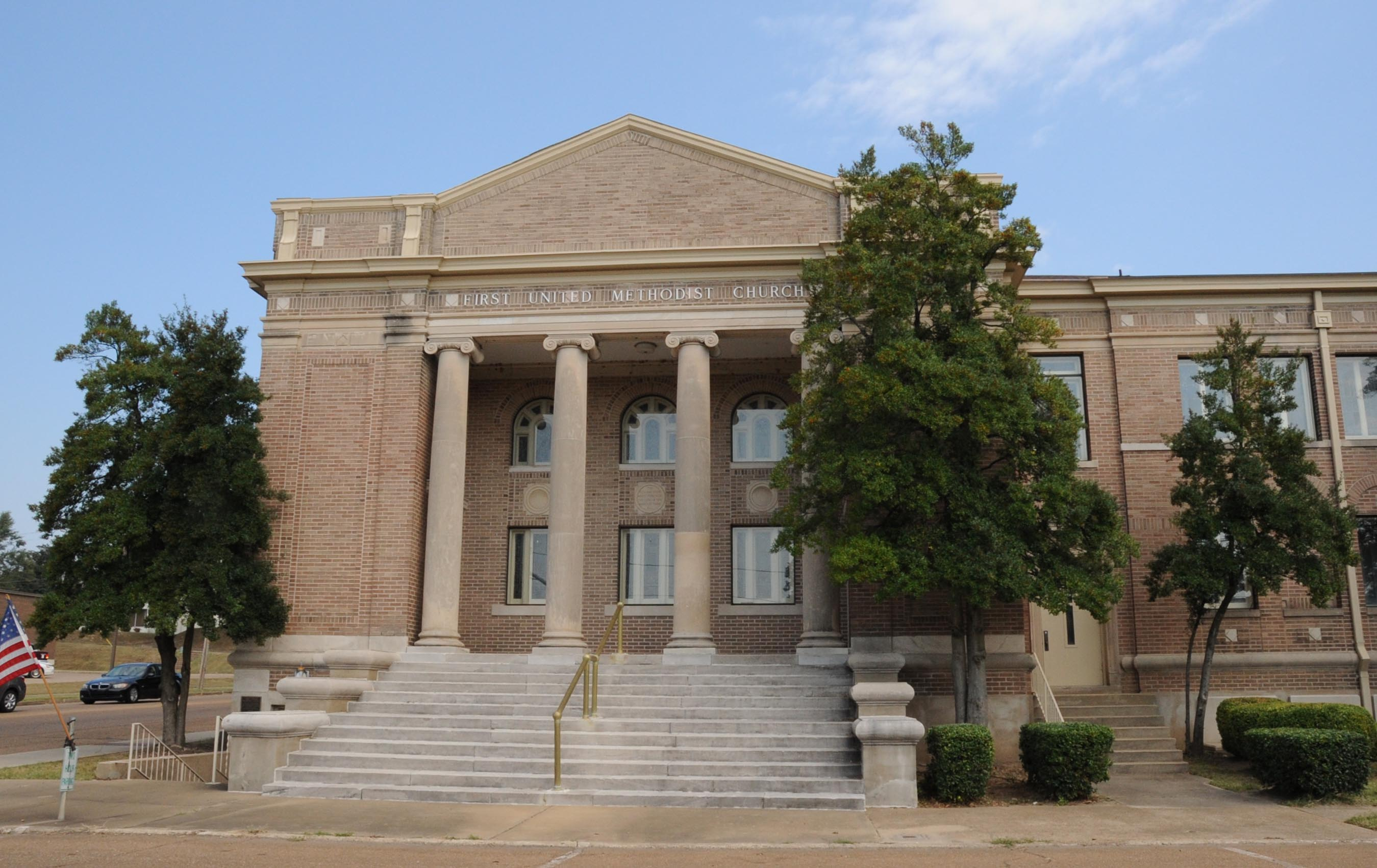

- Location within Arkansas Location within the United States
- Location: 101 S. Izard St., Forrest City, Arkansas
- Coordinates: 35°0′33″N 90°47′1″W
- Area: less than one acre
- Built: 1917
- Built by: J.C. Jones
- Architect: John Gaisford
- Architectural style: Classical Revival
- NRHP reference No.: 94000467
- Added to NRHP: May 19, 1994

The First United Methodist Church is a historic church at 101 S. Izard Street in Forrest City, Arkansas. It is a two-story brick structure, designed by Memphis architect John Gaisford and built in 1917 as the second church for its congregation. One of Gaisford's last designs, it is Classical Revival in style, with a Greek-style temple front with full-height Ionic columns supporting a triangular pediment, with limestone trim accenting the brickwork.

The building was listed on the National Register of Historic Places in 1994.

== See also ==
- National Register of Historic Places listings in St. Francis County, Arkansas
