= Hughes Water Tower =

Historic water tower in Arkansas, US

- U.S. National Register of Historic Places
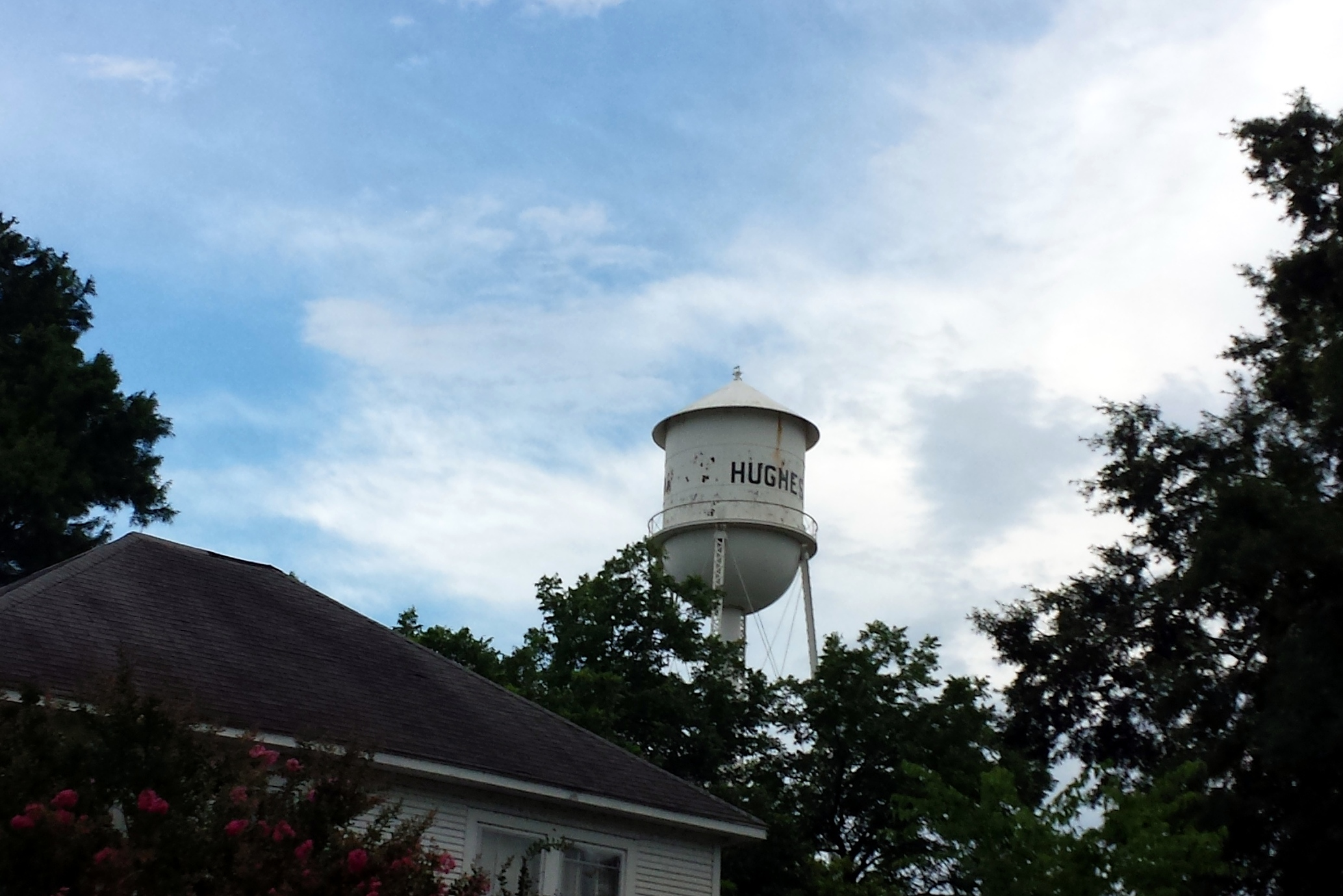

- Location within Arkansas Location within the United States
- Location: Church St., Hughes, Arkansas
- Coordinates: 34°57′3″N 90°28′21″W
- Area: less than one acre
- Built: 1936
- MPS: New Deal Recovery Efforts in Arkansas MPS
- NRHP reference No.: 06000905
- Added to NRHP: October 5, 2006

The Hughes Water Tower is located on Church Street in Hughes, Arkansas. It is a metal structure consisting of four legs, sloping inward as they rise, which support a roughly cylindrical tower with bowl-shaped bottom and a conical roof. The legs are joined by reinforcing rods to provide stability. A large metal pipe connects the tank to water facilities on the ground, and there is a walkway with railing around the tank. The tower was built in 1936 by the Chicago Bridge and Iron Works Company with funding from the Public Works Administration.

The tower was listed on the National Register of Historic Places in 2006.

== See also ==
- National Register of Historic Places listings in St. Francis County, Arkansas
