= Smith House (Wheatley, Arkansas) =

Historic house in Arkansas, United States

- U.S. National Register of Historic Places
- Location within Arkansas Location within the United States
- Location: Memphis Ave., Wheatly, Arkansas
- Coordinates: 34°54′40″N 91°6′33″W
- Area: less than one acre
- Built: 1919
- Architect: Charles L. Thompson
- Architectural style: Bungalow/American craftsman
- MPS: Thompson, Charles L., Design Collection TR
- NRHP reference No.: 82000938
- Added to NRHP: December 22, 1982

The Smith House is a historic house on Memphis Street in Wheatley, Arkansas. It is a 2 1/2-story wood-frame structure, designed by Charles L. Thompson and built in 1919. It is the most architecturally significant building in the small community, exhibiting Craftsman style elements including exposed rafters, large brackets supporting extended eaves, and half-timbering on its gable ends. The rural setting, on a farm, is also unusual for Thompson's work, which is usually found in residential areas.

The house was listed on the National Register of Historic Places in 1982.

== See also ==
- National Register of Historic Places listings in St. Francis County, Arkansas
