= Stuart Springs =

- U.S. National Register of Historic Places
- Location: Stuart St., Forrest City, Arkansas
- Area: 16 acres (6.5 ha)
- Built: 1900
- NRHP reference No.: 77001502
- Added to NRHP: August 3, 1977

Stuart Springs is a city park in Forrest City, Arkansas. The 16-acre (6.5 ha) park is located on the northeast side of the city, at the end of East Arlington Avenue. The park's main features are three springs, which were developed as a spa around the turn of the 20th century. At Stuart Spring, the largest of the three, there still stand foundational remnants of the brick springhouse. There are no traces left of an adjacent pavilion which was also built. The park now provides passive recreational opportunities, with walkways and playgrounds.

The park was listed on the National Register of Historic Places in 1977.

== See also ==
- National Register of Historic Places listings in St. Francis County, Arkansas
