= Abramson House =

Historic house in Arkansas, United States

- U.S. National Register of Historic Places
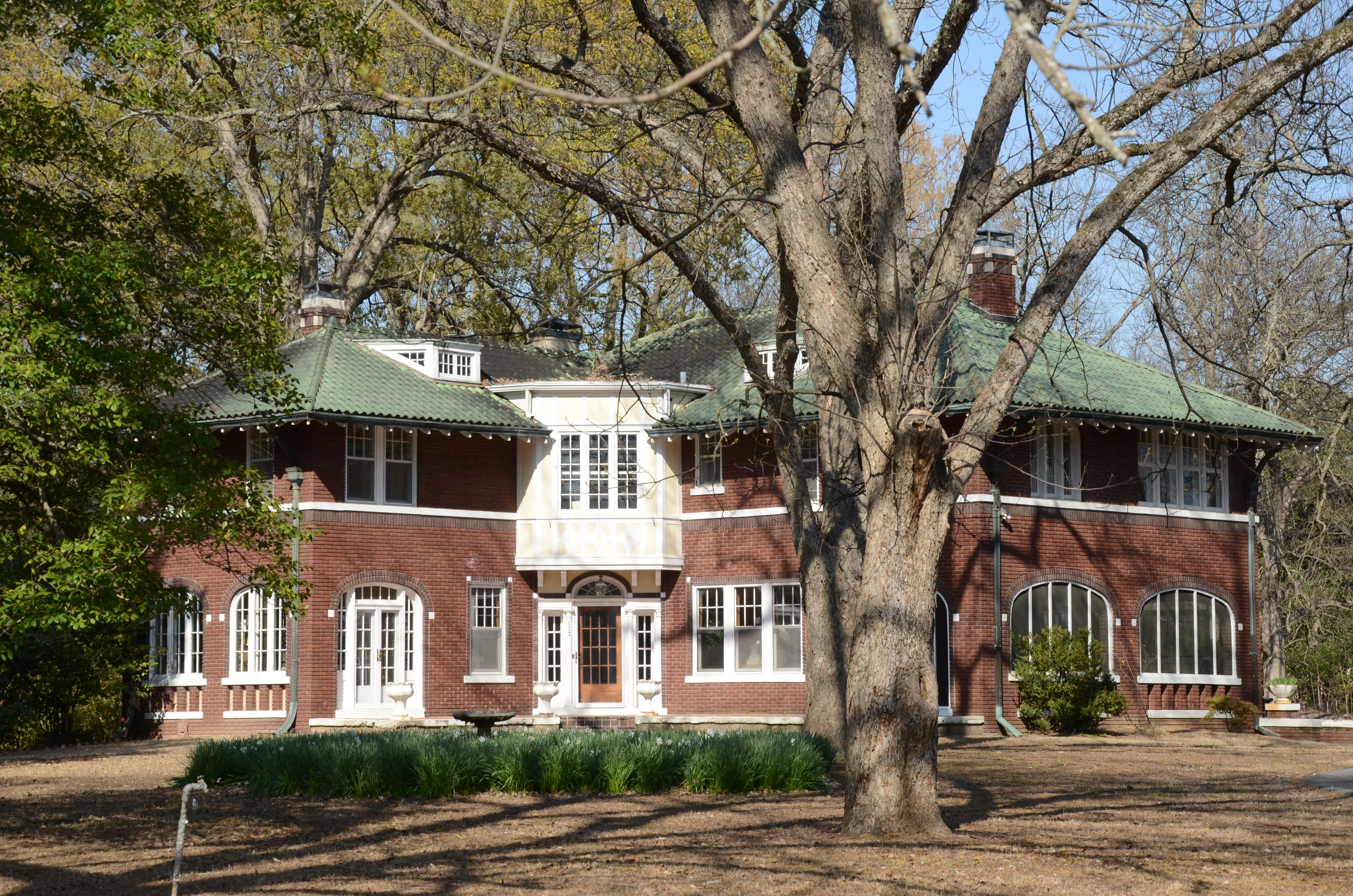

- Location within Arkansas Location within the United States
- Location: 127 Crescent Heights, Holly Grove, Arkansas
- Coordinates: 34°35′29″N 91°11′52″W
- Area: 5 acres (2.0 ha)
- Built: 1921
- Architect: Estes Mann
- Architectural style: Bungalow/craftsman
- NRHP reference No.: 95001092
- Added to NRHP: September 7, 1995

The Abramson House is a historic house at 127 Crescent Heights in Holly Grove, Arkansas. It is a two-story wood-frame structure, with brick veneer walls and a green tile roof. Designed by Memphis, Tennessee architect Estes Mann and built in 1921–22, it is a particularly fine local example of Craftsman style architecture. It is an L-shaped structure, with arched openings (one housing a recessed porch, the other an enclosed former porch) at the ends of one leg, and half-timbered stucco projecting sections with oriel windows.

The house was listed on the National Register of Historic Places in 1995.

== See also ==
- National Register of Historic Places listings in Monroe County, Arkansas
