= Woodruff Electric Cooperative =

Woodruff Electric Cooperative is a non-profit rural electric utility cooperative headquartered in Forrest City, Arkansas, with district offices in Augusta and Moro, Arkansas.

The Cooperative was organized in 1937.

The Cooperative serves portions of seven counties in the state of Arkansas, in a territory generally surrounding Forrest City: Cross, Lee, Monroe, Phillips, Prairie, St. Francis, and Woodruff.

As of September 2005 the Cooperative has more than 4,500 miles of distribution lines, and services over 17,000 accounts.
