= Federal Correctional Complex, Forrest City =

Prison in Arkansas, United States

Coordinates: 34°58′48″N 90°47′57″W

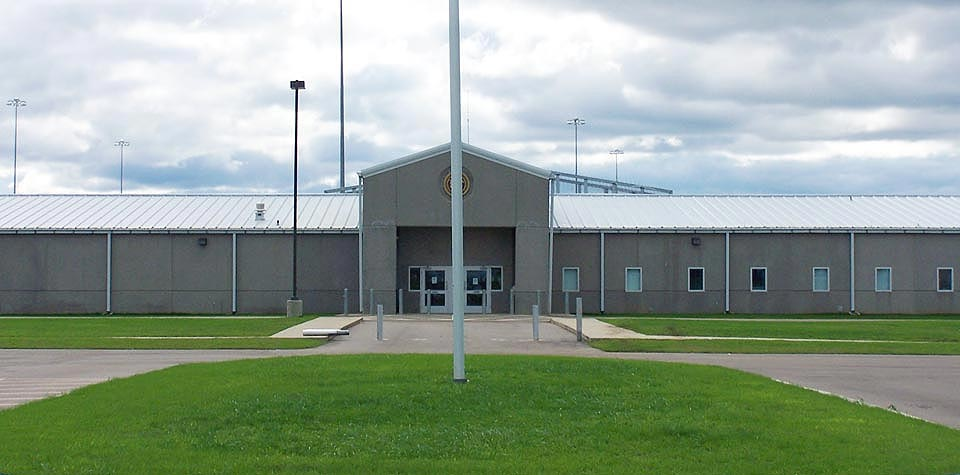
- Interactive map of Federal Correctional Complex, Forrest City
- Location: Forrest City, Arkansas
- Status: Operational
- Security class: Medium, low and minimum-security
- Population: 2,840 (two facilities and prison camp)
- Managed by: Federal Bureau of Prisons

The Federal Correctional Complex, Forrest City (FCC Forrest City) is a United States federal prison complex for male inmates in Arkansas. It is operated by the Federal Bureau of Prisons, a division of the United States Department of Justice.

The complex consists of three facilities:

- SPC Forrest City (Satellite Prison Camp): a minimum-security facility for minimum-security inmates.
- Federal Correctional Institution, Forrest City Low (FCI Forrest City Low): a low-security facility for low-security inmates.
- Federal Correctional Institution, Forrest City Medium (FCI Forrest City Medium): a medium-security facility for medium-security inmates.

== See also ==
- List of U.S. federal prisons
- Federal Bureau of Prisons
- Incarceration in the United States
