= Blackfish Lake Ferry Site =

Archaeological site in Arkansas, United States

- U.S. National Register of Historic Places
- Nearest city: New Shady Grove, Arkansas
- Area: 7.1 acres (2.9 ha)
- MPS: Cherokee Trail of Tears MPS
- NRHP reference No.: 03000195
- Added to NRHP: April 10, 2003

The Blackfish Lake Ferry Site is a historic archaeological site in St. Francis County, Arkansas, United States. It is the only known ferry site along the route of a military road built in the 1820s and 1830s between Memphis, Tennessee, and Little Rock, Arkansas, to be used in the Trail of Tears. The ferry concession was granted to William D. Ferguson, an early settler of the area. This military road was a major route for the removal of Cherokee, Creek and Choctaw populations to the Indian Territory (present-day Oklahoma) and was also used by thousands of west-bound settlers.

The site was listed on the National Register of Historic Places in 2003.

== See also ==
- National Register of Historic Places listings in St. Francis County, Arkansas
