= Jason Jones (wide receiver) =

American gridiron football player (born 1983)

No. 24
- Position: Wide receiver

Personal information
- Born: August 30, 1983 (age 43); Forrest City, Arkansas
- Listed height: 6 ft 1 in (1.85 m)
- Listed weight: 182 lb (83 kg)

Career information
- High school: Forrest City (AR)
- College: Ark.-Pine Bluff
- NFL draft: 2008: undrafted

Career history
- Buffalo Bills (2008)*; BC Lions (2009)*; Arizona Rattlers (2010–2011)*; Sioux Falls Storm (2010); Kansas City Command (2011)*; Allen Wranglers (2011)
- * Offseason or practice squad member only

Awards and highlights
- First-team All-SWAC (2006)
- Stats at ArenaFan.com

Jason Jones (born August 30, 1983) is a former gridiron football wide receiver. He was signed by the Buffalo Bills as an undrafted free agent in 2008. He was released in 2008. He played college football for the Arkansas-Pine Bluff.

Jones was also a member of the Arizona Rattlers and Kansas City Command of the Arena Football League, the BC Lions of the Canadian Football League and the Sioux Falls Storm and Allen Wranglers of the Indoor Football League.
