= 1889 Forrest City riot =

Riot in Forrest City, Arkansas, in 1889

- Part of the nadir of American race relations
- Date: May 18–19, 1889
- Location: Forrest City, Arkansas, United States

Casualties
- Deaths: 4
- Injuries: 2

The 1889 Forrest City riot was a period of civil unrest in Forrest City, Arkansas, United States. The riot began on May 18 and concluded the following day.

The conflict had its roots in recent political developments within St. Francis County, of which Forrest City was the county seat. During the late 1880s, the Union Labor Party, which was made up of labor and agricultural activists from groups such as the Agricultural Wheel, formed an alliance with the Republican Party and won several elected positions in the county government in the 1888 elections. This development upset many white Democrats in the county, as the election saw many African Americans elected on the fusion ticket. The following year, elections were scheduled for the county's school board, and there was a possibility that African Americans could win a majority of seats on the institution. On May 18, election day, a fight broke out between Americus M. Neely, an African American school board member, and a white member of the board at a polling place. In the aftermath, shots were fired by members of both parties, resulting in several deaths. Neely fled the scene and barricaded himself in the offices of his local newspaper, though he was killed by militia members the following day.

Following the riot, African American leaders were driven out of the county and white Democrats regained control. A series of laws passed at the state level in the following years effectively disenfranchised African Americans, and in 1900, all white Democratic candidates in the county ran unopposed. The riot was one of several in the Arkansas Delta region that saw white Americans attempt to stop African Americans from gaining political power, and in 2006, historian James T. Campbell called the event "one of the bloodiest in a series of racist pogroms intended to drive black Arkansans out of politics".

== Background ==
In 1887, the Union Labor Party was established at a meeting of organized labor and agricultural representatives, including members of the Agricultural Wheel, in Cincinnati. In April of the following year, the Arkansas state affiliate of the party held its first meeting. During that year's elections in Arkansas, members of the state party and the Republican Party formed an alliance to challenge the dominant Democratic Party. In St. Francis County, this fusion ticket saw success, with Republican candidates winning the offices of assessor, coroner, and treasurer, and Union Labor candidates becoming county clerk, county judge, and sheriff. Democrats were fearful of this new alliance and in particular the support the movement had from African Americans, with all three of the new Republican officeholders being black. Following the election, local Democrats stated that, unless "some lawful means [was] used to prevent [blacks'] election", African Americans would eventually dominate the county's politics. Around this time, St. Francis County was home to a significant number of African Americans, and by 1890, they would constitute a majority of the population. In May 1889, tensions began to arise in Forrest City, the county seat. At the time, the county school board consisted of five white Democrats and one black Republican, Americus M. Neely, a local black leader and editor of the Advocate, a Republican publication. However, two of the white Democrats terms had expired, with elections scheduled for May 18, and many white county residents were fearful that African Americans would win those open seats and gain a majority on the school board.

== Riot ==
Violence broke out on the afternoon of election day, May 18. At a polling place, a fight broke out between Neely and James Fussell, the president of the school board and one of the Democratic candidates who was seeking reelection. Neely, who was knocked down during the scuffle, went to John Parham, a member of the Union Labor Party and a former sheriff, for protection. City Marshal Frank Folbre, a member of the Democratic Party, attempted to keep the peace before Deputy County Clerk Tom Parham, John's son, arrived and opened fire on some of the men, fatally wounding Folbre. Before dying, Folbre fired at Tom, killing him. In the ensuing shootout, a stray bullet killed Sheriff D. M. Wilson, a former Democrat turned Republican/Union Laborite, while John and Neely were both injured. Following the initial violence, Neely went to the Advocate headquarters and barricaded himself in there with his father, Henry, and younger brother, Ed. Meanwhile, G. W. Ingram, the coroner and a candidate for the school board, fled the county on orders to not return, and the white school board members won unanimous reelection. During the night, shots were fired into the Advocate building. The next morning, Van B. Izard, the colonel of a local militia who had recently been appointed sheriff by Arkansas Governor James Philip Eagle, led a group of men into the Advocate building and arrested Henry and Ed. After a search, Americus was found hiding under the floorboards and was killed when several men opened fire at him. His body was later turned over to family members.

== Aftermath ==
In the aftermath of the riot, white Democrats were able to regain control of county politics through intimidation and voter discrimination. The riot was one of several that occurred around this time in the Arkansas Delta region, with a similar riot in Crittenden County the previous year resulting in all black elected officials being forced out of the county. Many of the African American leaders in St. Francis County left in the riot's aftermath, and many individuals who had been members of the Agricultural Wheel were attacked. In July 1889, during the Wheel's state conference in Hot Springs, Arkansas, the organization condemned the riot, but proceeded to adopt a new constitution that barred African American members from joining the organization. In the early 1890s, Democrats in the state passed laws instituting poll taxes and a white primary that effectively disenfranchised African Americans, as well as many poor whites. By 1900, all white Democratic candidates in St. Francis County ran unopposed. In a 2006 book, historian James T. Campbell referred to the 1889 riot as "one of the bloodiest in a series of racist pogroms intended to drive black Arkansans out of politics".

== See also ==
- List of ethnic riots
- List of incidents of civil unrest in the United States
- Mass racial violence in the United States

== Sources ==
- Campbell, James T. (2006). Middle Passages: African American Journeys to Africa, 1787-2005. Preface by David Levering Lewis. New York City: Penguin Books. ISBN 978-0-14-311198-6.
- Graves, John William (1990). Town and Country: Race Relations in an Urban-Rural Context, Arkansas, 1865–1905. Fayetteville, Arkansas: University of Arkansas Press. ISBN 978-1-68226-138-5.
- Hild, Matthew (March 28, 2022). "Union Labor Party". Encyclopedia of Arkansas. OCLC 68194233. Archived from the original on November 27, 2022.
- Lancaster, Guy (2014). Racial Cleansing in Arkansas, 1883–1924: Politics, Land, Labor, and Criminality. Lanham, Maryland: Lexington Books. ISBN 978-0-7391-9548-2.
- Polston, Mike (December 5, 2022). "Forrest City (St. Francis County)". Encyclopedia of Arkansas. OCLC 68194233. Archived from the original on January 8, 2023.
- Stockley, Grif (2009). Ruled by Race: Black/White Relations in Arkansas From Slavery to the Present. Fayetteville, Arkansas: University of Arkansas Press. ISBN 978-1-61075-356-2.
- Welch, Melanie K. (February 7, 2022). "Forrest City Riot of 1889". Encyclopedia of Arkansas. OCLC 68194233. Archived from the original on October 20, 2022.
