= Madison, Arkansas =

- City
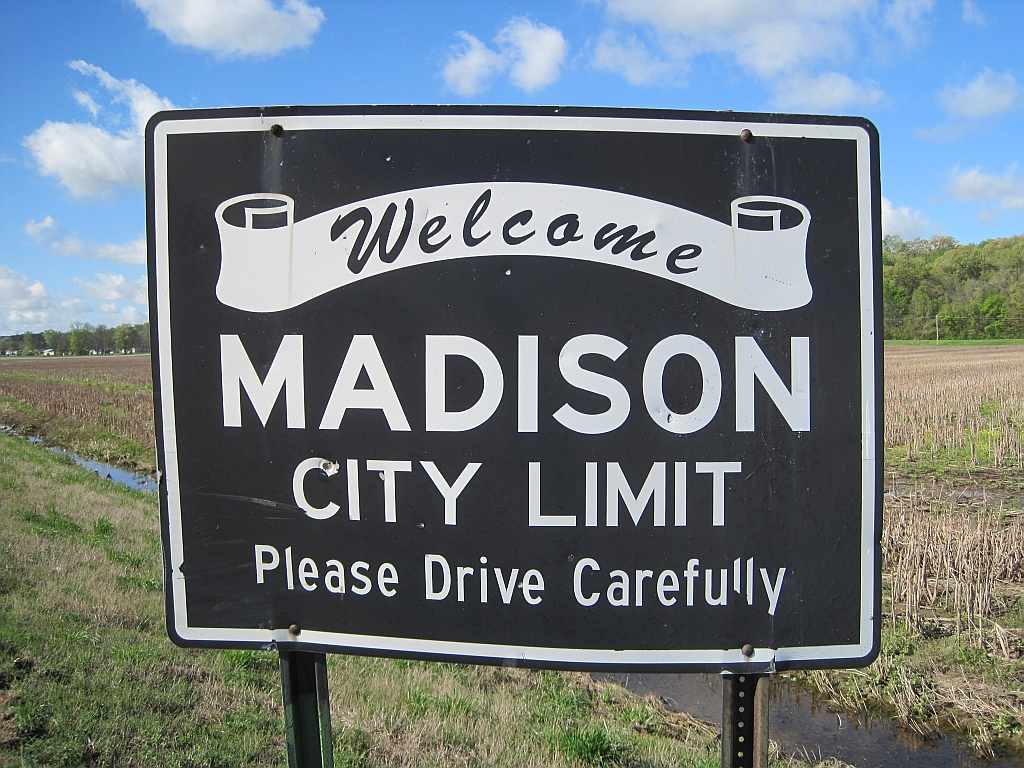

- Location of Madison in St. Francis County, Arkansas.
- Coordinates: 35°01′35″N 90°44′27″W
- Country: United States
- State: Arkansas
- County: St. Francis

Area
  - Total: 2.55 sq mi (6.61 km^{2})
  - Land: 2.48 sq mi (6.43 km^{2})
  - Water: 0.069 sq mi (0.18 km^{2})
- Elevation: 289 ft (88 m)

Population (2020)
  - Total: 759
  - Estimate (2025): 713 ▼
  - Density: 305.6/sq mi (117.98/km^{2})
- Time zone: UTC-6 (Central (CST))
  - Summer (DST): UTC-5 (CDT)
- FIPS code: 05-43280
- GNIS feature ID: 2404990

Madison is a city in St. Francis County, Arkansas, United States. As of the 2020 census, Madison had a population of 759.

== Geography ==
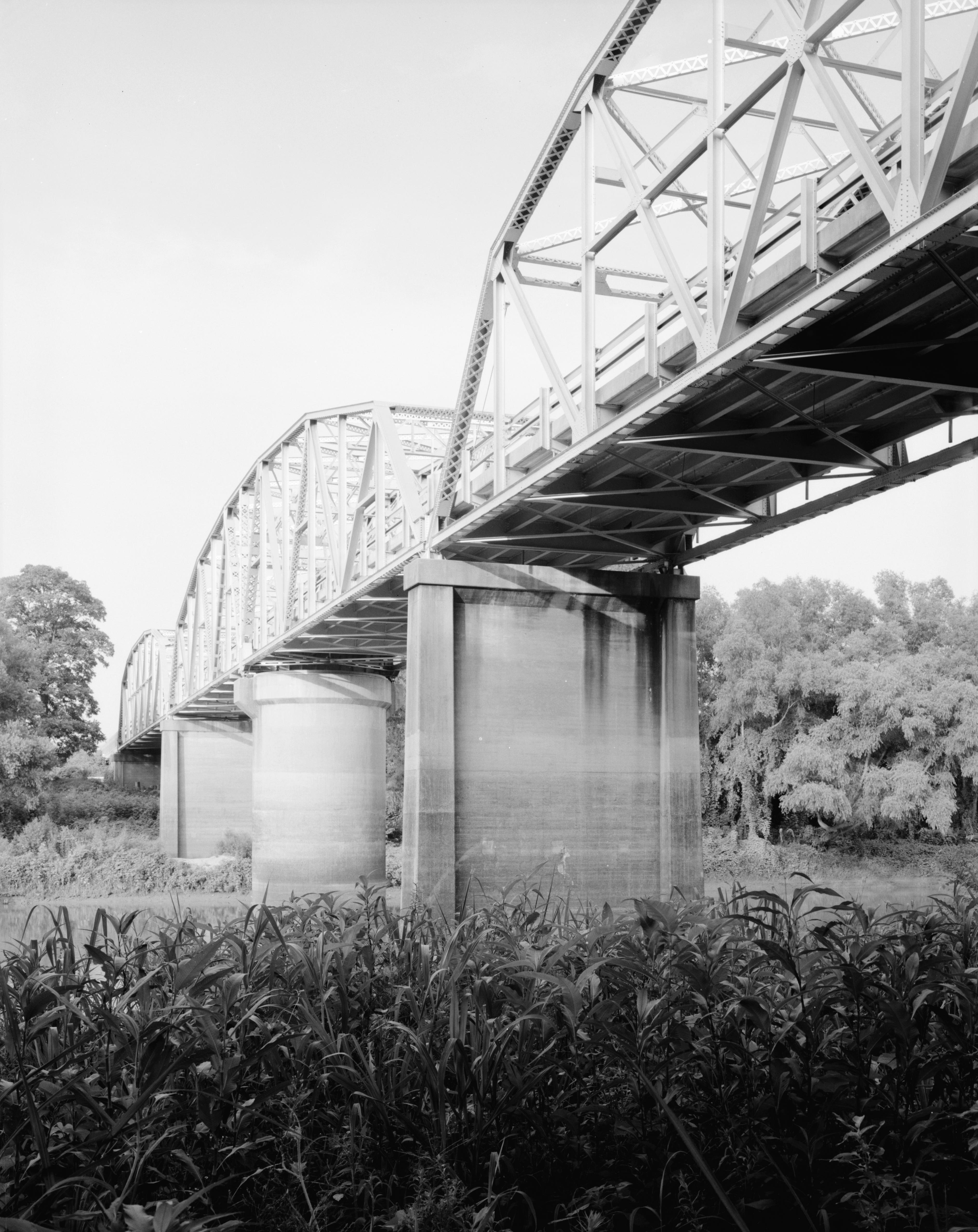
The St. Francis River Bridge near Madison is listed on the National Register of Historic Places

According to the United States Census Bureau, the city has a total area of 1.8 square miles (4.7 km^{2}), of which 1.7 square miles (4.4 km^{2}) is land and 0.1 square miles (0.26 km^{2}) (3.93%) is water.

== Demographics ==
Historical population
Census	Pop.	Note	%±
1880	145		—
1920	670		—
1930	634		−5.4%
1940	838		32.2%
1950	718		−14.3%
1960	750		4.5%
1970	984		31.2%
1980	1,238		25.8%
1990	1,263		2.0%
2000	987		−21.9%
2010	769		−22.1%
2020	759		−1.3%
2025 (est.)	713	▼	−6.1%
U.S. Decennial Census

=== 2020 Census ===
Madison city, Arkansas – Racial and ethnic composition Note: the US Census treats Hispanic/Latino as an ethnic category. This table excludes Latinos from the racial categories and assigns them to a separate category. Hispanics/Latinos may be of any race.
Race / Ethnicity (NH = Non-Hispanic)	Pop 2000	Pop 2010	Pop 2020	% 2000	% 2010	% 2020
White alone (NH)	95	94	164	9.63%	12.22%	21.61%
Black or African American alone (NH)	878	637	549	88.96%	82.83%	72.33%
Native American or Alaska Native alone (NH)	0	0	1	0.00%	0.00%	0.13%
Asian alone (NH)	0	1	0	0.00%	0.13%	0.00%
Native Hawaiian or Pacific Islander alone (NH)	0	0	0	0.00%	0.00%	0.00%
Other race alone (NH)	0	0	0	0.00%	0.00%	0.00%
Mixed race or Multiracial (NH)	6	11	19	0.61%	1.43%	2.50%
Hispanic or Latino (any race)	8	26	26	0.81%	3.38%	3.43%
Total	987	769	759	100.00%	100.00%	100.00%

As of the census of 2000, there were 987 people, 358 households, and 239 families residing in the city. The population density was 577.9 inhabitants per square mile (223.1/km^{2}). There were 409 housing units at an average density of 239.5 per square mile (92.5/km^{2}). The racial makeup of the city was 10.03% White, 88.96% Black or African American, 0.41% from other races, and 0.61% from two or more races. 0.81% of the population were Hispanic or Latino of any race.

There were 358 households, out of which 36.9% had children under the age of 18 living with them, 29.3% were married couples living together, 32.4% had a female householder with no husband present, and 33.2% were non-families. 30.2% of all households were made up of individuals, and 13.7% had someone living alone who was 65 years of age or older. The average household size was 2.76 and the average family size was 3.48.

In the city, the population was spread out, with 36.4% under the age of 18, 9.6% from 18 to 24, 22.1% from 25 to 44, 21.1% from 45 to 64, and 10.8% who were 65 years of age or older. The median age was 29 years. For every 100 females, there were 95.8 males. For every 100 females age 18 and over, there were 73.5 males.

The median income for a household in the city was $15,700, and the median income for a family was $20,682. Males had a median income of $21,875 versus $17,500 for females. The per capita income for the city was $9,733. About 40.4% of families and 41.9% of the population were below the poverty line, including 56.1% of those under age 18 and 50.4% of those age 65 or over.

== Education ==
Forrest City School District operates public schools serving the community. Forrest City High School is the local high school.

== Notable people ==
- Lew Buford Brown, lawyer, politician, newspaper publisher and poet
