= John H. McFadden House =

Historic house in Tennessee, United States

- U.S. National Register of Historic Places
- Location within Tennessee
- Location: 3712 Broadway, Bartlett, Tennessee
- Coordinates: 35°13′34″N 89°49′05″W
- Area: 10.6 acres (4.3 ha)
- Built: 1840; 1940
- Architect: Estes W. Mann
- Architectural style: Colonial Revival
- NRHP reference No.: 94000577
- Added to NRHP: June 10, 1994

The John H. McFadden House is a historic two-story house in Bartlett, Tennessee, United States.

== History ==
The house was built in 1840 for Dr. Samuel Bond, a settler and cotton farmer who served as a member of the Tennessee House of Representatives. It survived the American Civil War of 1861–1865, when it was used as a base by the Union Army. From 1870 to 1905, it belonged to Edmund Orgill.

The house was acquired by John H. McFadden, a cotton broker, in 1939. McFadden was an immigrant from England who served in World War I and became the president of the New York Cotton Exchange as well as an advisor to the National Cotton Council of America. After his death in 1955, the house was acquired by Eric Catmur, followed by John Green.

== Architectural significance ==
The house was redesigned in the Colonial Revival style by architect Estes W. Mann in 1940. It has been listed on the National Register of Historic Places since June 10, 1994.
