= Forrest City School District =

School district in Arkansas, United States

Address
- 625 Irving Street Forrest City, Arkansas, 72335; United States

District information
- Type: Public
- Grades: PreK–12
- NCES District ID: 0506270

Students and staff
- Students: 2,295
- Teachers: 148.56
- Staff: 164.45
- Student–teacher ratio: 15.45

Other information
- Website: mustang.grsc.k12.ar.us

Forrest City School District 7 (FCSD) is a school district headquartered in Forrest City, Arkansas.

In addition to Forrest City it serves other areas in central St. Francis County, including Caldwell, Colt, Madison, and Widener.

The board has seven members.

== Schools ==
Secondary

- Forrest City High School (9–12)
- Forrest City Junior High School (7–8)

Primary

- Sixth Grade Academy
- Stewart Elementary School (3–5)
- Central Elementary School (PreK-2nd Grade)

Pre-Kindergarten

- ABC Pre-School

Alternative

- Mustang Academy (9–12)
