= Forrest City High School =

Location
- 467 Victoria Street; Forrest City, Arkansas 72335; United States

Information
- Type: Public secondary
- Established: 1915 (111 years ago)
- School district: Forrest City School District
- NCES District ID: 0506270
- CEEB code: 040805
- NCES School ID: 050627000344
- Dean: Donnie Willis
- Principal: Osceola "Sonny" Hicks
- Faculty: 63.23 (on FTE basis)
- Grades: 9–12
- Student to teacher ratio: 8.98
- Campus type: Closed
- Colors: Royal blue and white
- Athletics conference: 4A Region 2 (2024-2025)
- Mascot: Mustang
- Team name: Forrest City Mustangs
- Federal funding: Title I
- Website: www.fcmustangs.net/fchs

Forrest City High School is a comprehensive public high school in Forrest City, Arkansas, United States. It is the sole high school administered by the Forrest City School District and its main feeder school is Forrest City Junior High School.

In addition to Forrest City it serves other areas in central St. Francis County, including Caldwell, Colt, Madison, and Widener.

== History ==
Serving students in grades nine through twelve since 1892, an earlier building on Rosser Street built in 1915, known as Old Central, is listed on the National Register of Historic Places since 1992.

- Forrest City High School
- U.S. National Register of Historic Places
- Location within Arkansas Location within the United States
- Nearest city: Forrest City, Arkansas
- Coordinates: 35°00′59″N 90°47′21″W
- Area: less than one acre
- Built: 1915
- Architect: W.C. Lester
- Architectural style: Classical Revival
- NRHP reference No.: 92001341
- Added to NRHP: October 8, 1992

During racial segregation, Black students attended "Colored High School" where Wallace Leon Purifoy served as principal for 23 years. He later founded the fraternal group the Imperial Council of Jugamos, headquartered in Forrest City.

== Academics ==
Forrest City High School is accredited as a 1924 charter member of AdvancED (formerly North Central Association). The assumed course of study follows the Smart Core curriculum established by the Arkansas Department of Education (ADE).

Students engage in regular and Advanced Placement (AP) coursework and exams. FCHS is a member of the Arkansas Advanced Initiative for Math and Science (AAIMS) designed to improve scores on AP exams.

== Extracurricular activities ==
The Forrest City High School mascot is the Mustang horse with the school colors as Royal blue and white. The Forrest City Mustangs compete in the 4A Region 2 administered by the Arkansas Activities Association (AAA).

The Mustangs have won several state championships including:

- Golf: The boys golf team are 2-time state golf champions (1969, 1973).
- Basketball: The Mustangs boys basketball team won its first state championship in 2014 and another in 2016.
- Track and field: The boys track teams are 6-time state track and field champions; winning three consecutive state titles in 1975, 1976 and 1977, followed by two consecutive track banners in 2006 and 2007 again in 2016.

== Notable alumni ==
- Don Kessinger (1960) - 6x Major League Baseball All-Star player; manager of Chicago White Sox in 1979; high school All-American and NFHS National High School Hall of Fame inductee
- Stan Winfrey (1971) - former professional football player
- Jimmy Rogers (1973) - former professional football player
- Jason Jones (2003) - former professional football player
- Barrett Astin (2009) - former professional baseball player
- Cara McCollum (2010) - Miss New Jersey 2013; Miss America Contestant in 2014; news anchor
- Leo Fong (c.1946) - Actor and martial artist
