= New Shady Grove, Arkansas =

- Unincorporated community
- Location within Arkansas Location within the United States
- Coordinates: 35°07′55″N 90°26′41″W
- Country: United States
- State: Arkansas
- County: St. Francis
- Elevation: 207 ft (63 m)
- Time zone: UTC-6 (Central (CST))
  - Summer (DST): UTC-5 (CDT)
- Area code: 870
- GNIS feature ID: 82965

New Shady Grove is an unincorporated community in St. Francis County, Arkansas, United States. New Shady Grove is located on U.S. Route 70, 3.3 miles (5.3 km) southwest of Jennette.
