= Zent, Arkansas =

- Unincorporated community
- Location within Arkansas Location within the United States
- Coordinates: 34°59′01″N 91°09′47″W
- Country: United States
- State: Arkansas
- County: Monroe
- Elevation: 197 ft (60 m)
- Time zone: UTC-6 (Central (CST))
  - Summer (DST): UTC-5 (CDT)
- Area code: 870
- GNIS feature ID: 58930

Zent is an unincorporated community in Monroe County, Arkansas, United States. Zent is located on U.S. Route 49, 2.4 miles (3.9 km) north-northeast of Fargo.
