= Caldwell, Arkansas =

- Town
- Location of Caldwell in St. Francis County, Arkansas.
- Coordinates: 35°04′44″N 90°48′48″W
- Country: United States
- State: Arkansas
- County: St. Francis

Area
  - Town: 3.20 sq mi (8.30 km^{2})
  - Land: 3.19 sq mi (8.25 km^{2})
  - Water: 0.019 sq mi (0.05 km^{2})
- Elevation: 240 ft (73 m)

Population (2020)
  - Town: 451
  - Estimate (2025): 419 ▼
  - Density: 141.5/sq mi (54.65/km^{2})
  - Metro: 72
- Time zone: UTC-6 (Central (CST))
  - Summer (DST): UTC-5 (CDT)
- FIPS code: 05-10450
- GNIS feature ID: 2405359

Caldwell is a town in St. Francis County, Arkansas, United States. The population was 451 at the 2020 census.

== Geography ==
According to the United States Census Bureau, the town has a total area of 7.8 km^{2} (3.0 sq mi), of which 7.8 km^{2} (3.0 sq mi) is land and 0.1 km^{2} (0.039 sq mi) (0.66%) is water.

== Demographics ==
Historical population
| Census | Pop. | Note | %± |
|---|---|---|---|
| 1970 | 292 | | — |
| 1980 | 283 | | −3.1% |
| 1990 | 334 | | 18.0% |
| 2000 | 465 | | 39.2% |
| 2010 | 555 | | 19.4% |
| 2020 | 451 | | −18.7% |
| 2025 (est.) | 419 | ▼ | −7.1% |
U.S. Decennial Census

As of the census of 2000, there were 465 people, 174 households, and 140 families residing in the town. The population density was 59.6 people/km^{2} (154 people/mi^{2}). There were 190 housing units at an average density of 24.4 units/km^{2} (63 units/mi^{2}). The racial makeup of the town was 82.80% White, 15.05% Black or African American, 0.43% Native American, 1.51% Asian, and 0.22% from two or more races. 0.65% of the population were Hispanic or Latino of any race.

There were 174 households, out of which 35.6% had children under the age of 18 living with them, 70.7% were married couples living together, 8.6% had a female householder with no husband present, and 19.0% were non-families. 15.5% of all households were made up of individuals, and 6.9% had someone living alone who was 65 years of age or older. The average household size was 2.67 and the average family size was 2.99.

In the town, the population was spread out, with 25.4% under the age of 18, 8.6% from 18 to 24, 28.0% from 25 to 44, 24.7% from 45 to 64, and 13.3% who were 65 years of age or older. The median age was 38 years. For every 100 females, there were 97.9 males. For every 100 females age 18 and over, there were 92.8 males.

The median income for a household in the town was $38,594, and the median income for a family was $46,250. Males had a median income of $31,806 versus $21,500 for females. The per capita income for the town was $16,889. About 9.9% of families and 15.9% of the population were below the poverty line, including 26.4% of those under age 18 and 16.3% of those age 65 or over.

== Education ==
Forrest City School District operates public schools serving the community. Forrest City High School is the local high school.
