= Forrest City, Arkansas =

City in the United States

- City
- Motto(s): One Forrest City, moving forward, one step at a time
- Location of Forrest City in St. Francis County, Arkansas
- Coordinates: 35°00′20″N 90°47′19″W
- Country: United States
- State: Arkansas
- County: St. Francis

Area
  - Total: 20.31 sq mi (52.60 km^{2})
  - Land: 20.24 sq mi (52.43 km^{2})
  - Water: 0.066 sq mi (0.17 km^{2})
- Elevation: 249 ft (76 m)

Population (2020)
  - Total: 13,015
  - Estimate (2025): 12,308 ▼
  - Density: 642.9/sq mi (248.22/km^{2})
- Time zone: UTC-6 (Central (CST))
  - Summer (DST): UTC-5 (CDT)
- ZIP Code: 72335
- FIPS code: 05-24430
- GNIS feature ID: 2403637
- Website: www.cityofforrestcityar.com

Forrest City is a city in and the county seat of St. Francis County, Arkansas, United States. It was named for General Nathan Bedford Forrest, a notable Confederate war hero who later became the first Grand Wizard of the Ku Klux Klan. Shortly after the end of the Civil War, he had a construction crew camped here, who were completing a railroad between Memphis and Little Rock. As of the 2020 census, Forrest City had a population of 13,015. The city identifies as the "Jewel of the Delta".

== History ==
=== 19th century ===
On October 13, 1827, St. Francis County, located in the east central part of Arkansas, was officially organized by the Arkansas Territorial Legislature in Little Rock.

Nathan Bedford Forrest, a Confederate General and later the first Grand Wizard of the Ku Klux Klan, became interested in the area around Crowley's Ridge during the American Civil War. In 1866, General Forrest and C. C. McCreanor contracted to finish the Memphis & Little Rock Railroad from Madison located on the St. Francis River to DeValls Bluff on the west bank of the White River. The route traversed the challenging Crowley's Ridge and L'Anguille River bottoms. In 1868, train service through Forrest City was established.

Forrest later built a commissary on Front Street. Colonel V.B. Izard began the task of designing the town at the same time. Most residents were calling the area "Forrest's Town," which was later named Forrest City and was incorporated on May 11, 1870.

The county seat was initially located in the now defunct town of Franklin until 1840, when it was moved to Madison. In 1855 it was moved to Mount Vernon where the court house burned in 1856 destroying county records. This prompted a move back to Madison. The county seat was moved to Forrest City in 1874, where the courthouse was assigned to a wooden structure. When it burned shortly thereafter, county records were again destroyed.

In 1889, the city was the site of a white race riot that resulted in their expulsion of African American leaders.

=== 20th century ===
The Imperial Council of Jugamos, a fraternal organization of African Americans founded in 1910 by Wallace Leon Purifoy had its headquarters in Forrest City. The Forrest City Herald printed its constitution in 1916. The New Castle Herald noted the group and its officers in 1919.

In 1940, Forrest City was a stop for the Choctaw Rocket, a passenger train operated by the Chicago, Rock Island and Pacific Railroad. Service was discontinued in 1964. Evidence that giant mastodons roamed the slope was revealed in 1949 when workmen excavating for sewer improvements found bones of the massive beasts within the city limits.

In 1988, Forrest City High School held its first integrated prom. After school integration was ordered in the mid-1960s, Forrest City eliminated school-sponsored dances and social activities. For 23 years, social clubs and individual families had organized a racially segregated prom.

=== 21st century ===
In 2018, the city elected Cedric Williams as mayor; Williams is the third African American mayor in the city's history.

== Geography ==
According to the U.S. Census Bureau, the city has a total area of 16.3 square miles (42 km^{2}), 16.2 square miles (42 km^{2}) of which is land and 0.1 square miles (0.26 km^{2}) (0.37%) of which is water.

Forrest City is located on Crowley's Ridge, a geological phenomenon that rises above the flat Mississippi Delta terrain that surrounds it. This north-south running highland is some three miles wide and 300 feet above sea level. Several species of trees not indigenous to Arkansas are found here, including beech, butternut, sugar maple, and cucumber trees.

== Demographics ==
Historical population
| Census | Pop. | Note | %± |
|---|---|---|---|
| 1880 | 903 | | — |
| 1890 | 1,021 | | 13.1% |
| 1900 | 1,361 | | 33.3% |
| 1910 | 2,484 | | 82.5% |
| 1920 | 3,377 | | 36.0% |
| 1930 | 4,594 | | 36.0% |
| 1940 | 5,699 | | 24.1% |
| 1950 | 7,607 | | 33.5% |
| 1960 | 10,544 | | 38.6% |
| 1970 | 12,521 | | 18.8% |
| 1980 | 13,803 | | 10.2% |
| 1990 | 13,364 | | −3.2% |
| 2000 | 14,774 | | 10.6% |
| 2010 | 15,371 | | 4.0% |
| 2020 | 13,015 | | −15.3% |
| 2025 (est.) | 12,308 | ▼ | −5.4% |
U.S. Decennial Census

=== 2020 census ===
As of the 2020 census, Forrest City had a population of 13,015. The median age was 39.9 years. 20.7% of residents were under the age of 18 and 13.2% of residents were 65 years of age or older. For every 100 females there were 138.1 males, and for every 100 females age 18 and over there were 152.8 males age 18 and over.

62.8% of residents lived in urban areas, while 37.2% lived in rural areas.

There were 4,016 households and 2,655 families in Forrest City, of which 32.4% had children under the age of 18 living in them. Of all households, 27.2% were married-couple households, 18.5% were households with a male householder and no spouse or partner present, and 48.6% were households with a female householder and no spouse or partner present. About 33.9% of all households were made up of individuals and 12.7% had someone living alone who was 65 years of age or older.

There were 4,586 housing units, of which 12.4% were vacant. The homeowner vacancy rate was 2.2% and the rental vacancy rate was 6.5%.

Racial composition as of the 2020 census
| Race | Number | Percent |
|---|---|---|
| White | 3,338 | 25.6% |
| Black or African American | 9,228 | 70.9% |
| American Indian and Alaska Native | 42 | 0.3% |
| Asian | 81 | 0.6% |
| Native Hawaiian and Other Pacific Islander | 2 | 0.0% |
| Some other race | 67 | 0.5% |
| Two or more races | 257 | 2.0% |
| Hispanic or Latino (of any race) | 446 | 3.4% |

== Government and infrastructure ==
The Federal Bureau of Prisons Federal Correctional Complex, Forrest City is in Forrest City.

The United States Postal Service operates the Forrest City Post Office.

Woodruff Electric Cooperative, a non-profit rural electric utility cooperative, is headquartered in Forrest City.

== Local landmarks ==
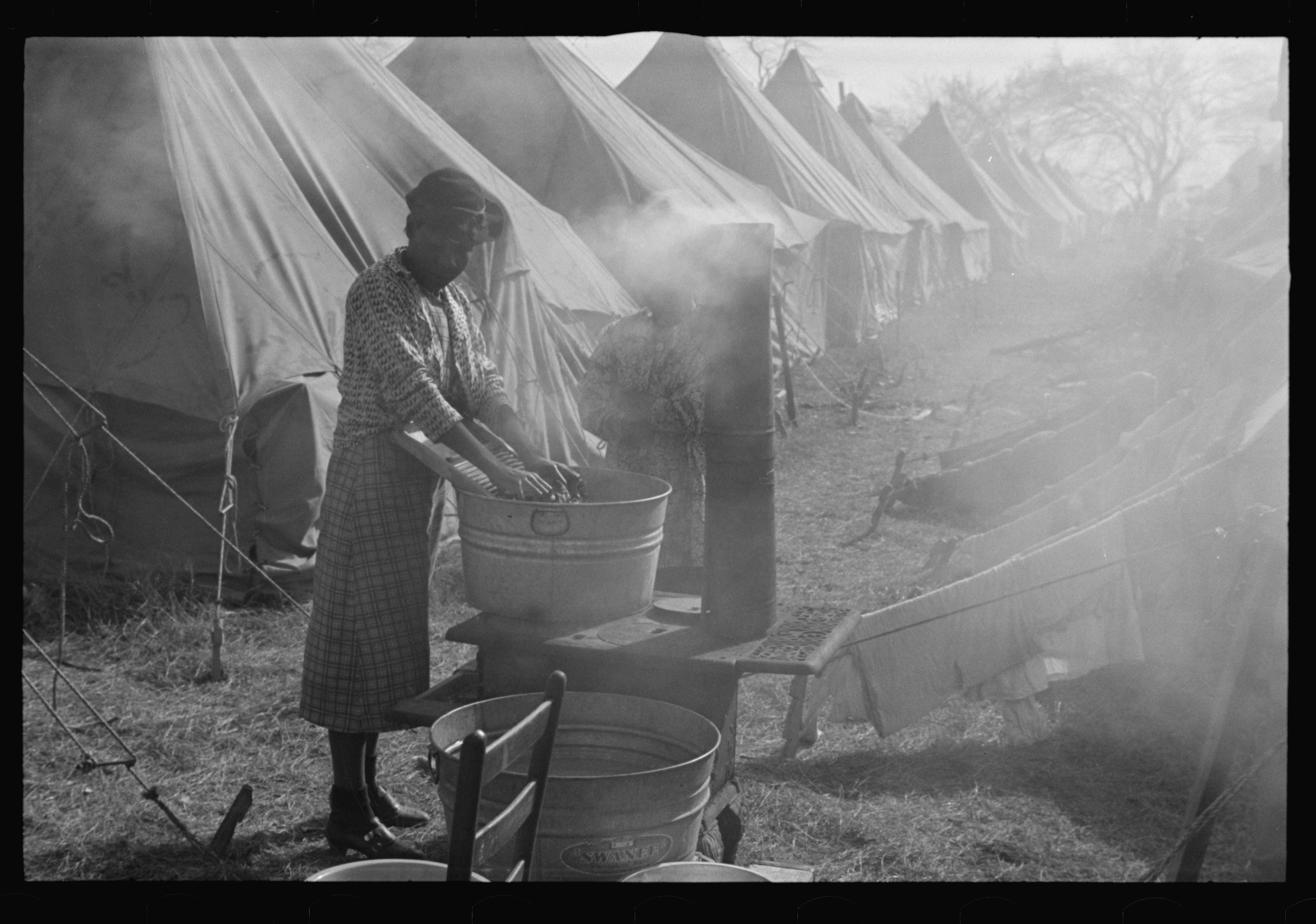
A 1938 photo of a woman in Forrest City following flooding in the city

The Forrest City Chamber of Commerce is located in the 100-year-old Becker House. This house has served a variety of functions since being sold by the Becker family. It was an antique store and later a home furnishings boutique before being occupied by the Chamber.

Forrest City had five sites listed on the National Register of Historic Places including:

- Campbell House
- First United Methodist
- Forrest City High School (aka, "Old Central")
- Mann House
- Stuart Springs

== Education ==
Forrest City School District operates public schools, including Forrest City High School.

Circa 2014 KIPP Delta established the grade 5-8 KIPP Forrest City College Preparatory School in Forrest City, which occupied several temporary buildings and a portion of a Catholic church which had a lease agreement with KIPP. In 2018 KIPP Delta asked the State of Arkansas for permission to close KIPP Forrest City and send students to the Helena-West Helena facility.

== Notable people ==
- Barrett Astin, former professional baseball player, Cincinnati Reds
- Little Buddy Doyle, blues guitarist, singer and songwriter
- Lewis P. Featherstone, former U.S. Representative
- Al Green, singer and minister
- Willie Hale, rhythm and blues guitarist, singer and songwriter
- John W. Henry, principal owner, Boston Red Sox
- Chris Hicky, music video director
- Mark W. Izard, 3rd Governor of the Nebraska Territory
- Jason Jones, professional football player
- Don Kessinger, born in Forrest City, professional baseball player and manager.
- Albert King, blues artist
- Henry Loeb, mayor of Memphis, Tennessee
- Cara McCollum, 2013 Miss New Jersey
- Gilbert Morris, award-winning Christian author
- King Perry, jazz saxophonist, clarinetist, arranger, and bandleader
- Jimmy Rogers, football player
- Cal Slayton, comic book artist
- Vernon Sykes, member of Ohio House of Representatives
- John Thompson, college football player and coach
- Dwight Tosh, Republican member of the Arkansas House of Representatives
- Winston P. Wilson, U.S. Air Force Major General and Chief of the National Guard Bureau
- Dennis Winston, professional football player
- G. Wood, one of four actors to appear in both the 1970 film M*A*S*H and the television series M*A*S*H.
- Marshall Wright, former member of the Arkansas House of Representatives
- AKIA, R&B singer

== See also ==
- Forrest City Municipal Airport
- Forrest City School District
