= Old South Restaurant =

- Formerly listed on the U.S. National Register of Historic Places
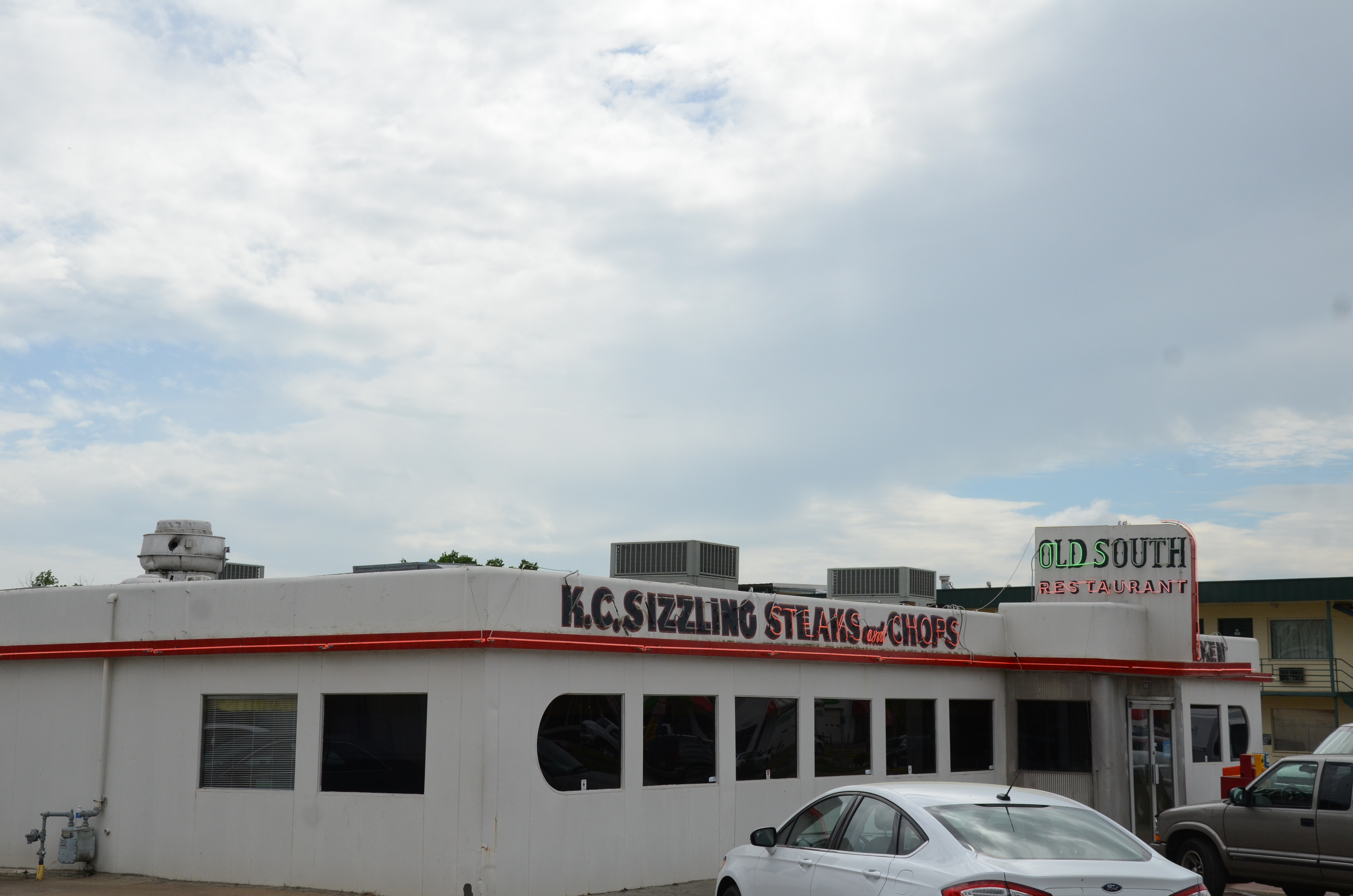

- Location within Arkansas Location within the United States
- Location: 1330 E. Main St., Russellville, Arkansas
- Coordinates: 35°16′41″N 93°7′1″W
- Area: less than one acre
- Built: 1947
- Built by: Stell, William E.; et.al.
- Architectural style: Moderne
- MPS: Arkansas Highway History and Architecture MPS
- NRHP reference No.: 99001064

Significant dates
- Added to NRHP: September 3, 1999
- Removed from NRHP: January 2, 2024

The Old South Restaurant was a historic diner and local restaurant landmark at 1330 East Main Street in Russellville, Arkansas. It was a modular single-story structure, with streamlined Art Moderne styling consisting of exterior porcelain-coated aluminum paneling, bands of fixed windows, and a protruding aluminum entrance, above which a neon-lighted sign rose. The diner was built in 1947 out of manufactured parts produced by the National Glass and Manufacturing Company of Fort Smith, Arkansas. Construction time was six days.

The building was listed on the National Register of Historic Places in 1999, and was delisted in 2024.

In the early hours of June 6, 2023, smoke was reported coming from the restaurant. Fire crews from Russellville Fire Department battled the blaze for several hours. While the exterior walls were still standing, the building was a total loss. The restaurant was reopened at 105 E Harrell Dr, Russellville, AR 72802, in a building that was formerly occupied by Dixie cafe.

== See also ==
- National Register of Historic Places listings in Pope County, Arkansas
