= Henry R. Koen Forest Service Building =

- Koen, Henry R., Forest Service Building
- U.S. National Register of Historic Places
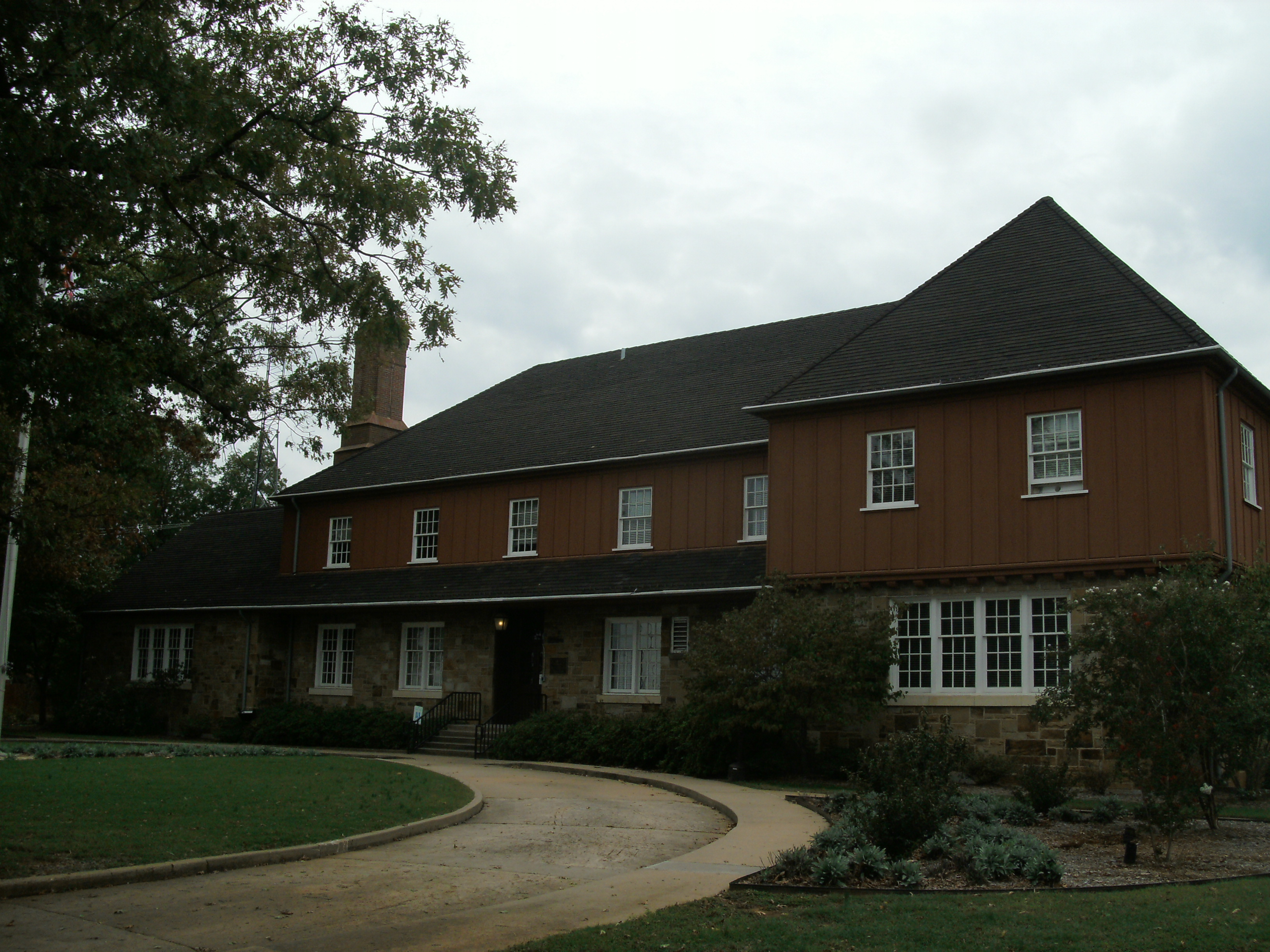

- Location within Arkansas Location within the United States
- Location: 605 W. Main St., Russelville, Arkansas
- Coordinates: 35°16′43″N 93°8′20″W
- Area: less than one acre
- Built: 1939
- Built by: Civilian Conservation Corps
- Architectural style: Rustic
- NRHP reference No.: 89001628
- Added to NRHP: December 11, 1989

The Henry R. Koen Forest Service Building is a historic federal government office building at 605 West Main Street in Russellville, Arkansas. It is a two-story stone and frame structure, built in 1939 by crews of the Civilian Conservation Corps. The building is a distinctive urban adaptation of the rustic style for which the CCC became well known. Originally built to house both the main offices of the Ozark-St. Francis National Forest and local CCC administrators, it is now used exclusively by the former.

Previously known as the Ozark National Forest Headquarters Building, a public law designated the structure as the Henry R. Koen Forest Service Building on October 17, 1978, officially honoring Koen, who had served in the Forest Service since 1913, was Ozark National Forest supervisor from 1922 through 1939 and who reportedly had a hand in the design of the headquarters building. Senator Dale Bumpers helped secure the legislation necessary to name a government building in honor of an individual.

The building was listed on the National Register of Historic Places in 1989.

== See also ==
- National Register of Historic Places listings in Pope County, Arkansas
