= W.J. White House =

Historic house in Arkansas, United States

- W. J. White House
- U.S. National Register of Historic Places
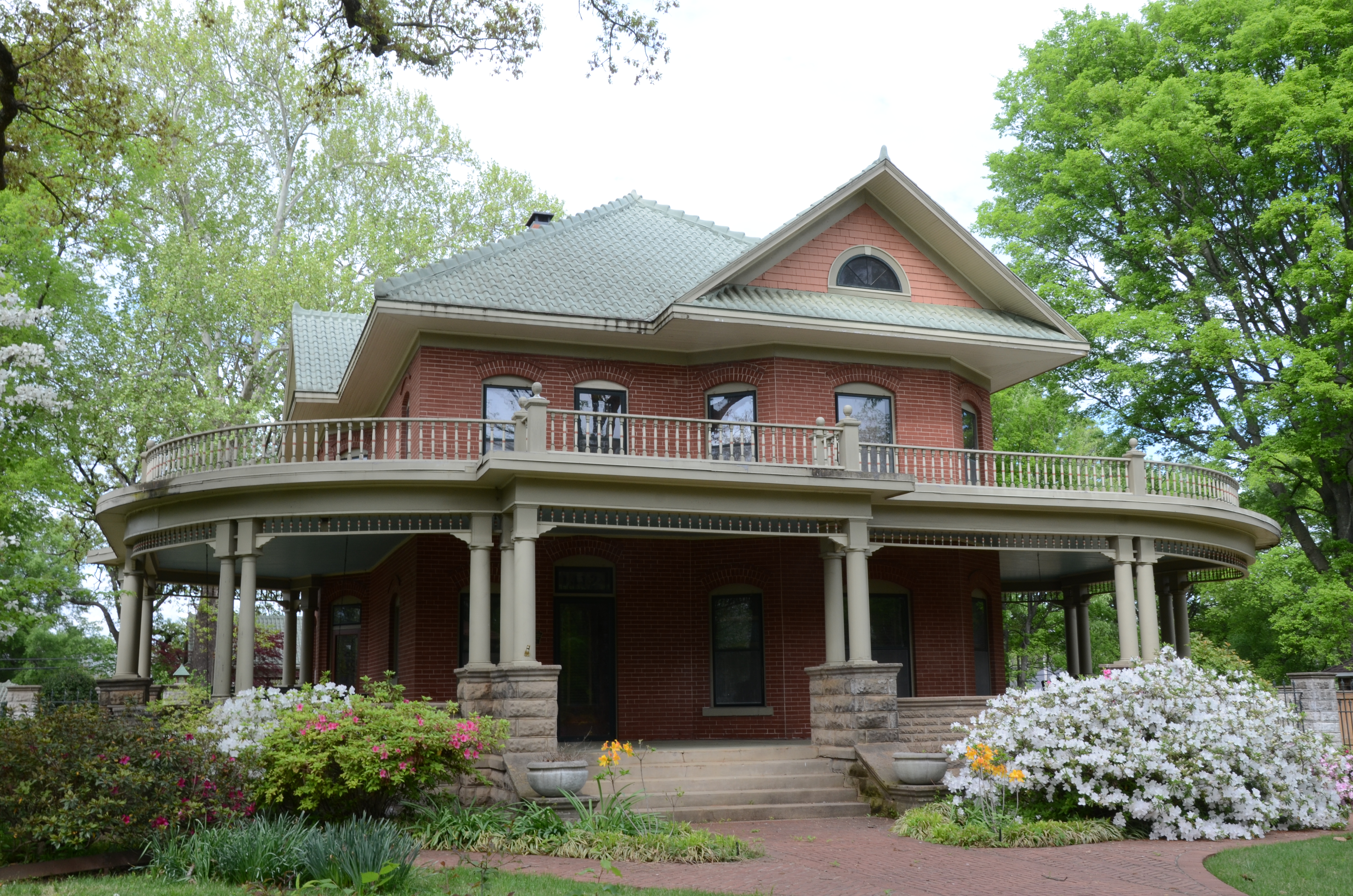

- Location within Arkansas Location within the United States
- Location: 1412 W. Main St., Russellville, Arkansas
- Coordinates: 35°16′57″N 93°8′54″W
- Area: less than one acre
- Built: 1908
- Architect: O.S. Nelson
- Architectural style: Late Victorian, Bungalow/craftsman
- NRHP reference No.: 78000617
- Added to NRHP: December 13, 1978

The W.J. White House is a historic house at 1412 West Main Street in Russellville, Arkansas. It is a 2 1/2-story brick structure, covered by a pressed tin roof that resembles tile. A single-story porch curves gracefully across the front and around to both sides, supported by clustered round columns, with spindlework valances between them, and a stone balustrade below. Built in 1908, it is a distinctive and eclectic blend of Queen Anne and Craftsman styling.

The house was listed on the National Register of Historic Places in 1978.

== See also ==
- National Register of Historic Places listings in Pope County, Arkansas
