= Norristown Cemetery =

Historic cemetery in Arkansas, United States

- U.S. National Register of Historic Places
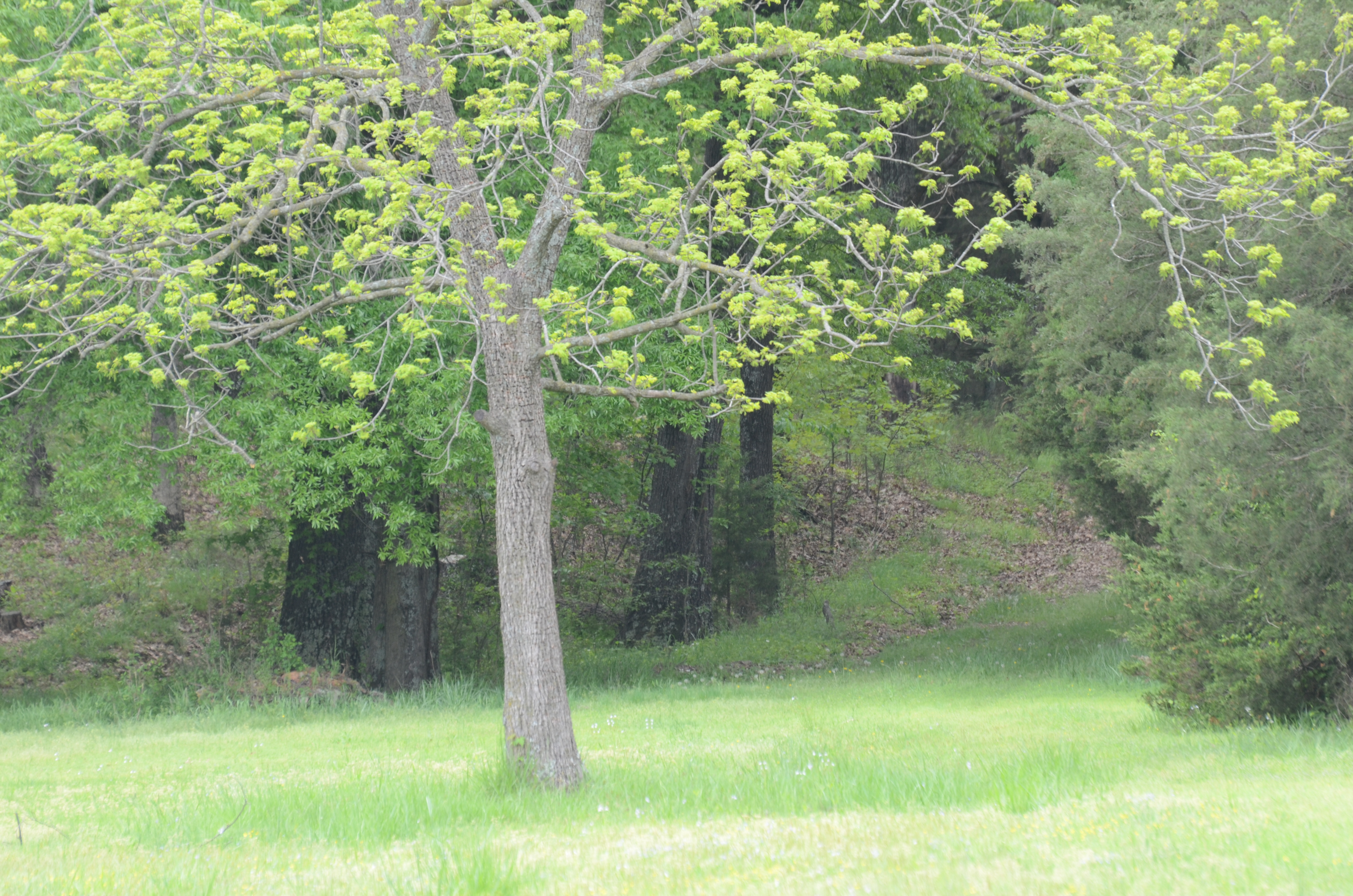

- Location within Arkansas Location within the United States
- Location: Off Arkansas Highway 7 (Lock and Dam Rd.), near Russellville, Arkansas
- Coordinates: 35°14′35″N 93°9′1″W
- Area: less than one acre
- Built: 1853
- NRHP reference No.: 94001415
- Added to NRHP: April 14, 1995

The Norristown Cemetery is a historic cemetery off Lock and Dam Road, on the south side of Russellville, Arkansas. It is a small community cemetery, with thirty marked grave sites, the oldest of which is dated 1853 and the newest 1934. It is the only surviving remnant of the community of Norristown, which was an early settlement and the first county seat of Pope County.

The cemetery was listed on the National Register of Historic Places in 1995.

== See also ==
- National Register of Historic Places listings in Pope County, Arkansas
