= Russellville Masonic Temple =

- U.S. National Register of Historic Places
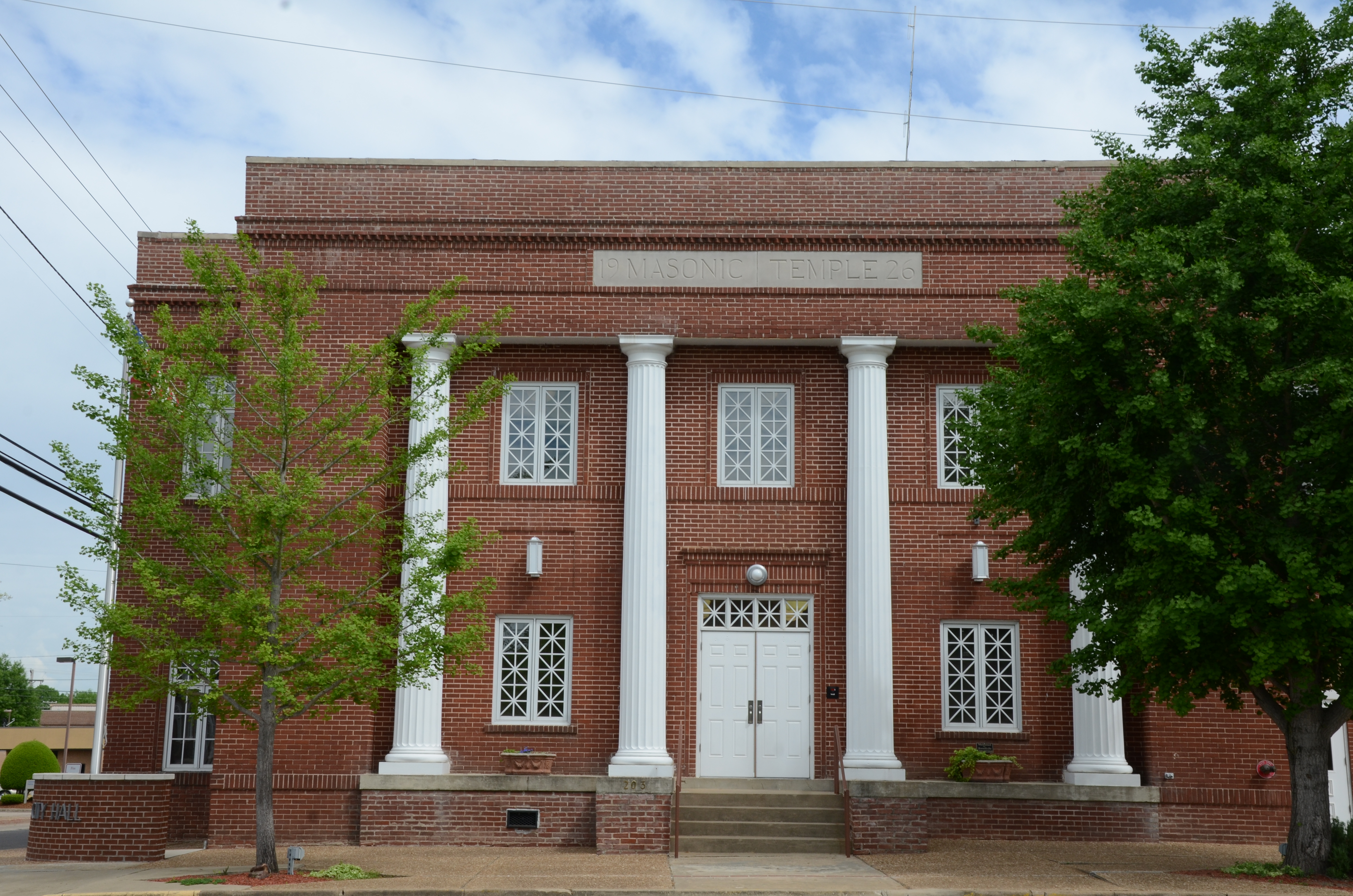

- Location within Arkansas Location within the United States
- Location: 205 S. Commerce, Russellville, Arkansas
- Coordinates: 35°16′39″N 93°8′7″W
- Area: 0.9 acres (0.36 ha)
- Built: 1926
- Architect: Harelson and Nelson; Milner, T.P. Construction Co.
- Architectural style: Classical Revival
- NRHP reference No.: 05000499
- Added to NRHP: June 1, 2005

The Russellville Masonic Temple, also known as Russellville City Hall, is a clubhouse and municipal building at 205 South Commerce Street in Russellville, Arkansas. Built in 1926, it is a Classical Revival building. It was listed on the National Register of Historic Places in 2005.

The edifice was constructed as a Masonic temple, with the first floor rented to the city for use as the City Hall. In 1943, the city bought the building, paid off the mortgage, and rented the second floor to the Masons. As of 2001, the Masons were preparing to vacate the second floor.

== See also ==
- National Register of Historic Places listings in Pope County, Arkansas
