= Threlkeld House =

Historic house in Arkansas, United States

- U.S. National Register of Historic Places
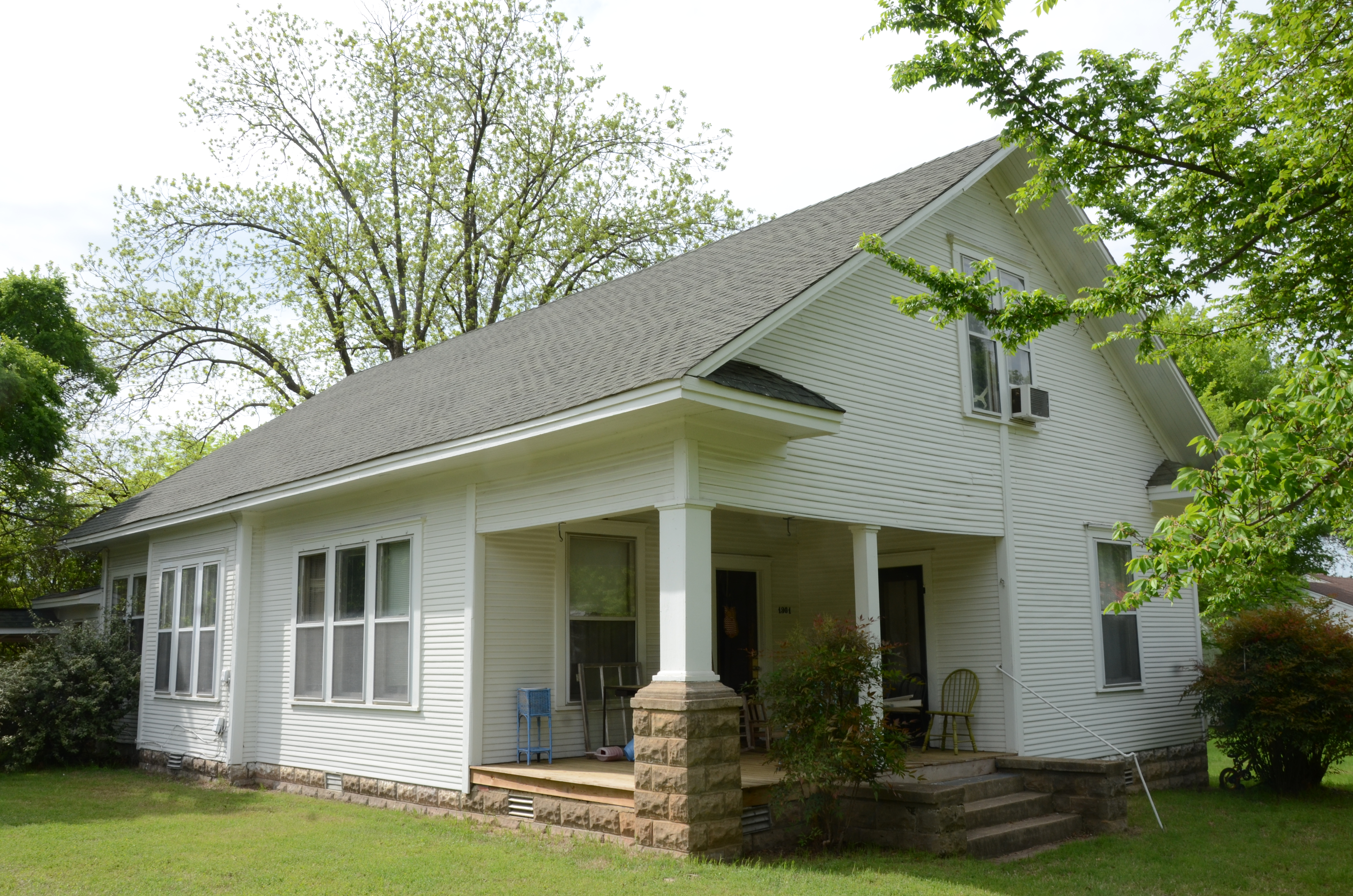

- Location within Arkansas Location within the United States
- Location: 1301 N. Boston Ave., Russellville, Arkansas
- Coordinates: 35°17′27″N 93°7′56″W
- Area: less than one acre
- Built: 1914
- Architect: W.R. Shewmake
- Architectural style: Plain traditional
- NRHP reference No.: 00000610
- Added to NRHP: June 2, 2000

The Threlkeld House is a historic house at 1301 North Boston Avenue in Russellville, Arkansas. It is a 1 1/2-story wood-frame structure, with a gable roof and weatherboard siding. At one corner, a recessed porch is supported by square posts, the corner one mounted on a pier of rusticated concrete blocks. The house was built in 1914, and is unusual as an early vernacular ("Plain Traditional") house in a neighborhood of later houses featuring other styles. The house was owned until 1995 by members of the Threlkeld family.

The house was listed on the National Register of Historic Places in 2000.

== See also ==
- National Register of Historic Places listings in Pope County, Arkansas
