= William H. Norwood House =

Historic house in Arkansas, United States

- U.S. National Register of Historic Places
- Location within Arkansas Location within the United States
- Location: 1602 West Main St., Russellville, Arkansas
- Coordinates: 35°16′56″N 93°8′54″W
- Area: less than one acre
- Built: 1917
- Built by: Olaf S. Nelson
- Architect: W.L. Scarlett
- Architectural style: Craftsman; Prairie School
- NRHP reference No.: 100003988
- Added to NRHP: May 29, 2019

The William H. Norwood House is a historic house at 1602 West Main Street in Russellville, Arkansas. It is a two-story frame structure, finished in red brick veneer and covered by a hip roof. The main block of the building is extending to the side and rear by single-story extensions, one of which includes an enclosed rear porch. The house was built in 1917 for William H. Norwood, a local merchant. It is a rare surviving example in the community of a large-scale residence with high quality Craftsman and Prairie School features. The area where it stands was once predominantly residential, but has in recent years become more commercial. The house is now occupied by professional offices.

The house was listed on the National Register of Historic Places in 2019.

== See also ==
- National Register of Historic Places listings in Pope County, Arkansas
