= John White House =

John White House may refer to:

- John W. White House, Russellville, Arkansas, listed on the National Register of Historic Places in Pope County, Arkansas
- John White House (Lawrenceville, New Jersey), listed on the National Register of Historic Places in Mercer County, New Jersey
- John White House (Chartiers Township, Pennsylvania), listed on the National Register of Historic Places in Washington County, Pennsylvania
- John M. White House, Fort Mill, South Carolina, listed on the National Register of Historic Places in York County, South Carolina
