= Wilson House (Russellville, Arkansas) =

Historic house in Arkansas, United States

- U.S. National Register of Historic Places
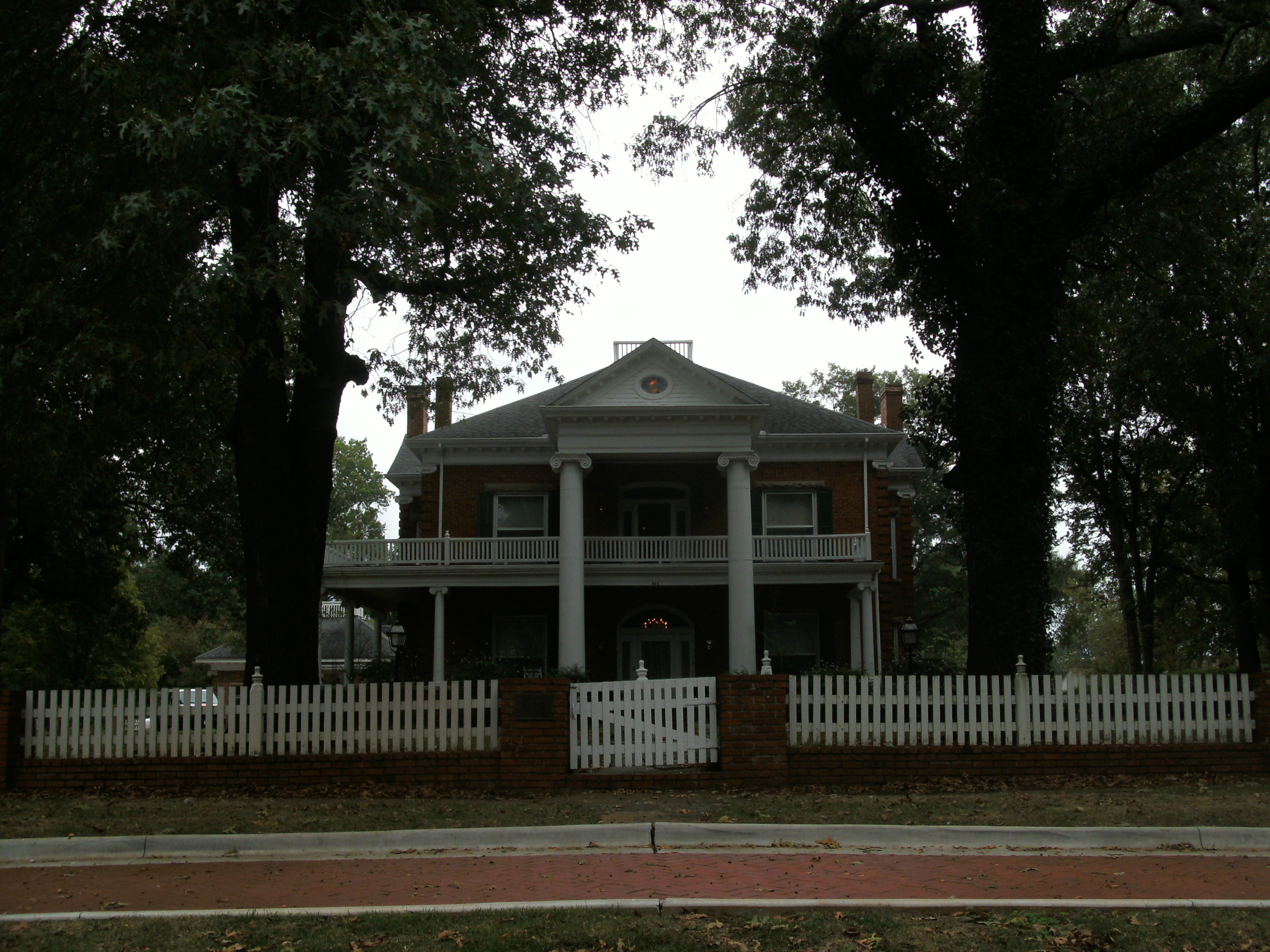

- Location within Arkansas Location within the United States
- Location: 214 E. 5th St., Russellville, Arkansas
- Coordinates: 35°16′25″N 93°7′51″W
- Area: less than one acre
- Built: 1903
- NRHP reference No.: 78000618
- Added to NRHP: March 29, 1978

The Wilson House is a historic house at 214 East 5th Street in Russellville, Arkansas. It is a two-story brick building with a hip roof, and tall two-story projecting gabled entry pavilion, supported by massive Doric columns. A two-story porch, open on the second level, wraps across the front and around the left side. Built in 1903 by a local judge, it was from an early date a local tourist attraction for its distinctive appearance.

The house was listed on the National Register of Historic Places in 1978.

== See also ==
- National Register of Historic Places listings in Pope County, Arkansas
