= Fair View School =

- U.S. National Register of Historic Places
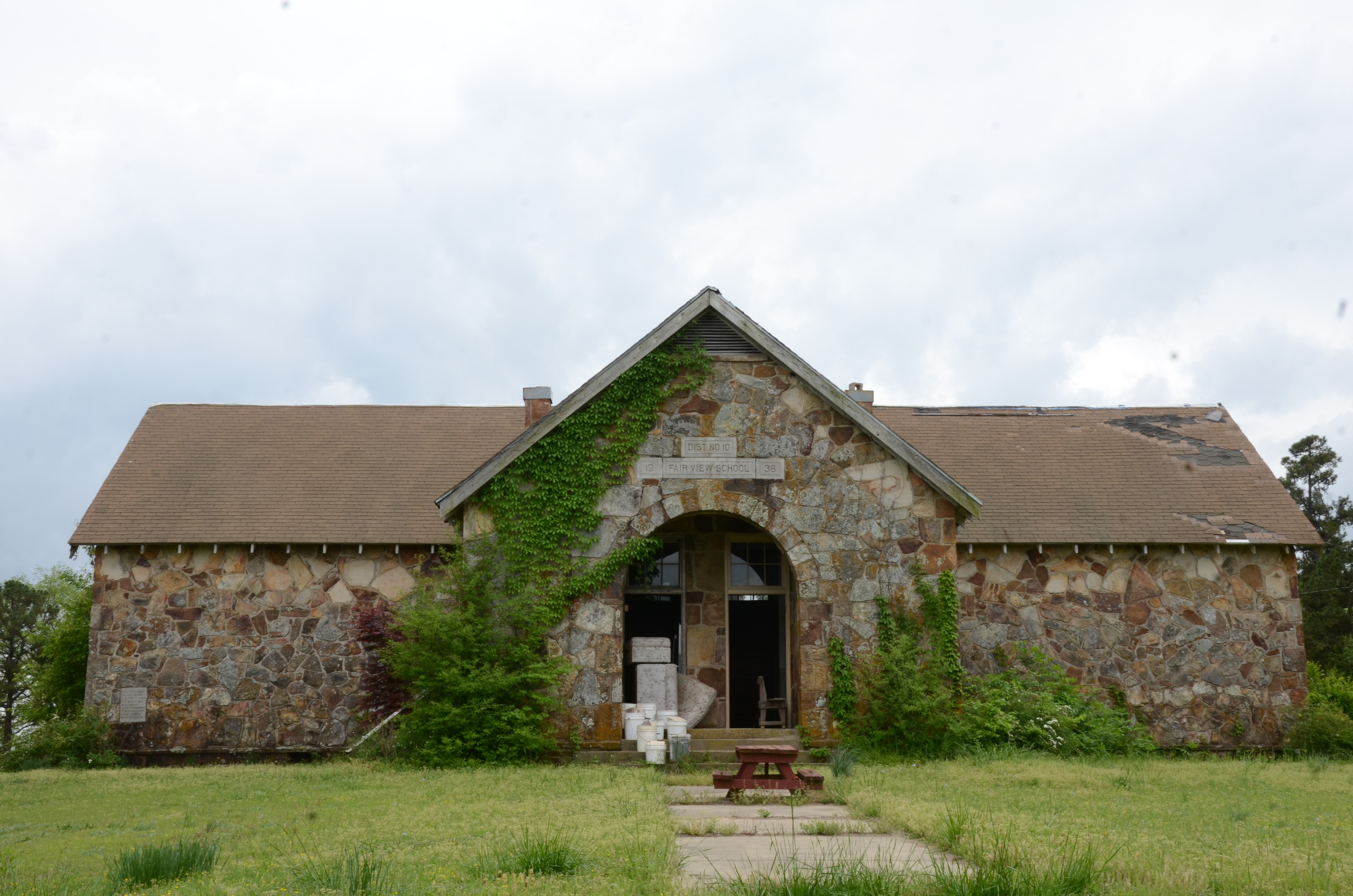

- Location within Arkansas Location within the United States
- Location: 2367 Mill Creek Rd., Russellville, Arkansas
- Coordinates: 35°21′13″N 93°12′41″W
- Area: 10.5 acres (4.2 ha)
- Built: 1938
- Built by: Leon Reed
- Architect: K.W. Brown
- Architectural style: Bungalow/Craftsman
- MPS: Public Schools in the Ozarks MPS
- NRHP reference No.: 00000030
- Added to NRHP: February 4, 2000

The Fair View School is a historic school building at 2367 Mill Creek Road in Pope County, Arkansas, 4.5 miles northwest of Russellville, Arkansas. It is a single-story T-shaped fieldstone structure, with a gabled roof and concrete foundation. The eaves of the roof have exposed rafter ends in the Craftsman style. The projecting cross-gable section, which forms the short leg of the T, houses the main entrance in a round-arch recess. The school was built in 1938 with funding support from the Works Progress Administration, and was used as a school until 1960. It was also an important community resource, playing host to social events and community meetings.

The building was listed on the National Register of Historic Places in 2000.

The buildings and land were sold at auction in 1968, and the Fair View School became a private residence.

== See also ==
- National Register of Historic Places listings in Pope County, Arkansas
