= Girls' Domestic Science and Arts Building =

- Girls' Domestic Science and Arts Building--Arkansas Tech University
- U.S. National Register of Historic Places
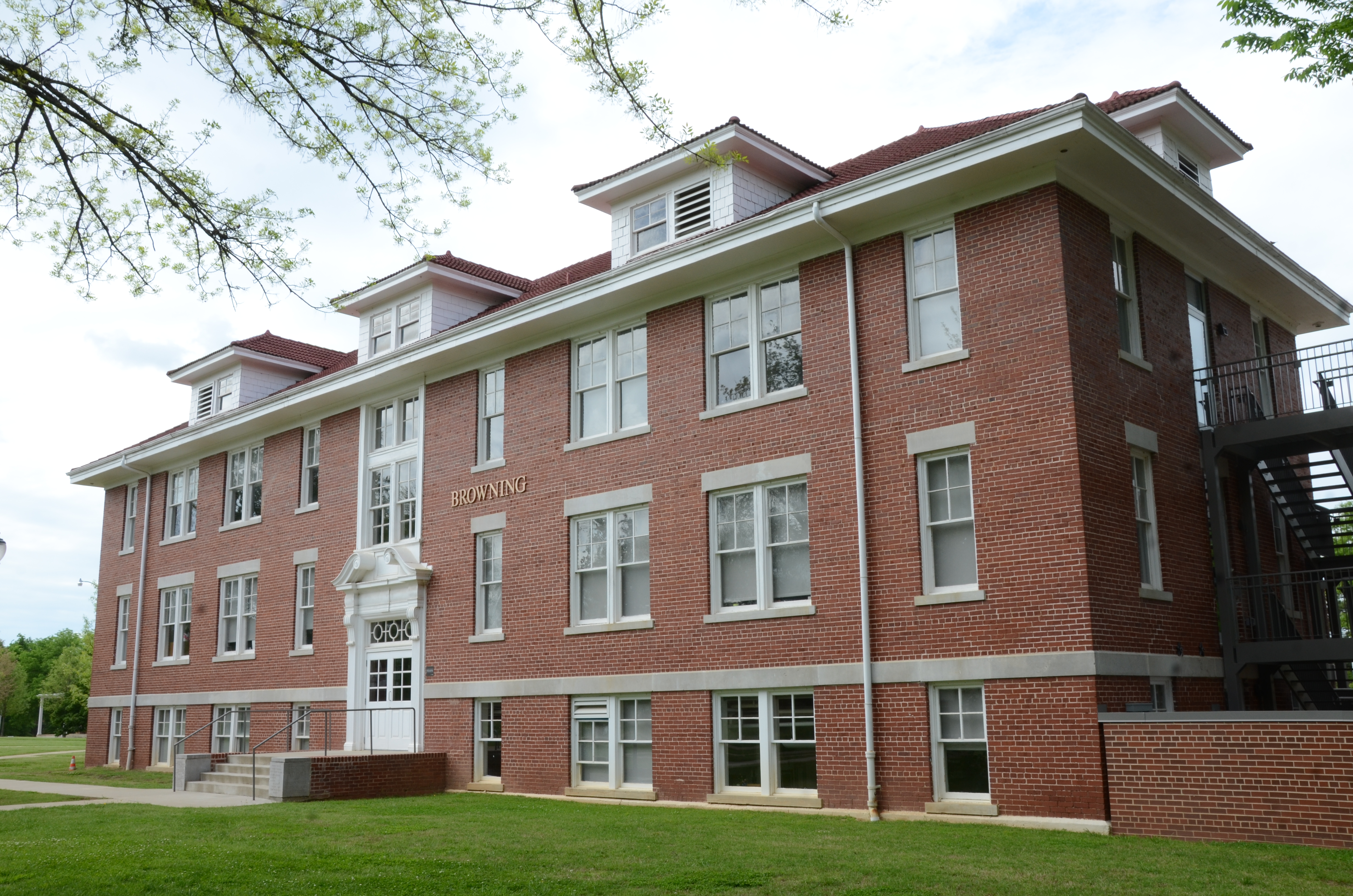

- Location within Arkansas Location within the United States
- Location: E of N. El Paso St., Russellville, Arkansas
- Coordinates: 35°17′34″N 93°8′5″W
- Area: less than one acre
- Built by: Federal Emergency Administration
- Architectural style: Late 19th and Early 20th Century American Movements, Plain Traditional
- MPS: Public Schools in the Ozarks MPS
- NRHP reference No.: 92001212
- Added to NRHP: September 18, 1992

The Girls' Domestic Science and Arts Building is an academic building on the campus of the Arkansas Tech University in Russellville, Arkansas. It is a 2 1/2-story masonry building, with a tile hip roof, and walls finished in brick and stone. The roof is pierced by hip-roofed dormers on both the long and short sides. It was built in 1913 and extensively renovated in 1935. It is now known as the Old Art Building. The Public Works Administration provided funds for school construction in January 1934, of which $7,500 was allocated for renovating this building.

The building was listed on the U.S. National Register of Historic Places in 1992.

== See also ==
- National Register of Historic Places listings in Pope County, Arkansas
