= Wilson Hall (Arkansas Tech University) =

- Wilson Hall-Arkansas Tech University
- U.S. National Register of Historic Places
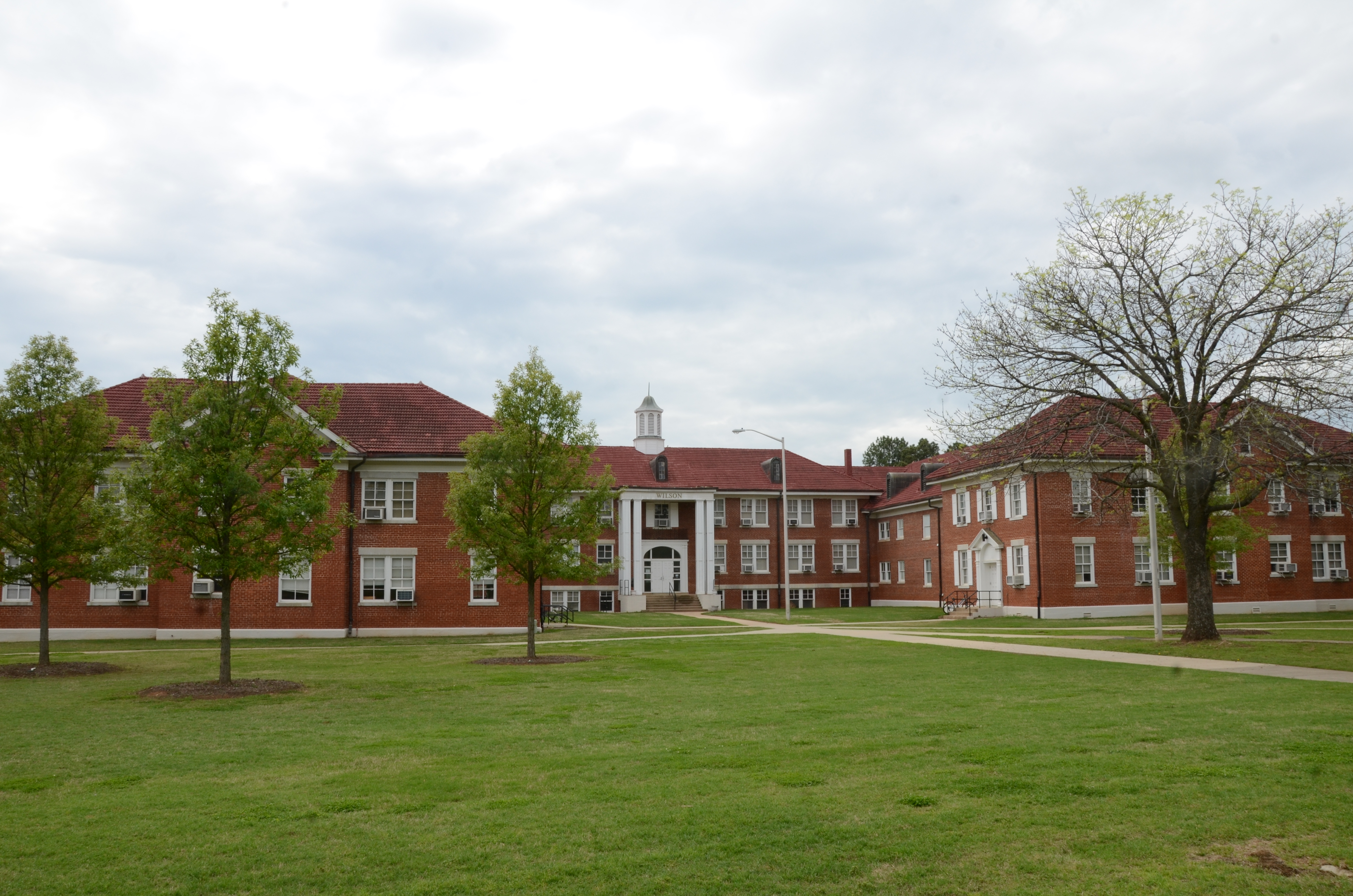

- Location within Arkansas Location within the United States
- Location: N. El Paso St., Russellville, Arkansas
- Coordinates: 35°17′33″N 93°8′15″W
- Area: 2.3 acres (0.93 ha)
- Built: 1925
- Architectural style: Colonial Revival
- MPS: Public Schools in the Ozarks MPS
- NRHP reference No.: 92001209
- Added to NRHP: September 18, 1992

Wilson Hall is a historic dormitory building on the campus of Arkansas Tech University in Russellville, Arkansas. It is located on the west side of North El Paso Street, just north of West M Street. It is a large two-story brick building with Colonial Revival styling, consisting of a central block, from which symmetrical wings extend forward from its ends, ending in slightly wider "houses". It was built in 1925, during a period of expansion in which the school, then the Second District Agricultural School, began offering four-year degree programs.

The building was listed on the National Register of Historic Places in 1992.

== See also ==
- National Register of Historic Places listings in Pope County, Arkansas
