= Archeological Site 3PP141 =

Archaeological site in Arkansas, United States

- U.S. National Register of Historic Places
- Nearest city: Atkins, Arkansas
- Area: less than one acre
- MPS: Rock Art Sites in Arkansas TR
- NRHP reference No.: 06000837
- Added to NRHP: November 8, 2006

Archeological Site 3PP141 is a prehistoric rock art site in Pope County, Arkansas. The art at the site, which is on state-owned land, is believed to have been painted during the period of the Mississippian culture. The 28 drawings at this site are part of a larger collection within the state that are expected to improve the understanding of Mississippian religious practices during that time.

The site was listed on the National Register of Historic Places in 2006,

== See also ==
- Archeological Site 3PP142
- National Register of Historic Places listings in Pope County, Arkansas
