= Atkins Commercial Historic District =

Historic district in Arkansas, United States

- U.S. National Register of Historic Places
- U.S. Historic district
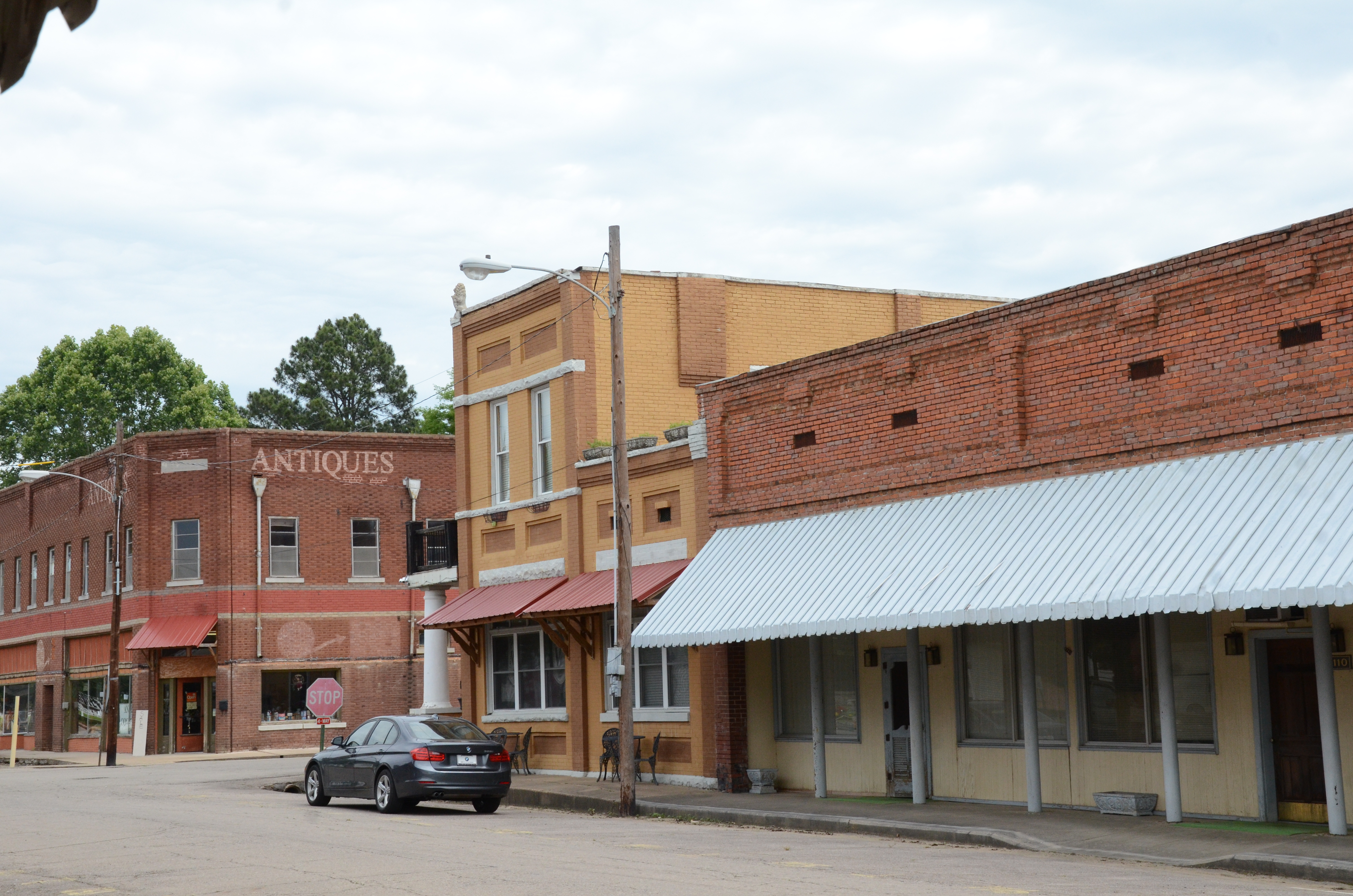

- Location within Arkansas Location within the United States
- Location: Roughly bounded by Main, Church, & 1st Sts., * Ave. 2., Atkins, Arkansas
- Coordinates: 35°14′33″N 92°56′18″W
- Area: 7.6 acres (3.1 ha)
- Built: 1890
- Architect: Saxton, Bill; Bracy, Gene
- Architectural style: Early Commercial
- NRHP reference No.: 09000739
- Added to NRHP: September 18, 2009

The Atkins Commercial Historic District encompasses the historic business district of Atkins, Arkansas. It extends for two blocks on Main Street and 1st Street, between Church and 2nd Avenues. This area was largely developed between 1890 and 1959 as a trade and manufacturing center for the surrounding area, with most of its architecture dating before 1921. Most of the buildings are brick single-story buildings with vernacular commercial designs.

The district was listed on the National Register of Historic Places in 2009.

== See also ==
- National Register of Historic Places listings in Pope County, Arkansas
