= First Christian Church (Russellville, Arkansas) =

Historic church in Arkansas, United States

- U.S. National Register of Historic Places
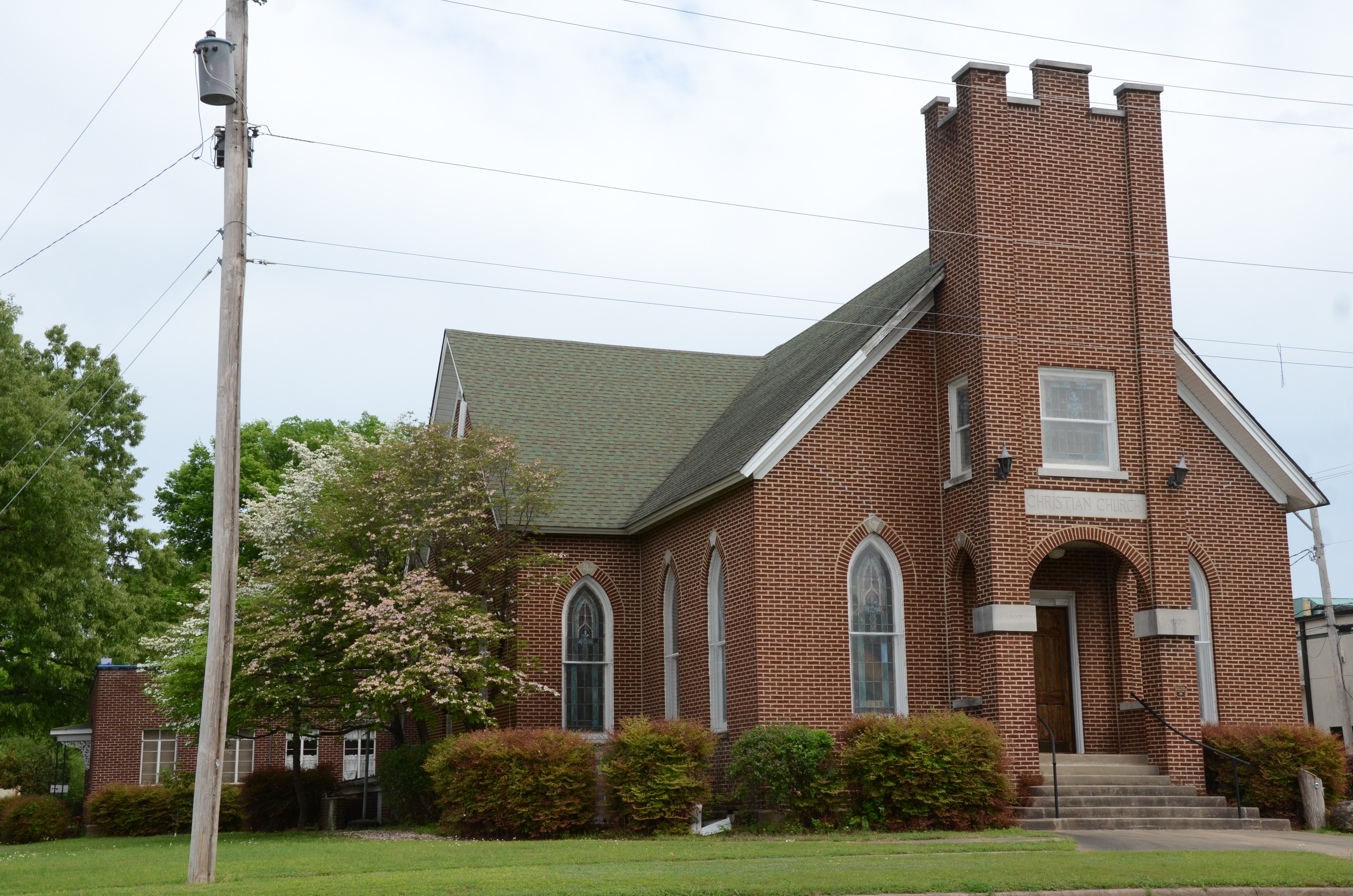

- Location within Arkansas Location within the United States
- Location: 103 S. Boston Ave., Russellville, Arkansas
- Coordinates: 35°16′47″N 93°7′55″W
- Area: less than one acre
- Built: 1885
- Architect: Price, J.D.; Eaton, J.P. & A.K. Bollinger
- Architectural style: Gothic Revival
- NRHP reference No.: 06000418
- Added to NRHP: May 24, 2006

The First Christian Church in downtown Russellville, Arkansas, is a historic church at the intersection of South Boston Avenue and East Main Place. The original single-story building was designed by architect J. D. Price of Philadelphia, Pennsylvania, and constructed by local contractors J. P. Eaton and A. K. Bollinger in 1885-86 as a wood-frame building with a Carpenter Gothic cruciform sanctuary design.

A 1925 expansion by builders J.C. and Warren Woodson, brothers, added 35 feet to the structure's rear, matching the building's original height and pitch of the roof. The project also added a front entrance portico, applied a brick veneer to the building’s exterior, installed stained-glass windows in the entry area and sanctuary to replace opaque, amber-colored panes used in the original construction, and modified the church’s interior.

An education annex at the rear of the church was added in 1953–54.

It was built for a congregation affiliated with the Disciples of Christ, which was founded in 1882. It was judged one of the most expensive wooden churches in the state when it was built.

The building was listed on the National Register of Historic Places in 2006.

== See also ==
- National Register of Historic Places listings in Pope County, Arkansas
