= Archeological Site 3PP614 =

Archaeological site in Arkansas, United States

- U.S. National Register of Historic Places
- Nearest city: Sand Gap, Arkansas
- Area: less than one acre
- MPS: Rock Art Sites in Arkansas TR
- NRHP reference No.: 07000203
- Added to NRHP: May 23, 2007

Archeological Site 3PP144 is a prehistoric rock art site in Pope County, Arkansas, United States. The art at the site, which is Ozark-St. Francis National Forest, consists two drawings in black pigment, of unknown age. This site are part of a larger collection within the state that are expected to improve the understanding of how rock art in the Ozark Mountains region was made, and for what purpose.

The site was listed on the National Register of Historic Places in 2007.

== See also ==
- National Register of Historic Places listings in Pope County, Arkansas
