= Crow Mountain Petroglyph =

Archaeological site in Arkansas, United States

- U.S. National Register of Historic Places
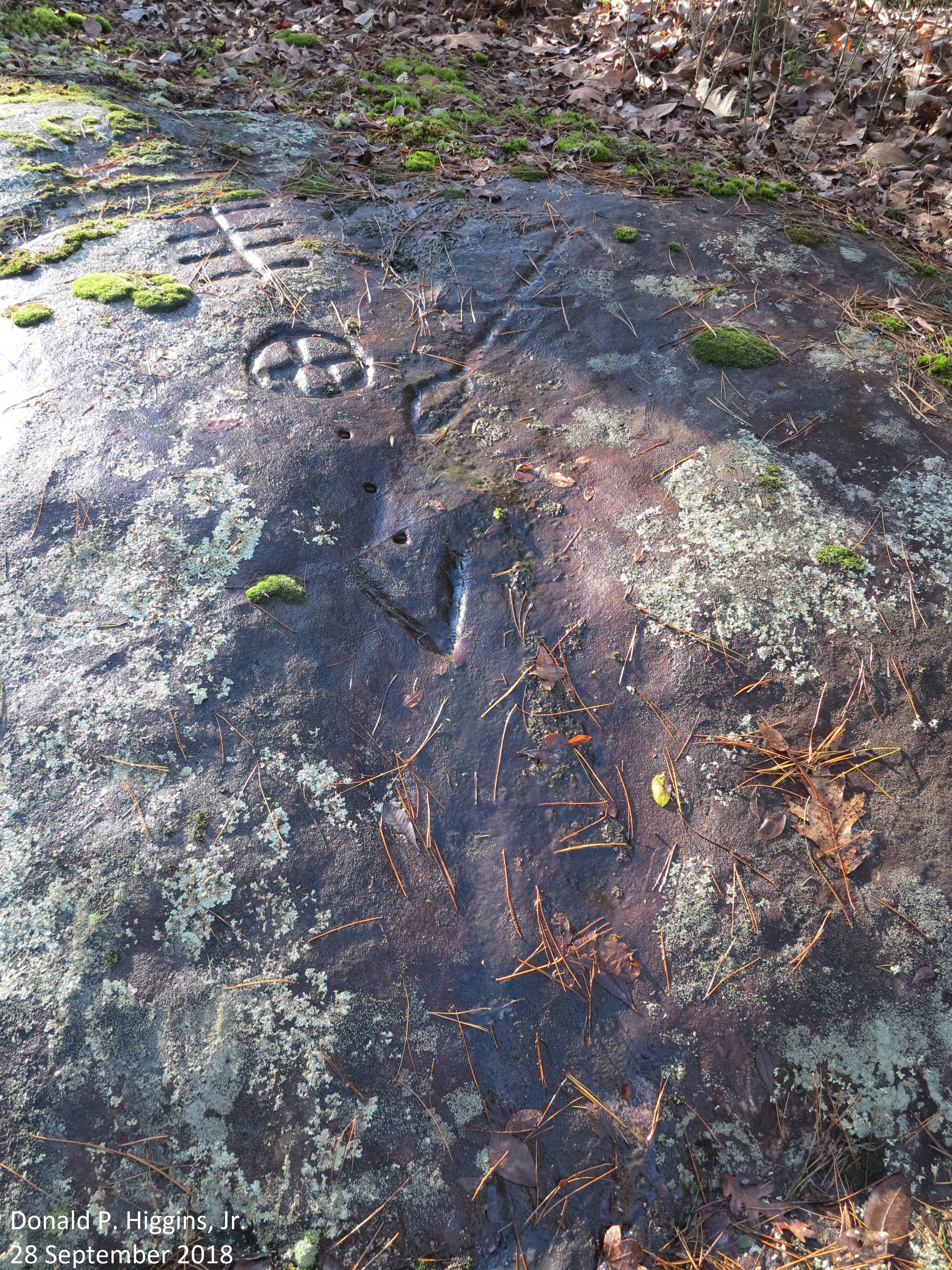
- Nearest city: Dover, Arkansas
- Area: 0.1 acres (0.040 ha)
- MPS: Rock Art Sites in Arkansas TR
- NRHP reference No.: 82004838
- Added to NRHP: May 4, 1982

The Crow Mountain Petroglyph is a small petroglyph rock art panel in Pope County, Arkansas. The panel includes a sun motif and an arrow, both of which have been pecked into the rock. Although its provenance and age are unknown, it is similar in style to other examples of rock art in the United States. The arrow was observed on December 21, 1978 (the winter solstice) to point at the location of that day's sunset, so its use as a prehistoric solstice marker cannot be ruled out.

The rock art panel was listed on the National Register of Historic Places in 1982.

== See also ==
- National Register of Historic Places listings in Pope County, Arkansas
