= Pottsville Dipping Vat =

- U.S. National Register of Historic Places
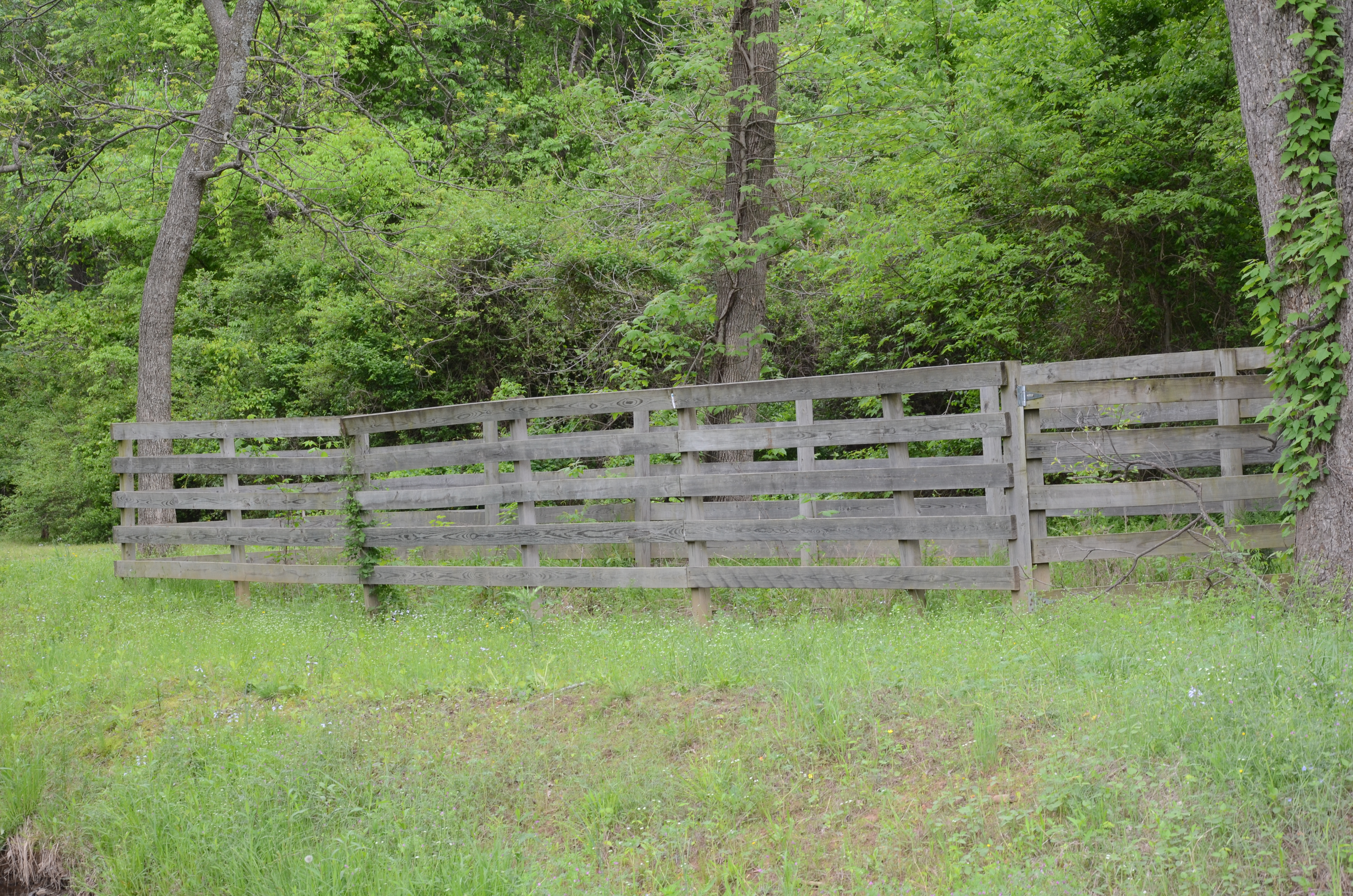

- Location within Arkansas Location within the United States
- Location: Corner of Rankin Park on E. Ash St., Pottsville, Arkansas
- Coordinates: 35°15′8″N 93°2′48″W
- Area: less than one acre
- Built: 1915
- MPS: Dip That Tick:Texas Tick Fever Eradication in Arkansas MPS
- NRHP reference No.: 06000086
- Added to NRHP: March 2, 2006

The Pottsville Dipping Vat is a historic cattle processing structure in Rankin Park, on East Ash Street, in Pottsville, Arkansas. It consists of a U-shaped concrete structure, with an extended base at one end. The structure has a total length of 42 feet (13 m), and the vat is 2 feet (0.61 m) wide and 7 feet (2.1 m) deep. It was probably built about 1915, not long after the state began a program to eradicate Texas cattle fever from its livestock.

The vat was listed on the National Register of Historic Places in 2006.

== See also ==
- National Register of Historic Places listings in Pope County, Arkansas
