= John W. White House =

Historic house in Arkansas, United States

- U.S. National Register of Historic Places
- U.S. Historic district
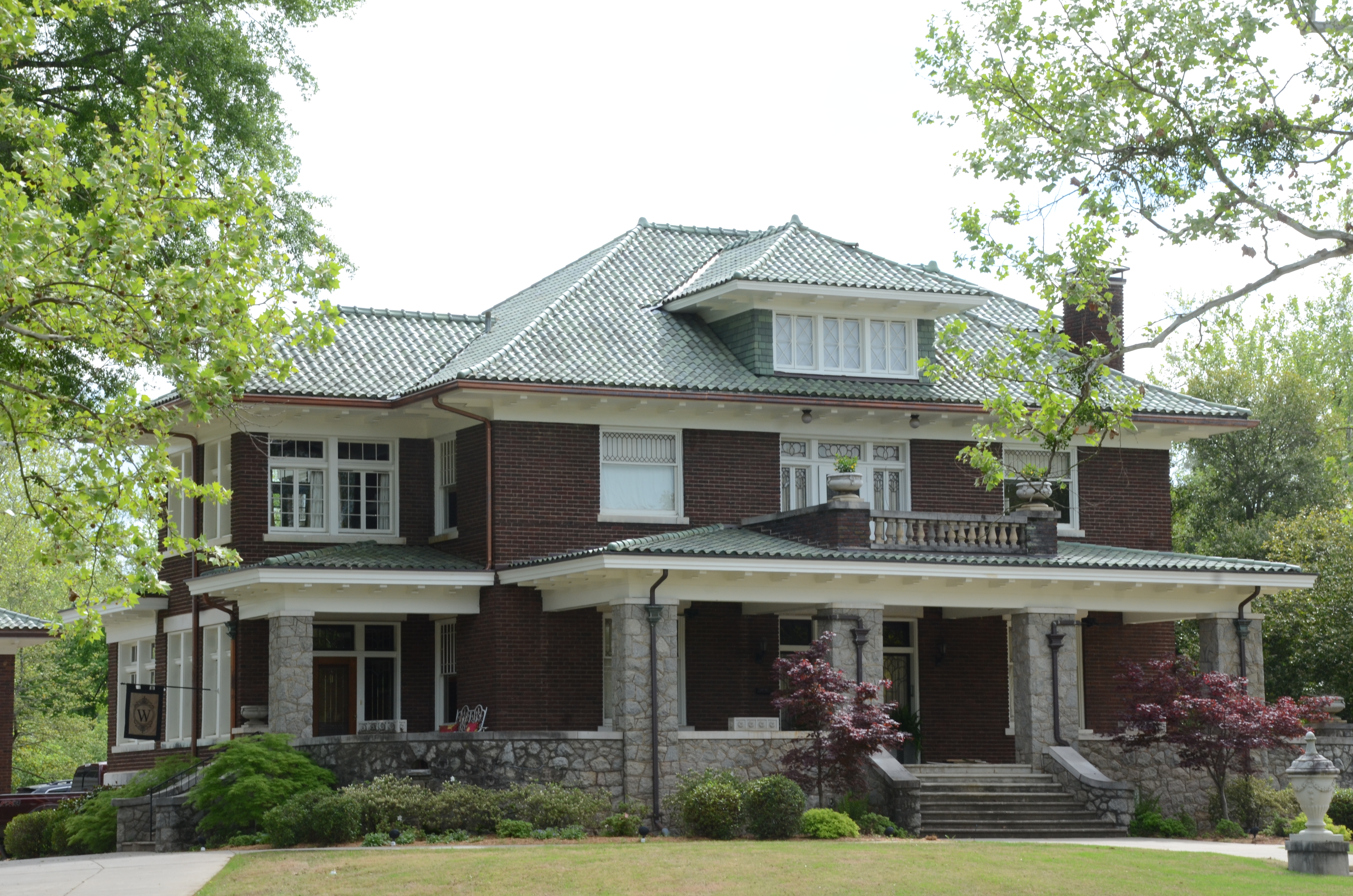

- Location within Arkansas Location within the United States
- Location: 1509 W. Main St., Russellville, Arkansas
- Coordinates: 35°16′55″N 93°8′48″W
- Area: 2.3 acres (0.93 ha)
- Built: 1916
- Architect: Frank M. Blaisdell; Paul M. Heerwagen
- Architectural style: Prairie School, Bungalow/craftsman
- NRHP reference No.: 88000524
- Added to NRHP: May 5, 1988

The John W. White House is a historic house at 1509 West Main Street in Russellville, Arkansas. It is a broad two-story brick structure, in a broad expression of the American Foursquare style with Prairie School and Craftsman elements. It is covered by a hipped tile roof, with a hipped dormer on the front roof face. A single-story hip-roof porch extends across the front, supported by rustic stone piers and balustrade. The house was built in 1916 for a wealthy banker and businessman, and is one of the finest high-style houses in the city.

The house was listed on the National Register of Historic Places in 1988.

== See also ==
- National Register of Historic Places listings in Pope County, Arkansas
