= National Register of Historic Places listings in Pope County, Arkansas =

Location of Pope County in Arkansas

This is a list of the National Register of Historic Places listings in Pope County, Arkansas.

This is intended to be a complete list of the properties and districts on the National Register of Historic Places in Pope County, Arkansas, United States. The locations of National Register properties and districts for which the latitude and longitude coordinates are included below, may be seen in a map.

There are 43 properties and districts listed on the National Register in the county. Another two properties were formerly listed.

Contents: Counties in Arkansas
- Arkansas
- Ashley
- Baxter
- Benton
- Boone
- Bradley
- Calhoun
- Carroll
- Chicot
- Clark
- Clay
- Cleburne
- Cleveland
- Columbia
- Conway
- Craighead
- Crawford
- Crittenden
- Cross
- Dallas
- Desha
- Drew
- Faulkner
- Franklin
- Fulton
- Garland
- Grant
- Greene
- Hempstead
- Hot Spring
- Howard
- Independence
- Izard
- Jackson
- Jefferson
- Johnson
- Lafayette
- Lawrence
- Lee
- Lincoln
- Little River
- Logan
- Lonoke
- Madison
- Marion
- Miller
- Mississippi
- Monroe
- Montgomery
- Nevada
- Newton
- Ouachita
- Perry
- Phillips
- Pike
- Poinsett
- Polk
- Pope
- Prairie
- Pulaski (Little Rock)
- Randolph
- St. Francis
- Saline
- Scott
- Searcy
- Sebastian
- Sevier
- Sharp
- Stone
- Union
- Van Buren
- Washington
- White
- Woodruff
- Yell

This National Park Service list is complete through NPS recent listings posted September 11, 2026.

== Current listings ==
	Name on the Register	Image	Date listed	Location	City or town	Description
1	Archeological Site 3PP141		November 8, 2006 (#06000837)	Address Restricted	Atkins	
2	Archeological Site 3PP142		November 8, 2006 (#06000839)	Address Restricted	Atkins	
3	Archeological Site 3PP614		May 23, 2007 (#07000203)	Address Restricted	Sand Gap	
4	Arkansas Tech University Historic District		September 14, 2026 (#100013413)	Roughly bounded by West Q Street on the north. North El Paso and North Arkansas avenues on the east. West M Street on the south. and North Glenwood Avenue on the west 35°17′35″N 93°08′13″W	Russellville	
5	Atkins Commercial Historic District	Atkins Commercial Historic District	September 18, 2009 (#09000739)	Roughly bounded by Main, Church, and 1st Sts., Ave. 2. 35°14′33″N 92°56′18″W	Atkins	
6	Caraway Hall-Arkansas Tech University	Caraway Hall-Arkansas Tech University	September 10, 1992 (#92001213)	N. Arkansas St. 35°17′33″N 93°08′02″W	Russellville	
7	Center Valley Well House	Center Valley Well House	September 10, 1992 (#92001206)	Highway 124; 35°19′47″N 93°05′09″W	Center Valley	
8	Confederate Mothers Memorial Park	Confederate Mothers Memorial Park	May 3, 1996 (#96000500)	Junction of Highway 326 and S. Glenwood Ave. 35°15′30″N 93°08′26″W	Russellville	
9	Crow Mountain Petroglyph	Crow Mountain Petroglyph	May 4, 1982 (#82004838)	Address Restricted	Dover	
10	Fair View School	Fair View School	February 4, 2000 (#00000030)	2367 Mill Creek Rd. 35°21′13″N 93°12′41″W	Russellville	
11	First Christian Church	First Christian Church	May 24, 2006 (#06000418)	103 S. Boston Ave. 35°16′47″N 93°07′55″W	Russellville	
12	Girls' Domestic Science and Arts Building-Arkansas Tech University	Girls' Domestic Science and Arts Building-Arkansas Tech University	September 18, 1992 (#92001212)	East of N. El Paso St. 35°17′33″N 93°08′04″W	Russellville	
13	Thomas J. Hankins House	Thomas J. Hankins House	September 30, 2013 (#13000788)	Western side of Highway 7 approximately 375 feet north of its junction with Highway 123; 35°43′19″N 93°05′47″W	Pelsor	
14	Hughes Hall-Arkansas Tech University	Hughes Hall-Arkansas Tech University	September 18, 1992 (#92001210)	W. M St. 35°17′32″N 93°08′20″W	Russellville	
15	Henry R. Koen Forest Service Building	Henry R. Koen Forest Service Building	December 11, 1989 (#89001628)	605 W. Main St. 35°16′43″N 93°08′20″W	Russellville	
16	Latimore Tourist Home	Latimore Tourist Home	January 27, 2012 (#11001049)	S. Houston Ave. and West 5th St. 35°16′27″N 93°08′25″W	Russellville	part of the Arkansas Highway History and Architecture Multiple Property Submission
17	Little Rock to Cantonment Gibson Rd-Fourth Street Segment	Little Rock to Cantonment Gibson Rd-Fourth Street Segment	January 22, 2009 (#08001342)	4th St. between Union Grove and Blackland Sts. 35°14′15″N 92°53′56″W	Atkins	A Trail of Tears site
18	Missouri-Pacific Depot-Atkins	Missouri-Pacific Depot-Atkins	June 11, 1992 (#92000600)	U.S. Route 64; 35°14′30″N 92°56′07″W	Atkins	
19	Missouri-Pacific Depot-Russellville	Missouri-Pacific Depot-Russellville	June 11, 1992 (#92000620)	North of the junction of C St. and Denver Ave. 35°16′49″N 93°08′07″W	Russellville	
20	Mountain View School	Mountain View School	September 10, 1992 (#92001207)	109 Hilltop Dr. (Highway 326); 35°16′32″N 93°10′14″W	Russellville	Now used as a fire station
21	Norristown Cemetery	Norristown Cemetery	April 14, 1995 (#94001415)	Off Highway 78 on Lock and Dam Rd. 35°14′35″N 93°09′01″W	Russellville	
22	William H. Norwood House		May 29, 2019 (#100003988)	1602 W. Main St. 35°16′56″N 93°08′54″W	Russellville	
23	Old Town Historic District		September 19, 2024 (#100010836)	Roughly bounded by W. 3rd St. Boulder Ave.. W. 8th St.. and S. Glenwood Ave. 35°16′27″N 93°08′15″W	Russellville	
24	Physical Education Building-Arkansas Tech University	Physical Education Building-Arkansas Tech University	September 10, 1992 (#92001211)	Southeastern corner of the junction of N. El Paso and W. O Sts. 35°17′36″N 93°08′11″W	Russellville	
25	Potts Inn	Potts Inn	June 22, 1970 (#70000123)	Main and Center Sts. 35°14′54″N 93°02′42″W	Pottsville	
26	Pottsville Citizen's Bank	Pottsville Citizen's Bank	March 28, 2002 (#02000261)	156 E. Ash St. 35°14′59″N 93°02′45″W	Pottsville	
27	Pottsville Commercial Historic District	Pottsville Commercial Historic District	January 20, 2005 (#04001510)	155, 160, 162, and 164 E. Ash St. 35°15′07″N 93°02′50″W	Pottsville	
28	Pottsville Dipping Vat	Pottsville Dipping Vat	March 2, 2006 (#06000086)	Corner of Rankin Park on E. Ash St. 35°15′08″N 93°02′48″W	Pottsville	
29	Reed Cemetery	Reed Cemetery	October 12, 2023 (#100009433)	West 12th St. bordered by South Muskogee and South Phoenix Aves. 35°16′05″N 93°08′54″W	Russellville	
30	Riggs-Hamilton American Legion Post No. 20	Riggs-Hamilton American Legion Post No. 20	August 15, 1994 (#94000855)	215 N. Denver Ave. 35°16′48″N 93°08′09″W	Russellville	
31	Will Rogers Memorial		May 22, 2026 (#100013023)	East side of North Arkansas Street, approximately 600 feet north of Arkansas Highway 7; 35°17′43″N 93°07′59″W	Russellville	
32	Russellville Downtown Historic District	Russellville Downtown Historic District	September 3, 1996 (#96000941)	Roughly bounded by W. 2nd St., Arkansas Ave., the former Missouri Pacific railroad tracks, and El Paso St. 35°16′44″N 93°08′06″W	Russellville	
33	Russellville Masonic Temple	Russellville Masonic Temple	June 1, 2005 (#05000499)	205 S. Commerce; 35°16′39″N 93°08′07″W	Russellville	
34	Russellville Public Library	Russellville Public Library	November 20, 2000 (#00001319)	114 E. 3rd St. 35°16′32″N 93°08′00″W	Russellville	1937 WPA Colonial Revival building, next to the current library.
35	Russellville West Overpass		September 17, 2021 (#100006927)	US 64 (West Main St.) over the Union Pacific RR Line; 35°18′11″N 93°10′14″W	Russellville	
36	Threlkeld House	Threlkeld House	June 2, 2000 (#00000610)	1301 N. Boston Ave. 35°17′27″N 93°07′56″W	Russellville	
37	John E. Tucker Coliseum		May 18, 2026 (#100013016)	1604 N. Coliseum Drive; 35°17′43″N 93°07′58″W	Russellville	
38	Old US 64, Scotia Segment	Old US 64, Scotia Segment	September 19, 2007 (#07000959)	South of U.S. Route 64, east of Cedar Ln. 35°19′56″N 93°17′40″W	London	A Trail of Tears site
39	John W. White House	John W. White House	May 5, 1988 (#88000524)	1509 W. Main St. 35°16′55″N 93°08′48″W	Russellville	
40	W.J. White House	W.J. White House	December 13, 1978 (#78000617)	1412 W. Main St. 35°16′57″N 93°08′54″W	Russellville	
41	Williamson Hall-Arkansas Tech University	Williamson Hall-Arkansas Tech University	September 18, 1992 (#92001208)	N. El Paso St. 35°17′25″N 93°08′13″W	Russellville	Apr 03, 2019 - Fire destroyed a major part of the building
42	Wilson Hall-Arkansas Tech University	Wilson Hall-Arkansas Tech University	September 18, 1992 (#92001209)	N. El Paso St. 35°17′33″N 93°08′15″W	Russellville	
43	Wilson House	Wilson House	March 29, 1978 (#78000618)	214 E. 5th St. 35°16′25″N 93°07′51″W	Russellville	

== Former listing ==
	Name on the Register	Image	Date listed	Date removed	Location	City or town	Description
1	Galla Creek Bridge		February 25, 1993 (#93000090)	March 31, 2000	Old AR 64 over Galla Cr.	Pottsville	
2	Old South Restaurant	Old South Restaurant	September 3, 1999 (#99001064)	January 2, 2024	1330 E. Main St. 35°16′41″N 93°07′01″W	Russellville	

== See also ==
- List of National Historic Landmarks in Arkansas
- National Register of Historic Places listings in Arkansas
