= Pope County, Arkansas, Public Library =

- Pope County Public Library
- U.S. National Register of Historic Places
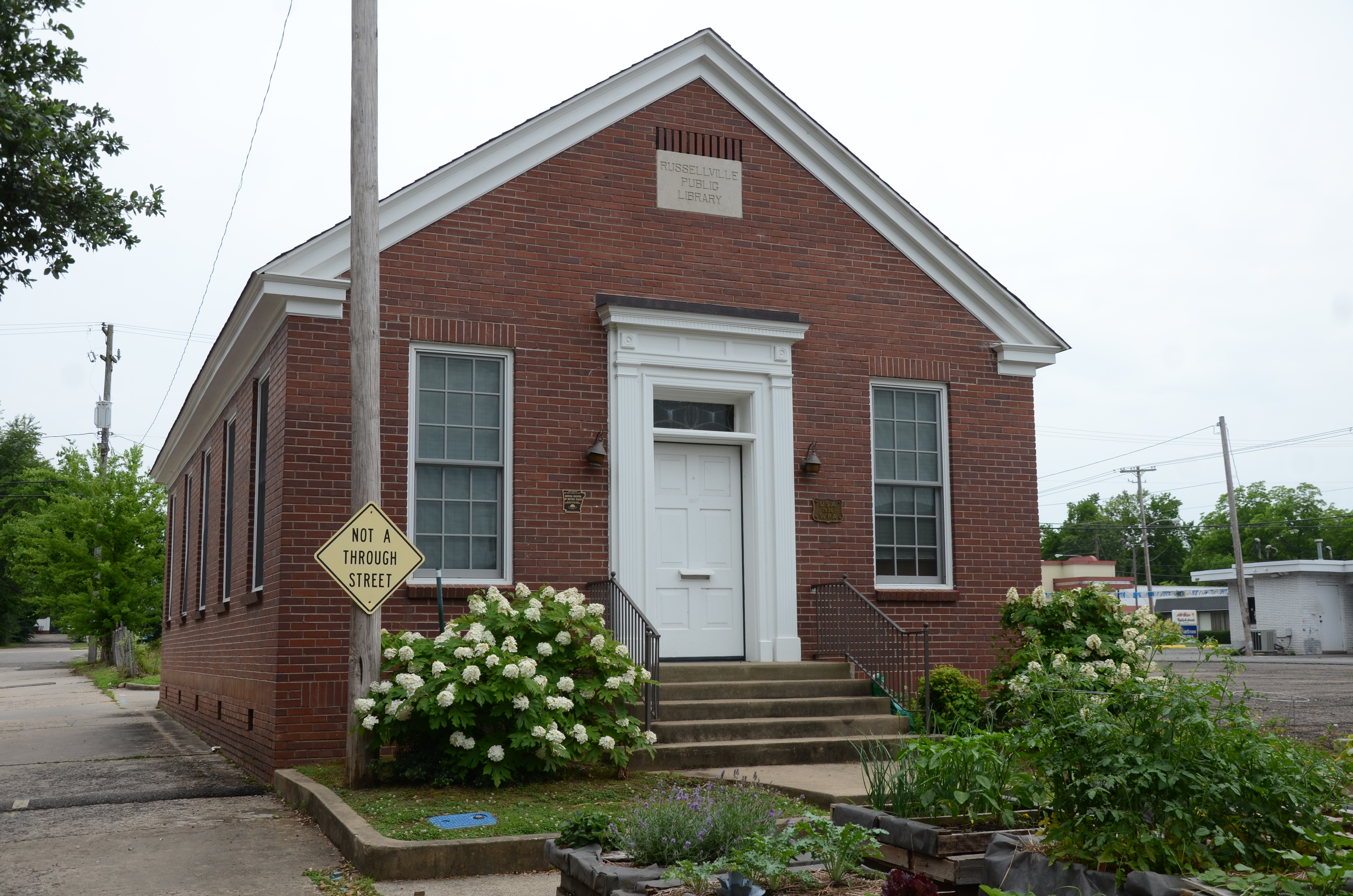
- The historic library building, next to the modern library.

- Location within Arkansas Location within the United States
- Location: 114 E. Third St., Russellville, Arkansas
- Coordinates: 35°16′32″N 93°8′0″W
- Area: less than one acre
- Built: 1937
- Built by: O.S. Nelson
- Architect: O.S. Nelson
- Architectural style: Colonial Revival
- NRHP reference No.: 00001319
- Added to NRHP: November 20, 2000

The Pope County Public Library is the public library serving Russellville, Arkansas and the surrounding area. It is the main branch of the Pope County Library system, located at 116 East Third Street.

There are a variety of free programs and events scheduled regularly, geared towards all ages. Some of these are a summer reading program, Reading Dragons and Friends, Adult Life Skills: Pet Care, and Family Game Night.

== Historical building ==
Located next to the current library facility is the library's first building, a single-story brick structure funded by the Works Progress Administration in 1936–37. It was designed and built by O.S. Nelson, a local contractor, in the Colonial Revival style. It housed the library until 1976. It was listed on the National Register of Historic Places in 2000.

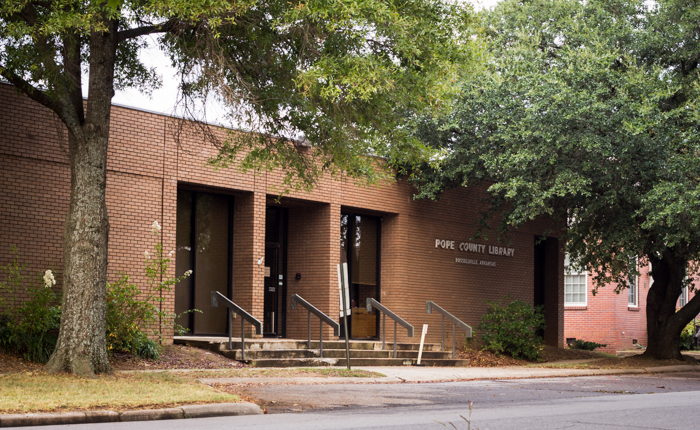
Russellville public library modern building

== See also ==
- National Register of Historic Places listings in Pope County, Arkansas
