= Atkins station =

- Missouri-Pacific Depot, Atkins
- U.S. National Register of Historic Places
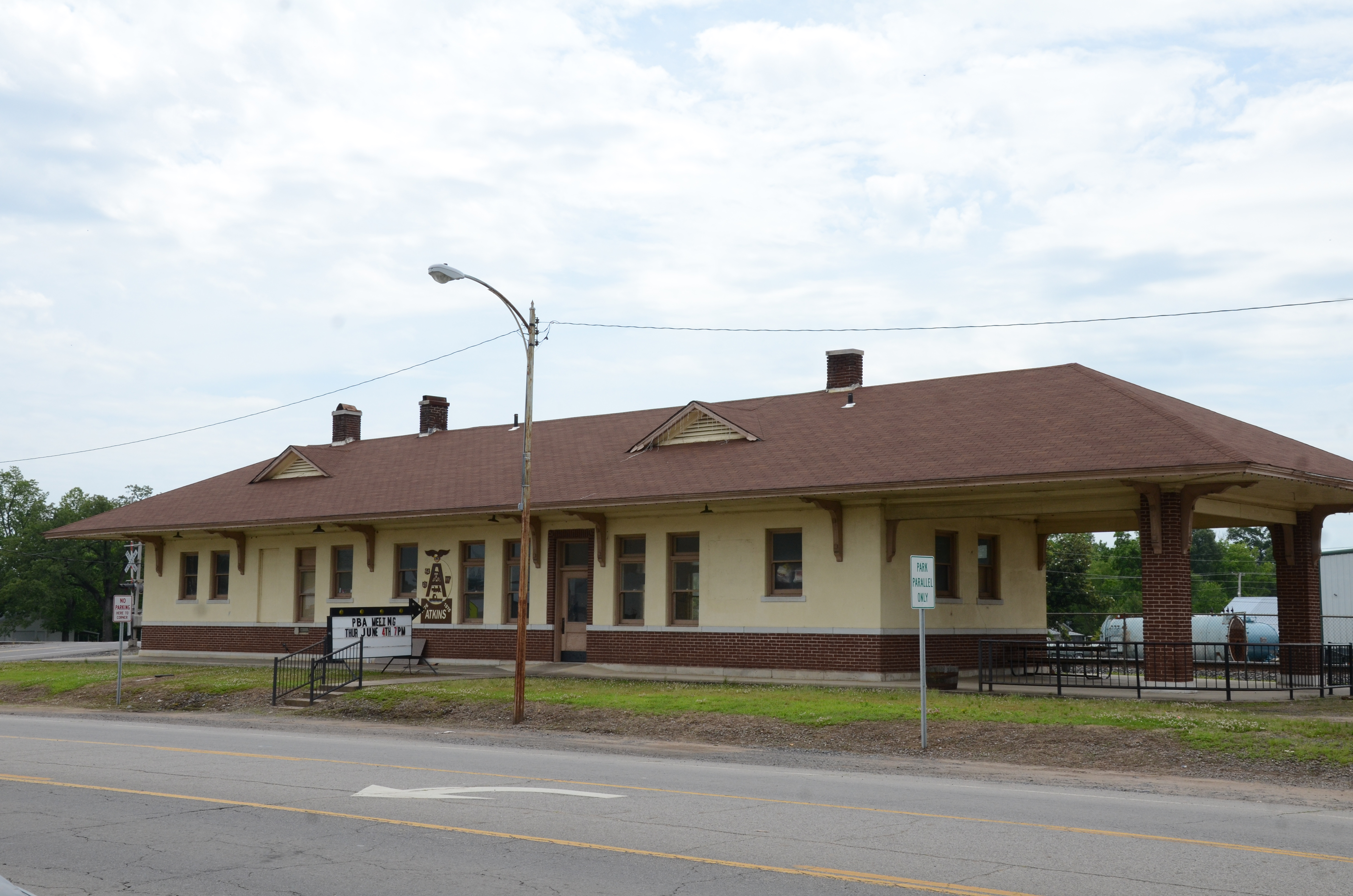

- Location within Arkansas Location within the United States
- Location: US 64, Atkins, Arkansas
- Coordinates: 35°14′30″N 92°56′7″W
- Area: less than one acre
- Built: 1910
- Built by: Missouri-Pacific Railroad
- Architectural style: Late 19th And 20th Century Revivals
- MPS: Historic Railroad Depots of Arkansas MPS
- NRHP reference No.: 92000600
- Added to NRHP: June 11, 1992

The Missouri-Pacific Depot is a historic former railroad station on the south side of United States Route 64 (between 1st and 2nd Avenues) in Atkins, Arkansas. It is a long rectangular single-story masonry building, finished in brick and stucco and covered by a hip roof. At one end, the roof extends beyond the structure to form a sheltered area, and the telegrapher's booth projects from the building's south (track-facing) side. It was built about 1910 by the Missouri-Pacific Railroad, and is typical of that railroad's period stations, having only lost its tile roof.

The depot was listed on the National Register of Historic Places in 1992.

== See also ==
- National Register of Historic Places listings in Pope County, Arkansas
