= Little Rock to Cantonment Gibson Rd-Fourth Street Segment =

- Little Rock to Cantonment Gibson Rd--Fourth Street Segment
- U.S. National Register of Historic Places
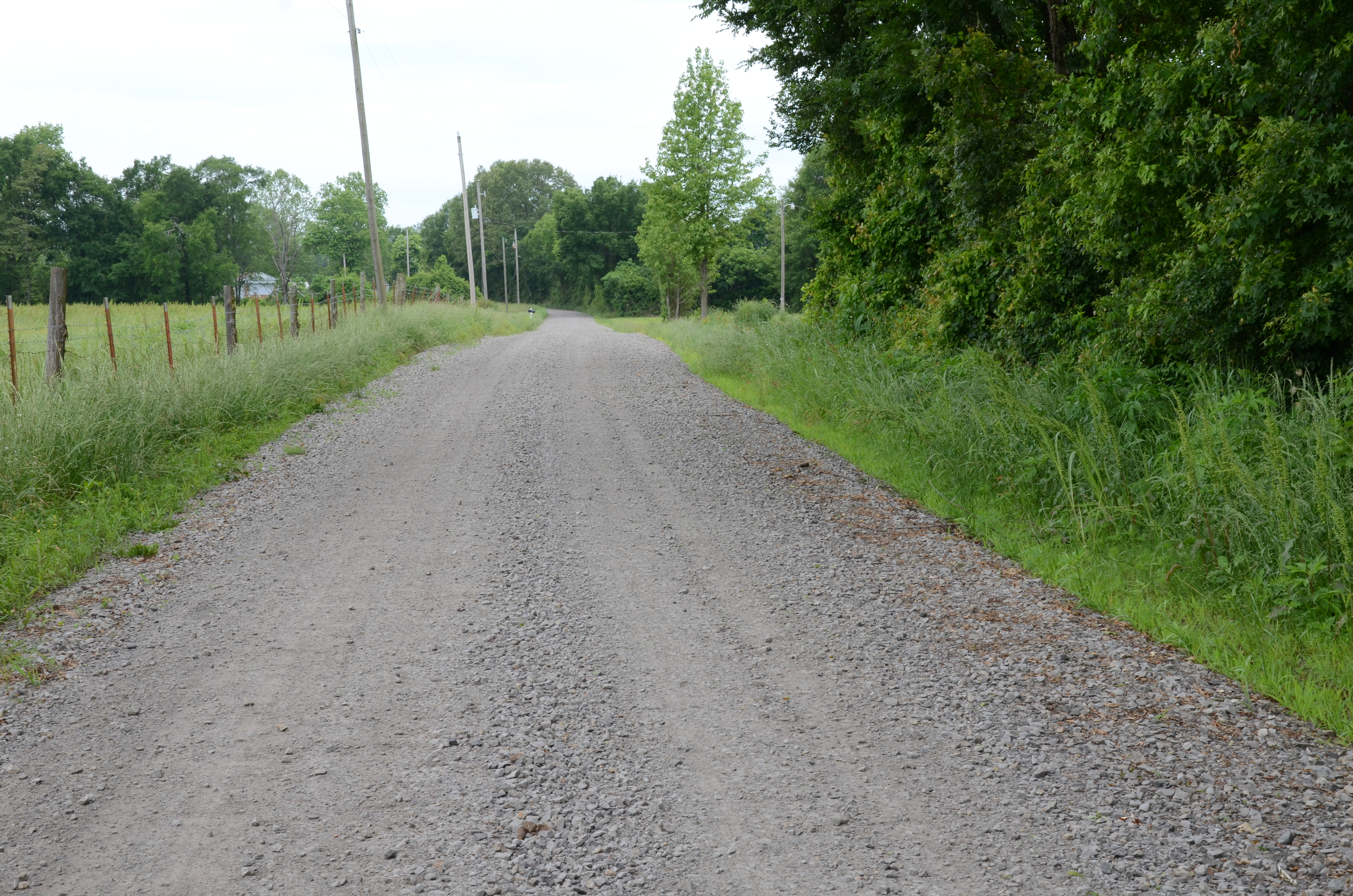

- Location within Arkansas Location within the United States
- Nearest city: Atkins, Arkansas
- Coordinates: 35°14′20″N 92°53′24″W
- Area: less than one acre
- Built: 1828
- Built by: Joseph Henderson
- MPS: Cherokee Trail of Tears MPS
- NRHP reference No.: 08001342
- Added to NRHP: January 22, 2009

The Little Rock to Cantonment Gibson Rd-Fourth Street Segment is a history stretch of 19th-century roadbed in rural Pope County, Arkansas. It consists of about one mile of gravel roadway, now designated Fourth Street, east of Atkins, extending from Union Grove Loop in the west to Oakland Drive in the east. It is about 18 feet (5.5 m) wide, and is built on an embankment for much of its length. Completed by early 1828 as a military road connecting Little Rock to what is now Fort Gibson in Oklahoma, the road is historically significant for its use as part of the Trail of Tears removal of eastern Native Americans to the Indian Territory that is now Oklahoma.

The road section was listed on the National Register of Historic Places in 2009.

== See also ==
- National Register of Historic Places listings in Pope County, Arkansas
