= Russellville, Arkansas =

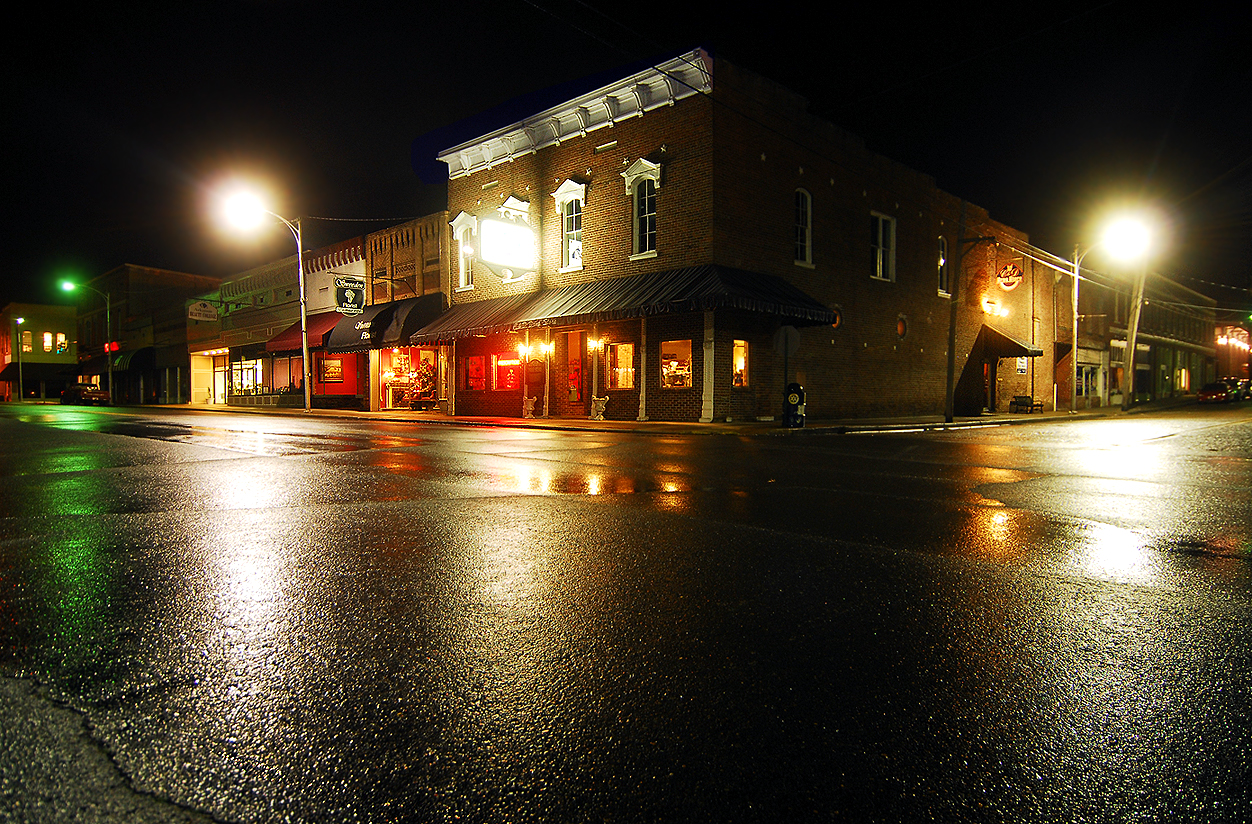
- Russellville Downtown Historic District, 2009

- Flag Logo

- Location of Russellville in Pope County, Arkansas.

- Location within the contiguous United States of America
- Coordinates: 35°16′34″N 93°08′18″W
- Country: United States
- State: Arkansas
- County: Pope
- Townships: Dover, Galla, Illinois
- Founded: circa 1842
- Incorporated: June 7, 1870; 156 years ago
- Named for: Dr. Thomas Russell

Government
  - Mayor: Fred Teague (I)
  - Council: Russellville City Council

Area
  - City: 28.37 sq mi (73.47 km^{2})
  - Land: 28.30 sq mi (73.30 km^{2})
  - Water: 0.066 sq mi (0.17 km^{2})
- Elevation: 367 ft (112 m)

Population (2020)
  - City: 28,940
  - Estimate (2025): 29,521 ▲
  - Density: 1,023/sq mi (394.8/km^{2})
  - Metro: 86,666
- Time zone: UTC-6 (Central (CST))
  - Summer (DST): UTC-5 (CDT)
- ZIP code: 72801, 72802
- Area code: 479
- FIPS code: 05-61670
- GNIS feature ID: 2404658
- Major airport: LIT
- Website: russellvillearkansas.org

Russellville is the county seat of and the largest city in Pope County, Arkansas, United States, with a 2025 estimated population of 30,971. It is home to Arkansas Tech University. Arkansas Nuclear One, Arkansas' only nuclear power plant, is nearby. Russellville borders Lake Dardanelle and the Arkansas River.

It is the principal city of the Russellville micropolitan statistical area, which includes all of Pope and Yell Counties. Under Arkansas Code Title 14, Russellville is a city of the first class.

== History ==
=== Settlement ===
Before the town was named Russellville, its vicinity was known as Chactas Prairie, the Prairie, or Cactus Flats. Located on the southern edge of the Ozark Mountains and north of the Arkansas River, this setting was an ideal settlement area.

Throughout the 18th century into the early 19th century, seasonal movements of the seminomadic Osage Indians from western Missouri brought them annually into Arkansas, including the valley where Russellville is now located. Between 1815 and 1828, the area was within a Cherokee reservation. Under a new treaty concluded on May 6, 1828, the western boundary of Arkansas was established, with seven million acres west of Arkansas in Indian Territory (present-day Oklahoma) provided to the Cherokees "forever". The Cherokees agreed to leave the Arkansas lands within 14 months.

The first house in what is now Russellville, a one-and-a-half-story, hand-hewn log house, was built by J.C. Holledger in 1834 and purchased the next year by Dr. Thomas Russell. One of the first businesses to be established in the town was a store opened in the 1840s by brothers James Madison and Benjamin "BDR" Shinn. In 1852, with a cash capital of $500, Benjamin's son, Jacob Shinn established one of the first general stores—just down the road from the log home of Thomas Russell—in an 18 by 24 ft building. Shinn replaced the wood structure store with a masonry structure, a building completed in 1876 and which, still standing today, is known as the Shinn Building. It was built at the junction of an east–west road from Lewisburg to Clarksville and a north–south road between Dover and the military road crossing at Norristown on the Arkansas River. The intersection is now West Main Street and Denver Avenue (formerly River Street). Before constructing the masonry building, the existing store was moved to the back of Shinn's property and continued operating during construction.

==== Antebellum period ====
About 1842, while still a small hamlet, the community was named Russellville by a majority vote of its citizens in honor of Dr. Thomas Russell, then one of the area's principal landowners and a prominent citizen. A later tradition places the naming on July 4, 1847, when the community reportedly consisted of five homes and a store, and says the choice was between Russellville, for Thomas Russell, and Shinnville, for Jacob L. Shinn. Earlier evidence places the naming around 1842, when Jacob was about sixteen years old. His father, B. D. R. Shinn, and uncle, James Madison Shinn, operated a store in the frontier community during the 1840s. Jacob Shinn entered the mercantile business in Russellville in 1852, when the town had about 50 inhabitants.

A post office was established by 1854.

=== American Civil War ===
As with the war with Mexico in the 1840s, many men of Russellville served in the state's military forces during the American Civil War. Local men served in the state forces early in the war, with many transferring to Confederate regiments by 1862. Several local men were also formed into at least two pro-Union companies. No great battles occurred in or near Russellville, though actions did take place late in the war at nearby Dardanelle (Yell County). While the war officially ended in 1865, peace did not immediately return to the area. Many areas of Pope County were disrupted in the early 1870s by the turmoil of the Pope County Militia War.

=== Reconstruction era ===
The town grew slowly, but in the early 1870s, the railroad was built, and it expanded commercially and experienced a population boom. It connected Russellville to other towns in the area and eventually extended from Ft. Smith to Little Rock, linking other river-valley towns such as Morrilton, Conway, Atkins, and London, and facilitating trade among them. Russellville's first newspaper, the Herald, was founded in 1870. By 1876, the town boasted a population of around 800, served by 15 stores, two cotton gins, and six physicians.

=== Incorporation as a city ===
On June 7, 1870, Russellville became an incorporated city. Incorporation prompted a debate on moving the county seat, located in Dover since 1841, to one of two growing business centers adjacent to the new tracks. An act to move the county seat passed in the General Assembly in 1873 but was repealed during a special session of the General Assembly in 1874. On March 19, 1887, an election was held on whether to move the county seat to Russellville or to Atkins. Russellville was selected by a margin of 128 votes out of 2,670 total votes cast. The question on moving the county seat had also gone to the voters nearly a decade earlier on September 2, 1878, but the results were overturned in the courts.

While formal education came to the Russellville area early with the founding of nearby Dwight Mission in 1820, most early schools were either private or by subscription. The Russellville Public School District was formed in 1870, the year the city was incorporated. By 1876, it had evolved into a nine-month school. By 1890, about 400 students attended in 10 grades, and in 1893, the first class to attend through 12 grades graduated.

Most 19th-century residents of the area farmed for a living, or with the coming of the railroad, harvested timber. By the end of the century, Russellville and the surrounding area had become a prosperous coal-mining region, with the Ouita Coal Company the first to be established. Other coal companies followed, sinking deep mine shafts north and south of town, which by the 1950s had given way to strip mining. Cotton became a profitable crop near Russellville; in the early 20th century, bales were sold from wagons in the middle of Main Street. Today, no coal is mined, and the cotton gins are gone.

=== 20th century ===
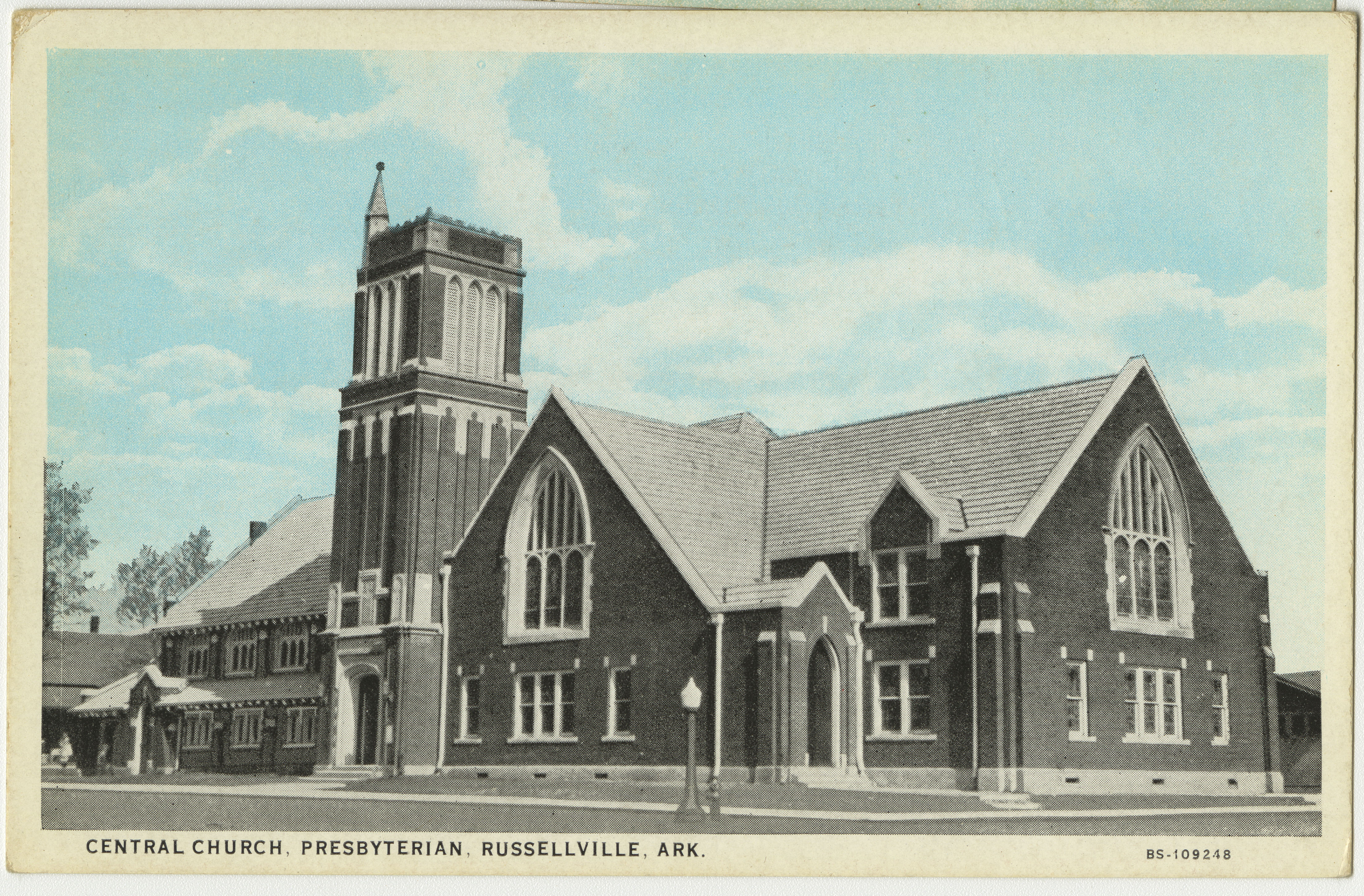
Central Presbyterian Church, 1925

In 1906, the town suffered a massive fire in its central business district. The fire consumed nearly half of the buildings, but they were quickly rebuilt, most within six months after the fire.

What today is Arkansas Tech University (ATU) in Russellville was established in 1910 as the Second District Agricultural School—a four-year high school. The school evolved over the years, adding two years of college courses in the 1920s and dropping the high school courses at the end of the 1929–1930 academic year. The school's name was changed to Arkansas Polytechnic College in 1925. Its name was changed to Arkansas Tech University in 1976.

On February 11, 1930, the Russellville City Council passed an ordinance renaming the city's streets. The ordinance established a logical order for street names and went into effect on April 1, 1930.

With America's entry into World War II, many Russellville men enlisted or were drafted into the military. Many of the local men served in the 153rd Infantry. Battery D and Battery F of the 206th Coast Artillery Regiment of the Arkansas National Guard were initially stationed at ATU. Many of the men saw service in Alaska in what is known as the Williwaw War.

In 1956, the construction of Interstate 40 sparked Russellville's growth. The highway has been a boon to the area's growth, much like the railroad was in the 1870s. A major economic boost resulted from the completion of a dam near the Arkansas River crossing between Dardanelle and Russellville in 1965. The dam created a lake, which led to the establishment of Lake Dardanelle State Park, a major tourist attraction in the area. The completion of the lock and power dam, a part of the McClellan-Kerr Arkansas River Navigation System, which brings in between $1 and $2 billion in trade to the state each year, has greatly improved the area's business prospects.

During the 1970s, the town, like so many other small American towns, witnessed the decentralization of its historic downtown area, due to the advent of large retail outlets such as Walmart. Many of the historic buildings were left to decay or were torn down.

Also in the 1970s, Arkansas' only nuclear power plant, Arkansas Nuclear One, was built just outside the city, on Lake Dardanelle. The plant brought more people and jobs to the city.

=== 2024 solar eclipse ===
Russellville was listed in the top ten places to see the eclipse by Astronomy magazine in 2021. The city hosted a large event, "Moon over Main", during the Solar eclipse of April 8, 2024. The city spent over fifteen months planning for the event, which hosted food trucks, music, and other entertainment. The city saw an influx of nearly 60,000 visitors from 48 states and 12 countries. Nearly 300 couples were married in a mass wedding in a soccer field. Members of the Paris Observatory, NASA, and the U.S. Space and Rocket Center travelled to attend. NASA designated it their home base for the eclipse. The city received four minutes and eleven seconds of totality. Visitors did not affect traffic but greatly increased sales at local businesses. Many came from Texas due to forecasts of cloudy weather.

== Geography ==
Russellville is located at 35°16′42″N 93°8′13″W (35.278429, -93.136820). According to the United States Census Bureau, the city has a total area of 28.3 square miles (73 km^{2}), of which 0.04 square miles (0.10 km^{2}) (0.08%) is covered by water. It is located on the Arkansas River.

=== Climate ===
The climate in this area is characterized by hot, humid summers and generally mild to cool winters. According to the Köppen climate classification, Russellville has a humid subtropical climate, Cfa on climate maps.

Climate data for Russellville Municipal Airport, Arkansas (1991–2020 normals, extremes 1892–present)
Month	Jan	Feb	Mar	Apr	May	Jun	Jul	Aug	Sep	Oct	Nov	Dec	Year
Record high °F (°C)	82 (28)	89 (32)	95 (35)	100 (38)	100 (38)	109 (43)	113 (45)	115 (46)	110 (43)	99 (37)	88 (31)	81 (27)	115 (46)
Mean daily maximum °F (°C)	50.3 (10.2)	55.0 (12.8)	64.3 (17.9)	72.9 (22.7)	80.3 (26.8)	88.2 (31.2)	92.5 (33.6)	92.4 (33.6)	85.6 (29.8)	74.4 (23.6)	61.8 (16.6)	52.2 (11.2)	72.5 (22.5)
Daily mean °F (°C)	40.0 (4.4)	44.0 (6.7)	52.5 (11.4)	61.0 (16.1)	69.6 (20.9)	77.9 (25.5)	81.8 (27.7)	81.1 (27.3)	73.6 (23.1)	62.1 (16.7)	50.5 (10.3)	42.1 (5.6)	61.4 (16.3)
Mean daily minimum °F (°C)	29.7 (−1.3)	33.0 (0.6)	40.8 (4.9)	49.1 (9.5)	59.0 (15.0)	67.6 (19.8)	71.1 (21.7)	69.9 (21.1)	61.7 (16.5)	49.8 (9.9)	39.2 (4.0)	32.0 (0.0)	50.2 (10.1)
Record low °F (°C)	−11 (−24)	−15 (−26)	−7 (−22)	24 (−4)	32 (0)	37 (3)	49 (9)	47 (8)	32 (0)	23 (−5)	10 (−12)	−3 (−19)	−15 (−26)
Average precipitation inches (mm)	3.20 (81)	3.10 (79)	4.37 (111)	4.83 (123)	4.67 (119)	3.35 (85)	3.45 (88)	3.51 (89)	3.02 (77)	4.06 (103)	4.60 (117)	4.25 (108)	46.41 (1,179)
Average precipitation days (≥ 0.01 in)	7.9	9.2	11.5	10.0	12.5	8.7	9.6	8.5	8.1	9.7	8.9	9.1	113.7
Source: NOAA

== Demographics ==
Historical population
Census	Pop.	Note	%±
1870	240		—
1880	514		114.2%
1890	1,321		157.0%
1900	1,832		38.7%
1910	2,936		60.3%
1920	4,505		53.4%
1930	5,628		24.9%
1940	5,927		5.3%
1950	8,166		37.8%
1960	8,921		9.2%
1970	11,750		31.7%
1980	14,518		23.6%
1990	21,260		46.4%
2000	23,682		11.4%
2010	27,920		17.9%
2020	28,940		3.7%
2025 (est.)	29,521	▲	2.0%
U.S. Decennial Census

=== 2020 census ===
As of the 2020 census, Russellville had a population of 28,940, with 10,958 households and 5,858 families residing in the city.

The median age was 30.7 years; 21.6% of residents were under the age of 18 and 14.3% were 65 years of age or older. For every 100 females, there were 94.9 males, and for every 100 females age 18 and over, there were 92.1 males age 18 and over.

93.9% of residents lived in urban areas, while 6.1% lived in rural areas.

Of the 10,958 households, 30.2% had children under the age of 18 living in them. Of all households, 39.6% were married-couple households, 20.7% were households with a male householder and no spouse or partner present, and 31.3% were households with a female householder and no spouse or partner present. About 31.6% of all households were made up of individuals, and 11.7% had someone living alone who was 65 years of age or older.

There were 12,102 housing units, of which 9.5% were vacant. The homeowner vacancy rate was 2.3%, and the rental vacancy rate was 10.3%.

Racial composition as of the 2020 census
Race	Number	Percentage
White	20,906	72.2%
Black or African American	1,818	6.3%
American Indian and Alaska Native	293	1.0%
Asian	490	1.7%
Native Hawaiian and Other Pacific Islander	16	0.1%
Some other race	2,728	9.4%
Two or more races	2,689	9.3%
Hispanic or Latino (of any race)	4,882	16.9%

=== 2010 census ===
As of the 2010 Census, 27,920 people, 10,318 households, and 6,383 families lived in the city. The population density was 987.4 inhabitants per square mile (381.2/km^{2}). The 11,124 housing units had an average density of 393.4 units per square mile (151.9 units/km^{2}). The racial makeup of the city was 83.2% White, 5.5% Black or African American, 0.7% Native American, 1.6% Asian, 6.7% from other races, and 2.3% from two or more races. About 11.7% of the population were Hispanic and Latino Americans of any race.

Of the 10,318 households, 28.9% had children under 18 living with them, 42.3% were married couples living together, 14.4% had a female householder with no husband present, and 38.1% were not families. Around 30.1% of all households were made up of individuals, and 10.5% had someone living alone who was 65 or older. The average household size was 2.39 and the average family size was 2.97.

In the city, the age distribution was 22.6% under 18, 21.4% from 18 to 24, 23.8% from 25 to 44, 19.9% from 45 to 64, and 12.4% who were 65 or older. The median age was 29.1 years. For every 100 females, there were 95.7 males. For every 100 females 18 and over, there were 93.8 males.

The median income for a household in the city was $38,234 and for a family was $49,440. Males had a median income of $30,133 versus $19,906 for females. The per capita income for the city was $19,637. About 14.5% of families and 18.8% of the population were below the poverty line, including 25.8% of those under 18 and 9.1% of those 65 or over.

== Economy ==
Arkansas corporations Tyson Foods, Inc., and Innovation Industries Elevator Signal Fixtures are among the nearly 50 manufacturing plants employing more than 8,300 people. Overall, more than ten divisions of Fortune 500 companies are located in Russellville. A diverse manufacturing base is located in the city. including frozen dinners, railroad crossties, elevator signal fixtures, parking meters, aluminum foil, graphite electrodes, microplanes, and aircraft and automotive parts.

=== Media ===
Russellville's local newspaper is The Courier, which is published six days a week (every day except Monday).

ABOUT the River Valley magazine, a monthly publication distributed across five counties (Pope, Yell, Johnson, Conway, and Logan) of the Arkansas River Valley region, was based in Russellville, with archives available for issues from 2006 to 2021.

TV stations that reach Russellville are either from the Little Rock or Fort Smith/Fayetteville markets, as Russellville is on the "fringe" of both service areas. Russellville receives KFSM-TV (CBS) and KFTA-TV (FOX) from Fort Smith/Fayetteville and KARK-TV (NBC) and KATV-TV (ABC) from Little Rock. The farther one is from the city center, the greater the likelihood that one will receive the full package of channels from one market rather than the other (Fort Smith/Fayetteville to the west and Little Rock to the east of town).

Several commercial radio stations serve the city, including KWKK-FM 100.9, KARV-AM 610 and KWXT-AM 1490, all of which are licensed to Russellville. In addition, radio stations KCJC-FM 102.3 and KCAB-AM 980 (both licensed to Dardanelle, AR); KVLD-FM 99.3 (licensed to Atkins, AR); KARV-FM 101.3 (licensed to Ola, AR) and KYEL-FM 105.5 (licensed to Danville, AR) have their studios in Russellville.

Also, two noncommercial radio stations operate in Russellville: KMTC-FM 91.1 and KXRJ-FM 91.9 (the radio station licensed to Arkansas Tech University).

=== Tourism ===
Russellville is known for its local music, art scene, and historic downtown area events. The most notable of these, on the first Friday night of each quarter (March, June, September, and December), the city hosts the Downtown Art Walk, in which the public may listen to live music, taste wine and food, and appreciate, purchase, and sell art, while connecting with the community, as well as have their picture taken in the Alley.

Russellville hosts a variety of sporting events and fishing tournaments, due to its location on Lake Dardanelle. Russellville is also close to Mt. Nebo and other state parks such as Lake Dardanelle State Park. Also, many people commute to Russellville on a daily basis from its surrounding areas, for both work and recreation.

Balloons over Russellville is a hot-air balloon festival taking place at the Russellville Soccer Complex the first weekend of May annually since 2012. The event features multiple hot-air balloons, helicopter rides, skydiving, live music, vendors, and the Arkansas State Championship Chainsaw Carving Competition.

Russellville is also home to the Pope County Fairgrounds, which hosts many events ranging from horse racing to fairs and conventions. At the end of every summer, Russellville is also host to the annual Pope County Fair, which features rides, live music, livestock, games, and other forms of entertainment. The fair attracts more than 50,000 visitors each year.

== Education ==
Russellville is home to Arkansas Tech University, which was founded in 1909 and as of 2014 had 12,003 students. Russellville is within the Russellville School District, which operates Russellville High School.

== In popular culture ==
In 2013, Russellville was chosen as one of the filming locations for the independent Christian film Cowboys and Jesus. One scene was filmed at Cyclone Stadium, depicting a football game in which locals from the area were invited to attend, appearing as "extras".

Russellville power plant Arkansas Nuclear One was featured in a 2011 episode of Aerial America on the Smithsonian Channel.

== Notable people ==
- Mabel Washbourne Anderson (1863–1949) – writer
- Scott Bradley (1891–1977) – composer, pianist, arranger, and conductor
- Natalie Canerday – actress
- Jeff Davis (1862–1913) – governor of Arkansas and U.S. senator
- Trevor Drown (born 1970) – member of the Arkansas House of Representatives
- Matt Duffield (born 1983) – wrestler and member of the Arkansas House of Representatives
- Jelly Gardner (1895–1977) – baseball player
- Elizabeth Gracen (born 1961) – 1982 Miss America winner
- Brooks Hays (1898–1981) – U.S. representative, president of the Southern Baptist Convention, and Assistant Secretary of State for Legislative Affairs
- Greg Horne (born 1964) – football player
- Gary Johnston (1964–2022) – United States Army major general and commanding general of the United States Army Intelligence and Security Command
- Jim Kincaid (1934–2011) – news correspondent
- Andrea Lea (born 1957) – member of the Arkansas House of Representatives and Arkansas State Auditor
- Jimmy Lile (1933–1991) – bladesmith and president of the Knifemakers' Guild
- Eddie Meador (1937–2023) – football player
- Taelon Peter (born 2002) – basketball player
- Kerry Shook (born 1962) – minister and author
- Greg Standridge (1967–2017) – member of the Arkansas Senate
- Corliss Wiliamson (born 1973) – basketball player and coach
- Steve Womack (born 1957) – U.S. representative

== Gallery ==
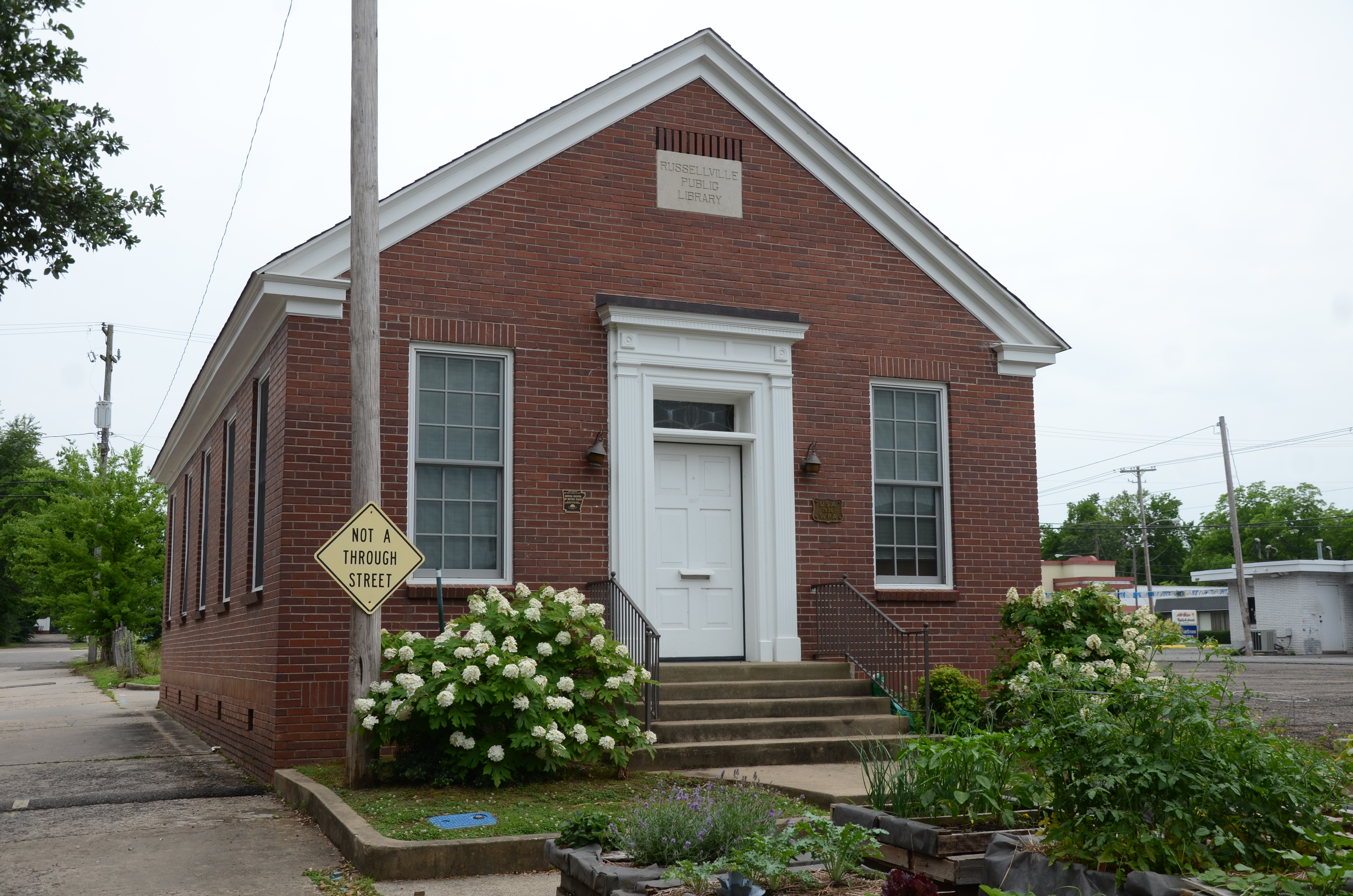
Public Library Annex (Built in 1936-37; image: 30 May 2016 )

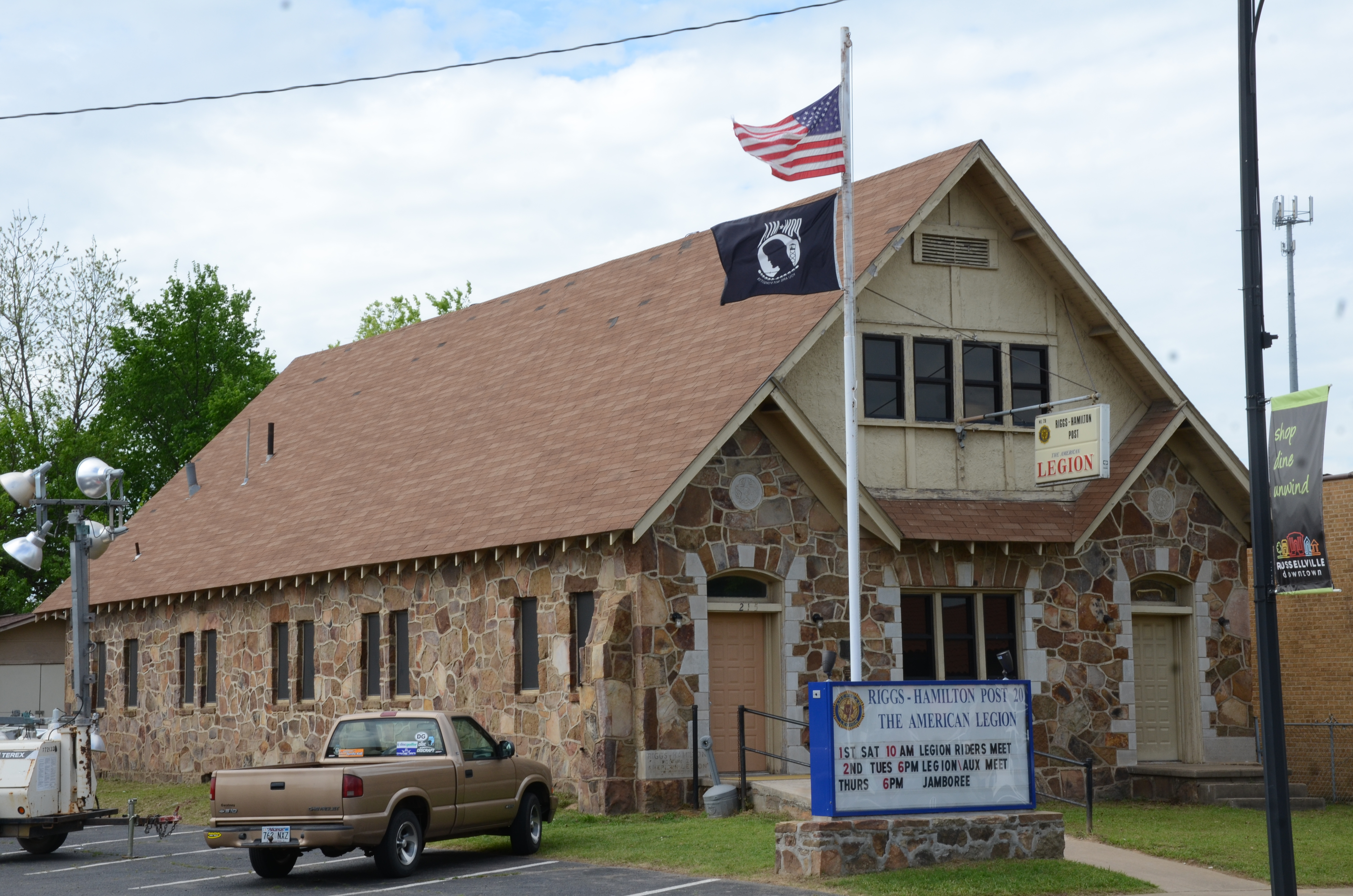
American Legion Hut (Built in 1934; Image: April 18, 2015)

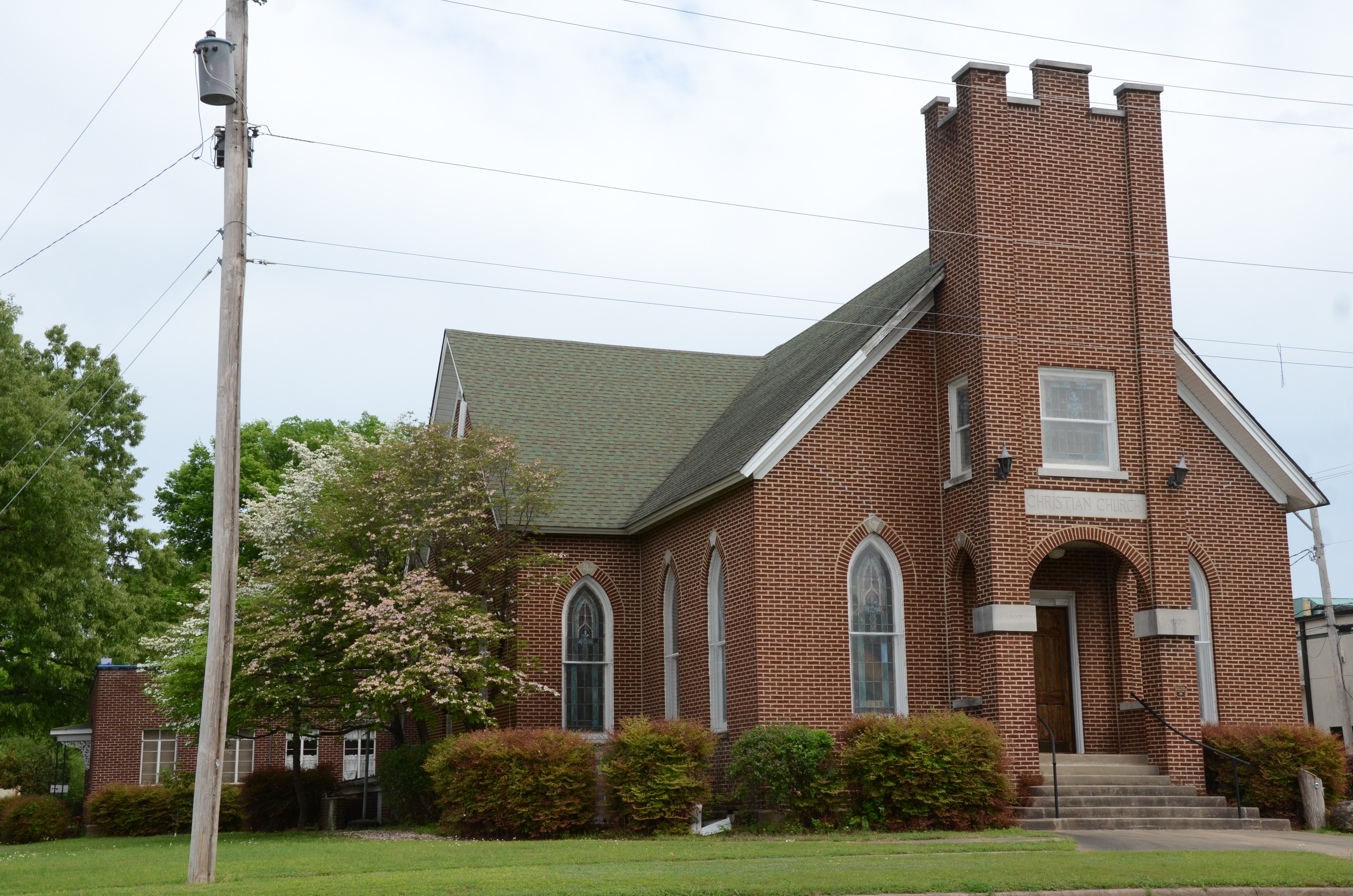
Christian Church (Built in 1885-86; Image: April 18, 2015)

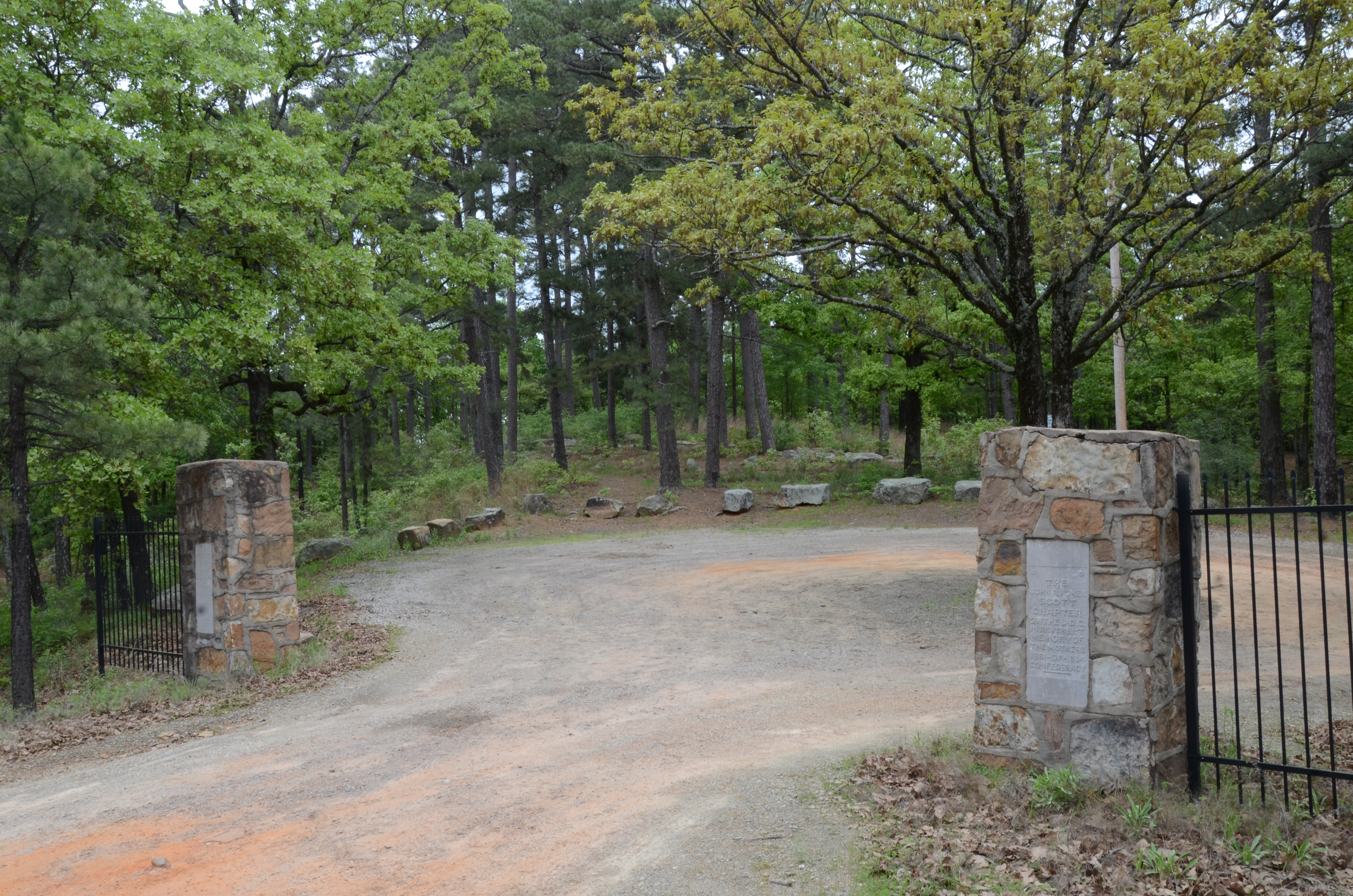
Confederate Mothers Memorial (Donated in 1921; Image: April 18, 2015)

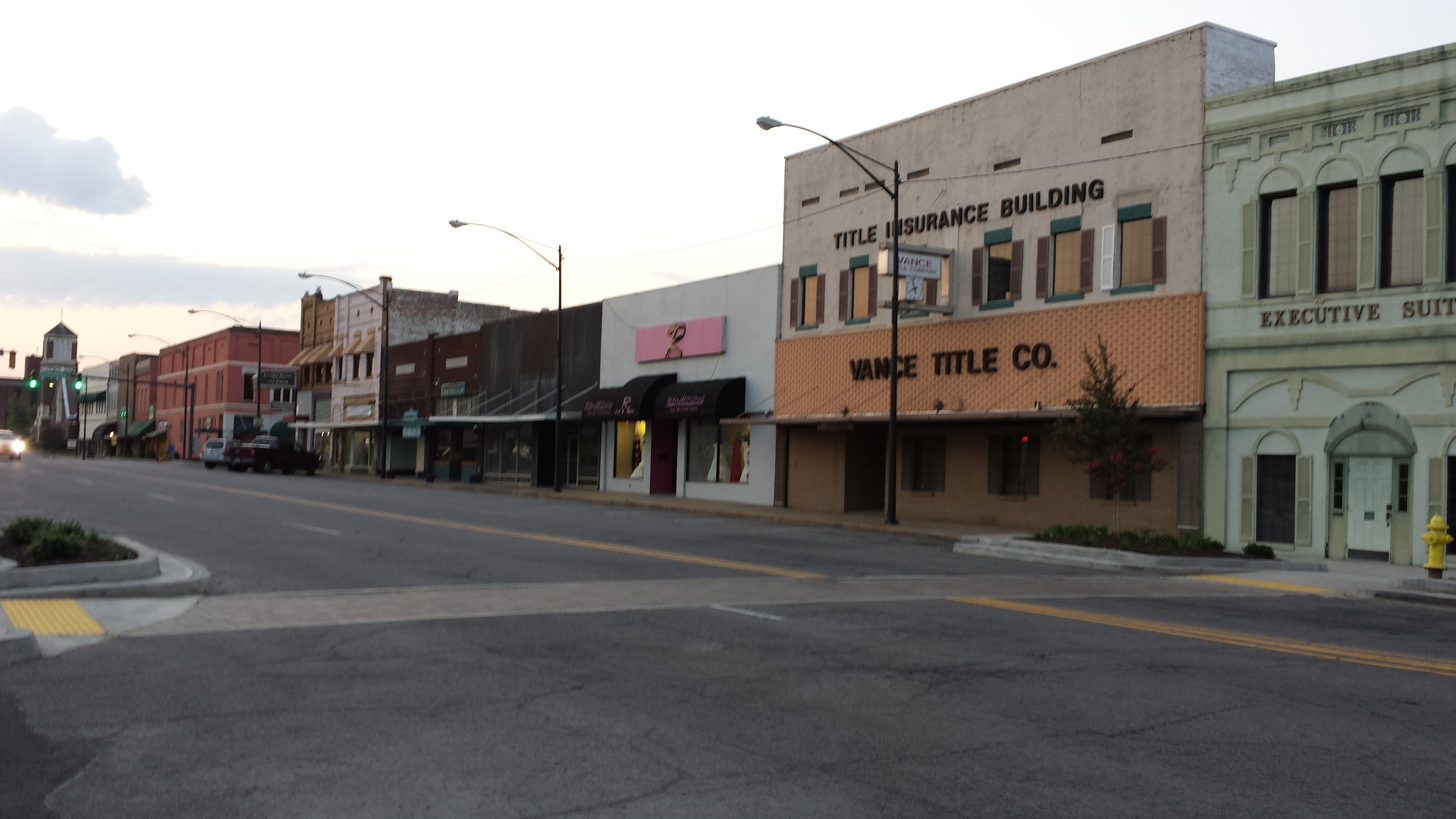
Main Street, August 21, 2013

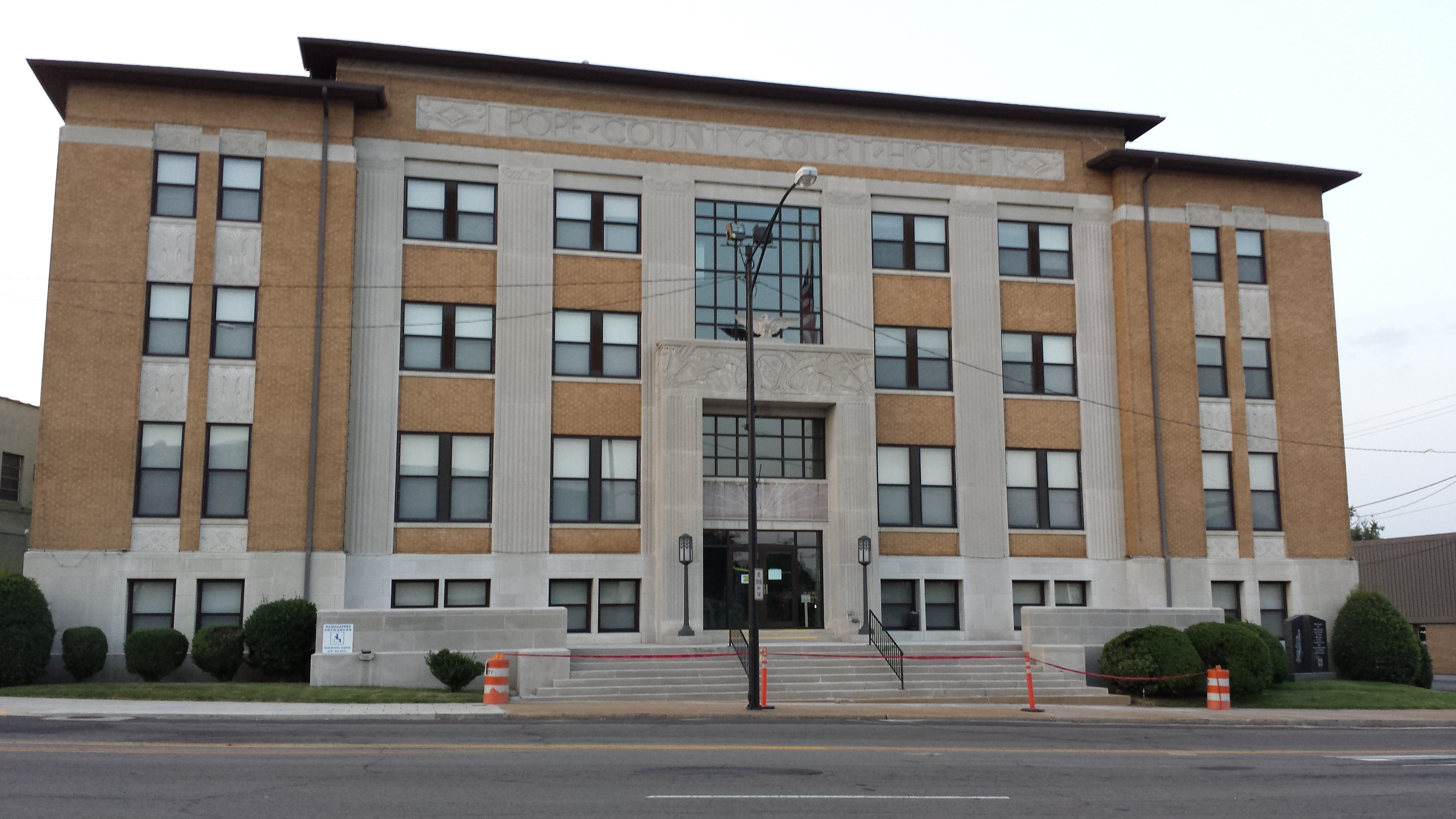
Pope County Courthouse (built 1931), August 21, 2013

== See also ==
- List of cities and towns in Arkansas
- National Register of Historic Places listings in Pope County, Arkansas
