= List of places in Arkansas: G =

Arkansas State Seal

This list of current cities, towns, unincorporated communities, and other recognized places in the U.S. state of Arkansas whose name begins with the letter G. It also includes information on the number and names of counties in which the place lies, and its lower and upper zip code bounds, if applicable.

Name of place	Number of counties	Principal county	Lower zip code	Upper zip code
Gainesboro	1	Independence County	72501	
Gaines Landing	1	Chicot County	71653	
Gainesville	1	Greene County	72443	
Gainsboro	1	Independence County	72501	
Gaither	1	Boone County	72601	
Galena	1	Howard County		
Galet	1	Crittenden County		
Galilee	1	Crittenden County		
Galla Rock	1	Pope County	72823	
Gallatin	1	Benton County	72761	
Galloway	1	Pulaski County	72117	
Gamaliel	1	Baxter County	72537	
Gammon	1	Crittenden County	72364	
Garber	1	Johnson County		
Gardner	1	Union County	71765	
Garfield	1	Benton County	72732	
Garland	1	Miller County	71839	
Garland City	1	Miller County	71839	
Garland Springs	1	Faulkner County	72111	
Garlandville	1	Hempstead County	71857	
Garner	1	White County	72052	
Garnett	1	Lincoln County		
Garrett	1	Johnson County	72846	
Garrett Bridge	1	Lincoln County	71639	
Garrett Grove	1	Lee County	72368	
Garson	1	Mississippi County		
Gassett	1	Lee County	72320	
Gassville	1	Baxter County	72635	
Gaston	1	Montgomery County	71957	
Gateway	1	Benton County	72733	
Gaulett	1	Poinsett County		
Gavin	1	Crittenden County		
Gayler	1	Stone County	72560	
Gaylor	1	Stone County	72560	
Geneva	1	Sevier County	71832	
Genevia	1	Pulaski County	72053	
Genoa	1	Miller County	71840	
Gentry	1	Benton County	72734	
Gentry City	1	Benton County		
George	1	Newton County	72664	
Georges Creek	1	Marion County		
Georgetown	1	Madison County	72773	
Georgetown	1	Pope County	72847	
Georgetown	1	White County	72143	
Gepp	1	Fulton County	72538	
Geridge	1	Lonoke County	72046	
Gernada Chapel	1	Franklin County	72949	
Gertrude	1	Miller County		
Gethsemane	1	Jefferson County	72004	
Geyer Springs	1	Pulaski County		
Gibbons	1	Saline County		
Gibbs	1	Montgomery County	71969	
Gibson	1	Craighead County	72401	
Gibson	1	Pulaski County	72116	
Gid	1	Izard County		
Gieseck	1	Cross County	72331	
Gifford	1	Hot Spring County	72104	
Gilbert	1	Searcy County	72636	
Gilchrist	1	Mississippi County	72358	
Giles (AKA Giles Spur)	1	Lawrence County	72476	
Gilkerson	1	Craighead County		
Gilkey	1	Yell County	72853	
Gill	1	Lee County	72372	
Gillam Park	1	Pulaski County		
Gillett	1	Arkansas County	72055	
Gillham	1	Sevier County	71841	
Gillian Settlement	1	Johnson County		
Gilmore	1	Crittenden County	72339	
Gin City	1	Lafayette County	71826	
Gipson	1	Scott County		
Gladden	1	Cross County	72331	
Glade	1	Benton County		
Gleason	1	Faulkner County	72032	
Glencoe	1	Fulton County	72539	
Glendale	1	Crittenden County		
Glendale	1	Lincoln County	71667	
Glendale	1	Logan County		
Glenlake	1	Jefferson County		
Glen Rose	1	Hot Spring County	72104	
Glenview	1	Pulaski County		
Glenville	1	Nevada County		
Glenwood	2	Pike County	71943	
Glenwood	2	Montgomery County	71943	
Glynn	1	Bradley County		
Gobbler	1	Carroll County	72616	
Gobblers Point	1	Conway County	72080	
Godfrey Log	1	Bradley County		
Gold Creek	1	Faulkner County	72032	
Golden City	1	Logan County	72927	
Golden Lake	1	Mississippi County	72395	
Gold Lake Estates	1	Faulkner County	72032	
Goldman	1	Arkansas County		
Goobertown	1	Craighead County	72417	
Good Hope	1	Ouachita County	71726	
Goodman	1	Saline County		
Goodrich	1	Woodruff County		
Goodwin	1	St. Francis County	72340	
Goodwin Field	1	Union County	71730	
Goose Camp	1	Johnson County	72840	
Gorby	1	Izard County		
Goshen	1	Washington County	72735	
Gosnell	1	Mississippi County	72315	
Gospoda	1	Prairie County		
Gould	1	Lincoln County	71643	
Gourd	1	Lincoln County	71662	
Grady	1	Lincoln County	71644	
Grandfield	1	Pike County		
Grand Glaise	1	Jackson County	72020	
Grand Lake	1	Chicot County	71640	
Grandview	1	Carroll County	72616	
Grandview	1	Conway County		
Grange	1	Sharp County	72521	
Granite Mountain	1	Pulaski County		
Grannis	1	Polk County	71944	
Grants	1	Lafayette County		
Grapevine	1	Grant County	72057	
Graphic	1	Crawford County	72921	
Grassy Lake	1	Crittenden County	72331	
Grassy Lake Bottom	1	Crittenden County		
Gravel Hill	1	Pope County	72837	
Gravel Hill	1	Van Buren County	72030	
Gravel Hill	1	White County	72136	
Gravelly	1	Yell County	72838	
Gravel Pit	1	Ouachita County		
Gravelridge	1	Bradley County	71631	
Gravel Ridge	1	Pulaski County	72076	
Graves Chapel	1	Sevier County	71846	
Gravesville	1	Van Buren County	72039	
Gravette	1	Benton County	72736	
Gray Rock	1	Logan County	72855	
Grays	1	Woodruff County	72101	
Grayson	1	Logan County		
Graysonia	1	Clark County		
Greasy Corner	1	St. Francis County	72346	
Greenbrier	1	Faulkner County	72058	
Greene High	1	Greene County	72450	
Greenfield	1	Poinsett County	72432	
Green Forest	1	Carroll County	72638	
Green Hill	1	Drew County	71675	
Greenland	1	Washington County	72737	
Greenville	1	Bradley County		
Greenway	1	Clay County	72430	
Greenwood	1	Franklin County	72949	
Greenwood	1	Sebastian County	72936	
Greenwood Junction	1	Crawford County		
Greers Ferry	1	Cleburne County	72067	
Gregory	1	Woodruff County	72059	
Grider	1	Mississippi County	72370	
Griffith Spring	1	Lincoln County	71667	
Griffithtown	1	Clark County	71923	
Griffithville	1	White County	72060	
Grubbs	1	Jackson County	72431	
Grubb Springs	1	Boone County		
Guernsey	1	Hempstead County	71801	
Guion	1	Izard County	72540	
Gulledge	1	Ashley County	71646	
Gum Grove	1	Nevada County		
Gum Point	1	Craighead County		
Gum Springs	1	Clark County	71923	
Gum Springs	1	Cleveland County		
Gum Springs	1	Pulaski County		
Gum Tree	1	Yell County		
Gurdon	1	Clark County	71743	
Guy	1	Faulkner County	72061	

== Townships ==
Name of place	Number of counties	Principal county	Lower zip code	Upper zip code
Gainsboro Township	1	Independence County		
Gaither Township	1	Boone County		
Galla Township	1	Pope County		
Galla Rock Township	1	Yell County		
Gap Township	1	Montgomery County		
Gap Springs Township	1	Polk County		
Garden Township	1	Woodruff County		
Garfield Township	1	Benton County		
Garland Township	1	Arkansas County		
Garland Township	1	Benton County		
Garland Township	1	Hempstead County		
Garland Township	1	Miller County		
Garland Township	1	St. Francis County		
Garner Township	1	Union County		
Garner Township	1	White County		
Gentry Township	1	Benton County		
Georgia Township	1	Nevada County		
Gid Township	1	Izard County		
Gifford Township	1	Hot Spring County		
Giles Township	1	Cleburne County		
Gilkerson Township	1	Craighead County		
Gilkey Township	1	Yell County		
Glaize Township	1	Jackson County		
Glass Township	1	Jackson County		
Gleghorn Township	1	Clay County		
Golden Lake Township	1	Mississippi County		
Goodrum Township	1	Lonoke County		
Goodwin Township	1	St. Francis County		
Goshen Township	1	Washington County		
Gould Township	1	Lincoln County		
Grant Township	1	Johnson County		
Grassey Township	1	Cleburne County		
Grassy Township	1	Cleburne County		
Gravel Hill Township	1	White County		
Gravelly Hill Township	1	Yell County		
Gray Township	1	Lonoke County		
Gray Township	1	White County		
Greenbrier Township	1	Independence County		
Greenfield Township	1	Craighead County		
Greenfield Township	1	Monroe County		
Greenfield Township	1	Poinsett County		
Greenland Township	1	Washington County		
Greenwood Township	1	Baxter County		
Greenwood Township	1	Poinsett County		
Gregory Township	1	Conway County		
Griffin Township	1	Conway County		
Griffin Township	1	Pope County		
Griggs Township	1	St. Francis County		
Griggs Township	1	Van Buren County		
Grove Township	1	Newton County		
Grover Township	1	Baxter County		
Grover Township	1	Franklin County		
Grubbs Township	1	Jackson County		
Guion Township	1	Izard County		
Gum Log Township	1	Pope County		
Gum Pond Township	1	Arkansas County		
Gum Springs Township	1	White County		
Gum Woods Township	1	Lonoke County		
Guthrie Township	1	Izard County		
Guthrie Township	1	White County		
