= Galla Creek Township, Pope County, Arkansas =

Galla Creek Township
- Former Township
- Interactive map of Galla Creek Township
- Coordinates: 35°15′01″N 93°02′51″W
- Country: United States
- State: Arkansas
- County: Pope
- Elevation: 358 ft (109 m)
- GNIS feature ID: 70140

Galla Creek Township is a former township of Pope County, Arkansas. It was located in the southern part of the county and contained part of the Holla Bend National Wildlife Refuge.

== Cities, towns, and villages ==
- Holla Bend
- Pottsville
