= Worthen, Arkansas =

- Unincorporated community
- Worthen's position in Arkansas. Worthen, Arkansas (the United States)
- Coordinates: 35°14′37.3″N 93°01′21.6″W
- Country: United States
- State: Arkansas
- County: Pope
- Township: Galla
- Elevation: 390 ft (120 m)
- Time zone: UTC-6 (Central (CST))
  - Summer (DST): UTC-5 (CDT)
- ZIP code: 72858
- Area code: 479
- GNIS feature ID: 81905

Worthen is an unincorporated community in Galla Township, Pope County, Arkansas, United States. It is located on US Route 64 approximately 1.5 miles east of Pottsville.
