= Georgetown, Pope County, Arkansas =

Georgetown, Arkansas
- Unincorporated community
- Georgetown's position in Arkansas. Georgetown, Arkansas (the United States)
- Coordinates: 35°20′00″N 93°16′34″W
- Country: United States
- State: Arkansas
- County: Pope
- Elevation: 377 ft (115 m)
- Time zone: UTC-6 (Central (CST))
  - Summer (DST): UTC-5 (CDT)
- GNIS feature ID: 77007

Georgetown (also known as Mixer) is an unincorporated community in Clark Township, Pope County, Arkansas, United States.
