= Hogan Township, Pope County, Arkansas =

Hogan Township
- Former Township
- Interactive map of Hogan Township
- Coordinates: 35°32′00″N 93°02′56″W
- Country: United States
- State: Arkansas
- County: Pope
- Created: between 1910 and 1920
- Elevation: 679 ft (207 m)
- GNIS feature ID: 70142

Hogan Township was a township of Pope County, Arkansas. It was located in the central part of the county. Hogan Township was created between 1910 and 1920 using parts from Allen, Jackson, Liberty, Martin and North Fork Townships.
