= Hogan Township =

Hogan Township may refer to:

- Hogan Township, Franklin County, Arkansas
- Hogan Township, Pope County, Arkansas
- Hogan Township, Dearborn County, Indiana
