= Bayliss Township, Pope County, Arkansas =

Bayliss Township
- Township
- Location in Arkansas
- Coordinates: 35°24′10″N 93°14′06″W
- Country: United States
- State: Arkansas
- County: Pope
- Established: 1876

Area
  - Total: 28.9 sq mi (75 km^{2})
  - Land: 28.85 sq mi (74.7 km^{2})
  - Water: 0.05 sq mi (0.13 km^{2})
- Elevation: 636 ft (194 m)

Population (2010)
  - Total: 824
  - Density: 28.6/sq mi (11.0/km^{2})
- Time zone: UTC-6 (CST)
  - Summer (DST): UTC-5 (CDT)
- GNIS feature ID: 69697

Bayliss Township is one of nineteen current townships in Pope County, Arkansas, USA. As of the 2010 census, its unincorporated population was 824.

== Geography ==
According to the United States Census Bureau, Bayliss Township covers an area of 28.9 square miles (75 km^{2}), with 28.8 square miles (75 km^{2}) of land and 0.1 square miles (0.26 km^{2}) of water. Bayliss Township was created in 1876 from parts of Clark and Martin Townships.

=== Cities, towns, and villages ===
- Augsburg
