= Ross, Arkansas =

- Unincorporated community
- Position in Arkansas
- Coordinates: 35°27′18″N 93°15′12″W
- Country: United States
- State: Arkansas
- County: Pope
- Elevation: 787 ft (240 m)
- Time zone: UTC-6 (Central (CST))
  - Summer (DST): UTC-5 (CDT)
- GNIS feature ID: 78218

Ross is an unincorporated community in Pope County, Arkansas, United States. It was the principal community in the former Sand Spring Township.
