= Andrew Scott (judge) =

American judge

Honorable Andrew Horatio Scott

Delegate to 1836 Arkansas Constitutional Convention
- In office January 4, 1836 – January 30, 1836
- Constituency: Pope and Johnson Counties

Superior Court of Arkansas Territory
- In office 1819–1825
- Appointed by: President James Monroe

Personal details
- Born: August 6, 1789
- Died: March 15, 1851 (aged 61) Norristown, Arkansas
- Resting place: Oakland Cemetery, Russellville, Arkansas
- Spouse: Eliza Jones
- Children: 5
- Parents: Andrew Scott (father); Elizabeth Ferguson (mother)
- Relatives: John Scott
- Occupation: Superior Court and Circuit Court Judge
- Known for: Judge and murder

Andrew Horatio Scott (August 6, 1789 – March 13, 1851) was an American lawyer and politician who served as a Judge of the Superior Court of the Arkansas Territory, the highest court in the territory, from 1819 until 1825. Scott County, Arkansas was named for him.

== Early life ==
Scott was born in Hanover County, Virginia, to Andrew Scott, a weaver who immigrated from Scotland, and Elisabeth Ferguson. The family moved to Ste. Genevieve, Missouri in 1808. Scott had two brothers and three sisters. He began to learn to read law under his older brother, John. Scott married Eliza Jones on November 5, 1811, at the age of 22. The couple had several children including:

- Captain John Rice Homer Scott (b. 1813, d. 1905)
- Eliza Harriet Scott (b. 1818, d. 1874)
- Augustus Scott (b. 1820)
- Walter Ferguson Scott (b. 1822)
- Henry Clay Scott (b. unknown)

== Political career ==
Scott first became politically active in 1812. Arkansas was then still part of the Missouri Territory, and Scott served two terms as the first clerk of the House of Representatives. He moved his family to Potosi, Missouri, in 1815. While there he established the Potosi Academy and served as trustee with his father-in-law.

In 1819, Territorial Governor William Clark commissioned Scott sheriff of Jefferson County, Missouri; however, on March 3, 1819, President Monroe appointed him as a Superior Court Judge for the newly created Territory of Arkansas. Scott then moved his family to the vicinity of Arkansas Post, the then-capitol of Arkansas Territory. The General Assembly of Arkansas Territory passed a legislative act in October of 1820 to move the territorial capital to Little Rock in Pulaski County, some 90 miles northwest. The Scott family remained in Arkansas Post for a time before following the move of the capitol.

The circuit courts were organized in the Arkansas Territory in 1827, and Scott was appointed to the First District on April 11, 1827. He removed lands formerly owned by Native Americans and planned a new town called Scotia. Scott unsuccessfully sought election to the United States Congress in the 1828 Arkansas Territory's at-large congressional district special election. Pope County was created on November 2, 1829, and Scotia became the first permanent county seat in 1830. Scott was the first county judge.

After serving two terms as an Arkansas territorial judge, he failed to receive senate confirmation for a third. He was also a delegate to the first Arkansas Constitutional Convention of 1836.

== Duels ==
Before moving to Little Rock, Scott challenged fellow Superior Court Judge Joseph Selden to a duel over a perceived slight towards a lady in April of 1824. According to William F. Pope, Judge Selden apologized; however, Selden died at the hands of Scott on the east bank of the Mississippi River near Helena on May 26, 1824. Judge Selden was survived by his pregnant wife and one-year-old daughter. His wife and two daughters moved back to Virginia, where his wife re-married and moved to England.

Scott was later involved in the duel-related death of General Edmund Hogan. In 1827, Hogan ran against Colonel Alexander S. Walker and Judge Scott for a seat on the Territorial Legislative Council. Hogan won the election, but on May 31, 1828, he and Scott were involved in an altercation that resulted in the formers death. Hogan had been an early settler of Little Rock, having built the first home and ferry where the road from Missouri crossed the Arkansas river, and was the first justice of the Peace for Pulaski County.

== Death ==
He died unexpectedly at Norristown, Arkansas. He was originally interred at a cemetery in Dover, but his son, Capt. John R. H. Scott, had him and his wife reinterred at the Oakland Cemetery in Russellville in 1881.
