= North Fork Township =

North Fork Township may refer to:

- North Fork Township, Baxter County, Arkansas, in Baxter County, Arkansas
- North Fork Township, Pope County, Arkansas
- North Fork Township, Gallatin County, Illinois
- North Fork Township, Delaware County, Iowa
- North Fork Township, Stearns County, Minnesota
- North Fork Township, Ashe County, North Carolina, in Ashe County, North Carolina
- North Fork Township, Watauga County, North Carolina, in Watauga County, North Carolina
