= Independence Township, Pope County, Arkansas =

Independence Township
- Former Township
- Interactive map of Independence Township
- Coordinates: 35°36′45″N 92°54′11″W
- Country: United States
- State: Arkansas
- County: Pope
- Elevation: 1,247 ft (380 m)
- GNIS feature ID: 70144

Independence Township is a former township of Pope County, Arkansas. It was located in the northeastern part of the county.

== Cities, towns, and villages ==
- Nogo
