= Pottsville Citizen's Bank =

- U.S. National Register of Historic Places
- U.S. Historic district – Contributing property
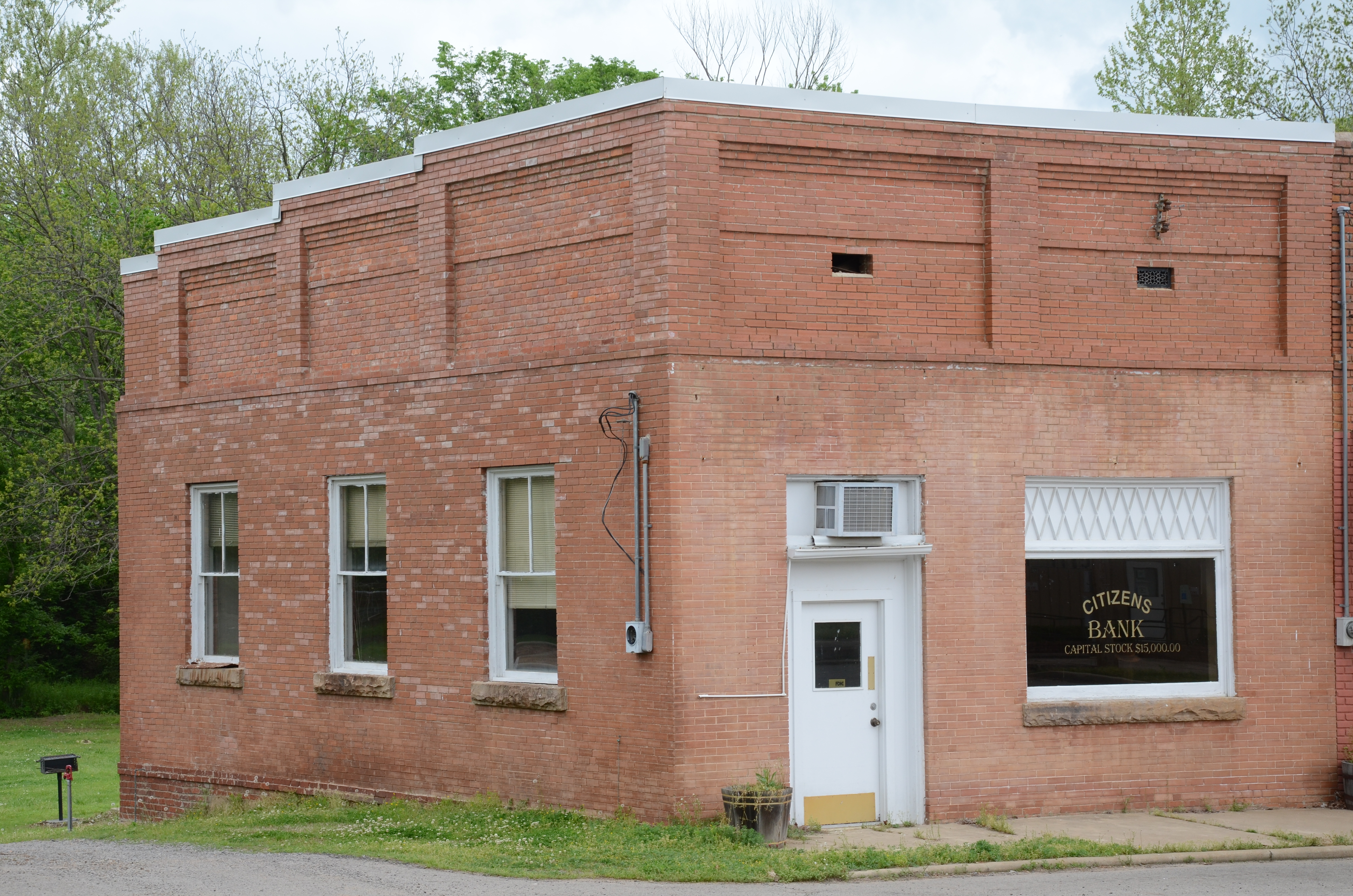

- Location within Arkansas Location within the United States
- Location: 156 E. Ash St., Pottsville, Arkansas
- Coordinates: 35°14′59″N 93°2′45″W
- Area: less than one acre
- Built: 1913
- Architectural style: Early Commercial
- Part of: Pottsville Commercial Historic District (ID04001510)
- NRHP reference No.: 02000261

Significant dates
- Added to NRHP: March 28, 2002
- Designated CP: March 28, 2002

The Pottsville Citizen's Bank is a historic commercial building at 156 East Ash Street in downtown Pottsville, Arkansas. It is a single-story brick building, with vernacular early 20th-century commercial styling, a flat roof (obscured by a parapet) and a concrete foundation. It is joined by a party wall to a similar building on the right. Built in 1913, it housed the first bank to establish business in the community.

The building was listed on the National Register of Historic Places, and is one of four buildings in the Pottsville Commercial Historic District.

== See also ==
- National Register of Historic Places listings in Pope County, Arkansas
