= Allen Township, Pope County, Arkansas =

Allen Township
- Former Township
- Former location in Arkansas
- Coordinates: 35°35′10″N 93°08′21″W
- Country: United States
- State: Arkansas
- County: Pope
- Established: 1856
- Elevation: 1,207 ft (368 m)
- GNIS feature ID: 70138

Allen Township is a former township of Pope County, Arkansas. Part of Allen Township was given to Hogan Township some time between 1910 and 1920.

== Cities, towns, and villages ==
- Treat
