= Wilson Township, Pope County, Arkansas =

Wilson Township
- Township
- Location in Arkansas
- Coordinates: 35°13′30″N 92°55′01″W
- Country: United States
- State: Arkansas
- County: Pope
- Established: 1854

Area
  - Total: 59.35 sq mi (153.7 km^{2})
  - Land: 56.32 sq mi (145.9 km^{2})
  - Water: 3.03 sq mi (7.8 km^{2})
- Elevation: 335 ft (102 m)

Population (2010)
  - Total: 4,774
  - Density: 84.8/sq mi (32.7/km^{2})
- Time zone: UTC-6 (CST)
  - Summer (DST): UTC-5 (CDT)
- Area code: 479
- GNIS feature ID: 69715

Wilson Township is one of nineteen current townships in Pope County, Arkansas, USA. As of the 2010 census, its unincorporated population was 4,774. It now contains the former township of Lee.

== Geography ==
According to the United States Census Bureau, Wilson Township covers an area of 59.35 square miles (153.7 km^{2}), with 56.32 square miles (145.9 km^{2}) of land and 3.03 square miles (7.8 km^{2}) of water.

=== Cities, towns, and villages ===
- Atkins
- Galla Rock
- Wilson
