= Pottsville Commercial Historic District =

Historic district in Arkansas, United States

- U.S. National Register of Historic Places
- U.S. Historic district
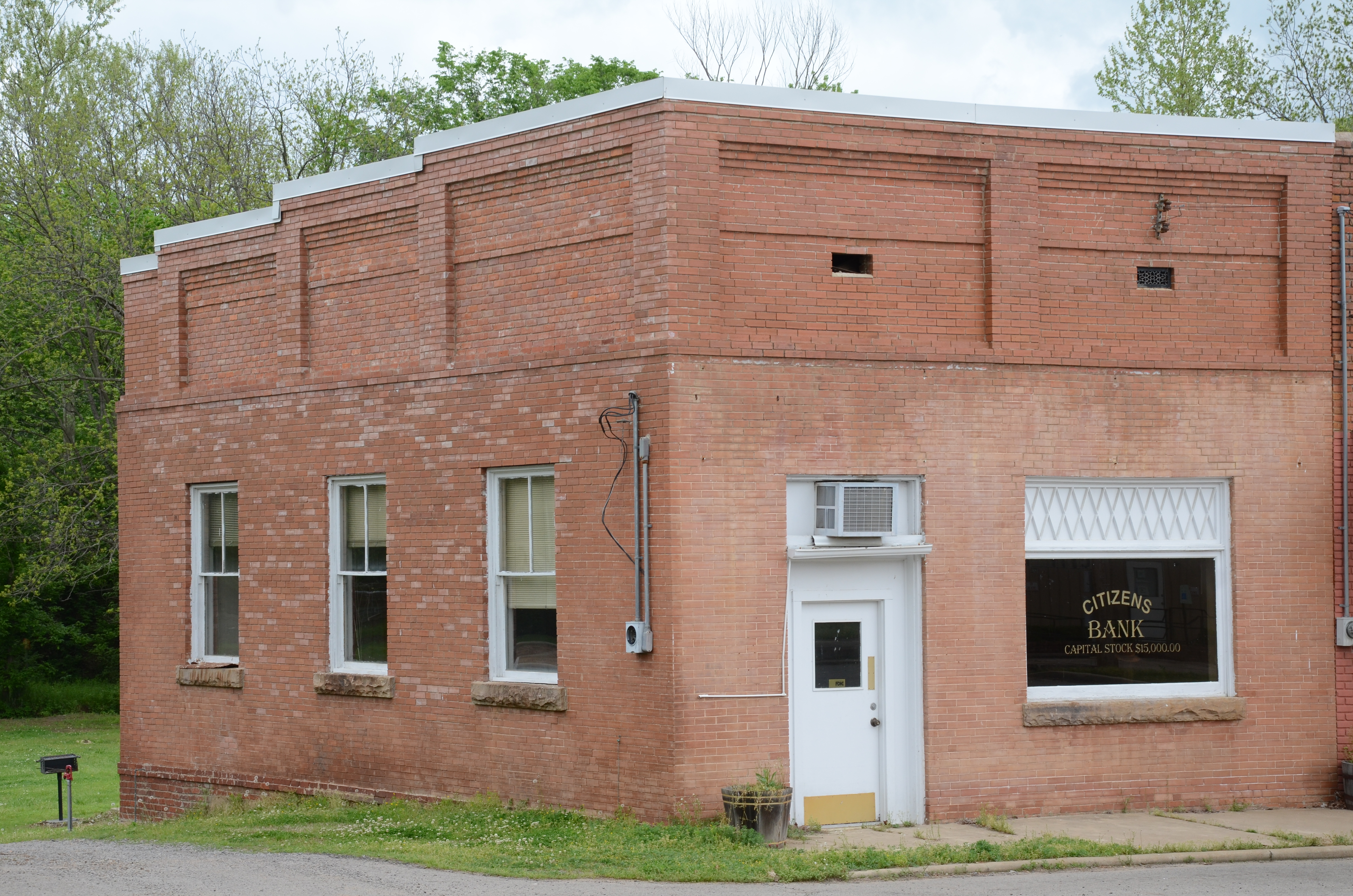
- Pottsville Citizen's Bank

- Location within Arkansas Location within the United States
- Location: 155,160,162 and 164 E. Ash St., Pottsville, Arkansas
- Coordinates: 35°14′59″N 93°2′46″W
- Area: 2 acres (0.81 ha)
- Built: 1887
- Architectural style: Early Commercial
- NRHP reference No.: 04001510
- Added to NRHP: January 20, 2005

The Pottsville Commercial Historic District is a small collection of early 20th-century commercial buildings located on East Ash Street in Pottsville, Arkansas. The district features the former Falls and Sinclair store, built in 1887, along with a row of three interconnected brick buildings: the Pottsville Citizen's Bank (1913), and the Shue and Pryor stores, both built in the 1920s.

Historically, Pottsville has historically served as a commercial supply and business district for the surrounding agricultural areas. In recognition of its historical significance, the district was listed on the National Register of Historic Places in 2005.

== See also ==
- Pottsville Dipping Vat, located in a nearby park
- Potts Inn, located adjacent to this district
- National Register of Historic Places listings in Pope County, Arkansas
