= Lee Township, Arkansas =

Lee Township, Arkansas may refer to:

- Lee Township, Boone County, Arkansas
- Lee Township, Cleveland County, Arkansas
- Lee Township, Johnson County, Arkansas
- Lee Township, Pope County, Arkansas

== See also ==
- List of townships in Arkansas
- Lee Township (disambiguation)
