= Arkansas Nuclear One =

Nuclear power plant located in Russellvile, Pope County, Arkansas

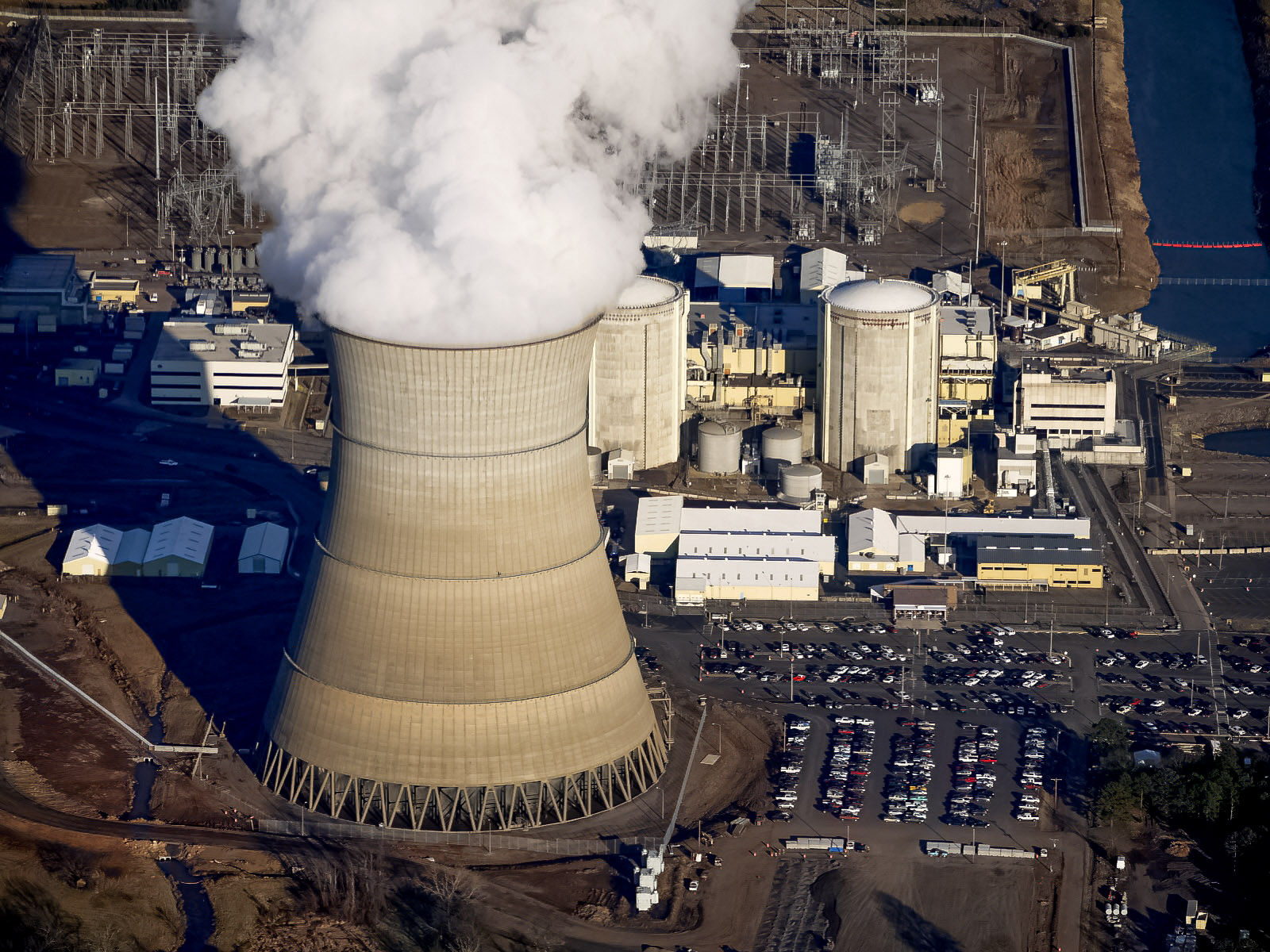
- Arkansas Nuclear One (February 2010)
- Country: United States
- Location: Clark Township, Pope County, near Russellville, Arkansas
- Coordinates: 35.311°N 93.231°W
- Status: Operational
- Construction began: Unit 1: October 1, 1968; Unit 2: December 6, 1968
- Commission date: Unit 1: December 19, 1974; Unit 2: March 26, 1980
- Construction cost: $2.522 billion (2007 USD)
- Owner: Entergy Arkansas
- Operator: Entergy Nuclear

Nuclear power station
- Reactor type: PWR
- Reactor supplier: Unit 1: Babcock & Wilcox; Unit 2: Combustion Engineering
- Cooling towers: 1 × Natural Draft (Unit 2 only)
- Cooling source: Lake Dardanelle
- Thermal capacity: 1 × 2568 MW_{th} 1 × 3026 MW_{th}

Power generation
- Units operational: 1 × 836 MW; 1 × 988 MW
- Make and model: Unit 1: B&W LLP (DRYAMB); Unit 2: CE 2-loop (DRYAMB)
- Nameplate capacity: 1824 MW
- Capacity factor: 79.36% (2017); 80.75% (lifetime)
- Annual net output: 13,555 GWh (2021)

External links
- Website: Arkansas Nuclear One
- Commons: Related media on Commons

Arkansas Nuclear One (ANO) is a two-unit pressurized water nuclear power plant located on Lake Dardanelle outside Russellville, Arkansas. It is owned by Entergy Arkansas and operated by Entergy Nuclear. It is the only nuclear power facility in Arkansas. ANO has been in continuous operation for 50 years as of December 17, 2024.

== Units ==
Both units were designed by Bechtel Power and are located on the Northeast Shore of Lake Dardanelle. They employ a combined number of 950 personnel at ANO and generate enough power to meet approximately 56% of the total energy demand of Entergy Arkansas’ 700,000 customers.

=== Unit One ===
Unit One has a generating capacity of 836 megawatts and began commercial operation on December 19, 1974. ANO Unit 1 had its license to operate issued May 21, 1974 and it was later renewed June 20, 2001. It is licensed to operate through May 20, 2034. Its nuclear reactor and turbine generator were supplied by Babcock & Wilcox and Westinghouse, respectively. Unit One utilizes Lake Dardanelle as its source of cooling.

=== Unit Two ===
Unit Two has a generating capacity of 988 megawatts and began commercial operation on March 26, 1980. ANO Unit 2 had its license to operate issued September 1, 1978 and it was later renewed June 30, 2005. It is licensed to operate through July 17, 2038. Its nuclear reactor and turbine generator were supplied by Combustion Engineering and General Electric, respectively. Unit Two utilizes a recirculating-water system from a 447-foot tall cooling tower.

== Surrounding population ==
The Nuclear Regulatory Commission (NRC) defines two emergency planning zones around nuclear power plants: a plume exposure pathway zone with a radius of 10 miles (16 km), concerned primarily with exposure to, and inhalation of, airborne radioactive contamination, and an ingestion pathway zone of about 50 miles (80 km), concerned primarily with ingestion of food and liquid contaminated by radioactivity.

The 2010 U.S. population within 10 miles (16 km) of Arkansas Nuclear One was 44,139, an increase of 17.2 percent in a decade, according to an analysis of U.S. Census data for msnbc.com. The 2010 U.S. population within 50 miles (80 km) was 308,219, an increase of 13.3 percent since 2000. Cities within 50 miles include Russellville (6 miles to city center).

== Seismic risk ==
The Nuclear Regulatory Commission's estimate of the risk each year of an earthquake intense enough to cause core damage to the reactor at Arkansas Nuclear One was 1 in 243,902, according to an NRC study published in August 2010.

== Safety incidents ==
=== March 2013 incident ===
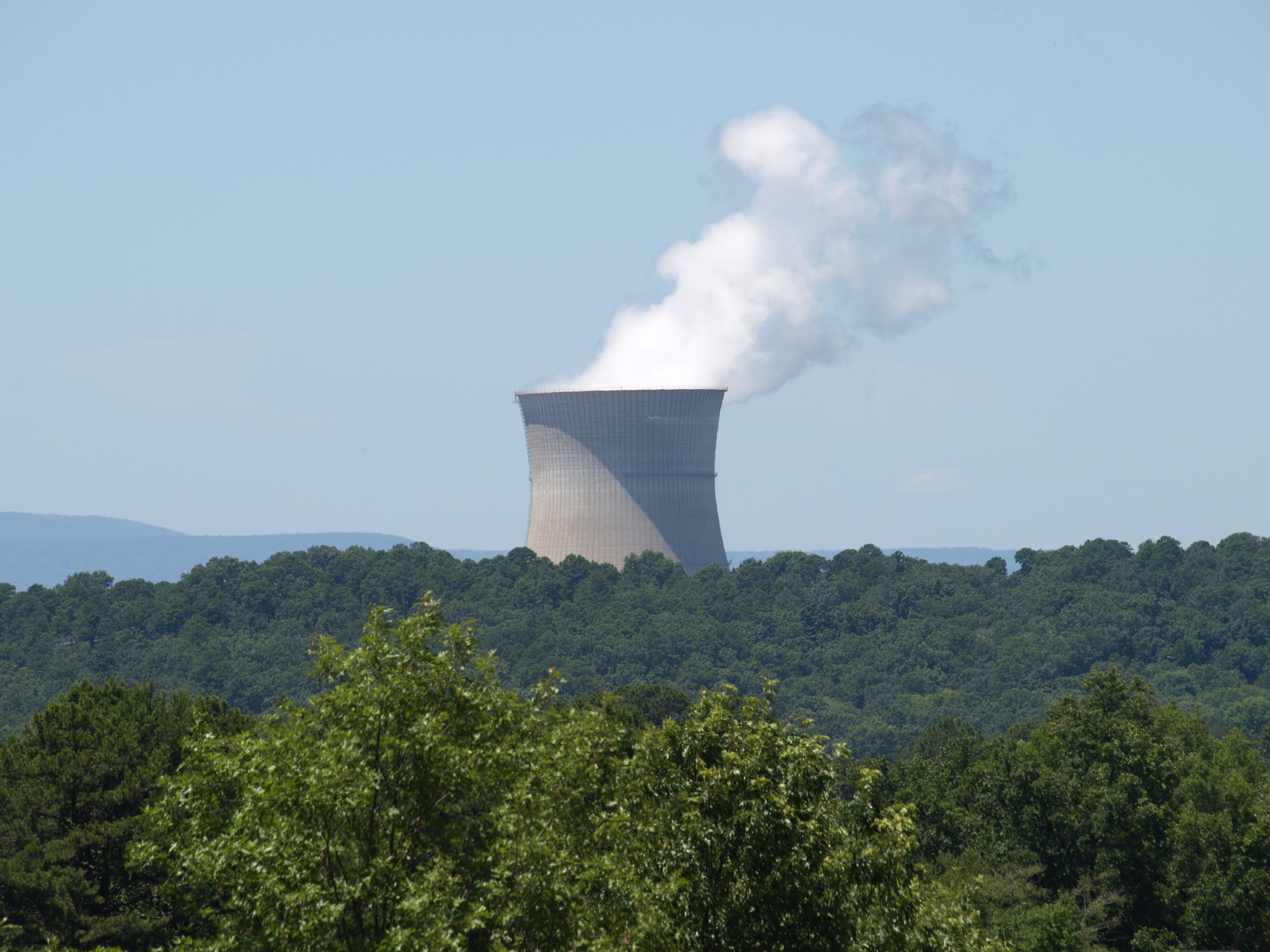
Cooling tower

On March 31, 2013, an industrial accident at the facility killed one person and injured eight other workers, of which four were seriously injured. The accident took place "in a non-radiation area, and there was no risk to public health and safety." According to Entergy, the old stator of Unit One's generator fell during an operation to replace it. The falling component ruptured a water pipe, causing water infiltration into the plant's switchgear, which knocked out power to all of Unit One and one train of Unit Two's electrical system, which was online at the time. The electrical failure caused an automatic shutdown of Unit Two. The plant's emergency generators started and restored power to the emergency systems of both units. Unit One was in a refueling outage. Emergency diesel generators, water pumps and feed water were functioning following a loss of all off-site power on Unit One, according to the NRC event notification. The plant was placed under an "unusual event classification", which is the lowest of four emergency classification levels for abnormal events designated by the federal Nuclear Regulatory Commission, which regulates American civil nuclear installations. One plant worker died, and ten other injuries required offsite medical treatment. The company released an official statement of condolence. Entergy announced that they would immediately commence repairs to Unit Two and hope to have the unit back online within several weeks. Entergy also acknowledged that Unit One would be offline for an extended time while the company surveyed the damage and established a timeline for repairs.

The cost of the repairs was estimated at $95–120M, not counting additional costs to replace lost electricity from the reactors being down for four months. Both units were repaired, and started up on August 7, 2013, capable of returning to full power. During the recovery from the incident a specialist engineering company named Lowther-Rolton assisted with the recovery of the existing Stator and performed a "Technical Audit" (also called a "third-party review") of the engineering for lifting and installation of the new stator to ensure safety of operations.

=== December 2013 incident ===
On December 9, 2013, Unit Two was taken offline due to a transformer fire in the site switchyard. The fire was contained without injuries or threats to safety.

=== Reactor vessel closure head ===
In December 2016, it was disclosed that a certificate of conformity for Unit 2's steel reactor vessel closure head (RVCH), supplied by Creusot Forge, had been forged by the manufacturer, violating safety standards and potentially undermining the vessel head's mechanical ability to withstand sudden breakdown in certain conditions if excess carbon is present inside the steel. Per report ML18017A441 (February 22, 2018), the NRC Staff has determined issues related to the RVCH is negligible and warrants no immediate action. Regardless, the RVCH continues to undergo continuous monitoring and evaluation, as already required by the NRC. The ANO Unit 2 RVCH is scheduled to be replaced 2025-2026 timeframe.

== Electricity production ==
Generation (MWh) of Arkansas Nuclear One
Year	Jan	Feb	Mar	Apr	May	Jun	Jul	Aug	Sep	Oct	Nov	Dec	Annual (Total)
2001	1,028,544	1,214,538	1,030,901	1,109,159	1,321,506	1,285,171	1,268,434	1,318,324	1,286,283	1,333,381	1,243,740	1,340,808	14,780,789
2002	1,334,355	1,209,239	1,340,682	874,937	1,223,077	1,334,145	1,366,828	1,369,798	1,264,140	806,874	1,081,735	1,353,074	14,558,884
2003	1,392,464	1,255,772	1,390,876	1,340,183	1,370,443	1,333,879	1,333,266	1,232,981	970,683	1,026,829	1,008,188	1,033,852	14,689,416
2004	1,395,055	1,217,141	1,393,030	1,130,194	1,095,428	1,158,530	1,374,523	1,347,985	1,262,403	1,340,639	1,347,577	1,387,346	15,449,851
2005	1,394,772	1,259,865	832,029	1,049,398	1,385,659	1,329,546	1,365,357	1,364,550	1,315,097	826,104	724,688	842,506	13,689,571
2006	1,385,978	1,260,384	1,393,467	1,336,107	1,383,699	1,331,337	1,369,027	1,364,180	1,043,262	650,678	1,320,087	1,394,371	15,232,577
2007	1,237,445	1,224,840	1,381,539	1,142,613	979,493	1,330,868	1,372,259	1,363,174	1,328,057	1,383,098	1,348,837	1,393,879	15,486,102
2008	1,392,764	950,562	1,008,754	1,052,889	1,359,120	1,330,655	1,334,646	1,369,191	1,335,231	1,264,610	725,939	1,043,730	14,168,091
2009	1,299,968	1,061,366	1,263,194	1,327,697	1,384,658	1,324,270	1,367,745	1,367,043	722,353	1,386,355	1,348,054	1,317,263	15,169,966
2010	1,390,277	1,195,655	1,164,159	763,131	1,334,143	1,319,429	1,360,698	1,140,888	1,241,627	1,381,429	1,343,025	1,388,217	15,022,678
2011	1,388,972	1,042,029	744,129	1,211,272	1,170,352	1,324,499	1,360,016	1,363,510	1,326,879	1,015,457	876,492	1,370,838	14,194,445
2012	1,368,457	1,298,712	1,380,613	1,331,220	1,371,675	1,321,157	1,356,813	1,314,553	890,220	1,128,270	1,342,763	1,388,678	15,493,131
2013	1,388,982	1,255,342	1,148,164	25,775	743,235	713,416	735,251	1,108,587	1,295,723	1,351,312	1,342,172	837,298	11,945,257
2014	1,125,915	1,254,400	1,386,611	1,159,812	440,492	994,361	1,365,971	1,359,799	1,321,119	1,376,162	1,339,659	1,353,958	14,478,259
2015	1,209,164	669,295	1,346,468	1,325,116	1,371,776	1,317,354	1,343,777	1,329,421	1,041,409	626,728	949,411	1,307,875	13,837,794
2016	1,386,411	1,104,525	1,314,744	1,326,812	1,347,755	1,314,652	1,353,779	1,359,698	1,076,184	78,277	708,685	1,049,500	13,421,022
2017	1,279,925	1,192,231	951,634	517,508	215,385	603,705	1,136,533	1,364,011	1,324,909	1,378,210	1,339,682	1,387,346	12,691,079
2018	1,374,056	1,251,706	1,214,195	722,323	841,725	1,025,537	1,289,468	1,315,837	952,746	632,419	811,046	1,289,760	12,720,818
2019	1,389,566	1,243,888	1,364,841	1,332,697	1,200,079	596,530	660,202	1,352,797	1,309,963	826,357	910,614	1,387,413	13,574,947
2020	1,385,498	1,298,300	942,612	791,161	1,362,478	1,289,240	1,357,755	1,362,357	1,324,716	1,381,546	1,263,157	1,304,229	15,063,049
2021	1,369,932	1,207,132	1,278,617	879,267	1,180,383	1,321,283	1,360,876	1,336,743	1,054,545	632,672	602,702	1,331,532	13,555,684
2022	1,389,063	1,254,475	1,386,441	1,333,483	1,376,758	1,317,518	1,355,146	1,359,939	1,229,466	841,006	721,750	758,652	14,323,697
2023	1,364,106	1,202,680	1,364,559	888,097	815,421	1,290,517	1,340,934	1,355,785	1,287,772	1,380,398	1,342,808	1,339,404	14,972,481
2024	1,389,059	1,295,732	1,388,015	1,253,382	922,797	1,319,886	1,358,746	1,359,413	1,183,514	680,224	1,337,228	1,274,783	14,762,779
2025	1,388,464	1,226,081	1,328,677	1,336,364	1,373,835	1,312,467	1,345,637	1,352,509	1,200,739	878,805	1,040,567	1,408,905	15,193,050
2026	1,408,132	1,251,496	917,826	633,137	1,363,125	1,274,062	1,353,745	1,357,924					--

== See also ==
- List of power stations in Arkansas
- Energy in the United States
  - Renewable energy in the United States
