= Norristown, Arkansas =

- 19th century river settlement and, later, neighborhood in Russellville
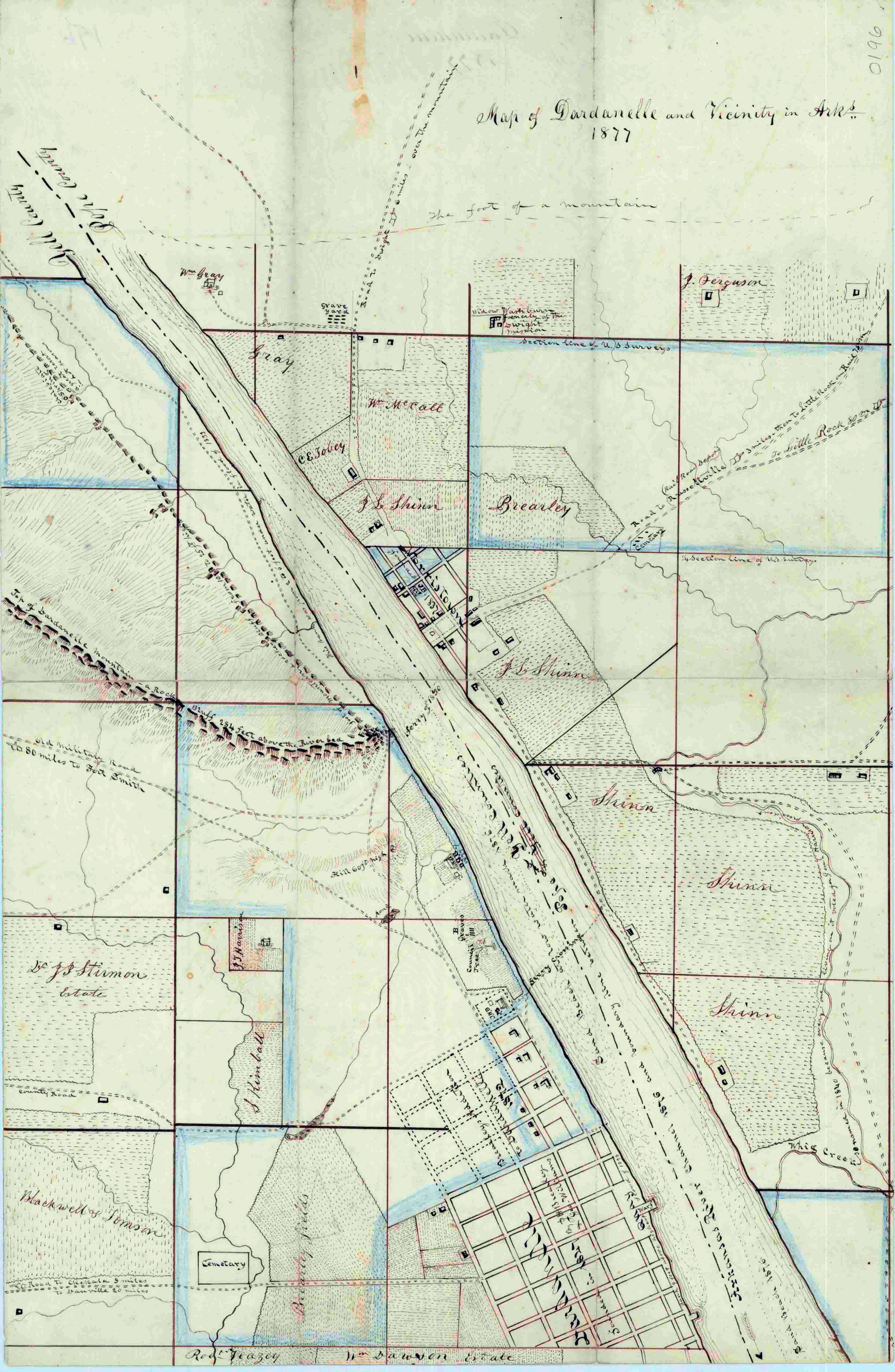
- 1877 map shows Dardanelle and Norristown on the Arkansas River as well as roads, properties, and geographic features.

- Norristown's position in Arkansas. Norristown, Arkansas (the United States)
- Coordinates: 35°16′30″N 93°10′01″W
- Country: United States
- State: Arkansas
- County: Pope
- Elevation: 548 ft (167 m)
- Time zone: UTC-6 (Central (CST))
  - Summer (DST): UTC-5 (CDT)
- 79314: GNIS feature ID

Norristown was the name of two Arkansas communities in Pope County, Arkansas, United States. The first was a 19th-century town and trading center on the Arkansas River. In the last part of the twentieth century, a neighborhood called Norristown was developed below and east of nearby Norristown Mountain, eventually becoming an incorporated town in Illinois Township. The town merged with Russellville in 1980.

== History ==
Founded in 1829, the settlement of Norristown was located south of today's Russellville, on the Arkansas River, upstream and across the river from Dardanelle. Samuel and Susan H. Norris, originally from New Jersey, having settled at Dwight Mission on the Illinois Bayou, subsequently moved to a point on the Arkansas River opposite Dardanelle Rock, giving the place the name of Norristown. The settlement steadily grew over the years until about 300 or 400 people inhabited the area. By 1834, it was a small community that served as the county seat of Pope County until the seat was moved to Dover in 1841 after Yell County was created out of Pope County and Norristown was no longer centrally located in the county. On the bank of the seasonally navigable Arkansas River and on an established mail post road, the town served as a regional trade and shipping center; its main tavern was an important stop between Little Rock and Fort Smith. Thousands of bales of cotton were loaded on steamboats at Norristown to transport to Little Rock and New Orleans. During the Civil War, heavy equipment for mining and processing niter from a mine in Newton County came by river to Norristown.

The town was laid out in what looked like a capital T. Its two streets were unmarked, but residents called them "River Street" and "Main Street". Its post office, established in 1839 with Samual Norris as postmaster, closed in 1882.

During the 1830s and 40s removal period of eastern Native Americans to the Indian Territory, thousands passed through Norristown, many crossing the river on the ferry located there.

In 1855, Cephas Washburn, founder of Dwight Presbyterian Mission on Illinois Bayou west of present-day Russellville, moved to Norristown where he worked as a minister and was instrumental in the establishment of Presbyterian churches at Dardanelle and Galley (Galla) Rock.

Norristown was active throughout the mid-1800s, but by the end of the century, little remained. With the erratic nature of the Arkansas River and the construction of the Little Rock and Fort Smith Railroad through nearby Russellville, riverboat shipping declined and disappeared as did small riverside shipping and market centers like Norristown. Part of the town caved into the river in an 1898 flood while the rest was converted into farmland. The Norristown Cemetery, utilized from 1852 to 1934 and listed in the National Register of Historic Places, is the town's last remnant.

The site of the original settlement of Norristown is now the location of Old Post Road Park, a US Corps of Engineers recreational area. The park's name is derived from the first postal route in this part of Arkansas, which ran through Norristown. An 1830 ferry crossed the river from the present-day location of the park's boat ramp.

In the 20th century, an unincorporated community, also called Norristown, developed on and around Norristown Mountain, a 4.5-mile-long ridge between Russellville and the Arkansas River. Subsequently, incorporated as the town of Norristown, it was consolidated into Russellville after an annexation vote in the general election on November 4, 1980, by a vote of 4,381 to 1,572.

== Gallery ==
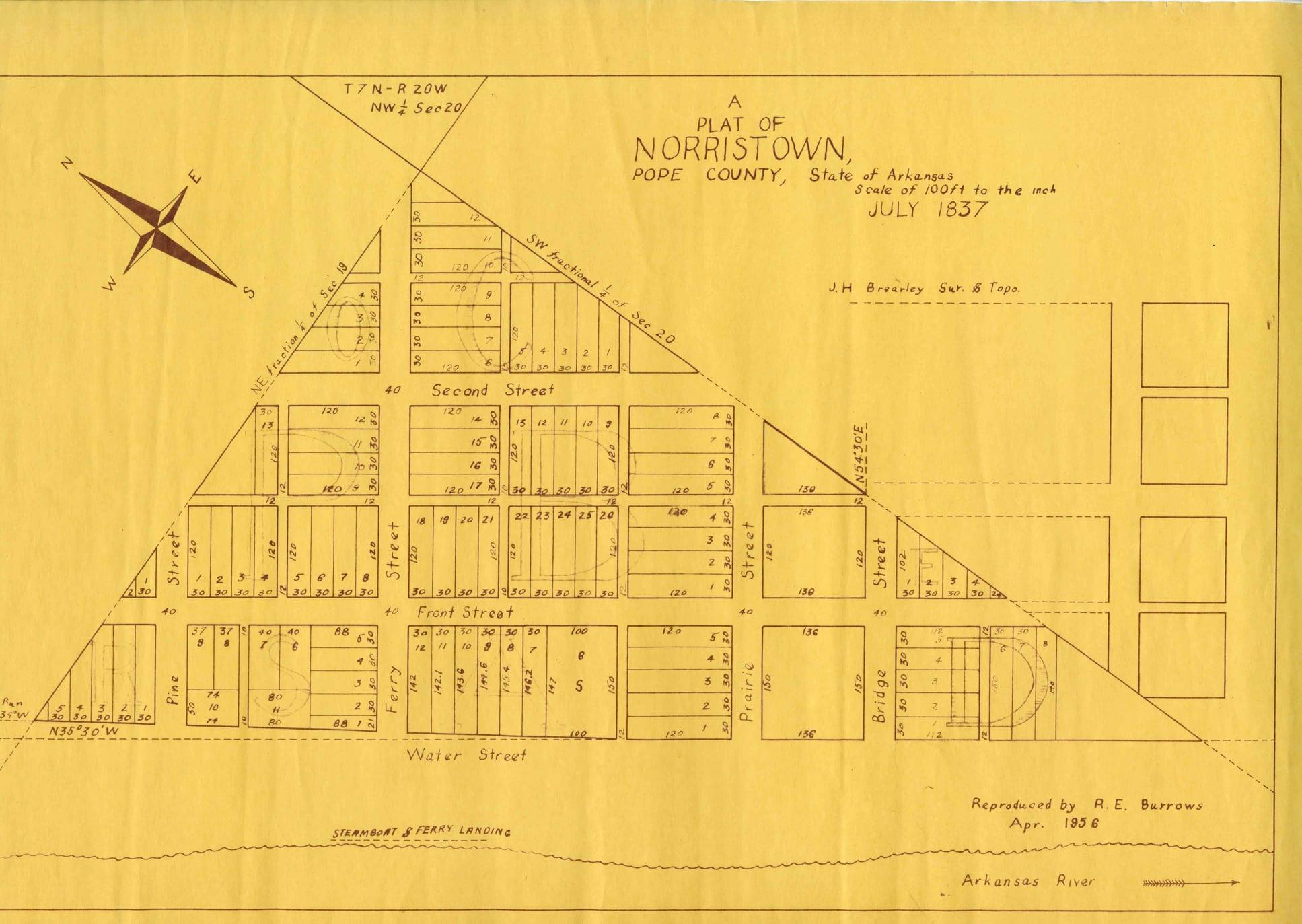
A Plat of Norristown, Pope County, State of Arkansas, July 1837.

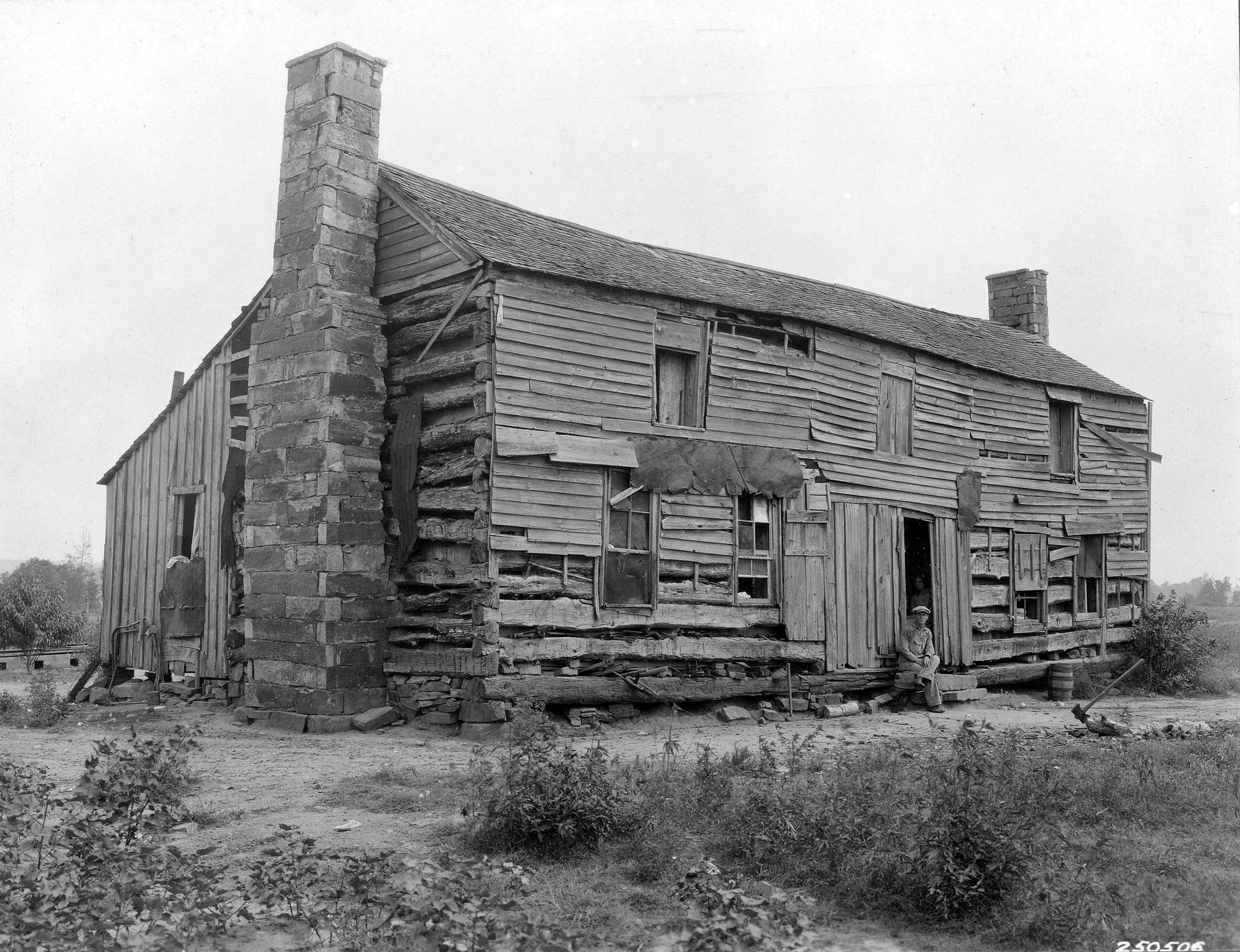
Old log home of Cephas Washburn at Norristown, still in use in 1930, when this photo was taken.
