= Gum Log Township, Pope County, Arkansas =

Gum Log Township
- Township
- Location in Arkansas
- Coordinates: 35°16′30″N 92°59′51″W
- Country: United States
- State: Arkansas
- County: Pope
- Established: 1838

Area
  - Total: 19.86 sq mi (51.4 km^{2})
  - Land: 19.85 sq mi (51.4 km^{2})
  - Water: 0.01 sq mi (0.026 km^{2})
- Elevation: 768 ft (234 m)

Population (2010)
  - Total: 1,717
  - Density: 86.5/sq mi (33.4/km^{2})
- Time zone: UTC-6 (CST)
  - Summer (DST): UTC-5 (CDT)
- Area code: 479
- GNIS feature ID: 69706

Gum Log Township is one of nineteen current townships in Pope County, Arkansas, USA. As of the 2010 census, its unincorporated population was 1,717.

== Geography ==
According to the United States Census Bureau, Gum Log Township covers an area of 19.86 square miles (51.4 km^{2}) with 19.85 square miles (51.4 km^{2}) of it land and 0.01 square miles (0.026 km^{2}) of water. Gum Log Township gave part of its area to Valley Township in 1879.
