= Wilson, Pope County, Arkansas =

Wilson, Arkansas
- Unincorporated community
- Wilson's position in Arkansas. Wilson, Arkansas (the United States)
- Coordinates: 35°12′37″N 92°55′47″W
- Country: United States
- State: Arkansas
- County: Pope
- Township: Wilson
- Elevation: 315 ft (96 m)
- Time zone: UTC-6 (Central (CST))
  - Summer (DST): UTC-5 (CDT)
- GNIS feature ID: 58898

Wilson is an unincorporated community in Wilson Township of southern Pope County, Arkansas, United States. The community is on Arkansas Route 105 approximately two miles south of Atkins.
