= Phoenix Township, Pope County, Arkansas =

Phoenix Township
- Township
- Location in Arkansas
- Coordinates: 35°24′30″N 93°00′31″W
- Country: United States
- State: Arkansas
- County: Pope

Area
  - Total: 12.52 sq mi (32.4 km^{2})
  - Land: 12.52 sq mi (32.4 km^{2})
  - Water: 0.0 sq mi (0 km^{2})
- Elevation: 1,093 ft (333 m)

Population (2010)
  - Total: 313
  - Density: 25/sq mi (9.7/km^{2})
- Time zone: UTC-6 (CST)
  - Summer (DST): UTC-5 (CDT)
- GNIS feature ID: 69712

Phoenix Township is one of nineteen current townships in Pope County, Arkansas, USA. As of the 2010 census, its unincorporated population was 313.

== Geography ==
According to the United States Census Bureau, Phoenix Township covers an area of 12.52 square miles (32.4 km^{2}), all of it land.
