= Holla Bend Township, Pope County, Arkansas =

Holla Bend Township
- Former Township
- Interactive map of Holla Bend Township
- Coordinates: 35°11′30″N 93°04′46″W
- Country: United States
- State: Arkansas
- County: Pope
- Created: 1876
- Elevation: 331 ft (101 m)
- GNIS feature ID: 70143

Holla Bend Township was a township of Pope County, Arkansas. It was created from parts of Galla Rock and Illinois Township.
