= Holla Bend, Arkansas =

- Unincorporated community
- Holla Bend's position in Arkansas. Holla Bend, Arkansas (the United States)
- Coordinates: 35°09′58″N 93°03′07″W
- Country: United States
- State: Arkansas
- County: Pope
- Elevation: 364 ft (111 m)
- Time zone: UTC-6 (Central (CST))
  - Summer (DST): UTC-5 (CDT)
- GNIS feature ID: 57060

Holla Bend is an unincorporated community in Pope County, Arkansas, United States.
