= Smyrna Township, Pope County, Arkansas =

Smyrna Township
- Township
- Location in Arkansas
- Coordinates: 35°38′10″N 92°53′46″W
- Country: United States
- State: Arkansas
- County: Pope

Area
  - Total: 70.72 sq mi (183.2 km^{2})
  - Land: 70.71 sq mi (183.1 km^{2})
  - Water: 0.01 sq mi (0.026 km^{2})
- Elevation: 1,601 ft (488 m)

Population (2010)
  - Total: 187
  - Density: 2.6/sq mi (1.0/km^{2})
- Time zone: UTC-6 (CST)
  - Summer (DST): UTC-5 (CDT)
- GNIS feature ID: 69713

Smyrna Township is one of nineteen current townships in Pope County, Arkansas, USA. As of the 2010 census, its unincorporated population was 187. The township is a part of the Ozark National Forest.

== Geography ==
According to the United States Census Bureau, Smyrna Township covers an area of 70.72 square miles (183.2 km^{2}) with 70.71 square miles (183.1 km^{2}) of it land and 0.01 square miles (0.026 km^{2}) of it water.

=== Cities, towns, villages ===
- Nogo
