= Burnett Township, Pope County, Arkansas =

Burnett Township
- Township
- Location in Arkansas
- Coordinates: 35°19′10″N 92°52′33″W
- Country: United States
- State: Arkansas
- County: Pope

Area
  - Total: 21.75 sq mi (56.3 km^{2})
  - Land: 21.64 sq mi (56.0 km^{2})
  - Water: 0.11 sq mi (0.28 km^{2})
- Elevation: 312 ft (95 m)

Population (2010)
  - Total: 506
  - Density: 23.4/sq mi (9.0/km^{2})
- Time zone: UTC-6 (CST)
  - Summer (DST): UTC-5 (CDT)
- GNIS feature ID: 69698

Burnett Township is one of nineteen current townships in Pope County, Arkansas, USA. As of the 2010 census, its unincorporated population was 506.

== Geography ==
According to the United States Census Bureau, Smyrna Township covers an area of 21.75 square miles (56.3 km^{2}); 21.64 square miles (56.0 km^{2}) of land and 0.11 square miles (0.28 km^{2}) of water.
