= Center Valley, Arkansas =

- Unincorporated community
- Center Valley's position in Arkansas. Center Valley, Arkansas (the United States)
- Coordinates: 35°19′48″N 93°05′05″W
- Country: United States
- State: Arkansas
- County: Pope County, Arkansas
- Elevation: 463 ft (141 m)
- Time zone: UTC-6 (Central (CST))
  - Summer (DST): UTC-5 (CDT)
- GNIS feature ID: 56954

Center Valley is an unincorporated community in Center Township, Pope County, Arkansas, United States.

The Center Valley Well House, which was built in 1940 by the Works Progress Administration, is on the National Register of Historic Places.
