= Col. John Critz Farm Springhouse =

- U.S. National Register of Historic Places
- Location within Arkansas Location within the United States
- Nearest city: Center Hill, Arkansas
- Coordinates: 35°17′14″N 91°52′10″W
- Area: less than one acre
- Architectural style: Fieldstone springhouse
- MPS: White County MPS
- NRHP reference No.: 91001333
- Added to NRHP: July 10, 1992

The Col. John Critz Farm Springhouse was a historic farm outbuilding in rural western White County, Arkansas. It was located northwest of Searcy on the south side of County Road 818. It was a single-story masonry structure, fashioned out of a combination of cut and rustic rubble stone and covered by a gabled roof. The westernmost part of the building, which housed the well, was enclosed in wooden latticework, with a latticework door providing access. Built in 1858, it was the oldest known springhouse in the county, and was also unusual for its mixed stone construction.

The building was listed on the National Register of Historic Places in 1992. It has been listed as destroyed in the Arkansas Historic Preservation Program database.

== See also ==
- Center Valley Well House: NRHP-listed in Pope County, Arkansas
- National Register of Historic Places listings in White County, Arkansas
