= Dover Township, Pope County, Arkansas =

Dover Township
- Township
- Location in Arkansas
- Coordinates: 35°23′30″N 93°07′01″W
- Country: United States
- State: Arkansas
- County: Pope
- Established: 1854

Area
  - Total: 44.61 sq mi (115.5 km^{2})
  - Land: 44.26 sq mi (114.6 km^{2})
  - Water: 0.35 sq mi (0.91 km^{2})
- Elevation: 407 ft (124 m)

Population (2010)
  - Total: 5,704
  - Density: 128.9/sq mi (49.8/km^{2})
- Time zone: UTC-6 (CST)
  - Summer (DST): UTC-5 (CDT)
- GNIS feature ID: 69702

Dover Township is one of nineteen current townships in Pope County, Arkansas, USA. As of the 2010 census, its unincorporated population was 5,704.

== Geography ==
According to the United States Census Bureau, Dover Township covers an area of 44.61 square miles (115.5 km^{2}). Land makes up 44.26 square miles (114.6 km^{2}), and water makes up the remaining 0.35 square miles (0.91 km^{2}).

=== Cities, towns, villages ===
- Dover
- Russellville (part)
