= Sulphur Township, Pope County, Arkansas =

Sulphur Township
- Former Township
- Interactive map of Sulphur Township
- Coordinates: 35°40′30″N 92°59′51″W
- Country: United States
- State: Arkansas
- County: Pope

Area
  - Total: 30 sq mi (78 km^{2})
- Elevation: 1,286 ft (392 m)
- GNIS feature ID: 70148

Sulphur Township is a former township of Pope County, Arkansas. It was located on the northern edge of the county.

== Cities, towns, and villages ==
- Victor
