= Valley Township, Pope County, Arkansas =

Valley Township
- Township
- Location in Arkansas
- Coordinates: 35°20′05″N 93°02′46″W
- Country: United States
- State: Arkansas
- County: Pope
- Established: 1879

Area
  - Total: 22.14 sq mi (57.3 km^{2})
  - Land: 22.12 sq mi (57.3 km^{2})
  - Water: 0.02 sq mi (0.052 km^{2})
- Elevation: 443 ft (135 m)

Population (2010)
  - Total: 3,258
  - Density: 147.3/sq mi (56.9/km^{2})
- Time zone: UTC-6 (CST)
  - Summer (DST): UTC-5 (CDT)
- Area code: 479
- GNIS feature ID: 69714

Valley Township is one of nineteen current townships in Pope County, Arkansas, USA. As of the 2010 census, its unincorporated population was 3,258.

== Geography ==
According to the United States Census Bureau, Valley Township covers an area of 22.14 square miles (57.3 km^{2}) with 22.12 square miles (57.3 km^{2}) of it land and 0.02 square miles (0.052 km^{2}) of it water.

=== Cities, towns, and villages ===
- Center Valley
