= Hill Township, Pope County, Arkansas =

Hill Township
- Former Township
- Interactive map of Hill Township
- Coordinates: 35°34′45″N 92°50′41″W
- Country: United States
- State: Arkansas
- County: Pope
- Established: c. 1920-1930
- Elevation: 1,237 ft (377 m)
- GNIS feature ID: 70141

Hill Township was a township of Pope County, Arkansas. It was located in the northeast part of the county.
