= Center Valley Well House =

- U.S. National Register of Historic Places
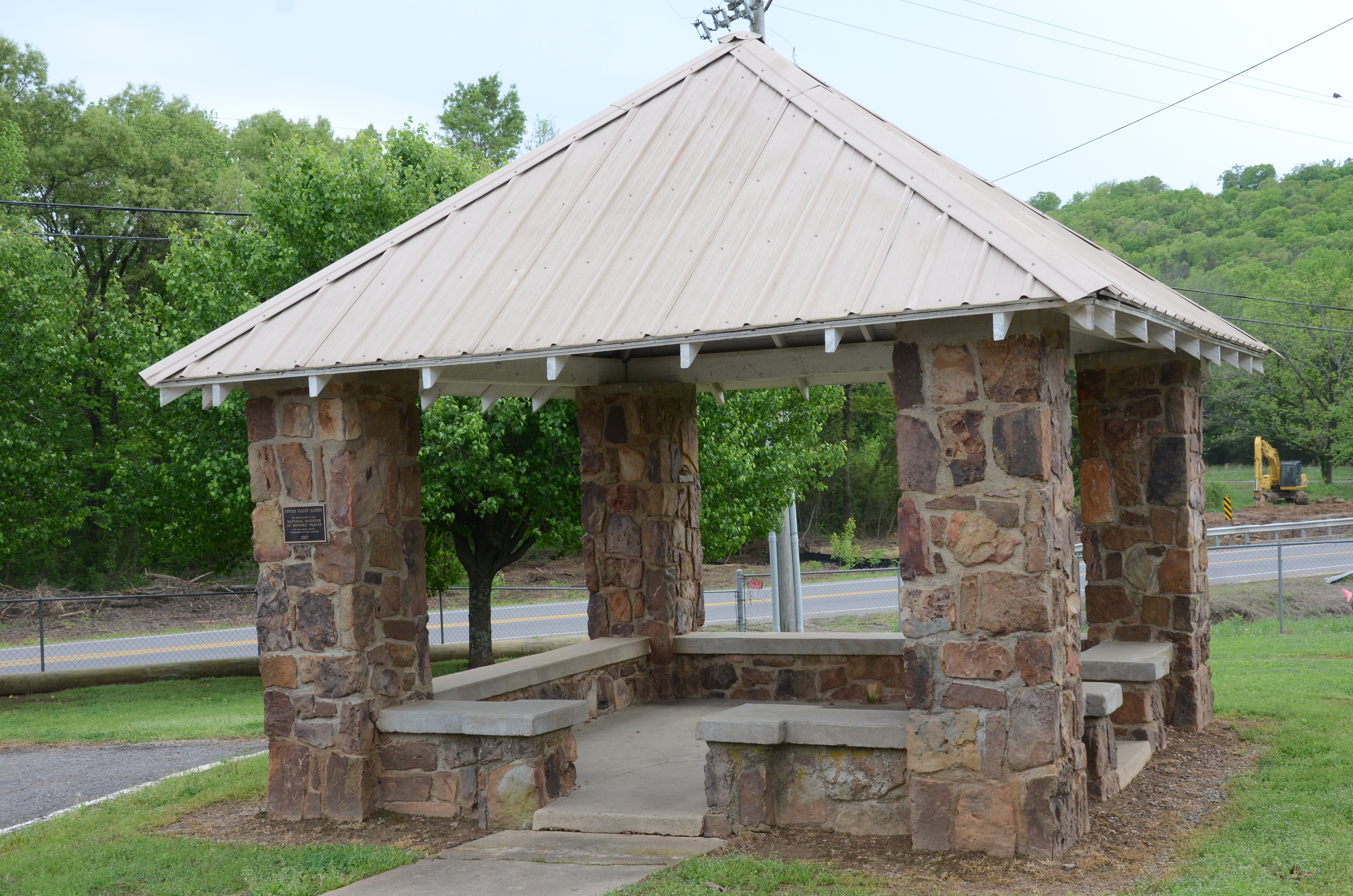

- Location within Arkansas Location within the United States
- Location: AR 124, Center Valley, Arkansas
- Coordinates: 35°19′47″N 93°5′9″W
- Area: less than one acre
- Built by: Works Progress Administration
- Architectural style: Late 19th And Early 20th Century American Movements, Plain Traditional
- MPS: Public Schools in the Ozarks MPS
- NRHP reference No.: 92001206
- Added to NRHP: September 10, 1992

The Center Valley Well House is a historic water well building on the grounds of the Center Valley Elementary School on Arkansas Highway 124 in Center Valley, Arkansas. It is an open-walled square stone structure, consisting of low stone walls and corner posts, which support a shallow-pitch pyramidal roof. The roof has exposed rafter ends in the Craftsman style, and the walls are capped by concrete coping. Two of the walls have openings, which provide access (other than climbing on and over them) to the interior of the structure, which has a concrete floor. It was built in 1940 to shelter the well providing water to the original 1939 school building, using materials left over from its construction. It is a distinctive, yet modest, example of WPA architecture in the community.

The structure was listed on the National Register of Historic Places in 1992.

== See also ==
- Col. John Critz Farm Springhouse: NRHP-listed in White County, Arkansas
- National Register of Historic Places listings in Pope County, Arkansas
