= Treat, Arkansas =

- Unincorporated community
- Treat's position in Arkansas. Treat, Arkansas (the United States)
- Coordinates: 35°19′44″N 93°15′11″W
- Country: United States
- State: Arkansas
- County: Pope
- Elevation: 764 ft (233 m)
- Time zone: UTC-6 (Central (CST))
  - Summer (DST): UTC-5 (CDT)
- GNIS feature ID: 73890

Treat is an unincorporated community in Pope County, Arkansas, United States.

The community was named for one of its earliest settlers, Polk Treat.
