= Clark Township, Pope County, Arkansas =

Clark Township
- Township
- Location in Arkansas
- Coordinates: 35°19′45″N 93°14′46″W
- Country: United States
- State: Arkansas
- County: Pope
- Established: prior to 1836

Area
  - Total: 31.79 sq mi (82.3 km^{2})
  - Land: 25.55 sq mi (66.2 km^{2})
  - Water: 6.24 sq mi (16.2 km^{2})
- Elevation: 361 ft (110 m)

Population (2010)
  - Total: 3,386
  - Density: 132.5/sq mi (51.2/km^{2})
- Time zone: UTC-6 (CST)
  - Summer (DST): UTC-5 (CDT)
- Zip Code: 72847 (London)
- Area code: 479
- GNIS feature ID: 69700

Clark Township is one of nineteen current townships in Pope County, Arkansas, USA. As of the 2010 census, its unincorporated population was 3,386. The Arkansas Nuclear One power plant is located here near the city of London, just outside Russellville.

== Geography ==
According to the United States Census Bureau, Clark Township covers an area of 31.79 square miles (82.3 km^{2}); 25.55 square miles (66.2 km^{2}) of land and 6.24 square miles (16.2 km^{2}) of water. Clark Township gave part of its area to Bayliss Township in 1876.

=== Cities, towns, and villages ===
- London
