= Sand Spring Township, Pope County, Arkansas =

Sand Spring Township
- Former Township
- Interactive map of Sand Spring Township
- Coordinates: 35°27′05″N 93°15′26″W
- Country: United States
- State: Arkansas
- County: Pope

Area
  - Total: 12.0 sq mi (31 km^{2})
- Elevation: 833 ft (254 m)
- GNIS feature ID: 70147

Sand Spring Township is a former township of Pope County, Arkansas. It was located on the western edge of the county.
