= Augsburg, Arkansas =

Augsburg
- Unincorporated community
- Location within Arkansas
- Coordinates: 35°24′52″N 93°14′18″W
- Country: United States
- State: Arkansas
- County: Pope County
- Named for: Augsburg, Germany
- Elevation: 646 ft (197 m)
- GNIS feature ID: 57291

Augsburg is an unincorporated community in Pope County, Arkansas, United States.

In 1883, the first German-speaking Lutheran families began arriving in Pope County, 15 miles northwest of Russellville.

Augsburg was named for the German city of Augsburg. In 1884, they built their first church, Zion Lutheran Church. In 1907, it burned and a new one was built which also burned, in 1978, and replaced in 1979–80. Rev. F. W. Herzberger was the first Pastor and Rev. Joshua Ralston is the current Pastor.

== Pictures of the church ==
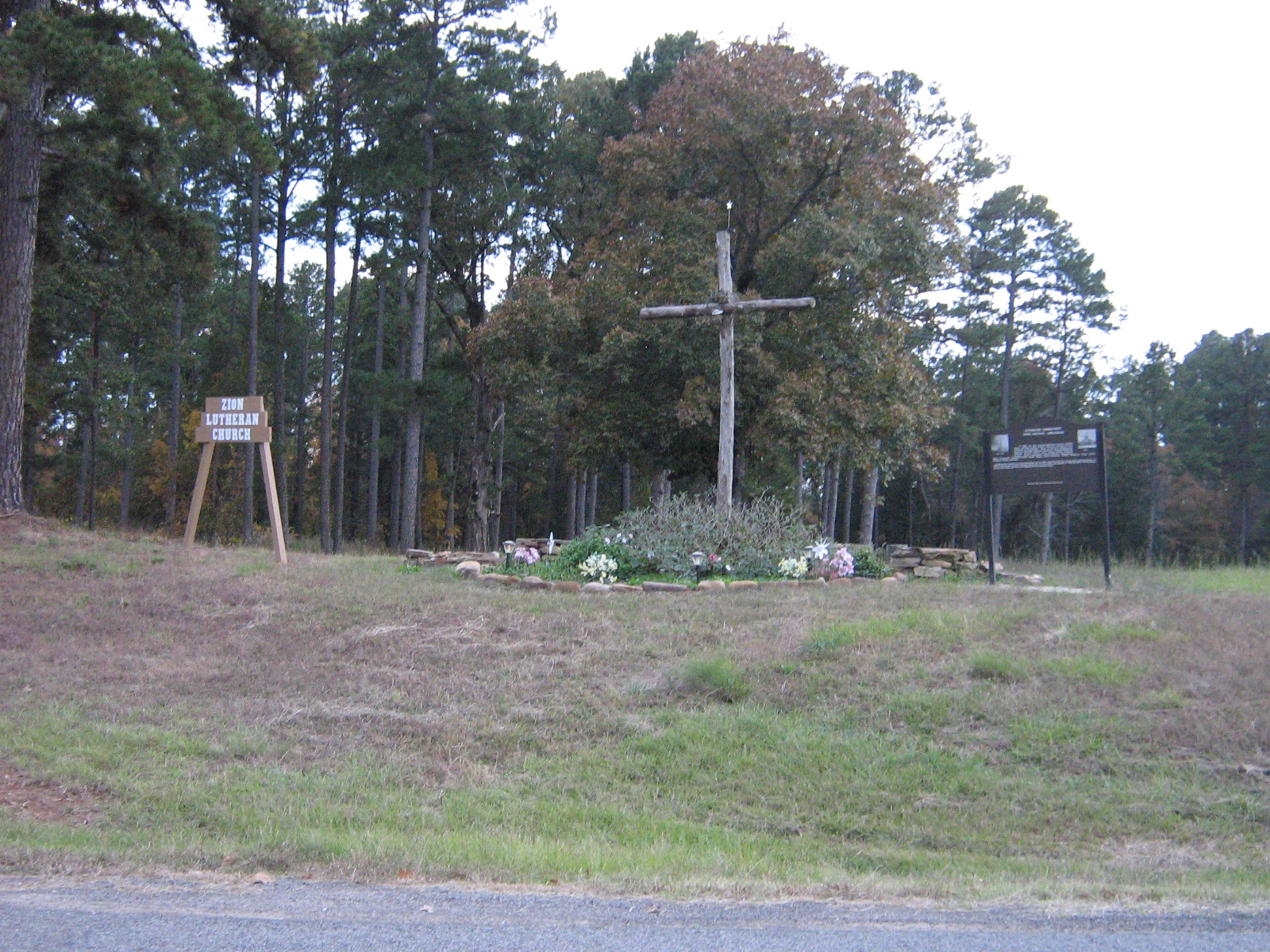
The Place left of
Zion Lutheran Church
2006

Zion Lutheran Church
1907-1978

Zion Lutheran Church
1980-
