= North Fork Township, Pope County, Arkansas =

North Fork Township
- Former Township
- Interactive map of North Fork Township
- Coordinates: 35°36′00″N 93°00′16″W
- Country: United States
- State: Arkansas
- County: Pope
- Elevation: 761 ft (232 m)
- GNIS feature ID: 70146

North Fork Township is a former township of Pope County, Arkansas. It was located in the north central part of the county.

== Cities, towns, and villages ==
- Solo
