= London, Arkansas =

- City
- Location of London in Pope County, Arkansas.
- Coordinates: 35°19′41″N 93°14′30″W
- Country: United States
- State: Arkansas
- County: Pope

Area
  - Total: 3.18 sq mi (8.24 km^{2})
  - Land: 3.17 sq mi (8.21 km^{2})
  - Water: 0.012 sq mi (0.03 km^{2})
- Elevation: 377 ft (115 m)

Population (2020)
  - Total: 936
  - Estimate (2025): 1,061 ▲
  - Density: 300/sq mi (114/km^{2})
- Time zone: UTC-6 (Central (CST))
  - Summer (DST): UTC-5 (CDT)
- ZIP code: 72847
- Area code: 479
- FIPS code: 05-41270
- GNIS feature ID: 2404949

London is a city in Pope County, Arkansas, United States. As of the 2020 census, London had a population of 936. It is part of the Russellville Micropolitan Statistical Area.

== Geography ==
London is located at 35°19′33″N 93°14′12″W (35.325802, -93.236557).

According to the United States Census Bureau, the city has a total area of 2.4 square miles (6.2 km^{2}), of which 2.4 square miles (6.2 km^{2}) is land and 0.04 square miles (0.10 km^{2}) (1.64%) is water.

== Demographics ==
Historical population
Census	Pop.	Note	%±
1880	82		—
1900	268		—
1910	303		13.1%
1920	386		27.4%
1930	355		−8.0%
1940	418		17.7%
1950	353		−15.6%
1960	282		−20.1%
1970	539		91.1%
1980	859		59.4%
1990	825		−4.0%
2000	925		12.1%
2010	1,039		12.3%
2020	936		−9.9%
2025 (est.)	1,061	▲	13.4%
U.S. Decennial Census

=== 2020 census ===
London racial composition
Race	Number	Percentage
White (non-Hispanic)	784	83.76%
Black or African American (non-Hispanic)	3	0.32%
Native American	3	0.32%
Asian	10	1.07%
Other/Mixed	63	6.73%
Hispanic or Latino	73	7.8%

As of the 2020 United States census, there were 936 people, 307 households, and 185 families residing in the city.

=== 2000 census ===
As of the census of 2000, there were 925 people, 359 households, and 268 families residing in the city. The population density was 385.5 inhabitants per square mile (148.8/km^{2}). There were 413 housing units at an average density of 172.1 per square mile (66.4/km^{2}). The racial makeup of the city was 96.6% White, 0.3% Black or African American, 1.41% Native American, 0.22% Asian, and 1.41% from two or more races. 1.0% of the population were Hispanic or Latino of any race.

There were 359 households, out of which 10.0% had children under the age of 1 living with them, 59.9% were married couples living together, 11.1% had a female householder with no husband present, and 25.1% were non-families. 20.6% of all households were made up of individuals, and 8.9% had someone living alone who was 65 years of age or older. The average household size was 2.58 and the average family size was 2.97.

In the city, the population was spread out, with 26.4% under the age of 18, 9.2% from 18 to 24, 29.1% from 25 to 44, 22.4% from 45 to 64, and 13.0% who were 65 years of age or older. The median age was 36 years. For every 100 females, there were 91.9 males. For every 100 females age 18 and over, there were 98.5 males.

The median income for a household in the city was $30,804, and the median income for a family was $36,172. Males had a median income of $28,036 versus $17,391 for females. The per capita income for the city was $14,815. About 8.0% of families and 13.6% of the population were below the poverty line, including 20.8% of those under age 18 and 15.5% of those age 65 or over.

== History ==
London was renamed from Haddoxburg by the first postmaster. The reason is unknown.

- London used to have its own high school. Grades 10-12 moved to Russellville in the early 1950s, and grades 7-9 moved to Russellville in 1965. Currently the London School consists of grades K-through-4.

== Notable people ==
- Trevor Drown - Republican member of the Arkansas House of Representatives for Pope and Van Buren counties since 2015; former London resident
- Brooks Hays - Deceased member of the United States House of Representatives for Arkansas's 5th congressional district, since disbanded, and briefly president of the Southern Baptist Convention.

== Points of interest ==
- London to Paris TSD Rally This is a "Time Speed Distance" (a race of time not speed) rally that is held annually on the last Saturday in October. The rally starts at the London Town Hall then runs into the Ozark National Forest north of London, ending in downtown Paris with a dinner and trophies awarded. It is a play on the fact that both cities share their names with European capitals.
- Polk Salad Festival
- Krung Chickens Festival
