= Liberty Township, Pope County, Arkansas =

Liberty Township
- Township
- Location in Arkansas
- Coordinates: 35°29′40″N 93°03′16″W
- Country: United States
- State: Arkansas
- County: Pope

Area
  - Total: 56.64 sq mi (146.7 km^{2})
  - Land: 56.64 sq mi (146.7 km^{2})
  - Water: 0.0 sq mi (0 km^{2})
- Elevation: 823 ft (251 m)

Population (2010)
  - Total: 837
  - Density: 14.8/sq mi (5.7/km^{2})
- Time zone: UTC-6 (CST)
  - Summer (DST): UTC-5 (CDT)
- GNIS feature ID: 69709

Liberty Township is one of nineteen current townships in Pope County, Arkansas, USA. As of the 2010 census, its unincorporated population was 837.

== Geography ==
According to the United States Census Bureau, Liberty Township covers an area of 56.64 square miles (146.7 km^{2}), all of it land.
