= Lee Township, Pope County, Arkansas =

Lee Township
- Former Township
- Interactive map of Lee Township
- Coordinates: 35°12′10″N 92°54′01″W
- Country: United States
- State: Arkansas
- County: Pope
- Elevation: 305 ft (93 m)
- GNIS feature ID: 70145

Lee Township is a former township of Pope County, Arkansas. It was located in the southeast corner of the county.

== Cities, towns, and villages ==
- Atkins (part)
- Wilson
