= Scotia, Arkansas =

- Unincorporated community
- Position in Arkansas
- Coordinates: 35°19′52″N 93°17′33″W
- Country: United States
- State: Arkansas
- County: Pope
- Elevation: 377 ft (115 m)
- Time zone: UTC-6 (Central (CST))
  - Summer (DST): UTC-5 (CDT)
- GNIS feature ID: 73495

Scotia is an unincorporated community in Pope County, Arkansas, United States.
