= Hogan Township, Franklin County, Arkansas =

Inactive township in Arkansas, United States

Coordinates: 35.426°N 93.769°W

Hogan Township is an inactive township in Franklin County, in the U.S. state of Arkansas.

Hogan Township has the name of Marcus Hogan, an early settler.
