= Holla Bend National Wildlife Refuge =

Wildlife refuge in Arkansas, U.S.

- IUCN category IV (habitat/species management area)
- Location within Arkansas Location within the United States
- Location: Pope County / Yell County, Arkansas, United States
- Nearest city: Dardanelle, Arkansas
- Coordinates: 35°08′30″N 93°03′30″W
- Area: 7,055 acres (28.55 km^{2})
- Established: 1957
- Governing body: U.S. Fish and Wildlife Service
- Website: Holla Bend National Wildlife Refuge

Holla Bend National Wildlife Refuge is a 7,055 acre (28.6 km^{2}) wildlife refuge located 5 miles south-east of Dardanelle, Arkansas.

The Holla Bend National Wildlife Refuge is bounded on one side by the Arkansas River and on its other sides by an oxbow lake that was formerly the main channel of the Arkansas. The oxbow lake was formed in 1954 by the Army Corps of Engineers during their efforts to straighten the Arkansas River navigation channel. The island that was formed by this project between the old and new channels was transferred to the US Department of the Interior in 1957 for use as a wildlife refuge. The land was formerly agricultural land but was abandoned after the 1927 flood.

The primary function of this refuge is to provide a winter home for ducks and geese that migrate from the north along the Mississippi Flyway each year. Up to 100,000 of these fowl live in the refuge during the winter months.
