= Nogo, Arkansas =

- Unincorporated community
- Location within Arkansas Location within the United States
- Coordinates: 35°38′27″N 92°52′46″W
- Country: United States
- State: Arkansas
- County: Pope
- Elevation: 1,726 ft (526 m)
- Time zone: UTC-6 (Central (CST))
  - Summer (DST): UTC-5 (CDT)
- Area code: 479
- GNIS feature ID: 72874

Nogo is a small unincorporated community in Smyrna Township, Pope County, Arkansas, United States. It is part of the Russellville Micropolitan Statistical Area.

Nogo is situated in the Boston Mountains, 11 miles northwest of Kincannon Mountain and 28 miles northeast of Russellville on Arkansas Highway 27 at 35°38′27″N 92°52′46″W, within the Ozark National Forest.

The elevation is 1,720 feet above sea level.
