= Galla Township, Pope County, Arkansas =

Galla Township
- Township
- Location in Arkansas
- Coordinates: 35°13′15″N 93°02′46″W
- Country: United States
- State: Arkansas
- County: Pope

Area
  - Total: 41.57 sq mi (107.7 km^{2})
  - Land: 39.87 sq mi (103.3 km^{2})
  - Water: 1.7 sq mi (4.4 km^{2})
- Elevation: 344 ft (105 m)

Population (2010)
  - Total: 4,681
  - Density: 117.4/sq mi (45.3/km^{2})
- Time zone: UTC-6 (CST)
  - Summer (DST): UTC-5 (CDT)
- Zip Code: 72858 (Pottsville); 72801 (Russellville)
- Area code: 479
- GNIS feature ID: 69704

Galla Township is one of nineteen current townships in Pope County, Arkansas, USA. As of the 2010 census, its total population was 4,681.

== Geography ==
According to the United States Census Bureau, Galla Township covers an area of 41.57 square miles (107.7 km^{2}); 39.87 square miles (103.3 km^{2}) of land and 1.7 square miles (4.4 km^{2}) of water.

=== Cities, towns, and villages ===
- Pottsville (part)
- Russellville (part)
