= Martin Township, Pope County, Arkansas =

Martin Township
- Township
- Location in Arkansas
- Coordinates: 35°28′25″N 93°10′06″W
- Country: United States
- State: Arkansas
- County: Pope

Area
  - Total: 62.84 sq mi (162.8 km^{2})
  - Land: 62.54 sq mi (162.0 km^{2})
  - Water: 0.3 sq mi (0.78 km^{2})
- Elevation: 512 ft (156 m)

Population (2010)
  - Total: 1,589
  - Density: 25.4/sq mi (9.8/km^{2})
- Time zone: UTC-6 (CST)
  - Summer (DST): UTC-5 (CDT)
- GNIS feature ID: 69710

Martin Township is one of nineteen current townships in Pope County, Arkansas, USA. As of the 2010 census, its unincorporated population was 1,589.

== Geography ==
According to the United States Census Bureau, Martin Township covers an area of 62.84 square miles (162.8 km^{2}). Land makes up 62.54 square miles (162.0 km^{2}), and water makes up 0.3 square miles (0.78 km^{2}).
