= Galla Rock, Arkansas =

- Unincorporated community
- Galla Rock's position in Arkansas. Galla Rock, Arkansas (the United States)
- Coordinates: 35°10′40″N 92°58′11″W
- Country: United States
- State: Arkansas
- County: Pope
- Elevation: 322 ft (98 m)
- Time zone: UTC-6 (Central (CST))
  - Summer (DST): UTC-5 (CDT)
- GNIS feature ID: 57788

Galla Rock (also known as “Galley Rock”) is an unincorporated community in Wilson Township, southern Pope County, Arkansas, United States. The community is on Arkansas Route 105 just north of the Arkansas River and the Pope-Yell county line. Atkins is approximately 4.5 miles to the north along Route 105.

It was a thriving city in late 1700 and early 1800s, but is now reduced to a “city of the dead” according to an information plaque at the Galla Rock cemetery.
