= Pottsville, Arkansas =

- City
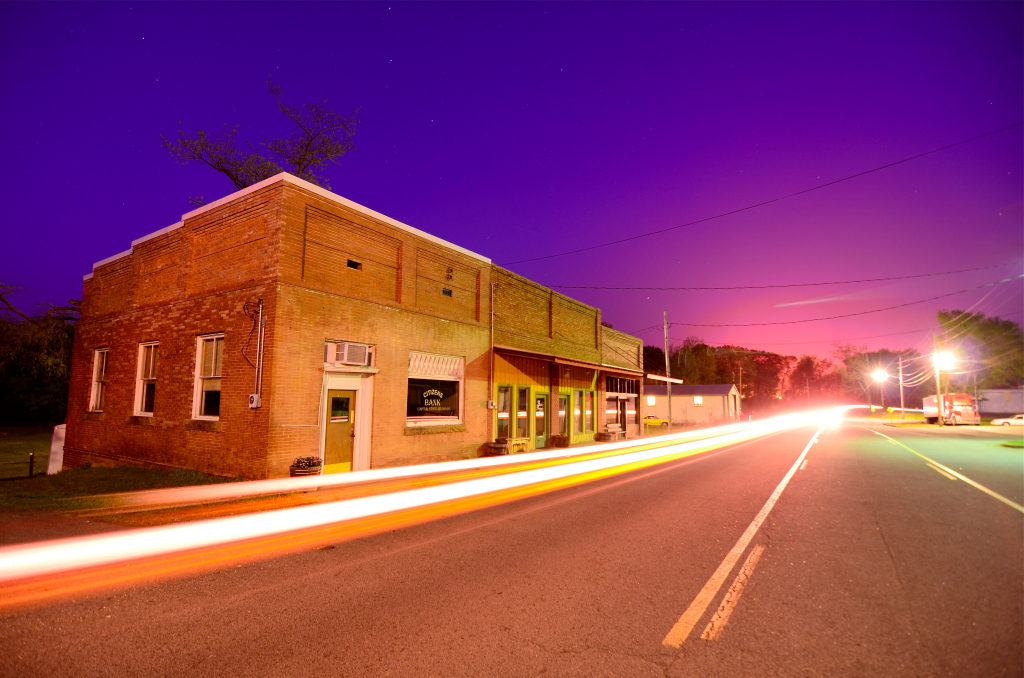
- "Downtown" Pottsville

- Location of Pottsville in Pope County, Arkansas.
- Coordinates: 35°14′56″N 93°03′49″W
- Country: United States
- State: Arkansas
- County: Pope

Area
  - Total: 13.56 sq mi (35.11 km^{2})
  - Land: 13.53 sq mi (35.05 km^{2})
  - Water: 0.023 sq mi (0.06 km^{2})
- Elevation: 387 ft (118 m)

Population (2020)
  - Total: 3,140
  - Estimate (2025): 3,326 ▲
  - Density: 232.0/sq mi (89.59/km^{2})
- Time zone: UTC-6 (Central (CST))
  - Summer (DST): UTC-5 (CDT)
- ZIP code: 72858
- Area code: 479
- FIPS code: 05-56990
- GNIS feature ID: 2404563
- Website: www.pottsvillear.gov

Pottsville is a city in Pope County, Arkansas, United States. As of the 2020 census the population was 3,140. It is part of the Russellville micropolitan area.

== Geography ==
Pottsville is surrounded by Russellville to the west, Atkins to the east, and Crow Mountain to the north.

According to the United States Census Bureau, the town has a total area of 7.5 square miles (19 km^{2}), of which 7.5 square miles (19 km^{2}) is land and 0.04 square miles (0.10 km^{2}) (0.27%) is water.

== Demographics ==
Historical population
Census	Pop.	Note	%±
1900	192		—
1910	205		6.8%
1920	275		34.1%
1930	293		6.5%
1940	308		5.1%
1950	224		−27.3%
1960	250		11.6%
1970	411		64.4%
1980	564		37.2%
1990	984		74.5%
2000	1,271		29.2%
2010	2,838		123.3%
2020	3,140		10.6%
2025 (est.)	3,326	▲	5.9%
U.S. Decennial Census

=== 2020 census ===
As of the 2020 census, Pottsville had a population of 3,140. The median age was 34.3 years. 28.9% of residents were under the age of 18 and 12.6% of residents were 65 years of age or older. For every 100 females there were 102.3 males, and for every 100 females age 18 and over there were 99.9 males age 18 and over.

10.2% of residents lived in urban areas, while 89.8% lived in rural areas.

There were 1,096 households in Pottsville, and 840 families resided in the city. Of all households, 44.8% had children under the age of 18 living in them. Of all households, 59.5% were married-couple households, 14.1% were households with a male householder and no spouse or partner present, and 20.3% were households with a female householder and no spouse or partner present. About 18.8% of all households were made up of individuals and 8.3% had someone living alone who was 65 years of age or older.

There were 1,187 housing units, of which 7.7% were vacant. The homeowner vacancy rate was 1.4% and the rental vacancy rate was 6.7%.

Pottsville racial composition
Race	Number	Percentage
White (non-Hispanic)	2,610	83.12%
Black or African American (non-Hispanic)	18	0.57%
Native American	26	0.83%
Asian	30	0.96%
Other/Mixed	149	4.75%
Hispanic or Latino	307	9.78%

=== 2000 census ===
As of the 2000 census the population stood at 1,271, with 475 households and 372 families in the town. The population density was 169.3 inhabitants per square mile (65.4/km^{2}). There were 500 housing units at an average density of 66.6 per square mile (25.7/km^{2}). The racial makeup of the town was 95.67% White, 0.79% Black or African American, 0.71% Native American, 0.79% Asian, 0.16% from other races, and 1.89% from two or more races. 0.55% of the population were Hispanic or Latino of any race.

Of the 475 households 38.1% had children under the age of 18 living with them, 63.4% were married couples living together, 9.1% had a female householder with no husband present, and 21.5% were non-families. 18.1% of households were one person and 8.8% were one person aged 65 or older. The average household size was 2.68 and the average family size was 3.02.

The age distribution was 26.8% under the age of 18, 7.6% from 18 to 24, 31.2% from 25 to 44, 22.5% from 45 to 64, and 11.9% 65 or older. The median age was 36 years. For every 100 females, there were 100.2 males. For every 100 females age 18 and over, there were 99.8 males.

The median household income was $32,841 and the median family income was $37,763. Males had a median income of $27,237 versus $18,625 for females. The per capita income for the town was $15,066. About 12.6% of families and 16.7% of the population were below the poverty line, including 27.8% of those under age 18 and 10.0% of those age 65 or over.
