= Pope County, Arkansas =

County in Arkansas, United States

- County
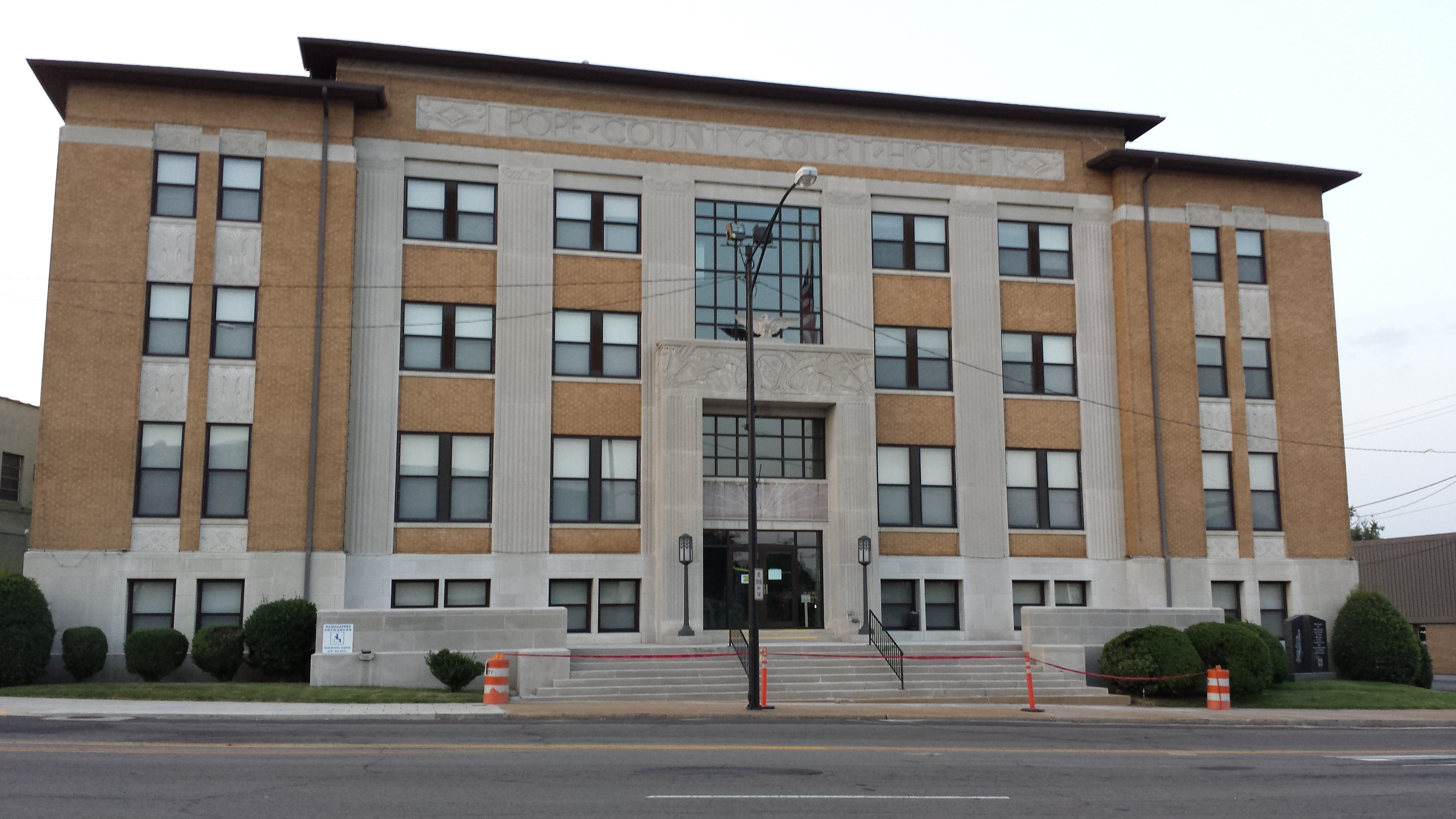
- Pope County Courthouse

- Location within the U.S. state of Arkansas
- Coordinates: 35°25′35″N 93°01′55″W
- Country: United States
- State: Arkansas
- Founded: November 2, 1829
- Named for: John Pope
- Seat: Russellville
- Largest city: Russellville

Area
  - Total: 831 sq mi (2,150 km^{2})
  - Land: 813 sq mi (2,110 km^{2})
  - Water: 18 sq mi (47 km^{2}) 2.2%

Population (2020)
  - Total: 63,381
  - Estimate (2025): 64,976 ▲
  - Density: 78.0/sq mi (30.1/km^{2})
- Time zone: UTC−6 (Central)
  - Summer (DST): UTC−5 (CDT)
- Congressional district: 4th
- Website: www.popecountyar.gov

Pope County is a county in the U.S. state of Arkansas. As of the 2020 census, the population was 63,381. The county seat is Russellville. The county was formed on November 2, 1829, from a portion of Crawford County and named for John Pope, the third governor of the Arkansas Territory. Pope County was the nineteenth (of seventy-five) county formed. The county's borders changed eighteen times in the 19th century with the creation of new counties and adjustments between counties. The current boundaries were set on March 8, 1877.

Pope County is geographically diverse, with the Arkansas River Valley and its farmlands and towns in the southern portion and the Ozarks covering nearly two-thirds of the county to the north, including a portion of the rugged Boston Mountains, a deeply dissected plateau. Approximately 40% of the county is in the Ozark National Forest.

Pope County is an alcohol prohibition or dry county.

Pope County is part of the Russellville, Arkansas, Micropolitan Statistical Area which encompasses all of Pope and Yell County.

== History ==
=== Louisiana Purchase and Cherokee Lands ===
In 1803, Napoleon Bonaparte sold French Louisiana to the United States, including all of Arkansas. Today, that transaction is known as the Louisiana Purchase.

By 1804, President Jefferson, with others, looked to the new lands as a refuge for Indian peoples on lands near American settlements, keeping American settlers and Indian societies separate.

Soon after the Louisiana Purchase, much of the region encompassing future Pope and other counties was designated as lands for the removal of eastern native tribes. In about 1805, Cherokee living in southeast Missouri on the Mississippi River moved to the Arkansas River at the suggestion of Louisiana Territory Governor James Wilkinson. After the New Madrid earthquakes, most of the Cherokee—as many as 2,000 people—who had lived along the St. Francis River relocated to the Arkansas River Valley.

In 1815, the US government established a Cherokee Reservation in the Arkansas district of the Missouri Territory and sought to persuade the Cherokee to relocate there voluntarily. The reservation boundaries extended from north of the Arkansas River to the southern bank of the White River. The Cherokee who moved to this reservation became known as the "Old Settlers" or Western Cherokee.

A village on the Illinois Bayou served as the capital of the Western Cherokees from 1813 to 1824.

The Treaty of 1817 secured lands in Arkansas for the Western Cherokees north of the Arkansas River between Point Remove and Fort Smith and removed all citizens of the United States, except Persis Lovely, the widow of Indian Agenet William Lovely. Most white settlers moved to new locations south of the river. By 1820, new Cherokee emigrants from the east had blended with the Old Settlers in a new "colony" with a string of Cherokee villages stretching for over 70 miles above Point Remove. About half of this distance was in the future Pope County. An 1820 description by Territorial Governor James Miller called it a "lovely, rich part of the country".

In 1818, the chief of the Arkansas Cherokees, Tol-on-tus-ky (Tolunskee or Tollontiskee), requested that the American Board of Commissioners for Foreign Missions send a mission to Arkansas. The assignment was given to Cephas Washburn and his brother-in-law, Alfred Finney, who established a mission in 1820 on the west side of Illinois Bayou about four miles from the Arkansas River. The stream was navigable for keelboats about nine months of the year. The mission was named Dwight for the late Rev. Timothy Dwight, president of Yale College and a corporate member of the American Board of Commissioners for Foreign Missions. The site was on a gentle rise covered with a growth of oak and pine at the foot of which issued a large spring of pure water. Above, below, and opposite the site was plenty of excellent bottomland for cultivation. The mission was conveniently near Indian villages. The mission eventually included more than 25 buildings, including seven log cabins, a dining hall, library, post office, lumber house, carpenter shop, saw mill, meat house, grist mill, and barn. The land where Dwight Mission buildings were is now under the waters of Lake Dardanelle, but the cemetery is still on the hill nearby.

By the time the Arkansas Territory was established in 1819, the western Cherokees represented at least 20 percent of the Territory's total population, mostly centered along the Arkansas River and in the future Pope County.

=== Arkansas Territory ===
Beginning in the 1820s, an increasing number of settlers came to Arkansas from southern states, creating an environment for the eastern Indians who had moved there that was similar to the one from which they had been expelled. Under a new treaty concluded on May 6, 1828, the western boundary of Arkansas was established with seven million acres to the west of that provided to the Cherokees "forever". The Cherokees agreed to leave the Arkansas lands within 14 months. In 1829, all of the people at Dwight Mission moved to the new Indian Territory—in present-day Oklahoma—, where Dwight Mission was re-established in a new location.

Pope County was established on November 2, 1829, ten years after the establishment of the Territory of Arkansas, with a temporary county seat to be at the home of John Bollinger. A county seat selection commission elected in January 1830 chose the community of Scotia, home of Judge Andrew Scott, a neighbor of Bollinger, as the permanent county seat. With the formation of Johnson County in 1833, Scotia was but half a mile from the county line. The county seat was moved to Dwight and, then, in 1834, to Norristown, a growing town of the Arkansas River upstream and across the river from Dardanelle.

Transportation into Arkansas' interior in the early years was mostly limited to river travel. While navigable, the Arkansas River was unpredictable, alternating between floods and droughts and infested with sandbars and snags. The winding Arkansas River passed through a vast swampy floodplain that covered much of eastern Arkansas, a breeding ground for malaria-bearing mosquitoes. Settlers in those areas soon suffered from malarial fevers and other ailments, and Arkansas gained a reputation as a sick and swampy land. Most pioneers avoided Arkansas and chose other destinations to settle in. Those who ventured further—into central and western parts of the territory, and Pope County—found good soils along the river valley and, in the mountains, healthy forests of pine, oaks, and hickory, with well-drained soils for farming in the valleys, a wealth of forage for grazing, and an abundance of game animals. At the end of the territorial years, the bulk of the people of Pope County were plain-folk farmers, herders, and hunters.

=== Antebellum Pope County ===
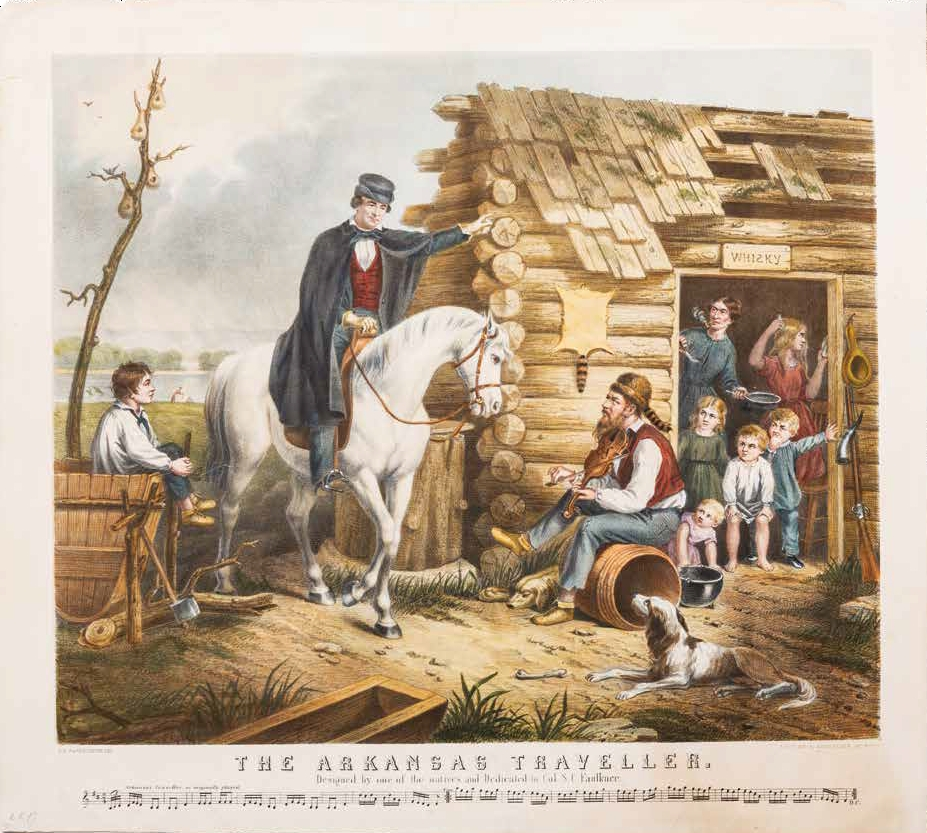
"The Arkansas Traveller. Designed by one of the natives and dedicated to Col. S. C. Faulkner." Lithograph after a painting by Edward Washburn (1830-1861), lithographed by Leopold Grozelier (1830-1865) and hand-colored, printed, and published by J. H. Bufford's, Boston, 1859.

When Yell County was established on December 5, 1840, the county seat was again on the periphery of the county. In 1841, commissioners moved the county seat to Dover, a more central location, after selecting it for that purpose. The first courthouse was a log structure.

With the outbreak of war with Mexico, in July 1846, a company of mounted infantry volunteers from Pope County, organized under Captain David West, along with volunteer units from other counties, entered service in the Indian Territory, replacing regular Army troops that had been dispatched to Mexico. The Arkansas volunteer troops provided an essential Federal military presence along the state's western border and eastern portion of the Indian Territory during a period of violent disputes between factions in the Cherokee Nation. After the arrival of three companies of regular Army dragoon recruits, the Pope County volunteers returned home in late April 1847.

There were 695 white families in Pope County in 1850. The total population, according to the census, was 4,710; 10.2% were slaves (479 Individuals). Only 1,640 individuals had been born in Arkansas. Most of the rest had been born in southern slave states. There were 11 who were foreign-born, including Dr. Thomas Russell. Sixty-two percent of the white population was under 15 years old. Twenty-three individuals were seventy or older; just two had made it to eighty. Over eighty percent of the population was supported by agriculture, mostly by self-sufficient farm families. Other occupations included carpentry, blacksmithing, tanning, lumbering, merchandising, and wagon-making. There were some lawyers, teachers, doctors, and preachers as well as millers, saddlers, shoemakers, cabinet-makers, county officials, and at least one tar kiln operator. There were 100 slaveowners, and ten owned ten or more slaves. Three farmers had twenty or more slaves, enough to be considered "planters" in the slave culture of the South. There were no free blacks documented. There were thirteen sawmills—two steam-powered and the rest powered by water—, two tanneries, and a cotton factory producing 22,500 pounds of thread annually. Dr. Thomas Russell, for whom Russellville was named, owned 680 acres of land, four slaves, a store, and ten town lots. There were eleven one-teacher subscription schools with a total enrollment of 326 students. Churches totaled ten, according to the census, with 6 Methodist, 2 Baptist, 1 Cumberland Presbyterian, and 1 Old School Presbyterian. Principal causes of death, were, in order, croup, winter fever, cholera, hives, diarrhea, consumption and accidents. More than half of all deaths were infants under one year of age, and only nine percent were over forty.

Dover, the county seat, was the most important town between Little Rock and Fort Smith in 1850. Galla Rock, south of present-day Atkins, and Norristown were important trading centers with goods transported on the Arkansas River.

In the late 1850s, Edward Payson Washburn took inspiration from Pope County scenes near the family's Norristown home for his most famous work, The Arkansas Traveler, the composition of which was derived from a story he heard from Colonel Sandford C. Faulkner. Supposedly occurring on the campaign trail in Arkansas in 1840, Colonel Faulkner's humorous story ends with a fiddle-playing squatter being won over by the traveler (man on horse in image). Washburn's father was Cephas Washburn, founder of Dwight Mission.

While the majority of the population of Pope County consisted of rural families, many were squatters on state or federal land. In 1851, about 76% of households did not own land and, in 1860, some 66% did not.

In 1860, though its population had grown by 67.4% in a decade, Pope County was still sparsely settled. The slave population had grown to 12.4% (978 individuals). Along with the rest of Arkansas, it was on an economic frontier attracting relatively large numbers of new settlers, mostly from other southern states. Even though Arkansas had been a state since 1836, the few communities were small with limited development. The population in the 1860 census included 6,905 whites. There were 978 slaves, mostly in the agricultural areas in the southern part of the county. Most families were in the southern lowlands of the county. A railroad being developed to be built through the county—the Little Rock & Fort Smith—was to include a depot in Dover.

=== Civil War ===
After South Carolina seceded in December 1860, an election was scheduled in Arkansas for February 1861 to vote on whether Arkansas would secede and if a secession convention would be called. In Pope County, a straw poll before the election rejected secession by a four-to-one margin. In the statewide vote on February 18, secession was voted down. The convention in March rejected an ordinance of secession, scheduled a vote of the people on secession for August, and adjourned subject to recall by the president of the convention. After Confederate guns fired on Fort Sumter and President Lincoln issued a call for support from the states, many advocated for recalling the convention, but others were opposed, such as the delegate from Pope County, William Stout, who wrote, "I believe it is the President's duty to put down rebellion. I have always thought so."

Convention President David Walker issued a proclamation calling for the convention to reconvene on May 6 where, in the final vote, the Arkansas Ordinance of Secession was passed by a vote of 69 to 1.

In 1861, much of Pope County was still a wilderness frontier. There was no railroad. Roads were little more than tracks, and there were no bridges crossing streams. The population was sparse, with most dependent on subsistence farming. Many were squatters not owning the land their cabins were on.

During the war, what little civil authority there was collapsed throughout Arkansas. By 1863, travel was dangerous in most of the state, farming hazardous, and county government inoperative. On April 29, 1862, the Pope County Court ordered county records were moved to a cave for protection where they remained until July 1865. Several skirmishes took place in the county, but no major engagements occurred. On April 8, 1865, Dover, including the courthouse, was burned.

The Civil War's primary principles—for the South, independence and the preservation of slavery, and for the North, the restoration of the Union—soon lost their relevance in the thinly settled Pope County. As in much of the region, the already hard lives of much of the population were disrupted by wartime loyalties separating unionists from rebels. For many, the struggle turned into a no-holds-barred conflict of killing and driving out opponents in the interest of ensuring the survival of families and allies. Of those who were able to, many fled to safer places. Most able-bodied men were away from home on one side or the other. Many of those left behind—women, old men, and children—fell prey to bands of guerrillas aligned to the Confederacy—called bushwhackers by Union sympathizers—or the Union—called jayhawkers by southerners. Some belonged to neither side, attacking both sides and committing murder and arson and "pilfering and robbing of clothes, rustling cattle, emptying corn bins, taking whatever they wanted". Others actively supported one side or the other, such as William Stout's cooperation with the federals, though it probably led to his assassination in 1865.

With Federal troops stationed at Lewisburg—on the river south of present-day Morrilton—and Clarksville in 1864, foraging parties seeking supplies ranged into Pope County. Many families remaining in the county suffered incursions by the military and guerrilla bands.

Following the Civil War, Pope County remained sparsely settled, with only 503 more people in the 1870 census than in 1860. Many of the people who had fled the upheaval and uncertainties of the war years never returned and, of course, many former residents had not survived the conflict. The Little Rock and Fort Smith Railroad had been postponed by the conflict, with the first rails not laid until 1869.

=== Reconstruction ===
Arkansas became the second former Confederate state to be fully restored to the Union in June 1868, but political and social stability was still years away. During the military reconstruction period (1867-1868), when Arkansas was placed in the Fourth Military District, companies E and G of the Nineteenth Infantry, were stationed in Pope County and headquartered at Dover for a year and a half. In 1868, a militia law passed by the general assembly authorized the governor to enroll a state guard modeled, generally, after the U. S. Army. Elements of this guard would be used four years later in Pope County.

Between 1865 and 1870, at least five county officials were assassinated: Sheriff Archibald D. Napier and Deputy Sheriff Albert Parks on October 24, 1865, County Clerk William Stout on December 4, 1865, Sheriff W. Morris Williams on August 20, 1866, and Russellville Postmaster John L. Harkey on July 27, 1868. Napier and Williams both served as Captain of the Third Arkansas Cavalry Regiment (Union), Company I, where Wallace H. Hickox, Stout's successor, was a lieutenant and John H. Williams, a successor to Parks and Morris Williams' brother, was a bugler.

On March 1, 1870, the new Pope County jail in Dover was burned. A man named Glover later claimed responsibility.

==== Militia War ====
A period of a little over seven months in 1872 and 1873 came to be known as the Pope County Militia War. However, there were no battles or skirmishes. There were no engagements between organized opponents of any kind. Instead, an unofficial militia, headed by four county officers, exerted excessive and harsh control over the county, including threats to burn Dover, the county seat. By the end of the period, three of the four officials were dead.

=== Late Nineteenth Century ===
By June 1873, regular service on the Little Rock & Fort Smith Railroad extended all the way through the county as far as Clarksville in Johnson County. County commerce that had previously made Dover the business center of the county moved to Russellville or Atkins.

==== County Seat move from Dover to Russellville ====
With the new railroad running eight miles south of the county seat at Dover and the gradual relocation of county commerce toward Russellville and Atkins, moving the county seat was inevitable. Russellville was developing into the business center of the county and a newer town, Atkins, was growing fast and would compete as a potential new location for the county seat.

It took 15 years from an act from the Arkansas General Assembly moving the county seat to Russellville—reversed the next year, sending it back to Dover—until the new courthouse was completed in Russellville. Dover had been selected in the 1840s for its more central location in the county. Thirty years later, the southern townships held the majority of the population and paid a large majority of the taxes.

===== County Seat—1870s =====
An act to move the county seat passed in the General Assembly in 1873 but was repealed during a special session of the General Assembly in 1874. The moving of the county seat from Russellville back to Dover in 1874 was because moving the county seat from Dover to Russellville had not been done by the citizens but rather by the legislature. The railroad had just opened up through Russellville, and the citizens did not see that the business center of the county had shifted so much as yet to justify the change.

Winds from a storm on March 8, 1878, damaged the county courthouse in Dover, rendering it "unfit and unsafe". With the county having no funds to repair the structure, its condition became a consideration for some in the issue of moving the county seat, with citizens of Russellville offering a building site and $2,500 to build a new courthouse there at no cost to the taxpayers. A church was used for a courtroom during terms of the circuit court while the courthouse was unavailable.

On September 2, 1878, an election was held, as ordered by the county court to determine:

1. whether to move the county seat from Dover, and
2. whether to change the county seat to Atkins or to Russellville if the voters decided to move the seat from Dover.

Following the special election, the county clerk certified that a majority (1,240) of the qualified electors voted to move the county seat from Dover. However, neither Atkins nor Russellville received enough votes to determine the location of the new county seat. The results of the election were challenged in court.

On April 30, 1879, an election was ordered by the county court to be held June 20, 1879, to determine whether the county seat would be changed to Russellville or to Atkins. On June 17, Russellville citizens increased the bond amount for building a new courthouse from $2,500 to $10,000.

The results of that election were moot after the courts overturned the September 1878 vote. The case made it to the Arkansas Supreme Court which returned the case to the circuit court of Judge W. D. Jacoway. Jacoway's subsequent ruling was that there were 200 votes of men voting in the wrong township and 150 ballots that were marked "for Russellville" that were not marked for a move "from" Dover. The ruling said that the proposition to move the county seat received just 890 votes. There were 2,266 qualified voters at the time of the election. The law required a majority of qualified voters to approve the move of the county seat, which, for this election, would have been 1,134 votes "for" the move.

During the 1879 September term of Pope County Circuit Court, a grand jury condemned the courthouse as "wholy unfit for use as a Court House."

===== County Seat—1880s =====
With the 1878 vote to move the county seat from Dover reversed, repairs to the county courthouse in Dover were made in the early 1880s. The contract for the repairs was to W. R. Cox of Atkins for $1,000.

A September 6, 1886, election—ordered on July 21, 1886, in response to two petitions—had three proposals:

1. Shall the County Seat be removed or changed? (removed meant moved)
2. Shall the County Seat be removed from Dover to Russellville?
3. Shall the County Seat be removed from Dover to Atkins?

Again, a majority voted to move the county seat from Dover, but neither Russellville nor Atkins received enough votes to move it there. Pope County had 3,688 registered voters at the time. The move to Russellville received 1,485 votes (40.2% of registered voters), and Atkins garnered 1200 (32.5% of the registered voters).

In October 1886, the county court set aside the election, finding it void for bribery, with Russellville having offered to erect a courthouse if she was selected as the county seat. The decision was appealed to the circuit court, where M. L. Davis was elected special judge to try the contested case. On November 12, Davis reversed the county court's decision and ordered that an election be held on March 19, 1887, to determine whether the county seat would be moved to Russellville or to Atkins. His decision was appealed to the Arkansas Supreme Court.

The offer that Russellville's leading citizens made included lots in Russellville as the site for a new courthouse and a $50,000 bond for the construction, without cost to the county, of a "good and sufficient two story brick court house" and a "good, sufficient, and commodious jail". Before the September 1886 election, citizens in Atkins made a very similar offer.

The certified result of the March 19, 1887, special election was 1,399 votes for Russellville and 1271 for Atkins, with Russellville selected by a margin of 128 votes out of 2,670 total votes cast.

The Arkansas Supreme Court affirmed the ruling by Judge Davis on June 4, 1887, clearing the way for the county seat to be moved to Russellville and for the construction of a new courthouse and jail. Title to properties in Russellville for the new courthouse and jail had been tendered to the county in March. On June 13, the bondsmen for the new courthouse held a meeting and took steps deemed necessary to start the work and on September 23, the cornerstone was laid. County records were moved to Russellville in August and, temporarily, the county courtroom and clerk's office were upstairs in the R. J. Wilson Building.

The new courthouse and jail in Russellville were accepted as completed on May 16, 1888, by J.M. Haney, W. H. Poynter, and L. D. Ford, commissioners appointed by the county court to examine and receive the new county structures.

==== Railroads, ferry, and a bridge ====
With the completion of the railroad through the county and the move of the county seat, some smaller communities such as Norristown and Dover went into a period of decline or disappeared.

On August 15, 1893, train operations began on the Dardanelle and Russellville Railroad (D&R). A 4.8-mile (7.7 km) shortline that still exists, the D&R railroad runs from Russellville to the north bank of the Arkansas River at North Dardanelle, across from Dardanelle, Arkansas. The line was originally built primarily to transport agricultural products—primarily cotton—from Dardanelle to the LR&FS depot in Russellville. For the first eight years of operation, freight and passengers crossed the river on a ferry.

In 1891, the ferry across the river at Dardanelle was supplanted by the Dardanelle pontoon bridge, which was in use for nearly four decades except for periods when its operation was interrupted because of high river flows or other disruptions.

==== Coal mining ====
See also Arkansas River Valley coal mining

Coal fields in Arkansas extend from southern Pope County to near the state's western border, in an area about 33 miles wide and 60 miles long. Coal was mined in Pope County from the latter portion of the 19th century through the middle of the 20th century.

=== Twentieth Century ===
On the night of January 16, 1906, nearly half of the business district of Russellville was destroyed by fire. The county courthouse was spared, though most of the buildings in its block of the city were lost.

In 1931, the 1878 county courthouse was demolished and replaced with the current building.

Arkansas's first highway rest area was built in Pope County on Highway 7 in the 1930s. Despite its challenging terrain, Highway 7 became a major route for travelers, connecting Russellville and Harrison. This was back when cars were a relatively new invention, and there were few places to stop and take a break. "Rotary Ann" rest stop was named after the Rotary Club's ladies' auxiliary. The Russellville branch recognized the need for a rest area with bathrooms and scenic views along Highway 7 and worked with the Rotary Club to create a scenic overlook in the 1930s.

In 1954, the U. S. Army Corps of Engineers dug a new, straight channel for the Arkansas River across the 6-mile "bend" of Pope County's Holla Bend. The project was part of the long-term development of the river for flood control and mitigation and future use of the river for navigation. The new channel is entirely in Pope County. Holla Bend, now on the south side of the river, is accessible by land only through neighboring Yell County. After the channel project was completed, the Corps turned 4,068 acres back to the General Services Administration (GSA), advising the GSA that the land, which had been part of the "Holla Bend Cutoff" flood control project, was surplus. Following a period of uncertainty due to local opposition, Holla Bend was acquired by the United States Fish and Wildlife Service in 1957 for development and use as a national wildlife refuge. Additional acquisitions have brought the total number of acres to 7,055 currently under refuge management.

=== Twenty-First Century ===
==== Casino Issue ====
In the November 2018 general election, Pope County was one of four counties designated as locations for the first legal casinos in Arkansas in Issue 4, which, when passed, became Amendment 100 to the Arkansas Constitution. The other three counties were Jefferson, Garland, and Crittenden. While the casinos in the other counties are open and operating, the casino license in Pope County was long mired in litigation, primarily due to two lawsuits by Gulfside Casino Partnership, one filed on August 15, 2019, and the other filed on March 9, 2021. The Arkansas Racing Commission awarded the Pope County license to Gulfside Casino Partnership on July 31, 2020, but, after the Arkansas Supreme Court reversed and dismissed a ruling by Pulaski County Circuit Judge Tim Fox and rendered Gulfside ineligible, the license was awarded to Cherokee Nation Businesses and Legends Resort and Casino on November 12, 2021. Pulaski County Circuit Judge Tim Fox voided that license in a ruling on January 3, 2013. The Arkansas Supreme Court affirmed Fox's ruling on October 26, 2023. After changes to the Arkansas gaming rules and a new application period, the Pope County Casino license was issued to Cherokee Nation Entertainment, a division of Cherokee Nation Businesses.

In November 2024, Issue 2, a ballot option placed on the ballot after a successful petition campaign, removed Pope County from Amendment 100 and voided the Pope County casino license. Three days after the election, Cherokee Nation Businesses, Cherokee Nation Entertainment, and a Russellville resident filed suit in federal court against the State of Arkansas. In March 2025, Judge D. Price Marshall Jr. ruled largely in favor of Arkansas. Cherokee Nation and the Russellville resident appealed Judge Marshall's decision to the U.S. Court of Appeals for the Eighth Circuit.

== Geography ==
According to the U.S. Census Bureau, the county has a total area of 831 square miles (2,150 km^{2}), of which 813 square miles (2,110 km^{2}) is land and 18 square miles (47 km^{2}) (2.2%) is water.

=== Major highways ===
- Interstate 40
- U.S. Highway 64
- Arkansas Highway 7
- Arkansas Highway 7S
- Arkansas Highway 7T
- Arkansas Highway 16
- Arkansas Highway 27
- Arkansas Highway 105
- Arkansas Highway 123
- Arkansas Highway 124
- Arkansas Highway 164
- Arkansas Highway 247
- Arkansas Highway 324
- Arkansas Highway 326
- Arkansas Highway 331
- Arkansas Highway 333
- Arkansas Highway 363
- Arkansas Highway 980

=== Adjacent counties ===
- Newton County (northwest)
- Searcy County (northeast)
- Van Buren County (northeast)
- Conway County (southeast)
- Yell County (south)
- Logan County (southwest)
- Johnson County (west)

=== National protected areas ===
- Holla Bend National Wildlife Refuge (part)
- Ozark National Forest (part)
- East Fork Wilderness

== Demographics ==
Historical population
Census	Pop.	Note	%±
1830	1,483		—
1840	2,850		92.2%
1850	4,710		65.3%
1860	7,883		67.4%
1870	8,386		6.4%
1880	14,322		70.8%
1890	19,458		35.9%
1900	21,715		11.6%
1910	24,527		12.9%
1920	27,153		10.7%
1930	26,547		−2.2%
1940	25,682		−3.3%
1950	23,291		−9.3%
1960	21,177		−9.1%
1970	28,607		35.1%
1980	39,021		36.4%
1990	45,883		17.6%
2000	54,469		18.7%
2010	61,754		13.4%
2020	63,381		2.6%
2025 (est.)	64,976	▲	2.5%
U.S. Decennial Census; 1790–1960 1900–1990; 1990–2000 2010–2017

=== 2020 census ===
As of the 2020 census, the county had a population of 63,381. The median age was 36.3 years. 22.7% of residents were under the age of 18 and 16.2% of residents were 65 years of age or older. For every 100 females there were 97.4 males, and for every 100 females age 18 and over there were 95.4 males age 18 and over.

The racial makeup of the county was 81.1% White, 3.3% Black or African American, 1.0% American Indian and Alaska Native, 1.1% Asian, <0.1% Native Hawaiian and Pacific Islander, 5.4% from some other race, and 8.1% from two or more races. Hispanic or Latino residents of any race comprised 10.1% of the population.

44.1% of residents lived in urban areas, while 55.9% lived in rural areas.

There were 24,196 households in the county, of which 31.5% had children under the age of 18 living in them. Of all households, 49.4% were married-couple households, 18.4% were households with a male householder and no spouse or partner present, and 25.4% were households with a female householder and no spouse or partner present. About 26.7% of all households were made up of individuals and 11.0% had someone living alone who was 65 years of age or older.

There were 26,902 housing units, of which 10.1% were vacant. Among occupied housing units, 67.5% were owner-occupied and 32.5% were renter-occupied. The homeowner vacancy rate was 1.7% and the rental vacancy rate was 9.4%.

=== 2000 census ===
As of the 2000 census, there were 54,469 people, 20,701 households, and 15,008 families residing in the county. The population density was 67 inhabitants per square mile (26/km^{2}). There were 22,851 housing units at an average density of 28 per square mile (11/km^{2}). The racial makeup of the county was 93.73% White, 2.61% Black or African American, 0.68% Native American, 0.64% Asian, 0.03% Pacific Islander, 0.93% from other races, and 1.39% from two or more races. 2.06% of the population were Hispanic or Latino of any race.

There were 20,701 households, out of which 34.30% had children under the age of 18 living with them, 58.60% were married couples living together, 10.20% had a female householder with no husband present, and 27.50% were non-families. 23.00% of all households were made up of individuals, and 9.10% had someone living alone who was 65 years of age or older. The average household size was 2.55 and the average family size was 3.00.

In the county, the population was spread out, with 25.50% under the age of 18, 11.60% from 18 to 24, 28.20% from 25 to 44, 21.90% from 45 to 64, and 12.70% who were 65 years of age or older. The median age was 35 years. For every 100 females, there were 96.40 males. For every 100 females age 18 and over, there were 94.10 males.

The median income for a household in the county was $32,069, and the median income for a family was $39,055. Males had a median income of $29,914 versus $19,307 for females. The per capita income for the county was $15,918. About 11.60% of families and 15.20% of the population were below the poverty line, including 18.80% of those under age 18 and 14.00% of those age 65 or over.

== Government ==
=== Government ===
The county government is a constitutional body granted specific powers by the Constitution of Arkansas and the Arkansas Code. The quorum court is the legislative branch of the county government and controls all spending and revenue collection. Representatives are called justices of the peace and are elected from county districts every even-numbered year. The number of districts in a county vary from nine to fifteen, and district boundaries are drawn by the county election commission. The Pope County Quorum Court has thirteen members. Presiding over quorum court meetings is the county judge, who serves as the chief operating officer of the county. The county judge is elected at-large and does not vote in quorum court business, although capable of vetoing quorum court decisions.

Pope County, Arkansas Elected countywide officials
Position	Officeholder	Party
County Judge	Ben Cross	Republican
County Clerk	Pam Ennis	Republican
Circuit Clerk	Rachel Oertling	Republican
Sheriff	Blake Wilson	(Unknown)
Treasurer	Larry L. Holman	Republican
Collector	Jennifer Haley	Republican
Assessor	Dana Baker	Republican
Coroner	Matthew Scott	(Unknown)

The composition of the Quorum Court following the 2024 elections is 13 Republicans. Justices of the Peace (members) of the Quorum Court following the elections are:

- District 1: Phillip Haney (R)
- District 2: Margaret Motley (R)
- District 3: Tim Whittenburg (R)
- District 4: Ronnie Wilbanks (R)
- District 5: Jackie Heflin (R)
- District 6: Suzanne McCall (R)
- District 7: Blake Tarpley (R)
- District 8: Doug Skelton (R)
- District 9: Bill Sparks (R)
- District 10: Jamie Jackson (R)
- District 11: Lane A. Scott (R)
- District 12: Jordan Sowers (R)
- District 13: David Ivy (R)

Additionally, the townships of Pope County are entitled to elect their own respective constables, as set forth by the Constitution of Arkansas. Constables are largely of historical significance as they were used to keep the peace in rural areas when travel was more difficult. The township constables as of the 2024 elections are:

- District 1: Michael Chisum (R)
- District 2: Robert T. Sims (R)
- District 3: Greg Nelson (R)
- District 4: Ricky Parks (R)
- District 5: Alan D. Bradley (R)
- District 6: Jim Bob Jackson (R)
- District 7: Mark Frost (R)

=== Politics ===
Pope County, one part of the Solid South, voted for the Democratic nominee in every election through 1964. In 1968, Richard Nixon became the first Republican to win the county, narrowly beating Democrat Hubert Humphrey and segregationist George Wallace of the American Independent Party. Pope county continued to vote Republican, voting only for fellow southerner Jimmy Carter in 1976 and Arkansas native Bill Clinton in 1996. Over the past few election cycles, Pope County has trended even more heavily towards the GOP. The last Democrat (as of 2024) to carry this county was Bill Clinton in 1996.

United States presidential election results for Pope County, Arkansas
Year	Republican		Democratic		Third party(ies)	
Year	No.	%	No.	%	No.	%
1896	762	24.60%	2,315	74.75%	20	0.65%
1900	835	30.68%	1,871	68.74%	16	0.59%
1904	850	36.64%	1,424	61.38%	46	1.98%
1908	811	31.56%	1,664	64.75%	95	3.70%
1912	334	13.14%	1,517	59.70%	690	27.15%
1916	783	26.71%	2,148	73.29%	0	0.00%
1920	1,120	34.24%	2,082	63.65%	69	2.11%
1924	479	21.23%	1,581	70.08%	196	8.69%
1928	1,559	36.11%	2,735	63.35%	23	0.53%
1932	280	10.36%	2,391	88.49%	31	1.15%
1936	348	11.49%	2,678	88.38%	4	0.13%
1940	770	16.88%	3,765	82.55%	26	0.57%
1944	805	28.14%	2,048	71.58%	8	0.28%
1948	764	20.56%	2,525	67.95%	427	11.49%
1952	2,226	42.27%	3,036	57.65%	4	0.08%
1956	2,267	44.94%	2,753	54.57%	25	0.50%
1960	2,573	46.04%	2,760	49.38%	256	4.58%
1964	2,651	34.07%	4,972	63.91%	157	2.02%
1968	3,319	38.30%	2,578	29.75%	2,769	31.95%
1972	6,917	67.52%	3,302	32.23%	25	0.24%
1976	4,348	34.15%	8,355	65.62%	29	0.23%
1980	7,217	50.72%	6,364	44.72%	649	4.56%
1984	10,667	67.28%	5,082	32.05%	106	0.67%
1988	10,084	66.68%	4,941	32.67%	98	0.65%
1992	8,056	45.10%	7,704	43.13%	2,102	11.77%
1996	8,243	43.75%	8,433	44.76%	2,164	11.49%
2000	11,244	61.04%	6,669	36.20%	509	2.76%
2004	13,614	65.13%	7,100	33.97%	188	0.90%
2008	15,568	70.51%	6,002	27.18%	509	2.31%
2012	14,763	72.23%	5,126	25.08%	550	2.69%
2016	16,256	72.03%	5,000	22.15%	1,313	5.82%
2020	18,081	74.01%	5,772	23.62%	579	2.37%
2024	18,118	74.90%	5,487	22.68%	586	2.42%

== Communities ==
=== Cities ===
- Atkins
- Dover
- London
- Pottsville
- Russellville (county seat)

=== Towns ===
- Hector

=== Census-designated places ===
- Appleton
- Oak Grove

=== Other unincorporated communities ===
- Augsburg
- Nogo
- Smyrna

== Townships ==
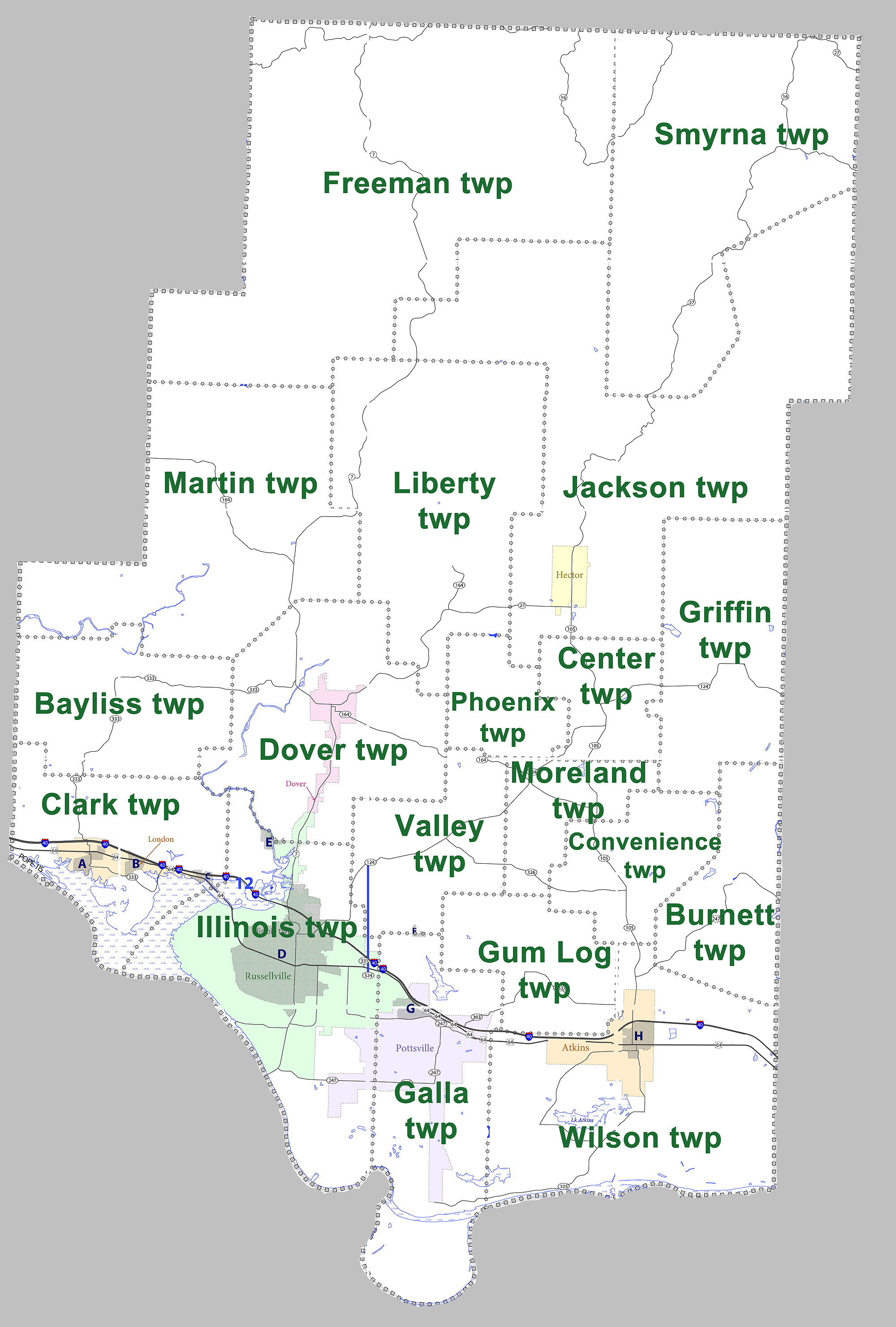
Townships in Pope County, Arkansas as of 2010

Townships in Arkansas are the divisions of a county. Each township includes unincorporated areas; some may have incorporated cities or towns within part of their boundaries. Arkansas townships have limited purposes in modern times. However, the United States census does list Arkansas population based on townships (sometimes referred to as "county subdivisions" or "minor civil divisions"). Townships are also of value for historical purposes in terms of genealogical research. Each town or city is within one or more townships in an Arkansas county based on census maps and publications. The townships of Pope County are listed below; listed in parentheses are the cities, towns, and/or census-designated places that are fully or partially inside the township.

Pope County formerly included 10 more townships. Allen Township was moved into Hogan Township around 1910, and Hill Township, Galla Creek Township, Independence Township, Lee Township, North Fork Township, Sand Spring Township, and Sulphur Township were also formerly active townships in Pope County. Holla Bend Township, containing the Holla Bend National Wildlife Refuge, has also been disbanded.

Township	FIPS code	ANSI code (GNIS ID)	Population center(s)	Pop. (2010)	Pop. density (/mi^{2})	Pop. density (/km^{2})	Land area (mi^{2})	Land area (km^{2})	Water area (mi^{2})	Water area (km^{2})	Geographic coordinates
Bayliss	05-90159	69697		708	24.6	9.5	28.81	74.62	0.0979	0.2536	35°24′10″N 93°14′06″W
Burnett	05-90558	69698		452	20.9	8.1	21.65	56.07	0.1051	0.2722	35°19′10″N 92°52′33″W
Center	05-90735	69699		515	36.8	14.2	13.99	36.23	0.0339	0.0878	35°24′20″N 92°57′16″W
Clark	05-90813	69700	London	2969	115.3	44.6	25.73	66.64	6.0444	15.6549	35°19′45″N 93°14′46″W
Convenience	05-90921	69701		933	50.4	19.4	18.53	47.99	0.0942	0.2440	35°20′00″N 92°56′41″W
Dover	05-91134	69702	Dover	5277	119.1	46.0	44.29	114.7	0.3637	0.9420	35°23′30″N 93°07′01″W
Freeman	05-91377	69703		98	0.8	0.3	119.78	310.2	0.0000	0.0000	35°39′10″N 93°04′06″W
Galla	05-91407	69704	Pottsville	3523	88.7	34.3	39.71	102.8	1.8410	4.7682	35°13′15″N 93°02′46″W
Griffin	05-91536	69705		901	26.5	10.2	33.96	87.96	0.1106	0.2865	35°25′30″N 92°52′36″W
Gum Log	05-91560	69706		1420	71.6	27.6	19.84	51.39	0.0142	0.0368	35°16′30″N 92°59′51″W
Illinois	05-91812	69707	Russellville	25841	540.9	208.9	47.77	123.7	6.6022	17.0996	35°17′00″N 93°07′46″W
Jackson	05-91875	69708	Hector	1191	11.5	4.4	103.72	268.6	0.0505	0.1308	35°29′20″N 92°57′01″W
Liberty	05-92181	69709		805	14.2	5.5	56.64	146.7	0.0028	0.0073	35°29′40″N 93°03′16″W
Martin	05-92415	69710		1482	23.7	9.2	62.46	161.8	0.3931	1.0181	35°28′25″N 93°10′06″W
Moreland	05-92553	69711		700	52.2	20.2	13.40	34.71	0.0683	0.1769	35°21′30″N 92°59′46″W
Phoenix	05-92871	69712		334	26.7	10.3	12.51	32.40	0.0000	0.0000	35°24′30″N 93°00′31″W
Smyrna	05-93420	69713		173	2.4	0.9	70.69	183.1	0.0218	0.0565	35°38′10″N 92°53′46″W
Valley	05-93765	69714		2776	125.7	48.5	22.09	57.21	0.0144	0.0373	35°20′05″N 93°02′46″W
Wilson	05-94089	69715	Atkins	4371	77.6	30.0	56.32	145.9	3.0305	7.8490	35°13′30″N 92°55′01″W
Source: "Census 2000 U.S. Gazetteer Files". U.S. Census Bureau, Geography Division.

== Education ==
School districts in Pope County:

- Atkins School District
- Clinton School District
- Dover School District
- Hector School District
- Lamar School District
- Pottsville School District
- Russellville School District
- Wonderview School District

== See also ==
- List of lakes in Pope County, Arkansas
- National Register of Historic Places listings in Pope County, Arkansas
