= List of places in Arkansas: B =

Arkansas State Seal

This list of current cities, towns, unincorporated communities, and other recognized places in the U.S. state of Arkansas whose name begins with the letter B. It also includes information on the number and names of counties in which the place lies, and its lower and upper zip code bounds, if applicable.

== Cities and Towns ==
Name of place	Number of counties	Principal county	Lower zip code	Upper zip code
Back Gate	1	Desha County	71639	
Bailey	1	Independence County		
Baker	1	Lafayette County		
Baker	1	Searcy County	72650	
Baker	1	Sharp County	72482	
Baker Ford	1	Fulton County		
Baker Hollow	1	Searcy County		
Baker Springs	1	Howard County		
Balch	1	Jackson County	72009	
Bald Knob	1	White County	72010	
Baldwin	1	Jefferson County		
Baldwin	1	Washington County	72701	
Ballard	1	Sharp County	72513	
Band Mill	1	Izard County	72517	
Banks	1	Bradley County	71631	
Banner	1	Cleburne County	72523	
Bannister	1	Saline County		
Banyard	1	Washington County		
Barber	1	Logan County	72927	
Barcelona	1	Crawford County		
Bard	1	Greene County	72450	
Bardstown	1	Mississippi County	72350	
Barfield	1	Mississippi County	72319	
Barham	1	Ouachita County		
Barkada	1	Drew County		
Barling	1	Sebastian County	72923	
Barnes	1	Franklin County	72949	
Barney	1	Faulkner County	72047	
Barrentine Corner	1	White County	72012	
Barringer	1	Clark County	71743	
Barson	1	Woodruff County		
Barton	1	Phillips County	72312	
Barton Junction	1	Phillips County		
Barytes	1	Hot Spring County		
Base Line	1	Pulaski County		
Bashe	1	Sebastian County		
Bass	1	Newton County	72612	
Bassett	1	Mississippi County	72313	
Batavia	1	Boone County	72601	
Bates	1	Scott County	72924	
Batesville	1	Independence County	72501	
Batson	1	Johnson County		
Battlefield	1	Hempstead County		
Baucum	1	Pulaski County	72117	
Bauxite	1	Saline County	72011	
Bauxite Junction	1	Saline County		
Baxter	1	Drew County	71638	
Bay	1	Craighead County	72411	
Bayless	1	Monroe County		
Bayou Meto	1	Arkansas County	72160	
Bayou Metro	1	Lonoke County	72086	
Bay Village	2	Cross County	72324	
Bay Village	2	Poinsett County	72324	
B B Junction	1	Montgomery County		
Beach Grove	1	Franklin County		
Beacon Addition	1	Benton County		
Bear	1	Garland County	71968	
Bear Creek	1	Searcy County	72650	
Bear Creek Springs	1	Boone County	72601	
Bearden	1	Ouachita County	71720	
Bear Hollow Village	1	Sebastian County	72906	
Beasley	1	Poinsett County		
Beaton	1	Hot Spring County		
Beaty	1	Benton County	72736	
Beauchamp	1	Scott County		
Beaudry	1	Garland County	71949	
Beaver	1	Carroll County	72613	
Beaver Shores	1	Benton County		
Beck	1	Crittenden County	72348	
Beck	1	Miller County		
Becton	1	Woodruff County		
Beebe	1	White County	72012	
Bee Branch	1	Van Buren County	72013	
Beech Creek	1	Ashley County	71646	
Beech Grove	1	Dallas County		
Beech Grove	1	Greene County	72412	
Beechwood	1	Newton County		
Beedeville	1	Jackson County	72014	
Beirne	1	Clark County	71721	
Belcher	1	White County		
Belfast	1	Grant County		
Bellaire	1	Chicot County	71638	
Bella Vista	1	Benton County	72714	
Bell City	1	Clay County	72461	
Bellefonte	1	Boone County	72601	
Belle Meade	1	St. Francis County	72348	
Belle Meade Plantation	1	St. Francis County		
Belleville	1	Yell County	72824	
Bells Chapel	1	Pope County	72823	
Bellview	1	Pulaski County		
Bellville	1	Boone County		
Bellville	1	Sevier County	71846	
Belton	1	Hempstead County	71852	
Belview	1	Izard County		
Bemis	1	Woodruff County		
Ben	1	Stone County	72530	
Bend	1	Johnson County		
Bend Ford	1	Searcy County		
Bengall	1	Jackson County	72112	
Ben Gay	1	Sharp County	72569	
Bengel	1	Jackson County	72112	
Ben Hur	1	Newton County	72856	
Ben Lomond	1	Sevier County	71823	
Benton	1	Saline County	72015	
Bentonville	1	Benton County	72712	72714
Bentonville Branch Junction	1	Benton County		
Benzal	1	Arkansas County		
Berea	1	Ashley County	71646	
Berger	1	Pulaski County		
Bergman	1	Boone County	72615	
Berlin	1	Ashley County	71646	
Bernice	1	Pope County	72801	
Bernice Mines	1	Pope County		
Berryville	1	Carroll County	72616	
Bertig	1	Greene County		
Beryl	1	Faulkner County	72032	
Bestwater	1	Benton County		
Bethany	1	Howard County	71833	
Bethel	1	Clark County		
Bethel	1	Columbia County		
Bethel	1	Greene County	72450	
Bethel	1	Pope County		
Bethel Grove	1	Washington County	72730	
Bethel Heights	1	Benton County	72745	
Bethesda	1	Independence County	72501	
Bethlehem	1	Conway County		
Beulah	1	Prairie County	72017	
Beverage Town	1	Van Buren County	72030	
Bexar	1	Fulton County	72515	
Biddle	1	Pulaski County		
Bidville	1	Crawford County	72959	
Big Creek Corner	1	Lee County		
Bigelow	1	Perry County	72016	
Bigflat	1	Baxter County	72650	
Big Flat	2	Baxter County	72617	
Big Flat	2	Searcy County	72617	
Big Fork	1	Polk County	71953	
Biggers	1	Randolph County	72413	
Big Hill	1	Calhoun County		
Big Lake	1	Mississippi County	72442	
Big Rock	1	Pulaski County		
Big Rock	1	Sebastian County		
Big Spring Mill	1	Independence County		
Big Springs	1	Stone County	72560	
Billingsleys Corner	1	Little River County	71866	
Billstown	1	Pike County	71958	
Bingen	1	Hempstead County	71852	
Birchwood	1	Pulaski County		
Birdell	1	Randolph County		
Birdeye	1	Cross County	72314	
Birds Mill	1	Montgomery County		
Birdsong	1	Mississippi County	72386	
Birdtown	1	Conway County	72157	
Birmac	1	Jefferson County		
Birta	1	Yell County	72853	
Biscoe	1	Prairie County	72017	
Bismarck	1	Hot Spring County	71929	
Blackburn	1	Washington County	72959	
Black Diamond	1	Miller County		
Blackfish	1	St. Francis County	72346	
Black Fork	1	Scott County	71953	
Black Jack	1	Greene County		
Blackland	1	Little River County	71836	
Black Oak	1	Craighead County	72414	
Black Oak	1	Poinsett County	72386	
Black Oak	1	Washington County	72701	
Black Rock	1	Lawrence County	72415	
Black Springs	1	Montgomery County	71930	
Blackton	1	Monroe County	72069	
Blackville	1	Conway County		
Blackville	1	Jackson County	72112	
Blackwell	1	Conway County	72019	
Blakely	1	Garland County	71931	
Blakemore	1	Lonoke County	72046	
Blanchard Springs	1	Union County	71749	
Blanco	1	Searcy County		
Blansett	1	Scott County	71953	
Blanton	1	Crittenden County		
Blanville	1	Sharp County	72532	
Bledsoe	1	Lee County		
Blevins	1	Hempstead County	71825	
Bloomer	1	Sebastian County	72933	
Bloomfield	1	Benton County		
Blossom	1	St. Francis County	72392	
Blue Ball	1	Scott County	72866	
Blue Bayou	1	Howard County		
Blue Eye	1	Carroll County	65611	
Blue Hill	1	Pulaski County	72118	
Blue Mountain	1	Logan County	72826	
Blue Springs	1	Garland County	71901	
Bluff City	1	Nevada County	71722	
Bluffton	1	Yell County	72827	
Blytheville	1	Mississippi County	72315	
Blytheville Air Force Base	1	Mississippi County	72315	
Blytheville Junction	1	Mississippi County	72319	
Board Camp	1	Polk County	71932	
Boat Run	1	Poinsett County		
Bodcaw	1	Nevada County	71858	
Boeuf	1	Chicot County		
Boggy	1	Miller County		
Bog Springs	1	Polk County		
Bolding	1	Union County	71747	
Boles	1	Scott County	72926	
Bonair	1	St. Francis County		
Bonanza	1	Sebastian County	72916	
Bondsville	1	Mississippi County	72354	
Bonnerdale	1	Hot Spring County	71933	
Bono	1	Craighead County	72416	
Bono	1	Faulkner County	72058	
Booker	1	Crittenden County		
Booker	1	Pulaski County	72117	
Boone	1	Boone County		
Boone County Airport	1	Boone County	72601	
Booneville	1	Logan County	72927	
Booster	1	Searcy County	72645	
Boothe	1	Scott County	72927	
Boston	1	Madison County	72752	
Boswell	1	Clark County		
Boswell	1	Izard County	72516	
Botkinburg	1	Van Buren County	72031	
Boueff	1	Chicot County	71640	
Boughton	1	Nevada County	71857	
Bovine	1	Ashley County	71646	
Bowen	1	Pike County	71940	
Bowman	1	Chicot County		
Bowman	1	Craighead County	72437	
Boxelder	1	Mississippi County	72438	
Boxley	1	Newton County	72742	
Box Springs	1	Columbia County		
Boyd	1	Lafayette County	71845	
Boyd	1	Miller County	71837	
Boydell	1	Ashley County	71658	
Boyd Hill	1	Lafayette County		
Boydsville	1	Clay County	72461	
Boynton	1	Mississippi County	72438	
Bradford	1	White County	72020	
Bradley	1	Lafayette County	71826	
Bradley Quarters	1	Bradley County	71671	
Brady	1	Pulaski County	72205	
Bragg City	1	Ouachita County	71726	
Braggs	1	Crittenden County		
Brakebill	1	Randolph County		
Branch	1	Franklin County	72928	
Branchville	1	Lincoln County		
Brandon	1	Drew County		
Brannon	1	Madison County		
Brasfield	1	Prairie County	72017	
Brashears	1	Madison County	72721	
Brawley	1	Scott County		
Breckenridge	1	Pulaski County		
Bredlow Corner	1	Pulaski County	72046	
Brentwood	1	Washington County	72959	
Brewer	1	Cleburne County	72044	
Briar	1	Howard County		
Briarcliff	1	Baxter County	72653	
Briark	1	Crittenden County		
Briarwood	1	Pulaski County		
Brice	1	Crittenden County		
Brickeys	1	Lee County	72320	
Bridge Junction	1	Crittenden County		
Briggsville	1	Yell County	72828	
Brighton	1	Greene County	72450	
Bright Star	1	Howard County	71851	
Brightstar	1	Miller County	71834	
Brightwater	1	Benton County	72756	
Brinkley	1	Monroe County	72021	
Brister	1	Columbia County	71740	
Brittain	1	Pulaski County		
Broad	1	Bradley County		
Brockett	1	Randolph County	72455	
Brockwell	1	Izard County	72517	
Brookings	1	Clay County	72453	
Brookland	1	Craighead County	72417	
Brooks	1	Saline County		
Brown	1	Mississippi County	72442	
Brown Ford	1	Fulton County		
Browns	1	Crittenden County		
Brown Springs	1	Hot Spring County	72104	
Brownstown	1	Sevier County	71846	
Brownsville	1	Cleburne County		
Bruins	1	Crittenden County	72348	
Bruins Landing	1	Crittenden County	72348	
Brumley	1	Faulkner County	72032	
Brummitt	1	Lonoke County	72160	
Bruno	1	Marion County	72618	
Brush Creek	1	Grant County	72084	
Brushey Lake	1	Poinsett County		
Brutonville	1	Jackson County	72479	
Bryant	1	Independence County		
Bryant	1	Saline County	72022	
Brymar	1	Mississippi County	72370	
Buckeye	1	Madison County		
Buckeye	1	Mississippi County	72438	
Buckhorn	1	Montgomery County		
Buckner	1	Lafayette County	71827	
Buck Range	1	Howard County	71851	
Bucks Landing	1	Prairie County		
Bucksnort	1	Dallas County		
Buckville	1	Garland County	71956	
Buell	1	Sebastian County		
Buena Vista	1	Ouachita County	71764	
Buffalo	1	Baxter County		
Buffalo City	1	Baxter County	72653	
Buffalo National River	4	Baxter County	72601	
Buffalo National River	4	Marion County	72601	
Buffalo National River	4	Newton County	72601	
Buffalo National River	4	Searcy County	72601	
Buford	1	Baxter County		
Buie	1	Grant County	72129	
Bullfrog Valley	1	Pope County	72837	
Bull Shoals	1	Marion County	72619	
Bulltown	1	Woodruff County		
Bunker Hill	1	Perry County		
Bunn	1	Dallas County		
Bunney	1	Craighead County	72414	
Burdette	1	Mississippi County	72321	
Burg	1	Howard County	71833	
Burks	1	Arkansas County		
Burlington	1	Boone County	72601	
Burma	1	Sebastian County	72940	
Burnt Hill	1	Craighead County		
Burnville	1	Sebastian County	72936	
Burton	1	Mississippi County		
Burton Mill	1	Lafayette County	71839	
Burtsell	1	Clark County		
Busch	1	Carroll County	72632	
Bussey	1	Columbia County	71860	
Butler	1	Mississippi County	72370	
Butlerville	1	Lonoke County	72176	
Butterfield	1	Hot Spring County	72104	
Buttermilk	1	Pope County		
Byran	1	Scott County		
Byron	1	Fulton County	72576	

== Townships ==
Name of place	Number of counties	Principal county	Lower zip code	Upper zip code
Bahannan Township	1	Madison County		
Bain Township	1	Garland County		
Baker Township	1	Izard County		
Baker Township	1	Lafayette County		
Baker Township	1	Randolph County		
Bald Knob Township	1	White County		
Ball Township	1	Benton County		
Banner Township	1	Ashley County		
Banner Township	1	Saline County		
Barber Township	1	Logan County		
Barham Township	1	Franklin County		
Barnes Township	1	Woodruff County		
Barnett Township	1	Van Buren County		
Barraque Township	1	Jefferson County	72079	72132
Barren Township	1	Independence County		
Barren Township	1	Jackson County		
Barren Fork Township	1	Izard County		
Bartholomew Township	1	Drew County		
Bartholomew Township	1	Lincoln County		
Barton Township	1	Arkansas County		
Bass Little Township	1	Sebastian County		
Batavia Township	1	Boone County		
Bateman Township	1	Jackson County		
Batson Township	1	Johnson County		
Bauxite Township	1	Saline County		
Baxter Township	1	Garland County		
Bayliss Township	1	Pope County		
Bayou Township	1	Ashley County		
Bayou Township	1	Baxter County		
Bayou Meto Township	1	Arkansas County		
Bear Creek Township	1	Lee County		
Bear Creek Township	1	Searcy County		
Bear Creek Township	1	Sevier County		
Bear Creek No. 4 Township	1	Searcy County		
Bear Creek No. 5 Township	1	Searcy County		
Bear Creek No. 6 Township	1	Searcy County		
Bearden Township	1	Marion County		
Bearhouse Township	1	Ashley County		
Bearhouse Township	1	Drew County		
Bear Wallow Township	1	Logan County		
Beatie Township	1	Benton County		
Beaver Township	1	Carroll County		
Beaver Township	1	Saline County		
Beaver Township	1	Searcy County		
Bedford Township	1	Cross County		
Beech Township	1	Miller County		
Beech Creek Township	1	Ashley County		
Behestian Township	1	Ouachita County		
Belcher Township	1	Prairie County		
Bellefonte Township	1	Boone County		
Bellmore Township	1	Stone County		
Benedict Township	1	Faulkner County		
Ben Lomond Township	1	Sevier County		
Bennett Township	1	Clay County		
Bennett Bayou Township	1	Fulton County		
Bentley Township	1	Conway County		
Benton Township	1	Faulkner County		
Benton Township	1	Fulton County		
Bethesda Township	1	Ouachita County		
Beverly Township	1	Sebastian County		
Bidville Township	1	Crawford County		
Big Bottom Township	1	Independence County		
Big Bottom-Wycough-Logan Township	1	Independence County		
Big Creek Township	1	Cleburne County		
Big Creek Township	1	Craighead County		
Big Creek Township	1	Fulton County		
Big Creek Township	1	Hot Spring County		
Big Creek Township	1	Lee County		
Big Creek Township	1	Marion County		
Big Creek Township	1	Newton County		
Big Creek Township	1	Phillips County		
Big Creek Township	1	Searcy County		
Big Creek Township	1	Sebastian County		
Big Creek Township	1	Sharp County		
Big Creek Township	1	White County		
Big Flat Township	1	Baxter County		
Big Fork Township	1	Montgomery County		
Big Fork Township	1	Polk County		
Big Lake Township	1	Mississippi County		
Big Rock Township	1	Pulaski County		
Big Spring Township	1	Benton County		
Big Spring Township	1	Izard County		
Big Springs Township	1	Marion County		
Bird Township	1	Conway County		
Bird Township	1	Jackson County		
Bismarck Township	1	Hot Spring County		
Black Fish Township	1	St. Francis County		
Black Fork Township	1	Scott County		
Blackland Township	1	Howard County		
Black Oak Township	1	Craighead County		
Black Oak Township	1	Crittenden County		
Black Oak Township	1	Franklin County		
Black River Township	1	Independence County		
Black River Township	1	Lawrence County		
Black River-Marshall Township	1	Independence County		
Black Rock Township	1	Lawrence County		
Black Springs Township	1	Montgomery County		
Blansett Township	1	Scott County		
Bloomer Township	1	Sebastian County		
Blue Bayou Township	1	Howard County		
Blue Cane Township	1	Clay County		
Blue Cane Township	1	Greene County		
Blue Mountain Township	1	Logan County		
Blue Mountain Township	1	Stone County		
Blue Ridge Township	1	Howard County		
Bluffton Township	1	Yell County		
Blythe Township	1	Boone County		
Blythe Township	1	Marion County		
Boas Township	1	Lawrence County		
Bob Ward Township	1	Crittenden County		
Bodcaw Township	1	Hempstead County		
Bogy Township	1	Jefferson County	72004	72175
Bohannon Township	1	Madison County		
Bois d'Arc Township	1	Hempstead County		
Bolivar Township	1	Jefferson County		
Bolivar Township	1	Poinsett County		
Boone Township	1	Logan County		
Boone Township	1	Union County		
Boston Township	1	Franklin County		
Boston Township	1	Madison County		
Boston Township	1	Newton County		
Boston Township	1	Washington County		
Boughton Township	1	Nevada County		
Bowen Township	1	Madison County		
Bowen Township	1	Mississippi County		
Bowie Township	1	Chicot County		
Bowie Township	1	Desha County		
Bowman Township	1	Cleveland County		
Bradley Township	1	Ouachita County		
Bradley Township	1	Van Buren County		
Bradshaw Township	1	Clay County		
Bragg Township	1	Ouachita County		
Brawley Township	1	Scott County		
Breckenridge Township	1	Greene County		
Breckenridge Township	1	Jackson County		
Brewer Township	1	Arkansas County		
Brewer Township	1	Howard County		
Brewer Township	1	Pike County		
Bridge Creek Township	1	Ouachita County		
Briggsville Township	1	Yell County		
Brightwater Township	1	Benton County		
Brinkley Township	1	Monroe County		
Bristol Township	1	Faulkner County		
Bristow Township	1	Randolph County		
Brookland Township	1	Craighead County		
Brown Township	1	Clay County		
Brown Township	1	Monroe County		
Brown Springs Township	1	Hot Spring County		
Brush Creek Township	1	Washington County		
Brushy Lake Township	1	Cross County		
Bryan Township	1	Boone County		
Bryan Township	1	Greene County		
Bryan Township	1	Izard County		
Bryan Township	1	Jackson County		
Bryan Township	1	Stone County		
Bryant Township	1	Saline County		
Buckhorn Township	1	Baxter County		
Buckhorn Township	1	Sevier County		
Buck Range Township	1	Howard County		
Buffalo Township	1	Craighead County		
Buffalo Township	1	Marion County		
Buford Township	1	Baxter County		
Bullard Township	1	Prairie County		
Bunn Township	1	Dallas County		
Burdette Township	1	Mississippi County		
Burg Township	1	Howard County		
Burke Township	1	Little River County		
Burnett Township	1	Pope County		
Butler Township	1	Lonoke County		
Butler Township	1	Randolph County		
Butterfield Township	1	Hot Spring County		
