= List of ghost towns in Arkansas =

This is an incomplete list of ghost towns in Arkansas, United States.

== Classification ==
=== Barren site ===
- Sites no longer in existence
- Sites that have been destroyed
- Covered with water
- Reverted to pasture
- May have a few difficult to find foundations/footings at most

=== Neglected site ===
- Only rubble left
- Roofless building ruins
- Buildings or houses still standing, but majority are roofless

=== Abandoned site ===
- Building or houses still standing
- Buildings and houses all abandoned
- No population, except caretaker
- Site no longer in existence except for one or two buildings, for example old church, grocery store

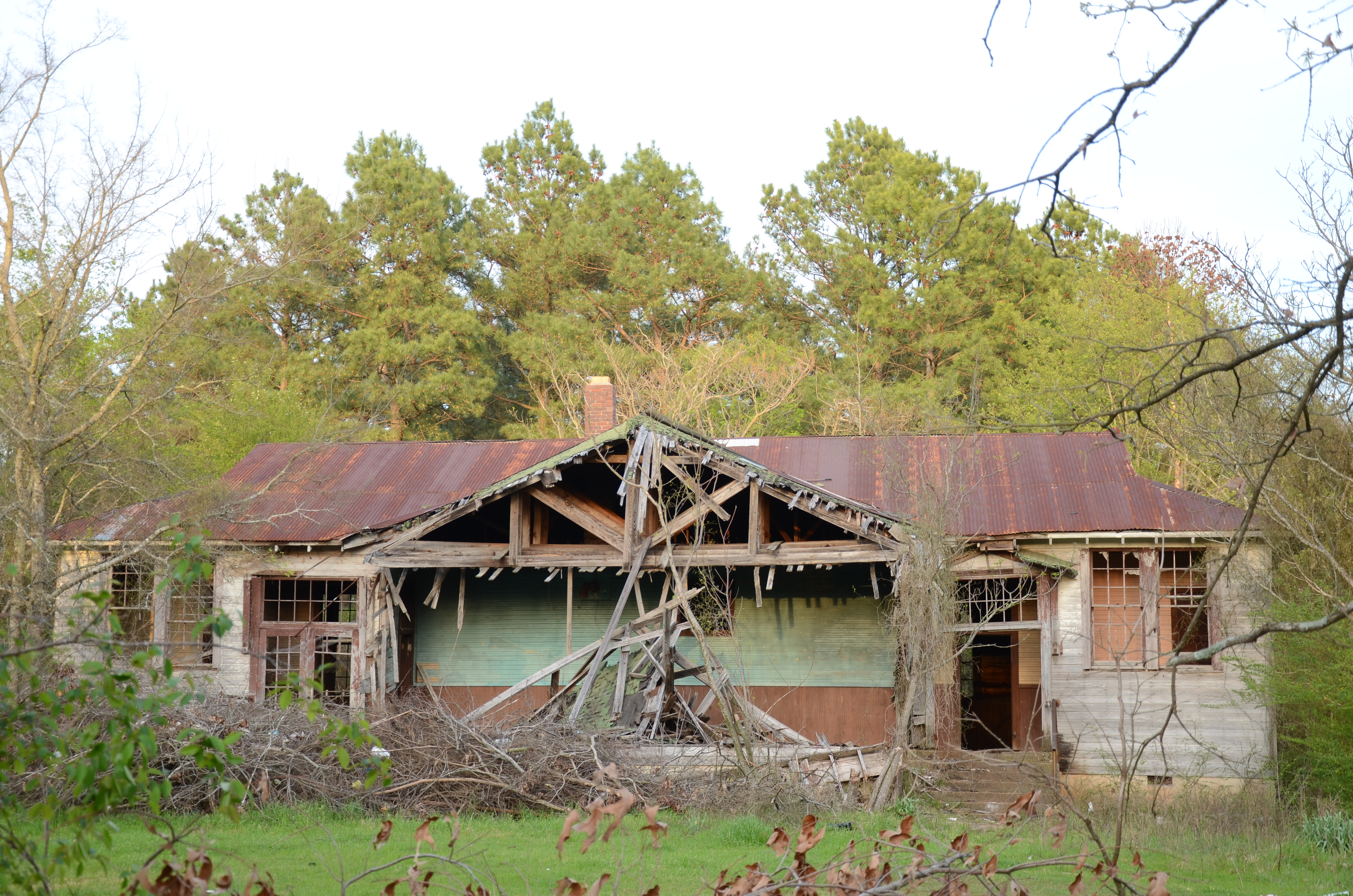
The school at Oak Grove, which is still inhabited by 386 residents

=== Semi-abandoned site ===
- Building or houses still standing
- Buildings and houses largely abandoned
- Few residents
- Many abandoned buildings
- Small population

=== Historic community ===
- Building or houses still standing
- Still a busy community
- Smaller than its boom years
- Population has decreased dramatically, to one fifth or less

== Table ==
Town name	Other names	County	Established	Disestablished	Current status	Remarks
Allis		Drew				Contains Saline Cemetery, which is listed on the National Register of Historic Places
Anderson Flat		Independence				
Anna		Crawford				
Arkansas Post		Arkansas	1686	1863	Barren site, protected area	
Armada		Crawford				
Austin	Old Austin	Lonoke				The original site has since been abandoned.
Barbara		Washington				
Bartholomew		Drew				
Bear City		Garland	1882		Mostly woods and a few houses, some active. Small population, but has regained interest in recent years with new constructions and more people moving in.	Written about by Donald Harrington and his wife in their book Let us Build Us a City. Bear City is on the road to Brady Mountain on Lake Ouachita.
Bernice		Pope				
Bingen	Previously called Ozan (not to be confused with nearby Ozan)	Hempstead			Semi-abandoned, several houses remain	
Blanchard Springs		Union				A former resort town.
Blansett		Scott				
Blewford		Washington				
Bolding		Union				
Brownsville		Lonoke				Once the county seat of Prairie County before it became part of Lonoke County.
Bruno		Marion				
Cadron	Cadron Settlement	Faulkner				The first permanent white settlement in Arkansas.
Carrollton		Carroll			Historic	
Carter	Carter's Store, Carter Store, Hicks	Washington				
Chalk Bluff		Clay				
Champagnolle	Champagnolle Landing, Scarborough Landing, Union Courthouse	Union				
Cow Mound		Woodruff				
Credit		Craighead				
Crossroads		Pulaski		1957	Submerged in Lake Maumelle	Town and Cemetery under water. Located Hwy 10/Hwy 113.
Daleville		Clark	1880s			Currently the site of The Daily Lumber Company
Davidsonville		Randolph				Now a historic state park.
Denver		Carroll				
Dodd City		Marion				
Dubuque			1814		Submerged	Submerged beneath Bull Shoals Lake
East Calico Rock		Izard				Contained within the city limits of current Calico Rock, was known as a rough part of town.
Eldorado Springs	Eldorado	Benton				
Eros		Marion				School listed on the National Register of Historic Places.
Eunice		Chicot			Barren	Burned down by the Union Army in 1863.
Forester		Scott				
Four Gum Corner		St. Francis			Mostly farm land now.	
Frenchtown		Fulton				
Frog Level	Froggy Level	Columbia				
Gaskins		Carroll				
Gate		Scott				
Gobbler	Gobbler's Point	Carroll				
Golden City		Logan				
Graysonia		Clark	1902	1951	Ruins	Shipped the first flask of Arkansas cinnabar in 1932.
Greensboro		Craighead				
Harness		Stone				
Hix's Ferry		Randolph	1800			
Hopefield		Crittenden				
Kimberly		Pike	1908	1911	Incorporated into Murfreesboro	
Kingdon Springs					Submerged	Flooded by Bull Shoals Lake.
Lancaster		Crawford				
Laynesport		Little River				
Lewisburg		Conway	1831	1883		Was the county seat of Conway County until 1883.
Marianna		Lee		1857		The original townsite was abandoned and moved further south in 1857.
Mauldin		Montegomery	1918			
Mcguire		Washington				
Midway		Howard				
Moko		Marion				
Monte Ne		Benton	1901	1932	Submerged in Beaver Lake	
Moscow		Nevada	1810	1873	Only Moscow Methodist Church and Cemetery remain	Economic displacement by Cairo and Fulton Railroad.
Mount Olive		Howard				
Mount Tabor			1854	1930s	Abandoned. The church remains.	A small farming community.
Napoleon		Desha			Submerged	Was once the county seat of Desha County.
Nebraska		Scott	1854	1907		
Oak Grove		Carroll			Semi-abandoned	
Old Austin	Oakland Grove, Oakland, Saundersville, Atlanta	Lonoke				Declined after being bypassed by the railroad.
Oregon		Boone		1896		
Osage	Fairview	Carroll				
Paraclifta		Sevier				
Pinnacle Springs		Faulkner		1891	Barren	
Racket Ridge		Van Buren				
Richmond		Little River				
Rondo		Miller				
Rush		Marion	1880	1940	Ruins	A zinc mining region of the Ozark Mountains in Arkansas
Scotia		Pope				
Sensation		Scott				
Sexton	Salem Springs	Washington				
Sneed		Jackson		1929	Barren site	Was destroyed by Arkansas' only F5 tornado on April 10, 1929.
Sub Rosa		Franklin		1911		
Tinsman		Calhoun				
Violett		Arkansas			Barren site	
Weathers		Madison			Abandoned site	Remains of old store/post office and old well are all that remain.
Winona Springs		Carroll				
Wittsburg		Cross				
Zinc		Marion				

== Gallery ==
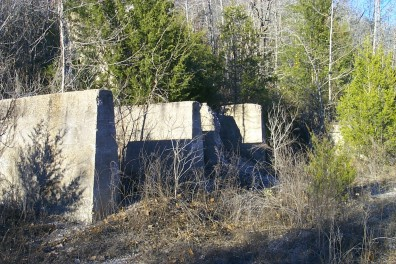
Ruins of the New White Eagle Mill, Rush Historic District, Buffalo National River, Arkansas

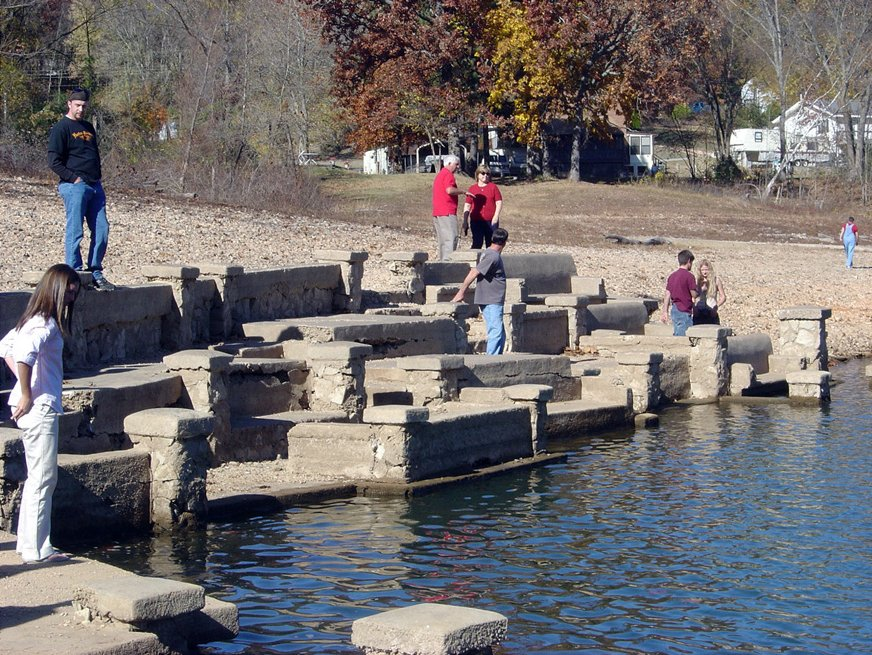
The partially submerged Monte Ne Amphitheater in Monte Ne, Arkansas

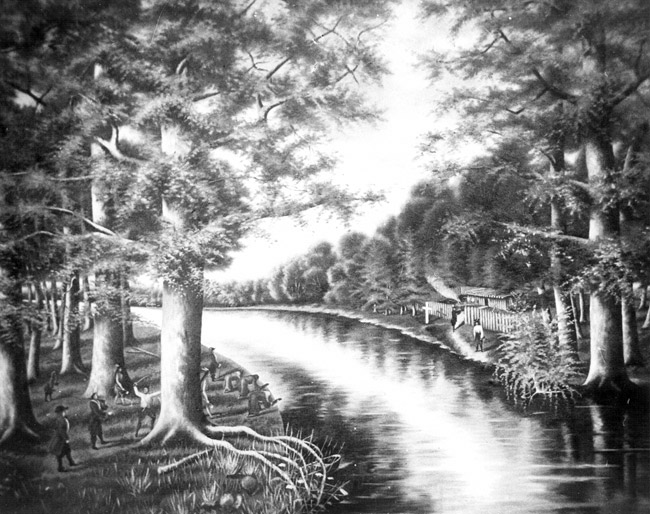
An illustration of Arkansas Post, Arkansas, depicting the settlement in 1689. This was painted in 1904.

== See also ==
- Dogpatch USA, an abandoned theme park in the northwest part of the state.
- Booger Hollow, Arkansas, an abandoned tourist attraction
