= Baker Township, Arkansas =

Baker Township, Arkansas may refer to:

- Baker Township, Izard County, Arkansas
- Baker Township, Lafayette County, Arkansas
- Baker Township, Randolph County, Arkansas

== See also ==
- List of townships in Arkansas
- Baker Township (disambiguation)
