= Banner Township, Arkansas =

Banner Township, Arkansas may refer to:

- Banner Township, Ashley County, Arkansas
- Banner Township, Saline County, Arkansas

== See also ==
- List of townships in Arkansas
- Banner Township (disambiguation)
