= Barren Township, Arkansas =

Barren Township, Arkansas may refer to:

- Barren Township, Independence County, Arkansas
- Barren Township, Jackson County, Arkansas

== See also ==
- List of townships in Arkansas
- Barren Township (disambiguation)
