= Banner Township, Illinois =

Banner Township, Illinois refers to one of the following places:

- Banner Township, Effingham County, Illinois
- Banner Township, Fulton County, Illinois

See also

- Banner Township (disambiguation)
