= Buttermilk (disambiguation) =

Buttermilk is a type of liquid dairy product, but can also refer to:

== Animals ==
- Buttermilk (horse) (1941–1972), appeared in numerous American Western films with cowgirl star Dale Evans
- Buttermilk Sky, Nigerian Dwarf goat and 2012 Internet viral video sensation

== Music ==
- "Buttermilk" was a single by Sly Stone, released on the Autumn records label in 1965
- "Ole Buttermilk Sky" a song covered by The Page Boys

== Places in the United States ==
- Buttermilk, Arkansas
- Buttermilk, Kansas
- Buttermilk, Missouri
- Buttermilk Channel, New York
- Buttermilk (ski area), part of the Aspen/Snowmass resort complex in Colorado
- The Buttermilks, also known as the Buttermilk country, near Bishop, California
