= Baker Township, Kansas =

Baker Township, Kansas may refer to:

- Baker Township, Crawford County, Kansas
- Baker Township, Gove County, Kansas

== See also ==
- List of Kansas townships
- Baker Township (disambiguation)
