= Baker Township =

Baker Township may refer to:

- Baker Township, Izard County, Arkansas
- Baker Township, Lafayette County, Arkansas
- Baker Township, Randolph County, Arkansas
- Baker Township, Morgan County, Indiana
- Baker Township, Guthrie County, Iowa
- Baker Township, O'Brien County, Iowa
- Baker Township, Osceola County, Iowa
- Baker Township, Crawford County, Kansas
- Baker Township, Gove County, Kansas
- Baker Township, Stevens County, Minnesota
- Baker Township, Whatcom County, Washington (historical name for Township 38 North, Range 05 East)
