= Bartholomew Township, Arkansas =

Bartholomew Township, Arkansas may refer to:

- Bartholomew Township, Drew County, Arkansas
- Bartholomew Township, Lincoln County, Arkansas

== See also ==
- List of townships in Arkansas
