= Vern Williams =

Vern Williams (born Delbert Lavern Williams) (December 9, 1930 – June 6, 2006) was a singer and mandolin player who was instrumental in introducing bluegrass music to the West Coast of the United States.

== Early life ==
Williams was born on December 9, 1930, in Newton County, Arkansas (or Bullfrog Valley, Pope County, Arkansas), as part of a musical family; family members (such as brothers Junior and Hairl Dean) played fiddle, guitar, and banjo. Williams started on guitar, then switched to mandolin at age 17. In 1952, he was drafted into the United States Marine Corps and moved to San Diego, California, for basic training. After serving at Twentynine Palms, California, he married Marjory Vogler and moved to Stockton, California.

== Vern and Ray ==
In 1960, Williams formed a duo with fiddler Ray Park known as Vern and Ray. Vern and Ray became one of the most successful bluegrass bands in Northern California. According to DJ Tom Diamant, "Anybody who plays bluegrass in the Bay area and sings the tenor part has been influenced by Vern Williams. He was one of the greatest tenor singers in history"

Vern and Ray recorded one studio album, Sounds From the Ozarks, on the Old Homestead label, which is now considered a collector's item. The duo broke up in 1974.

== Vern Williams Band ==
After the breakup of Vern and Ray, Williams formed the Vern Williams Band, which featured his son Delbert on guitar, fiddler Ed Neff and singer and banjoist Keith Little. The band became known as a "powerhouse bluegrass outfit". In 1980, they signed with Rounder Records and, shortly afterwards, recorded Bluegrass from the Gold Country which is now considered a bluegrass classic. The Vern Williams Band also backed up country music legend Rose Maddox in her latter recordings. The band broke up in 1986.

== Legacy ==
Over the years, Williams worked with many younger musicians, both in Vern and Ray, and within the Vern Williams Band, who went on to successful careers of their own including Jerry Garcia, Herb Pedersen, Laurie Lewis, Pete Wernick, Sandy Rothman, and Rick Shubb. Lewis said of her time with the Vern Williams Band, "I was in heaven, with the best seat in the house for that scraped-clean, unvarnished sound" and "Playing with them ... has always been among the highlights of my musical career."

In 1997, Williams was awarded a Distinguished Achievement Award from the International Bluegrass Music Association’s (IBMA), and he was the first to be awarded an Honorary Lifetime Membership in the California Bluegrass Association.

Williams died in 2006 in San Andreas, California.

== Discography ==
- Sounds From the Ozarks, Vern and Ray, Old Homestead Records, 1974
- Vern & Ray With Herb Pedersen - San Francisco, Arhoolie Records, 1968
- Bluegrass from the Gold Country, The Vern Williams Band, Rounder Records, 1981
- This Is Rose Maddox, Rose Maddox with The Vern Williams Band, Arhoolie Records, 1981
- A Beautiful Bouquet, Rose Maddox with The Vern Williams Band, Arhoolie Records, 1983
- Traditional Bluegrass, The Vern Williams Band, Arhoolie Records, 2004
