= Banner Township, Kansas =

Banner Township, Kansas may refer to the following places in Kansas:

- Banner Township, Dickinson County, Kansas
- Banner Township, Jackson County, Kansas
- Banner Township, Rush County, Kansas
- Banner Township, Smith County, Kansas
- Banner Township, Stevens County, Kansas

== See also ==
- List of Kansas townships
- Banner Township (disambiguation)
