= Sensation =

Sensation (psychology) refers to the processing of the senses by the sensory system.

Sensation or sensations may also refer to:

== In arts and entertainment ==
=== In literature ===
- Sensation (fiction), a fiction writing mode
- Sensation novel, a British literary genre
- Sensation Comics, a comic book series

=== In film and television ===
- Sensation (2021 film), a British mystery thriller film
- Sensation (1936 film), a British crime film
- Sensations of 1945, a 1944 American musical-comedy film
- Sensations (film), a 1975 pornographic film
- Sensation, a 1995 film starring Kari Wührer

=== In music and dance ===
- Sensations, a sub-group of Hey! Say! JUMP
- "Sensation" (song), by The Who
- "Sensations" (Alphaville song), a song by German band Alphaville
- Sensation (Anúna album), released in 2006
- Sensation (Aishah and The Fan Club album), released in 1988
- The Sensations, an American musical R&B/pop quartet of the 1950s and early 1960s
- Sensation (event), an indoor dance event which originated from the Netherlands
- SENSATION (music project), a band and a label formed by the Malaysian-Chinese singer-songwriter Gary Chaw

=== Other uses in arts and entertainment ===
- Sensation (art exhibition), a controversial British art exhibition

== In science and technology ==
- Aeroflying Sensation, a French ultralight aircraft
- HTC Sensation, a HTC mobile phone
- Sensation Science Centre, a science centre in Dundee, Scotland

== Businesses ==
- Sensation Animation, a subsidiary group of The Walt Disney Company
- Sensation Lawn Mowers, a defunct manufacturer of lawn mowers and lawn equipment

== Other uses ==
- Sensation (mango), a mango cultivar that originated in south Florida
- Sensation (ship), Carnival Cruise Line ship
- Sensation, Arkansas, a ghost town
- Sensation play (BDSM), a term in sexual culture
- Walkers Sensations, a type of potato crisp
- Vedana, the Buddhist concept of sensation

== See also ==
- Sense
- Sensationalism
- Sensory (disambiguation)
- Sensuality (disambiguation)
