= White Rock Wildlife Management Area =

Protected area in Arkansas, United States

- IUCN category V (protected landscape/seascape)

- Location within Arkansas
- Location: Crawford County, Franklin County, Johnson County, Madison County, Newton County, Arkansas, Washington County, Arkansas
- Coordinates: 35°42′3″N 93°56′13″W
- Area: 280,000 acres (1,100 km^{2})
- Established: 1976
- Operator: Arkansas Game and Fish Commission
- Owner: United States Forest Service
- Website: https://www.agfc.com/en/zone-map/781/

The White Rock Wildlife Management Area (WMA) was designated in 1976 as 280,000 acres (110,000 ha) of protected area within the boundaries of the Ozark National Forest. The WMA is owned by the U. S. Forest Service and managed under the provisions of a Memorandum of Understanding by the Arkansas Game and Fish Commission, and is situated in the Boston Mountains of Northwest Arkansas.

== Description ==
The Mulberry River runs through the southern part of the WMA. Access areas include Big Eddy, Campbell Cemetery, High Bank, Indian Creek, Little Mulberry Creek, Redding Recreation Area, Turner Bend, and Wolf Pen Recreation Area.

Two reservoirs, Shores Lake and Horsehead Lake, are located within the WMA, with Lake Fort Smith adjacent to the west. Fishing, hunting, trapping, and recreational activities such as canoeing, hiking, and observing fauna and viewing flora . Wildlife includes squirrels, deer, wild turkeys, black bears and fur-bearers. There are camping, picnic and swimming areas throughout the WMA. There are six districts in the WMA.

The Pig Trail Scenic Byway runs from Brashears through Cass and south towards Interstate 49. Cass was an old sawmill town from 1915 to 1926 when the Black Mountain and Eastern Railroad ran from Combs to Cass.

The WMA is crossed east-west by the Ozark Highlands Trail.

== Communities ==
- Bidville
