= Birdtown (disambiguation) =

Birdtown is a neighborhood near Cleveland, Ohio, United States.

Birdtown or Bird town may also refer to:

- Birdtown, Arkansas, a community in Arkansas, U.S.
- Bird Town, an American racehorse and broodmare
- "Birdtown," a municipal conservation program often organized by state Audubon societies
- Robbinsdale, Minnesota, given the nickname "Birdtown" by its residents
