= Black Fork =

Black Fork may refer to:

- Black Fork, Arkansas, an unincorporated community
- Black Fork (Cheat River) in West Virginia
- Black Fork Mohican River in Ohio
