= Credit (disambiguation) =

Credit refers to any form of deferred payment, the granting of a loan and the creation of debt.

Credit may also refer to:

== Places ==
- Credit, Arkansas, a ghost town
- Credit River, a river in Ontario, Canada
- Credit River (Minnesota), a river in the United States
- Credit River, Minnesota, a city in the United States

== Arts, entertainment, and media ==
- Credit (creative arts), acknowledging the ideas or other work of writers and contributors
  - Closing credits, a list of credits played at the ending of a work
  - Motion picture credits
  - Opening credits, a list of credits played at the beginning of a work
- Credit (science fiction), a form of currency in some fictional works
- "Credit", a song on Meghan Trainor's 2015 album Title
- Game credit, a count of the current number of games that can be played in arcade games and pinball

== Finance and accounting ==
- Credit bureau
- Credit card
- Credit line (disambiguation)
- Credit rating, an assessment of credit worthiness
- Credit risk, the risk of default on a debt
- Credit score, a representation of credit worthiness
- Debits and credits, types of bookkeeping entries
- Line of credit

== Other uses ==
- Course credit, a system of measuring academic coursework
- Contributor Roles Taxonomy (CRediT), a controlled vocabulary of types of contributions to a research project

== See also ==
- Accreditation
- Credibility
