= Arkansas Highway 187 =

Highway in Arkansas, United States

Highway 187

Route information
- Maintained by ArDOT
- Length: 16.57 mi (26.67 km)

Major junctions
- From: AR 23
- US 62, Busch
- To: US 62

Location
- Country: United States
- State: Arkansas
- Counties: Carroll

Highway system
- Arkansas Highway System; Interstate; US; State; Business; Spurs; Suffixed; Scenic; Heritage
← AR 186	→ AR 188

Arkansas Highway 187 (AR 187 and Hwy. 187) is a roughly three–quarter loop state highway in Carroll County, Arkansas. The route of 16.57 miles (26.67 km) runs from Highway 23 to US Highway 62. The highway passes over the Beaver Bridge, a 1943 suspension bridge, and Beaver Dam, constructed in the 1960s to provide water and electricity for the Northwest Arkansas region.

== Route description ==
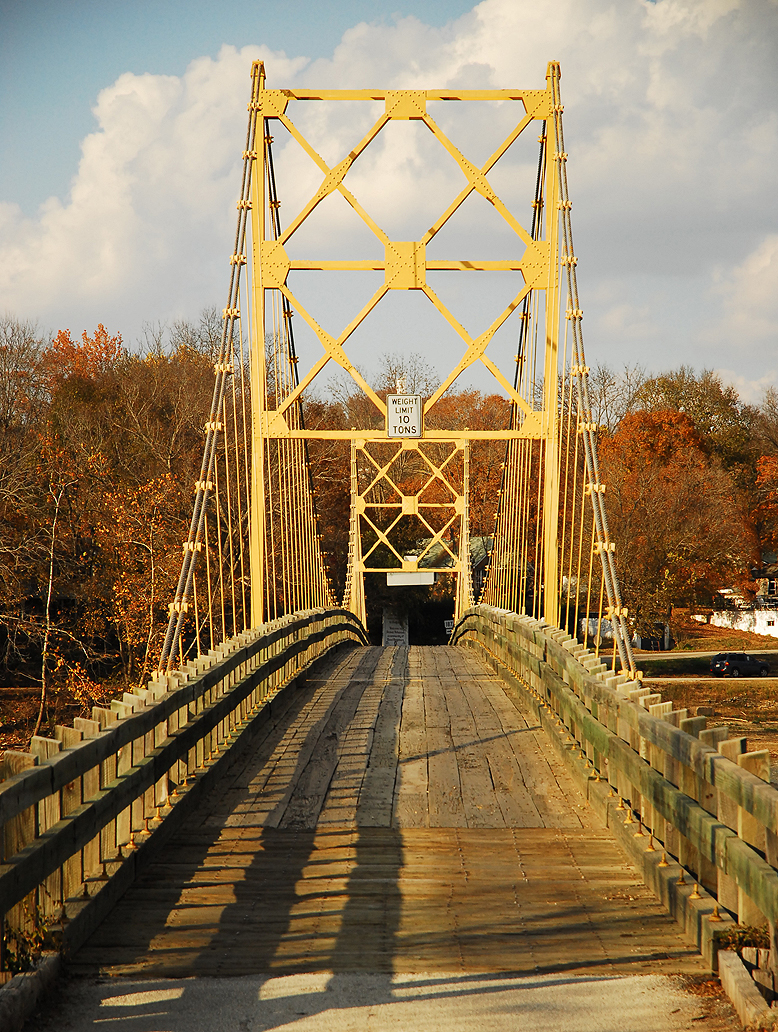
Beaver Bridge near Beaver is listed on the National Register of Historic Places.

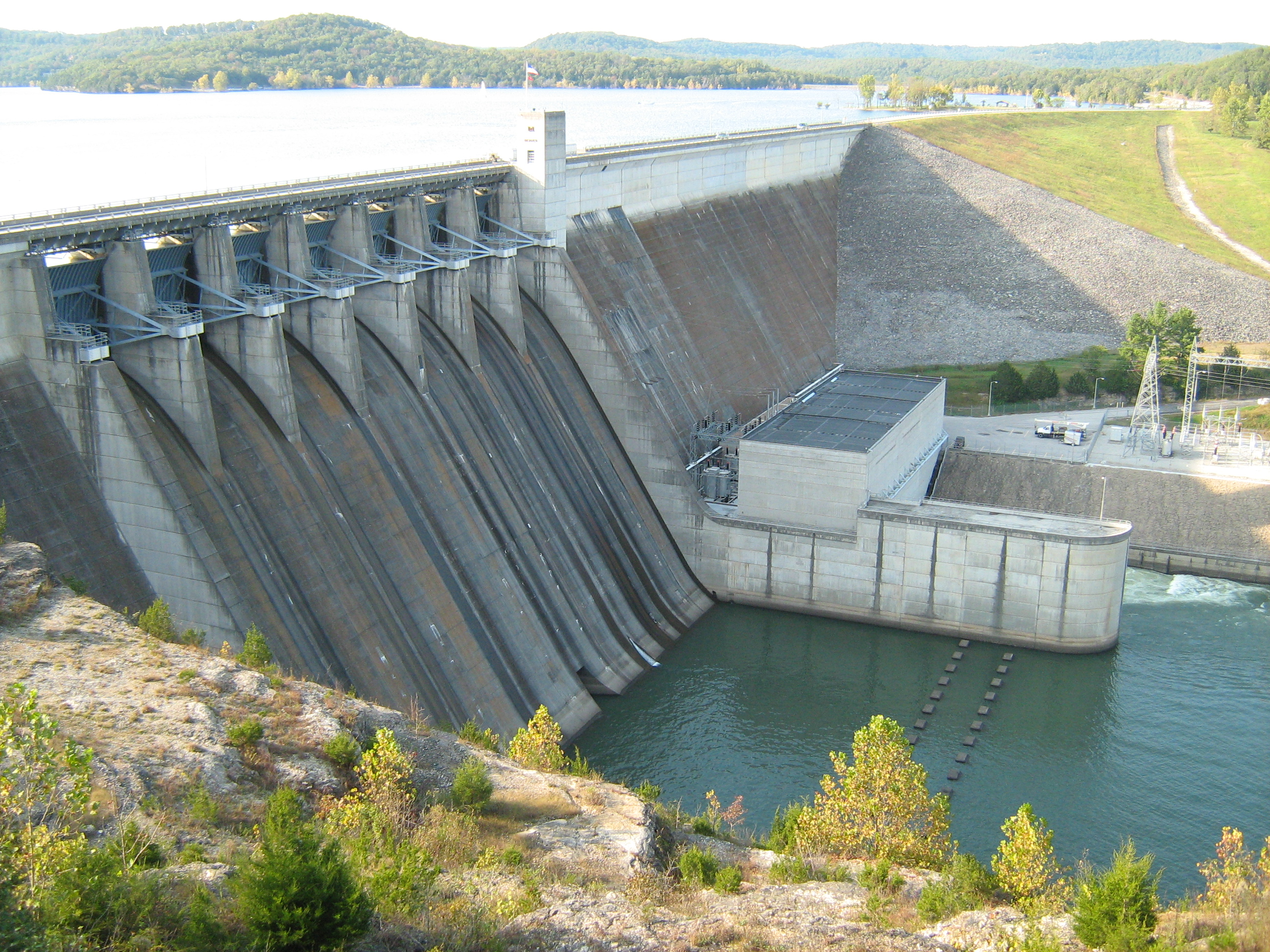
Highway 187 runs along the top of Beaver Dam.

The route begins at Highway 23 north of Eureka Springs and runs northwest over the Beaver Bridge to enter Beaver. The bridge is restricted to one–lane traffic with a 20,000 pounds (9,100 kg) weight limit and is listed on the National Register of Historic Places. After Beaver, Highway 187 curves east to meet US 62. The routes form a 0.9 miles (1.4 km) concurrency through Busch, after which Highway 187 turns south. Highway 187 enters Beaver Dam Park and rides atop Beaver Dam for 0.25 miles (0.40 km).

The route continues along Beaver Lake before turning east to terminate at US 62 near Eureka Springs.

== History ==
An earlier highway, also called Arkansas Highway 187, existed in Tuckerman from AR 37 north and east back to US 67 (now AR 367) from 1945 until 1953.

The current route was designated in June 1965.

== Major intersections ==
Mile markers reset at concurrencies. The entire route is in Carroll County.

Location	mi	km	Destinations	Notes
	0.00	0.00	AR 23 – Holiday Island, Eureka Springs	
Beaver	4.57– 4.68	7.35– 7.53	Beaver Bridge over Table Rock Lake	
Busch	7.32	11.78	US 62 west – Gateway, Rogers	
Busch	US 62 concurrency east, 0.9 miles (1.4 km)			
Busch	0.00	0.00	US 62 east – Eureka Springs, Harrison	
Beaver Lake	13.59– 13.84	21.87– 22.27	Beaver Dam	
	16.57	26.67	US 62 – Rogers, Eureka Springs	
1.000 mi = 1.609 km; 1.000 km = 0.621 mi
