= Debit (disambiguation) =

A debit is one side of an entry in double-entry bookkeeping, reflecting the amount taken out of an account.

Debit may also refer to:

== Finance and accounting ==
- Debit card, a type of payment card
  - Debit MasterCard, a brand of debit card
  - Visa Debit, a brand of debit card
- Bank account debits tax, an Australian tax
- Debit commission, a commission in the Holy Roman Empire
- Debit spread, a financial trading concept

== Grapes ==
- Debit (grape), a Croatian grape variety
- Debit, or Bombino bianco, an Italian grape variety

== Other uses ==
- Debits and Credits (book)
- "Debits Field", a derisive name for Citi Field

== See also ==
- Credit (disambiguation)
- Debito Arudou
- Debt
