= Barren Township =

Barren Township may refer to:

- Barren Township, Independence County, Arkansas
- Barren Township, Jackson County, Arkansas
- Barren Township, Franklin County, Illinois
