= Bois d'arc (disambiguation) =

Bois d'arc (Maclura pomifera) is a species of small tree also known as the Osage-orange.

Bois d'arc may also refer to:

== Places ==
- Bois d'Arc Township, Arkansas, a place in Arkansas
- Bois D'Arc Township, Montgomery County, Illinois
- Bois d'Arc, Kansas
- Bois D'Arc, Missouri
- Bois d'Arc, Texas
- The original name of Bonham, Texas

== Other uses ==
- Bois d'Arc Cooperative Dairy Farm Historic District, a historic district in Pettis County, Missouri
- Bois D'Arc Creek, a river in Texas
- Bois D'Arc Lake, a reservoir located in Fannin County, Texas.

== See also ==
- Bois d'Arc and Southern Railway
