= Beaver Bridge (Arkansas) =

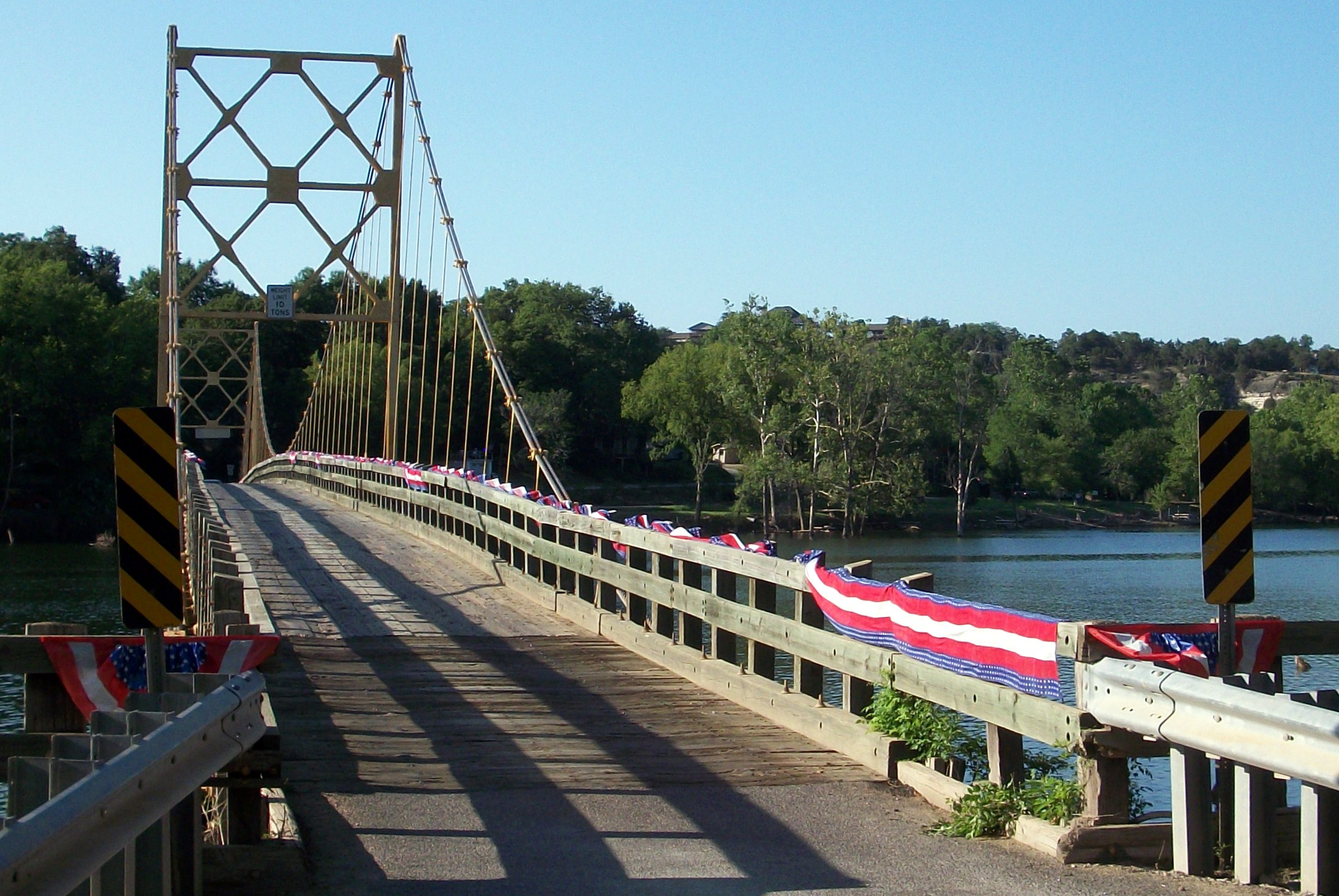
- Facing north, the bridge is decorated in red, white and blue bunting to celebrate Independence Day
- Coordinates: 36.4708°N 93.7683°W
- Carries: One lane of AR 187, pedestrians and bicycles
- Crosses: Table Rock Lake (an impoundment of the White River)
- Locale: Beaver, Carroll County, Arkansas
- Maintained by: Arkansas State Highway and Transportation Department (AHTD)

Characteristics
- Design: Suspension
- Material: Steel with timber decking
- Total length: 554.2 ft (168.9202 m)
- Width: 11.2 ft (3.414 m) (roadway); 12.1 ft (3.688 m) (deck)
- Height: 746 ft (227.4 m)
- Longest span: 312.0 ft (95.0976 m)
- Clearance above: 13.8 ft (4.206 m)

History
- Designer: AHTD
- Construction start: December 19, 1947
- Construction end: 1949
- Opened: 1949; 77 years ago

Statistics
- Daily traffic: 650

U.S. National Register of Historic Places
- Designated: April 9, 1990
- Reference no.: 90000730

Location
- Interactive map of Beaver Bridge

The Beaver Bridge in Beaver, Arkansas, is a historic one-lane suspension bridge carrying Arkansas Highway 187 over the White River at Table Rock Lake. Built in 1949 by the Pioneer Construction Company, the structure is the only suspension bridge open to traffic in Arkansas. The Beaver Bridge was added to the National Register of Historic Places in 1990.

== History ==
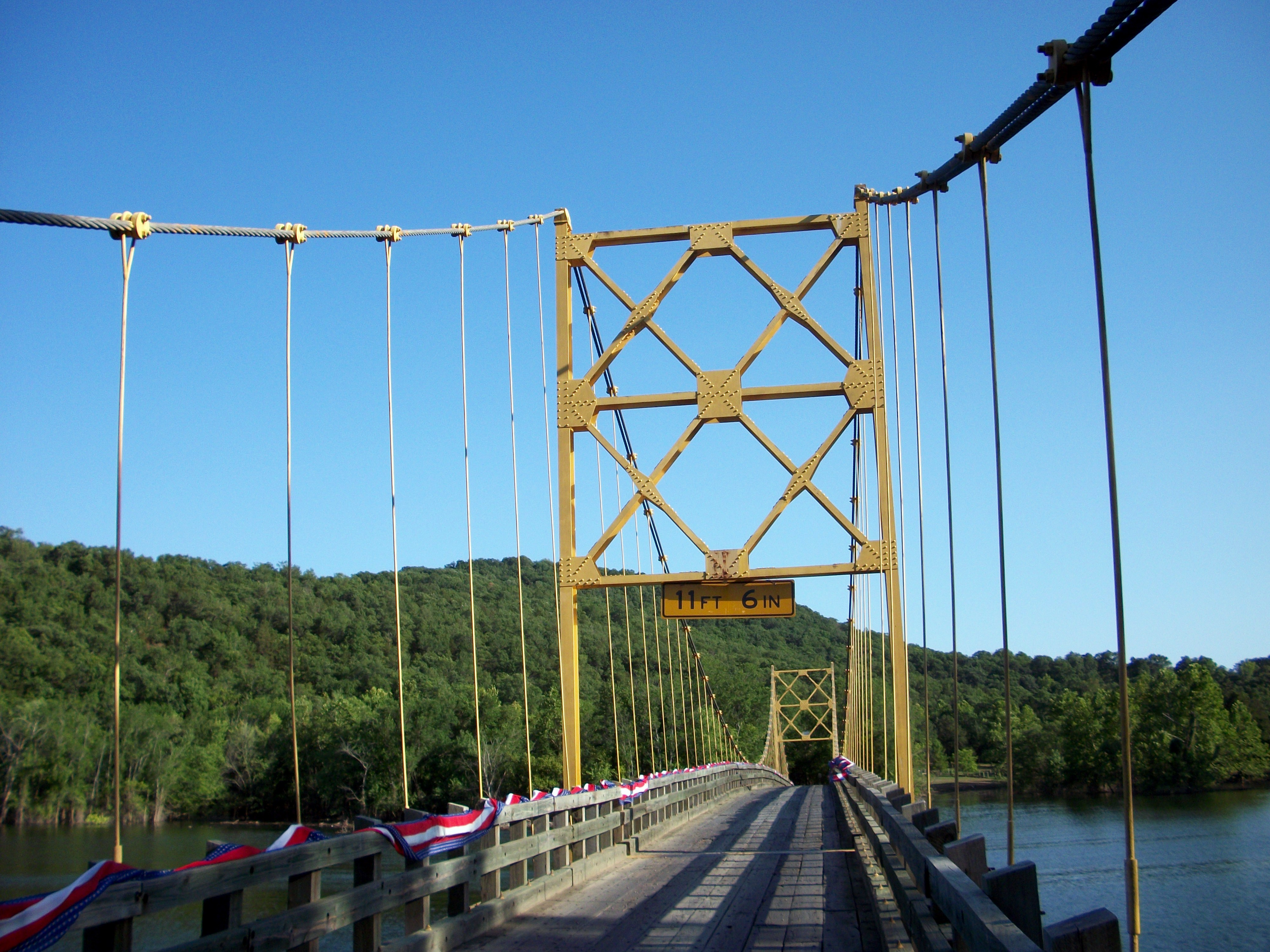
Close up on north tower

The bridge was bid on December 19, 1947, to Pioneer Construction Company of Malvern, Arkansas. The construction foreman who led the project was M. R. Blair (1914-2014), who later served as lead foreman on numerous bridge and highway projects across Arkansas, Missouri, and Tennessee, and who led the construction of numerous dams, highways and bridges throughout the southwestern United States, including the 1964 Big I interchange of Interstates 25 and 40 in Albuquerque, New Mexico. Remarkably, Blair and his team completed the project without the benefit of an industrial crane, using only a pickup-mounted, knuckle-boom type crane.

Since the construction was coincident with the building of Table Rock Dam, completion was delayed until 1949 as the United States Army Corps of Engineers required the bridge to be raised 40 feet (12 m). Upon completion, the bridge remained a vital link for the citizens of Beaver until its closure for major deck rehabilitation in 1981. Further rehabilitation occurred in 2003. At that time, the bridge had a 10-ton weight limit. The bridge was temporarily closed for inspection in October 2018 after two overweight buses crossed it. It was closed again on August 6, 2025, for emergency repairs after a structural issue was found during a routine inspection. The bridge opened on August 14, with weekly repairs scheduled. To help preserve the bridge, the weight limit was lowered from 10 tons to 5 tons.

== See also ==
- List of bridges documented by the Historic American Engineering Record in Arkansas
- List of bridges on the National Register of Historic Places in Arkansas
- National Register of Historic Places listings in Carroll County, Arkansas
