= Sneed, Arkansas =

Ghost town in Arkansas

Coordinates: 35.8728521°N 91.1140136°W

Sneed is a ghost town in Jackson County, Arkansas, United States.

== History ==
The namesake of the town, William Sneed, moved with his family from Illinois and settled in the area in which the town would eventually be founded following the Civil War.

Sneed Church and Sneed School were located next to each other in this rural farm community.

=== 1929 tornado ===
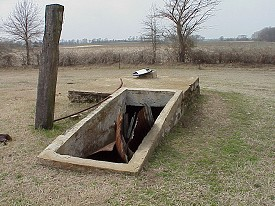
Some residents of Sneed hid in this storm cellar.

In the late afternoon of April 10, 1929, an F5 tornado, the highest rating on the Fujita scale, struck northern Jackson County—the only tornado of this intensity ever documented in Arkansas. Many residents saw the tornado approach and took shelter in storm cellars, under a road bridge, in a barn, or in a chicken house.

The tornado is believed to have begun about 3 mi (4.8 km) south of Batesville in Independence County. It then crossed into Jackson County in the Black River bottoms, likely north of Centerville. The tornado's maximum intensity was reached near Pleasant Valley (also known locally as Possum Trot), and then moved 2 mi (3.2 km) east to Sneed. Both Pleasant Valley and Sneed were almost completely destroyed by what witnesses described as a 0.5 mi (0.80 km) wide tornado. The tornado began to weaken after it passed and then moved southeast of Alicia.

Roads were blocked by large timbers and other debris, and the tornado's heavy rains made them very muddy, hindering rescue efforts. The death toll was listed at 23, and many others were seriously injured. A makeshift morgue was set up in Swifton.

All that remains today of Sneed is a clearing where the school and church formerly stood.

== See also ==
- List of F5 and EF5 tornadoes
- List of ghost towns in Arkansas
