= Banner Township =

Banner Township may refer to one of the following locations in the United States:

== Arkansas ==
- Banner Township, Ashley County, Arkansas
- Banner Township, Saline County, Arkansas

== Illinois ==
- Banner Township, Effingham County, Illinois
- Banner Township, Fulton County, Illinois

== Iowa ==
- Banner Township, Woodbury County, Iowa

== Kansas ==
- Banner Township, Dickinson County, Kansas
- Banner Township, Jackson County, Kansas
