= Illinois Township, Pope County, Arkansas =

Illinois Township
- Township
- Location in Arkansas
- Coordinates: 35°17′00″N 93°07′46″W
- Country: United States
- State: Arkansas
- County: Pope

Area
  - Total: 54.33 sq mi (140.7 km^{2})
  - Land: 48.29 sq mi (125.1 km^{2})
  - Water: 6.04 sq mi (15.6 km^{2}) 11.12%
- Elevation: 351 ft (107 m)

Population (2010)
  - Total: 29,813
  - Density: 617.4/sq mi (238.4/km^{2})
- Time zone: UTC-6 (CST)
  - Summer (DST): UTC-5 (CDT)
- Zip codes: 72801, 72802, 72811, 72812, 72858
- Area code: 479
- GNIS feature ID: 69707

Illinois Township is one of nineteen current townships in Pope County, Arkansas, USA. As of the 2010 census, its total population was 29,813, with 91.8 percent (approx. 27,370 people) contained in urban Russellville.

== Geography ==
According to the United States Census Bureau, Illinois Township covers an area of 54.33 square miles (140.7 km^{2}), with 48.29 square miles (125.1 km^{2}) of it land and 6.04 square miles (15.6 km^{2}) of water.

=== Cities, towns, and villages ===
- Bernice
- Bethel
- Pottsville (part)
- Russellville (part)
- New Hope
- North Dardanelle

=== Hydrology ===
The township contains Lake Dardanelle and Lake Dardanelle State Park.
