= Monterey, Illinois =

- Unincorporated community
- Location within Illinois Location within the United States
- Coordinates: 40°31′52″N 89°56′45″W
- Country: United States
- State: Illinois
- County: Fulton
- Elevation: 600 ft (180 m)
- Time zone: UTC-6 (Central (CST))
  - Summer (DST): UTC-5 (CDT)
- Area code: 309
- GNIS feature ID: 413742

Monterey is an unincorporated community in Fulton County, Illinois, United States. Monterey is located on Illinois Route 9, northwest of Banner and southeast of Canton.

Monterey is home to a Methodist church.,
