= Beaver, Arkansas =

- Town
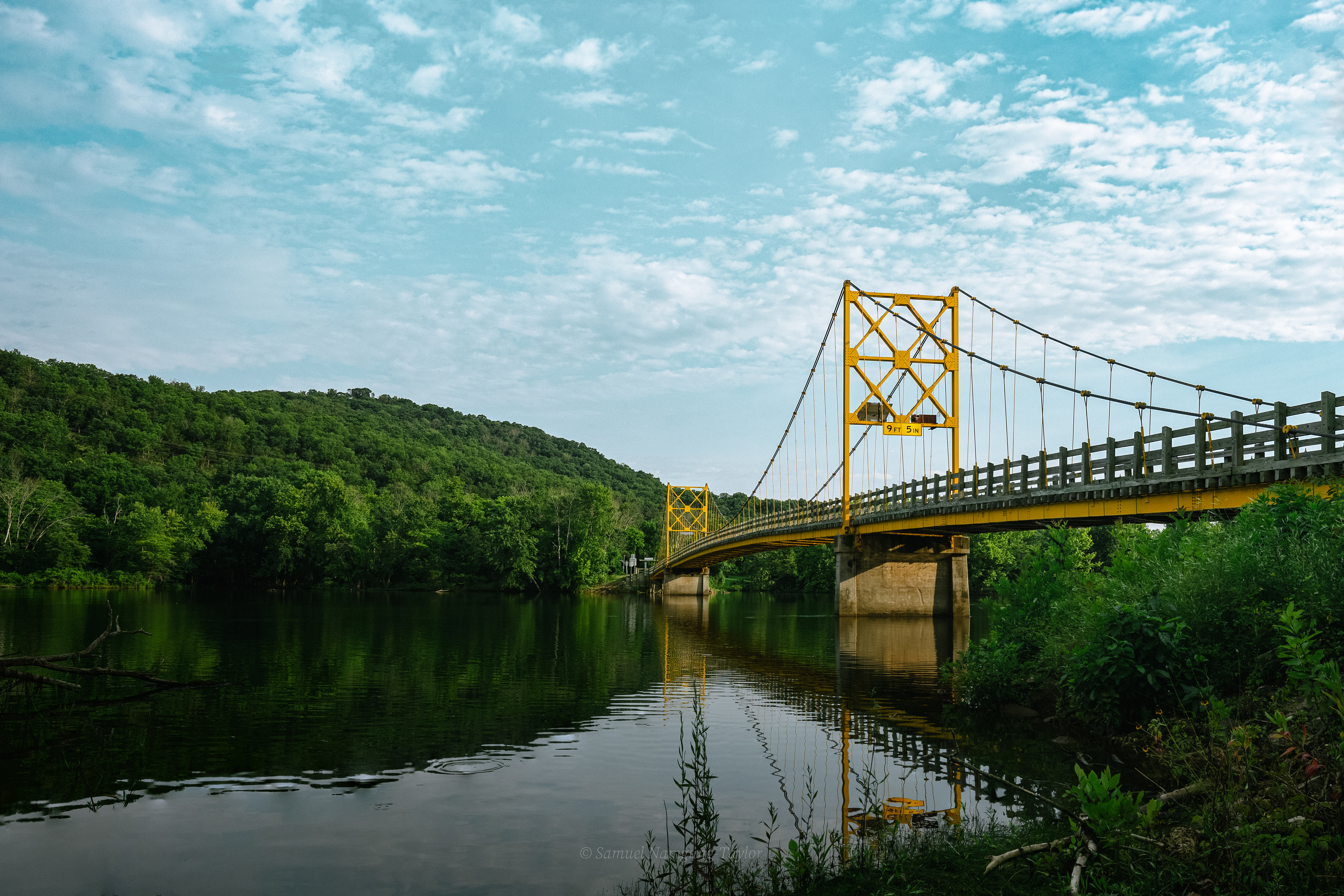
- The "Little Golden Gate Bridge"

- Location of Beaver in Carroll County, Arkansas.
- Coordinates: 36°28′31″N 93°46′22″W
- Country: United States
- State: Arkansas
- County: Carroll

Area
  - Total: 0.50 sq mi (1.29 km^{2})
  - Land: 0.32 sq mi (0.82 km^{2})
  - Water: 0.19 sq mi (0.48 km^{2})
- Elevation: 1,004 ft (306 m)

Population (2020)
  - Total: 67
  - Estimate (2025): 70 ▲
  - Density: 212.7/sq mi (82.14/km^{2})
- Time zone: UTC-6 (Central (CST))
  - Summer (DST): UTC-5 (CDT)
- ZIP code: 72613
- Area code: 479
- FIPS code: 05-04540
- GNIS feature ID: 2405224
- Website: www.beavertownarkansas.com

Beaver is a town in Carroll County, Arkansas, United States. As of the 2020 census it had a population of 67. The community is located on the White River at the western limits of Table Rock Lake deep in the Ozark Mountains. Located north of Eureka Springs, the small town has been featured in movies for its picturesque scenery. The town is known for the Beaver Bridge, a two-panel suspension bridge over the White River listed on the National Register of Historic Places.

== Geography ==
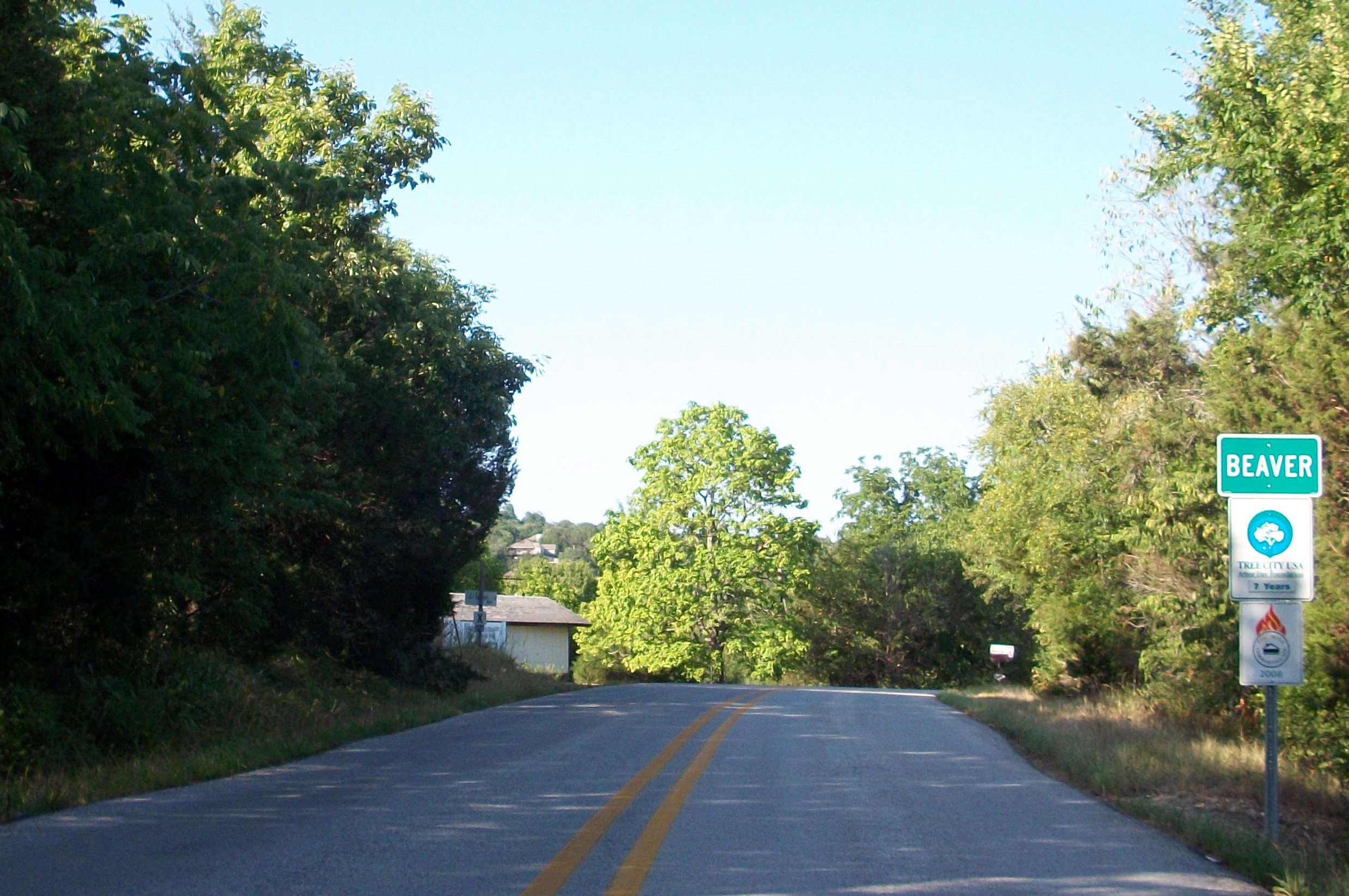
West entrance on Highway 187 to Beaver

Beaver is located in northwestern Carroll County.

According to the United States Census Bureau, the town has a total area of 0.54 square miles (1.4 km^{2}), of which 0.35 square miles (0.9 km^{2}) is land and 0.19 square miles (0.5 km^{2}), or 33.16%, is water.

Highway 187 is the only member of the Arkansas Highway System that serves Beaver. The route leads west 5 miles (8 km) to US Highway 62, which provides access to Eureka Springs to the southeast and Rogers to the west. The Arkansas Highway 23, the Pig Trail Scenic Byway, runs near the town as well, a popular route with tourists and motorcyclists.

== Demographics ==
Historical population
| Census | Pop. | Note | %± |
|---|---|---|---|
| 1960 | 24 | | — |
| 1990 | 57 | | — |
| 2000 | 95 | | 66.7% |
| 2010 | 100 | | 5.3% |
| 2020 | 67 | | −33.0% |
| 2025 (est.) | 70 | ▲ | 4.5% |
U.S. Decennial Census

As of the census of 2000, there were 95 people, 37 households, and 27 families residing in the town. The population density was 271.0 inhabitants per square mile (104.6/km^{2}). There were 43 housing units at an average density of 122.7 per square mile (47.4/km^{2}). The racial makeup of the town was 96.84% White, 2.11% from other races, and 1.05% from two or more races. 2.11% of the population were Hispanic or Latino of any race.

There were 37 households, of which 29.7% had children under the age of 18 living with them, 62.2% were married couples living together, 5.4% had a female householder with no husband present, and 27.0% were non-families. 21.6% of all households were made up of individuals, and 8.1% had someone living alone who was 65 years of age or older. The average household size was 2.57 and the average family size was 2.81.

In the town, the population was spread out, with 27.4% under the age of 18, 5.3% from 18 to 24, 23.2% from 25 to 44, 29.5% from 45 to 64, and 14.7% who were 65 years of age or older. The median age was 42 years. For every 100 females, there were 97.9 males. For every 100 females age 18 and over, there were 97.1 males.

The median income for a household in the town was $23,438, and the median income for a family was $25,417. Males had a median income of $25,417 versus $26,250 for females. The per capita income for the town was $11,665. There were 13.0% of families and 16.2% of the population living below the poverty line, including no one under the age of eighteen and none of those over 64.

== In popular culture ==
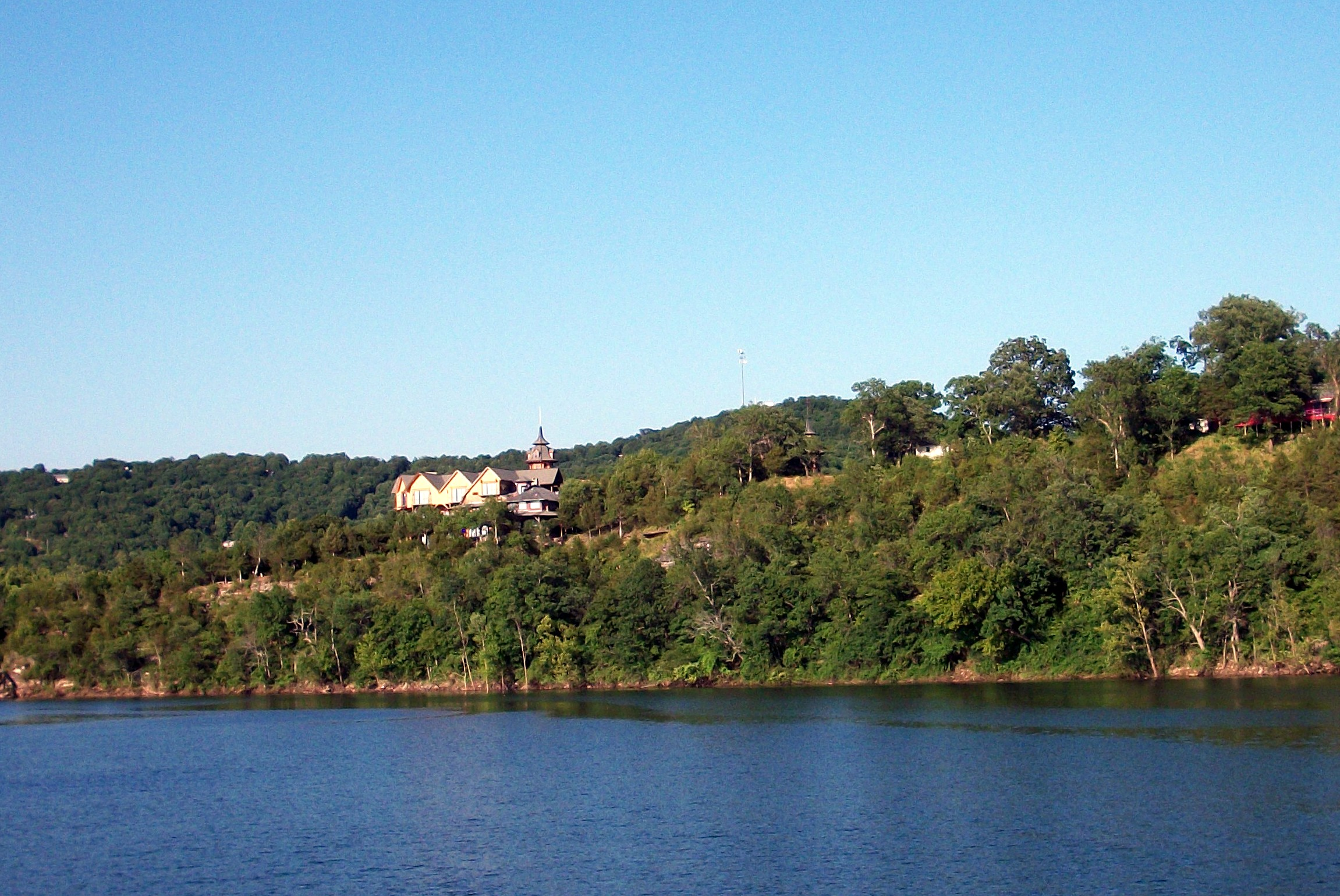
Castle Rogue's Manor on the shores of Table Rock Lake

The Beaver Bridge was depicted in the 2005 film Elizabethtown, and a nearby train trestle was featured in The Blue and the Gray.

== Climate ==
The climate is characterized by relatively high temperatures and evenly distributed precipitation throughout the year. The Köppen Climate Classification subtype for this climate is "Cfa" (Humid Subtropical Climate).

Climate data for Beaver, Arkansas
| Month | Jan | Feb | Mar | Apr | May | Jun | Jul | Aug | Sep | Oct | Nov | Dec | Year |
|---|---|---|---|---|---|---|---|---|---|---|---|---|---|
| Mean daily maximum °C (°F) | 8 (46) | 11 (51) | 16 (61) | 22 (72) | 26 (78) | 29 (85) | 33 (91) | 32 (90) | 27 (81) | 22 (72) | 15 (59) | 9 (49) | 21 (70) |
| Mean daily minimum °C (°F) | −4 (25) | −2 (29) | 3 (38) | 9 (48) | 13 (55) | 17 (63) | 19 (67) | 18 (65) | 15 (59) | 9 (49) | 4 (39) | −2 (29) | 8 (47) |
| Average precipitation cm (inches) | 5.1 (2) | 7.1 (2.8) | 10 (4.1) | 11 (4.2) | 12 (4.9) | 11 (4.4) | 8.4 (3.3) | 9.7 (3.8) | 10 (4.1) | 9.4 (3.7) | 9.7 (3.8) | 8.6 (3.4) | 113 (44.4) |
Source: Weatherbase
