= Winona Springs, Arkansas =

Defunct Arkansas town

Coordinates: 36°19′58″N 93°40′54″W

Winona Springs is an extinct town in southwest Carroll County, in the U.S. state of Arkansas.

The community was located in Winona Hollow adjacent to the Winona Spring. A meander in the Kings River is about one half mile to the southeast. Berryville lies about six miles to the northeast.

== History ==
The town's chief industry was timber, and in the 1880s, it contained a sawmill.
