= Bethel, Pope County, Arkansas =

Bethel, Arkansas
- Unincorporated community
- Bethel's position in Arkansas. Bethel, Arkansas (the United States)
- Coordinates: 35°14′56″N 93°06′33″W
- Country: United States
- State: Arkansas
- County: Pope County, Arkansas
- Elevation: 351 ft (107 m)
- Time zone: UTC-6 (Central (CST))
  - Summer (DST): UTC-5 (CDT)
- GNIS feature ID: 57365

Bethel is an unincorporated community in Illinois Township, Pope County, Arkansas, United States.
