= Midway (ghost town), Howard County, Arkansas =

Midway, Arkansas
- Ghost town
- Location within Arkansas Location within the United States
- Coordinates: 34°19′25″N 94°01′30″W
- Country: United States
- State: Arkansas
- County: Howard
- Elevation: 1,056 ft (322 m)
- GNIS feature ID: 62616

Midway is a ghost town in Howard County, Arkansas, United States. Midway was 2.8 miles (4.5 km) west of Athens.
