= Banner, Illinois =

- Village
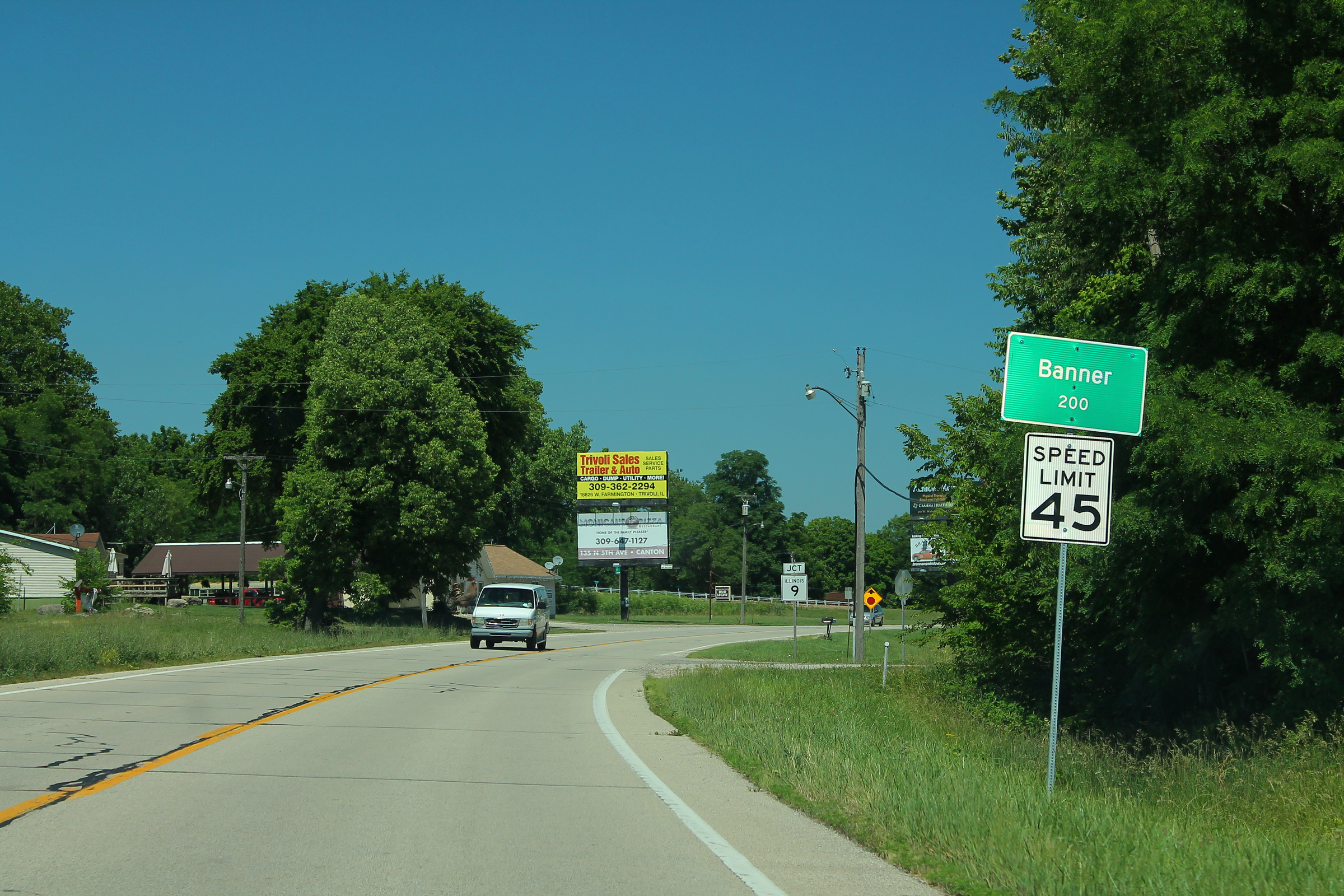
- Sign for the village of Banner, Illinois on U.S. Route 24.

- Location of Banner in Fulton County, Illinois.

- Location of Illinois in the United States
- Coordinates: 40°30′45″N 89°54′56″W
- Country: United States
- State: Illinois
- County: Fulton
- Township: Banner

Area
  - Total: 1.29 sq mi (3.34 km^{2})
  - Land: 1.29 sq mi (3.34 km^{2})
  - Water: 0 sq mi (0.00 km^{2})
- Elevation: 482 ft (147 m)

Population (2020)
  - Total: 169
- Time zone: UTC-6 (CST)
  - Summer (DST): UTC-5 (CDT)
- ZIP Code(s): 61520
- Area code: 309
- FIPS code: 17-03571
- GNIS ID: 2398028

Banner is a village in Fulton County, Illinois, United States. The population was 169 at the 2020 census.

The current president of Banner is Ronald Test. The former president of Banner for 28 years was Kenneth Fuller.

== Geography ==
Banner is located in eastern Fulton County on the southwest side of Copperas Creek north of the creek's mouth with the Illinois River.

U.S. Route 24 passes through Banner, leading northeast 22 miles (35 km) to Peoria and southwest 17 miles (27 km) to Lewistown, the Fulton County seat. Illinois Route 9 leads northwest from Banner 8 miles (13 km) to Canton, the largest city in Fulton County.

According to the 2021 census gazetteer files, Banner has a total area of 1.29 square miles (3.34 km^{2}), all land.

== Demographics ==
Historical population
| Census | Pop. | Note | %± |
|---|---|---|---|
| 1940 | 172 | | — |
| 1950 | 215 | | 25.0% |
| 1960 | 247 | | 14.9% |
| 1970 | 235 | | −4.9% |
| 1980 | 224 | | −4.7% |
| 1990 | 160 | | −28.6% |
| 2000 | 149 | | −6.9% |
| 2010 | 189 | | 26.8% |
| 2020 | 169 | | −10.6% |
U.S. Decennial Census

As of the 2020 census there were 169 people, 101 households, and 62 families residing in the village. The population density was 131.01 inhabitants per square mile (50.58/km^{2}). There were 95 housing units at an average density of 73.64 per square mile (28.43/km^{2}). The racial makeup of the village was 95.86% White, 0.00% African American, 0.59% Native American, 0.00% Asian, 0.00% Pacific Islander, 0.00% from other races, and 3.55% from two or more races. Hispanic or Latino of any race were 0.00% of the population.

There were 101 households, out of which 25.7% had children under the age of 18 living with them, 47.52% were married couples living together, 13.86% had a female householder with no husband present, and 38.61% were non-families. 36.63% of all households were made up of individuals, and 19.80% had someone living alone who was 65 years of age or older. The average household size was 2.61 and the average family size was 2.05.

The village's age distribution consisted of 18.8% under the age of 18, 2.9% from 18 to 24, 25.1% from 25 to 44, 21.7% from 45 to 64, and 31.4% who were 65 years of age or older. The median age was 45.4 years. For every 100 females, there were 107.0 males. For every 100 females age 18 and over, there were 107.4 males.

The median income for a household in the village was $47,188, and the median income for a family was $54,167. Males had a median income of $44,375 versus $18,636 for females. The per capita income for the village was $35,152. About 12.9% of families and 11.1% of the population were below the poverty line, including 23.1% of those under age 18 and 4.6% of those age 65 or over.
