= Bullfrog Valley, Arkansas =

- Unincorporated community
- Bullfrog Valley's position in Arkansas. Bullfrog Valley, Arkansas (the United States)
- Coordinates: 35°31′08″N 93°12′46″W
- Country: United States
- State: Arkansas
- County: Pope County, Arkansas
- Elevation: 669 ft (204 m)
- Time zone: UTC-6 (Central (CST))
  - Summer (DST): UTC-5 (CDT)
- GNIS feature ID: 59138

Bullfrog Valley is an unincorporated community in Illinois Township, Pope County, Arkansas, United States. It is located on Arkansas Highway 164 near the Johnson County line. The community is also located north of Silex.
