= Boyd, Arkansas =

- Unincorporated community
- Location within Arkansas Location within the United States
- Coordinates: 33°20′30″N 93°55′39″W
- Country: United States
- State: Arkansas
- County: Miller
- Elevation: 374 ft (114 m)
- Time zone: UTC-6 (Central (CST))
  - Summer (DST): UTC-5 (CDT)
- Area code: 870
- GNIS feature ID: 57420

Boyd is an unincorporated community in Miller County, Arkansas, United States. Boyd is located 8.8 miles (14.2 km) southeast of Texarkana.
