= Racket Ridge, Arkansas =

- Ghost town
- Location within Arkansas Location within the United States
- Coordinates: 35°32′48″N 92°38′46″W
- Country: United States
- State: Arkansas
- County: Van Buren
- Elevation: 1,332 ft (406 m)
- GNIS feature ID: 68691

Racket Ridge is a ghost town in Van Buren County, Arkansas, United States. Racket Ridge is located 2.2 miles (3.5 km) west-northwest of Scotland.
