= Credit line =

Credit line may refer to:

- Credit limit
- Line of credit
