= Banner Township, Fulton County, Illinois =

Banner Township
- Township
- Location in Fulton County

- Fulton County's location in Illinois
- Coordinates: 40°29′50″N 89°56′04″W
- Country: United States
- State: Illinois
- County: Fulton
- Established: November 6, 1849

Area
  - Total: 34.07 sq mi (88.2 km^{2})
  - Land: 28.50 sq mi (73.8 km^{2})
  - Water: 5.58 sq mi (14.5 km^{2}) 16.37%
- Elevation: 495 ft (151 m)

Population (2020)
  - Total: 325
  - Density: 11.4/sq mi (4.40/km^{2})
- Time zone: UTC-6 (CST)
  - Summer (DST): UTC-5 (CDT)
- ZIP codes: 61520
- FIPS code: 17-057-03584

Banner Township is one of twenty-six townships in Fulton County, Illinois, USA. As of the 2020 census, its population was 325 and it contained 184 housing units. The township was known as Utica Township, then Monterey Township, before becoming Banner Township.

== Geography ==
According to the 2021 census gazetteer files, Banner Township has a total area of 34.07 square miles (88.24 km^{2}), of which 28.50 square miles (73.81 km^{2}) (or 83.63%) is land and 5.58 square miles (14.45 km^{2}) (or 16.37%) is water.

=== Cities, towns, villages ===
- Banner

=== Unincorporated towns ===
- Monterey

(This list is based on USGS data and may include former settlements.)

- Kings Hill (Settlement with school & burying ground)
- Mills point
- Copperas Creek landing
- Commerce Was an early village on the mouth of the copperas creek where it empties into the Illinois River. Just like Mills Point it never materialized & ceased to exist. It was platted in 1843 by Lyman B. Suydam.

=== Cemeteries ===
The township contains these four cemeteries: Bybee, Kings Hill, Utica and Walnut.

=== Major highways ===
- US Route 24
- Illinois Route 9

=== Lakes ===
- Pond Lily Lake
- Slim Lake

== Demographics ==
As of the 2020 census there were 325 people, 176 households, and 79 families residing in the township. The population density was 9.54 inhabitants per square mile (3.68/km^{2}). There were 184 housing units at an average density of 5.40 units per square mile (2.08 units/km^{2}). The racial makeup of the township was 96.92% White, 0.00% African American, 0.31% Native American, 0.00% Asian, 0.00% Pacific Islander, 0.00% from other races, and 2.77% from two or more races. Hispanic or Latino of any race were 0.00% of the population.

There were 176 households, out of which 14.80% had children under the age of 18 living with them, 36.93% were married couples living together, 7.95% had a female householder with no spouse present, and 55.11% were non-families. 54.00% of all households were made up of individuals, and 17.60% had someone living alone who was 65 years of age or older. The average household size was 1.71 and the average family size was 2.51.

The township's age distribution consisted of 13.0% under the age of 18, 2.0% from 18 to 24, 27% from 25 to 44, 25% from 45 to 64, and 33.2% who were 65 years of age or older. The median age was 50.8 years. For every 100 females, there were 152.9 males. For every 100 females age 18 and over, there were 162.0 males.

The median income for a household in the township was $47,308, and the median income for a family was $53,125. Males had a median income of $46,250 versus $17,955 for females. The per capita income for the township was $39,583. About 10.1% of families and 17.3% of the population were below the poverty line, including 23.1% of those under age 18 and 3.0% of those age 65 or over.

Historical population
| Census | Pop. | Note | %± |
|---|---|---|---|
| 2000 | 340 | | — |
| 2010 | 373 | | 9.7% |
| 2020 | 325 | | −12.9% |
U.S. Decennial Census

== School districts ==
- Canton Union School District 66
- Illini Bluffs Community Unit School District 327

== Political districts ==
- Illinois' 17th congressional district
- State House District 91
- State Senate District 46
