= Booger Hollow, Arkansas =

Ghost town in Arkansas, United States

Coordinates: 35°36′48″N 93°03′41″W

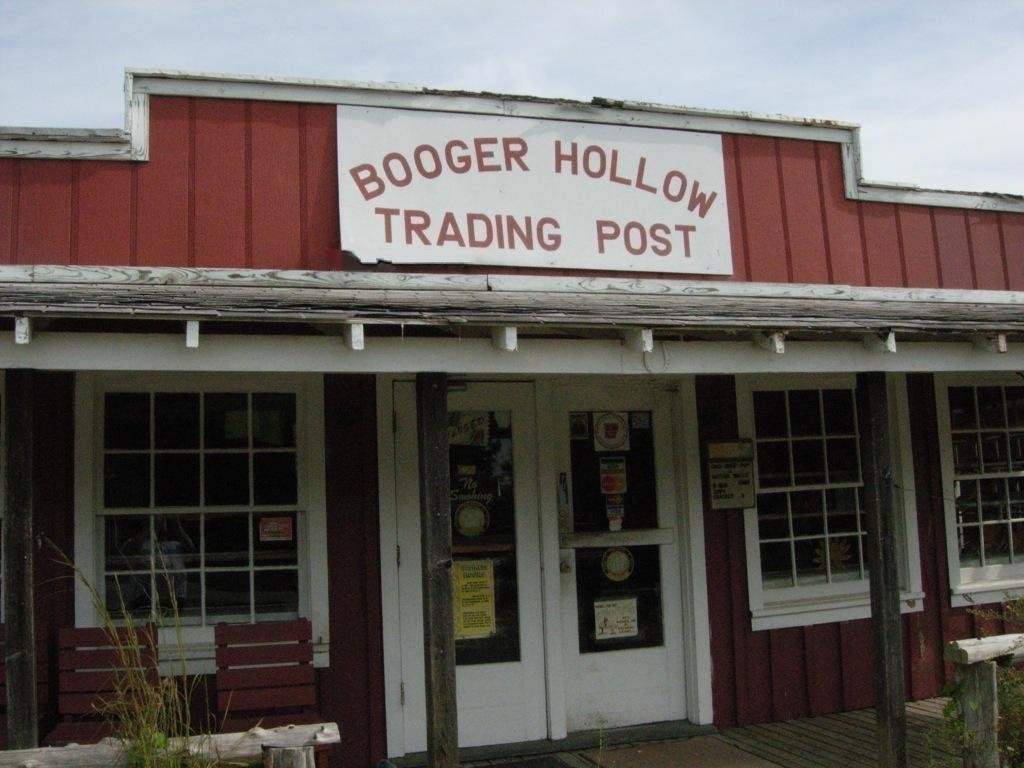
The abandoned Booger Hollow Trading Post, August 2007.

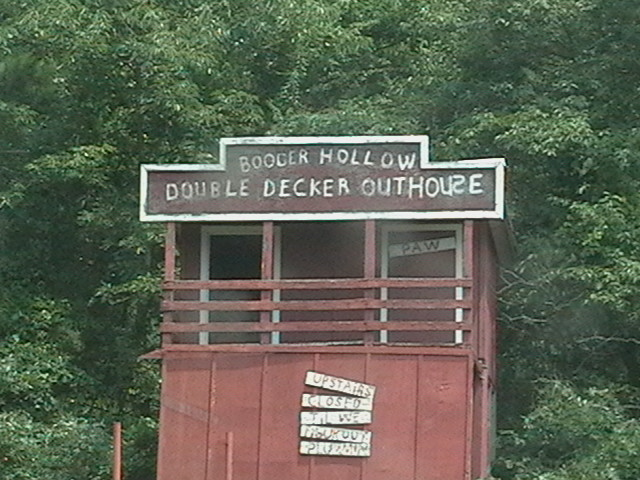
"Booger Hollow Double Decker Outhouse" in August 2007, abandoned and with missing door and signs.

Established in 1961, Booger Hollow Trading Post was a tourist attraction in Pope County, Arkansas. A sign near the attraction's entrance read "Population 7...countin' one coon dog". The trading post offered hillbilly and locally themed novelties for tourists as well as local goods such as lye-soap, honey, and sorghum. The Boogerhollow Chuckwagon Cafe had standard fare with colorful menu names such as the "boogerburger" and the "boogerdog."

The attraction actually was actually twelve miles from the community of Booger Hollow, Arkansas. It is also located on a ridgetop of the Ozarks' Boston Mountains, instead of within a hollow.

The name of the hollow is derived from a belief in the 1800s that the area where the road through the hollow ran between two cemeteries was haunted. Booger in this instance is a variant of bogeyman, a mythical creature, ghost, or hobgoblin; also boogerman, or boogieman.

The Booger Hollow Trading Post owner decided to sell in 2004, but the new owners never reopened the attraction.

The former trading post buildings are abandoned and being reclaimed by nature.

A popular photo prop was a two-story outhouse. The lower level was functional but the upper level was perpetually closed "until we git the plummin' figgered out."

See book, The Man From Booger Hollow by American author Gary Bryan Jones, published June 2025.
