= Buttermilk Sky =

Nigerian dwarf goat (born 2012)

- Species: Goat
- Breed: Nigerian Dwarf
- Sex: Female
- Born: June 17, 2012
- Known for: YouTube viral video
- Owner: Took a Leap Farm
- Residence: Houlton, Maine
- Appearance: Chamoisee with white belt

Buttermilk Sky is a Nigerian Dwarf goat and the subject of a video that went viral after it was posted to YouTube on 27 July 2012. The video was taken at Took A Leap Farm, a hobby farm in Houlton, Maine.

== About ==
The video was posted on 27 July with the caption "Buttermilk 'plays' with her 'friends'". Buttermilk Sky is seen running animatedly about in a grassy clearing while three other goats of similar size and age look on. On several occasions she jumps up, even hopping over other goats and accosting a human observer. At one point she leaps up and knocks another goat down, an act which has sparked criticism from some Internet commentators for its apparently wilful nature. The video has received over 16 million views on YouTube, has been commented on by Maine Congresswoman Chellie Pingree, and has been featured on The Today Show.

== Media appearances ==
Buttermilk Sky is part of Took a Leap's dairy goat herd. She was born at Took a Leap Farm on 17 June 2012 (one of the last kids born that year at the farm) and was five weeks old when the video was taken in July 2012. Her colour is described as "chamoisee with white belt". According to her owners, Buttermilk Sky is known for her energy; however, the kicking was a first-time occurrence, which was caught on video by chance.

One of Buttermilk's owners commented that, before the video went viral, she had pledged to donate $25 to Farm Sanctuary, a not-for-profit animal welfare group, should it receive more than one thousand views. Afterwards, she suggested that a collaborative publicity campaign with Farm Sanctuary was being considered, to take advantage of the attention Buttermilk has received.
