= Oregon, Arkansas =

Ghost town in Arkansas, United States

Coordinates: 36.302°N 93.021°W

Oregon is a ghost town in Boone County, in the U.S. state of Arkansas.

== History ==
The Oregon post office closed in 1896. The community was named for the territory of Oregon.
