= Silex, Arkansas =

- Unincorporated community
- Position in Arkansas
- Coordinates: 35°30′02″N 93°12′55″W
- Country: United States
- State: Arkansas
- County: Pope
- Elevation: 912 ft (278 m)
- Time zone: UTC-6 (Central (CST))
  - Summer (DST): UTC-5 (CDT)
- GNIS feature ID: 73580

Silex is an unincorporated community in Martin Township, Pope County, Arkansas, United States.
