= Beaver Shores, Arkansas =

Unincorporated community in Arkansas, US

Coordinates: 36°19′22″N 94°01′10″W

Beaver Shores is an unincorporated community in Benton County, Arkansas, United States.
