= Mount Olive, Howard County, Arkansas =

- Ghost town
- Location within Arkansas Location within the United States
- Coordinates: 33°56′58″N 93°54′25″W
- Country: United States
- State: Arkansas
- County: Howard
- Elevation: 453 ft (138 m)
- GNIS feature ID: 62624

Mount Olive is a ghost town in Howard County, Arkansas, United States. Mount Olive was located along U.S. Route 371, 3.4 miles (5.5 km) west of Nashville.
