= Bernice, Arkansas =

- Unincorporated community
- Bernice's position in Arkansas. Bernice, Arkansas (the United States)
- Coordinates: 35°15′00″N 93°07′47″W
- Country: United States
- State: Arkansas
- County: Pope County, Arkansas
- Elevation: 351 ft (107 m)
- Time zone: UTC-6 (Central (CST))
  - Summer (DST): UTC-5 (CDT)
- GNIS feature ID: 57362

Once an unincorporated community in Illinois Township, Pope County, Arkansas, United States, Bernice, located on Arkansas Highway 7 Truck, is now part of Russellville.
