= Blansett, Arkansas =

Extinct town

Coordinates: 34°47′24″N 94°13′13″W

Blansett is an extinct town in Scott County, in the U.S. state of Arkansas. The GNIS classifies it as a populated place.

== History ==
Blansett was founded in 1877, and named after Jim Blansett, a pioneer citizen. A post office called Blansett was established in 1877, and remained in operation until 1942.
