= Bidville, Arkansas =

Human settlement in Arkansas, USA

Coordinates: 35°44′23″N 93°58′55″W

Bidville is an unincorporated community in northeast Crawford County, in the U.S. state of Arkansas. The United States Census Bureau lists Bidville as a township, with a land area of 29 square miles. In 2020 Bidville had a population of 41.

== History ==
The community was first called Shepherd Mountain. It was later named for "Bid" Renfro, who worked to get a post office for the community. The post office was in operation at Bidville from 1880 until 1943. John Rucks was the first postmaster.

== Bidville Cemetery ==
In the 1840s the Bidville Cemetery began with the burial of William Shepherd, an early pioneer who had moved to the area in the late 1830s. His wife Sallie and daughter Matilda buried him during an ice-storm. A few days later his daughter died of pneumonia, and she was buried beside her father.

In about 1900 the tradition started of local families bringing their dinners to the cemetery, spending the day cleaning and decorating the graves, and then they would finish the day by singing hymns and listening to a local preacher give a talk. Over time this Decoration Day event became known as the Folk Festival of the Family.
