= Credit, Arkansas =

Coordinates: 35.721744°N 91.005677°W

Credit is an extinct town in Craighead County, Arkansas, United States.

Credit got its start in the 1890s when the railroad was extended to that point. The community's name may have been a play on words with nearby Cash, Arkansas. A post office called Credit was established in 1896, and remained in operation until 1902.
