= Black Fork, Arkansas =

Unincorporated community in Arkansas, U.S.

Coordinates: 34°46′01″N 94°25′52″W

Black Fork is an unincorporated community in Scott County, in the U.S. state of Arkansas.

== History ==
The community takes its name from nearby Black Fork creek. A variant name is "Blackfork". A post office called Black Fork was established in 1877, and became a rural station in 1981.
