= Buttermilk, Arkansas =

- Unincorporated community
- Buttermilk's position in Arkansas. Buttermilk, Arkansas (the United States)
- Coordinates: 35°23′14″N 92°53′50″W
- Country: United States
- State: Arkansas
- County: Pope County, Arkansas
- Elevation: 417 ft (127 m)
- Time zone: UTC-6 (Central (CST))
  - Summer (DST): UTC-5 (CDT)
- GNIS feature ID: 70941

Buttermilk is an unincorporated community in Pope County, Arkansas, United States. The community's name was derived from an observer who saw the whitewash run off the Cumberland Presbyterian Church during a rain storm in 1840 and commented that it looked like buttermilk.
