= Bartholomew Township, Drew County, Arkansas =

Bartholomew Township
- Township
- Location in Arkansas Bartholomew Township (the United States)
- Coordinates: 33°30′21″N 91°28′04″W
- Country: United States
- State: Arkansas
- County: Drew

Area
  - Total: 75.126 sq mi (194.58 km^{2})
  - Land: 74.469 sq mi (192.87 km^{2})
  - Water: 0.657 sq mi (1.70 km^{2})
- Elevation: 138 ft (42 m)

Population (2010)
  - Total: 168
  - Density: 2.26/sq mi (0.871/km^{2})
- Time zone: UTC-6 (CST)
  - Summer (DST): UTC-5 (CDT)
- FIPS code: 05-90132
- GNIS ID: 66508

Bartholomew Township is a township in Drew County, Arkansas, United States. Its total population was 168 as of the 2010 United States census, a decrease of 24.66 percent from 223 at the 2000 census.

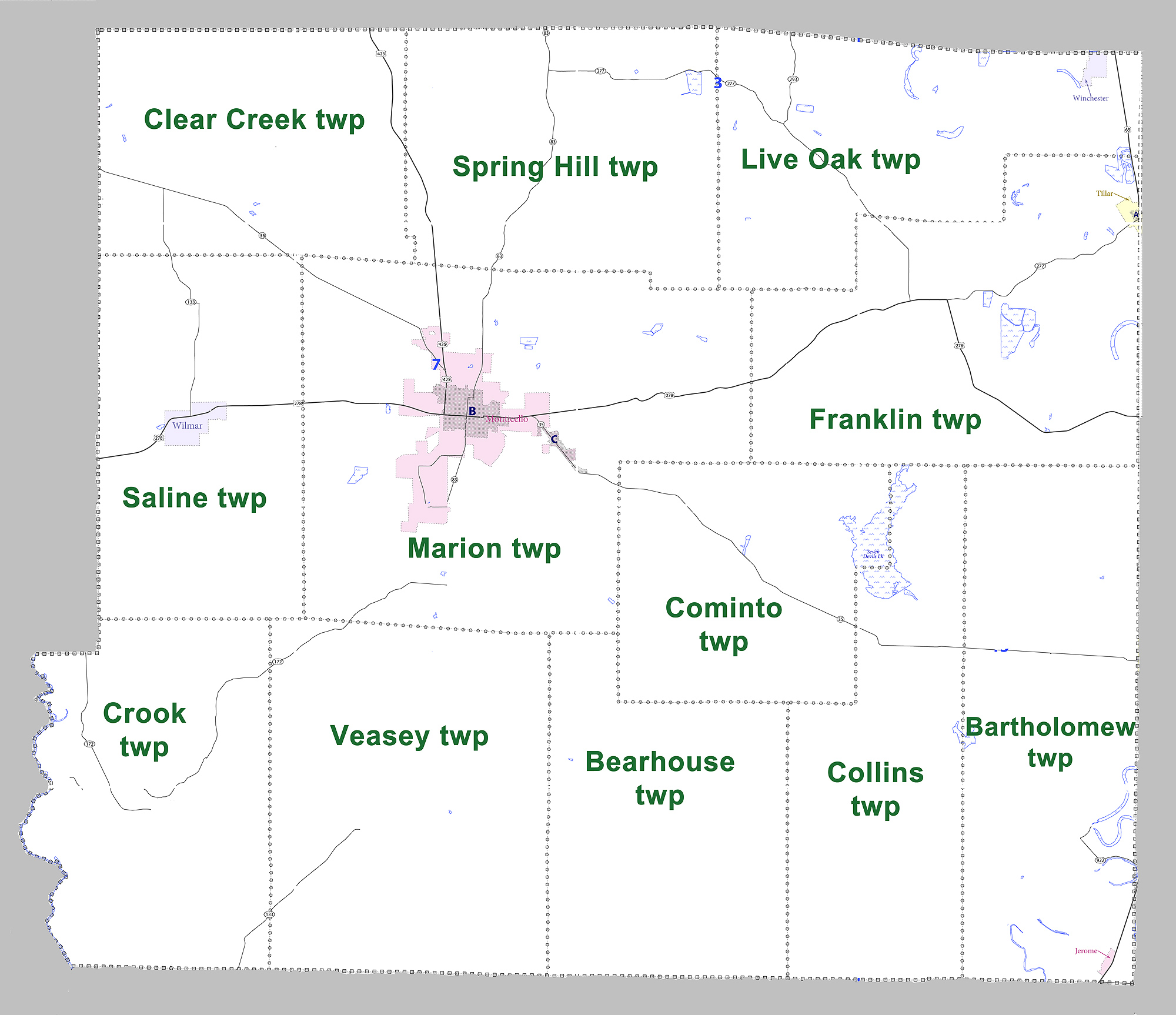
Townships in Drew County as of 2010

According to the 2010 Census, Bartholomew Township is located at 33°30′21″N 91°28′04″W (33.505775, -91.467687). It has a total area of 75.126 square miles (194.58 square kilometers), of which 74.469 sq mi (192.87 km^{2}) is land and 0.657 sq mi (1.70 km^{2}) is water (0.87%). As per the USGS National Elevation Dataset, the elevation is 138 feet (42 m).

The town of Jerome is located within the township.
