= Busch, Arkansas =

- Unincorporated community
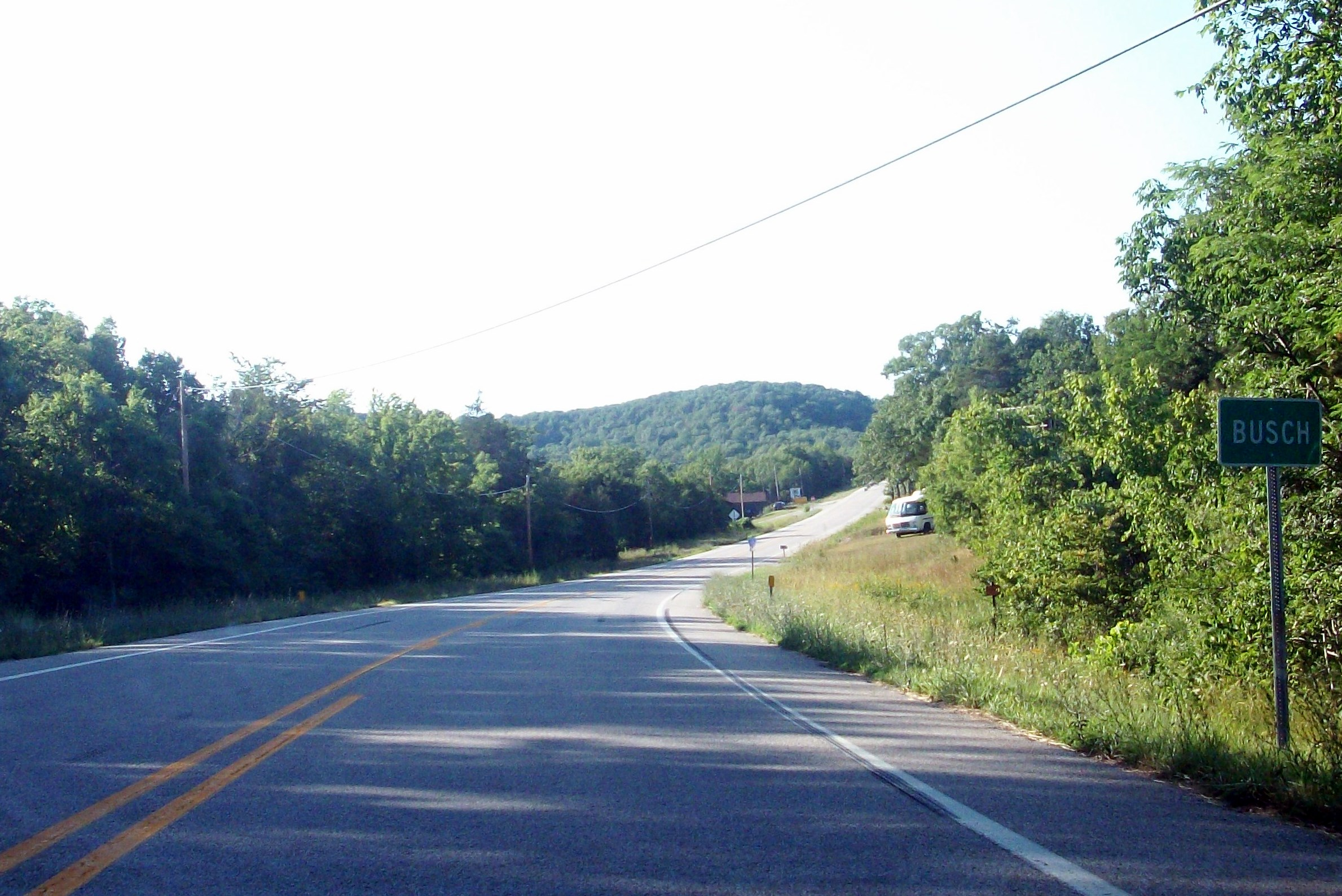
- Sign for Busch on US 62

- Location within Arkansas Location within the United States
- Coordinates: 36°27′51″N 93°49′51″W
- Country: United States
- State: Arkansas
- County: Carroll
- Elevation: 1,109 ft (338 m)
- Time zone: UTC-6 (Central (CST))
  - Summer (DST): UTC-5 (CDT)
- Area code: 479
- GNIS feature ID: 57478

Busch is an unincorporated community in Carroll County, Arkansas, United States. Busch is located on U.S. Route 62, 6.75 miles (10.86 km) northwest of Eureka Springs.
