= Sensation, Arkansas =

Coordinates: 34.8585°N 94.2879°W

Sensation is an extinct town in Scott County, in the U.S. state of Arkansas.

== History ==
A post office was established at Sensation in 1916, and remained in operation until 1919. It is unknown why the name "Sensation" was applied to this community.
