= Baker Township, Izard County, Arkansas =

Township in Arkansas, United States

Baker Township
- Township
- Location in Arkansas Baker Township (the United States)
- Coordinates: 36°13′33″N 91°49′41″W
- Country: United States
- State: Arkansas
- County: Izard

Area
  - Total: 20.122 sq mi (52.12 km^{2})
  - Land: 20.122 sq mi (52.12 km^{2})
  - Water: 0.000 sq mi (0 km^{2})
- Elevation: 617 ft (188 m)

Population (2010)
  - Total: 203
  - Density: 10.1/sq mi (3.90/km^{2})
- Time zone: UTC-6 (CST)
  - Summer (DST): UTC-5 (CDT)
- FIPS code: 05-90087
- GNIS ID: 66693

Baker Township is a township in Izard County, Arkansas, United States. Its total population was 203 as of the 2010 United States census, an increase of 0.5 percent from 202 at the 2000 census.

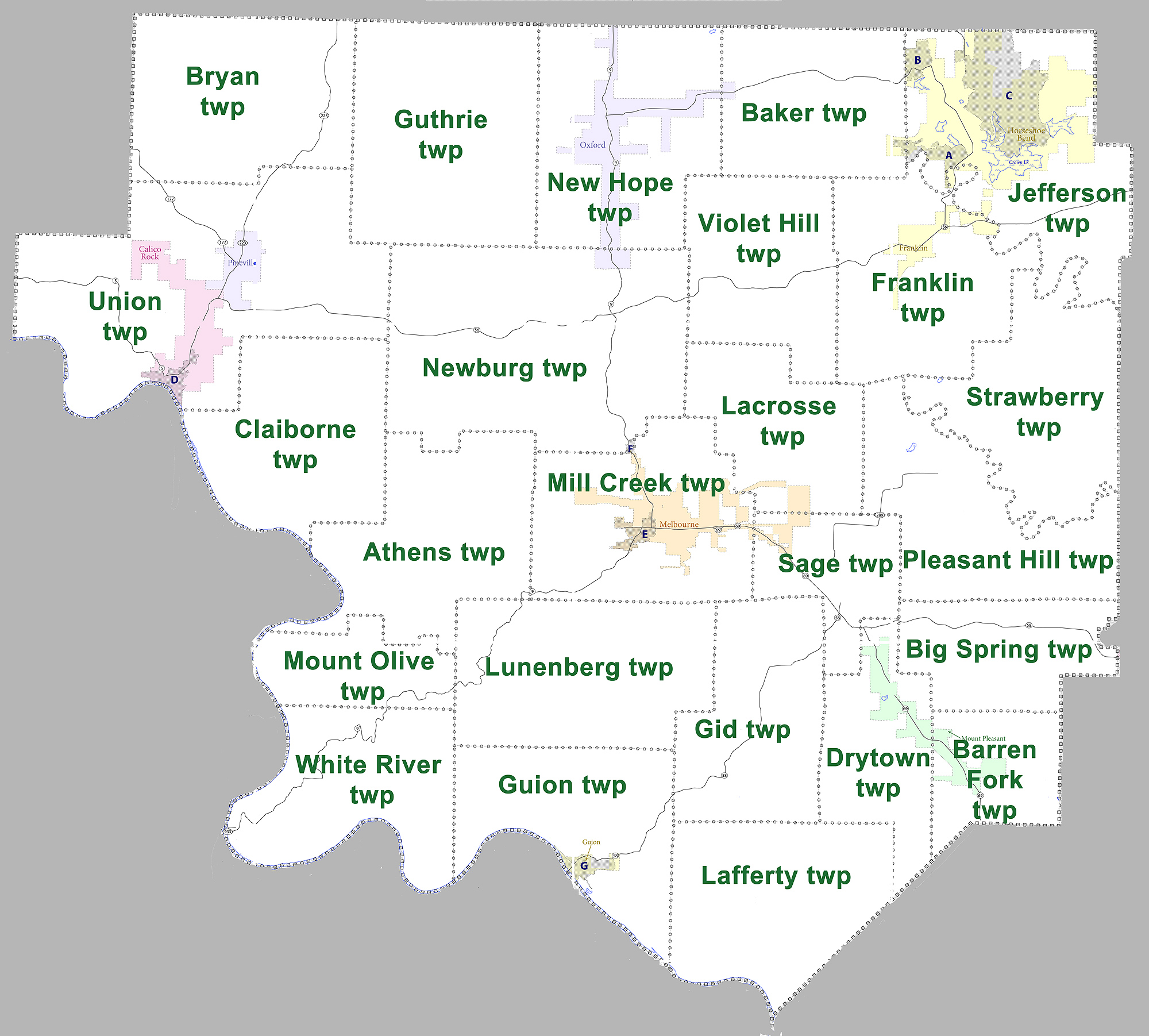
Townships in Izard County as of 2010

According to the 2010 Census, Baker Township is located at 36°13′33″N 91°49′41″W (36.225927, -91.828099). It has a total area of 20.122 square miles (52.12 square kilometers); all of which is land. As per the USGS National Elevation Dataset, the elevation is 617 feet (188 m).

Parts of the cities of Horseshoe Bend and Oxford are located within the township.
