= Baker Township, Randolph County, Arkansas =

Baker Township
- Township
- Location in Arkansas Baker Township (the United States)
- Coordinates: 36°27′44″N 91°08′04″W
- Country: United States
- State: Arkansas
- County: Randolph

Area
  - Total: 16.172 sq mi (41.89 km^{2})
  - Land: 16.131 sq mi (41.78 km^{2})
  - Water: 0.041 sq mi (0.11 km^{2})
- Elevation: 476 ft (145 m)

Population (2010)
  - Total: 55
  - Density: 3.4/sq mi (1.3/km^{2})
- Time zone: UTC-6 (CST)
  - Summer (DST): UTC-5 (CDT)
- FIPS code: 05-90093
- GNIS ID: 69015

Baker Township is a township in Randolph County, Arkansas, United States. Its total population was 55 as of the 2010 United States census, an increase of 1.85 percent from 54 at the 2000 census.

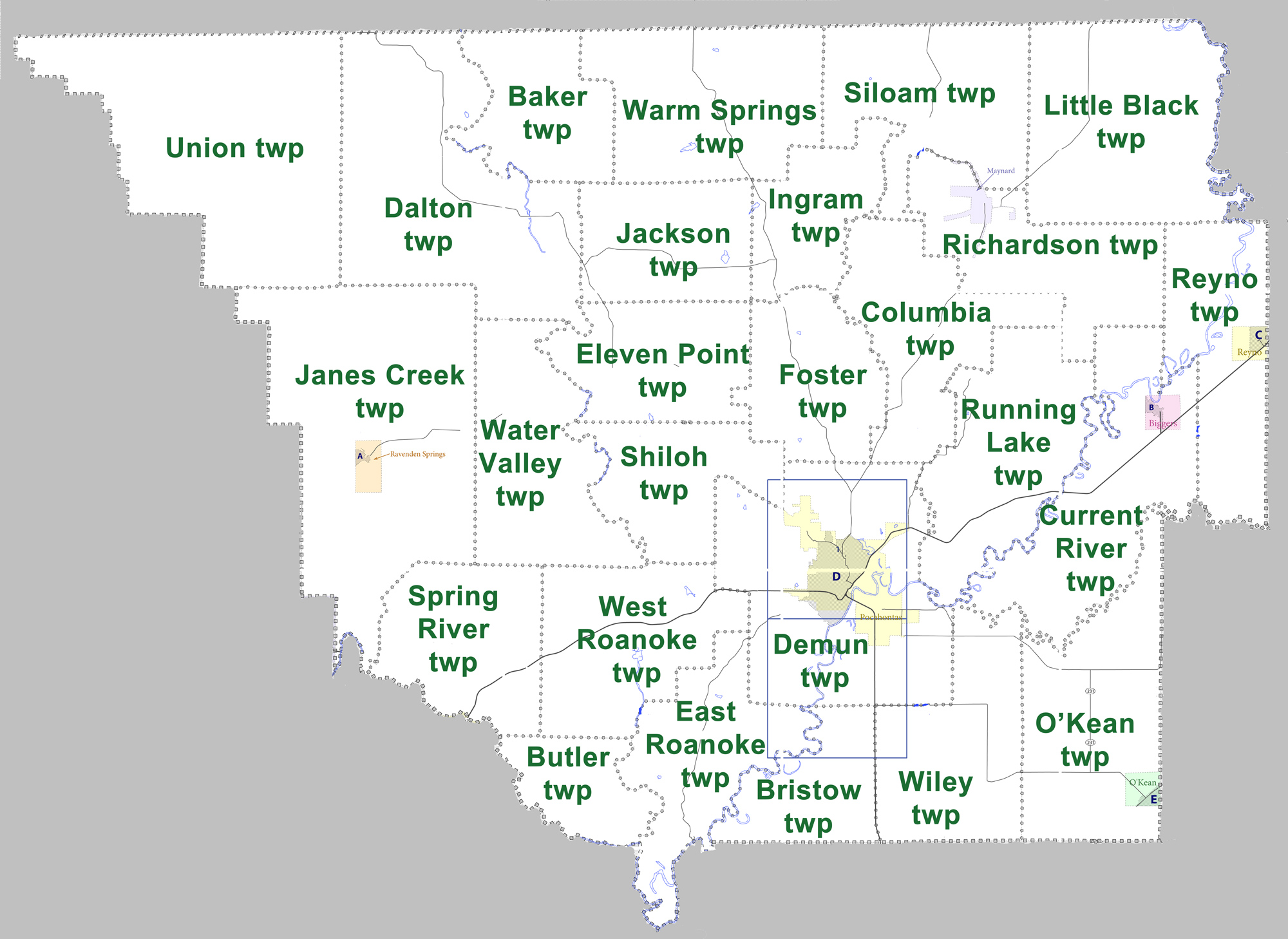
Townships in Randolph County as of 2010

According to the 2010 Census, Baker Township is located at 36°27′44″N 91°08′04″W (36.462305, -91.134313). It has a total area of 16.172 square miles (41.89 square kilometers); of which 16.131 sq mi (41.78 km^{2}) is land and 0.041 sq mi (0.11 km^{2}) is water (0.25%). As per the USGS National Elevation Dataset, the elevation is 476 feet (145 m).
