= Barren Township, Jackson County, Arkansas =

Barren Township
- Township
- Location in Arkansas Barren Township (the United States)
- Coordinates: 35°29′17″N 91°32′23″W
- Country: United States
- State: Arkansas
- County: Jackson

Area
  - Total: 35.435 sq mi (91.78 km^{2})
  - Land: 35.422 sq mi (91.74 km^{2})
  - Water: 0.013 sq mi (0.034 km^{2})
- Elevation: 614 ft (187 m)

Population (2010)
  - Total: 910
  - Density: 26/sq mi (9.9/km^{2})
- Time zone: UTC-6 (CST)
  - Summer (DST): UTC-5 (CDT)
- FIPS code: 05-90126
- GNIS ID: 66717

Barren Township is a township in Jackson County, Arkansas, United States. Its total population was 910 as of the 2010 United States census, an increase of 6.93 percent from 851 at the 2000 census.

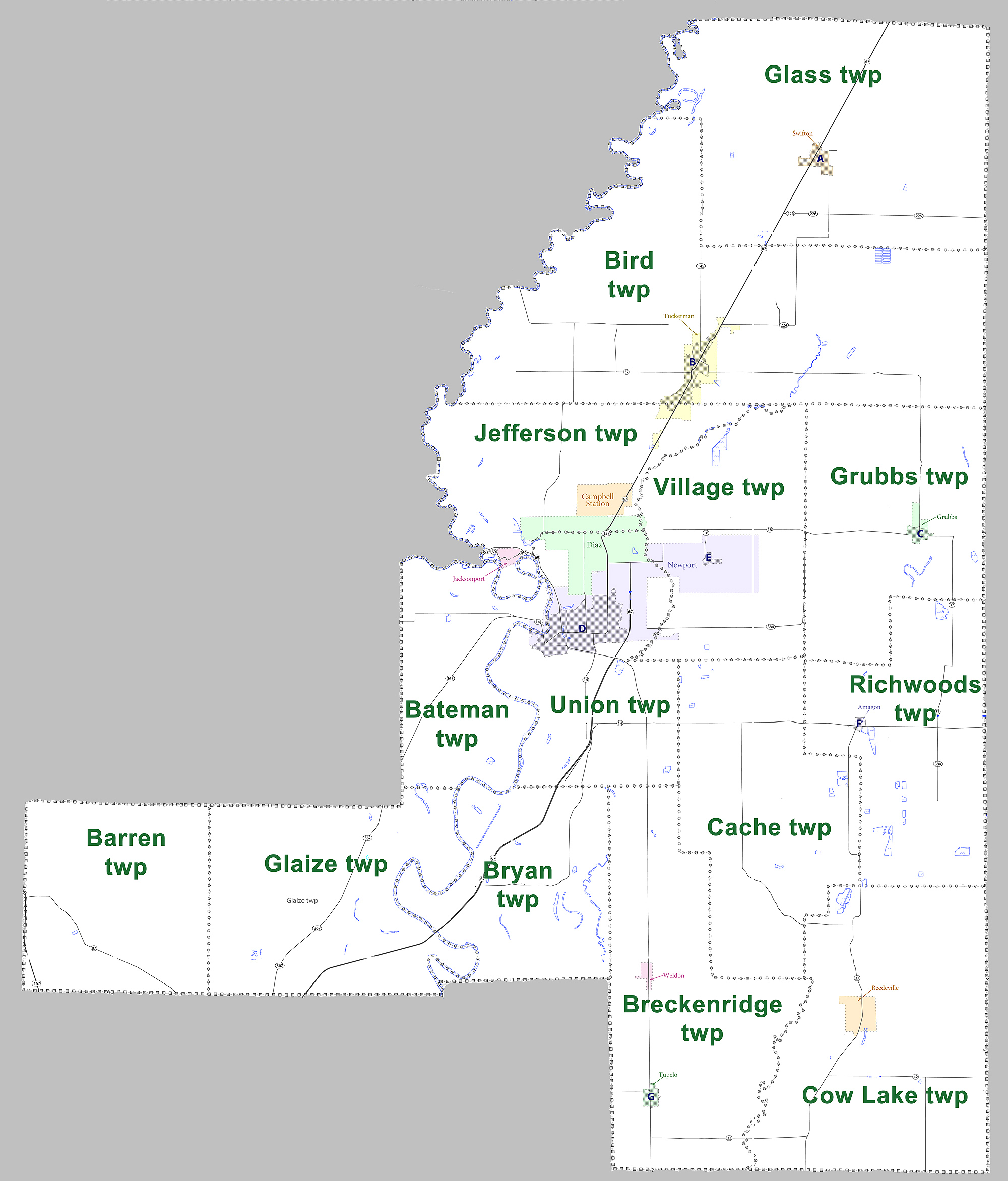
Townships in Jackson County as of 2010

According to the 2010 Census, Barren Township is located at 35°29′17″N 91°32′23″W (35.487941, -91.539853). It has a total area of 35.435 square miles (91.78 square kilometers), of which 35.422 sq mi (91.74 km^{2}) is land and 0.013 sq mi (0.034 km^{2}) is water (0.04%). As per the USGS National Elevation Dataset, the elevation is 614 feet (187 m).
