= Baker Township, Lafayette County, Arkansas =

Baker Township
- Township
- Location in Arkansas Baker Township (the United States)
- Coordinates: 33°23′26″N 93°30′24″W
- Country: United States
- State: Arkansas
- County: Lafayette

Area
  - Total: 34.739 sq mi (89.97 km^{2})
  - Land: 34.531 sq mi (89.43 km^{2})
  - Water: 0.208 sq mi (0.54 km^{2})
- Elevation: 292 ft (89 m)

Population (2010)
  - Total: 1,975
  - Density: 57.19/sq mi (22.08/km^{2})
- Time zone: UTC-6 (CST)
  - Summer (DST): UTC-5 (CDT)
- FIPS code: 05-90090
- GNIS ID: 66773

Baker Township is a township in Lafayette County, Arkansas, United States. Its total population was 1,975 as of the 2010 United States census, a decrease of 19.81 percent from 2,463 at the 2000 census.

According to the 2010 Census, Baker Township is located at 33°23′26″N 93°30′24″W (33.390496, -93.506591). It has a total area of 34.739 square miles (89.97 square kilometers); of which 34.531 sq mi (89.43 km^{2}) is land and 0.208 sq mi (0.54 km^{2}) is water (0.60%). As per the USGS National Elevation Dataset, the elevation is 292 feet (89 m).

Most of the city of Stamps is located within the township.
