= Barren Township, Independence County, Arkansas =

Barren Township
- Township
- Location in Arkansas Barren Township (the United States)
- Coordinates: 35°53′59″N 91°32′32″W
- Country: United States
- State: Arkansas
- County: Independence

Area
  - Total: 40.548 sq mi (105.02 km^{2})
  - Land: 40.456 sq mi (104.78 km^{2})
  - Water: 0.092 sq mi (0.24 km^{2})
- Elevation: 548 ft (167 m)

Population (2010)
  - Total: 1,483
  - Density: 36.66/sq mi (14.15/km^{2})
- Time zone: UTC-6 (CST)
  - Summer (DST): UTC-5 (CDT)
- FIPS code: 05-90123
- GNIS ID: 68757

Barren Township is a township in Independence County, Arkansas, United States. Its total population was 1,483 as of the 2010 United States census, an increase of 17.79 percent from 1,259 at the 2000 census.

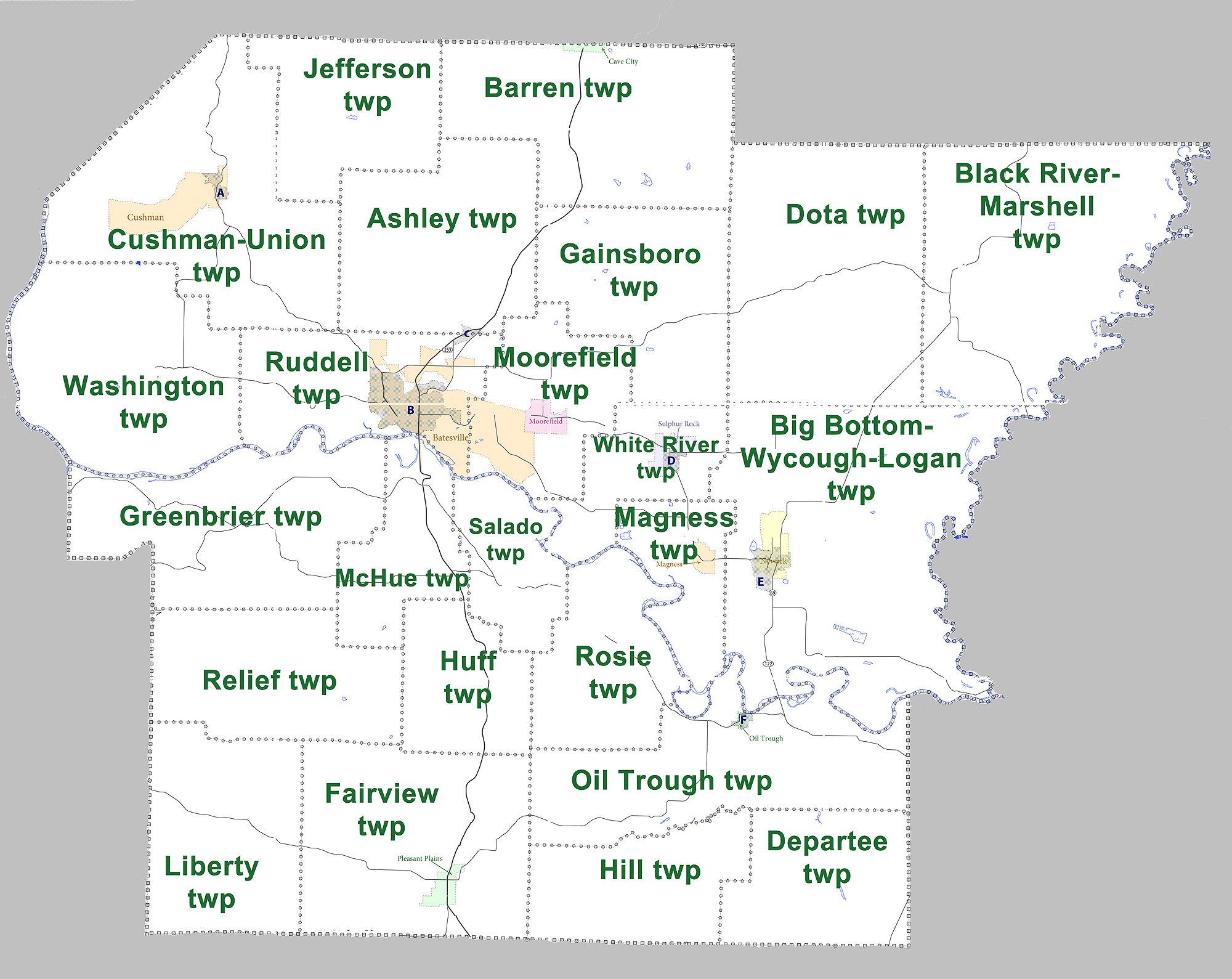
Townships in Independence County as of 2010

According to the 2010 Census, Barren Township is located at 35°53′59″N 91°32′32″W (35.899617, -91.542150). It has a total area of 40.548 square miles (105.02 square kilometers), of which 40.456 sq mi (104.78 km^{2}) is land and 0.092 sq mi (0.24 km^{2}) is water (0.23%). As per the USGS National Elevation Dataset, the elevation is 548 feet (167 m).

Part of Cave City is located within the township.
