= Banner Township, Ashley County, Arkansas =

Banner Township
- Township
- Location in Arkansas Banner Township (the United States)
- Coordinates: 33°16′55″N 91°36′25″W
- Country: United States
- State: Arkansas
- County: Ashley

Area
  - Total: 16.673 sq mi (43.18 km^{2})
  - Land: 16.383 sq mi (42.43 km^{2})
  - Water: 0.290 sq mi (0.75 km^{2})
- Elevation: 164 ft (50 m)

Population (2010)
  - Total: 158
  - Density: 9.64/sq mi (3.72/km^{2})
- Time zone: UTC-6 (CST)
  - Summer (DST): UTC-5 (CDT)
- FIPS code: 05-90102
- GNIS ID: 63671

Banner Township is a township in Ashley County, Arkansas, United States. Its total population was 158 as of the 2010 United States census, a decrease of 7.6 percent from 171 at the 2000 census.

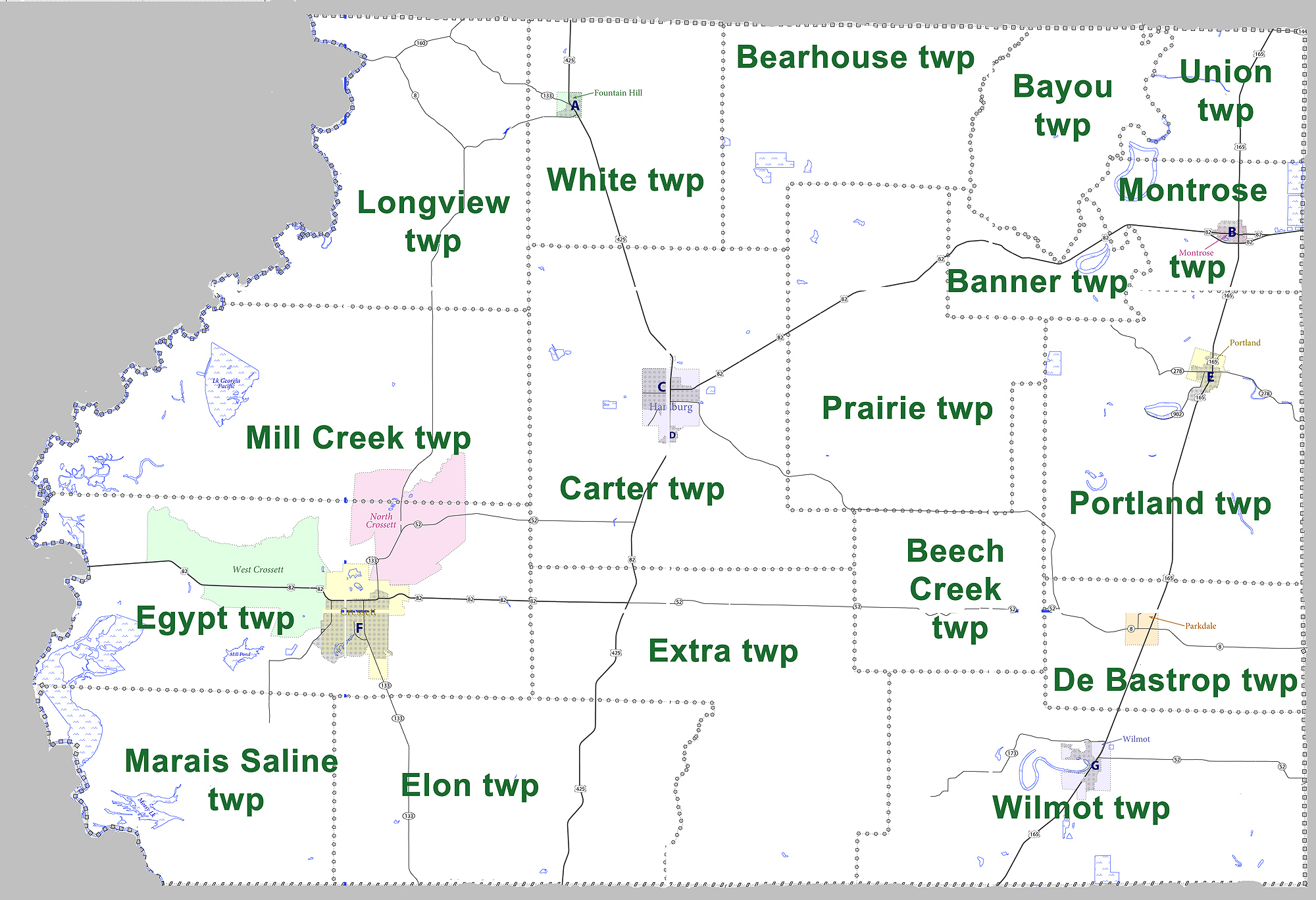
Townships in Ashley County as of 2010

According to the 2010 Census, Banner Township is located at 33°16′55″N 91°36′25″W (33.281880, -91.607009). It has a total area of 16.673 square miles (43.18 square kilometers), of which 16.383 sq mi (42.43 km^{2}) is land and 0.290 sq mi (0.75 km^{2}) is water (1.74%). As per the USGS National Elevation Dataset, the elevation is 164 feet (50 m).
