= Banner Township, Saline County, Arkansas =

Banner Township
- Township
- Location in Arkansas Banner Township (the United States)
- Coordinates: 34°32′32″N 92°17′36″W
- Country: United States
- State: Arkansas
- County: Saline

Area
  - Total: 41.151 sq mi (106.58 km^{2})
  - Land: 40.273 sq mi (104.31 km^{2})
  - Water: 0.878 sq mi (2.27 km^{2})
- Elevation: 249 ft (76 m)

Population (2010)
  - Total: 6,790
  - Density: 169/sq mi (65.1/km^{2})
- Time zone: UTC-6 (CST)
  - Summer (DST): UTC-5 (CDT)
- FIPS code: 05-90105
- GNIS ID: 66938

Banner Township is a township in Saline County, Arkansas, United States. Its total population was 6,790 as of the 2010 United States census, an increase of 22.85 percent from 5,527 at the 2000 census.

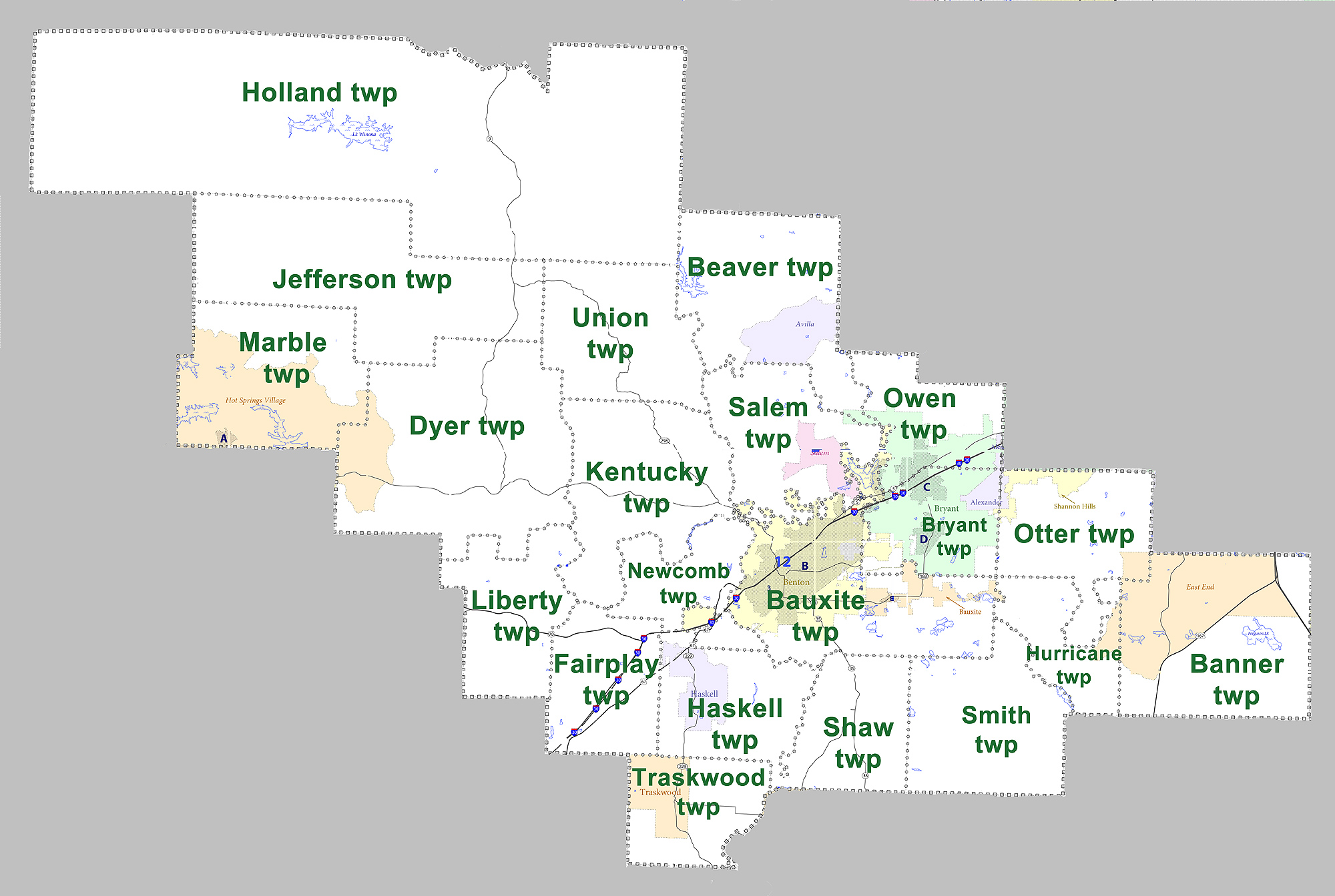
Townships in Saline County as of 2010

According to the 2010 Census, Banner Township is located at 34°32′32″N 92°17′36″W (34.542120, -92.293420). It has a total area of 41.151 square miles (106.58 square kilometers), of which 40.273 sq mi (104.31 km^{2}) is land and 0.878 sq mi (2.27 km^{2}) is water (2.13%). As per the USGS National Elevation Dataset, the elevation is 249 feet (76 m).
