= Arkansas militias during Reconstruction =

The Arkansas Militia in Reconstruction was deeply involved in the ongoing civil disturbances which plagued the state until the late 1870s. In the immediate aftermath of the Civil War, the militia was first utilized by the white population to re-establish control over the newly freed black population. Radical Republicans seized control in 1867 and abolished existing state governments and militia organizations, and disenfranchised former Confederates. The new disenfranchised whites turned to the shadow Ku Klux Klan to attempt to maintain social order. The Reconstructionist government raised a new militia, primarily of black soldiers with white officers and utilized this new "Black militia" to put down the rising power of the Ku Klux Klan. Armed conflicts between rival parties continued in several counties and the militia was called to re-establish control in Pope and Scott Counties. The most severe conflict of this period occurred during the so-called Brooks–Baxter War with rival parties, with supporting militias, battling for control of the governorship. With the end of reconstruction one of the first acts of the new resurgent Democratic state legislature was to abolish the office of adjutant general in retaliation for the use of the militia to enforce the rule of the Reconstruction government.

== Federal occupation 1863 ==
After the fall of Little Rock in September 1863, a pro-Union government was established in Federally occupied Arkansas, under Isaac Murphy. Governor Murphy appointed Albert W. Bishop, former lieutenant colonel of the Union 1st Arkansas Cavalry, as adjutant general. Murphy and Bishop established a pro-Union state militia organization. Immediately following the official end of the Civil War in the summer of 1865, white southerners began to repopulate the local militia and insurgent groups. They worked to re-establish white control over the newly freed African Americans. In some areas, white militia groups tried to disarm returning black Union veterans.

When the Radical Republicans gained control of Congress in 1867, they abolished the former confederate state governments because of their actions against freedmen. They formed military districts, and authorized federal military supervision until the states rewrote their constitutions to include the reconstruction platform of suffrage and citizenship for freedman. Former Union General Powell Clayton, a Republican who had long lived in Arkansas, was elected as the new governor in the same election in which Arkansas adopted its new constitution. The new constitution temporarily disenfranchised former confederates, forbidding them from voting and holding office. Many Confederate veterans joined chapters of the growing Ku Klux Klan, which started in Tennessee. They attacked blacks and freedmen sympathizers, working to suppress black voting and mobility.

== Suppression of the Ku Klux Klan ==
Following the Civil War, Congress passed two laws in 1867 that impacted upon the militia. The first was an act which dissolved all existing Confederate-state governments and placed the states under the control of the occupying Federal forces, and the second, passed on March 2, 1867, abolished the various southern militia organizations. Most white males who had participated in the late rebellion were now disqualified to vote, so Radical Republican candidates won all state offices and most seats in the legislature. The newly elected Governor Powell Clayton succeeded in getting Congress to reauthorize militia organizations in states with pro-Union governments re-established.

The Republican-controlled legislature passed an act to reorganize the state militia on July 14, 1868. General Keyes Danforth was appointed adjutant general and he set about raising militia units composed of black soldiers. In October 1868, the adjutant general could count 37 militia companies totaling 1600 men, the majority of which were black, in the newly formed Arkansas State Guard.

This new militia was to spend much of the coming year battling Ku Klux Klan activity in three of the state's four militia districts. Governor Powell declared Martial Law and militia forces seized the town of Center Point in the southwest and took 60 prisoners on November 12, 1868. The militia made several arrests in Hamburg in the southeastern district. The militia under General Daniel Phillips Upham killed and captured several in an engagement against Klansmen in Augusta in the Northeastern District. Also in the Northeastern District, Marianna was occupied with five captured and near Jonesboro one was killed and three captured. In Fulton County, the militia captured two men. Klan activity seems to have been successfully suppressed for the time being because martial law was lifted in 1869.

== Pope County Militia War ==
During the Reconstruction era, Pope County in west-central Arkansas, was the scene of several assassinations of public officials.

A period of a little over seven months in 1872 and 1873 came to be known as the Pope County Militia War. However, there were no skirmishes or battles, no engagements between organized opponents of any kind. Instead, it was an unsettled period of conflict, similar to what the county had seen during the war, where a few leaders and their men exerted unrestrained control over the county. In Pope County, those leaders were the county clerk, the sheriff, a sheriff's deputy, and the superintendent of schools. Knowing that they would be replaced in a fair election, they sought to have martial law replace civil process so that they could control the outcome.

In July 1872, a sheriff's posse arrested men alleged to have attempted to assassinate a sheriff's deputy but the posse subsequently murdered two of its prisoners and attempted to murder two others. Pope County's sheriff and county clerk appealed in person to Governor Ozra A. Hadley for a declaration of martial law but, instead, Hadley sent General Albert W. Bishop to the county to investigate. In September, the sheriff's deputy, after being mortally wounded, confessed that the attempted assassination had been staged.

After County Clerk Wallace H. Hickox was killed and threats to burn the county seat, Dover, continued, Major General D. P. Upham was sent by the governor to provide aid in Pope County "as is or may be necessary to execute the civil and criminal law of the state." The orders gave Upham discretionary power in the use of force and the power to call state guards and enrolled militia into service. Some state guards were utilized in the county during voter registration and the November general election but were dismissed to return home after the election.

In September, a New York Herald reporter wrote, "it is martial law without the name and outlawry in fact."

In February 1873, Captain George R. Herriot of the state guard, during a physical altercation, was murdered by a third party at the county courthouse, but his killer was never brought to trial. Herriot had been in Dover as a witness for a court hearing over a contested election for sheriff that had taken place when his state guard unit had been in Pope County.

== Brooks–Baxter War ==
In the state election of 1872, Joseph Brooks represented the Liberal Republicans and Elisha Baxter represented the old Radical Republicans. In a contested election, the legislature reviewed the returns and declared Baxter the winner, but on April 12, 1874, over a year after Baxter took office, a judge declared Brooks to be the winner. Governor Baxter was forcibly evicted from the statehouse by Brooks and an armed group of supporters. In the confusion that followed, both "governors" called on the militia for support, and both received it. The pro-Baxter militia forces were led by former Confederate General Robert C. Newton. Pro-Brooks militia forces were led by former Union General Robert Francis Catterson and former Confederate General James Fleming Fagan. Brooks maintained control of the statehouse, and Baxter established a headquarters nearby in the Anthony House. One man was killed in fighting that erupted along Markham Street on April 16, 1874. Baxter managed to raise over 1,300 troops, while Brooks secured more than 2000 rifles for his supporters. With orders from Washington DC to prevent a clash, Colonel Thomas E. Rose, commander at the Little Rock Arsenal, deployed U.S. regulars from the Sixteenth Infantry, plus two pieces of artillery on Markham Street, between the parties. As violence continued, Federal Troops erected a barricade along Markham Street between the warring factions to prevent further encounters.

Hostilities quickly spread to other parts of the state. Nine Brooks supporters were killed and thirty wounded in an ambush set by Baxter forces at New Gascony in Jefferson County, south of Pine Bluff. Engagements between the two sides also occurred on May 1 in Lincoln and Arkansas counties, and two days later, they fought another battle near Arkansas Post (Arkansas County), killing five more men.

On May 8, Brooks men ambushed a steamboat, the Hallie, and a company of pro-Baxter militia near Palarm Creek, south of present day Mayflower, on the Arkansas River. The boat was captured by Brooks forces but was eventually sunk by Baxter supporters.

Baxter forces occupied Argenta (present day North Little Rock) across the river from the statehouse and kept up a steady stream of sniper fire on Brooks forces at the statehouse. Brooks forces eventually declared that unless the sniping was stopped, they would shell the city of Argenta with the two six pounder cannon present at the statehouse.

On May 13, 1874, a four-hour skirmish was fought near the site of the present state capital. Pro-Baxter militia had arrived by steamboat from Fort Smith and they were intercepted by pro-Brooks forces. The number of casualties from this engagement is unknown.

Both sides appealed to President Ulysses S. Grant for aid and on May 15, 1874, Grant recognized Baxter as the governor and ordered all "turbulent and disorderly persons to disperse and return to their homes". By May 16, Brooks supporters disbanded and began returning home. The total number of casualties in this political war is estimated at above 200.

== The Waldron War ==
Armed conflict between warring factions broke out in Waldron, Scott County, in West Central Arkansas in the Summer of 1875. Governor Garland and eventually Governor Miller used the state militia forces to maintain peace, with up to seven companies of militia stationed in the county in 1877 and 1878. Eventually, tensions between local militias rose to the point that Adjutant General James Pomeroy "took up his residence at Waldron", directing the militias and ensuring an orderly term of the circuit court in the spring of 1878. By then, the political pendulum had swung, Reconstruction was over, and the new state legislature, now back firmly in the control of the previously disenfranchised Democrats, objected to the governor's use of the militia in what the legislature saw as a local issue. The reaction was so severe that in March 1879, the legislature, over the governor's veto, enacted a law abolishing the office of adjutant general:

Act No. XLIX

An Act to Abolish the Office of Adjutant General and for other purposes.

Section 1– Governor's Private Secretary required to perform duties of Adjutant General and Salry [sic?]

Section 2– Office of the Adjutant General Abolished

BE IT ENACTED BY THE GENERAL ASSEMBLY OF THE STATE OF ARKANSAS:

SECTION 1.

That from and after the passage of this act, the Governor’s Private Secretary shall perform all the duties now performed by the Adjutant General, and shall receive a salary of $1600.00 per annum, for his services as such Private Secretary and Adjutant General.

SECTION 2.

Be it further enacted, that the office of Adjutant General be, and the same is hereby abolished, and that this act take effect and be enforce from and after its' [sic?] passage: and that all laws, and parts of laws, in conflict with this act be and the same are hereby repealed.

This bill having been returned by the Governor, with his objections thereto, and, after reconsideration having passed both houses by the constitutional majority, it has become a law this 11th day of March 1879.

J.T. Bearded, Speaker of the House

M.M. Duffie, President of the Senate

In addition to abolishing the office of adjutant general, the legislature also cut all funding for the militia. Despite the efforts of each succeeding governor, this situation continued for over twenty eight years, until 1907 when the legislature finally reauthorized the office of adjutant general.
