= Jacob L. Shinn =

American businessman and politician (1826–1899)

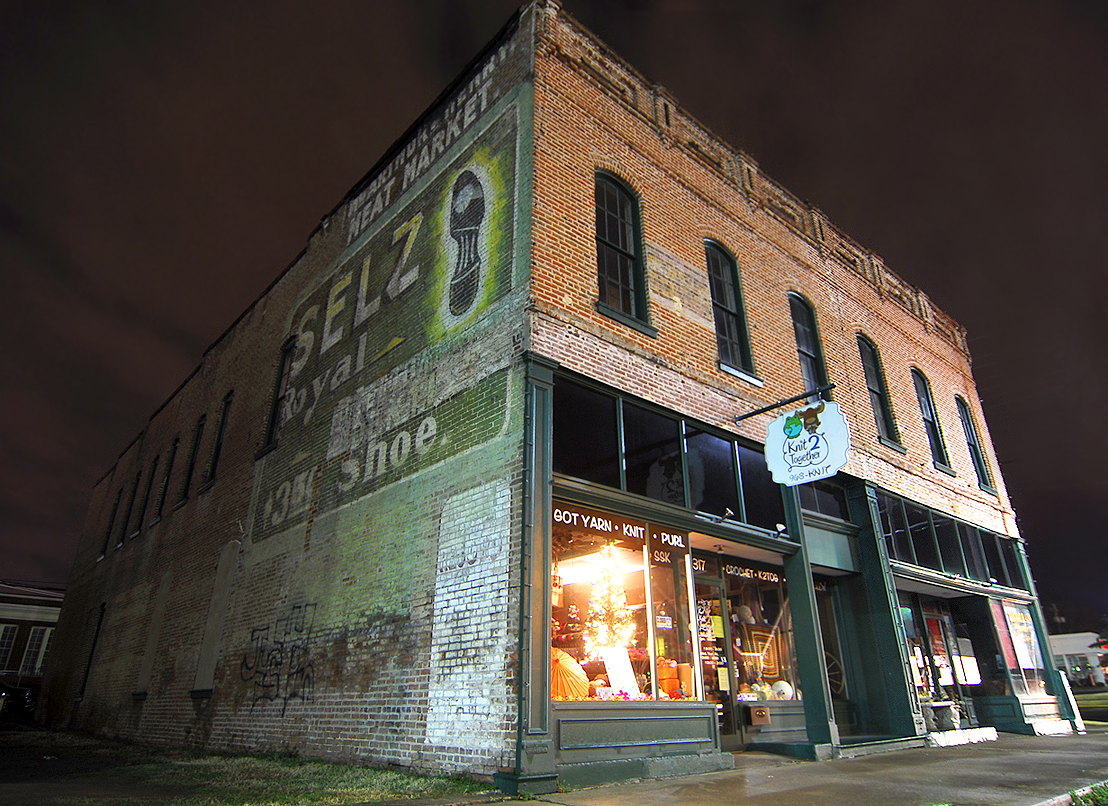
Completed in 1876 and home to Jacob Shinn's mercantile business, the Shinn Building is the oldest building in Russellville and its first brick building.

Jacob Lawson Shinn (October 3, 1826—August 17, 1899) was a prosperous and influential mid to late-nineteenth-century leader in Russellville, Pope County, Arkansas. A successful merchant who established his first store in about 1852, Shinn was instrumental in bringing the Little Rock and Fort Smith Railroad (LR&FS) through town and moving the county seat from Dover to Russellville. At one time the wealthiest man and largest property owner in Pope County, he donated land for a railway station and right-of-way through Russellville for the LR&FS railroad as well as property for the new courthouse, the Russellville school system, and the church that he and his wife attended. After financial setbacks that drastically reduced his wealth, Shinn continued his service to the community until he died in office, months after being elected mayor of Russellville.

== Migration ==
In 1837, Shinn's family, along with relatives and friends, traveled from Montgomery County, North Carolina, by covered wagon when Jacob was 10 years old, settling near what would become Russellville. His father, Benjamin Daniel Ransom "B.D.R." Shinn, established a farm and, in 1840, one of the first circular sawmills in Pope County, working as a farmer and lumber dealer until his death.

== Mexican War ==
Following the outbreak of war with Mexico, Jacob Shinn enlisted as a corporal in a company of mounted infantry volunteers from Pope County organized under Captain James S. "Symp" Moffit, in Archibald Yell's Arkansas Mounted Rifles, the unit mustering into federal service at Washington, Arkansas on July 1, 1846, as Company A. The regiment participated in the occupation of several locations in Mexico and in the Battle of Buena Vista. The commander of the invading American Army, General John E. Wool, derisively called Yell's regiment the "Arkansas Mounted Devils" over issues such as military order and basic sanitation as most of the regiment did not regularly drill and military discipline was extremely lax. Jacob, by then a sergeant, was mustered out on June 20, 1847, at Camargo, Mexico, on the Rio Grande, and made his way home.

== Russellville ==
Local tradition holds that the naming of the community came down to a choice between Shinnsville, after merchant Jacob Shinn, and Russellville, after Thomas Russell. However, Russellville was actually named in the early 1840s when Jacob was a teen. Russellville is listed on mail routes in multiple requests for proposals for carrying the mail, including as early as 1842, when Shinn was 15, and, later, 1846, when he was 19, so naming the community after Jacob would have been quite unlikely. In the 1840s, his uncle, James Madison Shinn, and father, B. D. R. Shinn, operated a store in the small frontier community. Any truth in the naming tradition may apply to them.

Jacob went to work in his uncle's and father's store in Russellville in 1848 after returning home from the war in Mexico.

Early in 1850, Shinn's father went to California and did not return until the summer of 1851. While he was gone, Jacob managed the family farm where he is recorded as living with his mother and eight siblings in the 1850 census, owning real estate valued at $200.

== Merchant, entrepreneur, and local philanthropist ==
In 1852, with a cash capital of $500, Jacob Shinn established one of the first general stores in an area known as Chactas Prairie, just down the road from the log home of Thomas Russell, the area's first doctor.

On July 4, 1855, Shinn married Martha Battenfield. They had four sons.

Shinn was appointed Russellville postmaster on August 4, 1857, and, after the war, was re-established as postmaster on August 6, 1866. By 1858, Shinn's inventory was valued at $2,000, more than twice the average inventory of the eighteen stores taxed in Pope County that year. In 1860, Shinn was documented as a merchant with $3000 in real estate and $25,000 in personal property.

=== Civil War and Reconstruction ===
Shinn took no active part in the Civil War and, like many merchants in the South, suffered significant reverses. Like many, he was opposed to the secession of Arkansas. Shinn and his family may have relocated during the war. The youngest son, Charles, was born "in Youngstown, Ohio, in June 1864."

Shinn was a passenger on the steamer American when it struck a snag on the port bow at about 10 P.M. on January 27, 1870. The snag was a known navigational hazard about 24 miles above Little Rock, and the boat was running at a slow bell to pass it. However, the high flow and level in the river had shifted the snag's position somewhat. The collision stoved in the steamer's port side. She sank almost immediately into fifteen feet of water. Within three minutes of striking, the water was waist-deep in the cabin. Shinn finished his journey home by stage.

During a portion of the Pope County militia troubles in 1872, Shinn took refuge in Little Rock as did his brother-in-law, Joseph H. Battenfield, whose newspaper office, including press, had been burned by the sheriff's militia.

After Pope County Clerk Wallace H. Hickox was killed in Dover on August 31, 1872, Shinn traveled with an eyewitness of the killing, Rev. J. M. P. Hickerson, to Little Rock where Shinn met with Governor O. A. Hadley on September 4 and arranged a meeting between Hadley and Hickerson. Reports said that Frank Hickox, a brother of the slain clerk and another man, waylaid the stage between Russellville and Perry Station, at that time the furthest west terminus of the Little Rock & Fort Smith Railroad, thinking to find Hickerson, remove him from the stage, and prevent him from seeing the Governor. Shinn and Hickerson bypassed Perry Station and traveled on horseback to Lewisburg, where they took the train.

=== The new store ===
Shinn opened a larger store in a new two-story brick building on Main Street in 1876, with other businesses occupying offices on the second floor, The older, smaller store stayed open during construction after being "rolled back" on the property to make room for the new building on the original location. The building was the first brick building built in town and, currently, is the oldest surviving building in Russellville.

=== Property owner and developer ===
For a time, Shinn was the largest land owner in Pope County, with holdings of several thousand acres. He was also a property developer in Russellville, with the J. L. Shinn Addition in eastern Russellville bearing his name to this day.

=== The Russellville Democrat ===
In the 1870s, a group of affluent Russellville leaders, including Shinn, organized as the Russellville Printing and Publishing Association and established The Russellville Democrat, a weekly newspaper that assured its readers in its January 28, 1875, inaugural issue that "it is placed on a firm basis and will be a permanent thing." Initially a weekly four-page newspaper, through consolidations and name changes, it evolved into a daily paper that today is The Courier.

=== Little Rock & Fort Smith Railroad ===
One of the earliest promoters and, in 1867, one of the directors, and vice-president in 1868, of the LR&FS Railroad, Shinn donated land for a railway station and right-of-way through Russellville. Much of the growth of Russellville can be attributed to the railroad with many of the business people of Norristown and Dover moving to Russellville.

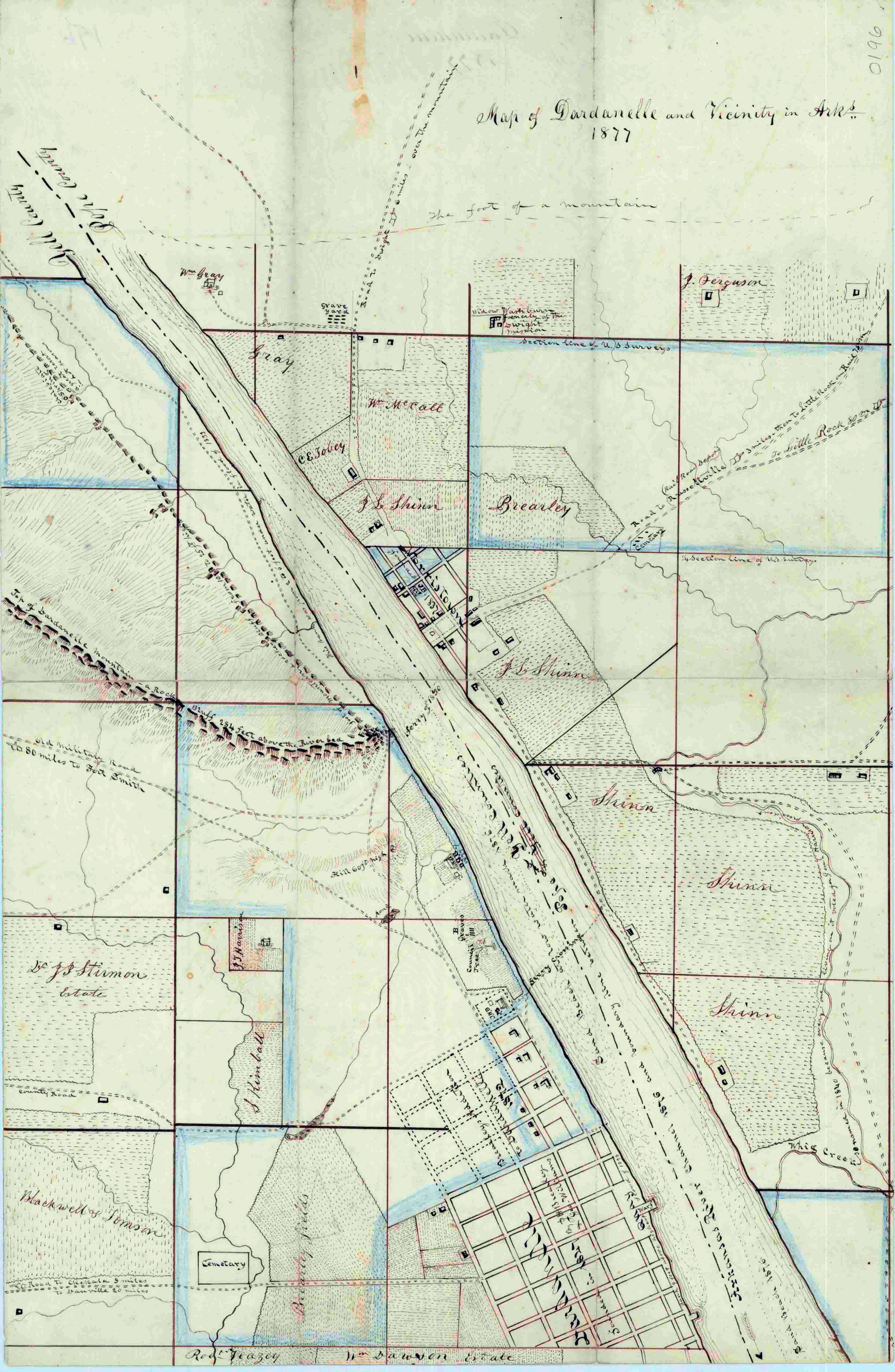
1877 colored, hand-drawn 11"x17" map showing the 1830 ferry crossing from Norristown to the base of Dardanelle Rock and the 1870s ferry crossing at Dardanelle. Also shown is the old military road between Little Rock and Fort Smith and the freight road to the LR&FS depot in Russellville.

=== Ferry at Dardanelle ===
One of the businesses that Jacob Shinn owned was a ferry at the crossing at Dardanelle. Progress, competition, and the nature of steamboats and the river made this one of his more challenging endeavors. One boat was lost on August 16, 1875, when a steam boiler exploded. Another burned on April 1, 1881. Eventually, the construction of a floating bridge rendered his ferry obsolete.

In 1877, a temporary injunction was granted in Shinn's favor restraining another business from Dardanelle from operating a competing ferry. Jacob Shinn bought out the entire interest of the other company the next year, eliminating the competition, The steam ferryboat Oasis, built in Little Rock, went into service between Dardanelle and Norristown in August 1878.

A notice in The Russellville Democrat of September 30, 1880, announced that Shinn would "soon start the steam ferry again between Dardanelle and Norristown."

A month after the ferry burned in 1881, a contract had been let for it to be rebuilt according to the Russellville newspaper. That same issue of the paper reported that a license granted by Pope County had reduced the ferry rates to

- $1—six-horse wagon
- 75¢—four-horse wagon
- 50¢—two-horse wagon
- 25¢—buggy, or one-horse cart
- 15¢—man and horse
- 5¢—foot-man
- 5¢—per head for led or loose stock

Shinn also invested in a railroad venture that would have run between Russellville and North Dardanelle. On June 22, 1880, articles of association and incorporation were filed with a capital stock of $35,000. One of five directors, he was the majority shareholder with fifty shares. Each of the other directors held ten shares. However, the venture was never pursued and others invested in what became the short line Dardanelle and Russellville Railroad (D&RR). Shinn did grant D&RR the right to run across lands that he owned in Pope County. A 4.8-mile (7.7 km) shortline that still exists, D&RR runs from Russellville to the north bank of the Arkansas River at North Dardanelle, across from Dardanelle, Arkansas. D&RR train operations began on August 15, 1883. as did a ten-year contract between DR&R and Shinn for transportation of their freight and passengers over the river via the ferry.

In 1882, a new ferryboat had been built in Little Rock.

Another new steam ferryboat, Martha, at that time one of the largest in Arkansas and captained by Shinn's son, Edgar, was built in Murraysville, Ohio, and arrived at Dardanelle on September 26, 1883. Shinn's youngest son, Charles, also worked on the boat, which cost $20,000 to build. She was capable of operating during high flows, "riding the mad waters in spite of the swift current and heavy driftwood," though her trips were less often than at low water. The crossing at Dardanelle was considered to be one of the hardest places to ferry from its source to its mouth.

Together, the ferry and the shortline railroad provided a transportation link for the crops south of the river—at that time, largely cotton—to the railroad freight depot in Russellville.

In 1885, a dispute arose between D&RR and Shinn over payment for the conveyance of baggage, mail, and empty wagons over the ferry. Shinn won the case in circuit court and the ruling was affirmed by the Arkansas Supreme Court in 1889.

The opening of the Dardanelle pontoon bridge in early 1891 rendered Shinn's ferry service obsolete. However, in April, the bridge washed away during high flows and flooding on the river. For a time, the ferry steamer Martha returned to service.

=== First Christian Church ===
Russellville's First Christian Church sits on land that was once owned by Shinn where the congregation had enjoyed picnics in a grove of trees. Shinn was a charter member and was selected, by lot, as one of the first deacons when the church was formally organized on January 29, 1882. The following September, the membership resolved to "erect the very best edifice they can for the worship of God." The unassuming church building that exists to this day began as a single-story wooden structure built in 1885 after the congregation had met in the Masonic Hall for three years. After the construction loan was paid off, Jacob and Martha Shinn turned the deed to the property over to the congregation on February 28, 1889. One of the fourteen large Gothic stained glass windows has "Mr. & Mrs. J. L. Shinn" inscribed on the lower portion of the window.

=== County seat move from Dover to Russellville ===
After the LR&FS railroad was completed through Russellville, Shinn was very involved in the effort to move the county seat from Dover to Russellville, which succeeded, after several attempts, in 1887. On March 19, 1887, an election was held on whether to move the county seat to Russellville or to Atkins. Russellville was selected by a margin of 128 votes out of 2,670 total votes cast.

As an incentive for the move of the county seat to Russellville, Shinn and 15 other men provided a $50,000 bond for the construction of a new courthouse and jail within 12 months at no cost to the county or taxpayers on city center lots donated by Shinn. A similar bond was also offered by leaders in Atkins.

=== Public school system ===
Along with his other civic accomplishments, Shinn was a sponsor of the city's first public school system, donating sixteen lots and building a school. He was a member of the school board for many years up until his death.

=== Melrose Cotton Mill ===
Shinn was the president of the Melrose Manufacturing Company, established in 1882, which owned and operated a cotton mill one-quarter mile east of downtown Russellville that manufactured rope, twine, and yarn. While the mill operated for several years, interest accumulating on a large debt incurred by construction and equipment purchases consumed the plant's profits and sapped its financial strength. Shortages of fuel for the steam boiler and barrels for shipping its products of rope and twine halted operation several times. A fire in December 1888 destroyed machinery and products, completely halting production, though the mill was subsequently rebuilt and equipment replaced. In January 1891, a sale of the mortgage transferred ownership of the mill to parties outside of Arkansas, with the mill equipment eventually shipped to New Hampshire and many local citizens losing their investment.

With the failure of the Melrose Cotton Milling Company, Jacob Shinn suffered a financial loss of nearly $60,000, with a continuing decline in his wealth in subsequent years.

=== Dispute over Dardanelle pontoon bridge ===
In 1890, Jacob and Ed Shinn filed for an injunction to prevent the Dardanelle Pontoon Bridge Company from building a bridge across the Arkansas River at Dardanelle. The subsequent construction of the Dardanelle pontoon bridge rendered Shinns' ferry obsolete. Shinn later sued for damages and, in winning, was awarded $5,612—equivalent to about $186,500 in 2023 dollars—enough to bankrupt the pontoon company. The pontoon company was subsequently sold to raise enough money pay Shinn. Even with the court award, the loss of the ferry business was a financial setback.

=== Mayor ===
Nominated mayor of Russellville on March 6, 1899—and subsequently elected—Jacob L. Shinn died at the age of 72 of typhoid fever just five months later.
