= Joseph H. Battenfield =

American newspaper publisher and merchant

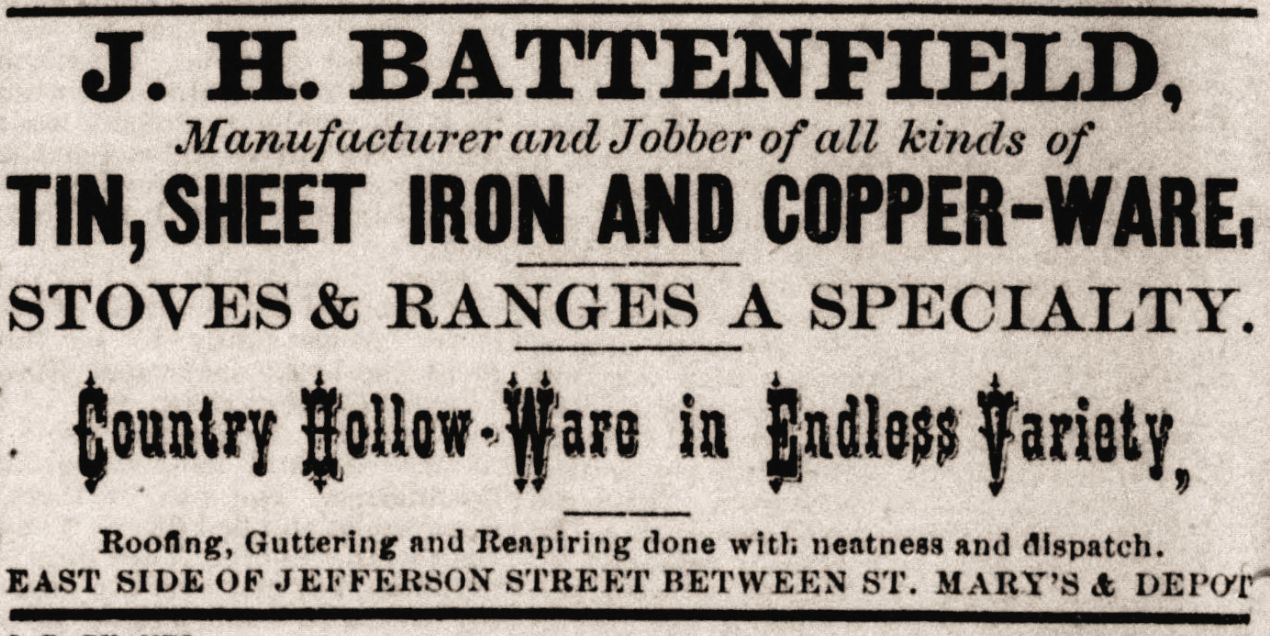

Joseph H. Battenfield (June 1848 – June 29, 1909) was an American newspaper publisher and merchant based in Russellville, Arkansas, in the years after the American Civil War. His weekly newspaper regularly took local officials to task over what he saw as the plundering of county wealth and published details of unwarranted attempts by county officials to get martial law declared in Pope County. On September 8, 1872, during a period that came to be known as the Pope County Militia War, his newspaper office and press were burned, supposedly by the militia of Sheriff Elisha Dodson.

== Civil War ==
Battenfield's family had moved from Ohio to Northwest Arkansas in 1853 when Joseph was just four or five years old. At some point after 1860, they relocated from Arkansas to Youngstown, Ohio as did Joseph's older sister, Martha and her husband, Jacob L. Shinn. While in Ohio, Joseph enlisted in Company G of the 6th Regiment, Ohio Cavalry, on March 13, 1865, giving his age as 18. He mustered out with the company on August 7, 1865.

== Merchant and newspaper publisher ==
In 1870, at age 22, Battenfield was a hardware merchant in Russellville, with $2,500 in real estate and his personal estate valued at $4,000, possibly, in part, through the influence and guidance of his brother-in-law, Jacob L. Shinn, a wealthy local merchant—"the chief merchant of the county" according to George Alfred Townsend of the Chicago Tribune in an October 15, 1872, article.

Battenfield established The Tribune, a weekly newspaper, in Russellville in March 1870. The name was changed to the National Tribune in July 1871. At about the same time, Battenfield withdrew from editorial control and was succeeded by B. F. Jobe.

=== Pope County militia troubles ===
A fire on February 6, 1872, destroyed a store belonging to Joseph Battenfield. Losses included a large stock of general hardware, wood and willowware, and tinner's tools and stock. The loss was estimated at $7,800, with $5,000 covered by insurance. Battenfield ascribed the fire as reprisal for his publishing facts about the plundering of the county by county officials, Sheriff Elisha W. Dodson, Deputy Sheriff John H. Williams, School Superintendent W. A. Stuart, and County Clerk Wallace H. Hickox.

In July 1872, Battenfield's National Tribune published accounts of a botched conspiracy—where two men were murdered and two others escaped—by county officials in an attempt to show that circumstances were dangerous in Pope County and get martial law declared by Governor O. A. Hadley.

Depositions implicating Sheriff Dodson and his posse with murder were published by the National Tribune and, subsequently, republished in other papers. Hickox, Williams, and Stuart were also implicated in the depositions—made before the mayor of Dover— by William Hale, who was mortally wounded in a July 8, 1872, incident at Shiloh Creek and Isham L. West, who escaped without injury. One other man, N. J. Hale, William Hale's father, also escaped without injury and a fourth man, Joe Tucker died on the scene.

The National Tribune office and printing machinery were destroyed by fire on September 8, 1872, during what became known as the Pope County Militia War.

In a late September 1872, interview in Little Rock, Townsend asked, "Mr. Battenfeld (sic), have you any reasonable doubt that the Minstrel militia burned your office?"

Battenfield replied, "No citizen of Russellville entertains the least doubt of it. Their proposition was to have me hasten to my office when the flames burst out, and then shoot me down, so as to prevent effectually any revival of the paper. I kept in the house, and did not venture out." After relating another attempt on him while he was playing billiards the next day, he said, Before he could make another attempt, I got out through the back door, and took no further chances... I went over to Dardanelle for refuge, and am now at Little Rock."

The paper is conservative, and through its columns its editor dared to express his sentiments in a manner not complementary to Sheriff Dodson, or the State officials who appointed Dodson and are sustaining him in his lawless acts. The Tribune office was threatened with destruction, and the threat has been executed.

The newspaper was revived and was published under several different managements until July 1874.

== Tinner, mayor, railroad venture, and land office register ==
A notice was given in 1875 that the firm of Battenfield & Fowler was dissolved. In 1880, Joseph is recorded working as a "tinner." He opened a new "stove and tinshop" that summer.

On April 2, 1878, Battenfield was elected mayor of Russellville. He was defeated in the April 1, 1879, election.

In 1880, Battenfield was one of the five investors and directors in a railroad venture that would have run between Russellville and North Dardanelle. On June 22, 1880, articles of association and incorporation were filed for a railroad from Russellville to Dardanelle with a capital stock of $35,000. However, the venture was never pursued and others invested in what became the short line Dardanelle and Russellville Railroad (D&RR). To this day, D&RR operates a 4.8-mile (7.7 km) line from Russellville, where it interchanges with Union Pacific, to North Dardanelle, across the Arkansas River from Dardanelle, Arkansas.

Battenfield was Adjutant of the E. M. Stanton Post No. 68, G.A.R. in 1889.

In the 1890s, Battenfield was appointed Register for the Dardanelle DistrictUnited States General Land Office. District land offices were the basic operating units that conducted the business of transferring title from the public domain to other parties, such as homesteaders. The "register" was the top official for a district land office. Registers were nominated by the president and approved by the Senate. The Dardanelle District included the following counties: Conway, Crawford, Franklin, Garland, Johnson, Logan, Montgomery, Perry, Polk, Pope, Saline, Scott, Sebastian, and Yell. Battenfield served as register from 1897 until the Dardanelle Land Office was consolidated with the Little Rock office on January 30, 1909.
