= Dardanelle pontoon bridge =

Historic floating bridge in Arkansas, US

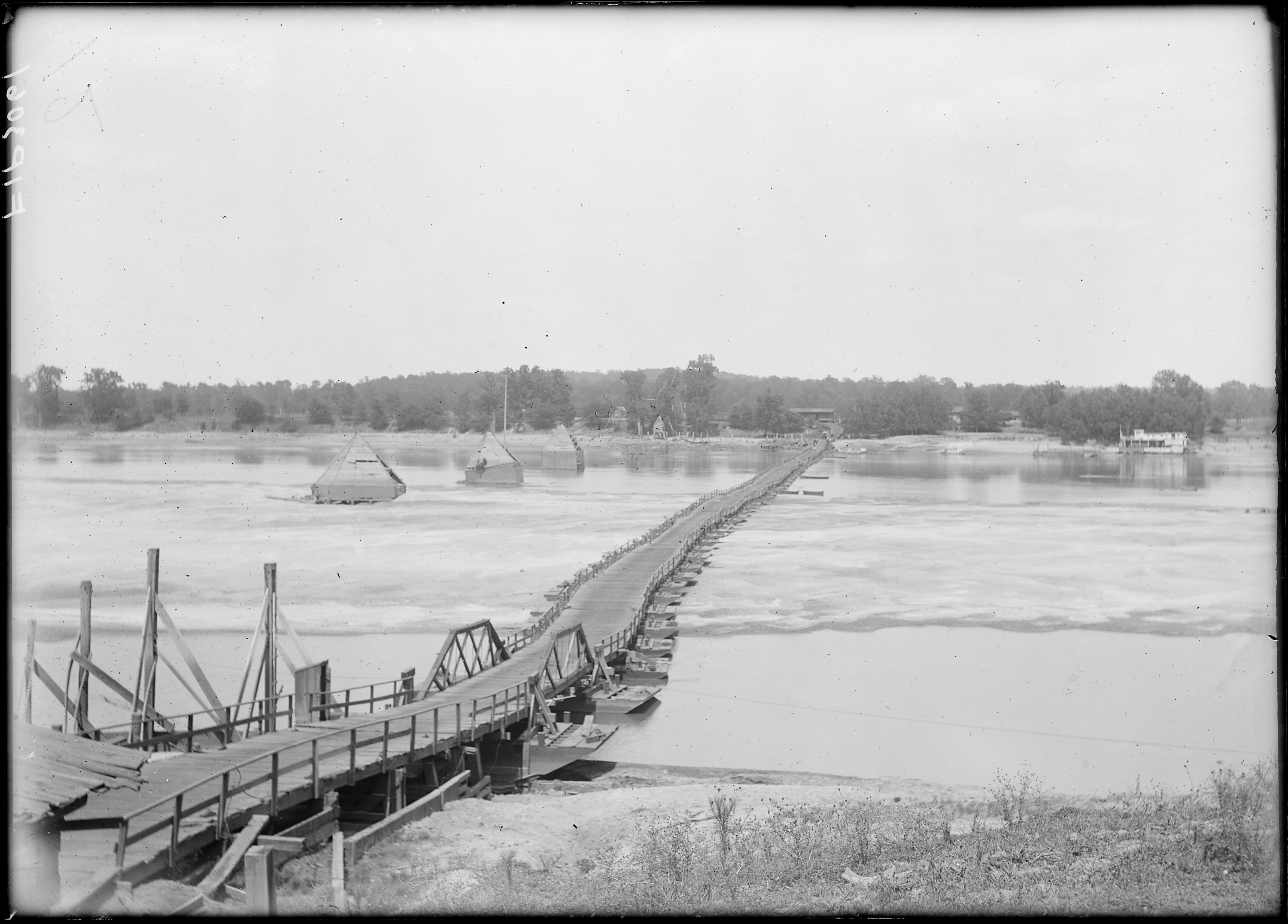
- Operated for nearly 4 decades in the late 19th and early 20th century, the Dardanelle pontoon bridge was the only bridge crossing the Arkansas River between Dardanelle and Fort Smith for most of the time it existed. (The longest pontoon bridge in the world... —National Archives and Records Administration NARA).
- Coordinates: 35°13′28″N 93°09′00″W
- Crosses: Arkansas River
- Locale: Dardanelle, Arkansas

Characteristics
- Design: Pontoon bridge
- Total length: 2,065 feet (629 m) bank to bank, 800 yards (730 m) with run-ways
- Width: 18 feet (5.5 m)
- Traversable?: Yes
- Piers in water: 72–80 pontoon boats
- Load limit: 9,000 pounds (4,100 kg)

History
- Constructed by: Dardanelle Pontoon Bridge and Turnpike Company
- Construction start: 1891
- Opened: April 1, 1891
- Rebuilt: Many times
- Closed: January 17, 1929
- Replaced by: Highway 7 Bridge

Statistics
- Toll: 5–75 cents, depending on transportation mode

Location
- Interactive map of Dardanelle pontoon bridge

The Dardanelle pontoon bridge was a floating bridge on the Arkansas River connecting Pope and Yell counties at Dardanelle, Arkansas. The bridge was used for nearly four decades in the late 19th and early 20th centuries, except for periods when its operation was interrupted by high river flows or other disruptions.

== Description ==
Called an "extremely interesting structure" by Scientific American in August 1922, the pontoon bridge was the first bridge built at the Dardanelle crossing on the old 1820s military road between Little Rock to Fort Gibson in the Indian Territory. The military road, which had also served as a post road and a route for travelers, had been designated by 1871 Arkansas legislation as a public highway under the jurisdiction of individual county governments. Before the pontoon bridge, the crossing in the Dardanelle area had previously been serviced by ferries. Until a bridge was erected at Morrilton in 1918, the Dardanelle bridge was the only one crossing the Arkansas River between Little Rock and Fort Smith.

According to the 1922 Scientific American article,

The bridge is 2065 feet long from bank to bank, but the run-ways at each end will bring the distance from end to end to nearly 800 yards... There are 72 pontoon boats in the bridge, spaced 24 feet from center to center.

The dimensions of each pontoon boat are: depth, 36 inches; width, 12 feet; length, 28 feet. The boats are coupled in sections, six boats to a section. There are nine sections and all may be easily moved to the edge of the river when a storm is seen approaching, or repair work is needed quickly. A steamboat is maintained by the company owning the bridge to remove the draw section and permit other boats to pass, or to tow the bridge to the bank when driftwood is heavy or the river high. The steamboat is used as a ferry when the bridge is not in use.

Replacing a private ferry when it opened in 1891, the structure operated as a toll bridge. It was used until January 1929, when a free bridge of concrete and steel replaced it. The pontoon bridge was subject to the capricious and sometimes turbulent nature of the river and Arkansas weather. Over the years, it was washed away, in parts or completely, many times. It was damaged by persistent high winds, sunk by heavy snow, and threatened by driftwood and, occasionally, floating ice.

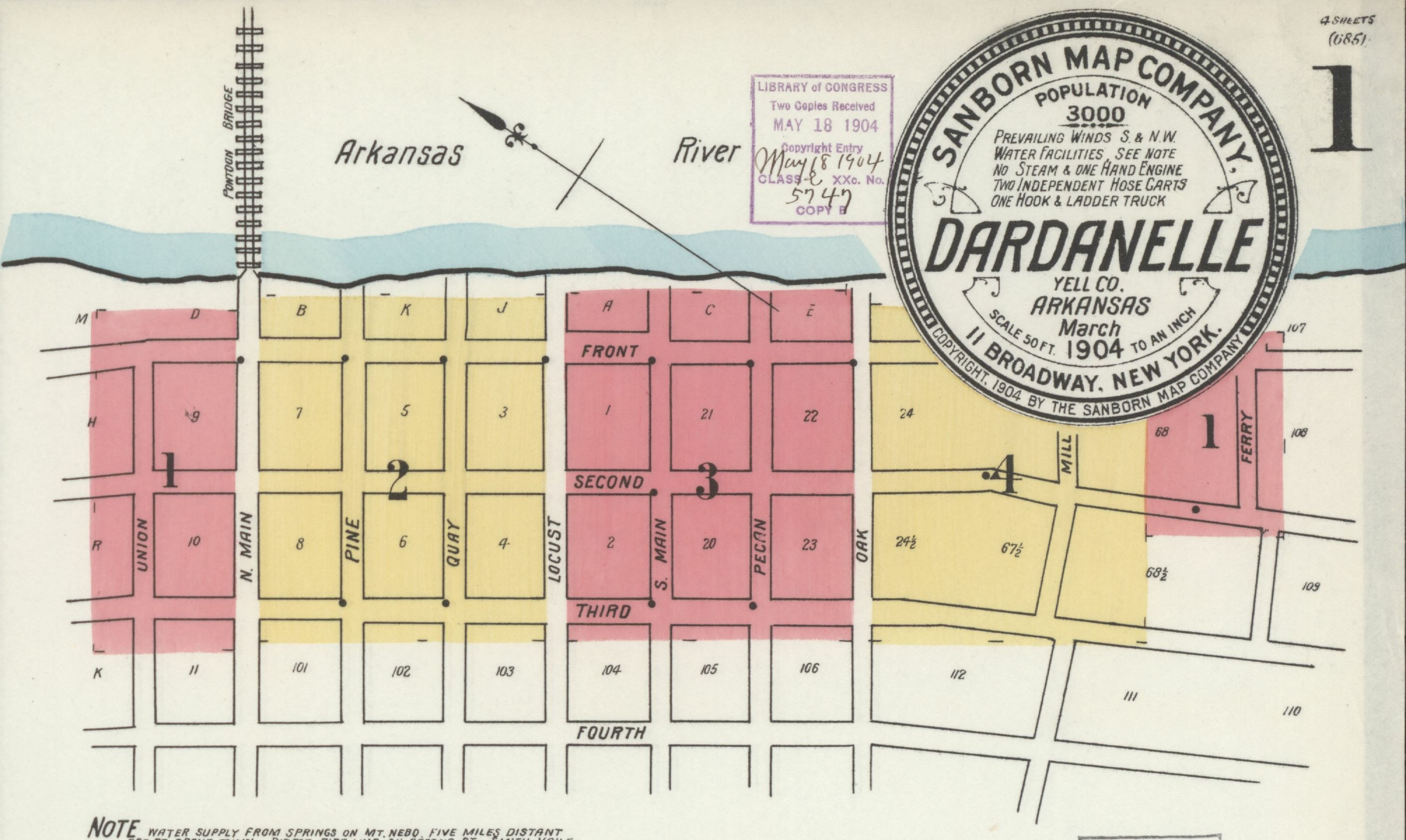
The historic Dardanelle pontoon bridge was reached via Main Street in Dardanelle. Today, the old Main Street is Harrison Street, southeast of Union Street where today's Hwy 7 bridge crosses the Arkansas River. The 1929 bridge that replaced the pontoon bridge was just upstream of the modern bridge. The pontoon bridge crossing was downstream of both.

Held in place with wire cable running to towers running across the river upstream of it, the bridge rose and fell with the river. Near the center, over the main channel of the river—that part of the river that had flowing water when average flows occurred—was the "draw," a moveable section that was swung out, like a gate, to provide passage for steamboats and, at times, heavy masses of driftwood. The entire bridge was flexible and any of the sections could be removed. Removal was frequently a necessity. During high flow and flood periods, the entire structure could be disconnected, swung out, and anchored along the river banks. There were five anchor piers across the river about 100 yards upstream of the bridge and were built in the shape of a pyramid, with a sharp edge turned to the current, and heavily ballasted with rock. The tallest rose nearly 30 feet above the average water level. The bridge was connected to the piers by steel cables, each pier anchoring several bridge sections. A small stern-wheel steamboat was kept in commission to handle the structure and, in conjunction with a barge, serve as a freight and passenger ferry when the bridge was "out."

With the bridge being rebuilt so many times, the general plans remained the same, but what was actually in place varied over the years. In January 1901, according to Dardanelle Mayor and Managing Owner (of the bridge) Thomas Cox,

Part of our bridge was washed away before we understood how to operate it, but it has always paid for putting back and pays a good profit every year. It will pay about twenty-five per cent this year. The bridge is 2,150 feet long, which is the width of river at ten feet stage. There are 80 boats in the bridge.

The bridge is anchored by wire cables to seven anchor towers that are 250 feet apart on a line above the bridge; they are 250 feet above (upstream of) the bridge.

These towers are thirty-eight feet above low water mark at top ring.

Our draw is 250 feet long and works very easily.
(The draw was the section that could be moved to open the bridge for steamboat traffic or to allow driftwood to pass)

== Pontoon Bridge History ==
Much of the available history of the pontoon bridge Is documented in multiple sources. In most instances, only the first source found is used. As much as possible, the bridge's history is presented in chronological order.

=== Construction (1890–1891) ===
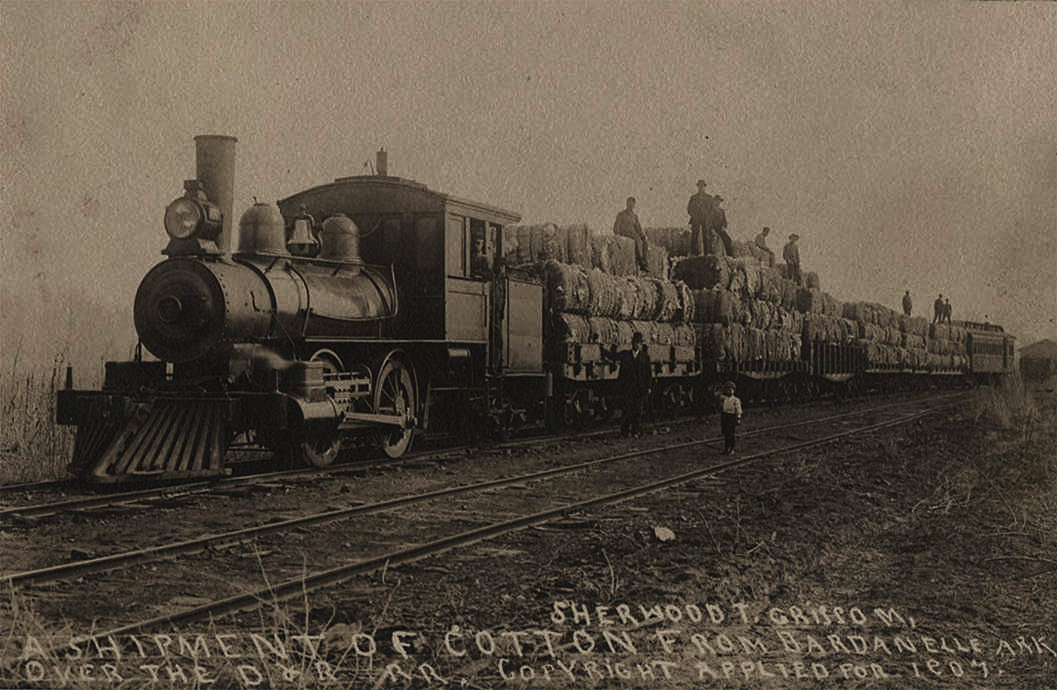
A 1907 shipment of cotton on the Dardanelle and Russellville Railroad, a 4.8-mile (7.7 km) shortline between the pontoon bridge at North Dardanelle and the LR&FS railroad in Russellville, Arkansas. Photographer: Sherwood T. Grissom

News reports in July 1890 said that the Dardanelle and Russellville Railroad (D&R) had decided to have a pontoon bridge built across the river at Dardanelle, to be built by the Kansas City Pontoon Bridge Company, at a projected cost of "about $35,000" —equivalent to about $1,151,500 in early 2023. The company expected to have its bridge completed and in operation within ninety days. Before D&R went into service in 1883, agricultural products—primarily cotton—had been transported by ferry from Dardanelle to North Dardanelle and hauled by wagon to Russellville to be loaded on Little Rock and Fort Smith Railroad (LR&FS) freight cars. In an eight-month period before D&R began operations on its 4.8-mile line, 15,000 bales of cotton had been shipped from Dardanelle. D&R lowered the cost of shipping by eliminating the need to haul heavy loads over an unpaved road that was often impassable because of wear from the heavy freight traffic. The pontoon bridge, when completed, eliminated the need for the ferry which, at times, was an expensive bottleneck for freight traffic.

The construction of pontoon bridges at Dardanelle and Pine Bluff was authorized by the 51st United States Congress in 1890. During the session, Wyoming and Idaho were admitted to the Union, the Oklahoma Territory was established, and the battlefield at Chickamauga was established as a national park.

The Dardanelle Pontoon Bridge and Turnpike Company was incorporated on November 13, 1890, with material already on the ground in anticipation of construction. Their plan was to build and maintain a pontoon bridge across the Arkansas River at Dardanelle as well as construct a turnpike road from the bridge on the north bank of the river across from Dardanelle east to Pott's Station.

By January 1891, the boats of the pontoon bridge were built and placed in position. The bridge opened for traffic on April 1, 1891. Later that month the bridge washed away. Unlike the pontoon bridge at Pine Bluff, which was washed away by the first high water and never rebuilt, the bridge at Dardanelle would be rebuilt, reassembled, and/or repaired after every flood until it was replaced by a steel and concrete structure nearly 4 decades later.

Jacob L. Shinn of Russellville, who owned a steam ferry that operated at the Dardanelle river crossing, was granted an injunction early in the first week of January 1891 restraining the pontoon bridge company from using his land on the north side of the river as an approach to their bridge. After a bill passed in the general assembly authorized the construction of bridges across rivers, the injunction was lifted at the request of the bridge company so that they could finish the bridge. Shinn's compensation would be limited to just a couple of acres. An appeal to the Supreme Court was docketed and dismissed February 27, 1892.

On April 21, 1891, all pontoon boats and most anchoring pilings were swept away during high flows on the Arkansas River. A few days later, the pontoon bridge owners announced that the bridge would be rebuilt and that they "would not be caught napping" when the next big rise in the river came.

In July 1891, the pontoon bridge was opened to keep it from being washed away.

=== 1890s ===
A sixteen-year-old toll collector for the pontoon bridge company fell off the bridge on August 7, 1891, and drowned.

In May 1892, a portion of the bridge, twenty-seven boats were washed away. The boats were recovered and brought back by the steamer John Mathews and made fast to the river banks to await the fall of the river. All but one of the anchoring towers were gone. Once again, the company announced plans to rebuild.

Because of ice flowing down the river, on January 21, 1893, the pontoon bridge was "thrown open"—separating the bridge with sections open to allow the ice to flow freely. By the beginning of February 1893, the pontoon bridge was "in ship shape again."

When flooding threatened in mid-March 1893, the pontoon bridge was taken out to prevent its being washed away.

Arkansas River flooding on May 2, 1893, resulted in bank caving at Norristown, the D&R Railroad lost several feet of track, and the wagon road had fallen in so that no hauling could be done until a new right-of-way was secured. The pontoon bridge was swung open in time to save it, though part did break loose but was captured and cabled to the bank about two miles below Dardanelle. Two of the bridge towers also washed away.

A section of the bridge broke loose with a rise in river level and flows in the first week of October 1893. It floated downriver about 5 miles before it was landed.

The Pontoon Bridge Company of Dardanelle was sued in 1891 by J. L. Shinn of Russellville for damages sustained when the pontoon bridge was put in at Dardanelle. After the venue was changed to Conway County, that court ruled in favor of Shinn for $5,000, less than the full worth of his ferry operation. Both sides appealed to the Supreme Court with Shinn claiming the award was insufficient and the bridge company claiming it was too much, but that case was dismissed. Shinn was subsequently awarded $5,612 for the amount of the court award, interest, and costs. A Sherriff's sale was to be held on March 20, 1893, to raise funds to satisfy the judgment. A motion was filed in October 1893 in the Supreme Court to set aside the judgment awarded to Shinn, but on November 11, the Supreme Court refused to grant the motion.

Fifty boats of the pontoon bridge were carried away by floodwaters in February 1894. The country bridge over Illinois Bayou near Russellville was swept away and two trestles of the railway bridge broke loose. Oita Coal mines, with an area of eighty acres underground, was filled to overflowing.

The pontoon bridge company bought the steamer Mary Morgan in February 1894 for use as a ferry when the bridge was out of service.

A Russellville and Dardanelle(D&R) Railroad conductor, Pat Rice, was crossing the bridge in July 1895, when part of the bridge broke loose and was swept away by high flows. Rice was carried several miles downriver before he could make landfall. In another incident later that month, 12 boats of the bridge broke loose in a rise of the river and floated ten miles downstream. Five men on the boats trying to remove driftwood were carried down as well but were rescued.

With the river very high and rising a few days before Christmas 1895, the pontoon bridge was taken out, but some of the boats broke loose and floated down the river. They were landed before going very far. Below Dadanelle, banks of the river were caving badly and water was encroaching upon farms and farmhouses. One residence had to be moved back away from the water.

In May 1898, the towers supporting the two telephone lines washed away. Two of the pontoon bridge towers were swept away, several boats were damaged and some of the pilings washed out. Further north, LR&FS trains were unable to run due to damaged bridges.

=== 1900s ===
The steamer Elva of Paducah, Kentucky, was purchased in May 1901 by the Dardanelle Pontoon Bridge Company.

The bridge was taken out in early March 1903 to prevent it from being washed away. It was taken out again near the end of May.

A high wind blowing from the southeast on April 8, 1903, forced the pontoon bridge upriver, and several of the boats were sunk.

A "heavy windstorm" shortly after noon on July 1, 1904, severely damaged the bridge. Heavy wire cables by which the bridge is connected to the towers snapped with nearly one-half of the bridge broken loose. Several sections were carried down the river. Damages were estimated at $1500 to $2000—equivalent to $50,400 to $67,000 in 2023 dollars.

High flow washed the bridge away in late July 1904 with replacement work beginning shortly after.

According to an October 9, 1904, article in The Arkansas Democrat, on October 7, high river flows from floods originating in Colorado and the Indian Territory had washed away the pontoon bridge, with all boats being lost. However, an article three days later in The Arkansas Gazette says, "The boat from the pontoon bridge across the Arkansas river... has been replaced and traffic resumed.

The bridge was damaged by ice floating in the river in February 1905. The steamer Alva, which, when connected with a barge used for that purpose, would not be placed into ferry service with the ice flowing downstream.

The bridge company was sued in federal court in 1908 under admiralty law by B. B. Stave Company for the loss of a raft of staves, a loss that the stave company valued at $22,000 in their suit. They alleged that the raft went to pieces on striking the pontoon, being unable to get through.

Two mules owned by Captain Edgar Shinn of the Dardanelle Transfer Company backed off the bridge on February 20, 1908, and were lost.

A man who had lost his team of horses and wagon in the Arkansas River in September 1908, Moses Croom, sued the Dardanelle Pontoon Bridge and Turnpike Company in Yell County Circuit Court, claiming the company was negligent in not keeping a substantial railing on the side of the bridge to prevent the wagon from going overboard. The team had become frightened mid-stream and backed the wagon off the bridge into the river, carrying them with it. Croom was awarded $300 and the company appealed to the Supreme Court in January 1910. On May 30, 1910, the Supreme Court decided in favor of Croom.

The main middle tower of the pontoon bridge went adrift on December 3, 1908, from a large accumulation of floating debris and the force of the flow of water.

A. Bernard, manager of the Dardanelle and Russellville Bridge Company, told Arkansas legislators considering raising tolls on all toll bridges that the pontoon bridge had been a costly expense in recent months. State Senator Martin of Yell county explained that slightly higher tolls were needed so that the bridge company didn't operate at a loss. Since the Rock Island Railroad had been built through southern Yell County, patronage of the bridge had dropped and the company had seriously considered discontinuing operation of the bridge.

=== 1910s ===
The bridge was taken out on June 9, 1912, because of ice flows on the river. All traffic between Russellville and Dardanelle was at a halt as floating ice made the river hazardous for boats.

The Arkansas River rose rapidly at Dardanelle on January 11, 1913, rising 7 feet in 10 hours. The dam of the Russellville Water and Light Company north of Russellville, built to supply the city with water and electric power, gave way following a 36-hour downpour of steady rain. The pontoon bridge had been "taken out," but 26 boats docked on the sandbar were sunk before they could be handled by the bridge crew.

Lightning struck a telephone pole in the middle of the Arkansas River on May 17, 1915, and severely shocked the custodian of the pontoon bridge. As of the end of May, the pontoon bridge had been towed to safety on the banks and crossing was made via steam ferry.

On the night of October 21, 1915, the pontoon bridge was broken by high water and driftwood, the eighth time it had been broken that year.

Phone communication across the river was lost on January 31, 1916, when one of the bridge's anchor piers (towers) was swept away during record flooding, breaking the Southwestern Telegraph and Telephone Company wires.

Residents of Pope and Yell were against a bill in early 1917 to reduce toll fares across the pontoon by nearly fifty percent. They said, "...the cost of maintaining it is heavy, and that it has not paid a dividend in ten years. In addition to being the longest pontoon bridge in the world, it is the only bridge across the river between Little Rock and Van Buren." They claimed that the river was so shallow that it would be impossible to operate a ferry for any considerable part of the year and that, should the bridge cease to operate, Yell County and adjoining counties would be cut off from the railroad in Russellville, at that time the Iron Mountain Railroad.

D&R Railroad placed a sixteen-passenger "motor bus" in service in 1918 to transport passengers over the bridge between the end of their line and Dardanelle.

Because of rising levels and flows in early November 1918, the pontoon bridge was removed.

The bridge was out of service for several days in January 1919 for "extensive repairs."

During flooding and high flows on the river in March 1920, the bridge was out of commission for 10 days.

=== 1920s ===
Another team of mules and a wagon, driven by D. L. McQuire, were lost off the bridge on December 13, 1920. Frightened by a passing automobile, the mules backed the wagon off the upstream side of the bridge. The wagon and mules floated under the bridge. McQuire was moving household goods for a neighbor. He stuck with his wagon until it was in the water and probably would have drowned if he had not been dragged out by workmen on the bridge.

A twenty-six-inch snowfall on February 19, 1921, resulted in the breaking and partial sinking of the pontoon bridge as well as the partial collapse of the roof of one Dardanelle business building and the crushing of a number of hay sheds and other small structures. Thirty pontoon boats were sunk.

The bridge was uncoupled and taken to the river banks on March 31, 1922, when high water, swift current, and driftwood threatened the bridge.

The bridge sections were uncoupled and moored on the banks again during flooding in December 1923. The steam ferry that was normally placed in service when the bridge was out had recently been destroyed by fire. The bridge was out again for two weeks the following May.

=== Replacement ===
Preliminary work for a new, permanent bridge began early in 1926 after construction bonds were approved by voters in Yell and Pope Counties in 1925. While it was being built, the pontoon bridge was damaged by flooding and rebuilt in the summer of 1927, in December 1927, and, again, in the spring of 1928.

The new free $600,000 steel and concrete bridge at Dardanelle, linking Yell and Pope Counties, was dedicated on January 17, 1929. It replaced the toll pontoon bridge. The new bridge was 2,034 feet long, not including the approaches.
