= 1876 Arkansas gubernatorial election =

- September 4, 1876
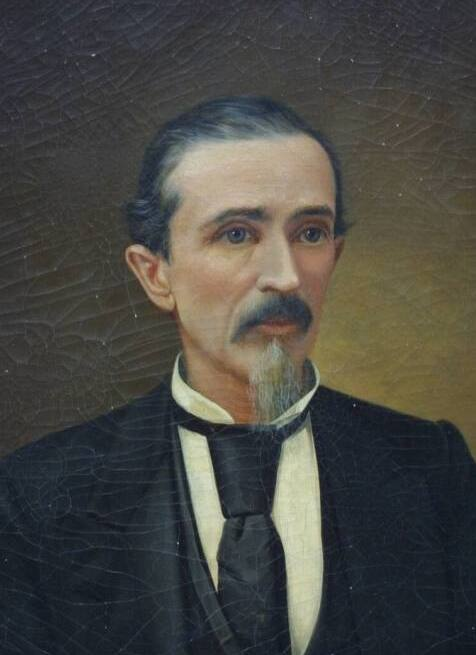

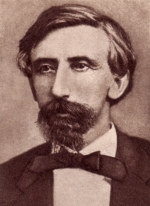
Nominee	William Read Miller	Albert Webb Bishop
Party	Democratic	Republican
Popular vote	69,775	36,272
Percentage	65.62%	34.11%
- County results Miller: 50%-60% 60%-70% 70%-80% 80%-90% 90%-100% Bishop: 50%-60% 60%-70% 70%-80% 80%-90%
Governor before election
Augustus H. Garland
Democratic
Elected Governor
William Read Miller
Democratic

The 1876 Arkansas gubernatorial election was held on September 4, 1876, in order to elect the Governor of Arkansas. Democratic nominee and incumbent Arkansas State Auditor William Read Miller defeated Republican nominee Albert Webb Bishop.

== General election ==
On election day, September 4, 1876, Democratic nominee William Read Miller won the election by a margin of 33,503 votes against his opponent Republican nominee Albert Webb Bishop, thereby retaining Democratic control over the office of Governor. Miller was sworn in as the 12th Governor of Arkansas on January 11, 1877.

=== Results ===
1876 Arkansas gubernatorial election
Party	Candidate	Votes	%
Democratic	William Read Miller	69,775	65.62
Republican	Albert Webb Bishop	36,272	34.11
	Scattering	289	0.27
Total votes		106,336	100.00
Democratic hold			

==== Results by county ====
Results by county
County	William Read Miller		Albert Webb Bishop		Total (Note: Scattering is only reported state-wide, therefore the county totals are the sum of Miller and Bishop, while the statewide total includes all votes.)
Arkansas	921	58.11%	664	41.89%	1,585
Ashley	863	55.93%	680	44.07%	1,543
Baxter	550	90.46%	58	9.54%	608
Benton	2,302	90.45%	243	9.55%	2,545
Boone	1,386	85.40%	237	14.60%	1,623
Bradley	624	78.20%	174	21.80%	798
Calhoun	537	81.86%	119	18.14%	656
Carroll	807	71.73%	318	28.27%	1,125
Chicot	392	19.78%	1,590	80.22%	1,982
Clark	1,301	68.37%	602	31.63%	1,903
Clay	720	97.96%	15	2.04%	735
Columbia	1,268	69.33%	561	30.67%	1,829
Conway	761	59.22%	524	40.78%	1,285
Craighead	851	95.30%	42	4.70%	893
Crawford	1,270	58.85%	888	41.15%	2,158
Crittenden	323	21.66%	1,168	78.34%	1,491
Cross	679	72.93%	252	27.07%	931
Dallas	581	77.88%	165	22.12%	746
Desha	380	30.35%	872	69.65%	1,252
Dorsey (Note: Dorsey County was later renamed to Cleveland.)	783	76.76%	237	23.24%	1,020
Drew	1,208	61.01%	772	38.99%	1,980
Faulkner	1,076	88.78%	136	11.22%	1,212
Franklin	1,485	85.49%	252	14.51%	1,737
Fulton	619	100.00%	0	0.00%	619
Garland	875	64.67%	478	35.33%	1,353
Grant	614	87.84%	85	12.16%	699
Greene	1,019	100.00%	0	0.00%	1,019
Hempstead	1,717	56.39%	1,328	43.61%	3,045
Hot Spring	508	75.60%	164	24.40%	672
Howard	856	70.57%	357	29.43%	1,213
Independence	1,737	79.75%	441	20.25%	2,178
Izard	1,369	98.14%	26	1.86%	1,395
Jackson	1,390	81.52%	315	18.48%	1,705
Jefferson	1,002	21.98%	3,556	78.02%	4,558
Johnson	1,128	83.74%	219	16.26%	1,347
Lafayette	381	39.40%	586	60.60%	967
Lawrence	1,004	100.00%	0	0.00%	1,004
Lee	808	37.39%	1,353	62.61%	2,161
Lincoln	874	46.17%	1,019	53.83%	1,893
Little River	367	45.65%	437	54.35%	804
Logan	1,022	74.65%	347	25.35%	1,369
Lonoke	1,352	66.63%	677	33.37%	2,029
Madison	928	60.73%	600	39.27%	1,528
Marion	708	89.39%	84	10.61%	792
Miller	685	51.58%	643	48.42%	1,328
Mississippi	827	82.70%	173	17.30%	1,000
Monroe	758	50.43%	745	49.57%	1,503
Montgomery	403	85.56%	68	14.44%	471
Nevada	1,085	73.91%	383	26.09%	1,468
Newton	349	46.60%	400	53.40%	749
Ouachita	1,056	51.34%	1,001	48.66%	2,057
Perry	324	71.21%	131	28.79%	455
Phillips	1,010	27.43%	2,672	72.57%	3,682
Pike	411	62.56%	246	37.44%	657
Poinsett	347	99.71%	1	0.29%	348
Polk	586	100.00%	0	0.00%	586
Pope	1,267	87.26%	185	12.74%	1,452
Prairie	840	66.56%	422	33.44%	1,262
Pulaski	2,624	51.81%	2,441	48.19%	5,065
Randolph	1,369	96.75%	46	3.25%	1,415
Saline	926	80.80%	220	19.20%	1,146
Scott	857	98.39%	14	1.61%	871
Searcy	389	55.65%	310	44.35%	699
Sebastian	1,659	69.74%	720	30.26%	2,379
Sevier	559	85.74%	93	14.26%	652
Sharp	1,018	85.47%	173	14.53%	1,191
St. Francis	971	64.82%	527	35.18%	1,498
Stone	604	93.21%	44	6.79%	648
Union	1,201	58.10%	866	41.90%	2,067
Van Buren	1,011	91.58%	93	8.42%	1,104
Washington	2,318	76.43%	715	23.57%	3,033
White	2,084	89.06%	256	10.94%	2,340
Woodruff	922	58.21%	662	41.79%	1,584
Yell	1,306	78.39%	360	21.61%	1,666
Total	69,775	65.62%	36,272	34.11%	106,336
