= Battenfield =

Battenfield is a surname. Notable people with the surname include:

- Joseph H. Battenfield (1848–1909), American newspaper publisher and merchant
- Kent Bottenfield (born 1968), American baseball player
- Peyton Battenfield (born 1997), American baseball player
