= Governor Hadley =

Governor Hadley may refer to:

- Herbert S. Hadley (1872–1927), 32nd Governor of Missouri
- Ozra Amander Hadley (1826–1873), Acting Governor of Arkansas from 1871 to 1873
