= Pope County Militia War =

Period of political and civil troubles

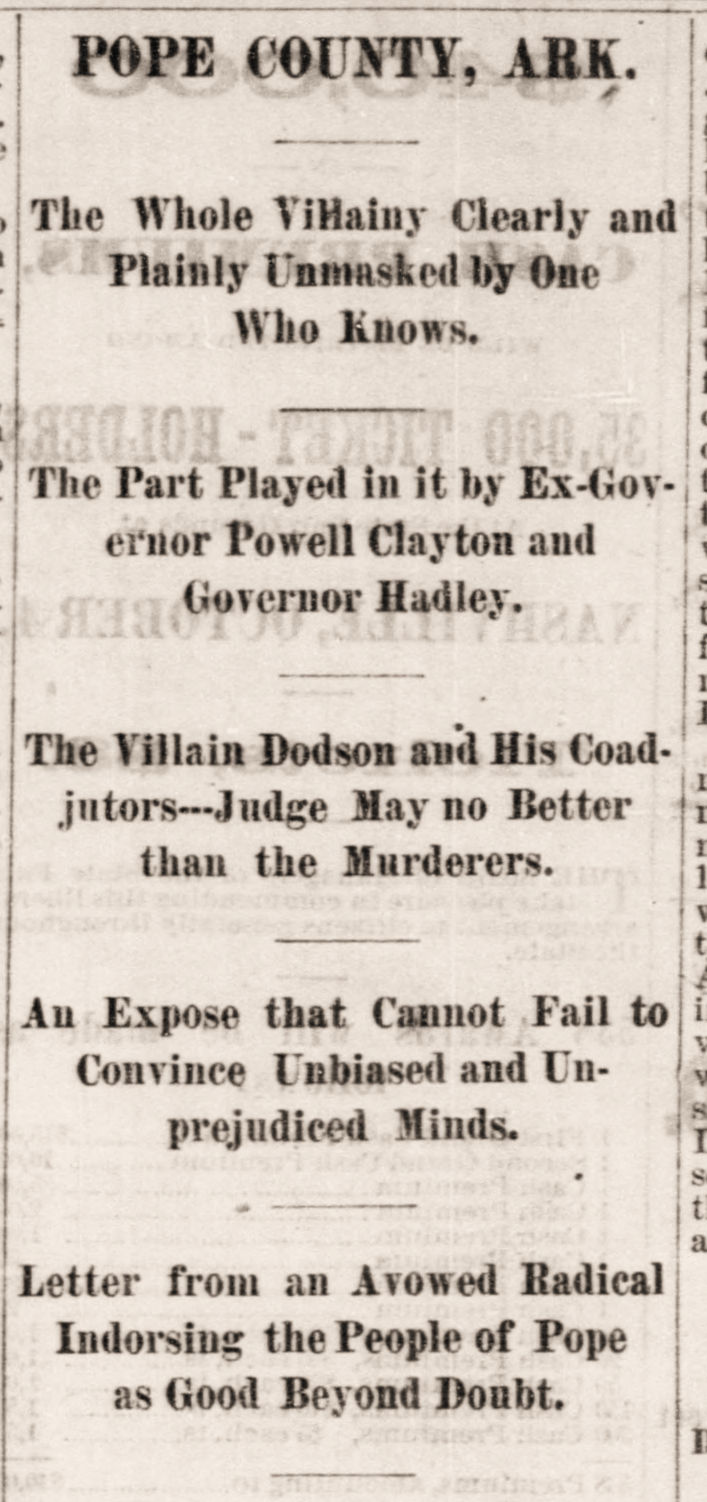
Headlines from the front page of the August 2, 1872, issue of the Daily Appeal in Memphis, Tennessee, three weeks after Sheriff Dodson's posse murdered two prisoners being "escorted" from the county seat in Dover to Circuit Judge May in Dardanelle, Yell County.

In the aftermath of the American Civil War, Pope County, Arkansas experienced a tumultuous seven-month period during the Reconstruction era known as the Pope County Militia War. This period was marked by political and civil unrest, as four county officials, aided by an unofficial militia, purportedly manipulated county affairs to advance their own agenda. These officials persistently urged the Arkansas governor to impose martial law in the county, with the aim of exerting greater control over voter registration and the November 1872 election.

By the end of this "militia war", three of the four county officials had been killed—and martial law had not been declared.

The fourth official, the county's superintendent of schools, left the state.

Local, state, and national newspapers covered this troubling period in Pope County extensively, including front-page spreads in the New York Herald, Chicago Tribune, and Memphis Daily Appeal.

On October 10, 1872, a Special Commission appointed by the Arkansas Governor reported, "We are satisfied that much of the bad feeling existing in Pope county has been engendered and fostered by unscrupulous politicians."

== Reconstruction ==
During the military reconstruction period (1867-1868), companies E and G of the Nineteenth Infantry, were stationed in Pope County and headquartered at Dover for a year and a half. Arkansas became the second former Confederate state to be fully restored to the Union in June 1868. However, political and social stability was still years away.

In 1868, a militia law passed by the general assembly authorized the governor to enroll a state guard modeled, generally, after the U. S. Army. Elements of this guard would be used four years later in Pope County, during the period that became known as the Militia War.

=== Troubles ===
Between 1865 and 1872, at least five officials in the county were assassinated: Sheriff Archibald D. Napier and Deputy Sheriff Albert Parks on October 24, 1865, County Clerk William Stout on December 4, 1865, Sheriff W. Morris Williams on August 20, 1866, and Russellville Postmaster John L. Harkey on July 27, 1868.

Other violence also occurred during that period.

On March 1, 1870, the new Pope County jail in Dover was burned. A man named Glover later claimed responsibility.

A fire on February 6, 1872, destroyed a store belonging to Joseph H. Battenfield. Losses included a large stock of general hardware, wood and willowware, and tinner's tools and stock. The loss was estimated at $7,800, with $5,000 covered by insurance. Battenfield ascribed the fire as reprisal for his publishing facts about the plundering of the county by county officials, Sheriff Elisha W. Dodson, Deputy Sheriff John H. Williams, School Superintendent W. A. Stuart, and County Clerk Wallace H. Hickox.

==== Militia War ====
A period of a little over seven months in 1872 and 1873 came to be known as the Pope County Militia War. However, there were no battles or skirmishes. There were no engagements between organized opponents of any kind. Instead, an irregular armed group sometimes referred to as a militia, and headed by four county officers, exerted excessive and harsh control over the county, including threats to burn Dover, the county seat. By the end of the period, three of the four officials were dead.

In 1872, an Independence Day celebration in Pope County, held at a camp meeting ground at Center Valley, was attended by prominent ministers and county officials, most of whom were aligned with and appointed by the Radical Republican state administration. Many "patriotic" addresses were given "in which much was said in condemnation of 'rebels' in general and those of the county in particular." A day or so after the celebration, news spread over the country that the sheriff's chief deputy, John Harold Williams, after leaving the celebration, "had been seriously, if not fatally, wounded from the brush at his home near Scottsville." Concerned neighbors were told by a physician that there were two holes in Williams' jacket, "one in the left sleeve, corresponding with an abrasion on his arm, the other is in front opposite a dent in his belt buckle and a bruise on his abdomen." There was also a hole in the crown of his hat. After being mortally wounded just two months later, Williams admitted his alleged shooting in July was a ruse, part of a plot "arranged in Little Rock and perfected at the celebration on the 4th of July," a plot whose purpose was to maintain county officials' control of the county through the 1872 election.

===== Incident at Shiloh Creek =====
On July 8, 1872, four men, William Hale (age 32), Nicholas J. (Jack) Hale (age 59), Joe Tucker (age 32), and Isham Liberty "Lib" West (age 34), were arrested and held for a short time at the courthouse in Dover. That afternoon, the prisoners, under the guard of a sheriff's posse of about twenty-four men that included Sheriff Elisha W. Dodson, Deputy Sheriff John H. Williams, School Superintendent W. A. Stuart, and County Clerk Wallace H. Hickox, were moved for the purported purpose of taking them to Dardanelle "for examination" where Sixth Judicial Circuit Court Judge William N. May resided. Upon reaching the old camping ground at Shiloh, the posse stopped, supposedly for the purposes of gathering forage for the horses and spending the night before proceeding to Dardanelle. After a period of time, the posse remounted with the prisoners at the front and proceeded toward Russellville. Soon after, one of the posse remarked—"It is as dark as Egypt," and another replied "Egypt has no eyes," immediately followed by shots from unseen parties and the guard opened fire on the prisoners. William Hale and Joe Tucker were hit. When Lib West leaned hard to one side, his saddle shifted and he fell to the ground, scrambling to hide in the brush along the road. N. J. Hale "ran his horse forward" and made an escape. During the melee, Wallace Hickox was thrown from his horse, suffering a severe injury to his arm. On the ground, Tucker was shot a second time by Dodson with a shotgun. The wounds of Tucker and Hale indicated they had been shot at close range and could not have been from shots fired from the roadside.

Subsequently, Dodson, Williams, Stuart, and Hickox traveled to Little Rock seeking a declaration of martial law from Governor O. A. Hadley under the claim that they had been bushwhacked on the way to Dardanelle. It was widely believed in Pope County that the affair that resulted in the killing of Tucker and Hale and the attempted murder of West and the elder Hale was part of a plot concocted at Little Rock to place the counties with strong anti-Clayton factions under martial law to control voter registration and the upcoming election and that the escape of two intended victims and the sworn statements of Jack Hale, Liberty West, and the mortally wounded William Hale likely prevented the plot from being carried out.

A correspondent for the New York Tribune wrote from Russellville on August 10, 1872:

The gist of the Pope County affair is this: A sheriff and a clerk finding their terms of office about to expire, and nine-tenths of the people determined to put honest men in their places, connive to have martial law declared so that there will be no election, and they could hold over. They take a Deputy-Sheriff and a School Superintendent into the plot. The Deputy fires at his hat and coat one evening and says he has been bushwhacked. The Sheriff, Clerk, and School Superintendent raise a posse. They try to arrest some men against whom they have personal grudges, but not finding them at home, they take others whom they can conveniently lay hands on. They kill two of the prisoners, and immediately start for the State Capitol, saying that they have been bushwhacked, and that the prisoners were shot by their own friends. They raise a hue and cry that the county is in insurrection, and declare that nothing but martial law will put down the insurgents. I cannot believe that this stupid, barbarous piece of business was planned by anyone beside the ruffians who carried it out. Nevertheless the people of Pope County, with almost unanimity, are convinced that the plot was formed at Little Rock by the Ring that controls the State Government. They think a scheme was laid to try the effect of martial law on one county, and in the event of its success to put in force in several of the strong Democratic counties...

After N. J. Hale made it back to Dover before midnight, he roused people in Dover to tell of the prisoners' misfortunes and his escape. By dawn (5:14 A.M.) on July 9, the courthouse square was "a wild spectacle" of armed and angry men and upset citizens. An armed body of about 40 "skirmishers," some mounted, some on foot, had already departed toward Shiloh camping ground and the scene of the shooting with a larger armed party remaining in Dover. The scouting party found the body of Joe Tucker, trampled by horses, next to the road. Young William Hale was found in a home less than half a mile away, mortally wounded and fearful, believing that Dodson meant to hunt him down and finish "the killing of him."

Citizens organized into a protection organization they called a "police force."

The week after the incident at Shiloh Creek, Governor Hadley traveled to Russellville, staying overnight and meeting the next day with leading citizens of the Dover area. He was told that they could not disband their "Dover Guards" until Williams's militia was dispersed. On his way back to Little Rock on July 13, he issued Special Order No. 1 at Perry Station, relieving from the "First Company of Pope County State Guards" and requiring them to return to their homes "as quiet and good citizens."

On July 30, Hadley issued a lengthy proclamation to the citizens of Pope County, stating, "I do not desire to place Pope county under martial law, or subject its citizens to the loss of property consequent upon quartering militia in the county, but the law must and shall be enforced, respected and obeyed, and, if necessary, the entire forces of the state will be employed for that purpose. Citizens must return to their homes, lay down their arms and attend to the daily avocations of life... Two sheriffs of Pope county and one clerk have already been assassinated and murdered, and no attempt has been made, so far as I am advised, to bring the murderers to justice."

====== Arrests ======
On the evidence of affidavits by N. J. Hale, William Hale, and I. L. West, arrest warrants were issued for the Sheriff and his posse by Sixth Judicial Circuit Court Judge William N. May. Appearing before Judge May on July 22, they were placed under the guard of friends. After they were arraigned and waived examination on the 23rd, Dodson, Hickox, and Williams were released on a $5,000 bond each. W. A. Stuart and 21 others were required to each give a bond of $500 to answer at the next circuit court to the charge of first-degree murder. No trials were ever held on the case.

Arrest warrants were also issued, on the affidavit of Sheriff Dodson, for ten men living in and near Dover and charged with an alleged attempt to assassinate Deputy Sheriff Williams. Judge May permitted the men to select their own guard to surrender to. The accused men appeared before the court on July 25, 1872, with ten guards, twenty-three witnesses, and some citizens, all armed with shotguns, pistols, or both. All were disarmed except the guards. After the day was spent on another case, they were told to return the next day, but the judge failed to appear. Two prominent merchants from Russellville, Jacob L. Shinn and a Mr. Howell, traveled the six miles to Dardanelle to visit Judge May and determine why he had not made it to court. May said he was sick and unable to attend court and that, in fact, there was no evidence against the young men. Judge May sent word with Shinn and Howell that the men were "honorably acquitted." In a July 30 letter to the governor, Judge May wrote, "The prosecution had not, up to that time, had a subpœna issued and intimidated that they did not intend to subpœna any. I instructed the sheriff to discharge the prisoners for failure of the plaintiffs to produce any witnesses to sustain their charges. The same was done, and so the investigation ended."

In his July 30 letter, Judge May also wrote, "Governor, whatever you do, I would urge you not to declare martial law in Pope county, unless there should be more justification for it than now."

===== Envoys and commissions =====
In August, Governor Hadley sent General Albert W. Bishop to Pope County "as a commissioner of peace and to discover the actual state of feeling" and report to the governor. In a report to Hadley, Bishop said there was "insufficient" cause for a declaration of martial law. He also reported that the people generally believed that peace should be maintained and that County Clerk Hickox and Sheriff Dodson should resign.

A group of men—W. I. Warwick, E. H. English, Sol. F. Clark and James S. Wolfe—commissioned by Governor Hadley to ascertain what steps could be taken to disband the militia and "more speedily restore peace and confidence" determined that the Pope County issues had been "engendered and fostered by unscrupulous politicians."

===== Unsafe to do Business =====
Dodson and Hickox next tried, in August, to get martial law declared under the premise that it was unsafe to do county business at the courthouse in Dover. Ordered to close the county clerk's office by Hickox, Deputy Clerk (Rev.) J. M. P. Hickerson instead kept it open.

Many merchants of Dover and Russellville moved their goods out of the county.

===== Death of County Clerk Hickox =====
On August 31, 1872, shortly after loading the county records into a wagon and sending them off toward Russellville, Sheriff Dodson, County Clerk Hickox, and former deputy Williams left the courthouse in Dover riding south. A short distance later, Williams reined his horse to the right onto the sidewalk, riding toward the woodshop of William H. H. Poynter (Poynter), with Dodson and Hickox following. As he got in front of the shop, Williams threw out his hand, firing two pistol shots toward the shop, and another shot was fired from one of the other two riders. In response, Poynter fired twice with a shotgun from the shop. Hickox fell from his horse, dead. Dodson and Williams galloped off, shooting back toward the town. Men who had pistols ran from where they had been sitting in front of town stores, firing twenty-five to thirty shots. Williams' horse was hit in a foreleg. Williams was last seen on the road to Russellville with his horse trotting on three legs.

Later that day, Justice of the Peace Allen Brown was accidentally shot shortly after a jury of inquest on the death of Hickox had concluded. Mortally wounded, Brown claimed that he had been shot by a brother of the late William Hale but recanted after he was told by his daughter that Hale had been with her at supper at the time of the shooting. Before dying, he made a statement that he believed the shooting was purely accidental.

Following the death of Hickox, Jacob L. Shinn, one of the leading citizens of Russellville and the county, traveled with an eyewitness to the killing, Rev. J. M. P. Hickerson, to Little Rock, where Shinn met with Governor Hadley on September 4 and arranged a meeting between Hadley and Hickerson. Reports said that Frank Hickox, a brother of the slain clerk, and another man waylaid the stage between Russellville and Perry Station, at that time the furthest west terminus of the Little Rock & Fort Smith Railroad, thinking to find Hickerson, remove him from the stage, and prevent him from seeing the Governor. However, Shinn and Hickerson bypassed Perry Station and rode on horseback to Lewisburg, where they took the train. On the evening of the 4th, Hickerson was accosted on Markham Street in Little Rock by Hickox, Pope County Sheriff Dodson, and Deputy Sheriff Williams—who apparently were trying to intimidate Hickerson and keep him from talking to Hadley—but he was able to find refuge in a shop and obtain aid from a policeman.

===== State Guards and enrolled militia Under General Upham =====
After a request for help from Sheriff Dodson that misrepresented what had transpired on August 31 in Dover, Governor Hadley issued orders on September 4 to Major General D. P. Upham to provide aid in Pope County "as is or may be necessary to execute the civil and criminal law of the state." The orders gave Upham discretionary power to use force and to call state guards and enrolled militia into service. On September 6, General Upham, with a contingent of eleven members of the state guards commanded by Lt. Groves, traveled to Pope County, where Sheriff Dodson met them at their arrival at Perry Station with three companies of his militia.

Joseph H. Battenfield's Russellville Tribune newspaper office was burned on September 8. The paper was conservative and its editor dared publish material uncomplimentary to Sheriff Dodson and the officials behind him. Replacement printing equipment was obtained, with the weekly newspaper resuming publication with only a few issues having been missed.

On September 9, a posse, who had a "writ" for his arrest, attempted to take John H. Williams into custody for attempting to kill Harry Poynter on August 31. Williams refused to be arrested and, outgunned, was shot and captured. Mortally wounded, Williams made a confession that he had "begun the trouble".

During this period, many Pope County families who were able to sought refuge elsewhere. This included one of the wealthiest, Jacob L. Shinn, who had taken refuge in Little Rock. Sheriff Dodson's "militia" terrorized much of the southern part of the county, preying on and plundering the property of Pope County citizens such as Kirkbride Potts, John Bradley, and J. B. Wharton. Merchants in Russellville were forced to provide supplies for Dodson's men, camped two miles from town, with payment only in orders on the county. A small force of state guards under General Upham stood between Dodson's militia and the "crowd" in Dover."

===== Campaign and Election Fraud =====
On May 11, 1872, School Superintendent W. A. Stuart and County Clerk Wallace H. Hickox were two of the three delegates elected at the Pope County Republican convention to the state republican convention. The third delegate was Yancey B. Shapard, chairman of the Pope County Republican Central Committee, who called the convention to order and was elected its president. In December 1869, Congress had removed the legal and political disabilities imposed on Shapard under the Fourteenth Amendment because of his participation in the rebellion.

Election campaigns in 1872 found many Arkansas Democrats supporting Joseph Brooks, the Liberal Republican (Brindletail) gubernatorial nominee against Republican Elisha Baxter. Both sides reported statewide fraud and voting irregularities. State election officials threw out the votes of four counties, and Baxter was declared the victor. Pope County was one of twenty-nine counties where the vote was contested. Numerous citizens gave testimony and depositions about fraud and irregularities witnessed during voter registration and the election in Pope County perpetrated by Sheriff Elijah W. Dodson, County Clerk Wallace H. Hickox, Captain George W. Herriot, an election judge, John H. Martin, the president of the board of registration, Superintendent of Public Schools W. A. Stuart and others. Registration and voting were only done at two of the twelve Pope County townships with the "classes disenfranchised" provision of the 1868 Arkansas Constitution liberally applied. During the November 5, 1872 election, members of Dodson's militia—having given up their "guns, but... retained their pistols"—were "around the polls" in Dover and Russellville all day. Following the election most of the state guards called into service in September returned home.

In October, Sheriff Dodson resigned and the militia was disbanded, However, he was on the ballot for the November 5, 1872 election, where he claimed victory over his opponent, Absalom S. Fowler—late of the state guard and the sheriff appointed in Dodson's place after his resignation—and was commissioned by the governor.

===== Deaths of Captain Herriott and Sheriff Dodson =====
The contested election case for Pope County Sheriff between Elisha Dodson and A. S. Fowler was heard at the county courthouse in Dover on February 19, 1873, by Judge Brown, who determined he didn't have jurisdiction to decide the case.

Following the hearing, during a physical altercation between Captain George Herriott and John Hale, initiated by Hale, Herriot was shot and killed by an unidentified third party. Herriott, who had been in Pope County with the state guards during voter registration and the general election, was at the hearing as a witness.

Dodson and Fowler, along with others, had departed for Perry Station where they were to catch a train for Little Rock early on the morning of February 20. As Dodson boarded the train, he was mortally wounded by someone shooting from below the platform.

The killings of Herriott and Dodson and the state of affairs in Pope County were the subject of discussion and resolutions in both houses of the General Assembly on February 20, 1873, after it was learned that Dodson had been shot that morning.

=== Related Information ===
==== Martial Law ====
While Governor Hadley threatened to institute martial law and despite attempts from Sheriff Dodson and County Clerk Hickox to get the county placed under martial law, it was never declared. Major General Upham was given the authority to call state guards and enrolled militia into service to aid the local civil authorities in executing state laws, but that authority fell far short of a declaration of martial law.

==== Assassinations and Murders (and attempts) ====
In the period between the end of the war and the end of Reconstruction, a number of assassinations and murders of public officials and others occurred in Pope County.

- October 25, 1865—Sheriff Archibald Dodson Napier, the county's first sheriff following the war, and Deputy Sheriff Albert M. Parks were killed on a road east of Dover. Some sources claim that George W. Newton was the assassin.
- December 4, 1865—County Clerk William Stout, a Methodist minister, was murdered in his home at his desk. George W. Newton is said by some sources to have been Stout's assassin.
- August 20, 1866—Sheriff William Morris Williams—Napier's successor—was murdered at his home in Dover and Gaine Ray was killed at his Gum Log residence.
- July 27, 1868—Russellville Postmaster John L. Harkey was murdered at his store.
- July 4, 1872—alleged attempted assassination of Deputy Sheriff John Harold Williams, younger brother of William Morris Williams.
- July 8, 1872—Josiah Marion Tucker was killed and William Hale was mortally wounded near Shiloh Creek by a posse supposedly escorting them and two others to a judge in Dardanelle. Both men were 32-year-old farmers.
- August 31, 1872—County Clerk Wallace H. Hickox was killed in Dover. Late that afternoon, Justice of the Peace Allen Brown was accidentally shot as citizens prepared to defend against a feared raid.
- September 9, 1872—Allen Drake was killed by a man named Glover, a "noted desperado" who had killed others. In a dispute in 1866, Drake had shot and wounded Glover. Glover, who boasted he had burned several jails since he had burned the one in Dover, was subsequently killed either by friends of Drake or by sheriff's deputies taking him back to Johnson County after Pope County citizens turned him over to them. Glover was alleged to have assassinated Sheriff W. Morris Williams.
- September 9, 1872—Former Deputy Sheriff John H. Williams was mortally wounded, dying the next day.
- February 19, 1873—During an altercation, Captain George Rutherford Herriott of the state guards was fatally shot at the county courthouse by some unknown person.
- February 20, 1873—Sheriff Elisha W. Dodson was mortally wounded as he boarded a train at Perry Station, then the western terminus of the Little Rock and Fort Smith Railroad.

==== Biographical information of Individuals Involved in Pope County Reconstruction Troubles ====
- Elisha W. Dodson (May 21, 1828, to February 20, 1873)—Captain, Third Arkansas Cavalry Regiment (Union), Company A, Date of rank, November 29, 1863; appointed from private to 1st lieutenant October 18, 1863; dismissed Feb. 13, 1864. Alleged guerilla After Sheriff Williams was murdered, three men served as sheriff before Dodson was appointed to the position in 1871. Sheriff, Pope County.
- Reverend Joseph M. P. Hickerson (June 22, 1826 to May 5, 1898)—Preacher, President of the North Arkansas Conference of the Methodist Protestant Church, Assistant County Clerk up to August 30, 1871, when he was fired by Hickox. Postmaster at Wallaceburg, Arkansas in 1875.
- Wallace H. Hickox (August 31, 1840, to August 31, 1872)—2d lieutenant, Fourth Regiment Arkansas cavalry volunteers, Company B, Appointed from quartermaster sergeant of 15th Illinois cavalry, date of rank April 11, 1864, mustered out at Little Rock, Arkansas, October 5, 1864. Lieutenant, Third Arkansas Cavalry Regiment (Union), Company I, date of rank, February 1, 1865; mustered out with regiment June 30, 1865. County Clerk, Pope County
- William N. May (January 4, 1827, to January 18, 1901)
  - presided over hearings in July 1872 that charged Dodson, Hickox and their posse with first degree murder and exonerated the citizens that Dodson accused of ambushing the posse.
  - Sixth Judicial Circuit Judge, appointed by Governor Powell Clayton, serving from 1868 to 1874. Yell County mercantile clerk for three years, merchant for eight, a lawyer admitted to the bar in 1857 and a legislator in 1868. During the civil war, he moved his family to Chicago for 18 months. Owned large home and 7,000 acres of land.
- Archibald D. Napier (1822 to October 24, 1865)—Local to Pope County in May 1861. Captain, Third Arkansas Cavalry Regiment (Union), Company I, enlistment November 21, 1863, date of rank (Captain) February 14, 1864, 1st lieutenant from organization; dismissed October 15, 1854. Commissioned as a Captain of militia organized for Pope County, date of commission April 8, 1865. Said to have been a jayhawker. Sheriff, Pope County.
- George Washington Newton—a former confederate soldier, identified by some sources as the assassin of Sheriff Napier, Deputy Parks, and County Clerk Stout. Newton is said to have served in Capt. Thomas Linton's company, Scott's squadron, and Jackson's regiment, Shelby's division of Arkansas, where he was promoted to the rank of Major. However, in a 1930 widow's pension application in Texas, Nancy Newton records, "First was a member of Co. B 1st battalion Arkansas and then a member Co. G. Nichols Regiment Mo. Cavalry." No mention was made in the application of any officer rank and Nancy Newton was awarded a widow's pension for his service as Sergeant G. W. Newton.
- Albert M. Parks (1823 to October 25, 1865)—Deputy sheriff, Pope County. A widower, he had remarried just 15 days before he was killed.
- William Henry Harrison "Harry" Poynter IV (September 8, 1847, to April 13, 1931)—Served as a private in Company A, 7th Regiment, Arkansas Cavalry (Confederate); farmer, carpenter, a saloon keeper in 1880, a farmer in 1900, a laborer in 1910.
- John Harold Williams (1849 to September 10, 1872)—Bugler, Third Arkansas Cavalry Regiment (Union), Company I, enlistment and date of rank, December 29, 1864; mustered out with regiment June 30, 1865, school teacher, deputy sheriff
- William Morris Williams (1840 to August 20, 1866)—Lieutenant Confederate army, Captain, Third Arkansas Cavalry Regiment (Union), Company I, enlistment November 21, 1863, date of rank (Captain) February 1, 1865, Appointed from Private to 2d lieutenant; mustered out with regiment June 30, 1865. Sheriff, Pope County.
- William Addison Stuart (October 23, 1835, to May 9, 1900)
  - Sergeant, Company B, 3rd Regiment, Iowa Infantry; Captain, 60th Infantry Regiment US Colored Troops;
  - From July to December 1865 he was Superintendent and Agent in the Arkadelphia Freedmen’s Bureau Arkansas Field Office.
  - While he was actually Pope County's "Superintendent of Public Instruction," his occupation in the 1870 census was listed as "teaching school" in Illinois Township, Pope County, Arkansas, that he was born in Illinois, wife in Indiana, daughter age 5 in Iowa and daughter 10 months in Arkansas, and that he had $200 in real estate and $900 personal wealth.
  - Stuart, no longer in office and the only surviving official out of the four who had been involved in much of the Pope County troubles, wrote a letter regarding correspondence from J. K. Periman on March 15, 1873, to the Daily Arkansas Gazette in which he said, "Democratic citizens... informed several of us that our lives were in great peril, and would be stolen from us if found." In a lengthy response, Periman wrote about Stuart, "He seems to forget that there is an indictment against him for murder found by that grand jury he says is on the 'black list'—though what that is, I don't know. He seems to forget that he ever took advantage of his position as circuit superintendent to speculate in school orders."
  - By 1874, Stuart was in Kokomo, Indiana, residing there until at least 1880, when the census recorded him working as a real estate agent.
  - In a June 1895 Grand Army of the Republic post report in Russell Springs, Kansas—where he had lived since at least October 1887—, his rank of Captain is provided but his service with the U. S. Colored Infantry is omitted. An 1895 Kansas census has his occupation as "agent." The next year, he remarried, his first wife having died in 1893, in Los Angeles, with his residence recorded as LA. Four years later, in May 1890 at the age of 64, he died in the rather remote town of Harpster, Idaho, having outlived his coconspirators by more than 17 years.
- William Stout (1806 to December 4, 1865)—Enlisted January 15, 1829, in Knoxville, Tennessee; moved to Dover by 1843; Captain David West's Unit, Lt. Colonel W. Gray's Arkansas Volunteers, 1846 to April 30, 1847 (War with Mexico), county clerk before the civil war, Pope County delegate to the 1861 State Convention and the 1864 Constitutional Convention, signer of the Arkansas Ordinance of Secession served in the home guard during the war, civilian scout and guide for Union troops and the first county clerk after the war. His son, Delano B Stout, died in the Point Lookout Confederate prison 8 months after being captured.
