= Albert Webb Bishop =

American academic administrator

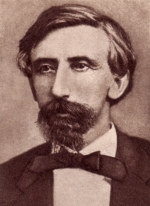

Personal details
- Born: January 8, 1832 Alden, New York, U.S.
- Died: November 29, 1901 (aged 69) Buffalo, New York, U.S.
- Party: Republican
- Education: Yale University (BA) 1853

Military service
- Allegiance: United States
- Branch/service: United States Army
- Years of service: 1861–1865
- Battles/wars: American Civil War

Albert Webb Bishop (January 8, 1832 – November 29, 1901) was a lawyer who served in the Union Army during the American Civil War, worked as a public official, wrote about loyalists to the Union in Arkansas, and was a college president.

He was born in Alden, New York to Calvin and Emily Bishop. He graduated from Yale with a B.A. in 1853. He later served in the Union Army, serving as captain of the 2nd Wisconsin Cavalry Regiment, and was adjutant-general of Arkansas in 1864 and 1865. He then served as federal register in bankruptcy for Arkansas' second district from 1867 until 1873. When Arkansas Industrial University was founded in 1871 he served as a trustee and treasurer. He then served as the university's second president from 1873 until 1875. The university went on to become the University of Arkansas.

He was married to Maria L. Woodard until her death in 1860. Their daughter Maria was raised by family in Cortland, New York. He wrote Loyalty on the Frontier in 1862 and 1863. He married Kate Compton of Little Rock in 1871.

As Adjutant General, Bishop submitted the manuscript, Report of the Adjutant General of the State of Arkansas..., as a document accompanying the governor's message to the legislature of the State of Arkansas, which disregarded the governor's recommendation that it be printed by their order. The report, a compilation of the rosters and service of the units and men from Arkansas who served on the Union side, was subsequently ordered published by the United States Senate in 1867.

In August 1872, during what became known as the Pope County Militia War Governor O. A. Hadley sent General Bishop to Pope County "as a commissioner of peace and to discover the actual state of feeling." Bishop, in a report to Hadley, said that there was "insufficient" cause for a declaration of martial law and that the people generally believed that peace should be maintained.

He ran for governor of Arkansas as a Republican in 1875. With the resurgence of Democratic Party control and redeemers, he saw a decline in his income and station. He and his wife divorced. He eventually returned to New York and died in Buffalo.

The University of Arkansas has some of his letters in its library collection. He gave a speech about loyalists in northwestern Arkansas that was published.

He wrote a request for supplies to U.S. President Abraham Lincoln.

== Baseball ==
Bishop was a member of the 1859 Niagaras of Buffalo baseball team.

== Bibliography ==
- Loyalty on the Frontier: or Sketches of Union Men of the South-West (1863) republished in 2003 with editor introduction and notes in 2003
