= Dardanelle and Russellville Railroad =

Short-line railroad

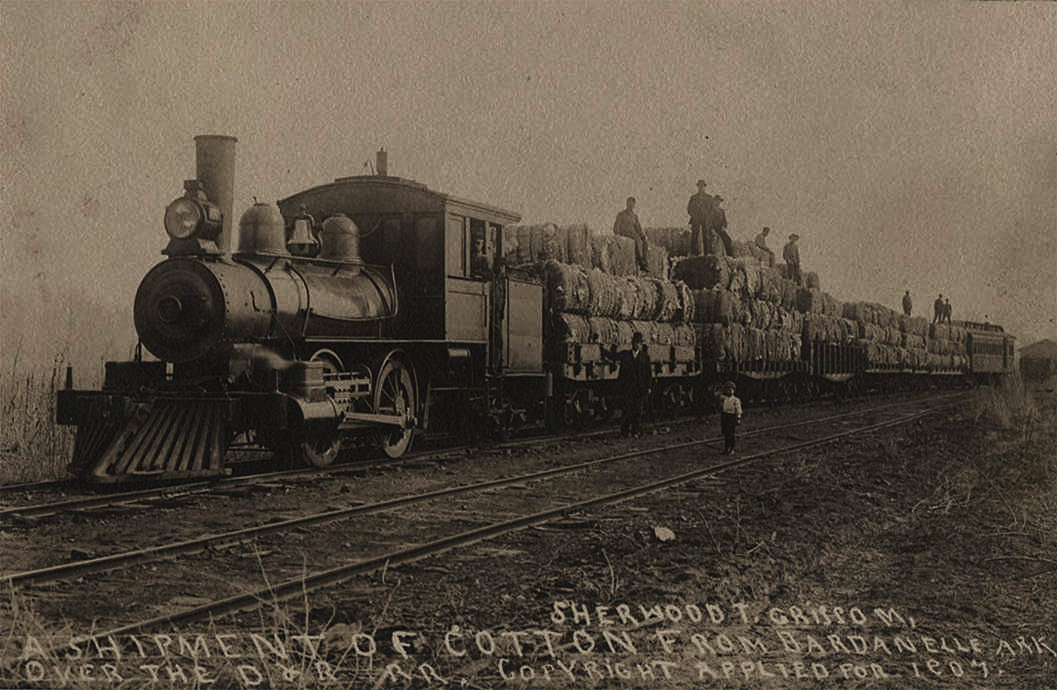
- A shipment of cotton on the Dardanelle and Russellville Railroad in 1907. Photographer: Sherwood T. Grissom.

Overview
- Headquarters: Russellville, Arkansas
- Reporting mark: DR
- Locale: Arkansas
- Dates of operation: 1883–

Technical
- Track gauge: 4 ft 8 1/2 in (1,435 mm)
- Length: 4.8 miles (7.7 km)

The Dardanelle and Russellville Railroad Company (D&R) (reporting mark DR) is a Class III short-line railroad headquartered in Russellville, Arkansas.

D&R operates a 4.8-mile (7.7 km) line in Arkansas from Russellville (where it interchanges with Union Pacific) to North Dardanelle, across the Arkansas River from Dardanelle, Arkansas. Current D&R traffic generally consists of pulp board, plastics, and forest products. D&R is currently owned by Arkansas Shortline Railroads, Inc., a short-line railroad holding company.

== History ==
The creation of the D&R railroad was motivated by the desire to develop Dardanelle and for better transportation of agricultural products—primarily cotton—from Dardanelle to the Little Rock and Fort Smith (LR&FS) Railway in Russellville. In an eight-month period in the early 1880s, 15,000 bales of cotton were shipped from Dardanelle. They were ferried across the river to North Dardanelle, hauled by wagon to Russellville, and then loaded on LR&FS freight cars. The road from North Dardanelle to Russellville was poor and frequently nearly impossible to travel. With the heavy wagon traffic over it, the road was cut into almost impassible gullies, freight teams suffered, it was destructive to wagons, fatiguing for teamsters, and expenses were high. On September 30, 1882, a meeting was held at the Yell County Courthouse to develop plans to connect the town to the Russellville depot. A three-man committee was established to raise financial support and to secure cooperation with the LR&FS Railway.

The line was initially chartered as the Dardanelle & Russellville Railway, and train operations began on August 15, 1883. After undergoing reorganization in 1900, operations continued as the Dardanelle & Russellville Railroad. When originally constructed, the railroad carried cotton and other agricultural products. The predominant traffic shifted to coal by 1900, thanks to extensive semi-anthracite coal production along the railroad. The D&R line was sold on April 21, 1913, to J. G. Puterbaugh, president of McAlester Fuel Company. Coal production along the D&R ended in the mid-1950s when the last underground mines of McAlester Fuel Company were closed.

At one time, the railroad owned the Dardanelle Pontoon Bridge and Turnpike Company, which operated a pontoon bridge (for wagons and later automobiles, not trains) across the Arkansas River at Dardanelle. The D&R was also a leader in the trend for railroads to branch into other transportation modes, owning a highway subsidiary from 1919 to 1960. The highway subsidiary, Dardanelle Transfer Company, operated both bus and truck service over an expanded territory much larger than was served by the railroad itself.
