= Daniel Phillips Upham =

American politician, businessman, and militia commander

Daniel Phillips Upham (more commonly known as D.P. Upham; December 30, 1832 – November 18, 1882) was an American politician, businessman, plantation owner, and Arkansas State Militia commander following the American Civil War. He is best known for his effective and brutal acts as the leader of a successful militia campaign from 1868 to 1869 against Ku Klux Klan chapters in the state. Upham organized a widespread retaliation after the Klan attempted to assassinate him on October 2, 1868. KKK members were responsible for numerous attacks against Republican officeholders and freedmen. Later that year, Upham was designated a brigadier general and commanded a force that eventually numbered over 1,000 men.

== Early life ==
Upham was born on December 30, 1832, in Dudley, Massachusetts, to Josiah Upham and Clarrissa Phillips. Clarrissa was a descendant of Rev. George Phillips, who settled Watertown, Massachusetts in 1630. She died about a week after his birth. Josiah married again in 1836, to Betsy Larned and the couple had four more sons.

Upham received a public education in Dudley.

At the age of 27, he married Elizabeth K. Nash on February 15, 1860. The couple later adopted a daughter named Isabel.

=== Civil War ===
In 1863, Upham was either drafted or he enlisted in the Union Army. He left the army in 1865 at the end of the war and opened a building material business in New York City. However, this business quickly failed, leaving him in debt. In July 1865, Upham reached out to his former commanding officer and business partner, Brigadier General Alexander Shaler, to give him the permits he needed to pay off his debts, a request that Shaler obliged. After finding profit from two saloons and two steamboats, Upham was able to pay off his debts by 1866.

== Reconstruction ==
Soon after his debts were settled, Upham moved to Arkansas to seek his fortune. He purchased and re-opened a cotton plantation in Augusta, which quickly thrived. His success, however, fueled resentment by the ex-Confederate populace, who considered him a Northern carpetbagger thriving off the South's defeat and impoverishment. As Upham's wealth grew, he became a leading Radical Republican and an ally of Governor Powell Clayton. In 1867, he was elected to a seat in the Arkansas House of Representatives based on the votes of freedmen and white Unionists.

Ahead of the 1868 elections, Upham and Clayton pushed the state legislature to ratify the 14th Amendment. The Arkansas Ku Klux Klan gave a violent response, killing 12 people in 3 months, including freedmen, Republicans, and a Freedmen's Bureau agent. The amendment was ratified, but the violence prompted Governor Clayton to form state and local militias to combat the Klan insurgency.

== Militia war ==
Upham was appointed by Clayton as the commander of the local Woodruff County militia. This quickly made him a marked man, and on October 2, 1868, after numerous threats and reported Klan surveillance of his home, Upham and Woodruff County registrar F.A. McLure were ambushed and injured by insurgents under the command of former Confederate Colonel A.C. Pickett.

In early November 1868, Governor Clayton cancelled all elections and declared martial law, splitting the state into four military districts. Upham was put in charge of the Northeastern district, located within the Arkansas Delta. Its large African-American population was the target of frequent Klan attacks and intimidation. Upham gave his men a free hand in subduing the Klan, and the militia's war against them was bloody and ruthless.

[W]e will whale hell out of the last one of them, and never allow one of them to return and live here. There is no other way ... nothing but good, healthy, square, honest killing would ever do them any good.

— D.P. Upham

Enraged by his tactics, a force of about 30 Klansmen rode to Upham's hometown of Augusta and attempted to take over the town. On their way, they pillaged several plantations, including Upham's. They mercilessly beat the black workers, killing one of them. Upham and 100 militiamen arrived in time to prevent the Klan from taking the town. However, upon learning that 300–400 Klan reinforcements were on their way, the militia tore through Augusta, beating and arresting suspected Klansmen. Four suspects died; they were reported killed while attempting to escape, but may have been summarily executed by Upham's forces. In response, 500 Klansmen under Colonel Pickett rode to destroy Upham's plantation, only to find Upham ready and waiting with hundreds of well-trained, well-equipped militiamen. A fierce battle erupted on Upham's property, which ended in a crushing and demoralizing defeat for the Klan. After several more skirmishes, Upham was credited with suppressing the Klan throughout the entire state of Arkansas.

== After the Militia War ==
Upham and his family left Woodruff County and settled in the city of Little Rock, Arkansas in 1869. He invested in real estate and continued to serve in the State Militia. In October 1870, he was appointed brigadier general in command of the Seventh District in central Arkansas.

In 1872, during a period of political and civil troubles that came to be known as the Pope County Militia War, Upham was sent by the governor to provide aid in Pope County "as is or may be necessary to execute the civil and criminal law of the state." The orders gave Upham discretionary power in the use of force and the power to call state guards and enrolled militia into service. Some state guards were utilized in the county during voter registration and the November general election but were dismissed to return home after the election.

In May 1873, Republican governor Elisha Baxter dismissed him from the Arkansas State Militia, along with other men with ties to Powell Clayton, in an attempt to win over ex-Confederates. After being voted out of office, Upham was tried in 1875 for the murder of the four suspected Klansmen in 1868 during the Militia War, but was later acquitted.

In July 1876, President Ulysses S. Grant appointed Upham as U.S. Marshal for the Western District Court in Fort Smith. He served there with honor and distinction, winning massive public support despite early opposition. His career came to an end when a Republican senator plotted for him to be removed in 1880. Upham's attempts to stay in office were thwarted by his former friend and ally, Powell Clayton.

=== Death ===
In November 1882, Upham visited family in Massachusetts. He died of tuberculosis at his father's house in Dudley, on November 18, 1882. His body was returned to Little Rock, and was buried in the city's Oakland Cemetery. His wife and daughter were later interred next to him.

== Legacy ==
In the History Channel TV documentary Aftershock: Beyond the Civil War, Upham is featured prominently, portrayed by Brian Danner.
