= Ozra Amander Hadley =

American politician (1826–1915)

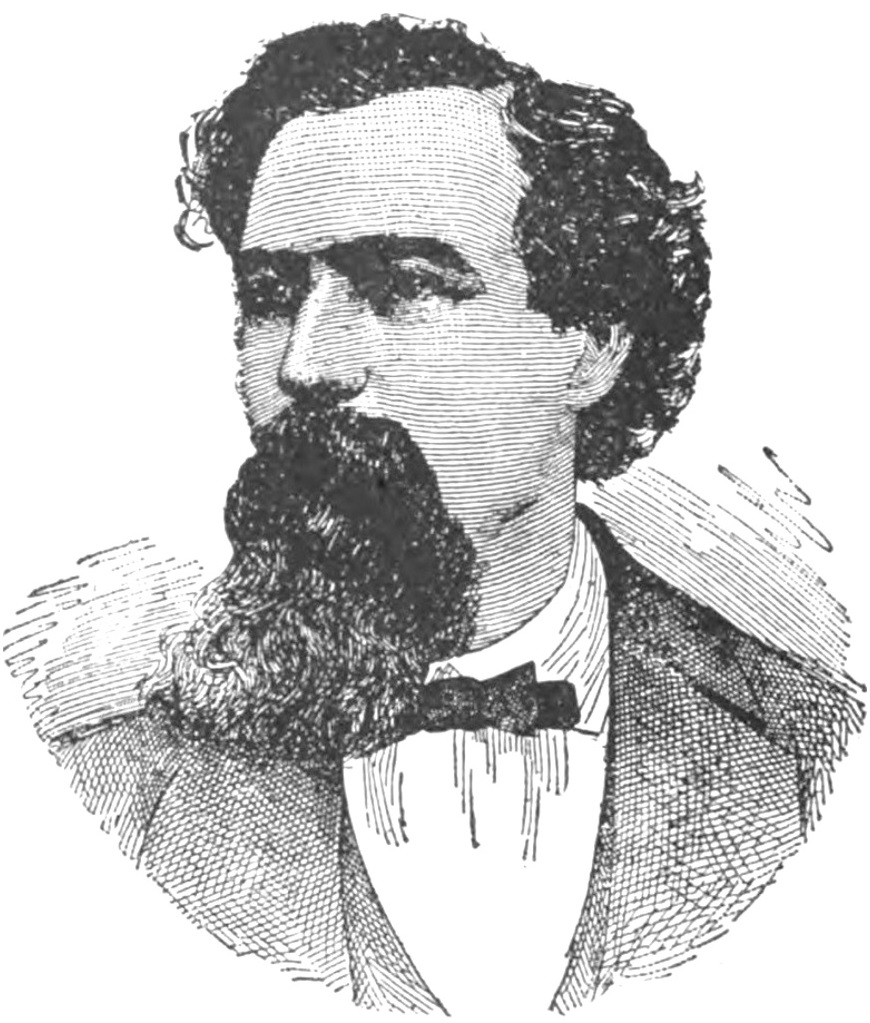

Acting Governor of Arkansas
- In office March 5, 1871 – January 6, 1873
- Preceded by: Powell Clayton
- Succeeded by: Elisha Baxter

Member of the Arkansas Senate from Pulaski County
- In office 1869–1871

Personal details
- Born: June 30, 1826 Cherry Creek, New York, U.S
- Died: July 18, 1915 (aged 89) Mora County, New Mexico, U.S
- Party: Republican
- Education: State University of New York at Fredonia
- Profession: Farmer, merchant, politician, rancher

Ozra (or Ozro) Amander Hadley (June 30, 1826 – July 18, 1915) was an American politician who served as the acting governor of Arkansas from 1871 to 1873. He also served in the Arkansas Senate. A Republican, he was from New York and became a farmer in Minnesota. He also served in local government before moving to Arkansas and opening a general store. After his political career he served in the U.S. Land Office in Little Rock and as a postmaster.

== Early life and education ==
Hadley was born in Cherry Creek, New York, and was educated in the public schools. He attended Fredonia Academy, now State University of New York at Fredonia. Hadley moved to Rochester, Minnesota in 1855, where he was a farmer and became active in local politics and government, including appointment as Olmsted County Auditor. In 1865, he moved to Little Rock, Arkansas, where he opened a general store.

== Political career ==
Hadley was elected as a Republican to serve in the Arkansas Senate from 1869 to 1871; he was elected president of the Senate in 1871. In 1871, as part of a political compromise (see: Brooks-Baxter War), Hadley was appointed acting governor after the resignation of his fellow Republican, Powell Clayton, a controversial figure associated with the Brooks-Baxter War. During his two-year term, Hadley sided with the Radical Republicans during the Reconstruction Era, including efforts to assist former slaves to obtain schooling, own land, vote, and hold office.

During a period of political and civil troubles that came to be called the Pope County Militia War, Major General D. P. Upham was sent by Hadley to provide aid in Pope County "as is or may be necessary to execute the civil and criminal law of the state." The orders gave Upham discretionary power in the use of force and the power to call state guards and enrolled militia into service. Some state guards were utilized in the county during voter registration and the November general election but were dismissed to return home after the election.

After his gubernatorial term, Hadley served as registrar of the U.S. Land Office. He was appointed as Little Rock's postmaster in 1878, and served until 1882.

== Later life ==
In his later years, Hadley moved to Watrous, Mora County, New Mexico, where he developed a ranch. He died in Watrous in 1915.

== See also ==
- National Governors Association
- Brooks–Baxter War
- Arkansas Militia in Reconstruction

Political offices
Preceded by Powell Clayton	Governor of Arkansas; Acting; 1871–1873	Succeeded by Elisha Baxter
