= North Dardanelle, Arkansas =

- Unincorporated community
- North Dardanelle's position in Arkansas. North Dardanelle, Arkansas (the United States)
- Coordinates: 35°13′46″N 93°08′29″W
- Country: United States
- State: Arkansas
- County: Pope
- Elevation: 361 ft (110 m)
- Time zone: UTC-6 (Central (CST))
  - Summer (DST): UTC-5 (CDT)
- GNIS feature ID: 77859

North Dardanelle is an unincorporated community in Illinois Township, Pope County, Arkansas, United States.
