= Arkansas Highway 92 =

State highway in Arkansas, United States

Highway 92

Route information
- Maintained by ArDOT
- Length: 60.7 mi (97.7 km)

Major junctions
- West end: US 64 in Plumerville
- I-40 in Plumerville; AR 9 US 65 in Bee Branch; AR 16 in Greers Ferry
- East end: AR 5 / AR 25 at Drasco

Location
- Country: United States
- State: Arkansas
- Counties: Conway, Van Buren, Cleburne

Highway system
- Arkansas Highway System; Interstate; US; State; Business; Spurs; Suffixed; Scenic; Heritage
← AR 91	→ AR 93

Highway 92 (AR 92 and Hwy. 92) is an east–west state highway in north-central Arkansas. The route of 60.7 miles (97.7 km) runs from US Highway 64 (US 64) in Plumerville to AR 5/AR 25 at Drasco. The route is maintained by the Arkansas Department of Transportation (ARDOT).

== Route description ==
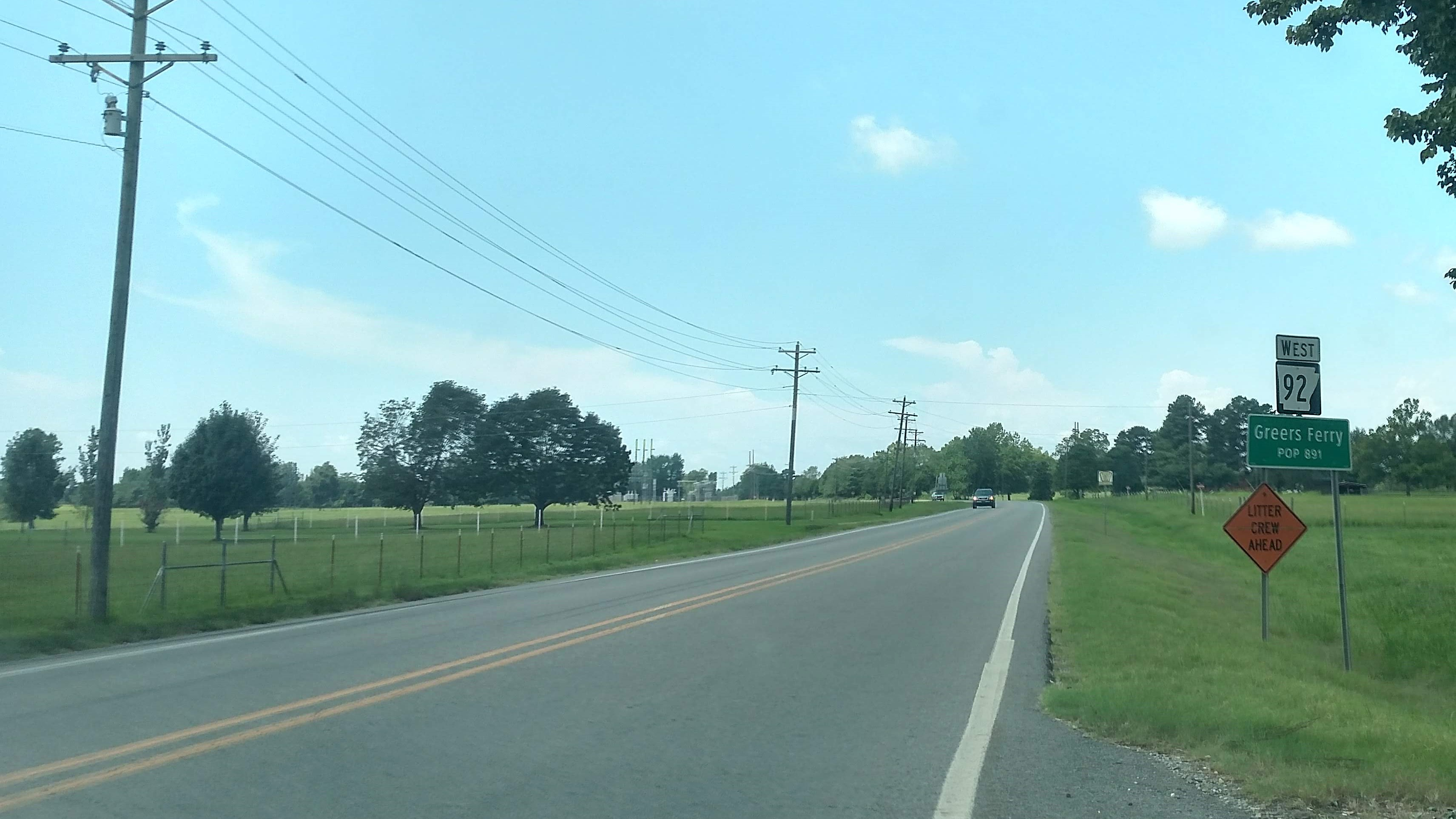
Entering Greers Ferry

AR 92 begins at US 64 in Plumerville. The route crosses Interstate 40 and continues north through Conway County. A concurrency begins with AR 124 in Springfield and also AR 9 north of Springfield. The AR 9/AR 92/AR 124 concurrency continues north to Center Ridge, when AR 124 turns west, AR 9 heads north, and AR 92 turns east. The highway enters Van Buren County, where it intersects US 65 at Bee Branch and runs near Greers Ferry Lake before entering Cleburne County. The highway continues east to concur with AR 16, cross Greers Ferry Lake, and enter the community of Greers Ferry. Continuing east, AR 92 winds to Drasco, where the route terminates at AR 5/AR 25.

== Major intersections ==
County	Location	mi	km	Destinations	Notes
Conway	Plumerville	0.0	0.0	US 64 (Main Street)	Western terminus
Conway	Plumerville	0.2	0.32	I-40 – Fort Smith, Little Rock	Exit 112 on I-40
Conway		1.6	2.6	AR 287 west – Morrilton	Eastern terminus of AR 287
Conway	Springfield	10.2	16.4	AR 124 east – Damascus	Western end of concurrency with AR 124
Conway		13.5	21.7	AR 9 south – Morrilton	Western end of concurrency with AR 9
Conway	Center Ridge	17.7	28.5	AR 124 west – Cleveland	Eastern end of concurrency with AR 124
Conway	Center Ridge	18	29	AR 9 north – Clinton	Eastern end of concurrency with AR 9
Van Buren	Rabbit Ridge	24.3	39.1	AR 285 south – Damascus	Northern terminus of AR 285
Van Buren	Bee Branch	31.2	50.2	US 65 – Clinton, Conway	
Van Buren		34	55	AR 356 east	Western terminus of AR 356
Van Buren		43.4	69.8	AR 337 west – Sugar Loaf Recreation Area	Eastern terminus of AR 337
Cleburne		44.7	71.9	AR 16 east (Edgemont Road) to AR 25	Western end of concurrency with AR 16
Cleburne		46.9	75.5	AR 336 west (Higden Road) – Higden	Eastern temrinus of AR 336
Cleburne	Greers Ferry	48.7	78.4	AR 110 east (Shiloh Road)	Western terminus of AR 110
Cleburne	Greers Ferry	49.2	79.2	AR 16 west (Edgemont Road) – Shirley	Eastern end of concurrency with AR 16
Cleburne	Greers Ferry	52.2	84.0	AR 225 north (Sunny Slope Road) – Hill Creek Recreation Area	Southern terminus of AR 225
Cleburne		54.8	88.2	AR 263 north (Prim Road) – Prim	Southern terminus of AR 263
Cleburne	Drasco	60.7	97.7	AR 5 / AR 25 (Heber Springs Road) – Concord, Heber Springs	Eastern terminus
1.000 mi = 1.609 km; 1.000 km = 0.621 mi
