= Arkansas Highway 337 =

State highway in Arkansas, United States

Highway 337
- AR 337 highlighted in red

Route information
- Maintained by ArDOT
- Existed: June 23, 1965–present

Section 1
- Length: 1.40 mi (2.25 km)
- South end: AR 92
- North end: Sugar Loaf Use Area

Section 2
- Length: 7.89 mi (12.70 km)
- South end: AR 16
- North end: AR 5 / AR 25

Location
- Country: United States
- State: Arkansas
- Counties: Cleburne, Van Buren

Highway system
- Arkansas Highway System; Interstate; US; State; Business; Spurs; Suffixed; Scenic; Heritage
← AR 336	→ AR 338

Highway 337 (AR 337, Ark. 337, and Hwy. 337) is a designation for two state highways in the Ozarks. One segment connects Sugar Loaf Mountain Use Area to Highway 92, and the second connects Highway 5/Highway 25 and Highway 16 southeast of Heber Springs. Both routes are maintained by the Arkansas Department of Transportation (ArDOT).

== Route description ==
=== Van Buren County ===
Highway 337 begins near the Van Buren/Cleburne county line in the Ozark Mountains. The southern terminus is an intersection with Highway 92, and runs almost due west, but is signed north–south due to Arkansas's signing convention for odd-numbered routes. The highway terminates at the border of the Sugar Loaf Use Area on Greers Ferry Lake, which is owned and maintained by the United States Army Corps of Engineers (USACE, or "the Corps"). The campground has 57 RV/tent sites, two boat ramps, and the Sugar Loaf Mountain Nature Trail.

As of 2016, the route had an annual average daily traffic (AADT) of 280 vehicles per day (VPD), earning a classification as a very low volume local road by the American Association of State Highway and Transportation Officials (AASHTO), meaning fewer than 400 vehicles per day.

=== Cleburne County ===
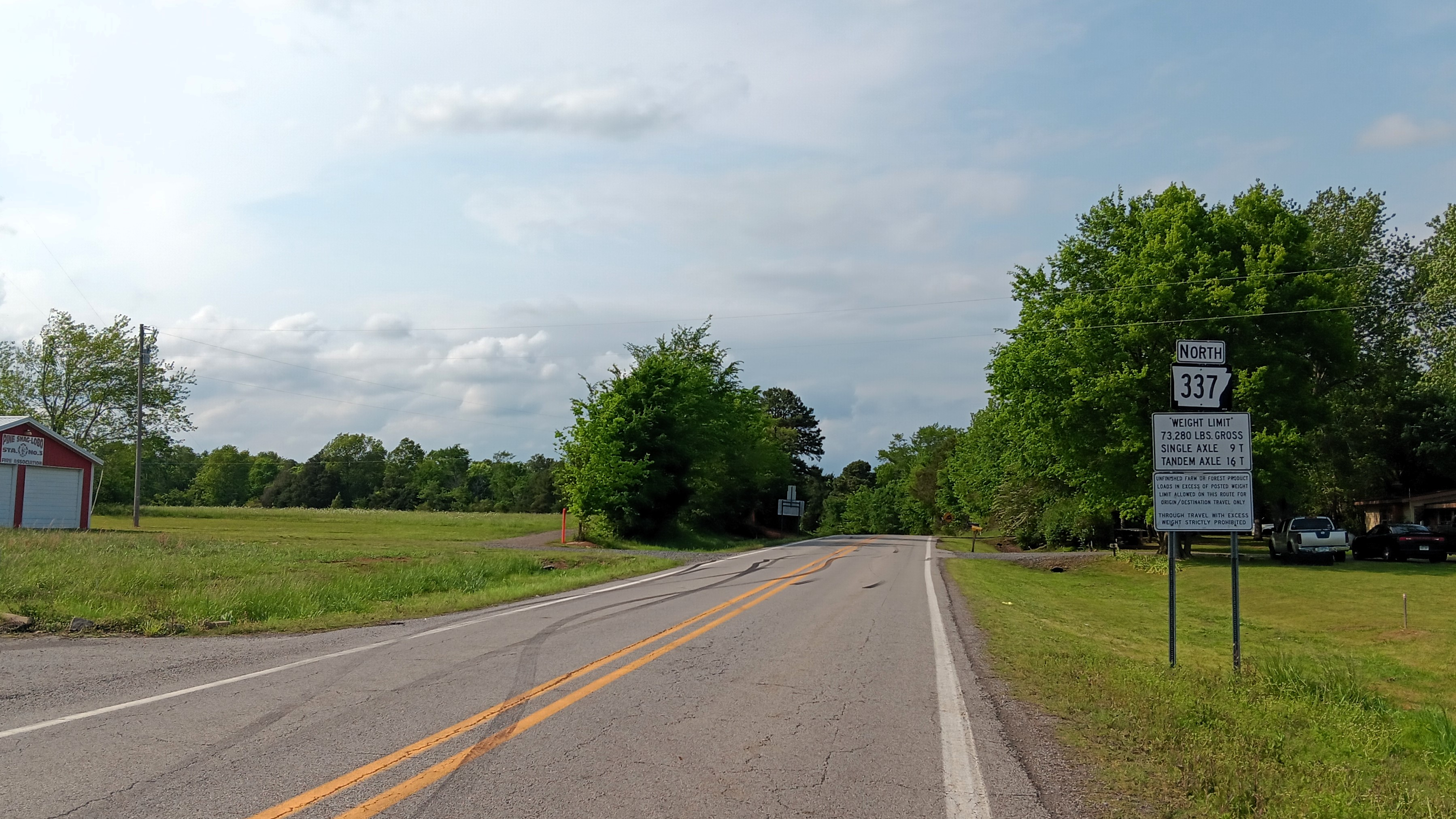
First reassurance marker for Arkansas Highway 337 west of the Highway 16 junction in West Pangburn, Arkansas

Highway 337 begins at Highway 5/Highway 25 southeast of Heber Springs. It runs southeast to an industrial area before paralleling the Little Red River. The route turns south and intersects Highway 16, where it terminates.

Near the eastern terminus, the AADT was measured as 1,600 VPD in 2016.

== Major intersections ==
County	Location	mi	km	Destinations	Notes
Van Buren		0.00	0.00	AR 92 – Greers Ferry	Southern terminus
Van Buren		1.40	2.25	Sugar Loaf Use Area	Northern terminus
Gap in route
Cleburne		0.00	0.00	AR 16 – Pangburn, Searcy, Heber Springs	Southern terminus
Cleburne		7.89	12.70	AR 5 / AR 25	Northern terminus
1.000 mi = 1.609 km; 1.000 km = 0.621 mi

== History ==
Highway 337 was first created on June 23, 1965, from Sugar Loaf Mountain to Highway 92. Two months later, the route was swapped with a county road to the current routing. The second route was created on June 28, 1973, from Highway 110 toward an industrial park and Highway 912. This route was extended over the gap between Highway 337 and Highway 912, and replaced Highway 912 to the Highway 16 intersection. Following a realignment project in 1991, Highway 337 was truncated at Highway 5/Highway 25.

== See also ==
- List of state highways in Arkansas
