= Greers Ferry =

Greers Ferry may refer to one of several places in Arkansas:

- Greers Ferry, Arkansas, a city in Cleburne County
- Greers Ferry Lake, a reservoir in Cleburne and Van Buren counties
- Greers Ferry Dam, which impounds the lake of the same name
