= List of lakes of Cleburne County, Arkansas =

There are at least 15 named lakes and reservoirs in Cleburne County, Arkansas.

== Lakes ==
- Trestle Hole, 35°33′12″N 091°49′51″W, el. 476 feet (145 m)

Greers Ferry Dam impounds the Little Red River and forms Greers Ferry Lake.

== Reservoirs ==
- Betty Brown Lake, 35°30′00″N 091°57′43″W, el. 262 feet (80 m)
- Bullard Lake, 35°40′59″N 091°51′34″W, el. 912 feet (278 m)
- Dunaway Lake, 35°30′42″N 092°12′40″W, el. 833 feet (254 m)
- Greers Ferry Lake, 35°31′57″N 092°12′16″W, el. 463 feet (141 m)
- Greers Ferry Nursery Pond, 35°34′36″N 092°13′13″W, el. 482 feet (147 m)
- Grisso Lake, 35°27′35″N 091°57′01″W, el. 269 feet (82 m)
- Kennedy Lake, 35°26′54″N 092°13′25″W, el. 761 feet (232 m)
- Lake Eden, 35°29′55″N 092°06′16″W, el. 492 feet (150 m)
- Magness Lake, 35°29′25″N 091°55′59″W, el. 276 feet (84 m)
- Miss Jenny Lake, 35°29′54″N 092°14′43″W, el. 886 feet (270 m)
- Parish Lake, 35°22′48″N 092°01′31″W, el. 725 feet (221 m)
- Rodgers Lake, 35°33′06″N 092°06′49″W, el. 584 feet (178 m)
- Sherlock Lake, 35°28′12″N 091°59′25″W, el. 302 feet (92 m)
- Stair Lake, 35°42′42″N 091°56′43″W, el. 1,148 feet (350 m)

== See also ==
- List of lakes in Arkansas
