= Arkansas Highway 336 =

State highway in Arkansas, United States

Highway 336
- AR 336 highlighted in red

Route information
- Maintained by ArDOT
- Existed: January 12, 1966–present

Section 1
- Length: 11.155 mi (17.952 km)
- West end: AR 9 at Formosa
- East end: US 65 / AR 9 in Clinton

Section 2
- Length: 0.876 mi (1,410 m)
- West end: Higden Road in Higden
- East end: AR 16 in Higden

Location
- Country: United States
- State: Arkansas

Highway system
- Arkansas Highway System; Interstate; US; State; Business; Spurs; Suffixed; Scenic; Heritage
← AR 335	→ AR 337

Highway 336 (AR 336, Ark. 336, and Hwy. 336) is a designation for two east–west state highways in the Arkansas Ozarks. Both are low traffic, two-lane, highways near Greers Ferry Lake. The longer segment was created in 1966, with the Higden segment created in 1972. Both current segments are maintained by the Arkansas Department of Transportation (ArDOT).

== Route description ==
The ArDOT maintains Highway 336 like all other parts of the state highway system. As a part of these responsibilities, the department tracks the volume of traffic using its roads in surveys using a metric called average annual daily traffic (AADT). ArDOT estimates the traffic level for a segment of roadway for any average day of the year in these surveys. As of 2018, estimates were 850 vehicles per day (VPD) near Culpepper and 460 VPD near the western terminus. As of 2018, estimates in Higden were 260 VPD. Highways under 400 VPD are classified as very low volume local road by the American Association of State Highway and Transportation Officials (AASHTO).

No segment of Highway 336 is part of the National Highway System (NHS), a network of roads important to the nation's economy, defense, and mobility.

=== Van Buren County ===
Highway 336 begins in the unincorporated community of Formosa in southern Van Buren County near the Conway County line. The road winds through a rural area, crossing Wolf Pen Hollow before climbing Culpepper Mountain, where it passes the community of Culpepper. The route runs northeast to U.S. Highway 65 (US 65, and an unsigned Highway 9) in Clinton where it terminates near the Ozark Health Medical Center.

=== Cleburne County ===
A second segment of Highway 336 begins in the small town of Higden within Cleburne County at an intersection with Highway 16 near Greers Ferry Lake. The highway runs due north as Higden Road through a residential area before turning slightly west toward the lake. State maintenance ends along the curve, with the roadway continuing as a city street.

== Major intersections ==
County	Location	mi	km	Destinations	Notes
Van Buren	Formosa	0.00	0.00	AR 9 – Center Ridge, Morrilton, Choctaw, Clinton	Western terminus
Van Buren	Clinton	11.155	17.952	US 65 / AR 9 – Clinton, Conway	Eastern terminus
Gap in route
Cleburne	Higden	0.000	0.000	Begin state maintenance, roadway continues as Higden Road	Western terminus
Cleburne	Higden	0.876	1.410	AR 16	Eastern terminus
1.000 mi = 1.609 km; 1.000 km = 0.621 mi

== History ==
The Arkansas State Highway Commission designated a second segment of Highway 336 along a county road between US 65 and Culpepper on January 12, 1966. The Higden segment was designated on October 25, 1972, to restore Higden's access to the state highway system following the creation of Greers Ferry Lake. Highway 366 was extended from Culpepper to the western terminus on May 23, 1973, following Act 9 of 1973 by the Arkansas General Assembly. The act directed county judges and legislators to designate up to 12 miles (19 km) of county roads as state highways in each county.

== See also ==
- Arkansas Highway 336 (1965–2013), former alignment in Van Buren County
