= Westside School =

Westside School can refer to many schools including:

- Westside School (Gibraltar)
- Las Vegas Grammar School (Washington and D Streets, Las Vegas, Nevada) or Westside School
- Westside School, now the Garfield School in the Olympia School District in Thurston County, Washington, U.S.

== See also ==
- Westside High School (disambiguation)
- Westside School District. Johnson County, Arkansas
- West Side School District, Cleburne County, Arkansas
- Westside Consolidated School District, Craighead County, Arkansas
