= West Side High School (Greers Ferry, Arkansas) =

Public school in Greers Ferry, Arkansas, US

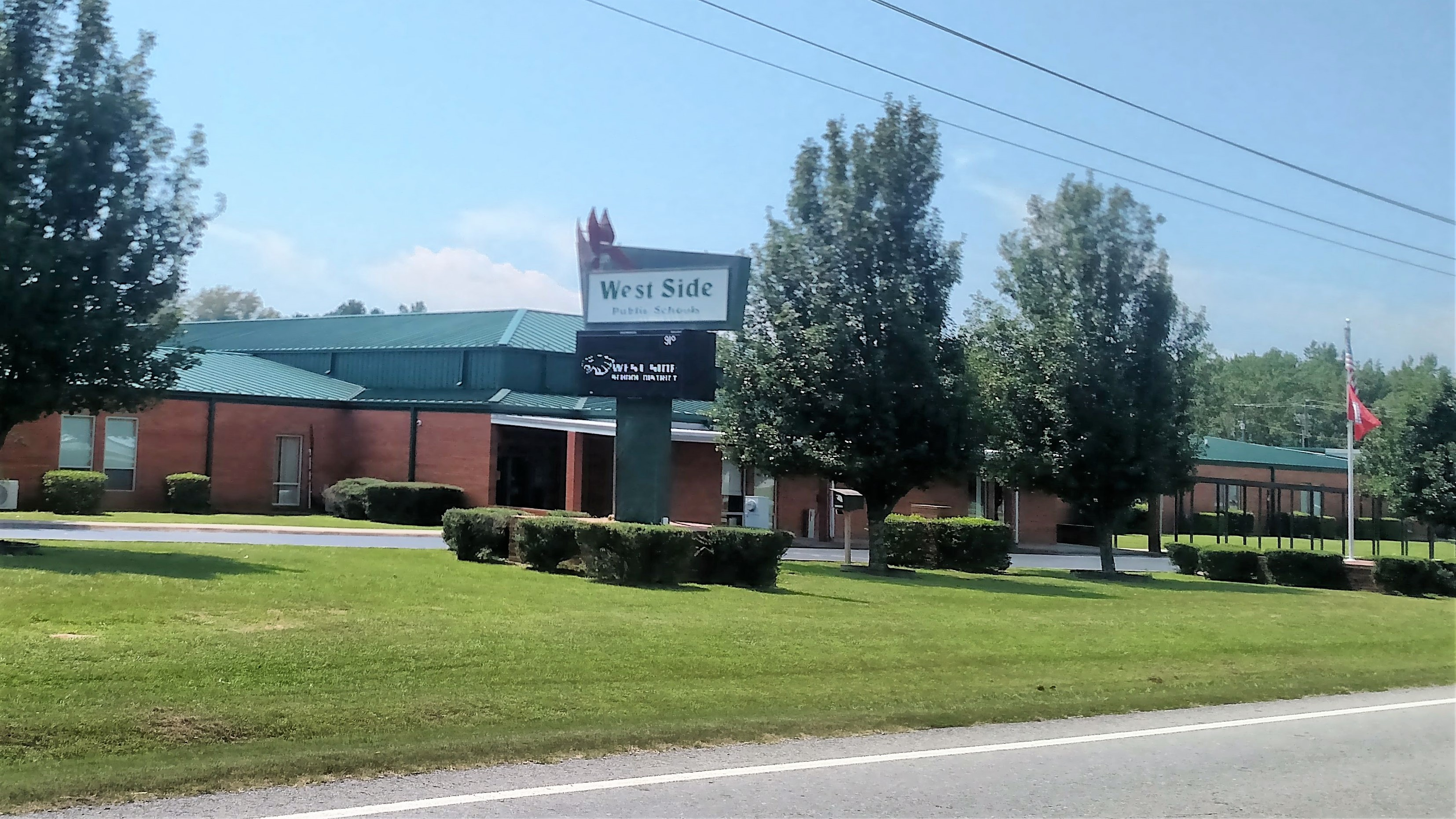

Location
- 7295 Greers Ferry Road; Greers Ferry, Arkansas 72067-9416; United States
- Coordinates: 35°34′40″N 92°10′34″W

Information
- School type: Public comprehensive
- Established: 1949 (77 years ago)
- Status: Open
- School district: West Side School District
- Superintendent: Andy Chisum
- CEEB code: 041065
- NCES School ID: 051404001147
- Principal: Gary Nipper
- Teaching staff: 25.26 (on FTE basis)
- Grades: 7–12
- Enrollment: 246 (2010–11)
  - Grade 7: 47
  - Grade 8: 47
  - Grade 9: 41
  - Grade 10: 34
  - Grade 11: 42
  - Grade 12: 35
- Student to teacher ratio: 9.74
- Education system: ADE Smart Core
- Classes offered: Regular, Advanced Placement (AP)
- Colors: Green and white
- Athletics: Basketball, Golf, Cross Country, Baseball, Softball, Tennis
- Athletics conference: 1A 2 South (2012–14)
- Mascot: Eagle
- Team name: West Side Eagles
- Accreditation: ADE
- Communities served: Higden, Bee Branch, Quitman, Heber Springs, Prim, Edgemont, Shirley, Fairfield Bay, Greers Ferry, and Drasco
- Federal funding: Title I
- Website: www.westsideeagles.org

West Side High School is a comprehensive public high school located in the rural, distant community of Greers Ferry, Arkansas, United States. The high school provides secondary education for students in grades 7 through 12 for more than 147.81 square miles (382.8 km^{2}) of land that includes all or portions of Cleburne County and Van Buren County communities including: Higden, Bee Branch, Quitman, Heber Springs, Prim, Edgemont, Shirley, Fairfield Bay, Greers Ferry, and Drasco.

== History ==
Established in 1949, West Side High School was founded for students in grades 9 through 12. Two years later in 1951, the district expanded the campus for grades 1 through 8. Seven students are members of the first graduating class. In 1956, a gymnasium was built and used for the school's indoor sports and for large events until the newly constructed gym was built in 2009. In 1961, the school's library opened and by 1965 enrollment had reached more than 300 students. In 1973, the girls' basketball program was started by coach Eddy Hipp who remained with the school until retirement in 2004 leading the Lady Eagles to a 735–287 record during that time. Enrollment continued to increase throughout the years with more than 450 students by 1980 and more than 500 students by 2005. In 2011, the district constructed and opened new baseball and softball fields.

== Academics ==
West Side High School is accredited by the Arkansas Department of Education (ADE) and the assumed course of study follows the Smart Core curriculum developed by the ADE, which requires students complete at least 22 units prior to graduation. Students complete regular (core and elective) and career focus courses and exams and may take Advanced Placement (AP) courses and exam with the opportunity to receive college credit. West Side receives Title I federal funding.

West Side is one of twenty high schools to be recognized with the 2012 College Readiness Award by the Arkansas ACT Council in recognition of improving the participation rate of students taking the ACT college readiness exam.

== Athletics ==
The West Side High School mascot and athletic emblem is the Eagle with green and white serving as the school colors.

The West Side Eagles compete in interscholastic activities within the 1A Classification—the state's smallest classification—from the 1A 2 South Conference, as administered by the Arkansas Activities Association. The Eagles participate in golf (boys/girls), cross country (boys/girls), basketball (boys/girls), baseball, fastpitch softball, tennis (boys/girls) and cheer.

Beyond conference, district and regional championships, West Side Eagle teams have won state championships including:

- 1983 - Class A State Basketball Championship (Boys)
- 1995 - Class B State Basketball Championship (Girls)
- 2006 - Class 1A/2A State Cross Country Championship (Girls)
- 2007 - Class 1A State Softball Championship
- 2007 - Overall State Athletic Award Winner
- 2010 - Class 1A State Golf Championship (Girls)

Other notables years of success include:

- 2003 - Sr. Girls - State Elite Eight (record: 30–10)
- 2004 - Sr. Girls - State Elite Eight (record: 33–9)
- 2007 - Baseball Final Four
- 2008 - Baseball Final Four
- 2009 - Baseball Final Four
- 2010 - Baseball State Finalist/Runner-Up
- 2011 - Softball Final Four
- 2012 - Boys' Basketball Elite Eight
