= Livestock and Equipment Barn, Glenn Homestead =

- U.S. National Register of Historic Places
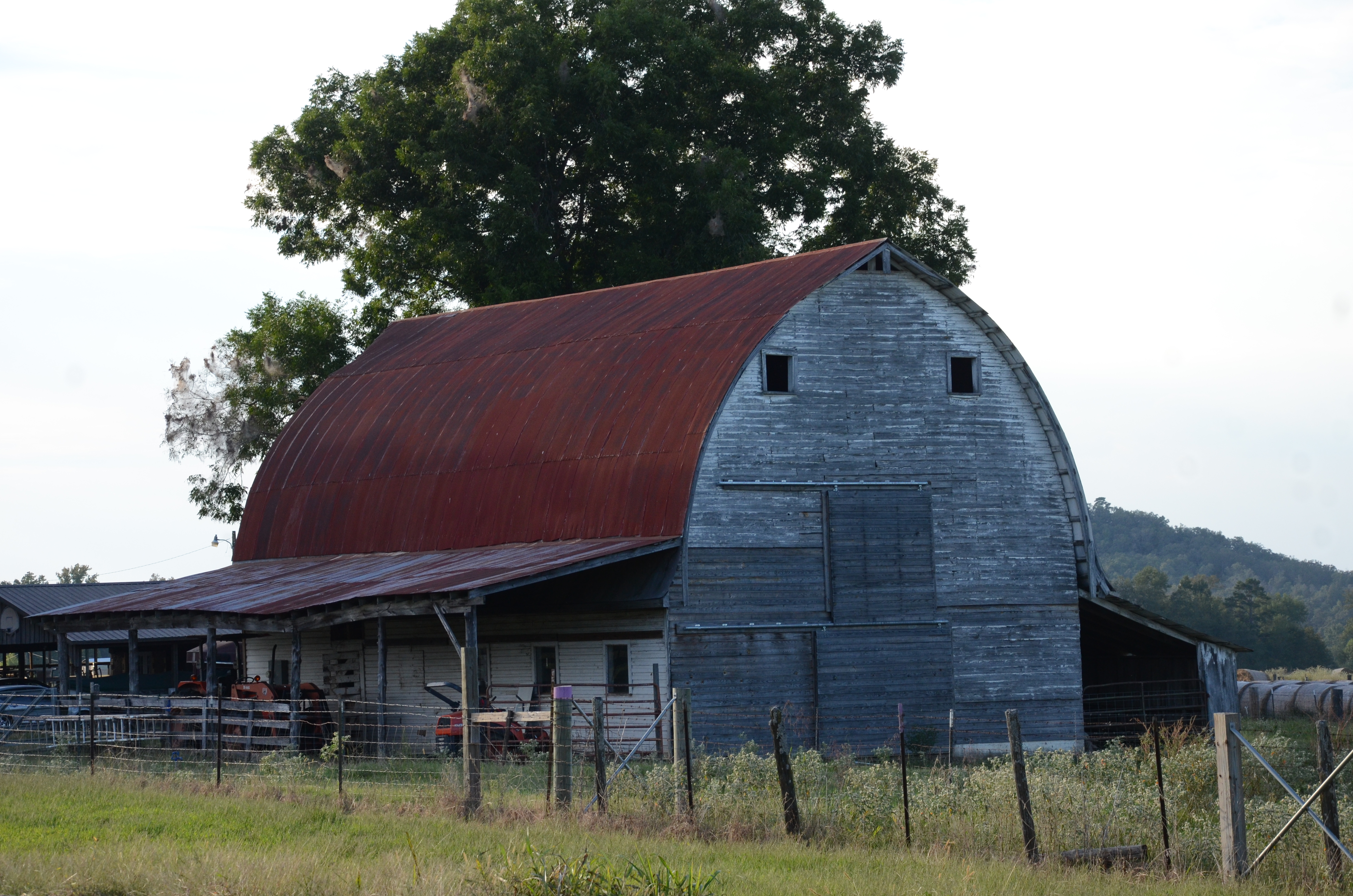

- Location within Arkansas Location within the United States
- Nearest city: Pangburn, Arkansas
- Coordinates: 35°25′51.2″N 91°48′9.3″W
- Area: less than one acre
- Architectural style: Round-roof barn
- MPS: White County MPS
- NRHP reference No.: 91001287
- Added to NRHP: July 20, 1992

The Livestock and Equipment Barn of the Glenn Homestead is a historic farm outbuilding in rural northern White County, Arkansas. It is located on the north side of Arkansas Highway 124, several miles east of the city of Pangburn. It is a two-story frame structure, clad in novelty siding and set on a concrete foundation. Its main section has a visually distinctive rounded roof, with open shed-roofed equipment wings on the sides. Built about 1939, it is the only known round-roofed barn in the county.

The building was listed on the National Register of Historic Places in 1992.

== See also ==
- National Register of Historic Places listings in White County, Arkansas
