= Zachariah Bradford Jennings =

American politician

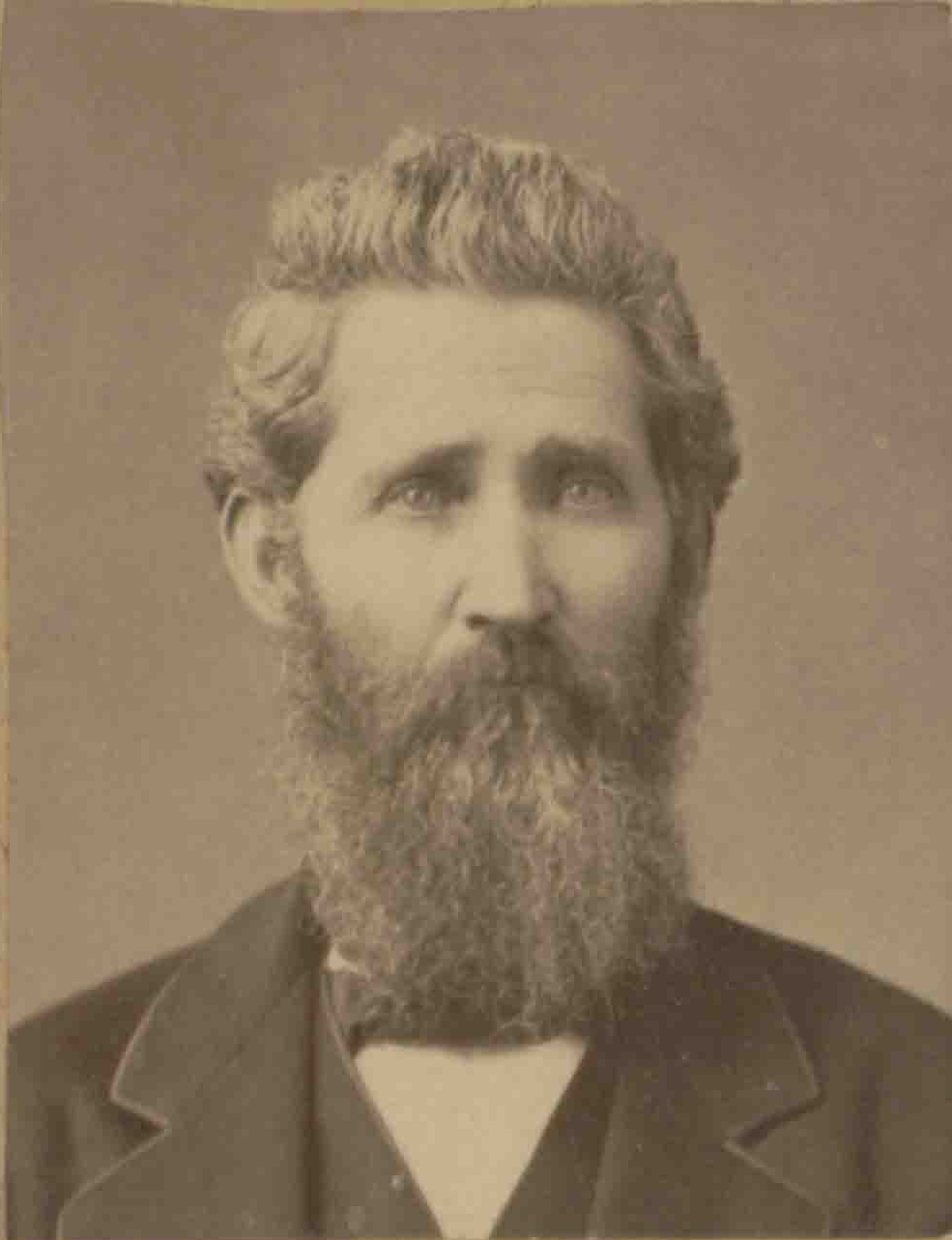
circa 1881

Zachariah Bradford Jennings was a state legislator in Arkansas. He served in the Arkansas House of Representatives and the Arkansas Senate. He proposed the bill to establish Cleburne County, Arkansas in the Arkansas Senate.

He lived in Van Buren County. In 1881 he represented Van Buren County in the Arkansas House. He served in the Arkansas Senate in 1883 and 1885. In 1884 he was elected to the Arkansas Senate along with 29 other Democrats, a Greenbacker, and a Republican.
