= Patman House =

Historic house in Arkansas, United States

- U.S. National Register of Historic Places
- Location within Arkansas Location within the United States
- Location: Jct. of Mountain and Jackson Sts., Pangburn, Arkansas
- Coordinates: 35°25′17″N 91°50′30″W
- Area: less than one acre
- Built: 1920
- Architectural style: Colonial Revival, Vernacular double-pen
- MPS: White County MPS
- NRHP reference No.: 91001292
- Added to NRHP: September 5, 1991

The Patman House was a historic house at Mountain and Jackson Streets in Pangburn, Arkansas. It was a 1 1/2-story T-shaped wood-frame structure, with a dormered gable roof, novelty siding, and a foundation of brick piers. It had modest vernacular Colonial Revival styling. It was built in the 1890s as a frame version of a dogtrot, but was significantly altered in the early 1920s, after Pangburn achieved prosperity as a railroad town.

The house was listed on the National Register of Historic Places in 1991. It has been listed as demolished in the Arkansas Historic Preservation Program database.

== See also ==
- National Register of Historic Places listings in White County, Arkansas
