= Pangburn High School =

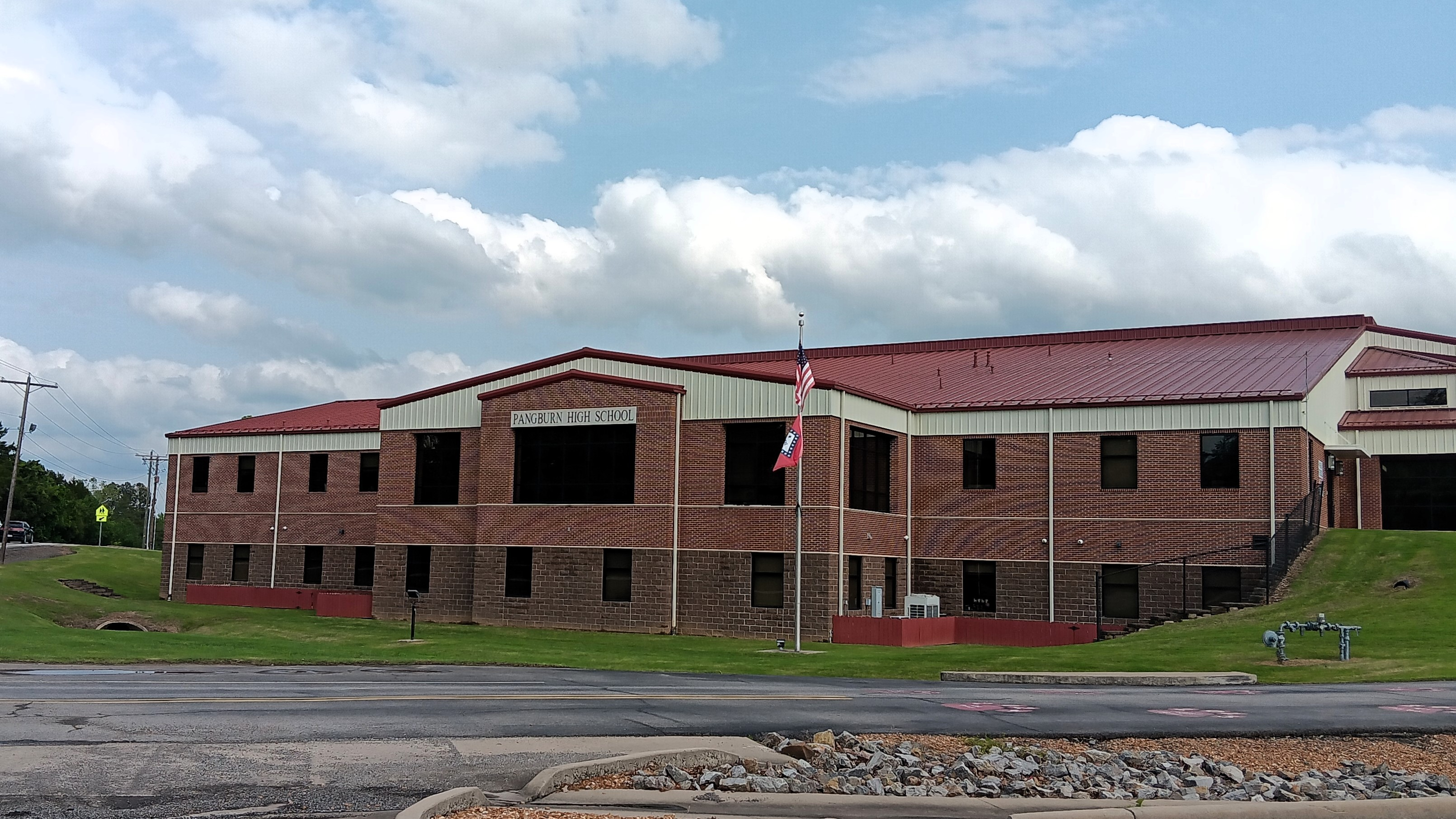

Location
- 1100 Short Street; Pangburn, Arkansas; United States
- Coordinates: 35°25′45″N 91°50′10″W

Information
- Type: Public
- Superintendent: David Rolland
- CEEB code: 041940
- NCES School ID: 051107000835
- Principal: Chris Collett
- Teaching staff: 62.49 (on FTE basis)
- Grades: 9–12
- Enrollment: 348 (2023–2024)
- Student to teacher ratio: 5.57
- Colors: Red and white
- Athletics conference: Class 2A
- Mascot: Tiger
- Team name: Pangburn Tigers
- Website: www.pangburnschools.org

Pangburn High School is a public high school that provides comprehensive education to students in grades 7 through 12 in Pangburn, Arkansas, United States. Pangburn High School is one of nine public high schools in White County, Arkansas and the only high school of Pangburn School District.

== Academics ==
The assumed course of study for students follows the Smart Core curriculum developed by the Arkansas Department of Education (ADE). Students complete regular (core and career focus) courses and exams and may select Advanced Placement (AP) courses and exams that provide an opportunity to receive college credit. Students at Pangburn High School have the opportunity to take a wide variety of courses. The high school offers courses in English, science, mathematics, history, art, music, Spanish, drama and oral communications, business, law, sociology, family and consumer sciences and agriculture. In addition, many courses are offered via the school's two distance learning labs. The distance learning courses include many AP courses, as well as specialized courses in medicine and other fields. In addition, the school works with ASU-Heber Springs to allow students to take concurrent mechanical classes at the college and with the Searcy Beauty College to allow students interested in cosmetology to begin their classes while in high school.

== Extracurricular activities ==
The Pangburn High School mascot and athletic emblem is the Tiger with red and white serving as the schools colors.

=== Athletics ===
For 2012–14, the Pangburn Tigers compete in the 2A Classification level within the 2A Region 2 Conference as administered by the Arkansas Activities Association. Pangburn High School fields teams in golf (boys/girls), cross country (boys/girls), basketball (boys/girls), baseball, softball, shooting sports, and cheer.

Basketball is one of the most attended sporting events at Pangburn. In recent years, both basketball teams have enjoyed success on the district level and moderate success on the regional level. The softball team also is competitive at a district and state level.

=== Band ===
In 2006, the Pangburn School Band was invited as one of two school bands to represent Arkansas at the National Anthem Project in Washington, D.C. The band performed a concert in front of the U.S. Capitol building. Later, the band performed as part of a mass choir for the opening ceremony of DCI at Navy-Marine Corps Memorial Stadium in Annapolis, Maryland.
