= Higden, Arkansas =

- Town
- Location of Higden in Cleburne County, Arkansas.
- Coordinates: 35°34′00″N 92°12′18″W
- Country: United States
- State: Arkansas
- County: Cleburne

Area
  - Total: 0.49 sq mi (1.26 km^{2})
  - Land: 0.49 sq mi (1.26 km^{2})
  - Water: 0 sq mi (0.00 km^{2})
- Elevation: 512 ft (156 m)

Population (2020)
  - Total: 114
  - Estimate (2025): 116 ▲
  - Density: 235.2/sq mi (90.81/km^{2})
- Time zone: UTC-6 (Central (CST))
  - Summer (DST): UTC-5 (CDT)
- ZIP code: 72067
- Area code: 501
- FIPS code: 05-32080
- GNIS feature ID: 2405826

Higden is an incorporated town (1909) in Cleburne County, Arkansas, United States. As of the 2020 census, Higden had a population of 114.

== Geography ==
Higden is located in western Cleburne County on the south and west shores of Greers Ferry Lake, a reservoir on the Little Red River. Arkansas Highways 16 and 92 run along the southern edge of the town and cross the lake at The Narrows, connecting Higden to Greers Ferry on the east shore.

According to the United States Census Bureau, Higden has a total area of 0.46 square miles (1.2 km^{2}), all land.

Before Greers Ferry Lake was built, Higden moved to a hill. Some area residents claim that some homes and buildings are still underwater today in the lake.

== Demographics ==
Historical population
Census	Pop.	Note	%±
1910	336		—
1920	220		−34.5%
1930	142		−35.5%
1940	181		27.5%
1950	115		−36.5%
1960	40		−65.2%
1970	46		15.0%
1980	45		−2.2%
1990	92		104.4%
2000	101		9.8%
2010	120		18.8%
2020	114		−5.0%
2025 (est.)	116	▲	1.8%
U.S. Decennial Census

At the 2000 census, there were 101 people, 52 households and 34 families residing in the town. The population density was 86.7/km^{2} (225.7/mi^{2}). There were 141 housing units at an average density of 121.0/km^{2} (315.1/mi^{2}). The racial makeup of the town was 94.06% White, 2.97% Native American, 0.99% from other races, and 1.98% from two or more races. 4.95% of the population were Hispanic or Latino of any race.

There were 52 households, of which 15.4% had children under the age of 18 living with them, 61.5% were married couples living together, 5.8% had a female householder with no husband present, and 32.7% were non-families. 30.8% of all households were made up of individuals, and 19.2% had someone living alone who was 65 years of age or older. The average household size was 1.94 and the average family size was 2.37.

11.9% of the population were under the age of 18, 3.0% from 18 to 24, 15.8% from 25 to 44, 36.6% from 45 to 64, and 32.7% who were 65 years of age or older. The median age was 54 years. For every 100 females, there were 98.0 males. For every 100 females age 18 and over, there were 93.5 males.

The median household income was $41,875 and the median family income was $48,750. Males had a median income of $31,250 and females $23,750. The per capita income was $22,133. There were 14.3% of families and 19.6% of the population living below the poverty line, including 36.8% of those under 18 and none of those over 64.

== Education ==
Public education for Higden students is supported by the West Side School District in its elementary school and West Side High School. The district encompasses more than 147.81 square miles (382.8 km^{2}) of land that includes all or portions of Cleburne County and Van Buren County communities, including Higden, Prim, Edgemont, Fairfield Bay and Greers Ferry.
