= WSHS =

WSHS may refer to the following schools:

Multiple countries

- Woodbridge Senior High School (disambiguation)

Australia

- Westfields Sports High School
- Willetton Senior High School in Willetton, Western Australia
- Wynnum State High School in Brisbane, Queensland

United States

- Williamsville South High School in Williamsville, New York
- Wallkill Senior High School
- West Salem High School (Oregon) in Salem, Oregon
- West Salem High School (Wisconsin) in West Salem, Wisconsin
- West Scranton High School
- West Seattle High School
- West Side High School (disambiguation)
- West Shamokin High School
- West Shores High School
- West Springfield High School (Virginia)
- White Station High School in Memphis, Tennessee
- Winona Senior High School in Winona County, Minnesota
- Winter Springs High School in Winter Springs, Florida

== WSHS may also refer to ==
- WSHS (FM), a high school/public radio station in Sheboygan, Wisconsin
- An acronym for the Washington State Historical Society
- Western Steppe Herders, an ethno-cultural ancestral group in the Eneolithic and Bronze Age
