= McAdams House =

Historic house in Arkansas, United States

- U.S. National Register of Historic Places
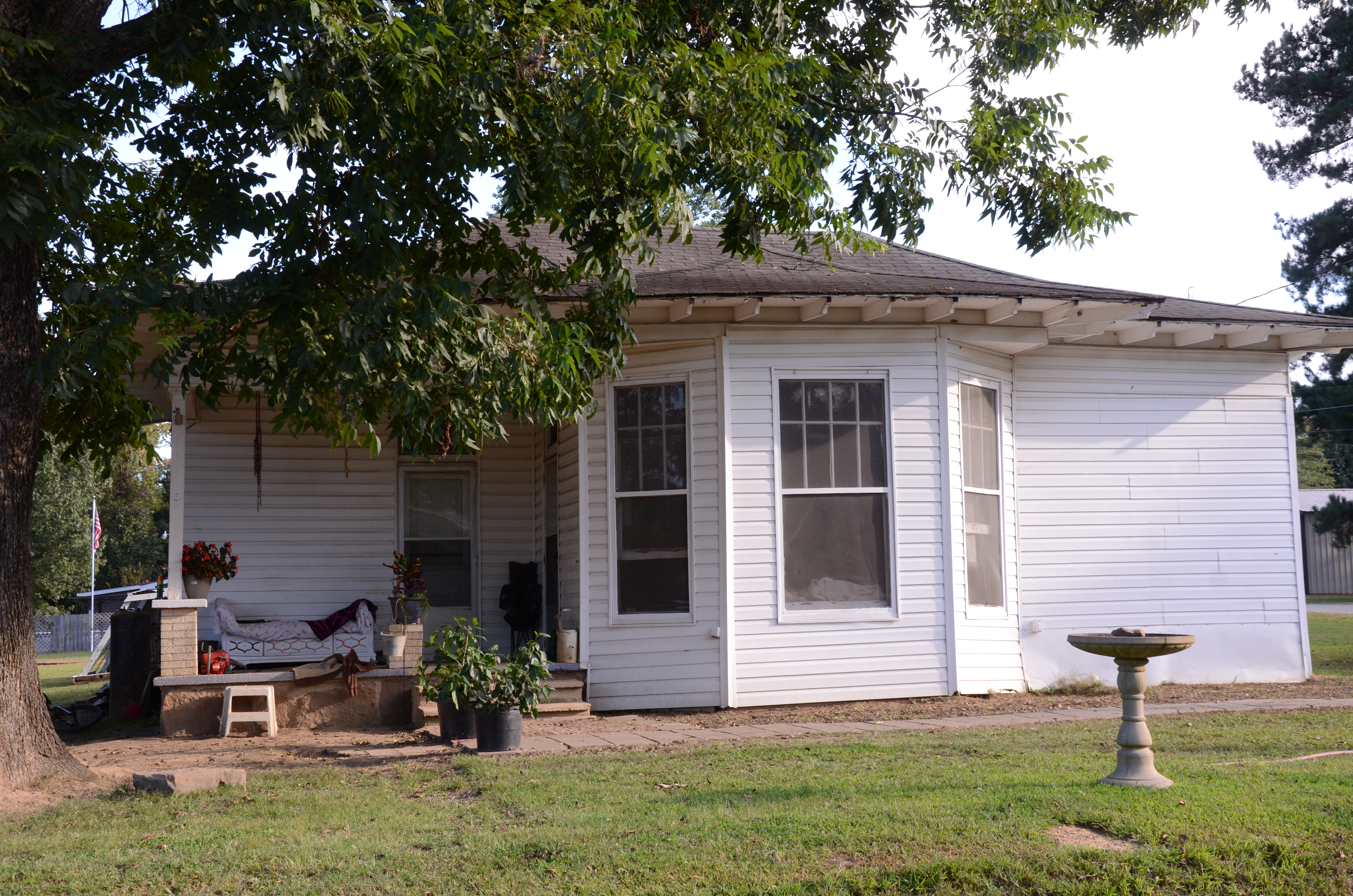

- Location within Arkansas Location within the United States
- Location: Jct. of Maple and South Sts., Pangburn, Arkansas
- Coordinates: 35°25′21″N 91°50′25″W
- Area: less than one acre
- Built: 1915
- Architectural style: Vernacular irregular plan
- MPS: White County MPS
- NRHP reference No.: 91001289
- Added to NRHP: September 5, 1991

The McAdams House is a historic house at Maple and South Streets in Pangburn, Arkansas. It is a single-story wood-frame structure, with a hip roof that has long and slightly flared eaves with exposed rafter tails. It is clad in novelty siding and rests on a foundation of stone piers. Built about 1915, it is one of the few well-preserved houses in White County from that time period.

The house was listed on the National Register of Historic Places in 1991.

== See also ==
- National Register of Historic Places listings in White County, Arkansas
