= Edgemont, Arkansas =

- Census-designated place
- Location within Arkansas Location within the United States
- Coordinates: 35°36′04″N 92°11′43″W
- Country: United States
- State: Arkansas
- County: Cleburne
- Elevation: 499 ft (152 m)

Population (2020)
  - Total: 56
- Time zone: UTC-6 (Central (CST))
  - Summer (DST): UTC-5 (CDT)
- ZIP code: 72044
- Area code: 501
- GNIS feature ID: 2805639

Edgemont is an unincorporated community and census-designated place (CDP) in Cleburne County, Arkansas, United States. Edgemont is located on the north side of Greers Ferry Lake along Arkansas Highway 16, 2 miles (3.2 km) northwest of Greers Ferry. Edgemont has a post office with ZIP code 72044.

It was first listed as a CDP in the 2020 census with a population of 56.

== Education ==
Public education for elementary and secondary students is provided by West Side School District, which operates West Side Elementary School and West Side High School located in Greers Ferry. The district encompasses more than 147.81 square miles (382.8 km^{2}) of land that includes all or portions of the following communities in Cleburne and Van Buren counties: Edgemont, Greers Ferry, Higden and Prim.

== Demographics ==
Historical population
Census	Pop.	Note	%±
2020	56		—
U.S. Decennial Census; 2020

=== 2020 census ===
Edgemont CDP, Arkansas – Racial and ethnic composition Note: the US Census treats Hispanic/Latino as an ethnic category. This table excludes Latinos from the racial categories and assigns them to a separate category. Hispanics/Latinos may be of any race.
Race / Ethnicity (NH = Non-Hispanic)	Pop 2020	% 2020
White alone (NH)	47	83.93%
Black or African American alone (NH)	2	3.57%
Native American or Alaska Native alone (NH)	2	3.57%
Asian alone (NH)	0	0.00%
Pacific Islander alone (NH)	1	1.79%
Some Other Race alone (NH)	0	0.00%
Mixed Race or Multi-Racial (NH)	2	3.57%
Hispanic or Latino (any race)	2	3.57%
Total	56	100.00%
