= Prim, Arkansas =

An unincorporated community in Cleburne County, Arkansas, United States

- Unincorporated community
- Motto: Home of the Round Rocks!
- Location within Arkansas Location within the United States
- Coordinates: 35°41′38″N 92°06′31″W
- Country: United States
- State: Arkansas
- County: Cleburne
- Elevation: 1,214 ft (370 m)
- Time zone: UTC-6 (Central (CST))
  - Summer (DST): UTC-5 (CDT)
- ZIP code: 72130
- Area code: 870
- GNIS feature ID: 53799

Prim is an unincorporated community in Cleburne County, Arkansas, United States. Prim is located at the junction of Arkansas Highway 225 and Arkansas Highway 263, 9 miles (14 km) north-northeast of Greers Ferry. Prim has a post office with ZIP code 72130.

The community has the name of one Mr. Prim, a pioneer citizen.

== Education ==
Public education for elementary and secondary students is provided by West Side School District, which operates West Side Elementary School and West Side High School located in Greers Ferry. The district encompasses more than 147.81 square miles (382.8 km^{2}) of land that includes all or portions of the following communities in Cleburne and Van Buren counties: Edgemont, Greers Ferry, Higden and Prim. There is also a private school, Hilltop Holiness Academy. This is owned and operated by Hilltop Holiness Church.
