= Arkansas Highway 336 (1965–2013) =

Former state highway in Arkansas, United States

Highway 336

Route information
- Maintained by AHTD
- Length: 5.8 mi (9.3 km)
- Existed: June 23, 1965–December 11, 2013

Major junctions
- West end: US 65 / AR 9
- East end: Greers Ferry Lake

Location
- Country: United States
- State: Arkansas

Highway system
- Arkansas Highway System; Interstate; US; State; Business; Spurs; Suffixed; Scenic; Heritage

Highway 336 (AR 336, Ark. 336, and Hwy. 336) is a former east–west state highway in Van Buren County, Arkansas. Between 1965 and 2013, the former county road carried a state highway designation and was maintained by the Arkansas State Highway and Transportation Department (AHTD).

== Route description ==
The designation followed a former county road, beginning at an intersection with US 65/Highway 9 south of Clinton and running east approximately 5.8 miles (9.3 km) through Green Tree to a cul-de-sac on a bluff above Greers Ferry Lake.

== History ==
Highway 336 was created along a county road by the Arkansas State Highway Commission on June 23, 1965. The highway was returned to local maintenance in December 2013. The Highway Commission used a policy that allows returning state highways to local control to offset the costs of non-reimbursable utility relocation where small water utilities do not have necessary funds to relocate their lines along important highway projects. Van Buren County assumed maintenance of Highway 336 (and a segment of Highway 330) following verification that the Bee Branch Water Association and Dennard Water Association would not be able to afford relocation of their water mains along US 65, which was widened under the Connecting Arkansas Program.

== Major intersections ==
The entire route was in Van Buren County.

Location	mi	km	Destinations	Notes
	0.0	0.0	US 65 / AR 9	Western terminus
	5.8	9.3	End state maintenance	Eastern terminus
1.000 mi = 1.609 km; 1.000 km = 0.621 mi
