= Avanell Wright House =

Historic house in Arkansas, United States

- U.S. National Register of Historic Places
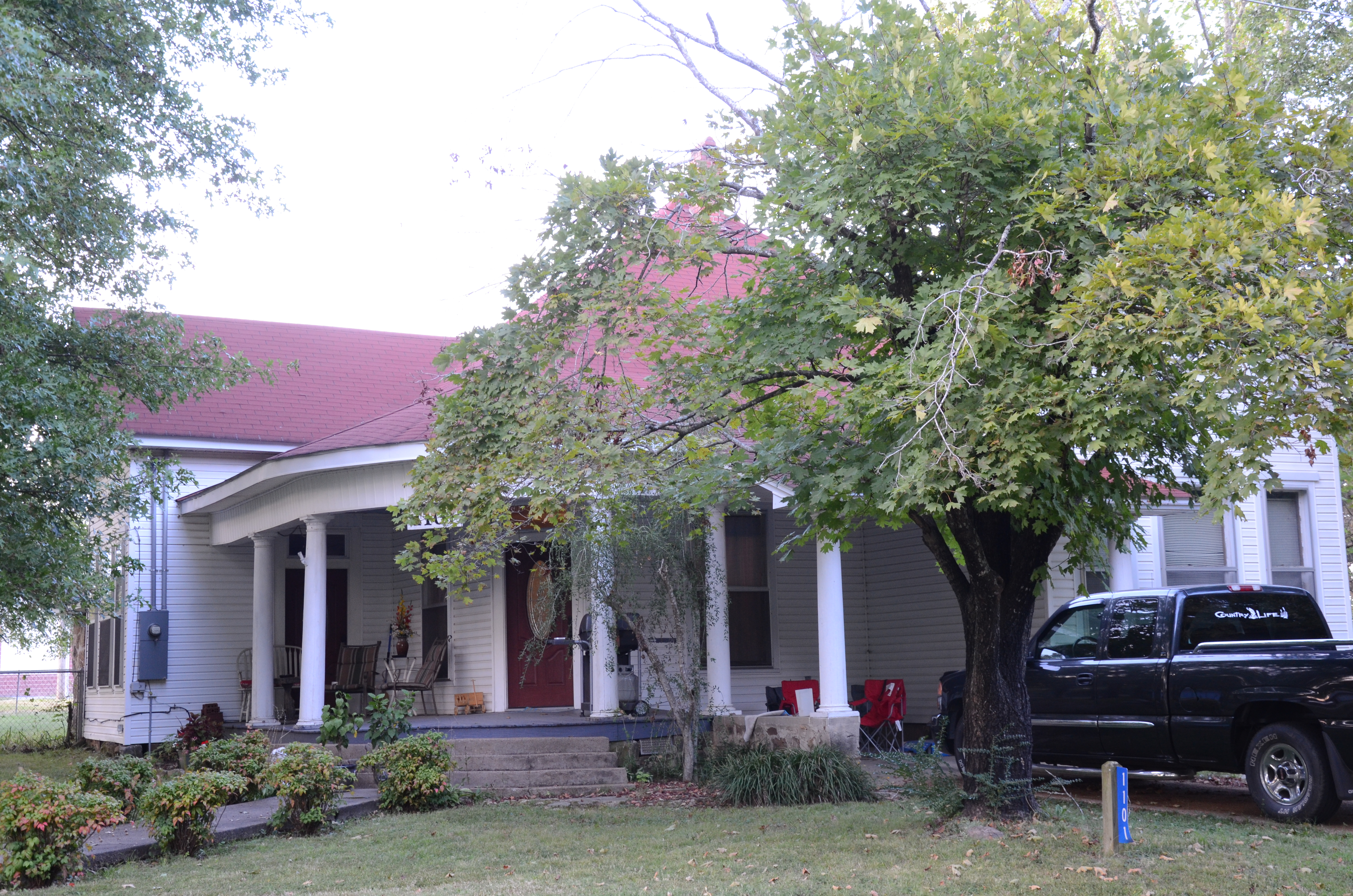

- Location within Arkansas Location within the United States
- Location: Jct. of Main and Pine Sts., Pangburn, Arkansas
- Coordinates: 35°25′38″N 91°50′7″W
- Area: less than one acre
- Built: 1910
- Architectural style: Vernacular irregular plan
- MPS: White County MPS
- NRHP reference No.: 91001291
- Added to NRHP: September 5, 1991

The Avanell Wright House is a historic house at Main and Pine Streets in Pangburn, Arkansas. It is a single story L-shaped wood-frame structure, with a stone foundation, novelty siding, and a cross-gable roof that has a central pyramidal section. The roof line of the central section extends downward over a porch located in the crook of the L, with Tuscan columns for support. The house was built about 1910, and is one of relatively few surviving houses from that period in the community.

The house was listed on the National Register of Historic Places in 1991.

== See also ==
- National Register of Historic Places listings in White County, Arkansas
