= Shirley School District =

School district in Arkansas, United States

Location
- 199 School Drive; Shirley, Arkansas 72153 United States

District information
- Grades: K–12
- Schools: 2
- NCES District ID: 0512420

Students and staff
- Students: 383
- Teachers: 39.59 (on FTE basis)
- Student–teacher ratio: 9.67
- Athletic conference: 1A Region 5 West (as of 2018)
- Colors: Blue White; Silver

Other information
- Website: shirleybluedevils.org

Shirley School District is a school district based in Shirley, Arkansas. The school district supports all of Shirley and portions of Fairfield Bay in northeastern Van Buren County and a minor portion of southwestern Stone County along Arkansas Highway 110.

== Schools ==
- Shirley Elementary School, serving kindergarten through grade 6.
- Shirley High School, serving grades 7 through 12.
