= Shirley High School (Arkansas) =

Location
- 201 Blue Devil Drive; Shirley, Arkansas 72153; United States; 35°39′34″N 92°18′46″W

Information
- School type: Public comprehensive
- Status: Open
- School district: Shirley School District
- CEEB code: 040340
- NCES School ID: 050849000566
- Teaching staff: 12.58 (on FTE basis)
- Grades: 7–12
- Enrollment: 134 (2023-2024)
- Student to teacher ratio: 10.65
- Education system: ADE Smart Core
- Classes offered: Regular, Advanced Placement (AP)
- Colors: Blue and white
- Athletics: Golf, basketball, baseball, softball, tennis, track
- Athletics conference: 1A 7 West
- Mascot: Blue Devil
- Team name: Shirley Blue Devils
- Accreditation: ADE
- Federal funding: Title I
- Website: www.shirleybluedevils.org/page/high-school

Shirley High School is an accredited public high school located in the rural community of Shirley, Arkansas, United States. The school provides comprehensive secondary education for more than 200 students each year in grades 7 through 12. It is one of three public high schools in Van Buren County, Arkansas and the only high school administered by the Shirley School District.

== Academics ==
Shirley High School is accredited by the Arkansas Department of Education (ADE). The assumed course of study follows the Smart Core curriculum developed by the ADE. Students complete regular (core and elective) and career focus coursework and exams and may take Advanced Placement (AP) courses and exams with the opportunity to receive college credit. Shirley is a member of the Dawson Education Service Cooperative, which provides career and technical education programs for the area's high school students in multiple school districts.

== Athletics ==
The Shirley High School mascot and athletic emblem are the Blue Devils with blue and white serving as the school colors.

For 2012–14, the Shirley Blue Devils compete in interscholastic activities within the 1A Classification from the 1A 7 West Conference as administered by the Arkansas Activities Association. The Blue Devils participate in golf (boys/girls), basketball (boys/girls), baseball, softball, tennis (boys/girls), and track (boys/girls).
