= Shirley, Arkansas =

- Town
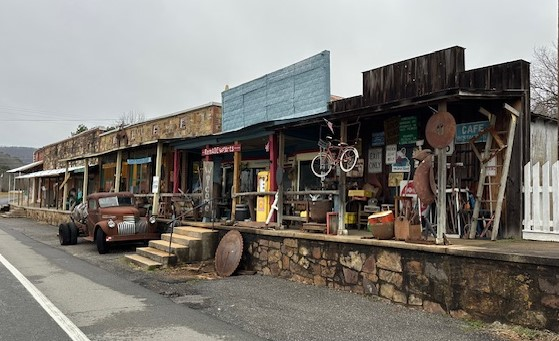
- Downtown Shirley, February 2025

- Location of Shirley in Van Buren County, Arkansas.
- Coordinates: 35°38′39″N 92°18′50″W
- Country: United States
- State: Arkansas
- County: Van Buren

Area
  - Total: 2.47 sq mi (6.40 km^{2})
  - Land: 2.41 sq mi (6.23 km^{2})
  - Water: 0.062 sq mi (0.16 km^{2})
- Elevation: 538 ft (164 m)

Population (2020)
  - Total: 248
  - Estimate (2025): 249 ▲
  - Density: 103.0/sq mi (39.78/km^{2})
- Time zone: UTC-6 (Central (CST))
  - Summer (DST): UTC-5 (CDT)
- ZIP codes: 72088, 72153
- Area code: 501
- FIPS code: 05-63980
- GNIS feature ID: 2407328
- Website: shirleyarkansas.us

Shirley is a town in northeast Van Buren County, Arkansas, United States, along the Middle Fork of the Little Red River. It is located on Arkansas State Highway 9 about 11 miles northeast of Clinton, Arkansas. A one-time railroad outpost, the community today is oriented toward agriculture and recreational activities due to the river and Greers Ferry Lake. The population was 248 as of the 2020 Census.

== Geography ==
According to the United States Census Bureau, the town has a total area of 2.5 square miles (6.5 km^{2}), of which 2.4 square miles (6.2 km^{2}) is land and 0.1 square miles (0.26 km^{2}) (2.85%) is water.

== Demographics ==
Historical population
Census	Pop.	Note	%±
1920	349		—
1930	292		−16.3%
1940	365		25.0%
1950	259		−29.0%
1960	197		−23.9%
1970	269		36.5%
1980	354		31.6%
1990	363		2.5%
2000	337		−7.2%
2010	291		−13.6%
2020	248		−14.8%
2025 (est.)	249	▲	0.4%
U.S. Decennial Census

As of the census of 2010, there were 223 people, 136 households, and 91 families residing in the town. The population density was 140.9 inhabitants per square mile (54.4/km^{2}). There were 132 housing units at an average density of 71.9 per square mile (27.8/km^{2}). The racial makeup of the town was 96.14% White, 0.89% Black or African American, 1.89% Native American, and 2.08% from two or more races. 1.19% of the population were Hispanic or Latino of any race.

There were 132 households, out of which 33.1% had children under the age of 18 living with them, 58.8% were married couples living together, 6.6% had a female householder with no husband present, and 32.4% were non-families. 29.4% of all households were made up of individuals, and 14.7% had someone living alone who was 65 years of age or older. The average household size was 2.48 and the average family size was 3.08.

In the town, the population was spread out, with 27.0% under the age of 18, 7.7% from 18 to 24, 27.6% from 25 to 44, 19.0% from 45 to 64, and 18.7% who were 65 years of age or older. The median age was 35 years. For every 100 females, there were 89.3 males. For every 100 females age 18 and over, there were 92.2 males.

The median income for a household in the town was $23,958, and the median income for a family was $30,938. Males had a median income of $21,875 versus $14,545 for females. The per capita income for the town was $10,096. About 14.1% of families and 23.2% of the population were below the poverty line, including 34.2% of those under age 18 and 11.1% of those age 65 or over.

== Education ==
Public education for elementary and secondary students is provided by Shirley School District, which includes Shirley Elementary School and Shirley High School.
