= Greers Ferry Dam =

- Greers Ferry Dam in Cleburne County, Arkansas

- Location within Arkansas
- Country: United States
- Location: Cleburne County, Arkansas
- Coordinates: 35°31′15″N 91°59′36″W
- Status: Operational
- Construction began: 1959
- Opening date: 1962
- Construction cost: $46.5 million
- Owner: United States Army Corps of Engineers
- Operator: United States Army Corps of Engineers

Dam and spillways
- Impounds: Little Red River
- Height: 243 feet (74 m)
- Length: 1,704 feet (519 m)

Reservoir
- Creates: Greers Ferry Lake
- Total capacity: 2,844,000 acre⋅ft (3.508 km^{3})
- Surface area: 31,500 acres (12,700 ha)
- Normal elevation: 462 feet (141 m)

Power Station
- Commission date: 1964
- Type: Conventional
- Turbines: 2
- Installed capacity: 96 megawatts (129,000 hp)
- Annual generation: 189 gigawatt-hours (6.4×10^{11} BTU)

Greers Ferry Dam is located on the Little Red River in Cleburne County in the U.S. state of Arkansas. It impounds Greers Ferry Lake. The dam is located north of Little Rock.

== Building the dam ==
Greers Ferry Dam

Construction of the dam began in March 1959 and was completed in December 1962. The lake serves the Heber Springs area flood control, and is a site for recreation and power generation. When construction began on the dam in 1956, hundreds of workers showed up looking for work. The newly hired workers then rented empty houses next to the construction site, and workers were even building their own homes next to the soon-to-be lake. Once all the workers arrived, people and business owners saw an opportunity in this construction and built motels, shops, and stores next to the construction site so workers would have a place to shop and relax. Farmers also felt the benefit of the construction, as work on the lake created demand for livestock and agriculture.

== Dedication ==
After completion, the lake was dedicated on October 3, 1963 by John F. Kennedy. The trip was his last major public appearance before his fateful trip to Dallas on Nov. 22, 1963, where he was assassinated. This event marks the only time a sitting president has visited Cleburne County. In his remarks in Heber Springs, Kennedy explained that the Greers Ferry project and others like it were investments in Arkansas and the nation's future. He was right - after the lake filled, tourism boomed, many businesses opened and reopened, and Greers Ferry Lake became one of Arkansas' leading destinations. Today, many resort communities dot the shores of Greers Ferry Lake.

== Power plant ==
The dam supports a power plant with two generating units rated at 48,000 kilowatts per unit.

== See also ==
- List of Arkansas dams and reservoirs
