= Greers Ferry, Arkansas =

- City
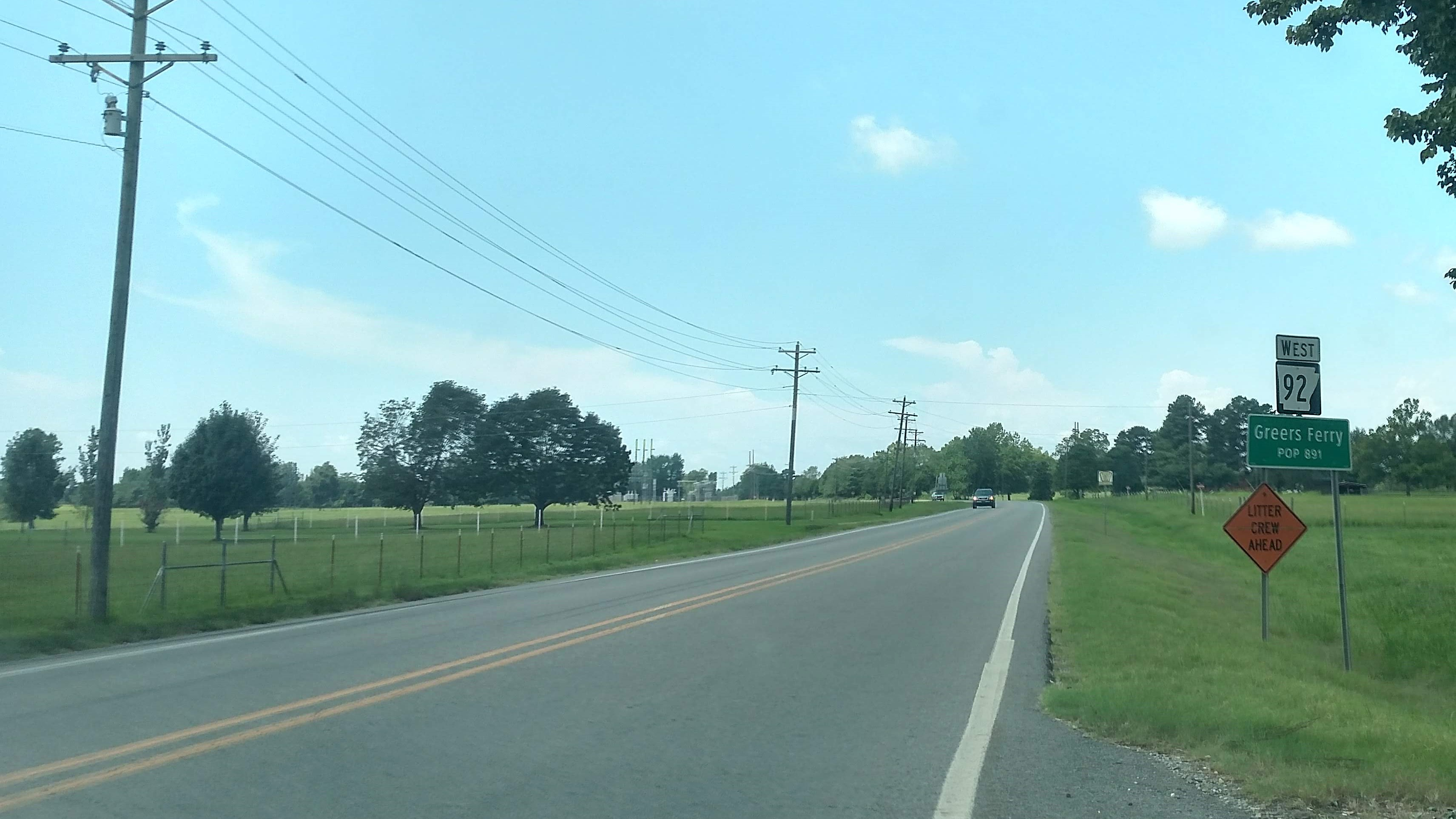
- Entrance sign for Greers Ferry

- Location of Greers Ferry in Cleburne County, Arkansas.
- Coordinates: 35°34′03″N 92°10′08″W
- Country: United States
- State: Arkansas
- County: Cleburne

Area
  - Total: 7.23 sq mi (18.72 km^{2})
  - Land: 7.22 sq mi (18.69 km^{2})
  - Water: 0.012 sq mi (0.03 km^{2})
- Elevation: 545 ft (166 m)

Population (2020)
  - Total: 821
  - Estimate (2025): 831 ▲
  - Density: 113.8/sq mi (43.92/km^{2})
- Time zone: UTC-6 (Central (CST))
  - Summer (DST): UTC-5 (CDT)
- ZIP code: 72067
- Area code: 501
- FIPS code: 05-28810
- GNIS feature ID: 2403759

Greers Ferry is a city in Cleburne County, Arkansas, United States. It was founded in 1968. The population was 821 as of the 2020 Census.

== History ==
In 1971, The Group, Inc. attempted to establish an intentional community in Greers Ferry after relocating from earlier communal ventures elsewhere in the state. The Group originated from the Dan Blocker Singers, a Los Angeles-based musical group led by Dixon Bowles, and adopted a highly disciplined communal model that prohibited drugs and free love, required the pooling of all income, and demanded long working hours from its members. Far from withdrawing from local society, the Group embedded itself deeply in the town's economic and civic life. By 1972, it owned or operated several businesses, including a dinner theatre, construction company, bakery, butcher shop, and weekly newspaper, and its members staffed the entire volunteer fire department, participated in churches, and led Scout troops.

Despite this conformity, suspicion and resentment persisted among sections of the local population, driven less by the Group's behaviour than by hostility toward communal organisation and outsiders. Tensions escalated after the Group voted as a bloc in a local election in 1972, influencing the outcome and provoking retaliation from the losing faction. From 1972 to 1973, members reported sustained harassment, including threats, vandalism, and the circulation of false rumours portraying the Group as immoral, subversive, or intent on taking over the town. Hostility culminated on 23 August 1973, when a mob attacked the Group's communal residence, throwing stones and firing gunshots, causing extensive damage. The attack followed earlier acts of intimidation by the locals. State police later charged 23 individuals with "felony night riding", though members of the Group expressed little confidence that local juries would hold the perpetrators accountable.

These events followed earlier tragedies, including the destruction by fire of a lodge operated by the Group on 3 February 1971 and the deaths of five members in a car accident on 5 February 1971, which had already weakened the community financially and emotionally. By 1974, continued hostility, social exclusion, and the failure of local authorities to provide a secure environment made it untenable for the Group to remain in Greers Ferry. The community relocated to Little Rock, bringing its attempt to sustain a commune in Greers Ferry to an end.

== Geography ==
Greers Ferry is located in western Cleburne County at 35°34′32″N 92°9′51″W (35.575588, -92.164042). It is situated on the east side of Greers Ferry Lake, overlooking The Narrows portion of the lake. Arkansas Highways 16 and 92 cross The Narrows, connecting the city of Greers Ferry with Higden on the west side of the lake. Highway 16, heading north, crosses the northern arm of the lake via the Edgemont Bridge, leading to Fairfield Bay.

According to the United States Census Bureau, Greers Ferry has a total area of 7.2 square miles (18.7 km^{2}), of which 0.012 square miles (0.03 km^{2}), or 0.14%, is water.

== Demographics ==
Historical population
Census	Pop.	Note	%±
1970	389		—
1980	558		43.4%
1990	724		29.7%
2000	930		28.5%
2010	891		−4.2%
2020	821		−7.9%
2025 (est.)	831	▲	1.2%
U.S. Decennial Census

=== 2020 census ===
Greers Ferry racial composition
Race	Number	Percentage
White (non-Hispanic)	761	92.69%
Black or African American (non-Hispanic)	5	0.61%
Native American	6	0.73%
Asian	1	0.12%
Other/Mixed	30	3.65%
Hispanic or Latino	18	2.19%

As of the 2020 United States census, there were 821 people, 451 households, and 330 families residing in the city.

=== 2000 census ===
As of the census of 2000, there were 930 people, 398 households, and 300 families residing in the city. The population density was 130.5 inhabitants per square mile (50.4/km^{2}). There were 664 housing units at an average density of 93.1 per square mile (35.9/km^{2}). The racial makeup of the city was 97.31% White, 0.11% Black or African American, 0.11% Native American, 0.22% Asian, 0.22% from other races, and 2.04% from two or more races. 1.18% of the population were Hispanic or Latino of any race.

There were 398 households, out of which 24.6% had children under the age of 18 living with them, 65.3% were married couples living together, 7.0% had a female householder with no husband present, and 24.4% were non-families. 21.1% of all households were made up of individuals, and 11.6% had someone living alone who was 65 years of age or older. The average household size was 2.34 and the average family size was 2.65.

In the city, the population was spread out, with 20.3% under the age of 18, 5.1% from 18 to 24, 21.3% from 25 to 44, 26.6% from 45 to 64, and 26.8% who were 65 years of age or older. The median age was 48 years. For every 100 females, there were 99.6 males. For every 100 females age 18 and over, there were 96.0 males.

The median income for a household in the city was $30,238, and the median income for a family was $32,344. Males had a median income of $24,200 versus $16,250 for females. The per capita income for the city was $16,496. About 12.0% of families and 16.0% of the population were below the poverty line, including 26.4% of those under age 18 and 8.2% of those age 65 or over.

== Education ==
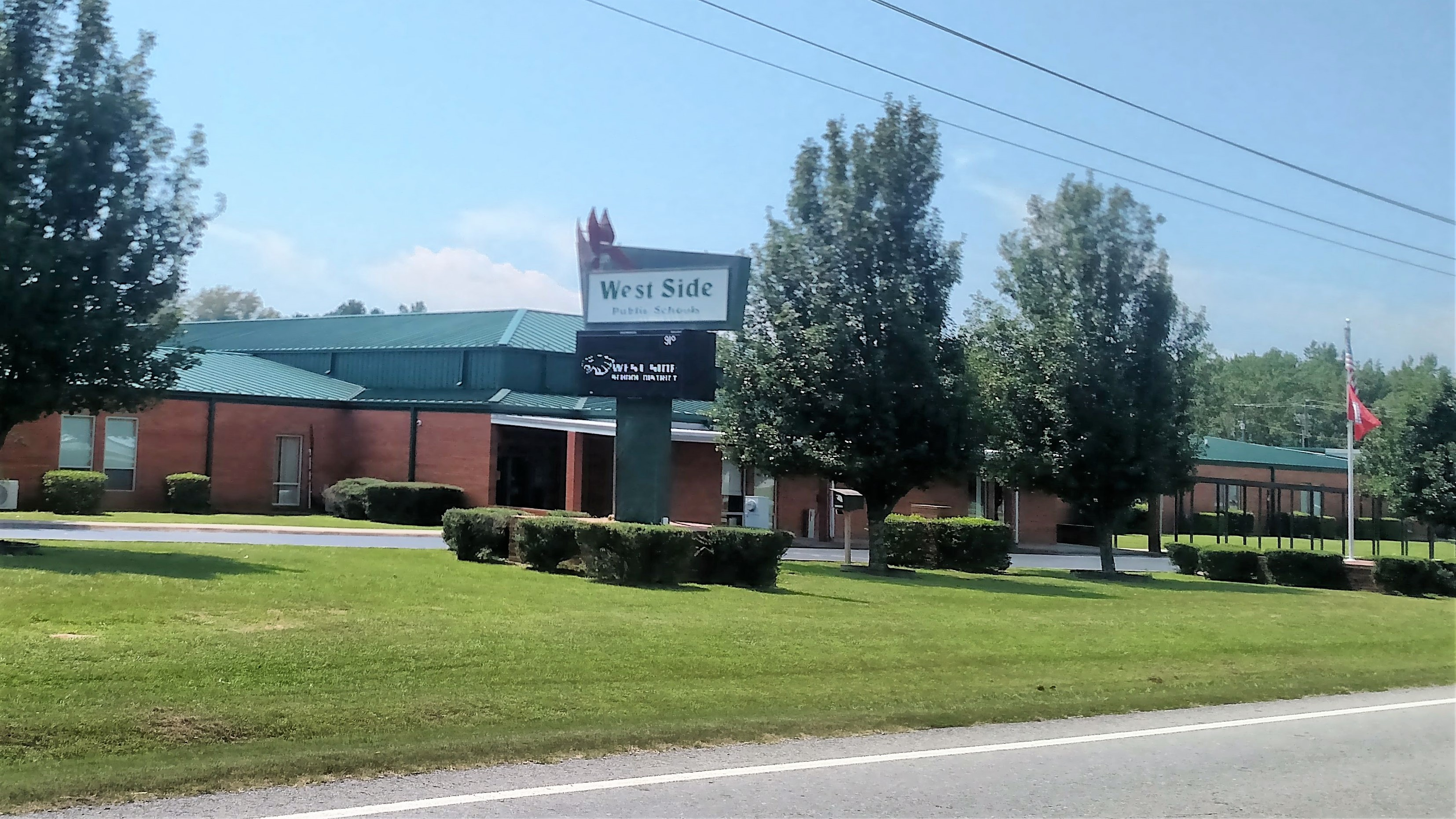
West Side High School in Greers Ferry

Greers Ferry is home to the West Side School District, West Side Elementary School and West Side High School. The district encompasses more than 147.81 square miles (382.8 km^{2}) of land that includes all or portions of the following communities in Cleburne and Van Buren counties: Edgemont, Greers Ferry, Higden and Prim.
