= Westside High School =

Westside High School or West Side High School is the name of several high schools, and can refer to:

- Westside High School (Craighead County, Arkansas) - near Jonesboro
- Westside High School (Augusta, Georgia)
- Westside High School (Houston), Texas
- Westside High School (Jacksonville), formerly Nathan Bedford Forrest High School, renamed in 2014
- Westside High School (Macon, Georgia)
- Westside High School (Omaha), Nebraska
- Westside High School (South Carolina) in Anderson, South Carolina
- Westside High School (West Virginia) in Clear Fork, West Virginia
- West Side High School (Dayton, Idaho)
- West Side High School (Greers Ferry, Arkansas)
- Edmondson-Westside High School in Baltimore, Maryland
- West Side High School (Gary), Indiana
- West Side High School (New Bedford), an alternative junior-senior high school in New Bedford, Massachusetts
- West Side High School (New Jersey) in Newark, New Jersey
- West Lafayette Junior-Senior High School, Indiana
