= Fairfield Bay, Arkansas =

- City
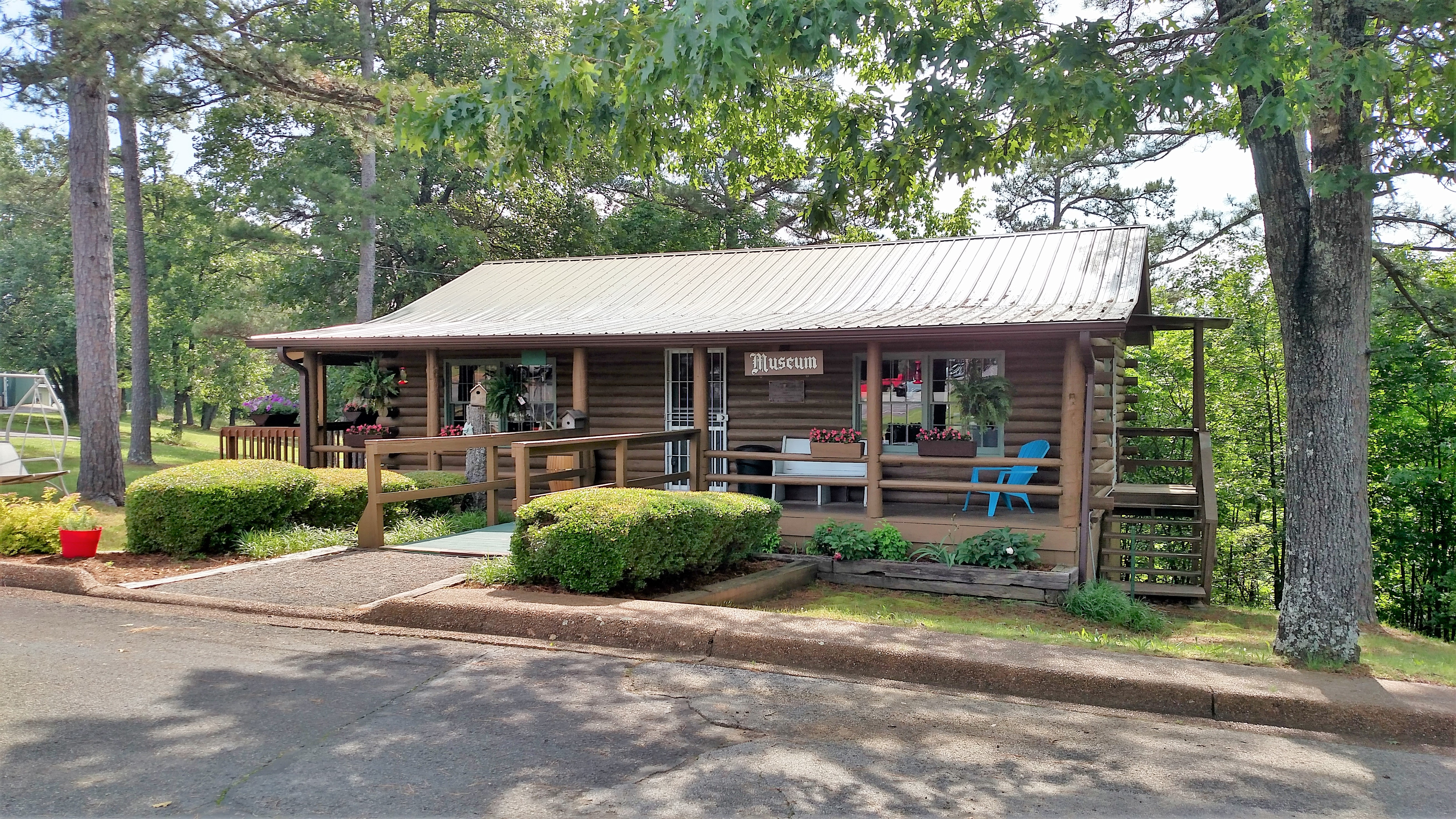
- Fairfield Bay Museum

- Location of Fairfield Bay in Cleburne County and Van Buren County, Arkansas.
- Coordinates: 35°36′18″N 92°15′57″W
- Country: United States
- State: Arkansas
- Counties: Van Buren, Cleburne

Area
  - Total: 15.16 sq mi (39.26 km^{2})
  - Land: 15.10 sq mi (39.10 km^{2})
  - Water: 0.062 sq mi (0.16 km^{2})
- Elevation: 932 ft (284 m)

Population (2020)
  - Total: 2,108
  - Estimate (2025): 2,198 ▲
  - Density: 139.6/sq mi (53.91/km^{2})
- Time zone: UTC-6 (Central (CST))
  - Summer (DST): UTC-5 (CDT)
- ZIP code: 72088
- Area code: 501
- FIPS code: 05-22660
- GNIS feature ID: 2403589
- Website: www.fairfieldbayar.com

Fairfield Bay is a city in Cleburne and Van Buren counties in the northern part of the U.S. state of Arkansas. The population was 2,108 at the 2020 census. The population in its portion in Van Buren County, which accounts for the bulk of the city limits, made the city the most populous in Van Buren County as of the 2000 census, but with a slight decline in population, lost the distinction to Clinton as of 2010.

Fairfield Bay, located on the shore of Greers Ferry Lake, is home to Fairfield Bay Resort, the namesake of Wyndham Worldwide-owned Fairfield Resorts.

== Geography ==
Fairfield Bay is located in eastern Van Buren County at 35°36′07″N 92°15′51″W, extending eastward into Cleburne County. It is located on hills overlooking the northern shore of Greers Ferry Lake, a reservoir on the Little Red River, a tributary of the White River which flows to the Mississippi.

According to the United States Census Bureau, the city has a total area of 15.3 square miles (39.7 km^{2}), of which 15.3 square miles (39.5 km^{2}) is land and 0.04 square miles (0.1 km^{2}), or 0.36%, is water.

== Demographics ==
Historical population
Census	Pop.	Note	%±
2000	2,460		—
2010	2,338		−5.0%
2020	2,108		−9.8%
2025 (est.)	2,198	▲	4.3%
U.S. Decennial Census; 2014 Estimate

=== 2020 census ===
As of the 2020 census, Fairfield Bay had a population of 2,108 and 626 families. The median age was 65.4 years. 10.2% of residents were under the age of 18 and 50.5% of residents were 65 years of age or older. For every 100 females, there were 88.9 males, and for every 100 females age 18 and over there were 90.4 males age 18 and over.

0.0% of residents lived in urban areas, while 100.0% lived in rural areas.

There were 1,131 households in Fairfield Bay, of which 12.6% had children under the age of 18 living in them. Of all households, 48.0% were married-couple households, 19.7% were households with a male householder and no spouse or partner present, and 29.4% were households with a female householder and no spouse or partner present. About 38.3% of all households were made up of individuals and 27.0% had someone living alone who was 65 years of age or older.

There were 1,828 housing units, of which 38.1% were vacant. The homeowner vacancy rate was 6.5% and the rental vacancy rate was 17.0%.

Fairfield Bay racial composition
Race	Number	Percentage
White (non-Hispanic)	1,958	92.88%
Black or African American (non-Hispanic)	13	0.62%
Native American	14	0.66%
Asian	13	0.62%
Other/Mixed	67	3.18%
Hispanic or Latino	43	2.04%

=== 2000 census ===
As of the census of 2000, there were 2,460 people, 1,231 households, and 833 families residing in the city. The population density was 162.1 inhabitants per square mile (62.6/km^{2}). There were 1,976 housing units at an average density of 130.2 per square mile (50.3/km^{2}). The racial makeup of the city was 98.41% White, 0.53% Black or African American, 0.16% Native American, 0.24% Asian, and 0.65% from two or more races. 0.53% of the population were Hispanic or Latino of any race.

There were 1,231 households, out of which 8.9% had children under the age of 18 living with them, 62.0% were married couples living together, 4.3% had a female householder with no husband present, and 32.3% were non-families. 29.7% of all households were made up of individuals, and 21.9% had someone living alone who was 65 years of age or older. The average household size was 1.91 and the average family size was 2.29.

In the city, the population was spread out, with 9.3% under the age of 18, 2.6% from 18 to 24, 10.2% from 25 to 44, 25.3% from 45 to 64, and 52.6% who were 65 years of age or older. The median age was 66 years. For every 100 females, there were 82.4 males. For every 100 females age 18 and over, there were 82.0 males.

The median income for a household in the city was $35,089, and the median income for a family was $42,419. Males had a median income of $30,337 versus $21,625 for females. The per capita income for the city was $24,900. About 4.8% of families and 7.1% of the population were below the poverty line, including 20.1% of those under age 18 and 3.4% of those age 65 or over.

== Education ==
Public education for elementary and secondary students is provided by the Shirley School District in Van Buren County and by the West Side School District for Cleburne County.
