= Pangburn School District =

School district in Arkansas

Pangburn Public School District
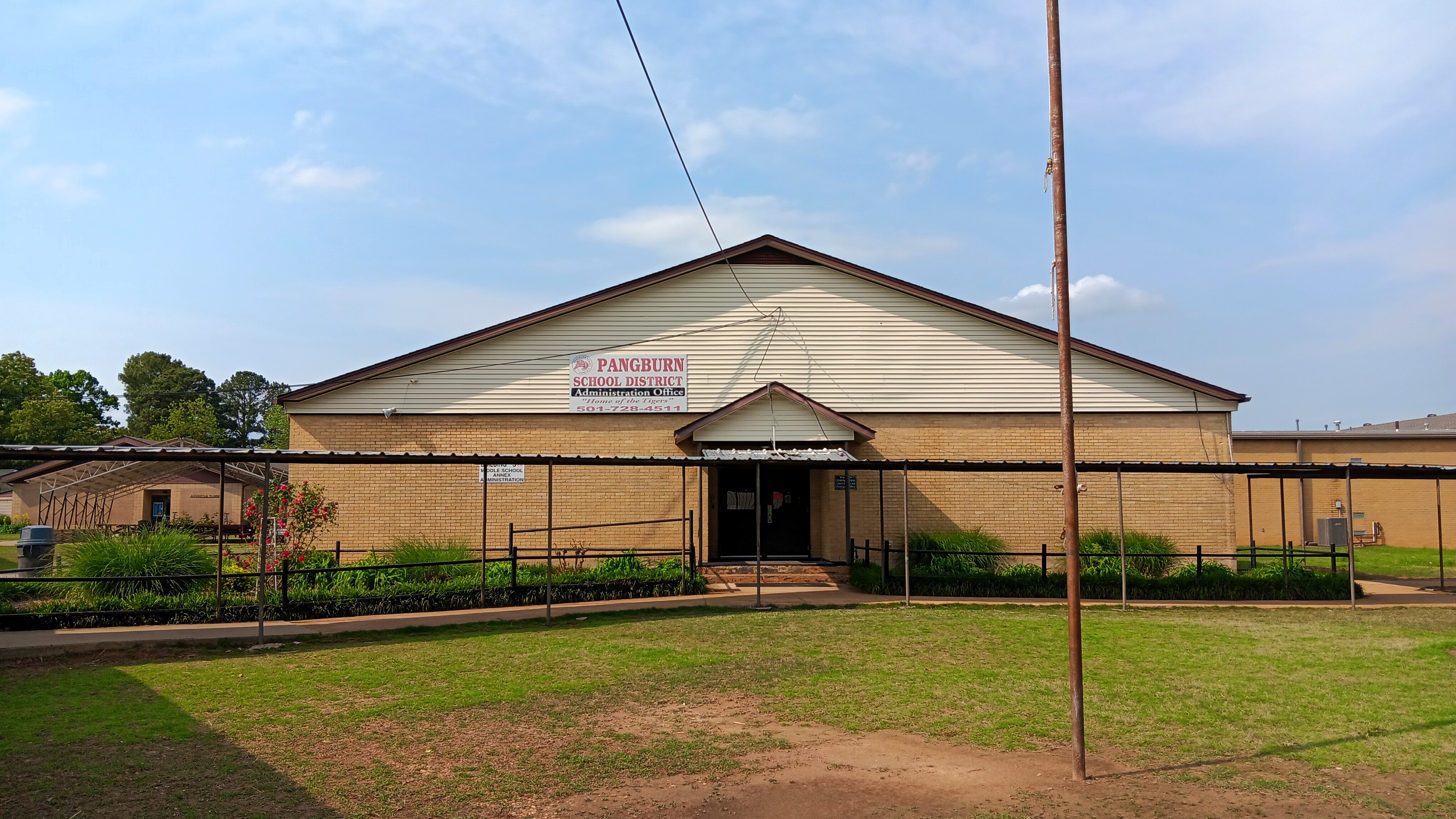

Address
- 1100 Short St; Pangburn, Arkansas 72121 White County, Arkansas United States
- Coordinates: 35°25′45″N 91°50′10″W

District information
- Type: Public
- Grades: K-12
- Superintendent: David Rolland
- Schools: 3

Students and staff
- Athletic conference: Class 3A
- District mascot: Tigers
- Colors: Red; White

Other information
- Website: pangburnschools.org

Pangburn School District is a small school district based in rural north-central White County, Arkansas, United States, with portions in southeastern Cleburne County. Enrollment is less than 1,000 students. The school serves students in Pangburn and the surrounding area. The district is currently separated into four schools: preschool, elementary (kindergarten through fourth grade), middle school (grades five through eight), and high school (grades nine through twelve). All schools are located on the same campus, located in the town of Pangburn.

The district's mission statement is "All students are expected to learn, create, achieve, and succeed in education, community, and life. As educators, we should strive to motivate, encourage, and inspire young people to overcome obstacles and achieve lifelong goals."

== Elementary school ==
The Pangburn Elementary School consists of students from kindergarten to fourth grade with at least three classes per grade.

The elementary school's principal is Mary Rieck.

Elementary students take part in science labs, gifted and talented programs, music classes, art classes, and physical education classes. They have access to books and other resources contained within the Elementary Media Center.

== Middle school ==
The Pangburn Middle School is made up of students in grades five through eight. At this level, students begin switching classrooms for different subjects. Grades five and six have language arts classes in their homeroom, then switch to other teachers for history, science, and mathematics classes. Grades seven and eight have a modified form of the high school class changing, with no homerooms and specialized classrooms.

The middle school principal is Suzanne Louks. Classes are held in the newly constructed middle school building. Construction was completed on the facility in the summer of 2009, with students moving into the facility for the 2010 school year.

Students in middle school may participate in basketball, baseball, softball, and cheerleading at either the middle school or junior high level. Middle schoolers also have the opportunity to perform as part of both the band and the choir. Many clubs, such as FCA and the junior level of Beta Club. The middle school is the only school in the district to have an archery team.

== High school ==
The high school serves students in grades nine through twelve.
Principal of the high school is Terri Kane.

Students at Pangburn High School have the opportunity to take a wide variety of courses. The high school offers courses in English, science, mathematics, history, art, music, Spanish, drama and oral communications, business, law, sociology, family and consumer sciences and agriculture. In addition, many courses are offered via the school's two distance learning labs. The distance learning courses include many AP courses, as well as specialized courses in medicine and other fields. In addition, the school works with ASU-Heber Springs to allow students to take concurrent mechanical classes at the college and concurrent college classes. Most classes are held in the newly constructed high school surrounding the arena. Construction on phase one, including classrooms for family and consumer sciences, art, and science, as well as an arena was completed in early 2011. Classes and basketball games were held in the building beginning in school year 2012. Phase two, including classrooms for most other disciplines, was completed in the summer of 2013. The completed building began hosting students in school year 2014.

=== Clubs at Pangburn High School ===
- Bible Club
- Chess Club
- FCCLA
- FCA
- FBLA
- FFA
- National Beta Club
- Quiz Bowl
- Spanish Club
- Student Council

The Pangburn High School quiz bowl team often competes on the state level, enjoying a moderate success on the regional level.

The National Beta Club has had successes at the state level and the national level several times. Students compete in academic, art, talent, robotics, technology, and community service events.

Pangburn's FCA chapter is one of the most active chapters in the area. Holding events such as 5th Quarter, Ultimate Weekend, Character Camp, and Huddle Time, their focus is to bring glory to God.

FBLA enjoys tremendous success on the state level, often competing on the national level. The FBLA community service team is often ranked among the top ten in the nation, even bringing home the national title at least once.
FBLA's projects have included building a house with Habitat for Humanity, establishing a museum detailing the history of Pangburn, and building a veterans' memorial, among many others.

=== Pangburn High School Band ===
The Pangburn High School Band is consistently rated among the top small school bands in the state of Arkansas. Under the direction of Bill Mitchell, the band has been invited to perform at locations throughout the United States.

In 2006, the Pangburn School Band was invited as one of two school bands to represent the state of Arkansas at the National Anthem Project in Washington, D.C. The band performed a short concert in front of the U.S. Capitol building. Later, the band performed as part of a mass choir for the opening ceremony of DCI at Navy-Marine Corps Memorial Stadium in Annapolis, Maryland.

In 2009, the Band performed a short concert at a venue in Universal City Walk at Universal Studios in Orlando, Florida and later at Kennedy Space Center in Merritt Island, Florida.

=== Athletics ===
Pangburn High School fields teams in the following sports:

- Boys' basketball
- Girls' basketball
- Baseball
- Softball
- Cross country
- Shooting sports
- Cheer

Basketball is the most attended sporting event at Pangburn. In recent years, both basketball teams have enjoyed success on the district level and moderate success on the regional level. The softball team also is competitive at a district, and in recent years, state level.

Cross country and golf are sports that only appear when enough students express an interest. Both teams compete in various meets and tournaments across the area.

Shooting sports also enjoys success at a regional level, advancing to state almost every year since the team's creation. This team is not affiliated with the Arkansas Athletics Association, instead being affiliated with the Arkansas Game and Fish Commission.
