= West Side School District =

School district in Arkansas, United States

Location
- 7295 Greers Ferry Road; Greers Ferry, Arkansas 72067 United States

District information
- Grades: PK–12
- Accreditation: Arkansas Department of Education
- Schools: 2
- NCES District ID: 0514040

Students and staff
- Students: 502 (2021-2022)
- Teachers: 52.02 (on FTE basis)(2021-2022)
- Student–teacher ratio: 9.65 (2021-2022)
- Athletic conference: 1A 2 South (2012–14)
- District mascot: Eagle
- Colors: Green; White

Other information
- Website: www.westsideeagles.org

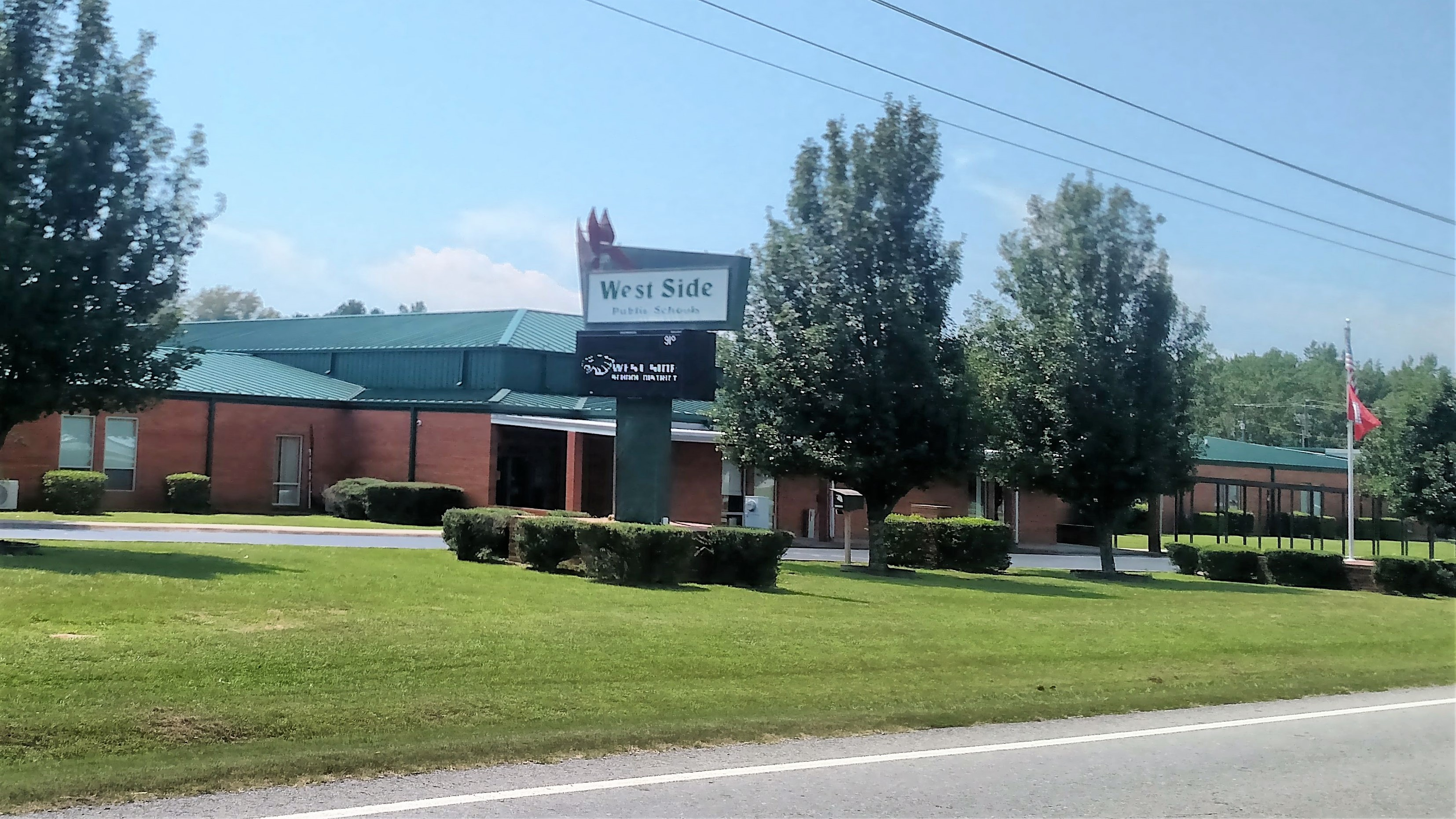
West Side High School

West Side School District (or West Side Public Schools) is a public school district based in Greers Ferry, Arkansas, United States. It provides early childhood, elementary and secondary education for more than 500 prekindergarten through grade 12 students at its two facilities in Cleburne County. The district is accredited by the Arkansas Department of Education (ADE).

The district encompasses more than 147.81 square miles (382.8 km^{2}) of land that includes all or portions of Cleburne County and Van Buren County communities, including: Greers Ferry, Higden, and the Cleburne County portion of Fairfield Bay. It also includes Prim and Edgemont.

In 2012, the high school was nationally recognized as a bronze medalist in the Best High Schools Report 2012 developed by U.S. News & World Report.

== Schools ==
- West Side High School, serving approximately 250 students in grades 7 through 12.
- West Side Elementary School, serving approximately 250 students in kindergarten through grade 6.
