= Little Red River (Arkansas) =

River in Arkansas, United States

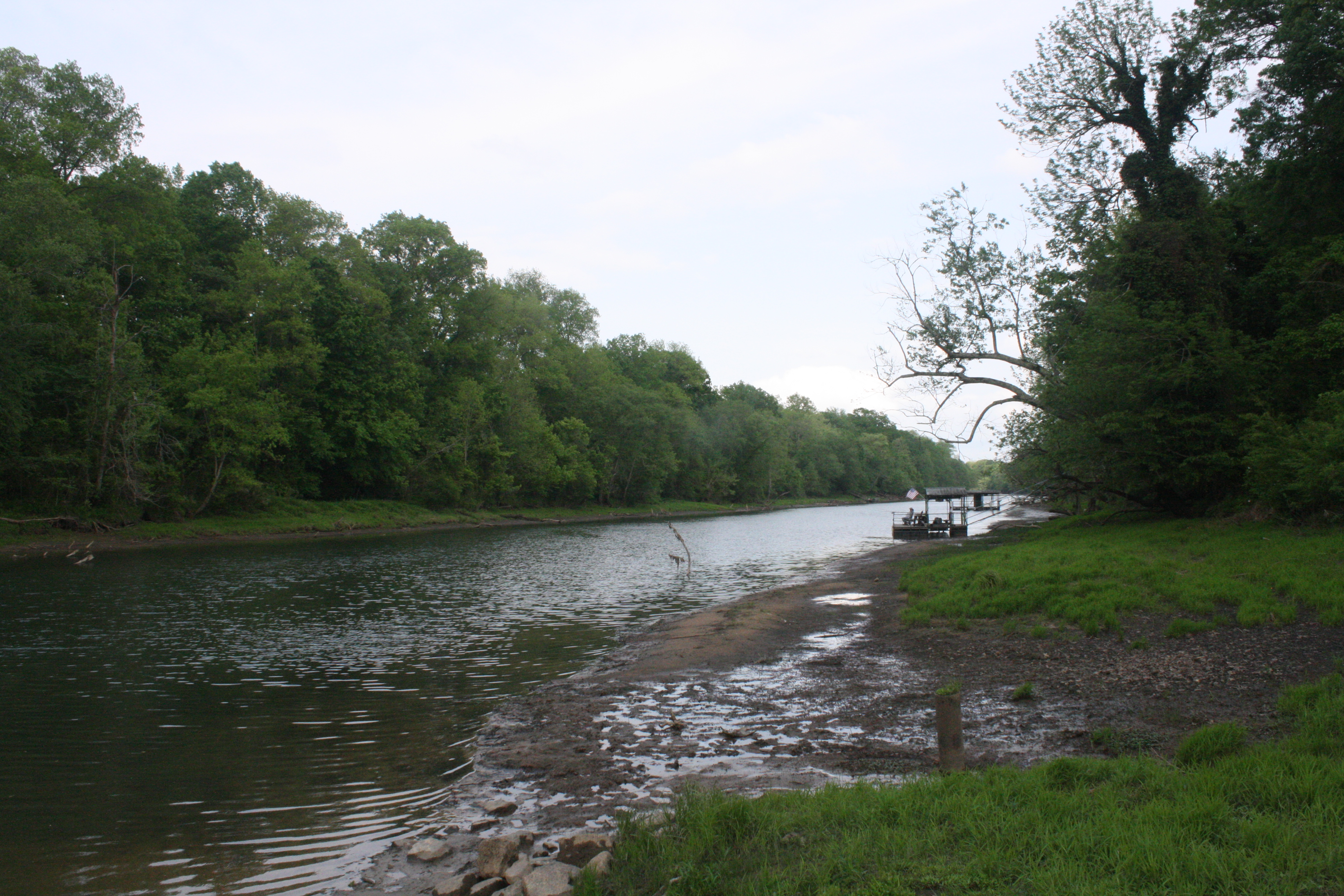
Little Red River at Lobo Access (looking upstream)

The Little Red River is a 102-mile-long (164 km) river in White, Van Buren, Searcy, Stone and Cleburne counties of north-central Arkansas.

== History ==
During the American Civil War, the Battle of Whitney's Lane took place near Searcy on the banks of the Little Red River.

== Location ==
The upper tributaries of the Little Red River are known as the South Fork, the Middle Fork, and the Devils Fork. Prior to the impoundment of Greers Ferry Lake the three tributaries converged just east of Sugar Loaf Mountain.

The South Fork begins in the Ozark National Forest near Scotland in Van Buren County and flows into Greers Ferry Lake near Clinton.

The Middle Fork begins only a few miles from the South Fork near Tilly in Van Buren County but flows northward into Searcy County. In Searcy County the river turns east and flows into Stone County where it turns south and flows to meet Greers Ferry Lake in Cleburne County.

The Devils Fork begins in northeastern Cleburne County, and flows southwest to meet Greers Ferry Lake near Ida.

The three forks converge into the north section of Greers Ferry Lake, which is connected to the south section of the lake by The Narrows, the site of the former Little Red River. The Little Red River begins to flow again at the Greers Ferry Dam at Heber Springs.

Mouth: Confluence with the White River in White County, Arkansas 35°10′54″N 91°26′12″W
Source: At the Greers Ferry Dam in Cleburne County 35°31′15″N 91°59′38″W

== Discharge ==
The Little Red River has an average discharge of 1,830 cubic feet per second at Dewey, Arkansas.

== Below the dam ==
The single channel runs from Greers Ferry Dam to its mouth at the White River near Georgetown. The area around the mouth of the river is within the Henry Gray/Hurricane Lake Wildlife Management Area south of Augusta in White County.

The water level of the lower sections varies greatly because of releases of cold water from the dam at Greers Ferry during power generation. These water releases can be challenging for boaters. The lower section has a varied geography with areas of gravelly rapids, boulder-strewn areas, and slow, deep pools.

The stretch just below the Greers Ferry Dam on the river is well known for its excellent trout fishing. The US Fish and Wildlife Service maintains a trout hatchery just below the dam and releases large numbers of mature trout regularly. The Little Red River was the home of the world-record brown trout (40 pounds 4 ounces (18.3 kg)) from 1992 until 2009.

Because cold water flows from beneath the dam, many native warm-water fish are no longer plentiful. "We had 40 miles of river that was basically worthless," said Tom Lowery of Judsonia, referring to the section of river downstream from Pangburn. "It was pretty to look at, but there was no fishing." While trout thrive near the dam, the cold water drove out many native species. Largemouth bass, crappie, and bream populations may never return to normal.

However, recent attempts have been made to reintroduce sport fish, such as walleye and smallmouth bass, to the section of the Little Red River near Searcy. Tom Bly (District Fisheries Biologist for the Arkansas Game and Fish Commission) noted that the walleye and smallmouth bass were chosen for their coveted taste and renowned fighting abilities, respectively.

Tom Lowery and Bly also mentioned the lack of public access to the river between Pangburn and Searcy and that the recent influx of oil and gas companies to the area may influence this: “We know they are going to drill and they are going to need water, which is a renewable resource,” Bly said. “They want to work with us to make it environmentally and resource friendly. They may be able to help find areas for public access. They seem willing to work on that. It’s a win-win situation."

Carl Garner, in his job as manager of the Little Red River and Greers Ferry Lake, sought participation from the local citizenry to collect trash scattered about the waterways. However, he was without sufficient funding for a staffed cleanup. Eventually, his efforts resulted in the Carl Garner Federal Lands Cleanup Day promoted by Keep America Beautiful.

== See also ==
- List of Arkansas rivers
- Little Red River (Texas)
