= Pangburn, Arkansas =

- City
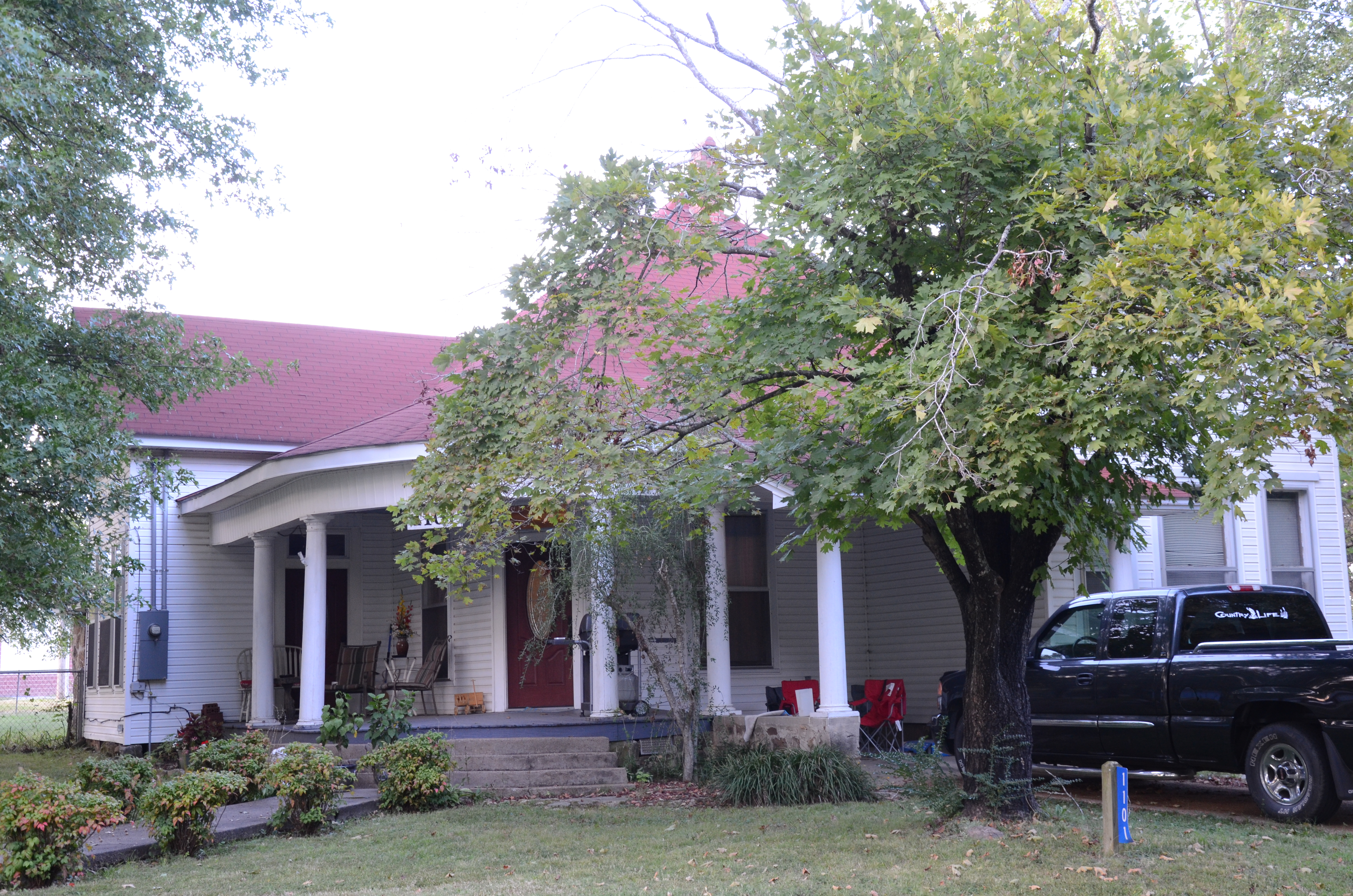
- The Avanell Wright House in Pangburn is listed on the National Register of Historic Places

- Location of Pangburn in White County, Arkansas.
- Coordinates: 35°25′34″N 91°50′22″W
- Country: United States
- State: Arkansas
- County: White

Area
  - Total: 0.54 sq mi (1.41 km^{2})
  - Land: 0.54 sq mi (1.41 km^{2})
  - Water: 0 sq mi (0.00 km^{2})
- Elevation: 338 ft (103 m)

Population (2020)
  - Total: 500
  - Estimate (2025): 506 ▲
  - Density: 917.6/sq mi (354.28/km^{2})
- Time zone: UTC-6 (Central (CST))
  - Summer (DST): UTC-5 (CDT)
- ZIP code: 72121
- Area code: 501
- FIPS code: 05-53240
- GNIS feature ID: 2404470

Pangburn is a city in White County, Arkansas, United States. The population was 500 at the 2020 census.

== Geography ==
According to the United States Census Bureau, the city has a total area of 0.6 square miles (1.6 km^{2}), all land.

== Demographics ==
Historical population
Census	Pop.	Note	%±
1920	706		—
1930	634		−10.2%
1940	595		−6.2%
1950	669		12.4%
1960	489		−26.9%
1970	654		33.7%
1980	673		2.9%
1990	630		−6.4%
2000	654		3.8%
2010	601		−8.1%
2020	500		−16.8%
2025 (est.)	506	▼	1.2%
U.S. Decennial Census

At the 2000 census there were 654 people in 275 households, including 188 families, in the city. The population density was 1,160.1 inhabitants per square mile (447.9/km^{2}). There were 332 housing units at an average density of 588.9 units per square mile (227.4 units/km^{2}). The racial makeup of the city was 98.78% White, 0.15% Black or African American, 0.15% Native American, 0.61% from other races, and 0.31% from two or more races. 1.53% of the population were Hispanic or Latino of any race. Of the 275 households 30.5% had children under the age of 18 living with them, 49.1% were married couples living together, 16.0% had a female householder with no husband present, and 31.6% were non-families. 28.4% of households were one person and 16.4% were one person aged 65 or older. The average household size was 2.38 and the average family size was 2.88.

The age distribution was 28.0% under the age of 18, 8.1% from 18 to 24, 25.1% from 25 to 44, 20.8% from 45 to 64, and 18.0% 65 or older. The median age was 36 years. For every 100 females, there were 87.4 males. For every 100 females age 18 and over, there were 84.0 males.

The median household income was $25,735 and the median family income was $31,250. Males had a median income of $26,750 versus $18,594 for females. The per capita income for the city was $15,234. About 10.1% of families and 15.9% of the population were below the poverty line, including 23.2% of those under age 18 and 16.3% of those age 65 or over.

== Education ==
Public education is provided to elementary and secondary school students by the Pangburn School District, which includes Pangburn High School.
