= Cleburne County, Arkansas =

County in Arkansas, United States

- County
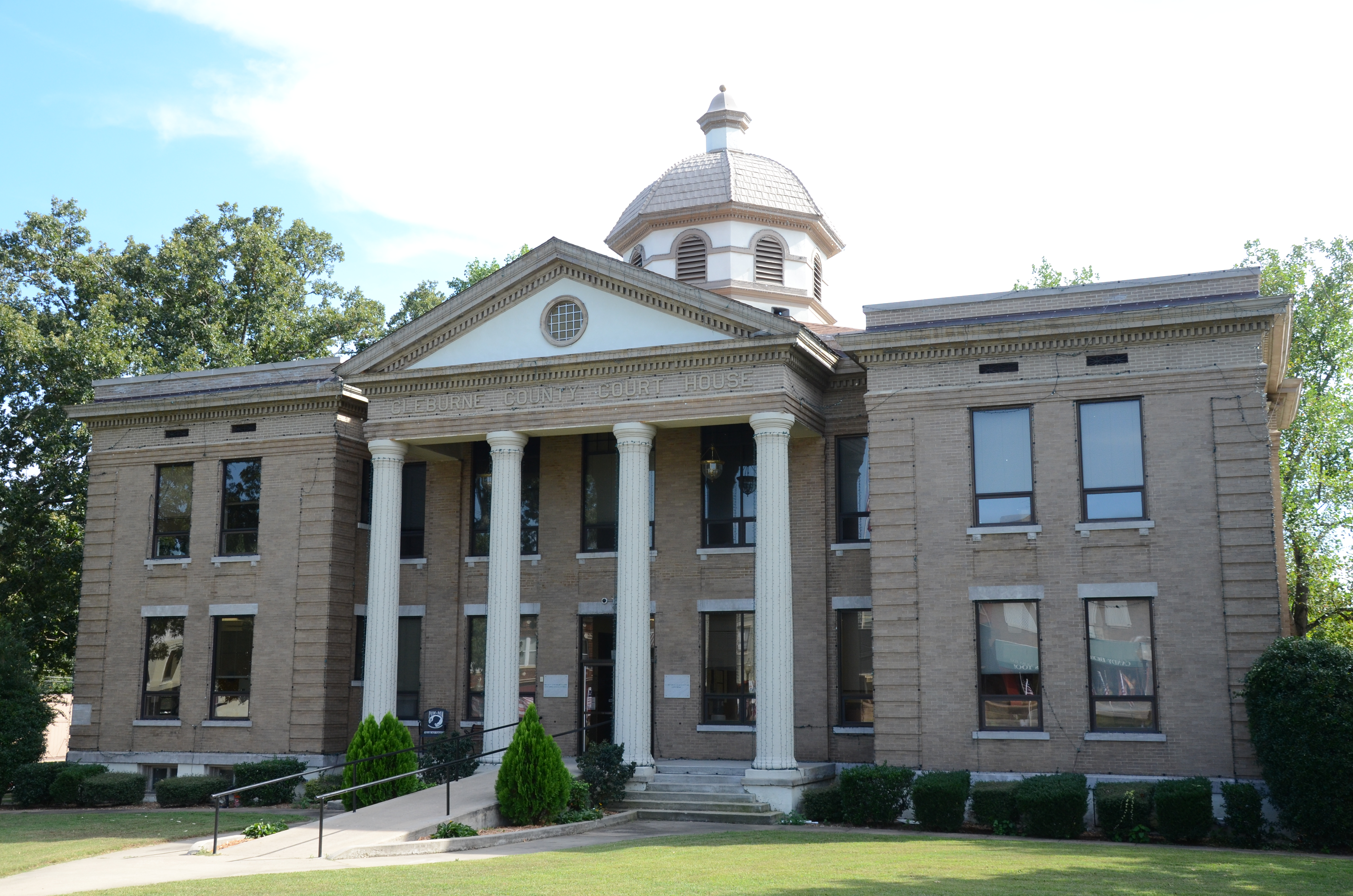
- Cleburne County Courthouse in Heber Springs, Arkansas

- Location within the U.S. state of Arkansas
- Coordinates: 35°32′06″N 92°00′46″W
- Country: United States
- State: Arkansas
- Founded: February 20, 1883
- Named for: Maj. Gen. Patrick Cleburne
- Seat: Heber Springs
- Largest city: Heber Springs

Area
  - Total: 592 sq mi (1,530 km^{2})
  - Land: 554 sq mi (1,430 km^{2})
  - Water: 38 sq mi (98 km^{2}) 6.5%

Population (2020)
  - Total: 24,711
  - Estimate (2025): 25,672 ▲
  - Density: 44.6/sq mi (17.2/km^{2})
- Time zone: UTC−6 (Central)
  - Summer (DST): UTC−5 (CDT)
- Congressional district: 2nd
- Website: www.cleburnecountyar.com

Cleburne County (/ˈkliːbɜːrn/ KLEE-burn, historically /ˈkleɪbɜːrn/ KLAY-burn) is a county located in the north-central portion of the U.S. state of Arkansas. As of the 2020 census, the population was 24,711. The county seat and most populous city is Heber Springs. The county was formed on February 20, 1883, making it the youngest of Arkansas's 75 counties. It is named for Confederate Major-General Patrick Cleburne. Cleburne is an alcohol-prohibition or dry county.

== Geography ==
According to the U.S. Census Bureau, the county has a total area of 592 square miles (1,530 km^{2}), of which 554 square miles (1,430 km^{2}) is land and 38 square miles (98 km^{2}) (6.5%) is water. Much of the water area in the County includes Greers Ferry Lake, which extends westward into neighboring Van Buren County.

=== Major highways ===
- Arkansas Highway 5
- Arkansas Highway 16
- Arkansas Highway 25
  - Arkansas Highway 25B
  - Arkansas Highway 25S
- Arkansas Highway 87
- Arkansas Highway 92
- Arkansas Highway 107
- Arkansas Highway 110
- Arkansas Highway 124
- Arkansas Highway 210
- Arkansas Highway 225
- Arkansas Highway 263
- Arkansas Highway 336
- Arkansas Highway 337
- Arkansas Highway 356
- Arkansas Highway 980

=== Adjacent counties ===
- Stone County (north)
- Independence County (northeast)
- White County (southeast)
- Faulkner County (southwest)
- Van Buren County (west)

== Demographics ==
Historical population
Census	Pop.	Note	%±
1890	7,884		—
1900	9,628		22.1%
1910	11,903		23.6%
1920	12,696		6.7%
1930	11,373		−10.4%
1940	13,134		15.5%
1950	11,487		−12.5%
1960	9,059		−21.1%
1970	10,349		14.2%
1980	16,909		63.4%
1990	19,411		14.8%
2000	24,046		23.9%
2010	25,970		8.0%
2020	24,711		−4.8%
2025 (est.)	25,672	▲	3.9%
U.S. Decennial Census; 1790–1960 1900–1990; 1990–2000 2010

=== 2020 census ===
As of the 2020 census, the county had a population of 24,711. The median age was 50.5 years. 18.7% of residents were under the age of 18 and 27.6% of residents were 65 years of age or older. For every 100 females there were 97.0 males, and for every 100 females age 18 and over there were 95.6 males age 18 and over.

The racial makeup of the county was 92.9% White, 0.3% Black or African American, 0.5% American Indian and Alaska Native, 0.4% Asian, <0.1% Native Hawaiian and Pacific Islander, 0.9% from some other race, and 4.9% from two or more races. Hispanic or Latino residents of any race comprised 2.6% of the population.

27.3% of residents lived in urban areas, while 72.7% lived in rural areas.

There were 10,819 households in the county, of which 23.3% had children under the age of 18 living in them. Of all households, 51.7% were married-couple households, 18.6% were households with a male householder and no spouse or partner present, and 24.4% were households with a female householder and no spouse or partner present. About 29.9% of all households were made up of individuals and 16.1% had someone living alone who was 65 years of age or older.

There were 15,527 housing units, of which 30.3% were vacant. Among occupied housing units, 76.3% were owner-occupied and 23.7% were renter-occupied. The homeowner vacancy rate was 2.7% and the rental vacancy rate was 14.3%.

=== 2000 census ===
As of the 2000 census, there were 24,046 people, 10,190 households, and 7,408 families residing in the county. The population density was 44 people per square mile (17 people/km^{2}). There were 13,732 housing units at an average density of 25 units per square mile (9.7 units/km^{2}). The racial makeup of the county was 98.20% White, 0.12% Black or African American, 0.47% Native American, 0.15% Asian, 0.02% Pacific Islander, 0.15% from other races, and 0.89% from two or more races. 1.17% of the population were Hispanic or Latino of any race.

There were 10,190 households, out of which 26.30% had children under the age of 18 living with them, 61.70% were married couples living together, 7.90% had a female householder with no husband present, and 27.30% were non-families. 24.40% of all households were made up of individuals, and 12.30% had someone living alone who was 65 years of age or older. The average household size was 2.33 and the average family size was 2.74.

In the county, the population was spread out, with 21.30% under the age of 18, 6.60% from 18 to 24, 24.10% from 25 to 44, 26.90% from 45 to 64, and 21.10% who were 65 years of age or older. The median age was 44 years. For every 100 females there were 93.90 males. For every 100 females age 18 and over, there were 92.50 males.

The median income for a household in the county was $31,531, and the median income for a family was $37,273. Males had a median income of $28,844 versus $19,672 for females. The per capita income for the county was $17,250. About 9.00% of families and 13.10% of the population were below the poverty line, including 17.10% of those under age 18 and 11.90% of those age 65 or over.

== Government and politics ==
United States presidential election results for Cleburne County, Arkansas
Year	Republican		Democratic		Third party(ies)	
Year	No.	%	No.	%	No.	%
1884	57	9.66%	527	89.32%	6	1.02%
1888	22	2.85%	483	62.48%	268	34.67%
1892	132	11.99%	606	55.04%	363	32.97%
1896	108	9.26%	1,047	89.79%	11	0.94%
1900	205	25.03%	520	63.49%	94	11.48%
1904	214	31.15%	394	57.35%	79	11.50%
1908	294	31.65%	506	54.47%	129	13.89%
1912	138	15.33%	517	57.44%	245	27.22%
1916	271	23.86%	865	76.14%	0	0.00%
1920	459	38.06%	678	56.22%	69	5.72%
1924	238	26.44%	569	63.22%	93	10.33%
1928	574	39.81%	856	59.36%	12	0.83%
1932	204	10.29%	1,750	88.29%	28	1.41%
1936	336	26.44%	927	72.93%	8	0.63%
1940	374	30.71%	834	68.47%	10	0.82%
1944	582	40.50%	839	58.39%	16	1.11%
1948	312	21.56%	1,061	73.32%	74	5.11%
1952	918	46.58%	1,045	53.02%	8	0.41%
1956	947	46.24%	1,094	53.42%	7	0.34%
1960	1,026	44.96%	1,144	50.13%	112	4.91%
1964	1,221	31.51%	2,645	68.26%	9	0.23%
1968	1,301	31.27%	1,202	28.89%	1,657	39.83%
1972	2,870	67.15%	1,400	32.76%	4	0.09%
1976	1,992	25.77%	5,726	74.07%	13	0.17%
1980	4,042	48.38%	4,021	48.13%	292	3.49%
1984	5,769	64.04%	3,172	35.21%	67	0.74%
1988	4,932	58.85%	3,404	40.62%	45	0.54%
1992	3,580	35.87%	5,090	51.00%	1,310	13.13%
1996	3,807	40.23%	4,475	47.28%	1,182	12.49%
2000	5,730	56.14%	4,120	40.36%	357	3.50%
2004	7,107	60.43%	4,517	38.41%	137	1.16%
2008	7,962	70.22%	2,951	26.03%	425	3.75%
2012	8,693	74.64%	2,620	22.50%	334	2.87%
2016	9,458	78.26%	2,101	17.39%	526	4.35%
2020	10,328	81.45%	1,988	15.68%	364	2.87%
2024	10,595	83.17%	1,941	15.24%	203	1.59%

=== Government ===
The county government is a constitutional body granted specific powers by the Constitution of Arkansas and the Arkansas Code. The quorum court is the legislative branch of the county government and controls all spending and revenue collection. Representatives are called justices of the peace and are elected from county districts every even-numbered year. The number of districts in a county vary from nine to fifteen, and district boundaries are drawn by the county election commission. The Cleburne County Quorum Court has eleven members. Presiding over quorum court meetings is the county judge, who serves as the chief executive officer of the county. The county judge is elected at-large and does not vote in quorum court business, although capable of vetoing quorum court decisions.

Cleburne County, Arkansas Elected countywide officials
Position	Officeholder	Party
County Judge	Eric Crosby	Republican
County Clerk	Sherry Logan	Republican
Circuit Clerk	Heather Smith	Republican
Sheriff	Chris Brown	Republican
Treasurer	Felicia Hipp	Republican
Collector	Connie Caldwell	Republican
Assessor	Rachelle Hipp Miller	Republican
Coroner	Waren Olmstead	Republican
Surveyor	Perry Sayles	(Unknown)

The composition of the Quorum Court following the 2024 elections is 11 Republicans. Justices of the Peace (members) of the Quorum Court following the elections are:

- District 1: Brian Moorehead (R)
- District 2: Sam Henegar (R)
- District 3: Stephen Beavers (R)
- District 4: Linda Fletcher (R)
- District 5: Alan Malone (R)
- District 6: Chad Evans (R)
- District 7: Jacque Martin (R)
- District 8: Brent Foust (R)
- District 9: Charles Tamburo (R)
- District 10: Mark Baugh (R)
- District 11: Jeremy Mcclung (R)

Additionally, the townships of Cleburne County are entitled to elect their own respective constables, as set forth by the Constitution of Arkansas Constables are largely of historical significance as they were used to keep the peace in rural areas when travel was more difficult. The township constables as of the 2024 elections are:

- District 1: Christopher Gracey (R)
- District 2: Harold B. Williams (R)

=== Politics ===
A typical Solid South county for most of its history, voting overwhelmingly for Democratic candidates, Cleburne County has trended heavily towards the GOP in recent decades. As of 2024, the last Democrat to carry this county was Bill Clinton in 1996.

== Communities ==
=== Cities ===
- Fairfield Bay (mostly in Van Buren County)
- Greers Ferry
- Heber Springs (county seat)
- Quitman (partly in Faulkner County)

=== Towns ===
- Concord
- Higden

=== Census-designated place ===
- Drasco
- Edgemont
- Tumbling Shoals
- Wilburn

=== Townships ===
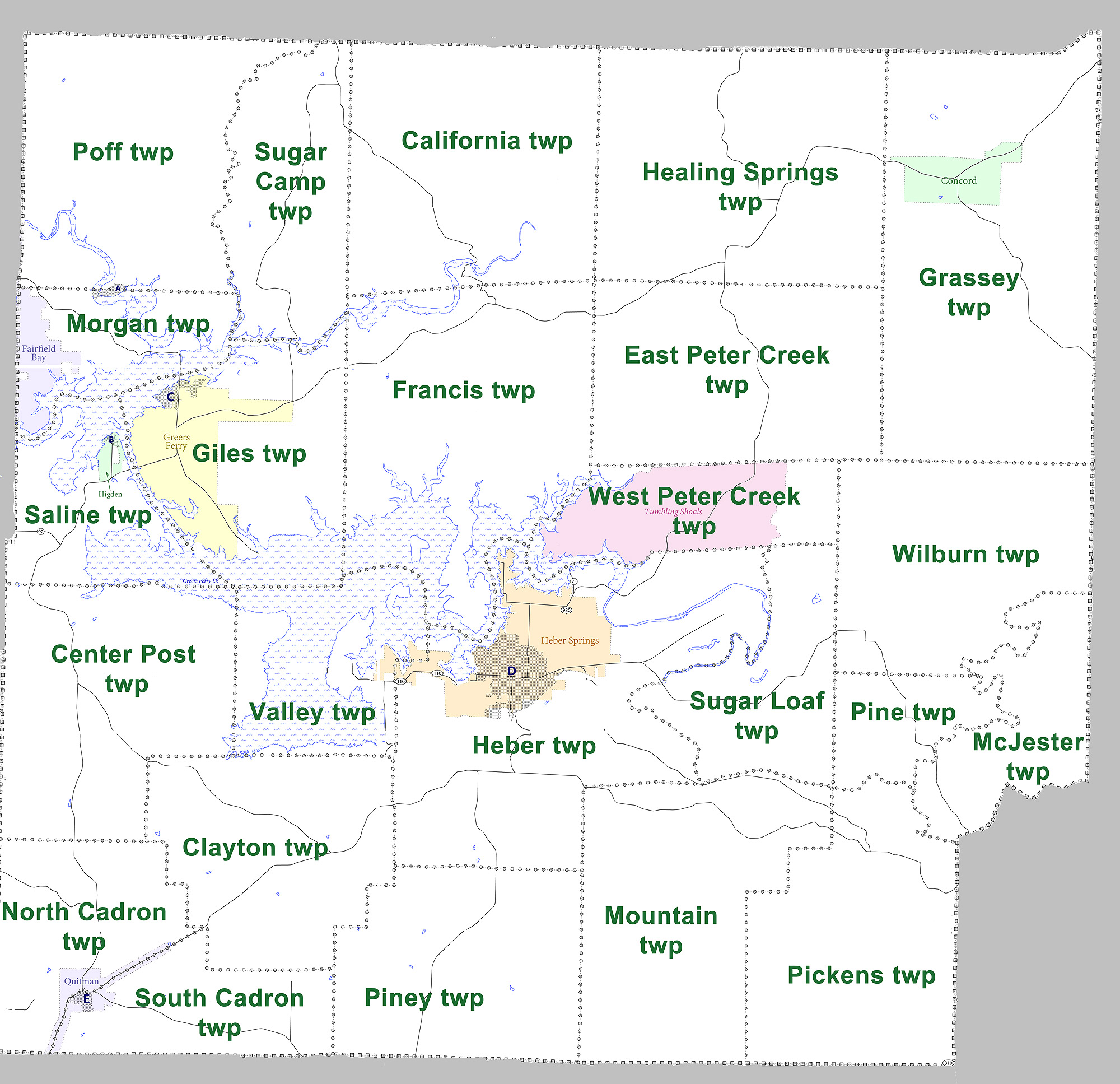
Townships in Cleburne County, Arkansas as of 2010

Townships in Arkansas are the divisions of a county. Each township includes unincorporated areas; some may have incorporated cities or towns within part of their boundaries. Arkansas townships have limited purposes in modern times. However, the United States census does list Arkansas population based on townships (sometimes referred to as "county subdivisions" or "minor civil divisions"). Townships are also of value for historical purposes in terms of genealogical research. Each town or city is within one or more townships in an Arkansas county based on census maps and publications. The townships of Cleburne County are listed below; listed in parentheses are the cities, towns, and/or census-designated places that are fully or partially inside the township.

- California
- Center Post
- Clayton
- East Peter Creek
- Francis
- Giles (Greers Ferry)
- Grassey (Concord)
- Healing Springs
- Heber (most of Heber Springs)
- McJester
- Morgan (part of Fairfield Bay)
- Mountain
- North Cadron (part of Quitman)
- Pickens
- Pine
- Piney
- Poff
- Saline (Higden)
- South Cadron (part of Quitman)
- Sugar Camp
- Sugar Loaf
- Valley (part of Heber Springs)
- West Peter Creek (Tumbling Shoals)
- Wilburn

== Education ==
School districts include:

- Concord Public Schools
- Heber Springs School District
- Midland School District
- Pangburn School District
- Quitman School District
- Rose Bud School District
- Searcy School District
- West Side School District

== See also ==
- List of lakes in Cleburne County, Arkansas
- National Register of Historic Places listings in Cleburne County, Arkansas
- List of counties in Arkansas
