= Greers Ferry Lake =

Reservoir in Arkansas, US

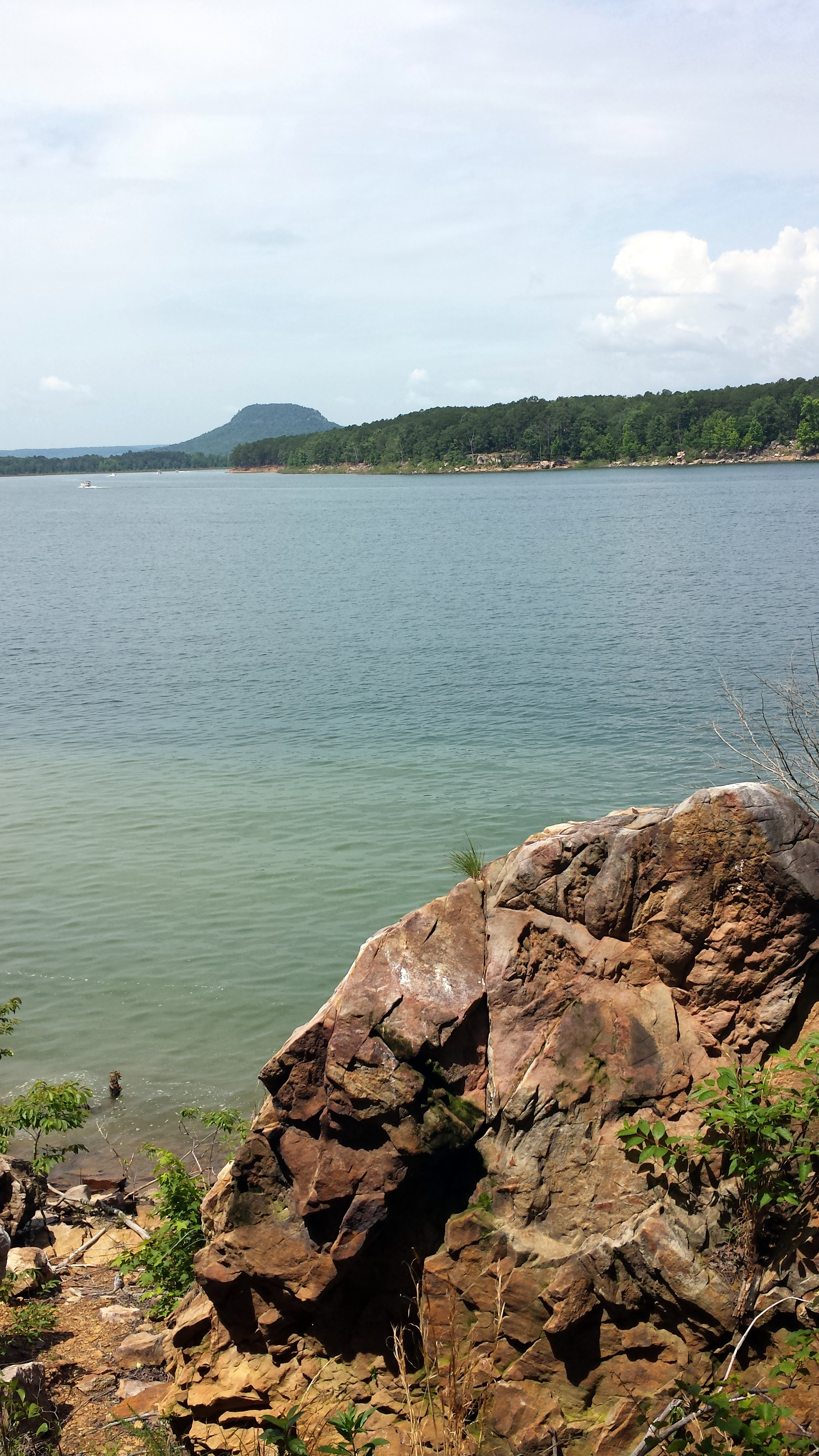
- Lake with Sugarloaf Mountain visible on the horizon

- Location within Arkansas
- Location: Cleburne / Van Buren counties, Arkansas, US
- Coordinates: 35.5339°N 92.1298°W
- Type: reservoir
- Primary inflows: Little Red River
- Primary outflows: Little Red River
- Basin countries: United States
- Surface area: 40,500 acres (164 km^{2})
- Max. depth: 198 ft (60 m)

Greers Ferry Lake is the reservoir formed by Greers Ferry Dam, a United States Army Corps of Engineers dam in Northern Arkansas. It is located about 60 miles (100 km) north of Little Rock.

== Geography ==
The reservoir consists of two lakes connected by a water-filled gorge called the Narrows. The area of the two lakes and the Narrows totals about 40,500 acres (164 km^{2}) with a combined shoreline of just over 340 miles (550 km). In the 1800s there was a town, Higden, in the valley flooded by the lake. The farmers in Higden had constant trouble with flooding. The land was purchased, residents left and the city was abandoned, the cemeteries were moved, and the area was allowed to flood. The town has since been re-established on a nearby hill. Many nearby residents and several eyewitness accounts tell that homes and buildings still stand under the water to this day. Several roads in town can be followed to the shore where they disappear under the water, and surface on the opposite side of the lake. Most of these roads are now used as launch ramps for boats. Old West Main Street in Heber Springs is an example. One road in particular near "Sandy Beach" in Heber Springs is a popular fireworks show in the area during July, and can be reached by divers without equipment.

In 1969, former Greers Ferry Lake Resident Engineer Carl Garner started and led the first Annual Greers Ferry Lake & Little Red River Association litter cleanup. In 1990, the Great Arkansas Cleanup was developed, based on the Greers Ferry Lake & Little Red River Association model that Mr. Garner started.

The normal pool of Greers Ferry Lake is 461.3 feet (140.6 m) above sea level. The lowest safe level of the lake with still being able to generate hydroelectric power is 435.0 feet (132.6 m). The lake has flooded various times. The lake crested at 483.95 feet (147.51 m) in 1973. It crested above 485 feet (148 m) in 1982. In April 2008, the lake topped the previous high from 1982. On April 11, 2008 the lake topped 486 feet (148 m), only a few feet away from many local houses.

== Recreational use ==
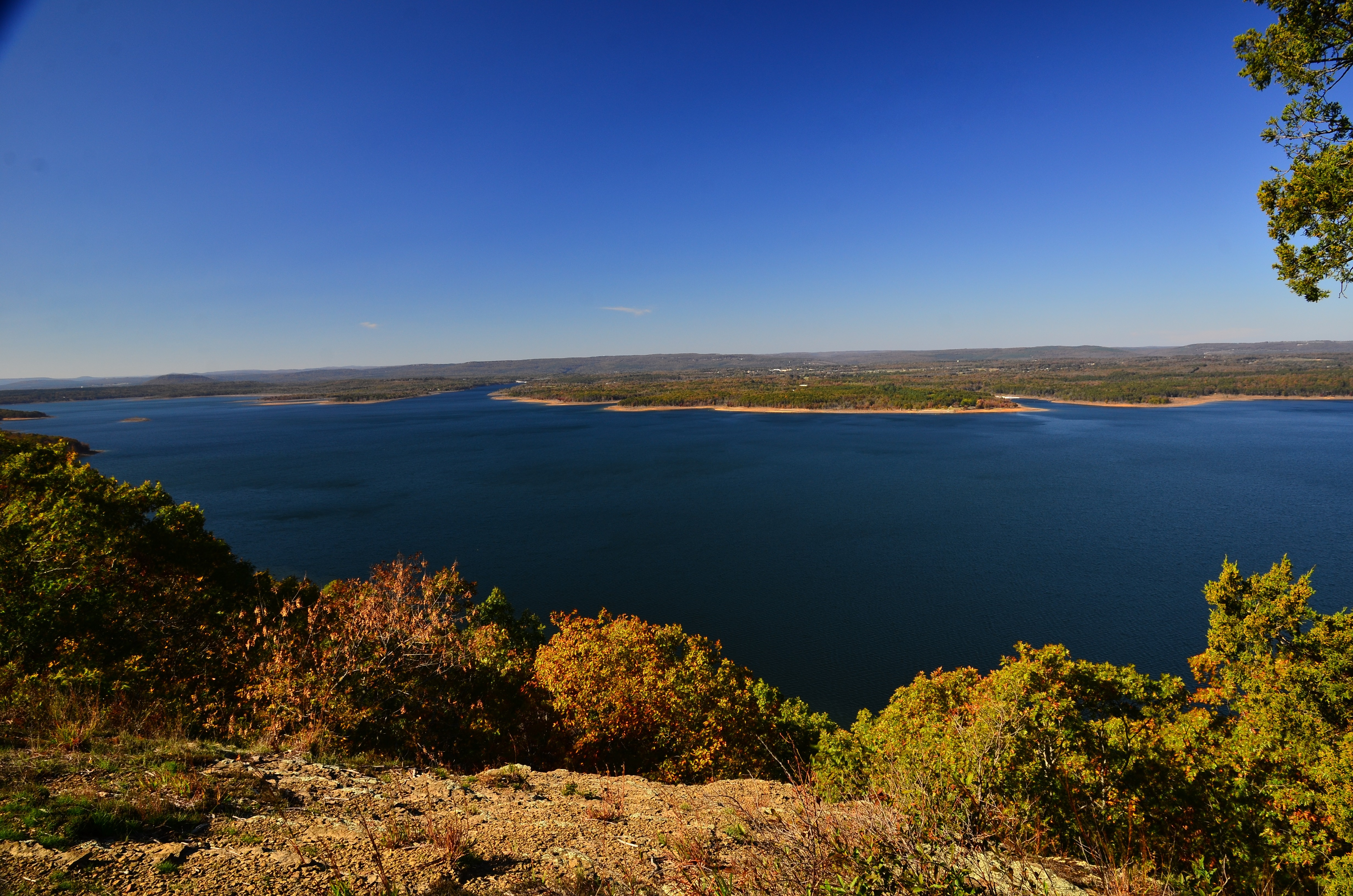
Greers Ferry Lake from The Bluffs at Miller's Point

Since the formation of Greers Ferry Lake in the early 1960s, tourism has thrived around the lake, and the population has topped 6,000 in Heber Springs. Through the 1970s, many luxurious neighborhoods were built around the lake, and continue to be built. Various activities are available to the public: swimming, cliff diving, boating, fishing, scuba diving, camping, and other water recreational activities are popular among locals and tourists alike. Recently famous for rainbow trout, the Little Red River, in the cool water coming from under the dam, has become a favorite fishing spot year round. Several camp grounds and boat docks/ramps offer direct access to the river. Also, small neighborhoods have been built around the Little Red River.

A 12.38-kilogram (27.3 lb) hybrid striped bass was caught in Greers Ferry Lake on May 24, 1997 by angler Jerald Shaum, setting an International Game Fish Association world record.

== See also ==
- Greers Ferry, Arkansas
- Higden
- Tannenbaum
