= Mozart, Stone County, Arkansas =

Mozart, Arkansas
- Unincorporated community
- Location within Arkansas Location within the United States
- Coordinates: 35°50′08″N 92°19′05″W
- Country: United States
- State: Arkansas
- County: Stone
- Elevation: 1,585 ft (483 m)
- Time zone: UTC-6 (Central (CST))
  - Summer (DST): UTC-5 (CDT)
- Area code: 870
- GNIS feature ID: 58230

Mozart is an unincorporated community in Stone County, Arkansas, United States. It is in the Ozark Mountains region of the northern part of the state located on Arkansas Highway 263.

== History ==
The area was settled as an outgrowth of the Timbo and Fox communities. It had a post office from 1926 to 1959, when service was transferred to Fox. Named for Wolfgang Amadeus Mozart, local histories contend it was named either by the postmaster's daughter, who was a fan of Mozart, or by Austrian immigrants to the area.

The Skyland School served Mozart from 1926 until school consolidation in 1946 brought the area into the Rural Special School District. Rural Special was merged into Mountain View School District in 2004.
