= Arkansas Highway 263 =

State highway in Arkansas, United States

Highway 263
- AR 263 highlighted in red

Route information
- Maintained by ArDOT
- Length: 43.74 mi (70.39 km)
- Existed: July 10, 1957–present

Major junctions
- South end: AR 92
- AR 9 at Rushing; AR 66 at Timbo
- North end: AR 14 in Big Flat

Location
- Country: United States
- State: Arkansas
- Counties: Cleburne, Stone, Baxter

Highway system
- Arkansas Highway System; Interstate; US; State; Business; Spurs; Suffixed; Scenic; Heritage
← AR 262	→ AR 264

Highway 263 (AR 263, Ark. 263, and Hwy. 263) is a north–south state highway in the Arkansas Ozark Mountains. A low-volume, two-lane road, Highway 263 connects several rural unincorporated communities to the state highway system. The highway was first established on July 10, 1957, in Stone County and extended by the Arkansas State Highway Commission in 1963 and 1965. A second segment was created in Cleburne County in 1963, and the gap was closed between the two segments in 1994. The route is maintained by the Arkansas Department of Transportation (ARDOT).

== Route description ==
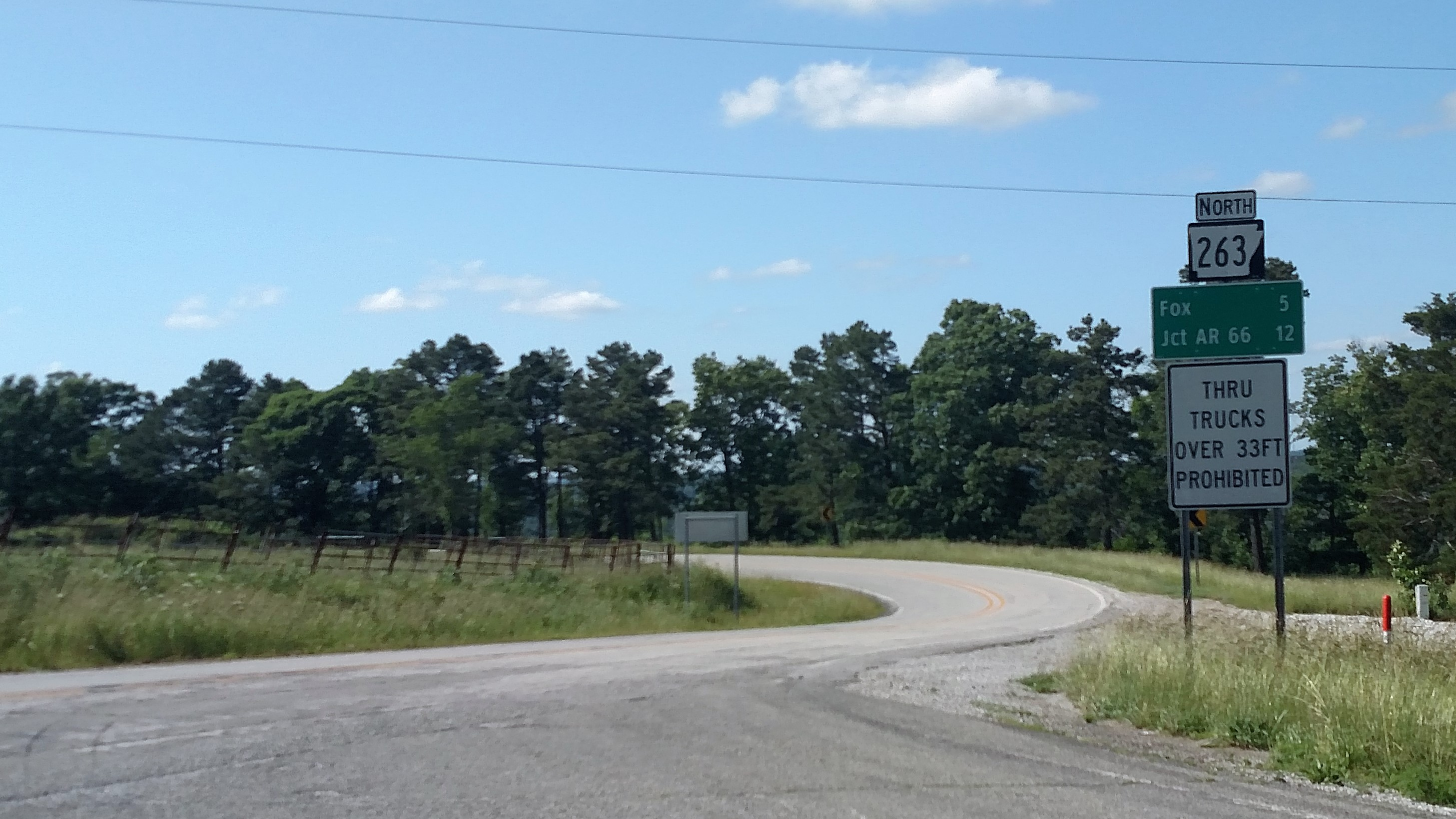
Highway 263 at Rushing

Highway 263 begins in the Lower Boston Mountains, a subset of the Ozark Mountains ecoregion, and winds north to the Dissected Springfield Plateau-Elk River Hills within the Ozark Highlands.

The highway begins at Highway 92 approximately 3 miles (4.8 km) northeast of Greers Ferry, a small city on Greers Ferry Lake in northern Cleburne County. Highway 263 runs north, crossing the Devil's Fork of the Little Red River and passing through the sparsely populated wooded hills of the Boston Mountains. The highway passes through the National Register of Historic Places-listed Woodrow Store in the unincorporated community of Woodrow before intersecting Highway 225 in Prim. Continuing north into Stone County, the highway winds west through forested hills along the northern edge of the Cherokee Wildlife Management Area (WMA) and the community of Parma before forming a concurrency with Highway 9 through Rushing. West of this overlap, Highway 263 turns northward, continuing through rural areas and small communities Fox and Mozart toward a concurrency with Highway 66 at Timbo.

Turning north from Timbo, Highway 263 continues through sparsely populated rural areas. Beginning at Onia, the highway serves as the southwestern limits of the Sylamore WMA, while also passing another segment of the Cherokee WMA on the highway's western side. The highway enters the southern corner of Baxter County, terminating at Highway 14 in the small town of Big Flat.

The ARDOT maintains Highway 263 like all other parts of the state highway system. As a part of these responsibilities, the department tracks the volume of traffic using its roads in surveys using a metric called average annual daily traffic (AADT). ARDOT estimates the traffic level for a segment of roadway for any average day of the year in these surveys. As of 2017, the peak AADT on the highway (excluding concurrencies) was 710 vehicles per day (VPD) north of Timbo. All remaining segments were below 700 VPD, dropping below 400 VPD in some segments. For reference, the American Association of State Highway and Transportation Officials (AASHTO), classifies roads with fewer than 400 vehicles per day as a very low volume local road.

No segment of Highway 263 has been listed as part of the National Highway System, a network of roads important to the nation's economy, defense, and mobility.

== History ==
The Arkansas General Assembly passed the Act 148 of 1957, the Milum Road Act, creating 10–12 miles (16–19 km) of new state highways in each county. Highway 263 was created by the Arkansas State Highway Commission between Rushing and Timbo on July 10, 1957. During another period of highway system expansion in 1963, the highway was extended north from Timbo through Onia, and a second segment was created from Brownsville to the Cleburne-Stone county line. It was extended north to Big Flat on June 23, 1965.

Highway 263 would remain unchanged for 30 years, until a study was requested by the Stone County Judge and various members of the Arkansas General Assembly to consider closing the gap between the two segments by adopting Stone County Road 18 (CR 18) into the state highway system in 1993. The study recommended taking CR 18 into the state highway system and upgrading it to state highway standards, finding that "due to recent transfers of state highway mileage to counties and cities in the region, no increase in total state highway mileage or increase in financial obligation will be incurred by this addition". The Highway Commission accepted the transfer on April 28, 1994.

== Major intersections ==
Mile markers reset at some concurrencies.

County	Location	mi	km	Destinations	Notes
Cleburne		0.00	0.00	AR 92 – Greers Ferry, Drasco	Southern terminus
Cleburne		1.70– 1.80	2.74– 2.90	Bridge over Devils Fork, Little Red River	
Cleburne	Prim	7.80	12.55	AR 225 south	AR 225 northern terminus
Stone	Rushing	18.51– 19.77	29.79– 31.82	AR 9 – Mountain View, Shirley	officially designated exception
Stone	Timbo	31.93– 0.00	51.39– 0.00	AR 66 – Mountain View, Alco, Leslie	
Baxter	Big Flat	11.81	19.01	AR 14	Northern terminus
1.000 mi = 1.609 km; 1.000 km = 0.621 mi: Concurrency terminus

== See also ==
- List of state highways in Arkansas

== Sources ==
- "Minutes of the Meeting of the Arkansas State Highway Commission" (PDF). Little Rock: Arkansas State Highway Commission. 1953–1969. OCLC 21798861. Archived from the original (PDF) on October 1, 2018.
- "Minutes of the Meeting of the Arkansas State Highway Commission" (PDF). Little Rock: Arkansas State Highway Commission. 1970–1979. OCLC 21798861. Archived from the original (PDF) on November 5, 2011.
- "Minutes of the Meeting of the Arkansas State Highway Commission" (PDF). Little Rock: Arkansas State Highway Commission. 1980–1989. OCLC 21798861.
- "Minutes of the Meeting of the Arkansas State Highway Commission" (PDF). Little Rock: Arkansas State Highway Commission. 1990–1999. OCLC 21798861. Archived from the original (PDF) on July 21, 2019.
- "Minutes of the Meeting of the Arkansas State Highway Commission" (PDF). Little Rock: Arkansas State Highway Commission. 2000–2009. OCLC 21798861.
- "Minutes of the Meeting of the Arkansas State Highway Commission" (PDF). Little Rock: Arkansas State Highway Commission. 2010–2019. OCLC 21798861. Archived from the original (PDF) on March 4, 2016.
