= Rushing =

Rushing means a sudden forward motion, or a surge or onslaught.

Rushing may refer to:

== Tactics ==
- Rush (gridiron football), advancing the ball by running on offense. On defense, charging the quarterback or kicker is a pass rush.
- Human wave attack, an offensive infantry tactic
- Rush (video gaming), a fast attack or preemptive strike intended to overwhelm an unprepared opponent, or a mass attack hoping to win by sheer numerical superiority

== Other uses ==
- Rushing (surname), a list of people
- Rushing, Arkansas, an unincorporated community in the United States
- Rushing, a 1999 Moby song from Play
- Rushing, a component of new member recruitment for fraternities
- Rushing (sororities), a component of new member recruitment for sororities
