= Timbo Schools =

Location
- 23747 Hwy 263; Timbo, Arkansas, Stone County 72680; United States; 35°52′32″N 92°19′3″W

Information
- Status: Open
- School district: Mountain View School District (Timbo Schools)
- Superintendent: Dusty Mitchell
- Principal: Shelia Mitchell
- Grades: PreK-12
- Classes offered: Regular, Advanced Placement
- Hours in school day: 7
- Colors: Black and gold
- Athletics: Basketball, track & field, shooting sports, and dance
- Athletics conference: 1A 2 South
- Mascot: Tiger
- Team name: Timbo Tigers
- Rival: Rural Special Rebels
- Website: timbotigers.k12.ar.us

Timbo Schools is a small public school located in Timbo, Arkansas, in central Stone County. It is a part of the Mountain View School District.

== History ==
It was previously a part of the Stone County School District. On July 1, 2004, that district consolidated with Rural Special School District into the existing Mountain View School District.

== Academics ==
Timbo Schools is a K-12 school district that provides students in and around the small town of Timbo in central Stone County, Arkansas. The assumed course of study for students follows the Smart Core curriculum developed by the Arkansas Department of Education (ADE). Students complete regular (core and elective) and career focus courses and may select Advanced Placement (AP) coursework and exams that provide an opportunity to receive college credit. Timbo High School was listed unranked in the Best High Schools Report 2012 developed by U.S. News & World Report.

== Extracurricular activities ==
The district operates a single school, Timbo Elementary School, which serves students in grades K-6, and Timbo High School, which serves students in grades 7-12. The school offers a variety of educational programs including language arts, social studies, science, math and elective courses in subjects like music, art and physical education. The district also offers a wide range of extraclassroom activities such as sports, clubs and academic competitions. The Timbo High School mascot and athletic emblem is the tiger with school colors of black and gold.

=== Athletics ===
For 2012–14, the Timbo Tigers participate in interscholastic sporting activities as part of the 1A Classification—the state's smallest classification—within the 1A 2 South Conference administered by the Arkansas Activities Association. The Tigers compete in basketball, track and field, shooting sports, and dance.

In the 2026-27 school year, the Timbo Tigers remained in the 1A classification for both girls and boys athletics.
