= Turkey Creek, Arkansas =

- Unincorporated community
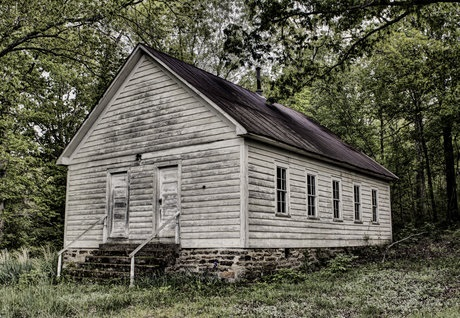
- Old Schoolhouse in Turkey Creek

- Location within Arkansas Location within the United States
- Coordinates: 35°45′59″N 92°12′36″W
- Country: United States
- State: Arkansas
- County: Stone
- Elevation: 935 ft (285 m)
- Time zone: UTC-6 (Central (CST))
  - Summer (DST): UTC-5 (CDT)
- Area code: 870
- GNIS feature ID: 55710

Turkey Creek is an unincorporated community in Stone County, Arkansas, United States. Turkey Creek is located on Arkansas Highway 9, 8.7 miles (14.0 km) southwest of Mountain View. The Turkey Creek School, which is listed on the National Register of Historic Places, is located in Turkey Creek.
