= Rural Special High School =

Location
- 13237 AR 263; Fox, Arkansas 72042-1826; United States
- Coordinates: 35°45′15.6″N 92°17′17″W

Information
- School type: Public comprehensive
- Status: Open
- School district: Mountain View School District (2004-); Rural Special School District (-2004)
- CEEB code: 042190
- NCES School ID: 051020000965
- Principal: Tanya Stewart
- Teaching staff: 15.68 (on FTE basis)
- Grades: 7–12
- Enrollment: 85 (2023–2024)
  - Grade 7: 16
  - Grade 8: 7
  - Grade 9: 16
  - Grade 10: 17
  - Grade 11: 14
  - Grade 12: 15
- Student to teacher ratio: 5.42
- Education system: ADE Smart Core
- Classes offered: Regular, Advanced Placement (AP)
- Colors: Red and white
- Athletics: Basketball, baseball, softball
- Athletics conference: 1A East
- Mascot: Rebel
- Team name: Rural Special Rebels
- Accreditation: ADE
- Communities served: Fox, Meadowcreek, Mozart, Parma, Rushing, Sunnyland, and Turkey Creek
- Federal Funding: Title I
- Website: www.ruralspecial.com

Rural Special High School is a comprehensive public high school based in the rural, fringe community of Fox, Arkansas, United States. As one of the smallest schools in the state, the school provides secondary education for students in grades 7 through 12 for the rural, isolated communities of Fox, Meadowcreek, Mozart, Parma, Rushing, Sunnyland, and Turkey Creek. As a result of school district consolidations within the state, Rural Special is one of three high schools consolidated to form the Mountain View School District based in Stone County, Arkansas.

== History ==
It was a part of the Rural Special School District until July 1, 2004, when that district consolidated into the existing Mountain View School District.

== Academics ==
Rural Special High School is accredited by the Arkansas Department of Education (ADE) and the assumed course of study follows the Smart Core curriculum developed by the ADE, which requires students complete at least 22 units prior to graduation. Students complete regular (core and elective) and career focus courses and exams and may take Advanced Placement (AP) courses and exam with the opportunity to receive college credit. Rural Special receives Title I federal funding.

== Extracurricular activities ==
The Rural Special High School mascot and athletic emblem is the Rebel with red and white serving as the school colors.

=== Athletics ===
The Rural Special Rebels compete in interscholastic activities within the 1A Classification—the state's smallest classification—from the 1A 2 South Conference, as administered by the Arkansas Activities Association. The Rebels field teams in basketball (boys/girls), baseball, and fastpitch softball.
