= Stone County School District (Arkansas) =

Defunct school district in Arkansas, United States

Stone County School District No. 1 was a school district headquartered in Timbo in unincorporated Stone County, Arkansas. It operated Timbo Elementary School (K-6) and Timbo High School (7-12).

== History ==
On July 1, 1993, the Tri-County School District dissolved, and the Stone County district absorbed a portion of it. On July 1, 2004, the Stone County district consolidated with Rural Special School District into the existing Mountain View School District.
