= Mountain View High School (Arkansas) =

Location
- 210 High School Drive; Mountain View, Arkansas 72560; United States
- Coordinates: 35°51′36″N 92°5′5″W

Information
- School type: Public comprehensive
- Status: Open
- School district: Mountain View School District
- CEEB code: 041750
- NCES School ID: 051020000749
- Teaching staff: 55.04 (on FTE basis)
- Grades: 9–12
- Enrollment: 329 (2023-2024)
- Student to teacher ratio: 5.98
- Classes offered: Regular, Career Focus, Advanced Placement
- Colors: Blue and gold
- Athletics conference: 3A 1 (2012–14)
- Mascot: Yellowjacket
- Team name: Mountain View Yellowjackets
- Accreditation: ADE
- Website: www.mvhs.k12.ar.us

Mountain View High School (MVHS) is the only public secondary school located in the city of Mountain View, in Stone County, Arkansas.

== Academics ==
The school is accredited by the Arkansas Department of Education (ADE). The assumed course of study for students is the ADE Smart Core curriculum, which requires students to complete at least 22 units of credit. Students complete regular (core and career focus) courses and exams and may select Advanced Placement (AP) coursework and exams that provide an opportunity for college credit prior to high school graduation.

== Extracurricular activities ==
The mascot of the school is the Yellowjacket. The school colors are blue and gold.

=== Athletics ===
For 2012–14, the Mountain View Yellowjackets compete in the 3A 1 Conference as administered by the Arkansas Activities Association. The Yellowjackets participate in football, soccer, men's and women's basketball, baseball, softball, men's and women's golf, men's and women's tennis, wrestling, cheerleading, and men's and women's track and field. The school also sponsors a women's dance team which won the 2008-2009 State Championship, as well as the 2010-2011, 2015-2016, and 2022-2023 State Championships. In the past has fielded a swim team.

- Basketball: The girls' basketball team won the 3A state basketball championship in 2011, 2019, and were co-champions in 2020.

=== Other Activities ===
- Quiz Bowl: The quiz bowl team has won 3A state championships in 2019, 2021, 2022, and 2023.
