= Mountain View Airport (Arkansas) =

Coordinates: 35°51′52″N 092°05′25″W

Mountain View Airport Harry E. Wilcox Memorial Field
- IATA: none; ICAO: none; FAA LID: 7M2

Summary
- Airport type: Public
- Owner: City of Mountain View
- Serves: Mountain View, Arkansas
- Elevation AMSL: 805 ft (245 m)
- Interactive map of Mountain View Airport

Runways
Direction	Length		Surface
Direction	ft	m	Surface
9/27	4,502	1,372	Asphalt

Statistics (2005)
- Aircraft operations: 11,000
- Source: Federal Aviation Administration

Mountain View Airport (FAA LID: 7M2), also known as Harry E. Wilcox Memorial Field, is a public airport located two miles (3 km) east of the central business district of Mountain View, a city in Stone County, Arkansas, United States. It is owned by the City of Mountain View.

== Facilities and aircraft ==
Mountain View Airport covers an area of 88 acres (36 ha) which contains one asphalt paved runway (9/27) measuring 4,502 x 70 ft (1,372 x 21 m). For the 12-month period ending January 31, 2005, the airport had 11,000 aircraft operations, an average of 30 per day: 95% general aviation and 5% military.

== See also ==
- List of airports in Arkansas
