= Pleasant Hill, Stone County, Arkansas =

Pleasant Hill, Arkansas
- Unincorporated community
- Location within Arkansas Location within the United States
- Coordinates: 35°55′04″N 92°17′53″W
- Country: United States
- State: Arkansas
- County: Stone
- Elevation: 945 ft (288 m)
- Time zone: UTC-6 (Central (CST))
  - Summer (DST): UTC-5 (CDT)
- Area code: 870
- GNIS feature ID: 73126

Pleasant Hill is an unincorporated community in Stone County, Arkansas, United States. Pleasant Hill is 10.7 miles (17.2 km) west-northwest of Mountain View.
