= Tri-County School District (Arkansas) =

School district in Arkansas, United States

Tri-County School District was a school district in Arkansas. It served all or parts of: Baxter, Izard, Searcy, and Stone counties. It included the communities of Big Flat and Fifty Six.

It was formed on July 1, 1985, by the merger of Big Flat School District and the Fifty Six School District. On July 1, 1993, it was disestablished with territory given to the following districts: Calico Rock, Marshall, Mountain View, Norfork, and Stone County.
