= Jimmy Driftwood =

American singer-songwriter (1907–1998)

- Driftwood posing with his unusual guitar

Background information
- Also known as: Jimmy Driftwood
- Born: James Corbitt Morris; June 20, 1907; Timbo, Arkansas
- Died: July 12, 1998 (aged 91) Fayetteville, Arkansas
- Genres: Country and Western folk Pop
- Occupations: Musician; songwriter; instructor; environmentalist
- Instruments: Vocals; guitar; banjo; fiddle; dulcimer; mouth bow
- Years active: 1925–1975
- Labels: RCA; Rounder; Monument
- Website: www.jimmydriftwood.com

James Corbitt Morris (June 20, 1907 – July 12, 1998), known professionally as Jimmy Driftwood or Jimmie Driftwood, was an American folk-style songwriter and musician, most famous for his songs "The Battle of New Orleans" and "Tennessee Stud". Driftwood wrote more than 6,000 folk songs,300 of which were recorded by various musicians.

== Biography ==
=== Early life ===
Driftwood was born in Timbo, Arkansas, United States, on June 20, 1907. His father was folk singer Neal Morris. Driftwood learned to play the guitar at a young age on his grandfather's homemade instrument. Driftwood used that unique guitar throughout his career and noted that its neck was made from a fence rail, its sides from an old ox yoke, and the head and bottom from the headboard of his grandmother's bed. This homemade instrument produced a pleasant, distinctive, resonant sound. He is on the album Songs of the Ozarks.

Driftwood attended John Brown College in northwest Arkansas and later received a degree in education from Arkansas State Teacher's College. He started writing songs during his teaching career to teach his students history in an entertaining manner.

=== 1920s and 1930s ===
During the 1920s and 1930s, Driftwood left Arkansas, eventually hitchhiking through the Southwestern United States. In Arizona, he entered and won a local song contest.

In 1936, Driftwood married Cleda Johnson, who was one of his former students, and returned to Arkansas to raise a family and resume his teaching career. During this time, Driftwood wrote hundreds of songs, but he did not pursue a musical career seriously.

He wrote his later-famous "Battle of New Orleans" in 1936, to help a high-school class he was teaching become interested in the event.

=== 1950s ===
In the 1950s, he changed his name to Jimmy Driftwood, both publicly and legally.

In 1957, a Nashville, Tennessee, song publisher learned of Driftwood, auditioned him, and signed him to his first record deal. Driftwood recalled playing some 100 of his songs in one day, of which 20 were chosen to be recorded. Driftwood's first album, Newly Discovered Early American Folk Songs, received good reviews but did not sell particularly well.

"The Battle of New Orleans" was included on the album, but did not conform to the radio standards of the time because of the words "hell" and "damn" in the lyrics. Driftwood said that at the time, those words could be preached but not sung in secular contexts for broadcast. Driftwood was asked to make a shorter censored version of the song for a live radio performance. Singer Johnny Horton, after hearing the song, contacted Driftwood and told him that he wished to record his own version.

Driftwood left Arkansas for Nashville and became popular by his appearances on programs including the Grand Ole Opry, Ozark Jubilee, and Louisiana Hayride. He was invited to sing for Soviet Premier Nikita Khrushchev as an example of traditional American music during the leader's 1959 state visit to the United States. He became a member of the Opry in the 1950s.

The popular peak of Driftwood's career came in 1959, when he had no fewer than six songs on the popular and country music charts, including Johnny Horton's recording of his "The Battle of New Orleans", which remained in first place on the country music singles chart for 10 weeks, and atop the popular music chart for six weeks that year. The song won the 1959 Grammy Award for Song of the Year.

After Horton's success, Driftwood performed at Carnegie Hall and at major American folk music festivals before returning home to Timbo, Arkansas, in 1962. During his recording career, Driftwood also won Grammy Awards for "Wilderness Road", "Songs of Billy Yank and Johnny Reb", and "Tennessee Stud". Driftwood songs were recorded by Eddy Arnold, Johnny Cash, Hawkshaw Hawkins, Homer and Jethro (the parody "The Battle of Kookamonga"), Odetta, Doc Watson, and others. In 1959, Driftwood appeared as a guest on the television game show, To Tell the Truth.

=== 1960s ===
For a time during the 1960s, Driftwood toured the United States and Europe with the Preservation Hall New Orleans jazz band, although as a separate act. Back home, he became a folklorist, establishing the Rackensack Folklore Society, an association of local folk singers and musicians, and began performing at the local county fair in Mountain View. Driftwood became interested in promoting Arkansas folk music and the local folk performers he knew in the area. He invited members of the Mountain View community to perform at a festival of his own devising. First held on April 19 and 20 of 1963, this festival grew over the years and transformed into the annual Arkansas Folk Festival, which would attract more than 100,000 people.

Driftwood helped establish the Ozark Folk Center to preserve Ozark Mountain culture. The Folk Center was later absorbed into the Arkansas State Park system and remains a popular tourist destination.

=== Environmental advocate ===
Driftwood became involved with environmental issues when the United States Army Corps of Engineers planned to dam the Buffalo River. He worked to defeat the plan, which ultimately resulted in the establishment of Buffalo National River. Driftwood had a major role in preserving Blanchard Springs Caverns, which later came under management of the United States Forest Service. He recorded the song still heard in the orientation film in the visitor center.

Driftwood was appointed to direct the Arkansas Parks and Tourism Commission for his environmental efforts. He was also named to the advisory committee of the Kennedy Center for the Performing Arts in Washington, DC. Due to his extensive knowledge of folk music, he was appointed as a musicologist for the National Geographic Society.

=== Later years ===
During his later life, Driftwood enjoyed performing free concerts for high-school and college students. He died of a heart attack on July 12, 1998, in Fayetteville, Arkansas, at age 91.
