= Flag, Arkansas =

Unincorporated community in Arkansas, US

Coordinates: 35°49′09″N 92°23′40″W

Flag is an unincorporated community in Stone County, Arkansas, United States.
