= Woodrow Store =

- U.S. National Register of Historic Places
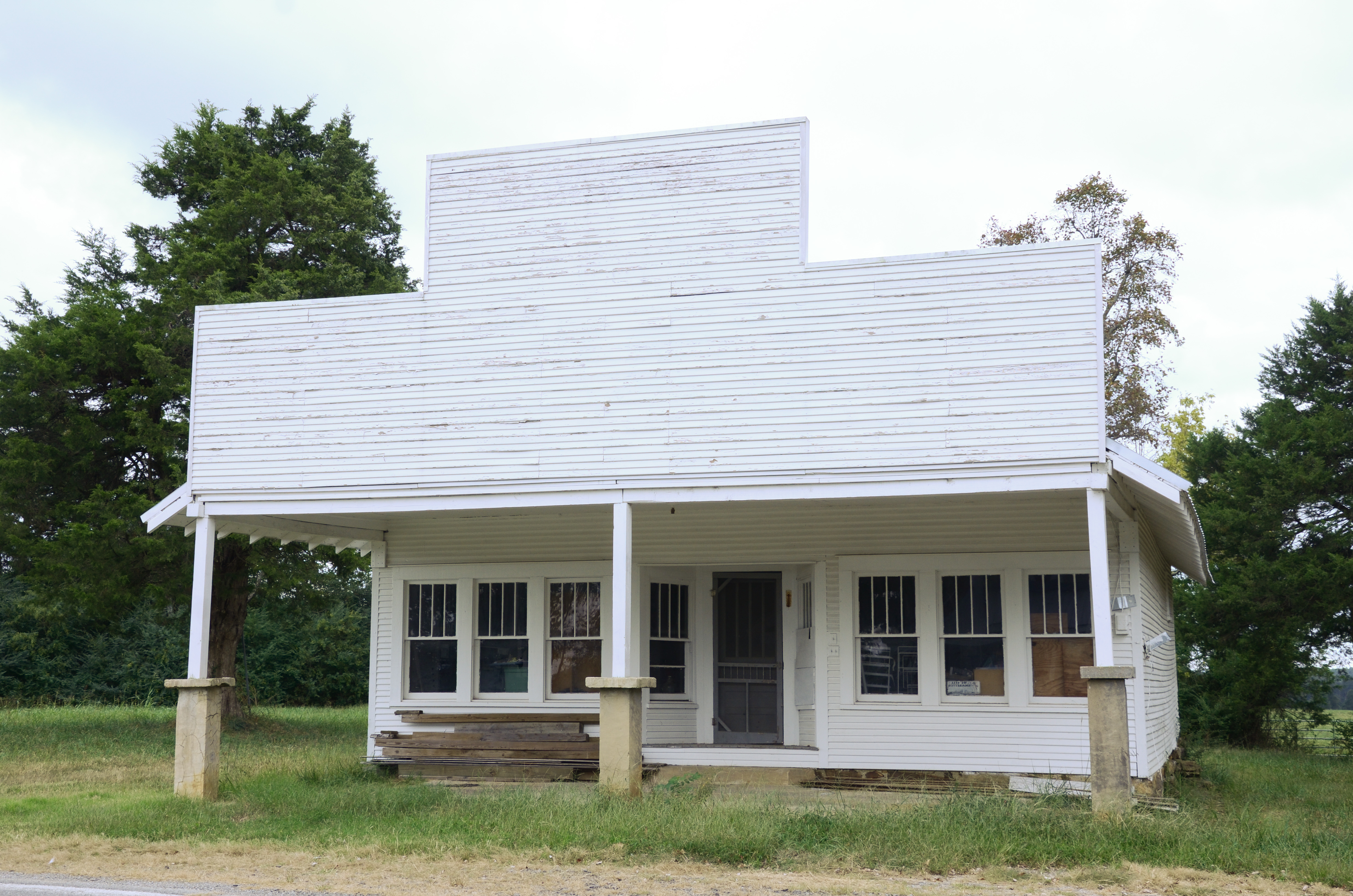

- Location within Arkansas Location within the United States
- Location: AR 263, Woodrow, Arkansas
- Coordinates: 35°39′47″N 92°4′48″W
- Area: less than one acre
- Built: 1927
- Architectural style: Bungalow/craftsman
- MPS: Arkansas Highway History and Architecture MPS
- NRHP reference No.: 00001592
- Added to NRHP: January 4, 2001

The Woodrow Store is a historic commercial building on Arkansas Highway 263 in rural northern Cleburne County, Arkansas. It is a modest single-story wood-frame building, set on the south side of the highway in the crossroads community of Woodrow. Built in 1927, it served as the only general store and automobile fuel service station for the isolated hill community for many years.

The building was listed on the National Register of Historic Places in 2001.

== See also ==
- National Register of Historic Places listings in Cleburne County, Arkansas
