= Turkey Creek School =

- U.S. National Register of Historic Places
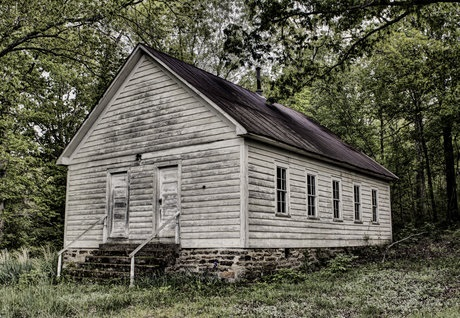

- Location within Arkansas Location within the United States
- Location: AR 9, Turkey Creek, Stone County, Arkansas
- Coordinates: 35°45′32″N 92°13′54″W
- Built: 1925
- Architect: George Green, Robert Hawkins
- NRHP reference No.: 85003396
- Added to NRHP: October 25, 1985

Turkey Creek School

Location
- AR 9 Stone County, Arkansas; United States

Information
- Opened: 1925
- Closed: 1949

Turkey Creek School is a former school building located along Arkansas Highway 9 in Stone County, Arkansas. It is a single-story wood-frame structure, with a metal gable roof, weatherboard siding, and a stone foundation. The north facade has a symmetrical pair of entrances with simple trim, and the sides have five sash windows. Although it was built in 1925, the school resembles much older rural schoolhouses. It was used as a school until 1949, and now serves as a local community building.

The building was listed on the National Register of Historic Places in 1985.

== See also ==
- National Register of Historic Places listings in Stone County, Arkansas
