= Newnata, Arkansas =

- Unincorporated community
- Location within Arkansas Location within the United States
- Coordinates: 35°53′22″N 92°15′07″W
- Country: United States
- State: Arkansas
- County: Stone
- Elevation: 617 ft (188 m)
- Time zone: UTC-6 (Central (CST))
  - Summer (DST): UTC-5 (CDT)
- Area code: 870
- GNIS feature ID: 72864

Newnata is an unincorporated community in Stone County, Arkansas, United States. It is in the Ozark Mountains region of the northern part of the state and is near the town of Mountain View.

== Overview ==
Newnata's zip code is currently 72680. The community used to have the zip code 72657 and was served by the small post office at Newnata which is no longer in operation. Before being named Newnata (New Birth) by the U.S. Postal Service, it was called "Crystal Hill". The Crystal Hill Cemetery is still in use.

Though designated a town, it receives no mail to any resident of "Newnata" but has been taken into the greater area served by the Timbo, Arkansas township. Thus, mail to the decentralized town is designated as "Timbo."

The town has no mayor and no city hall. While it used to have more activity in the late 19th century to the mid-20th century, Newnata has no economy other than a rural Ozark economy based on subsistence farming, cattle, and other livestock.

Several forks of the Sylamore Creek flow through the community. They are the north fork of Sylamore Creek, the Roasting Ear Creek which is the middle fork, and the South Fork of the Sylamore Creek which lies entirely on private lands. A natural spring called Spout Springs flows into the Roasting Ear Creek and originates east of the old township. The spring flows out of the hill by the side of the road approximately one mile east of the tire shop.

People in the area consist of descendants of original settlers and others "from off" as the people of Stone County refer to anyone not descended from early settlers.

There is no hub of activity in the Newnata today, but the most active area is the tire repair and sales shop located directly off Highway 66.

The area epitomizes the Ozark region in general. Nearby Mountain View is the "Folk Music Capital of the World." Nearly every family in the vicinity has stringed instruments, and many residents are proficient at a variety of traditional mountain instruments including the guitar, harmonica, dobro, upright bass, mandolin, fiddle, and banjo.
