= Big Flat, Arkansas =

- Town
- Location of Big Flat in Baxter and Searcy Counties, Arkansas.
- Coordinates: 36°0′10″N 92°24′24″W
- Country: United States
- State: Arkansas
- Counties: Baxter, Searcy

Area
  - Total: 1.07 sq mi (2.78 km^{2})
  - Land: 1.07 sq mi (2.76 km^{2})
  - Water: 0.0077 sq mi (0.02 km^{2})
- Elevation: 1,253 ft (382 m)

Population (2020)
  - Total: 88
  - Estimate (2025): 87 ▼
  - Density: 82.5/sq mi (31.85/km^{2})
- Time zone: UTC-6 (Central (CST))
  - Summer (DST): UTC-5 (CDT)
- ZIP code: 72617
- Area code: 870
- FIPS code: 05-05980
- GNIS feature ID: 2405261
- Website: cityofbigflatar.com

Big Flat is a town in Baxter and Searcy counties in the U.S. state of Arkansas. The population was 88 at the 2020 census.

== Geography ==
According to the United States Census Bureau, the town has a total area of 2.8 km^{2} (1.1 sq mi), of which 2.8 km^{2} (1.1 sq mi) is land and 0.93% is water.

=== List of highways ===
- Arkansas Highway 14
- Arkansas Highway 263

== Education ==
The Baxter County portion of Big Flat is served by the Mountain View School District. The small section in Searcy County is in the Searcy County School District.

It was served by the Big Flat School District until July 1, 1985, when it merged with the Fifty Six School District into the Tri-County School District. On July 1, 1993, the Tri-County district was dissolved, with portions going to various districts, including the Mountain View district and the Marshall School District. Marshall consolidated into the Searcy County district on July 1, 2004.

== Demographics ==
Historical population
Census	Pop.	Note	%±
1940	210		—
1950	197		−6.2%
1960	217		10.2%
1970	189		−12.9%
1980	150		−20.6%
1990	93		−38.0%
2000	104		11.8%
2010	105		1.0%
2020	88		−16.2%
2025 (est.)	87	▼	−1.1%
U.S. Decennial Census; 2014 Estimate

As of the census of 2000, there were 104 people, 49 households, and 24 families residing in the town. The population density was37.2 people /km^{2} (96 people/mi^{2}). There were 68 housing units at an average density of 24.3 units /km^{2} (63 units/mi^{2}). The racial makeup of the town was 100.00% White.

There were 49 households, out of which 20.4% had children under the age of 18 living with them, 36.7% were married couples living together, 8.2% had a female householder with no husband present, and 49.0% were non-families. 44.9% of all households were made up of individuals, and 28.6% had someone living alone who was 65 years of age or older. The average household size was 2.12 and the average family size was 3.08.

In the town, the population was spread out, with 22.1% under the age of 18, 7.7% from 18 to 24, 23.1% from 25 to 44, 24.0% from 45 to 64, and 23.1% who were 65 years of age or older. The median age was 40 years. For every 100 females, there were 116.7 males. For every 100 females age 18 and over, there were 113.2 males.

The median income for a household in the town was $21,094, and the median income for a family was $24,375. Males had a median income of $18,750 versus $61,250 for females. The per capita income for the town was $11,294. There were no families and 11.3% of the population living below the poverty line, including no under eighteens and 34.8% of those over 64.

== Notable people ==
- Robbie Branscum (1937–1997), author of children's books and young adult fiction
