= Timbo, Arkansas =

- Unincorporated community
- Location within Arkansas Location within the United States
- Coordinates: 35°52′15″N 92°19′02″W
- Country: United States
- State: Arkansas
- County: Stone
- Elevation: 853 ft (260 m)
- Time zone: UTC-6 (Central (CST))
  - Summer (DST): UTC-5 (CDT)
- ZIP code: 72680
- Area code: 870
- GNIS feature ID: 78559

Timbo is an unincorporated community in Stone County, Arkansas, United States. It is in the Ozark Mountains region of the northern part of the state and is near the town of Mountain View.

Timbo is known particularly for its strong tradition of old-time music. Music legend Jimmy Driftwood lived there. In 1959, Alan Lomax recorded music in Timbo (as well as in Heber Springs, Hughes, and Landis).

Timbo's ZIP code is 72680, although it previously used the ZIP code 72657, which was formerly served by the small post office at nearby Newnata (which is no longer in operation).

== Education ==
Public education is provided by Timbo Elementary School and Timbo High School, which are in the Mountain View School District.

Timbo and its schools were previously a part of the Stone County School District. On July 1, 2004, it consolidated with Rural Special School District into the existing Mountain View School District.
