= Harness, Arkansas =

Extinct town in Stone County, Arkansas, US

Coordinates: 35°50′35″N 92°24′20″W

Harness is an extinct town in Stone County, Arkansas, United States. The GNIS classifies it as a populated place.

A post office called Harness was established in 1922, and remained in operation until 1957. The origin of the name "Harness" is obscure.
