= Mountain View Waterworks =

- U.S. National Register of Historic Places
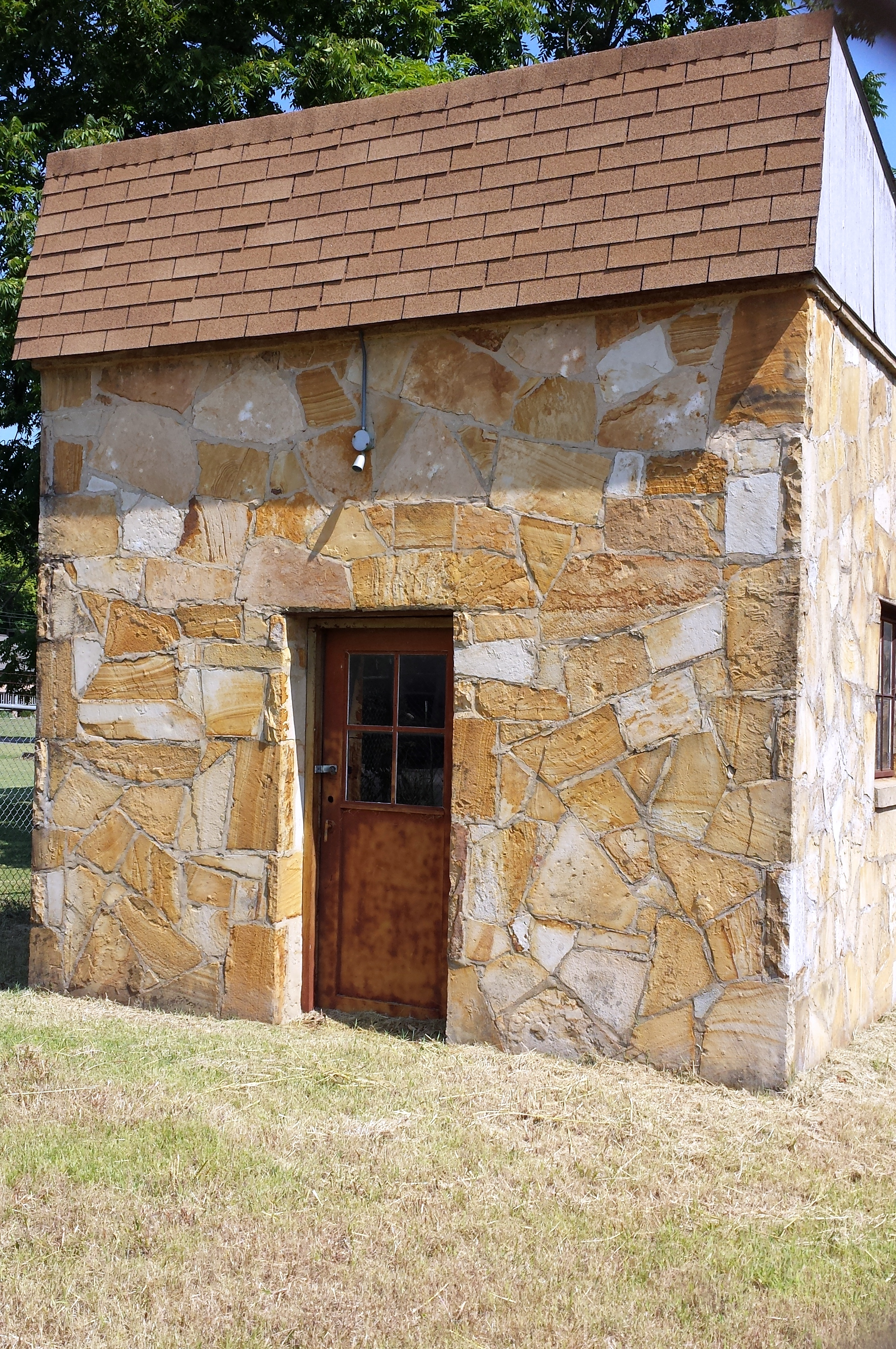
- The well house

- Location within Arkansas Location within the United States
- Location: Jct. of Gaylor St. and King St., Mountain View, Arkansas
- Coordinates: 35°52′22″N 92°7′10″W
- Area: less than one acre
- Built: 1936
- Built by: Public Works Administration
- MPS: New Deal Recovery Efforts in Arkansas MPS
- NRHP reference No.: 06000906
- Added to NRHP: October 5, 2006

The Mountain View Waterworks are a historic public water supply system in Mountain View, Arkansas. The facilities consist of a tower and well house, located at the junction of Gaylor and King Streets. The tower is a metal structure with four legs, reinforced by diagonal latticework members, topped by a water tank with a bowl-shaped bottom and a conical roof. A large pipe connects from the bottom of the tank to the well house, a square fieldstone structure. These facilities were built in 1936–37 with funding from the Public Works Administration, and were still in use at the time of the property's listing on the National Register of Historic Places in 2006.

== See also ==
- National Register of Historic Places listings in Stone County, Arkansas
