= Fox, Arkansas =

- Census-designated place
- Location within Arkansas Location within the United States
- Coordinates: 35°47′29″N 92°17′52″W
- Country: United States
- State: Arkansas
- County: Stone
- Elevation: 1,319 ft (402 m)

Population (2020)
  - Total: 237
- Time zone: UTC-6 (Central (CST))
  - Summer (DST): UTC-5 (CDT)
- ZIP code: 72051
- Area code: 870
- GNIS feature ID: 2805645

Fox is an unincorporated community and census-designated place (CDP) in Stone County, Arkansas, United States. It was first listed as a CDP in the 2020 census with a population of 237. Fox is located along Arkansas Highway 263, 21 miles (34 km) west-southwest of Mountain View. Fox has a post office with ZIP code 72051.

== History and geography ==
The town was officially established in 1905, when the post office was named Fox. However, early settlers to the area were in the community by the mid-1800s, with passage of the Homestead Act in 1861 making the area attractive to those who had the fortitude to survive as subsistence farmers on the hilly, rocky, heavily wooded terrain. Early settlers farmed at Meadowcreek or along the Little Red River, five to six miles away, before several families moved up the mountain to Fox.

== Demographics ==
Historical population
Census	Pop.	Note	%±
2020	237		—
U.S. Decennial Census; 2020

=== 2020 census ===
Fox CDP, Arkansas – Racial and ethnic composition Note: the US Census treats Hispanic/Latino as an ethnic category. This table excludes Latinos from the racial categories and assigns them to a separate category. Hispanics/Latinos may be of any race.
Race / Ethnicity (NH = Non-Hispanic)	Pop 2020	% 2020
White alone (NH)	237	92.41%
Black or African American alone (NH)	1	0.42%
Native American or Alaska Native alone (NH)	0	0.00%
Asian alone (NH)	0	0.00%
Pacific Islander alone (NH)	0	0.00%
Some Other Race alone (NH)	0	0.00%
Mixed Race or Multi-Racial (NH)	9	3.80%
Hispanic or Latino (any race)	8	3.38%
Total	237	100.00%

== Activism ==
The town was roused to defend the existence of its post office in 2011 when the USPS announced proposed closings. The community launched an all out campaign to save the post office, producing a YouTube video with locals telling their story. The town's campaign to keep their post office was featured in Seattle-based Equal Voice Newspaper which led to a New York Times article in December 2011. The USPS public meeting to gather public input was one of the best attended in Arkansas, with almost 200 residents present and representatives from Senator Boozman's and Congressman Crawford's offices present. After public pressure from rural residents around the country to their congressional delegation, the USPS proposed a compromise in May 2012 to leave all post offices open with reduced hours and non-career employees in most cases.

== Education ==
Fox is the home to Rural Special School, a part of the Mountain View School District, although the school is located 2 miles (3.2 km) away from the town center at 13237 Highway 263. The school serves a number of small communities on the isolated mountain including Fox, Meadowcreek, Mozart, Parma, Rushing, Sunnyland, and Turkey Creek. The K-12th grade school has between 200-220 students. The school's small size made it subject to Act 60 which required annexation or consolidation in July 2004 of all school districts in Arkansas with fewer than 350 students.

On July 1, 2004, the former Rural Special School District consolidated into the existing Mountain View School District.

Today the school is part of the Mountain View district but maintains its separate campus. Local residents have been champions of the school from its beginning in 1946 to the present. Much of the original campus was built by volunteer labor. Historic Old Main which is listed on the National Historic Register was built from materials collected by local veterans who helped dismantle structures at Camp Robinson in North Little Rock. The Turkey Creek Schoolhouse, built in 1925 and used until Rural Special School came into existence in 1946, is also listed on the National Register of Historic places. Today supporters fill the gym at ballgames, volunteer for projects, donate to fundraisers, and rally for the school when called to action. Students routinely perform high on standardized academic performance tests. The school hosts events for the community including a Senior Citizens Thanksgiving Dinner, that celebrated its 40th year in 2012, and an annual program to honor veterans. Students also provide musical performances at a Christmas Concert and at a Spring Variety Show. The school has an active Parent Teacher Organization that raises funds for programs of the school through an annual Fall Festival. Extracurricular activities of the school include BETA, FBLA, FFA, FCCLA, Spanish Club, Art Club, Quiz Bowl, Yearbook, basketball, baseball, softball, track, and golf. Starting in August 2013, Rural Educational Heritage Inc. began operating Little Fox Trotter Academy, an Arkansas Better Chance preschool for three- and four-year-old students in the Fox area.

== Religion ==
There are a number of churches in the Fox area: Fox Assembly of God, Skyland Baptist, Zion Baptist, Fox Unity Pentecostal, Trinity Pentecostal at Turkey Creek, Fox Church of Christ, Bethlehem General Baptist, Parma Full Gospel, and Antioch General Baptist at Rushing. Fox was the home of the first Catholic church in Stone County but the church since moved to the population center of the county at Mountain View. In recent years Fox area churches organized a joint revival with each night hosted at a different church and sermon delivered by a pastor of another local church. Local churches also produced a joint Christmas program in 2011. The Antioch Outreach Center at Rushing provides a food pantry distribution on the third Saturday of each month and hosts a blood drive every other month.

== Park and community center ==
The Fox Community Center is located a few blocks north of Fox. The former American Legion building has a large meeting room, kitchen, and bathrooms. Photos of over 200 area veterans surround the walls of the community center. The building may be rented for private celebrations, family reunions, etc. The Fox Park features playground equipment, basketball court, pavilion with picnic tables, bathrooms, softball/baseball field, and a paved walking track that circles the park. Since Fox is unincorporated, the two properties are owned by the county but managed by the Fox Community Services Committee.

== Towers ==
The altitude of Fox Mountain makes it attractive for tower locations. The first tower in the area was a fire tower erected by the Arkansas Forestry Commission at Rushing, on the hill near the intersection of Highway 9 and Highway 263. It is no longer in use and is privately owned. Within yards of that structure is a radio tower for KFFB whose station is located at Fairfield Bay. About a mile north of Fox at Mozart is a TV tower for AETN, Arkansas' public television station.
