= Fifty-Six, Arkansas =

- Town
- Location of Fifty-Six in Stone County, Arkansas
- Coordinates: 35°57′38″N 92°13′48″W
- Country: United States
- State: Arkansas
- County: Stone

Area
  - Total: 2.07 sq mi (5.36 km^{2})
  - Land: 2.07 sq mi (5.36 km^{2})
  - Water: 0.0039 sq mi (0.01 km^{2})
- Elevation: 889 ft (271 m)

Population (2020)
  - Total: 158
  - Estimate (2025): 163 ▲
  - Density: 76.4/sq mi (29.48/km^{2})
- Time zone: UTC-6 (Central (CST))
  - Summer (DST): UTC-5 (CDT)
- ZIP code: 72533
- Area code: 870
- FIPS code: 05-23680
- GNIS feature ID: 2403608

Fifty-Six is an incorporated town in Stone County, Arkansas, United States. As of the 2020 census, the city had a total population of 158, a decrease of 15 people from 2010.

== History ==
When founding the community in 1918, locals submitted the name "Newcomb" for the settlement. This request was rejected, and the federal government internally named the community for its school district number (156). It has frequently been noted on lists of unusual place names.

On March 14, 2025, an EF4 tornado struck the town at EF3 strength, heavily damaging or destroying several cabins at the Cedarwood Cabins, damaging other structures, and uprooting trees.

== Geography ==
Fifty-Six is located at 35°57′38″N 92°13′48″W. According to the United States Census Bureau, the city has a total area of 2.1 square miles (5.4 km^{2}), all land.

== Demographics ==
Historical population
Census	Pop.	Note	%±
1980	157		—
1990	156		−0.6%
2000	163		4.5%
2010	173		6.1%
2020	158		−8.7%
2025 (est.)	163	▲	3.2%
U.S. Decennial Census; 2014 Estimate

As of the census of 2000, there were 163 people, 71 households, and 51 families residing in the city. The population density was 79.1 inhabitants per square mile (30.5/km^{2}). There were 87 housing units at an average density of 42.2 units per square mile (16.3 units/km^{2}). The racial makeup of the city was 97.55% White and 2.45% Native American. 1.84% of the population were Hispanic or Latino of any race.

There were 71 households, out of which 25.4% had children under the age of 18 living with them, 64.8% were married couples living together, 7.0% had a female householder with no husband present, and 26.8% were non-families. 26.8% of all households were made up of individuals, and 12.7% had someone living alone who was 65 years of age or older. The average household size was 2.30 and the average family size was 2.69.

In the city, the population was spread out, with 19.0% under the age of 18, 8.6% from 18 to 24, 25.2% from 25 to 44, 30.7% from 45 to 64, and 16.6% who were 65 years of age or older. The median age was 44 years. For every 100 females, there were 96.4 males. For every 100 females age 18 and over, there were 91.3 males.

The median income for a household in the city was $34,375, and the median income for a family was $35,750. Males had a median income of $30,750 versus $19,063 for females. The per capita income for the city was $15,783. About 11.8% of families and 17.1% of the population were below the poverty line, including 17.2% of those under the age of 18 and 25.0% of those 65 and older.

== Education ==
Fifty-Six is in the Mountain View School District.

The community was served by the Fifty-Six School District until July 1, 1985, when it merged into the Big Flat School District to form the Tri-County School District. On July 1, 1993, the Tri-County School District was disestablished, with territory given to multiple districts, including Mountain View, which began serving Fifty-Six.

== Notable people ==
- Lee Hedges, football coach in Shreveport, Louisiana, born in Fifty-Six in 1929

== See also ==
- List of places with numeric names
