= Mountain View School District (Arkansas) =

School district in Arkansas, United States

Location
- 210 High School Drive; Mountain View, Arkansas 72560 United States

District information
- Grades: PK–12
- Accreditation: AdvancED
- Schools: 7
- NCES District ID: 0510200

Students and staff
- Students: 1,766
- Teachers: 140.47 (on FTE basis)
- Student–teacher ratio: 12.57

Other information
- Website: mountainviewschooldistrict.k12.ar.us

Mountain View School District is a public school district based in Mountain View, Arkansas, United States. The Mountain View School District provides early childhood, elementary and secondary education for more than 1,700 prekindergarten through grade 12 students at its seven facilities within Stone County, Arkansas.

It serves Mountain View, Fifty-Six, Fox, and Timbo. Small portions extend into Searcy County. Mountain View School District is accredited by the Arkansas Department of Education (ADE).

== History ==
On July 1, 1993 Tri-County School District was disestablished with territory given to multiple districts, including Mountain View. On July 1, 2004, the Stone County School District and the Rural Special School District consolidated into the Mountain View district.

== Schools ==
Secondary schools

- Timbo High School, serving grades 7 through 12 in Timbo.
- Rural Special High School, serving grades 7 through 12 in Fox.
- Mountain View High School, serving grades 9 through 12 in Mountain View.
- Mountain View Middle School, serving grades 6 through 8 in Mountain View.

Elementary schools

- Timbo Elementary School—grades pre-kindergarten through grade 6.
- Rural Special Elementary School—serving kindergarten through grade 6.
- Mountain View Elementary School—grades pre-kindergarten through grade 5.
