= Rushing (surname) =

Rushing is the surname of:

- Allison Jones Rushing (born 1982), American judge
- Byron Rushing (born 1942), American politician
- Dalton Rushing (born 2001), American baseball player
- Jimmy Rushing (1901–1972), American singer featured in Count Basie's Orchestra from 1935 to 1948
- John Rushing (1972–2020), American football coach
- Laurie Rushing (born 1968), American politician
- Marion Rushing (1936–2013), American football player
- Randy Rushing (born 1963), American politician
- Sandra Rushing, American basketball coach
- T. J. Rushing (born 1983), American football coach and former player
