= Rushing, Arkansas =

Unincorporated community in Arkansas, US

Coordinates: 35°44′07″N 92°15′53″W

Rushing is an unincorporated community in Stone County, Arkansas, United States.

== History ==
A post office called Rushing was established in 1882, and remained in operation until 1971. One Mr. Rushing, an early postmaster, gave the community his last name.

The Post office in Rushing, Arkansas was started by Ephraim Owen Rushing. He was born in Ozark, Illinois in 1839. He moved to Arkansas around 1871–72 with his wife Bashaba Elizabeth Holland and two sons, Phillip (born 1866) and Bruce (born 1870) in Illinois. Their third child, Marietta Asanath was born in Rushing, Arkansas in 1872 and a fourth child born in 1876 in Rushing named Madison (a son). It is believed the oldest son, Phillip, became post master after his father.
