= Rural Special School District =

Defunct school district in Arkansas, United States

Rural Special School District No. 2 was a school district headquartered in Fox in unincorporated Stone County, Arkansas. It operated Rural Special Elementary School (K-6) and Rural Special High School (7-12).

On July 1, 2004, it consolidated with Stone County School District into the existing Mountain View School District.
