= Ozark Folk Center =

Living history state park in Mountain View, Arkansas

The Ozark Folk Center is an Arkansas living history state park located in Mountain View, Arkansas, dedicated to preserving and presenting Ozark cultural heritage and tradition to the public.

== History ==
The University of Arkansas Cooperative Extension Service, in an early attempt to preserve the vanishing heritage of the Ozark Mountains, assisted local craftsmen and musicians to form the Ozark Foothills Crafts Guild in 1962. The guild started with 30 members and grew to a membership of over 300 master craftsmen and musicians.

In 1963 the guild, in cooperation with local civic organizations and education advocate Bessie Moore, organized the first Arkansas Folk Festival which attracted approximately 15,000 people. The festival became an annual event and within a few years was attracting almost 100,000 people to Mountain View. Because of the success of the annual festival the guild realized that they needed a permanent home.

The guild, in cooperation with local government, obtained a grant from the United States Economic Development Administration to establish a private commercial craft center at Mountain View. Prior to its opening in the Spring of 1973, the state of Arkansas recognized the potential of the project and folded the center into the state park system and provided additional funding.

The Ozark Folk Center produces the nationally distributed radio show Ozark Highlands Radio.

== Other area points of interest ==
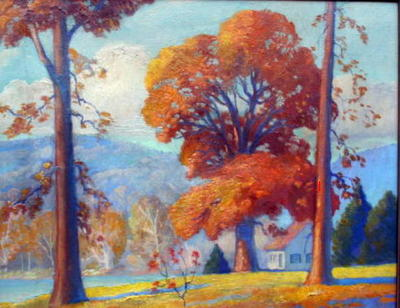
Ozark Landscape by Frank Nuderscher, 1920

Many visitors to the Ozark Folk Center also visit Blanchard Springs Caverns, float the Buffalo National River, or enjoy trout fishing on the White River, all of which are located in the Folk Center area.

The town of Mountain View bills itself as the "Folk Music Capital of the World" and local musicians often gather in small groups to play their instruments in the town square after dark during the summer months. Visitors have always been welcome to attend these impromptu free concerts and often bring their own lawn chairs. Food and drink are usually available from vendors on the square at these times.

== See also ==
- List of music museums
- List of Arkansas state parks
