= Mountain View, Arkansas =

- City
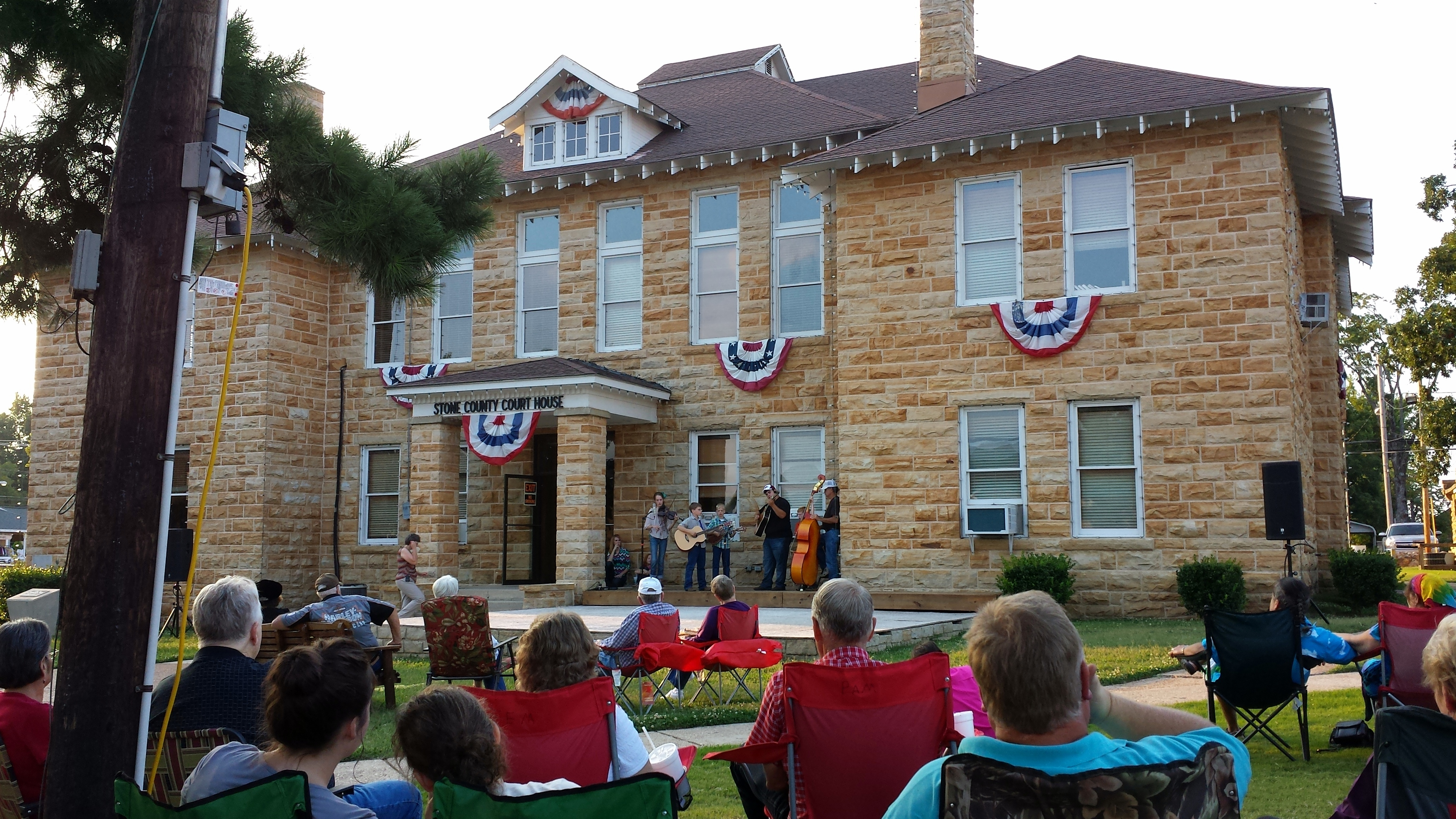
- Music on the steps of the Stone County Courthouse in Mountain View, August 2014
- Nickname: Folk Music Capital of the World
- Motto: "Your Place in the Mountains"
- Location of Mountain View in Stone County, Arkansas.
- Coordinates: 35°51′54″N 92°6′31″W
- Country: United States
- State: Arkansas
- County: Stone

Government
  - Mayor: Roger Gardner

Area
  - Total: 7.30 sq mi (18.91 km^{2})
  - Land: 7.30 sq mi (18.90 km^{2})
  - Water: 0.0039 sq mi (0.01 km^{2})
- Elevation: 755 ft (230 m)

Population (2020)
  - Total: 2,877
  - Estimate (2025): 2,940 ▲
  - Density: 394.3/sq mi (152.25/km^{2})
- Time zone: UTC-6 (Central (CST))
  - Summer (DST): UTC-5 (CDT)
- ZIP codes: 72533, 72560
- Area code: 870
- FIPS code: 05-47540
- GNIS feature ID: 2404333
- Website: www.cityofmtnviewarkansas.gov

Mountain View is the largest city in and the county seat of Stone County, Arkansas, United States, located in the Ozarks. As of the 2020 census, Mountain View had a population of 2,877. The city's economy is largely based on tourism related to its title as the "Folk Music Capital of the World". The city is also known for outdoors recreation opportunities including Blanchard Springs Caverns, trout fishing on the White River and the Ozark National Forest.

== History ==
The town's name is derived from its location in a valley bordered by the Blue Mountain Range of the Ozark Mountains. Mountain View was incorporated on August 14, 1890. Prior to the founding of Mountain View in 1890, the town of Riggsville, established in 1819 by Thomas Augustus Riggs, existed immediately to the east remaining until after the Civil War, when towns with southern sympathies were to be renamed or moved altogether.

An EF4 tornado caused major damage to the town on February 5, 2008, in the 2008 Super Tuesday tornado outbreak.

== Geography ==
Mountain View is located at 35°51′54″N 92°6′31″W (35.864886, −92.108497). According to the United States Census Bureau, the city has a total area of 6.8 square miles (17.7 km^{2}), of which 6.8 square miles (17.7 km^{2}) is land and 0.15% is water.

=== Climate ===
The climate in the area is characterized by hot, humid summers and generally mild to cool winters. According to the Köppen Climate Classification system, Mountain View has a humid subtropical climate, abbreviated "Cfa" on climate maps.

Climate data for Mountain View, Arkansas (1991–2020 normals, extremes 1962–present)
Month	Jan	Feb	Mar	Apr	May	Jun	Jul	Aug	Sep	Oct	Nov	Dec	Year
Record high °F (°C)	78 (26)	83 (28)	91 (33)	94 (34)	95 (35)	108 (42)	109 (43)	114 (46)	106 (41)	93 (34)	88 (31)	81 (27)	114 (46)
Mean maximum °F (°C)	69.3 (20.7)	73.5 (23.1)	80.0 (26.7)	84.9 (29.4)	88.6 (31.4)	94.3 (34.6)	99.0 (37.2)	99.3 (37.4)	95.9 (35.5)	87.7 (30.9)	76.8 (24.9)	69.8 (21.0)	101.2 (38.4)
Mean daily maximum °F (°C)	47.6 (8.7)	52.8 (11.6)	61.2 (16.2)	70.8 (21.6)	78.1 (25.6)	86.5 (30.3)	91.1 (32.8)	90.5 (32.5)	83.6 (28.7)	72.9 (22.7)	60.5 (15.8)	50.5 (10.3)	70.5 (21.4)
Daily mean °F (°C)	37.9 (3.3)	42.3 (5.7)	50.4 (10.2)	59.4 (15.2)	67.7 (19.8)	76.1 (24.5)	80.3 (26.8)	79.1 (26.2)	71.7 (22.1)	60.7 (15.9)	49.7 (9.8)	40.8 (4.9)	59.7 (15.4)
Mean daily minimum °F (°C)	28.3 (−2.1)	31.7 (−0.2)	39.7 (4.3)	48.0 (8.9)	57.3 (14.1)	65.8 (18.8)	69.5 (20.8)	67.7 (19.8)	59.7 (15.4)	48.6 (9.2)	39.0 (3.9)	31.1 (−0.5)	48.9 (9.4)
Mean minimum °F (°C)	9.3 (−12.6)	13.9 (−10.1)	19.6 (−6.9)	30.7 (−0.7)	39.8 (4.3)	52.1 (11.2)	59.0 (15.0)	56.0 (13.3)	42.6 (5.9)	30.4 (−0.9)	21.4 (−5.9)	15.2 (−9.3)	6.6 (−14.1)
Record low °F (°C)	−12 (−24)	−7 (−22)	7 (−14)	21 (−6)	32 (0)	42 (6)	49 (9)	42 (6)	30 (−1)	21 (−6)	8 (−13)	−9 (−23)	−12 (−24)
Average precipitation inches (mm)	3.49 (89)	3.41 (87)	4.99 (127)	5.64 (143)	5.63 (143)	3.81 (97)	3.82 (97)	3.88 (99)	3.54 (90)	4.26 (108)	5.11 (130)	4.30 (109)	51.88 (1,318)
Average snowfall inches (cm)	1.2 (3.0)	1.5 (3.8)	1.3 (3.3)	0.0 (0.0)	0.0 (0.0)	0.0 (0.0)	0.0 (0.0)	0.0 (0.0)	0.0 (0.0)	0.0 (0.0)	0.1 (0.25)	0.8 (2.0)	4.9 (12)
Average precipitation days (≥ 0.01 in)	7.1	6.6	9.2	8.2	10.0	7.7	8.2	7.1	6.2	7.1	7.5	7.2	92.1
Average snowy days (≥ 0.1 in)	0.6	0.6	0.3	0.0	0.0	0.0	0.0	0.0	0.0	0.0	0.1	0.5	2.1
Source: NOAA

== Demographics ==
Historical population
Census	Pop.	Note	%±
1880	99		—
1900	226		—
1910	272		20.4%
1920	342		25.7%
1930	458		33.9%
1940	745		62.7%
1950	1,043		40.0%
1960	983		−5.8%
1970	1,866		89.8%
1980	2,147		15.1%
1990	2,439		13.6%
2000	2,876		17.9%
2010	2,748		−4.5%
2020	2,877		4.7%
2025 (est.)	2,940	▲	2.2%
U.S. Decennial Census

=== 2020 census ===
As of the 2020 census, Mountain View had a population of 2,877. There were 540 families residing in the city.

The median age was 51.9 years. 18.5% of residents were under the age of 18 and 32.0% of residents were 65 years of age or older. For every 100 females there were 84.2 males, and for every 100 females age 18 and over there were 78.7 males age 18 and over.

0.0% of residents lived in urban areas, while 100.0% lived in rural areas.

There were 1,287 households in Mountain View, of which 21.6% had children under the age of 18 living in them. Of all households, 40.0% were married-couple households, 18.7% were households with a male householder and no spouse or partner present, and 38.4% were households with a female householder and no spouse or partner present. About 39.9% of all households were made up of individuals and 23.0% had someone living alone who was 65 years of age or older.

There were 1,613 housing units, of which 20.2% were vacant. The homeowner vacancy rate was 6.2% and the rental vacancy rate was 10.1%.

Mountain View racial composition
Race	Number	Percentage
White (non-Hispanic)	2,641	91.8%
Black or African American (non-Hispanic)	12	0.42%
Native American	17	0.59%
Asian	13	0.45%
Other/Mixed	126	4.38%
Hispanic or Latino	68	2.36%

=== 2000 census ===
As of the census of 2000, there were 2,876 people, 1,287 households, and 792 families residing in the city. The population density was 421.8 inhabitants per square mile (162.9/km^{2}). There were 1,450 housing units at an average density of 212.7 per square mile (82.1/km^{2}). The racial makeup of the city was 96.97% White, 0.94% Native American, 0.03% Pacific Islander, 0.31% from other races, and 1.74% from two or more races. 1.70% of the population were Hispanic or Latino of any race.

There were 1,287 households, out of which 23.8% had children under the age of 18 living with them, 50.7% were married couples living together, 9.2% had a female householder with no husband present, and 38.4% were non-families. 35.7% of all households were made up of individuals, and 19.0% had someone living alone who was 65 years of age or older. The average household size was 2.13 and the average family size was 2.72. In the city, the population was spread out, with 20.2% under the age of 18, 7.2% from 18 to 24, 20.7% from 25 to 44, 26.3% from 45 to 64, and 25.7% who were 65 years of age or older. The median age was 47 years. For every 100 females, there were 81.1 males. For every 100 females aged 18 and over, there were 80.3 males.

The median income for a household in the city was $19,302, and the median income for a family was $27,589. Males had a median income of $20,000 versus $16,790 for females. The per capita income for the city was $17,375. About 10.2% of families and 17.0% of the population were below the poverty line, including 19.1% of those under age 18 and 11.7% of those age 65 or over.

== Economy ==
The local economy is largely tourism-based. Numerous hotels and restaurants exist to serve travelers who come to visit the nearby Blanchard Springs Caverns, in Fifty-Six, Arkansas. The Ozark Folk Center State Park, and Loco Ropes Treetop Adventure Park. Many others seek the world-renowned trout fishing of the White River, or excellent camping, hiking, and mountain-biking that is found in the Ozark National Forest. A few live music and variety shows, such as the White River Hoedown, also entertain travelers by mixing contemporary country, gospel, and bluegrass music with a bit of local humor. However, the majority of visitors to Mountain View come to attend one of the two major festivals held here every year, and to enjoy the impromptu folk music jam sessions that occur around the courthouse square.

The remainder of the local economy consists mostly of agriculture, specifically the farming of livestock, primarily cattle and chickens. Large-scale industrial activities in the area are overall nonexistent, excepting a few small manufacturing companies. The Stone County Iron Works, a nationally known company that produces iron furniture, fixtures and housewares, is headquartered in Mountain View. Recently, the city has seen expansion of its personal aircraft maintenance and repair industry. Stone County, along with four of six neighboring Arkansas counties, is a dry county.

== Arts and culture ==
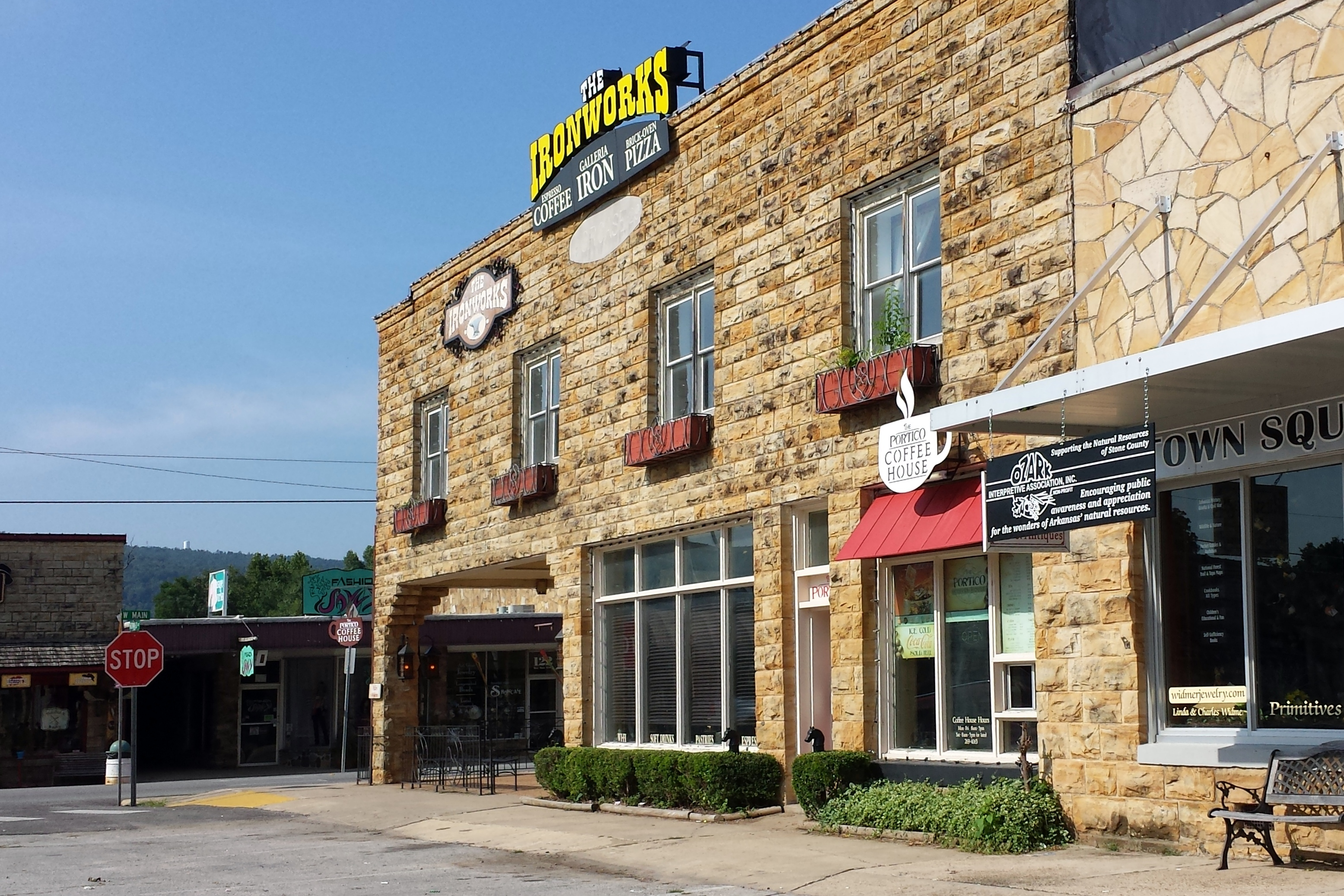
Much of downtown Mountain View's original buildings are built using native stone, giving the courthouse square a distinctive look and feel

=== Annual cultural events ===
Local festivals play an integral part in Mountain View's economy and culture, and the city is widely known throughout the country for its hospitality, uniqueness and relaxed pace of life. As such, thousands of people travel to Mountain View each year to attend one of these events and get a taste of Ozark Mountain culture. Often lodging must be secured a year in advance of the two major festivals. Some local estimates say that the city's population has grown to as much as 100,000 during past festivals, though this is likely an exaggeration. Average festival attendance tends to fall between 40,000 and 60,000.

In April, the city hosts the Arkansas Folk Festival. A highlight of this festival is an old-fashioned "home-town" parade, which brings out school bands, patriotic veterans groups, show horses, and decorated floats. Numerous folk craft vendors and many impromptu performances of live folk music are also part of the celebration. During the spring, summer and fall, anytime the weather is nice, people from all over will gather in and around the courthouse square to play and listen to music. Bluegrass mostly, but a wide array of folk, swing, country and gospel can be heard performed by local townsfolk as well as pickers from hundreds of miles away. A few dedicated musicians play only the old-time tunes that have been passed down through generations.

During the fourth weekend of October, thousands attend the Arkansas Bean Fest and Great Championship Outhouse Races. Early Saturday morning, nearly one ton of pinto beans are cooked in large, antique iron kettles set up along the west side of the courthouse square. Promptly at noon, a couple thousand pounds of pinto beans and cornbread are served to the gathered crowd. The festival continues with the famous Outhouse Race. Local teams (and anyone who else who wishes to haul in an entry) push outhouses built on wheels (similar to a go-kart) in a series of races. The overall champion receives the coveted Golden Toilet Seat Trophy. Handmade crafts and folk music play an integral part in this festival as well. Other local festivals include the Mountain View Bluegrass Festival, held in both mid-March and mid-November; An Old-Fashioned Fourth of July; and Mountains Music & Motorcycles in August. The town gets into the holiday spirit each year by lighting downtown buildings for Christmas open house events, and an annual Christmas tree lighting on the first Saturday in December.

The Ozark Folk Center plays host to several events throughout the year, including live concerts by well-known artist such as the Old Crow Medicine Show and Del McCoury, the Arkansas State Fiddle Championships, and workshops teaching banjo, dulcimer, and other folk crafts.

== Education ==
The city hosts a satellite campus of Ozarka College, a two-year institution whose main campus is located in Melbourne, Arkansas. The city is also home to the main campus of the Mountain View School District, a secondary school that also maintains campuses in Timbo, Arkansas and Fox, Arkansas. The school district boundaries are the same as those of Stone County, Arkansas.

== Notable people ==
- Jimmy Driftwood (1907–1998), folk songwriter and musician; born in Timbo, Arkansas near Mountain View
- Missy Irvin (born 1971), Republican member of the Arkansas State Senate from Mountain View
- Dick Powell (1904–1963), singer, actor, film producer, director and studio boss (co-founder of Four Star Television); born in Mountain View
- Harold M. Sherman (1898-1987), author, psychic researcher, and producer; lived in Mountain View

== Gallery ==
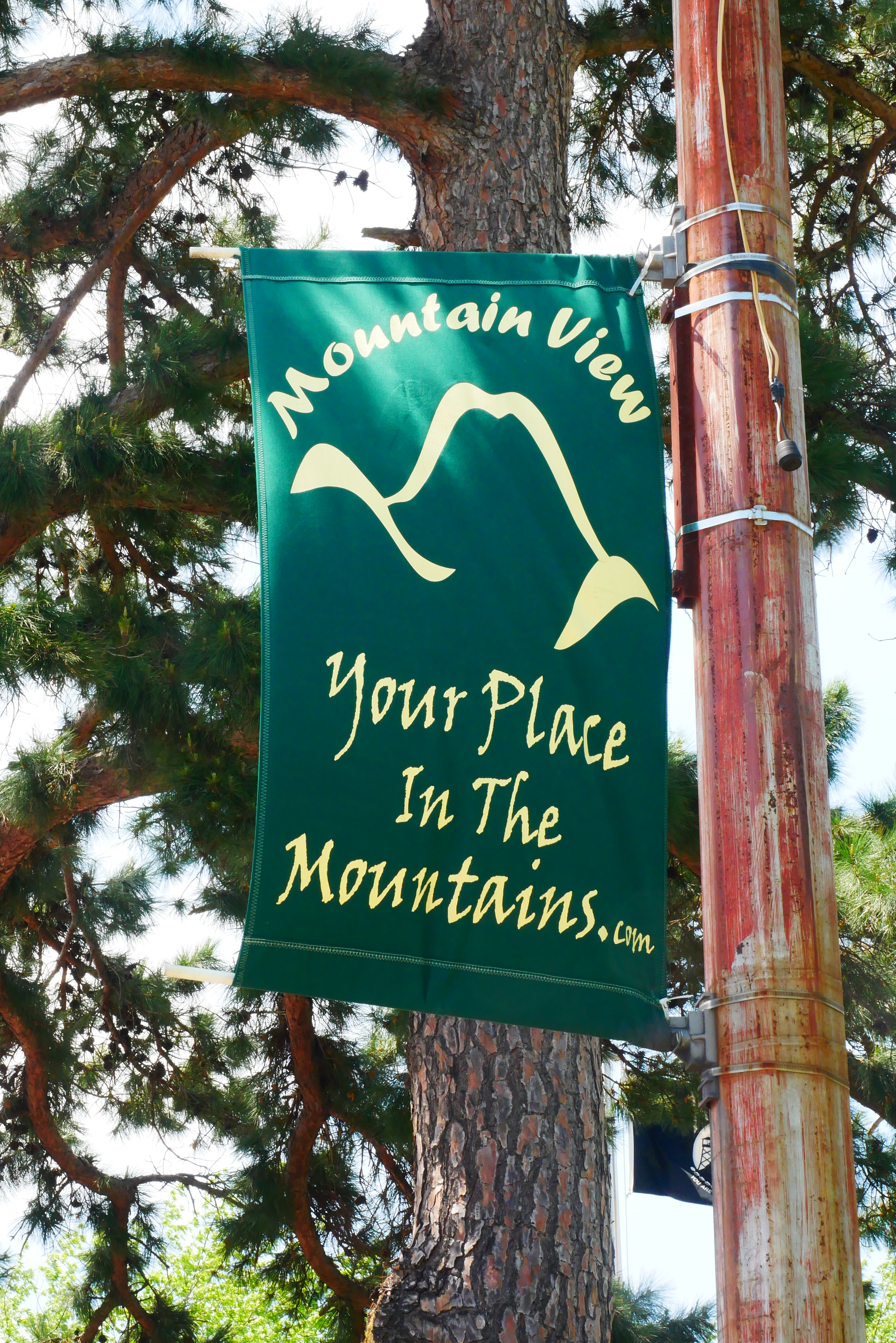
Mountain View flag

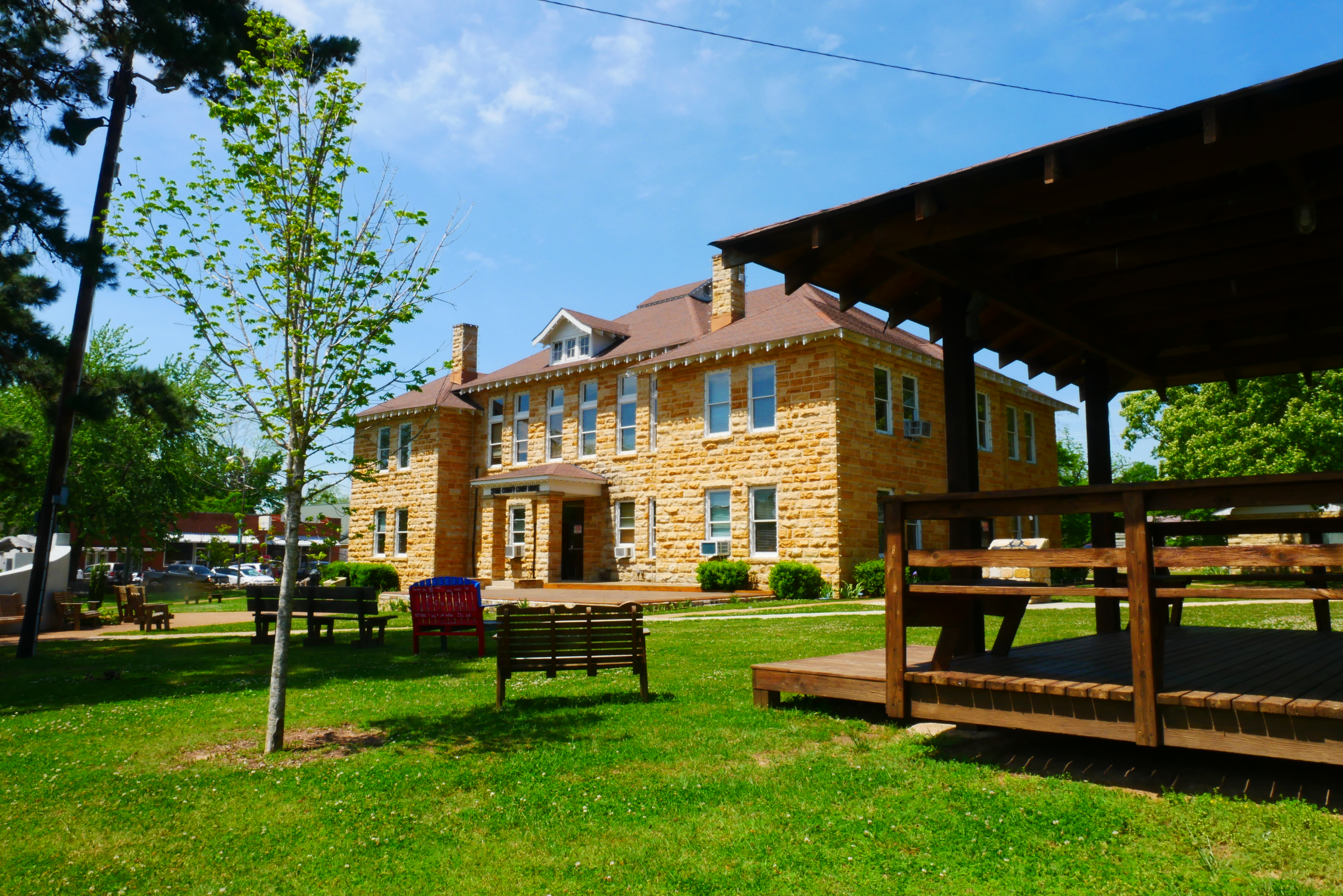
Mountain View Courthouse

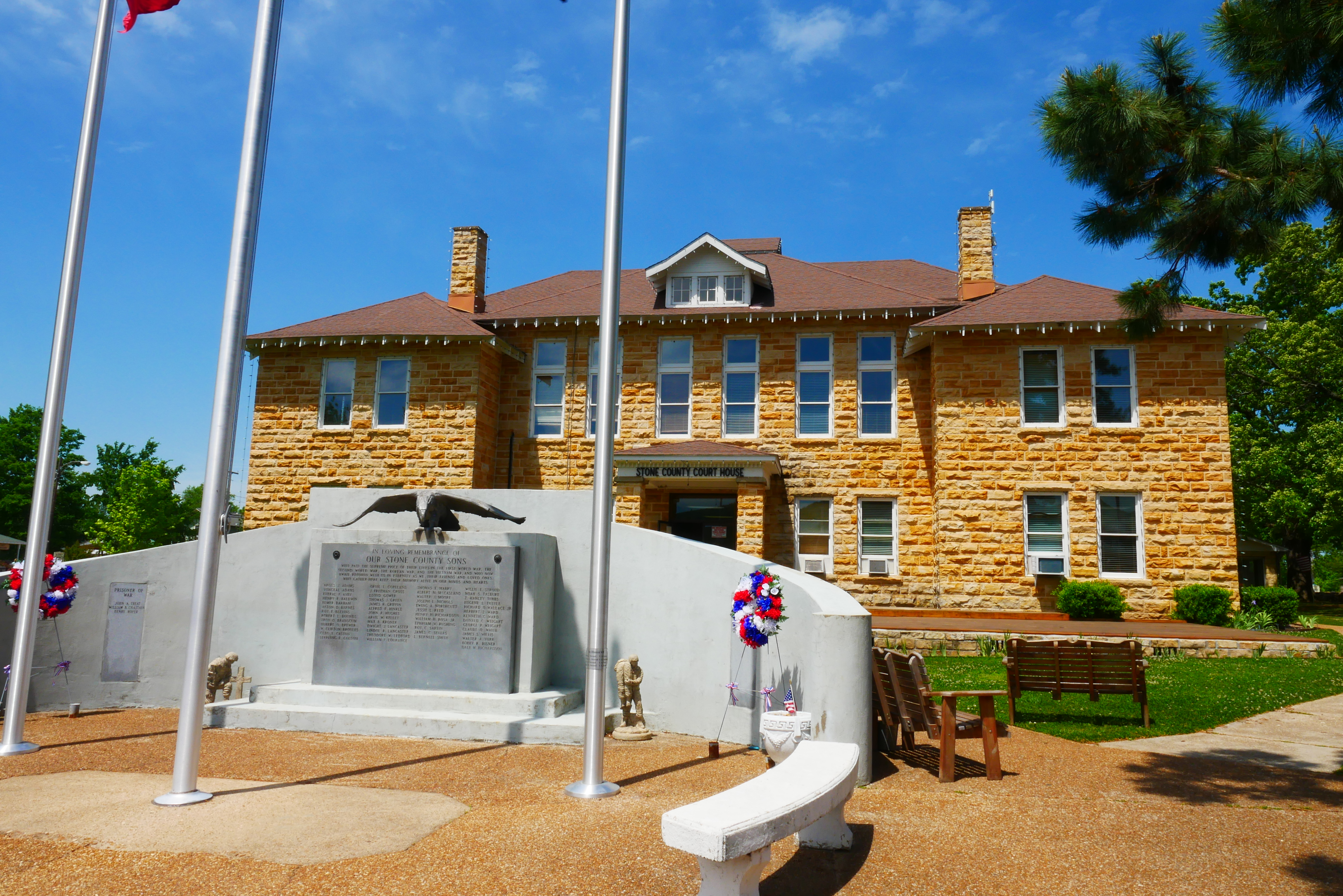
Mountain View Courthouse with Veteran Memorial

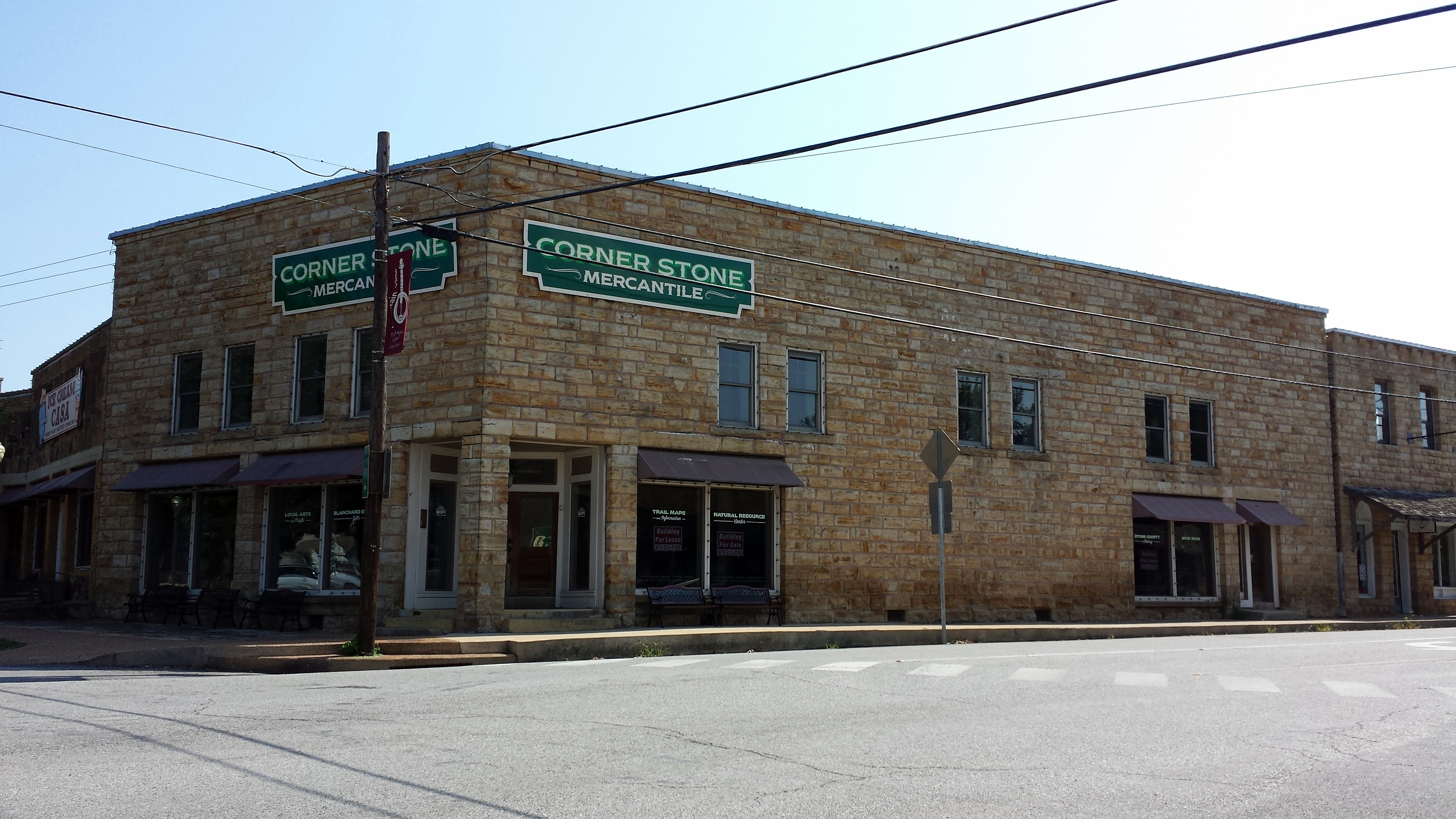
1924 stone commercial building

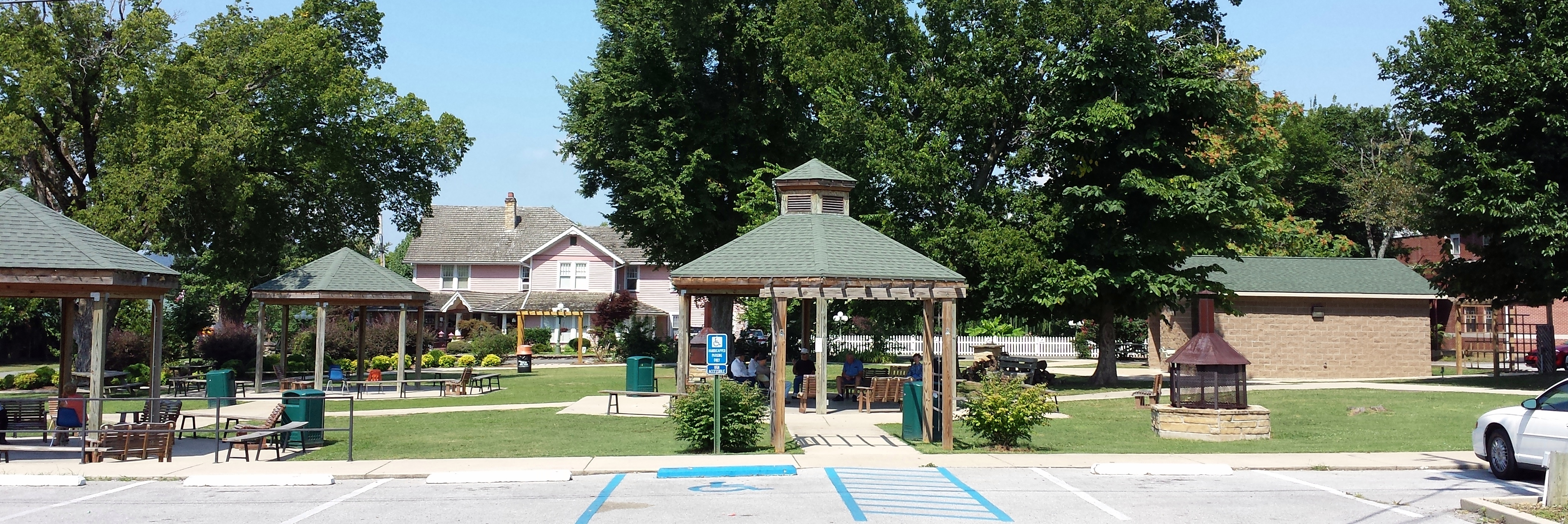
Washington Street Park

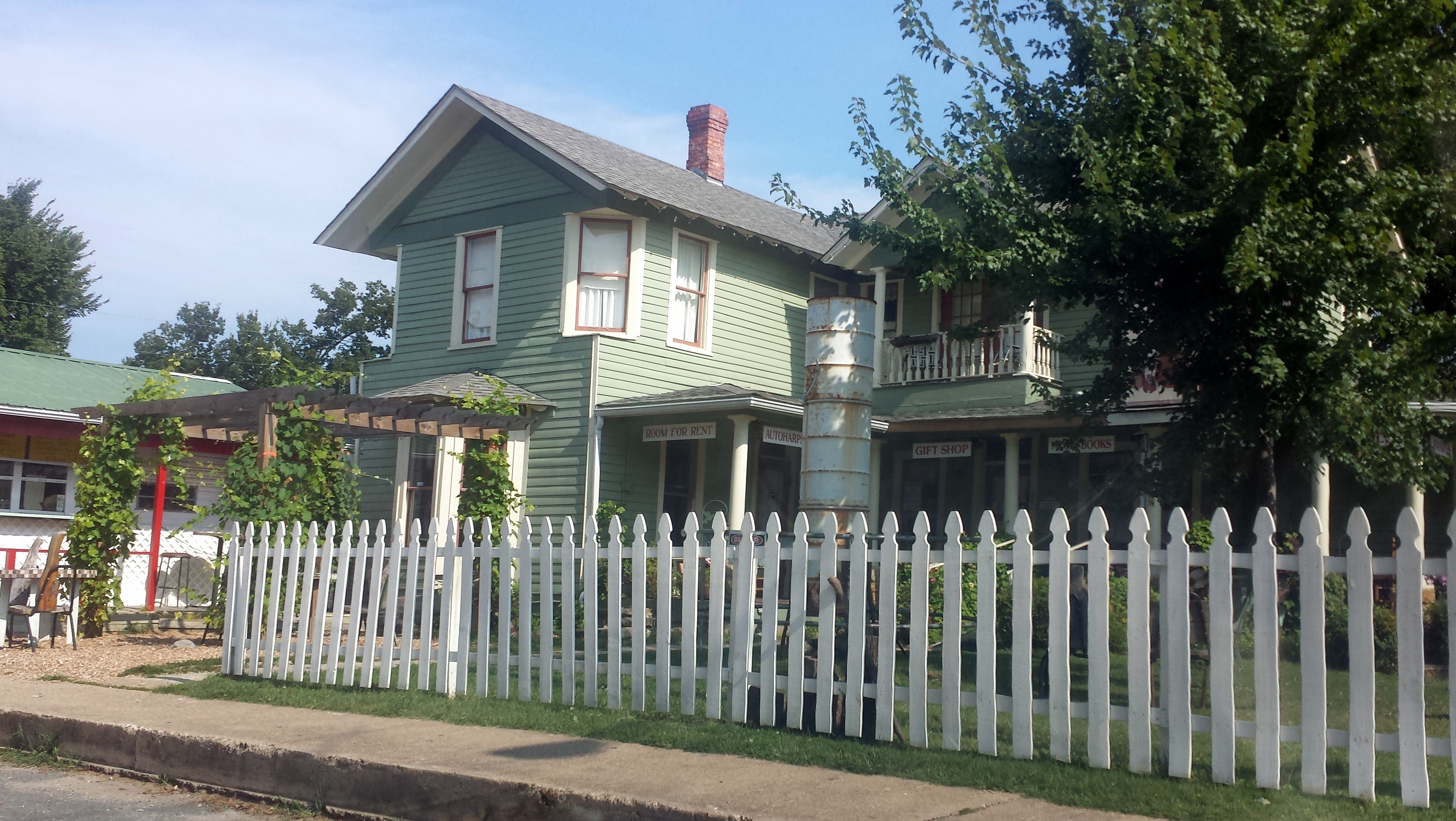
1915 home of Mountain View businessman and civic leader

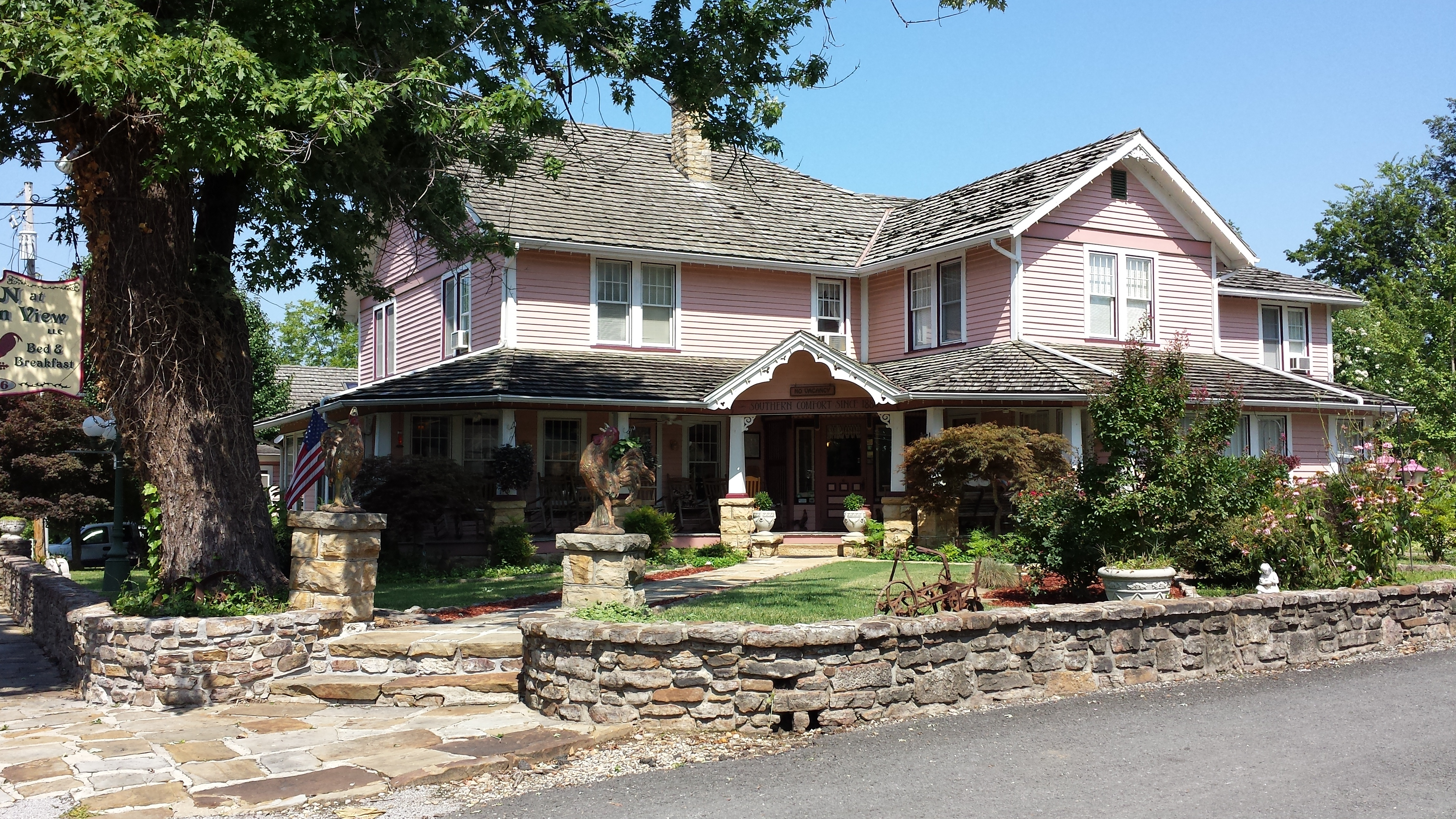
Craftsman hotel, ca. 1920

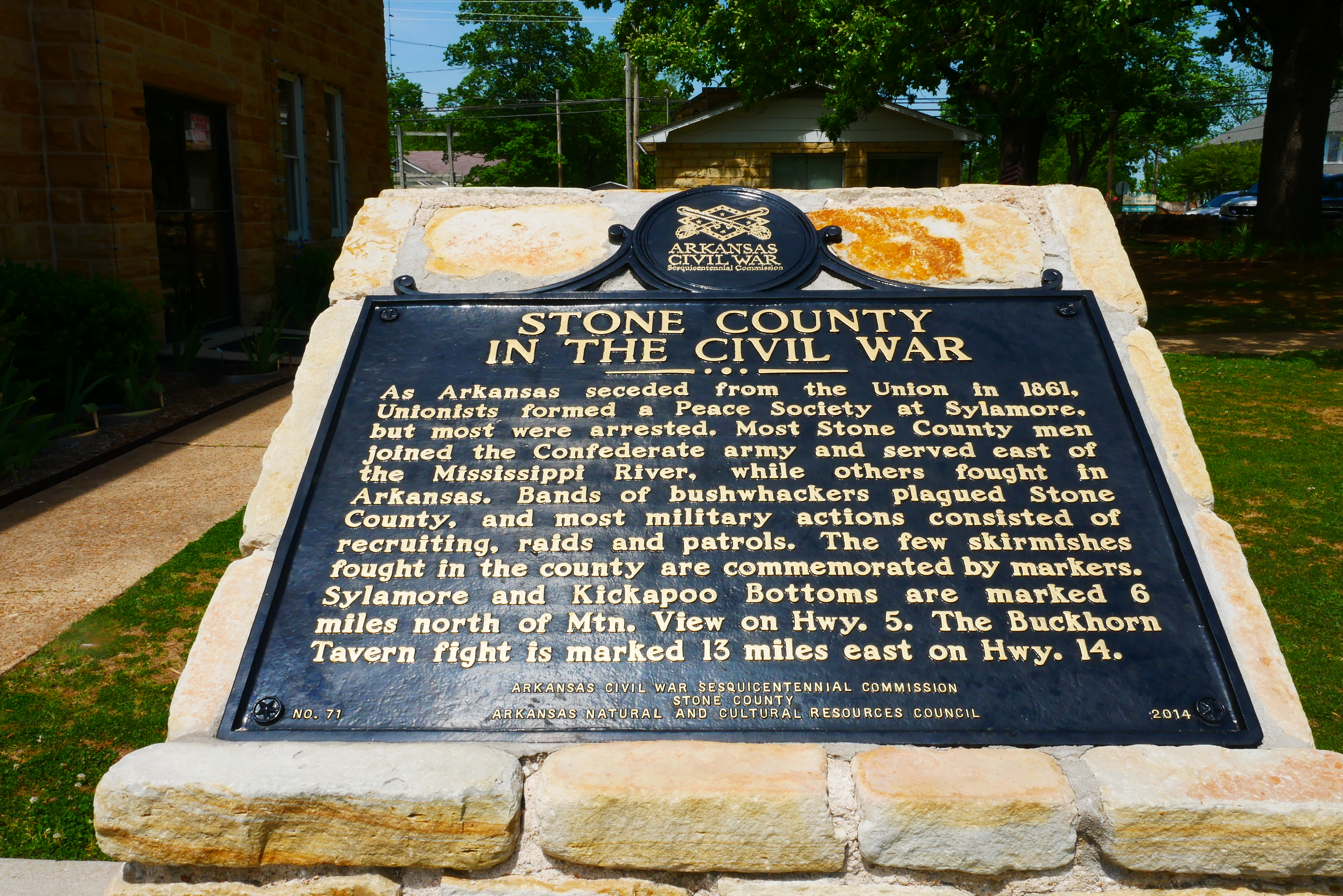
Stone County Civil War marker
