= Stone County, Arkansas =

County in Arkansas, United States

- County
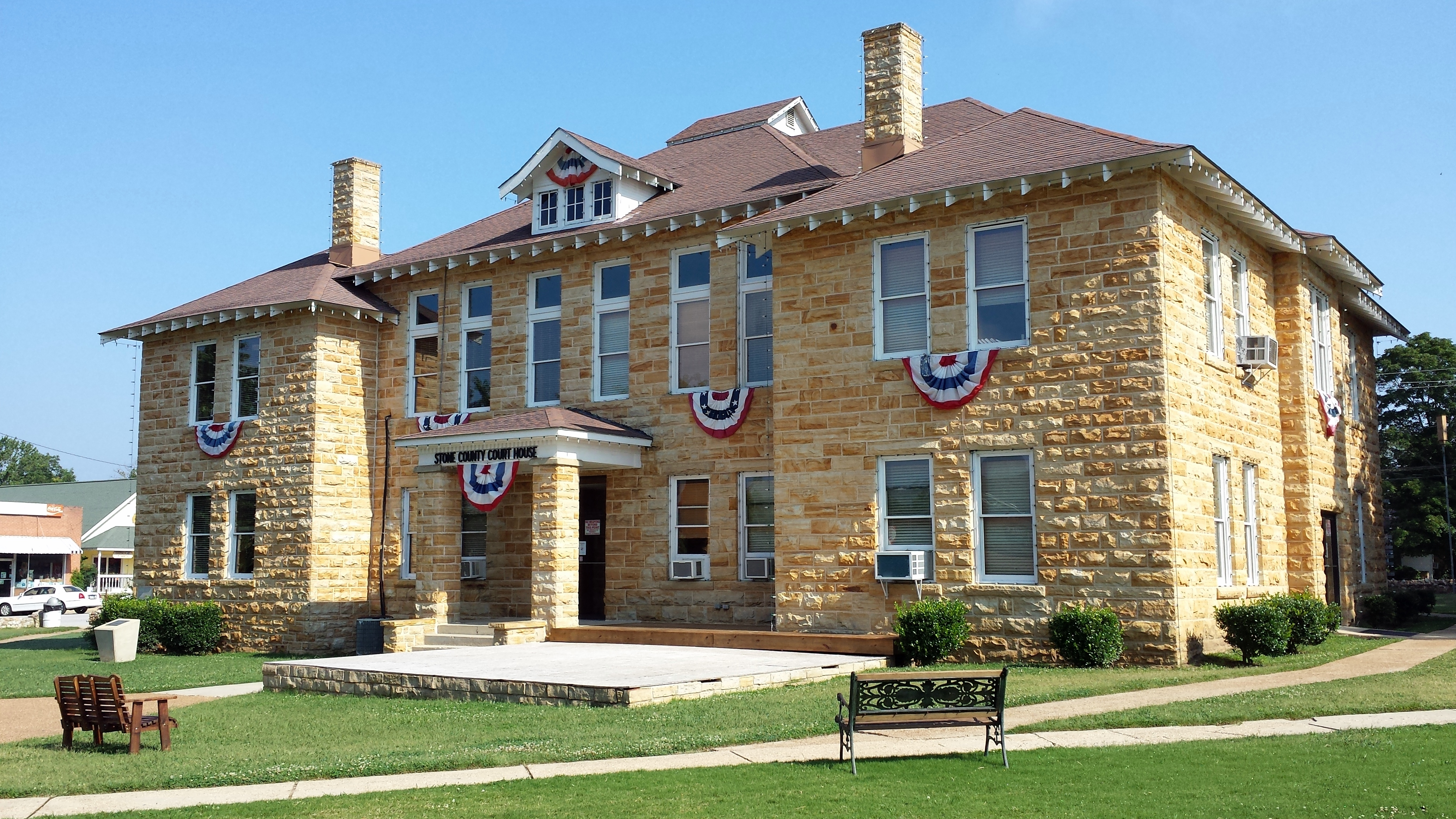
- Stone County Courthouse in Mountain View

- Location within the U.S. state of Arkansas
- Coordinates: 35°52′46″N 92°08′50″W
- Country: United States
- State: Arkansas
- Founded: April 21, 1873
- Named for: rock formations in the area
- Seat: Mountain View
- Largest city: Mountain View

Area
  - Total: 609.43 sq mi (1,578.4 km^{2})
  - Land: 606.59 sq mi (1,571.1 km^{2})
  - Water: 2.84 sq mi (7.4 km^{2}) 0.5%

Population (2020)
  - Total: 12,359
  - Estimate (2025): 12,703 ▲
  - Density: 20.375/sq mi (7.8667/km^{2})
- Time zone: UTC−6 (Central)
  - Summer (DST): UTC−5 (CDT)
- Congressional district: 1st
- Website: www.stonecountyar.gov

Stone County is located in the Ozark Mountains in the U.S. state of Arkansas. The county is named for the rugged, rocky area terrain of the Ozarks. Created as Arkansas's 74th county on April 21, 1873, Stone County has two incorporated cities: Mountain View, the county seat and most populous city, and Fifty-Six. The county is also the site of numerous unincorporated communities and ghost towns.

Most of the county is sparsely populated forested Ozark hills; including the northern fifth of the county managed by the United States Forest Service as the Ozark National Forest. The remainder of the county is used for poultry, ranching, and timber production. The White River runs along the eastern boundary of Stone County. The county contains six protected areas in addition to the Ozark National Forest: Blanchard Springs Caverns within the Ozark National Forest, two Natural Areas, two Wildlife Management Areas and the Ozark Folk Center, which preserves and interprets Ozark cultural heritage, especially traditional mountain folk music and crafts. Other features such as log cabins, one-room school houses, community centers, and museums, as well as annual cultural events, preserve the history and culture of Stone County.

Stone County occupies 609.43 square miles (1,578.4 km^{2}) and contained a population of 12,359 as of the 2020 Census.

== Geography ==
Stone County is located in the Ozark Mountains, one of the six ecoregions of Arkansas. The Ozarks are a mountainous subdivision of the U.S. Interior Highlands, and Stone County contains the Springfield Plateau, Salem Plateau, and the relatively steeper Boston Mountains subsets. The county is roughly split along an east–west line near Mountain View, the centrally located county seat, with areas north within the Springfield Plateau, and areas south within the Boston Mountains. Areas along the White River, which forms the county's northeastern boundary, are dissected bluffs of the Salem Plateau rather than riparian floodplains. According to the U.S. Census Bureau, the county has a total area of 609.43 square miles (1,578.4 km^{2}), of which 606.59 square miles (1,571.1 km^{2}) is land and 2.84 square miles (7.4 km^{2}) (0.5%) is water.

The county is located approximately 105 miles (169 km) north of Little Rock, 151 miles (243 km) northwest of Memphis, Tennessee, and 278 miles (447 km) southwest of St. Louis, Missouri. (Note: Mileages from Stone County to Little Rock, Memphis, and St. Louis are based on highway miles using county seat Mountain View for Stone County.) Stone County is surrounded by three Ozark counties, Searcy County to the west, Baxter County to the northwest, Izard County to the northeast, and three border counties with the Arkansas River Valley, Van Buren County to the southwest, Cleburne County to the south, and Independence County (which also contains a small piece of the Arkansas Delta) to the east.

=== National protected area ===
- Ozark National Forest (part)

== Demographics ==
Historical population
Census	Pop.	Note	%±
1880	5,089		—
1890	7,043		38.4%
1900	8,100		15.0%
1910	8,946		10.4%
1920	8,779		−1.9%
1930	7,993		−9.0%
1940	8,603		7.6%
1950	7,662		−10.9%
1960	6,294		−17.9%
1970	6,838		8.6%
1980	9,022		31.9%
1990	9,775		8.3%
2000	11,499		17.6%
2010	12,394		7.8%
2020	12,359		−0.3%
2025 (est.)	12,703	▲	2.8%
U.S. Decennial Census; 1790–1960 1900–1990; 1990–2000 2010

=== 2020 census ===
As of the 2020 census, the county had a population of 12,359. The median age was 49.8 years. 20.1% of residents were under the age of 18 and 27.3% of residents were 65 years of age or older. For every 100 females there were 95.9 males, and for every 100 females age 18 and over there were 93.6 males age 18 and over.

The racial makeup of the county was 93.0% White, 0.2% Black or African American, 0.8% American Indian and Alaska Native, 0.2% Asian, <0.1% Native Hawaiian and Pacific Islander, 0.7% from some other race, and 5.1% from two or more races. Hispanic or Latino residents of any race comprised 2.2% of the population.

<0.1% of residents lived in urban areas, while 100.0% lived in rural areas.

There were 5,333 households in the county, of which 23.9% had children under the age of 18 living in them. Of all households, 50.6% were married-couple households, 18.9% were households with a male householder and no spouse or partner present, and 25.6% were households with a female householder and no spouse or partner present. About 31.3% of all households were made up of individuals and 17.2% had someone living alone who was 65 years of age or older.

There were 6,784 housing units, of which 21.4% were vacant. Among occupied housing units, 75.9% were owner-occupied and 24.1% were renter-occupied. The homeowner vacancy rate was 3.3% and the rental vacancy rate was 9.9%.

=== 2010 census ===
As of the 2010 census, there were 12,394 people, 5,325 households, and 3,590 families residing in the county. The population density was 20 people per square mile (7.7 people/km^{2}). There were 6,712 housing units at an average density of 11 units per square mile (4.2 units/km^{2}). The racial makeup of the county was 96.8% White, 0.1% Black or African American, 0.7% Native American, 0.4% Asian, 0.0% Pacific Islander, 0.4% from other races, and 1.6% from two or more races. 1.3% of the population were Hispanic or Latino of any race.

There were 5,325 households, out of which 26.0% had children under the age of 18 living with them, 67.4% were married couples living together, 7.2% had a female householder with no husband present, and 32.6% were non-families. 28.9% of all households were made up of individuals, and 36.6% had someone living alone who was 65 years of age or older. The average household size was 2.30 and the average family size was 2.81.

In the county, the population was spread out, with 20.6% under the age of 18, 6.2% from 18 to 24, 19.4% from 25 to 44, 31.0% from 45 to 64, and 22.8% who were 65 years of age or older. The median age was 37.2 years. For every 100 females there were 97.8 males. For every 100 females age 18 and over, there were 96.2 males.

The median income for a household in the county was $30,380, and the median income for a family was $36,765. Males had a median income of $28,258 versus $25,341 for females. The per capita income for the county was $16,090. About 16.6% of families and 23.4% of the population were below the poverty line, including 35.7% of those under age 18 and 20.6% of those age 65 or over.

=== 2000 census ===
As of the 2000 census, there were 11,499 people, 4,768 households, and 3,461 families residing in the county. The population density was 19 people per square mile (7.3 people/km^{2}). There were 5,715 housing units at an average density of 9 units per square mile (3.5 units/km^{2}). The racial makeup of the county was 97.27% White, 0.08% Black or African American, 0.77% Native American, 0.05% Asian, 0.03% Pacific Islander, 0.15% from other races, and 1.64% from two or more races. 1.08% of the population were Hispanic or Latino of any race.

There were 4,768 households, out of which 26.90% had children under the age of 18 living with them, 62.30% were married couples living together, 7.10% had a female householder with no husband present, and 27.40% were non-families. 24.80% of all households were made up of individuals, and 11.20% had someone living alone who was 65 years of age or older. The average household size was 2.38 and the average family size was 2.82.

In the county, the population was spread out, with 22.20% under the age of 18, 7.10% from 18 to 24, 23.60% from 25 to 44, 28.50% from 45 to 64, and 18.60% who were 65 years of age or older. The median age was 43 years. For every 100 females there were 96.90 males. For every 100 females age 18 and over, there were 95.30 males.

The median income for a household in the county was $22,209, and the median income for a family was $28,009. Males had a median income of $20,904 versus $16,118 for females. The per capita income for the county was $14,134. About 14.10% of families and 18.90% of the population were below the poverty line, including 26.20% of those under age 18 and 12.10% of those age 65 or over.

== Culture and contemporary life ==
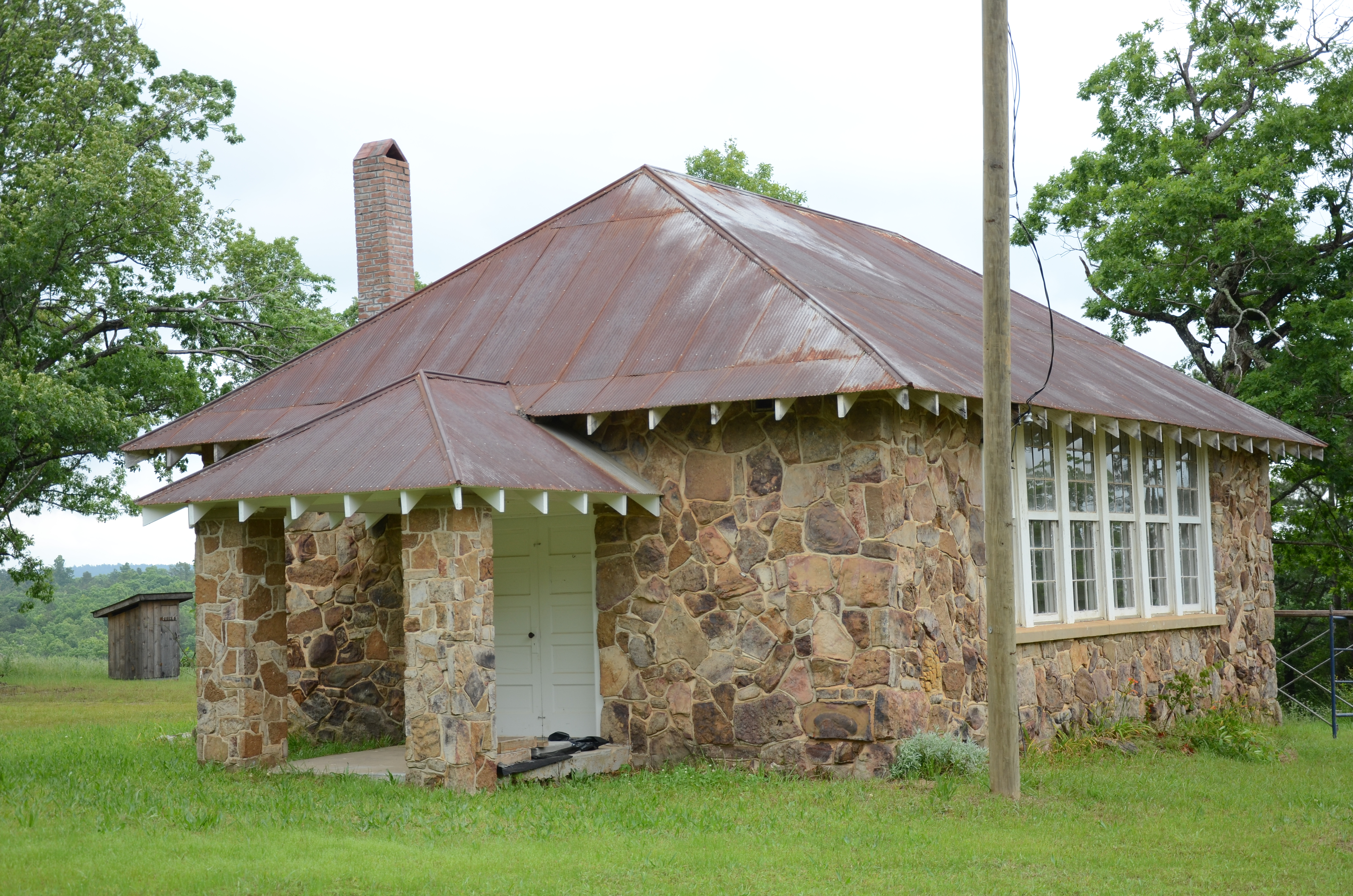
Built c. 1930, the Luber School is one of many period structures built using the stone for which the county is named

=== Media ===
The county newspaper is the Stone County Leader, a weekly published in Mountain View since 1952. Former newspapers include the Stone County Democrat and Mountain View Herald (1932–1953). Mountain View has also produced several short-lived publications, including the Mountain View News (1905–1906), The Mountain View (1973–1974), and The Ozark Times (1906–1913).

The Stone County Historical Society has published the Heritage of Stone since 1972. Issued twice annually to members and available to the public for individual purchase, the publication covers topics relating to the history and culture of Stone County.

== Government ==
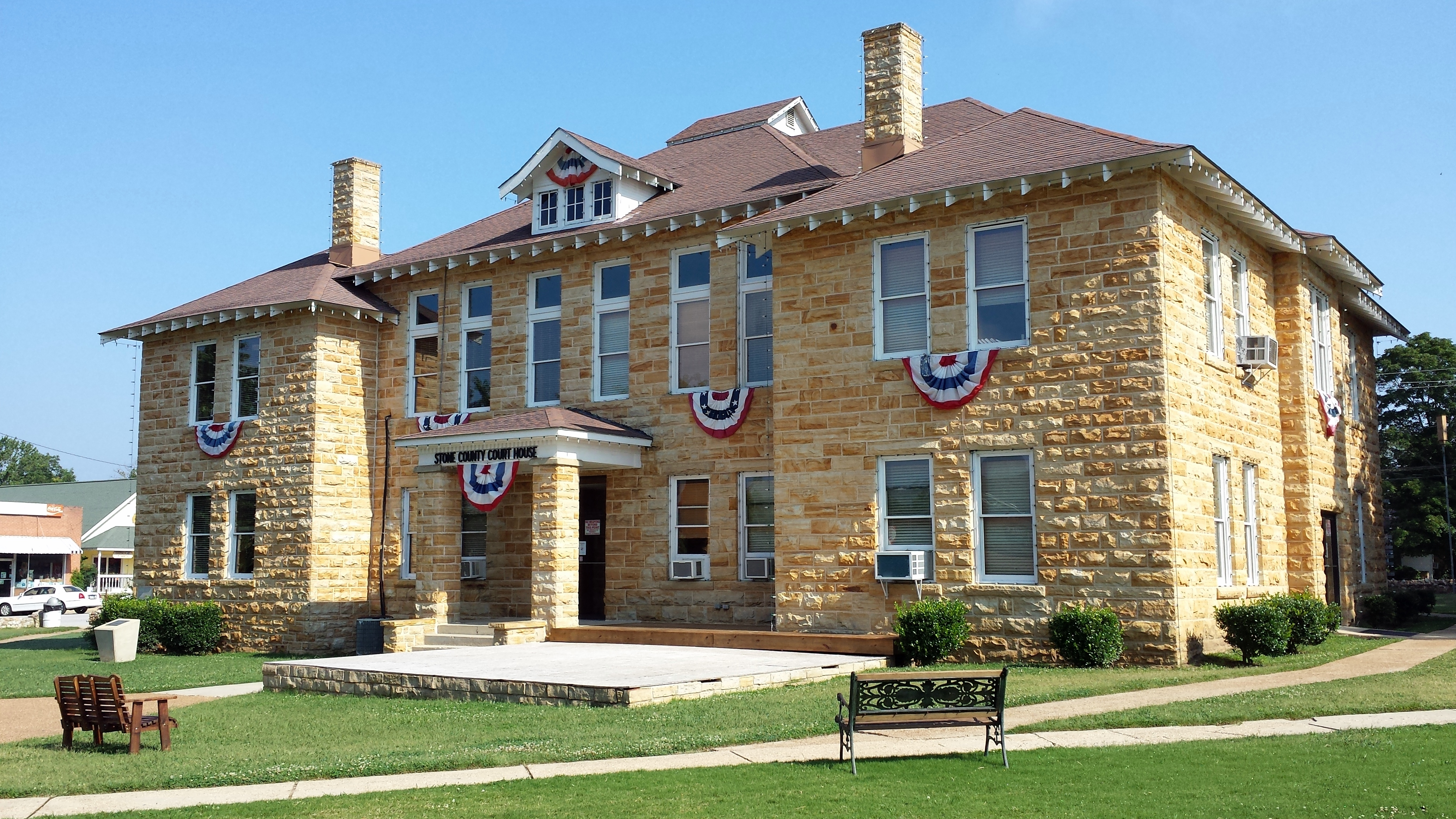
The Stone County Courthouse has been the seat of county government since 1922.

The county government is a constitutional body granted specific powers by the Constitution of Arkansas and the Arkansas Code. The quorum court is the legislative branch of the county government and controls all spending and revenue collection. Representatives are called justices of the peace and are elected from county districts every even-numbered year. The number of districts in a county vary from nine to fifteen, and district boundaries are drawn by the county election commission. The Stone County Quorum Court has nine members. Presiding over quorum court meetings is the county judge, who serves as the chief operating officer of the county. The county judge is elected at-large and does not vote in quorum court business, although capable of vetoing quorum court decisions.

Stone County, Arkansas Elected countywide officials
Position	Officeholder	Party
County Judge	Stacey Avey	Independent
County/Circuit Clerk	Angie Hudspeth-Wade	Independent
Sheriff	Brandon Long	Republican
Treasurer	Kayla Meeker	Republican
Collector	Karen Hodges	Republican
Assessor	Heather Stevens	Independent
Coroner	Joseph A. Blake	Republican
Surveyor	William "Randy" Berry	(Unknown)

The composition of the Quorum Court following the 2024 elections is 9 Republicans. Justices of the Peace (members) of the Quorum Court following the elections are:

- District 1: Jim Bullard (R)
- District 2: Travis Trammell (R)
- District 3: Billy Wayne Mitchell (R)
- District 4: Jason Kocher (R)
- District 5: Ronald Clark (R)
- District 6: Mark Davis (R)
- District 7: Michael W. Vickers (R)
- District 8: Neal Harness (R)
- District 9: Eddie Cowell (R)

Additionally, the townships of Stone County are entitled to elect their own respective constables, as set forth by the Constitution of Arkansas. Constables are largely of historical significance as they were used to keep the peace in rural areas when travel was more difficult. The township constables as of the 2024 elections are:

- District 1: Travis Shepherd (R)
- District 2: Chip Doss (R)
- District 3: Tom Falci (R)
- District 4: John P. Walsh (R)
- District 5: Michael Tharp (R)
- District 6: Justin Meeks (R)
- District 7: Bob Cook (R)
- District 8: Lisa Freshler Murphy (R)
- District 9: Keenan Glenn (R)

=== Taxation ===
Property tax is assessed by the Stone County Assessor annually based upon the fair market value of the property and determining which tax rate, commonly called a millage in Arkansas, will apply. The rate depends upon the property's location with respect to city limits, school district, and special tax increment financing (TIF) districts. This tax is collected by the Stone County Collector between the first business day of March of each year through October 15 without penalty. The Stone County Treasurer disburses tax revenues to various government agencies, such as cities, county road departments, fire departments, libraries, and police departments in accordance with the budget set by the quorum court.

Sales and use taxes in Arkansas are voter approved and collected by the Arkansas Department of Finance and Administration. Arkansas's statewide sales and use tax has been 6.5% since July 1, 2013. Stone County has an additional sales and use tax of 1%, which has been in effect since May 1, 1987. Within Stone County, the City of Mountain View has had an additional 2% sales and use tax since September 1, 2005. The Arkansas State Treasurer disburses state tax revenue to counties/cities in accordance with tax rules.

== Politics ==
In Congress, Arkansas has been represented by two Republican senators (John Boozman and Tom Cotton) since January 3, 2015, ending a long history of Democratic hegemony. In the House of Representatives, Stone County is within the Arkansas 1st district, which contains the Arkansas Delta. The Arkansas 1st has been represented by Rick Crawford since 2010.

In the Arkansas Senate, Stone County is within the 18th District, which also contains all of Cleburne and Searcy counties and parts of Faulkner, Fulton, Baxter, Marion, Van Buren, and White counties. The 18th District has been represented by Missy Irvin (R) of Mountain View since 2011.

At the presidential level, Stone County was reliably Democratic, voting for the Democratic nominee in every election through 1948. In 1952, the county backed Republican Dwight D. Eisenhower but then swung back to Democrat Adlai Stevenson II in 1956, opposite of national trends. The county continued to swing between parties through the rest of the 19th Century until the 2000 election. Over the past several election cycles, Stone county has trended heavily towards the GOP. The last Democrat (as of 2024) to carry this county was Arkansas native Bill Clinton in 1996.

United States presidential election results for Stone County, Arkansas
Year	Republican		Democratic		Third party(ies)	
Year	No.	%	No.	%	No.	%
1896	172	18.96%	728	80.26%	7	0.77%
1900	231	30.28%	520	68.15%	12	1.57%
1904	233	43.15%	277	51.30%	30	5.56%
1908	267	33.33%	496	61.92%	38	4.74%
1912	113	18.46%	337	55.07%	162	26.47%
1916	298	30.41%	682	69.59%	0	0.00%
1920	367	39.25%	516	55.19%	52	5.56%
1924	210	32.31%	386	59.38%	54	8.31%
1928	499	43.62%	628	54.90%	17	1.49%
1932	261	18.78%	1,100	79.14%	29	2.09%
1936	248	32.12%	521	67.49%	3	0.39%
1940	406	38.41%	644	60.93%	7	0.66%
1944	549	47.57%	592	51.30%	13	1.13%
1948	644	33.56%	1,186	61.80%	89	4.64%
1952	700	54.95%	573	44.98%	1	0.08%
1956	651	46.14%	756	53.58%	4	0.28%
1960	959	49.36%	897	46.17%	87	4.48%
1964	942	40.26%	1,374	58.72%	24	1.03%
1968	987	37.05%	698	26.20%	979	36.75%
1972	1,989	67.38%	958	32.45%	5	0.17%
1976	1,014	27.06%	2,718	72.54%	15	0.40%
1980	1,793	45.11%	1,968	49.51%	214	5.38%
1984	2,325	57.48%	1,654	40.89%	66	1.63%
1988	2,186	55.17%	1,728	43.61%	48	1.21%
1992	1,672	33.18%	2,622	52.03%	745	14.78%
1996	1,526	34.36%	2,227	50.15%	688	15.49%
2000	2,623	53.97%	2,043	42.04%	194	3.99%
2004	3,188	57.45%	2,255	40.64%	106	1.91%
2008	3,534	66.38%	1,598	30.02%	192	3.61%
2012	3,776	70.53%	1,356	25.33%	222	4.15%
2016	4,113	73.21%	1,203	21.41%	302	5.38%
2020	4,616	77.74%	1,180	19.87%	142	2.39%
2024	4,808	79.73%	1,089	18.06%	133	2.21%

== Communities ==
Two incorporated cities are located within the county. The largest city and county seat, Mountain View, is relatively centrally located in the oddly-shaped county. Mountain View's population in 2010 was 2,748, marking the first decennial decline since the 1960 Census. Fifty-Six has maintained a stable population under 200 since incorporation.

Stone County has dozens of unincorporated communities and ghost towns within its borders. This is due to early settlers in Arkansas tending to settle in small clusters rather than incorporated towns. For example, communities like Newnata had a post office and dozens of buildings at some point in their history. Other communities are simply a few dwellings at a crossroads that have adopted a common place name over time. Some are officially listed as populated places by the United States Geological Survey, and others are listed as historic settlements.

=== Cities ===
- Fifty-Six
- Mountain View (county seat)

=== Census-designated place ===
- Fox
- Pleasant Grove

=== Unincorporated communities ===
- Alco
- Allison
- Arlberg
- Ben
- Big Springs
- Chalybeate Springs
- East Richwoods
- Flag
- Fox
- Gayler
- Hanover
- Harness
- Herpel
- Luber
- Lydalisk
- Marcella
- Meadow Creek
- Melrose
- Mozart
- Newnata
- Old Lexington
- Onia
- Optimus
- Parma
- Pleasant Grove
- Pleasant Hill
- Rushing
- St. James
- Timbo
- Turkey Creek
- West Richwoods

=== Historical communities ===
- Bluetip
- Bothersome
- Boyle
- Buckhorn
- Hedges
- Kahoka
- May
- Oga
- Pekin
- Red Stripe

=== Townships ===
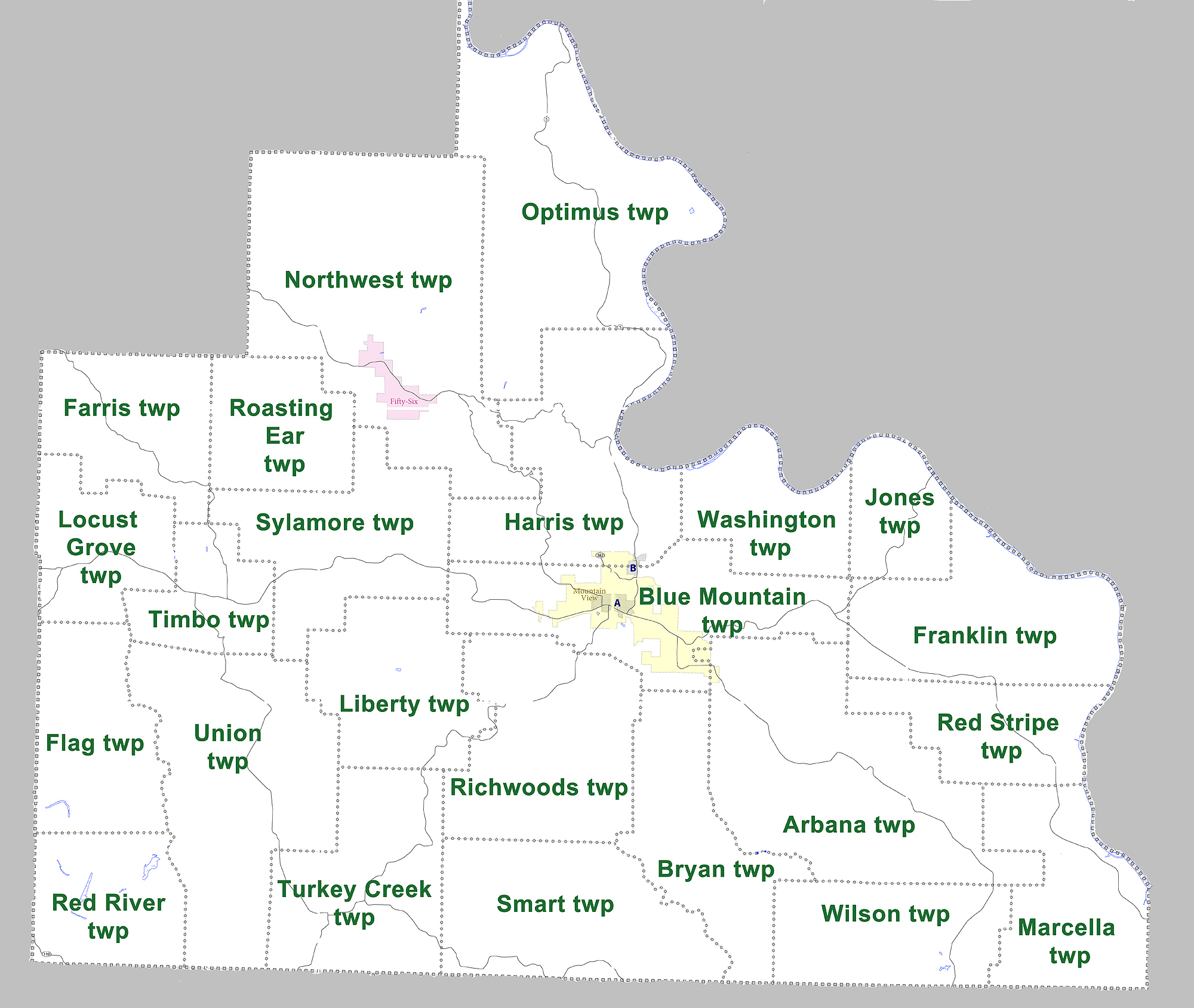
Townships in Stone County, Arkansas as of 2010

Townships in Arkansas are the divisions of a county. Each township includes unincorporated areas; some may have incorporated cities or towns within part of their boundaries. Arkansas townships have limited purposes in modern times. However, the United States census does list Arkansas population based on townships (sometimes referred to as "county subdivisions" or "minor civil divisions"). Townships are also of value for historical purposes in terms of genealogical research. Each town or city is within one or more townships in an Arkansas county based on census maps and publications. The townships of Stone County are listed below; listed in parentheses are the cities, towns, and/or census-designated places that are fully or partially inside the township.

- Arbana (small part of Mountain View)
- Blue Mountain (most of Mountain View)
- Bryan
- Farris
- Flag
- Franklin
- Harris (small part of Mountain View)
- Jones
- Liberty
- Locust Grove
- Marcella
- Northwest (Fifty-Six)
- Optimus
- Red River
- Red Stripe
- Richwoods
- Roasting Ear
- Smart
- Sylamore
- Timbo
- Turkey Creek
- Union
- Washington
- Wilson

== Infrastructure ==
=== Aviation ===
Mountain View Airport is the only public owned/public use airport in Stone County. Also known as Harry E. Wilcox Memorial Field, the facility is a small, rural general aviation airport with 5,650 annual operations. Stone County also contains one private airfield. The nearest commercial service airport is Clinton National Airport in Little Rock.

=== Major highways ===
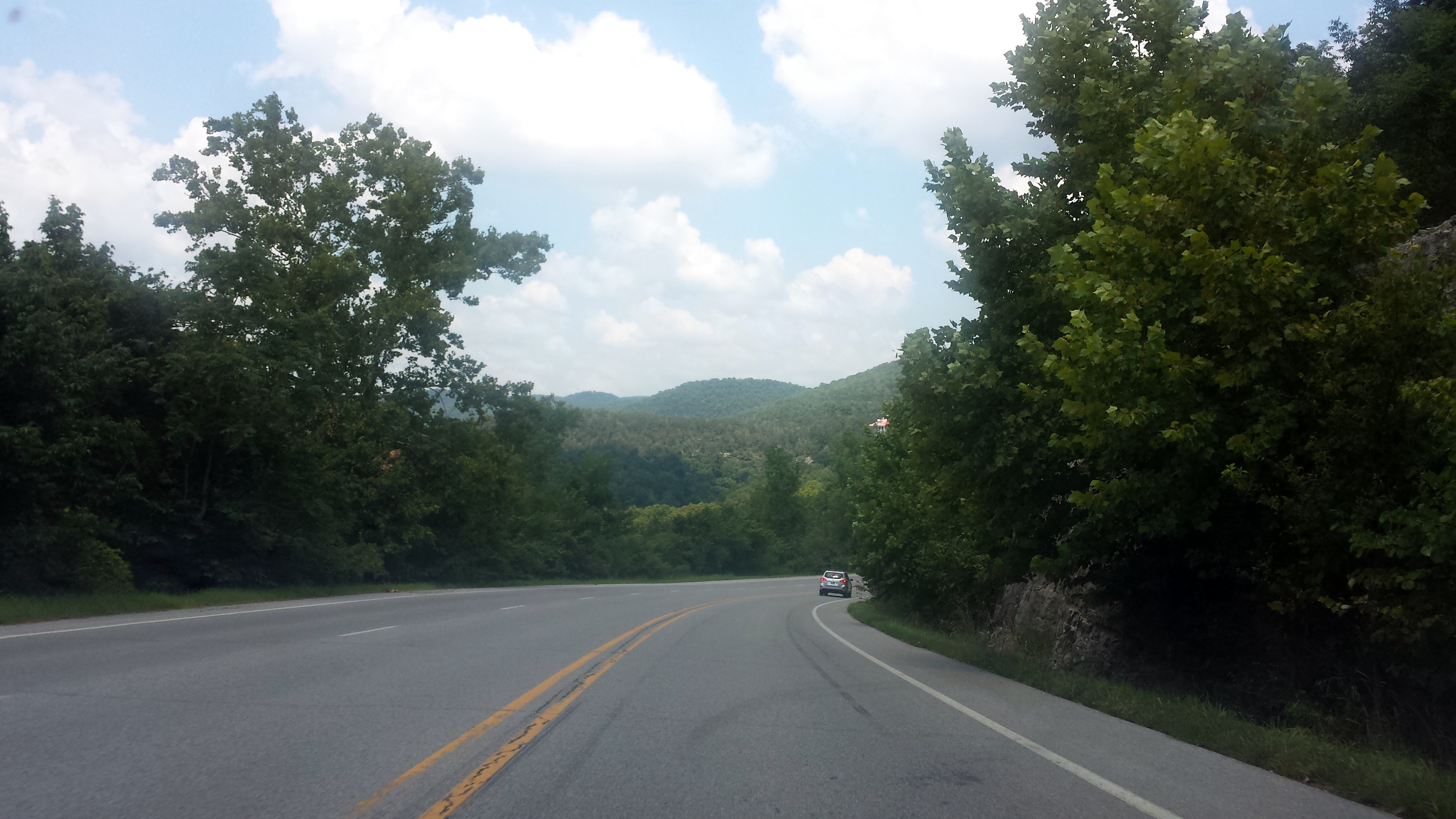
Highway 5/9/14 pass through the Ozarks north of Mountain View

- AR 5
- AR 9
- AR 14
- AR 58
- AR 66
- AR 74
- AR 86
- AR 87
- AR 110
- AR 263
- AR 382

The county also contains the Sylamore Scenic Byway, an Arkansas Scenic Byway and National Forest Scenic Byway.

=== Utilities ===
Entergy Arkansas is the sole provider of electricity in almost all of Stone County, with exceptions in the northern tip (served by North Arkansas Electric Cooperative), south of Mountain View (First Electric Cooperative) and the southwest corner (Petit Jean Electric Cooperative).

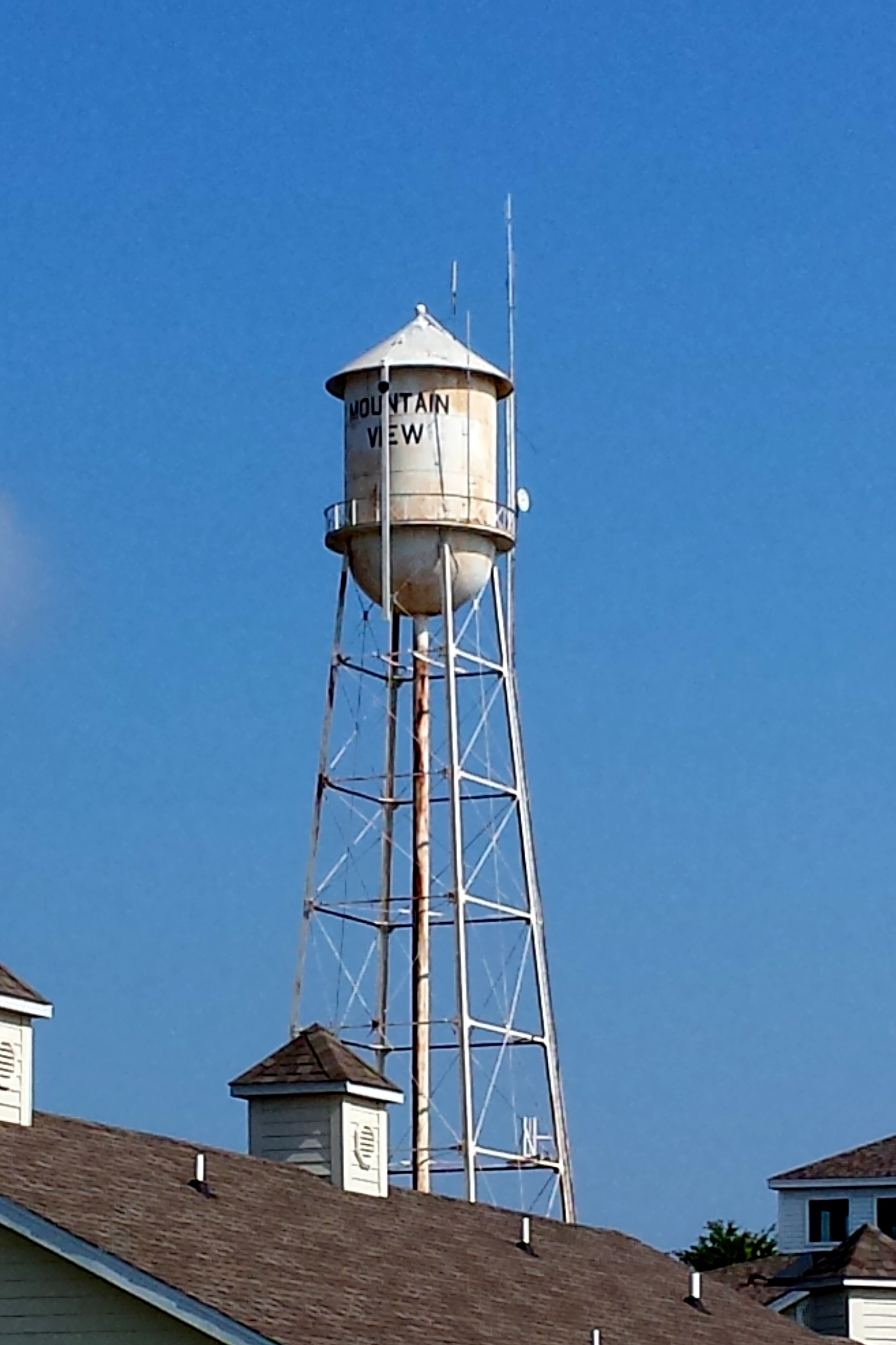
Mountain View's downtown water tower is listed on the NRHP

The Arkansas Department of Health (ADH) is responsible for the regulation and oversight of public water systems throughout the state. Stone County contains six community water systems: the City of Fifty-Six Water Department, the City of Mountain View Water Department, Pleasant Grove Water Association, Richwoods Water Association, Sylamore Valley Water Association, and the West Stone County Water Association. Mountain View has the largest direct retail population served (7,295, all in Stone County), followed by West Stone County (4,634, including customers served in adjacent counties), Pleasant Grove Water Association (2,315), and Richwoods Water Association (1,436), with the remaining systems under 600 retail population served. Of the water systems serving Stone County, only Fifty-Six uses groundwater, the Gunter Sandstone Aquifer, though also purchasing water from Big Flat, which pumps from the same aquifer. The City of Mountain View uses the White River, and the remaining systems purchasing treated water from Mountain View. (Note: West Stone County Water Association also purchases water from Community Water Systems, whose source is Greers Ferry Lake.)

== See also ==
- List of lakes in Stone County, Arkansas
- National Register of Historic Places listings in Stone County, Arkansas
