= Arkansas Highway 110 =

State highway in Arkansas, United States

Highway 110

Route information
- Maintained by ArDOT
- Existed: c. 1936–present

Section 1
- Length: 16.71 mi (26.89 km)
- West end: US 65 at Botkinburg
- East end: AR 9 / AR 16 near Shirley

Section 2
- Length: 3.15 mi (5.07 km)
- West end: AR 16 / AR 92 in Greers Ferry
- East end: Shiloh Park, Greers Ferry Lake

Section 3
- Length: 20.43 mi (32.88 km)
- West end: Sugar Maple Dr/Old Tr
- East end: AR 124 in Pangburn

Location
- Country: United States
- State: Arkansas

Highway system
- Arkansas Highway System; Interstate; US; State; Business; Spurs; Suffixed; Scenic; Heritage
| ← AR 109 | → AR 111 |

Arkansas Highway 110 (AR 110) is a designation for three state highways in north central Arkansas. One segment of 16.71 miles (26.89 km) runs east from U.S. Route 65 (US 65) at Botkinburg to Highway 9/Highway 16 near Shirley. A second route of 3.15 miles (5.07 km) begins at Highway 16/Highway 92 in Greers Ferry and runs east to the lake shore of Greers Ferry Lake. A third segment of 20.43 miles (32.88 km) begins at the Sugar Maple Dr/Old Tr intersection outside Heber Springs and runs east to Highway 16 in Pangburn.

== Route description ==
=== Botkinburg to Shirley ===
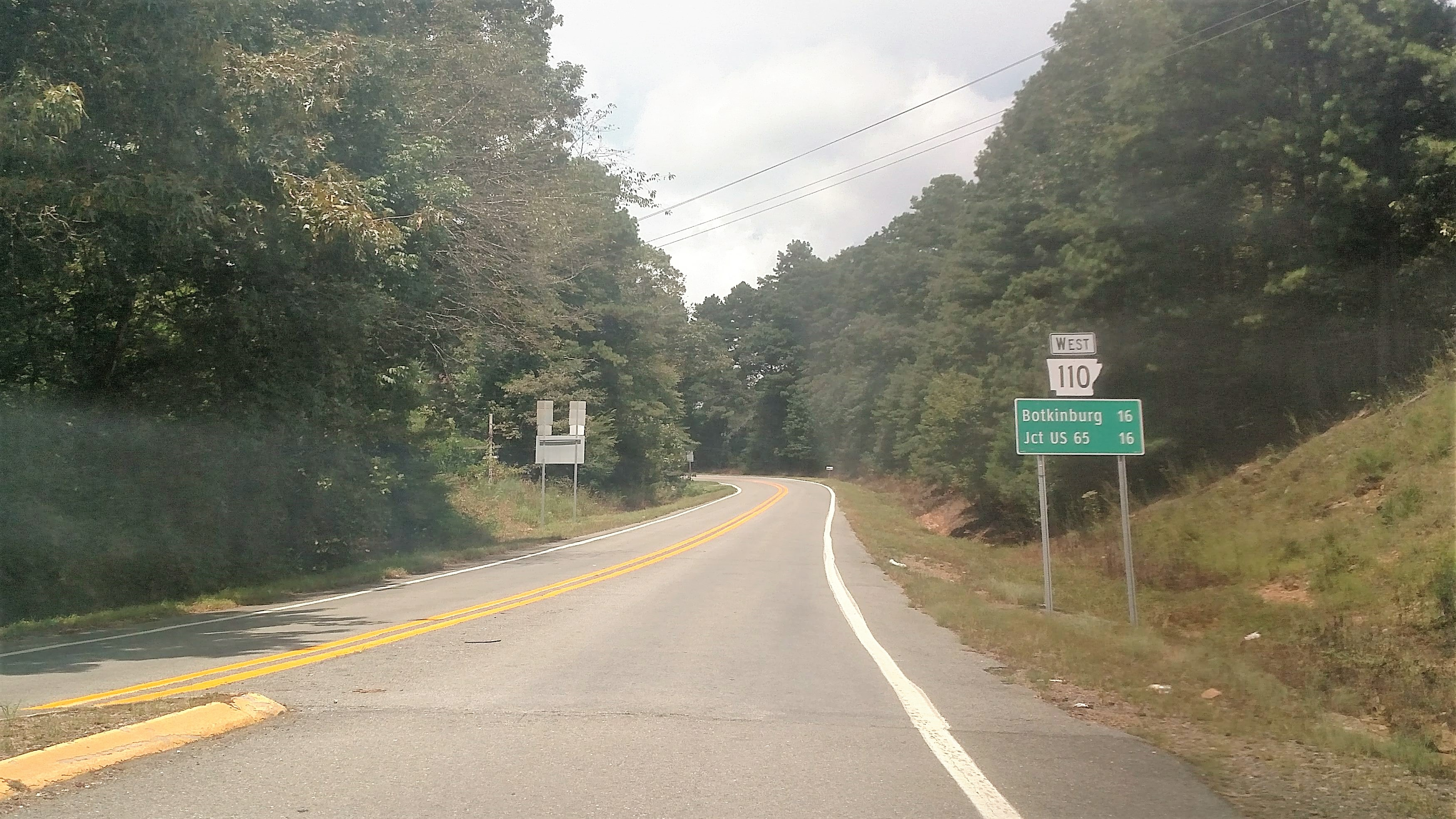
First reassurance marker heading west

Highway 110 begins at US 65 in Botkinburg in northern Van Buren County. The highway winds east through Plant into Stone County. Although only running in the county for 1.45 miles (2.33 km), the highway passes the historic Joe Guffey House in Old Lexington, a property listed on the National Register of Historic Places (NRHP). Upon returning to Van Buren County the highway continues southeast to terminate at Highway 9/Highway 16 near Shirley. The route does not intersect any other state highways along its routing.

=== Greers Ferry to Greers Ferry Lake ===
Highway 110 begins at Highway 16/Highway 92 in Greers Ferry in western Cleburne County. The highway runs southeast through an undeveloped part of the small town to Shiloh Park on Greers Ferry Lake. State maintenance ends at the shore of the lake, where the highway formerly continued south to Heber Springs prior to the damming of the Little Red River in 1962.

=== Greers Ferry Lake to Pangburn ===
Highway 110 begins on the east side of Greers Ferry Lake on Eden Isle. The highway crosses an isthmus to enter Heber Springs. The highway has a junction with Highway 107 before entering downtown Heber Springs and beginning a concurrency with Highway 25B (AR 25B) for several blocks. While downtown, the highways enter the Heber Springs Commercial Historic District, including the T.E. Olmstead & Son Funeral Home, Cleburne County Courthouse, all listed on the NRHP. Highway 25B turns north to end the concurrency at 2nd St as Highway 110 runs east past the Woman's Community Club Band Shell in Spring Park before a junction with Highway 5/Highway 25. Following this junction the highway passes Sugarloaf Mountain and crosses the Little Red River on its way to Wilburn. After Wilburn the highway turns south and runs through Hiram before entering White County and terminating at Highway 124 in Pangburn very near Highway 16.

== History ==
Highway 110 first appears on the 1936 state highway map between Shirley and US 65 south of Leslie as an unimproved earth trunk line route. By 1945, the western terminus was moved south to Botkinburg, resulting in today's current alignment. During the same time, a highway running east from Heber Springs to the Little Red River was designated Highway 110, marked as a gravel road. Highway 110 was rerouted onto a new alignment in July 1958, crossing the river at a new location and continuing east to Wilburn. Following this realignment, the portion that was formerly signed Highway 110 was renumbered Highway 210, a routing that remains today. Following the completion of the Greers Ferry Dam by the United States Army Corps of Engineers (USACE) in 1962, Greers Ferry Lake flooded the original alignment of Highway 16 between Greers Ferry and Heber Springs, separating the alignments. Highway 16 was rerouted to the southwest, and the former segments (Greers Ferry to Shiloh Park and Eden Isle to Heber Springs) were added to the state highway system in June 1965. In May 1973 the highway was extended from Wilburn to Hiram. A county highway from Pangburn to the Cleburne County line was also added to the state highway system in May 1973 as Highway 110. The route's discontinuity between the White/Cleburne County line and Hiram of 3.64 miles (5.86 km) was removed when the intermediate highway became Highway 110 in February 1974.

== Major intersections ==
| County | Location | mi | km | Destinations | Notes |
|---|---|---|---|---|---|
| Van Buren | Botkinburg | 0.00 | 0.00 | US 65 – Clinton, Marshall | Western terminus |
| Stone | No major junctions | | | | |
| Van Buren | Shirley | 16.71 | 26.89 | AR 9 / AR 16 – Shirley, Mountain View, Clinton | Eastern terminus |
Gap in route
| Cleburne | Greers Ferry | 0.00 | 0.00 | AR 16 / AR 92 (Edgemont Road) – Higden, Narrows Park | Western terminus |
| Cleburne | Greers Ferry | 3.15 | 5.07 | Greers Ferry Lake | Eastern terminus |
| Cleburne | Gap in route | | | | |
| Cleburne | | 0.00 | 0.00 | Sugar Maple Dr/Old Tr | Western terminus |
| Cleburne | Heber Springs | 0.93 | 1.50 | AR 107 south to AR 25 | AR 107 northern terminus |
| Cleburne | Heber Springs | 4.23 | 6.81 | AR 25B south (South 7th Street) | Southern end of AR 25B concurrency |
| Cleburne | Heber Springs | 4.57 | 7.35 | AR 25B north (North 2nd Street) | Northern end of AR 25B concurrency |
| Cleburne | Heber Springs | 6.42 | 10.33 | AR 5 / AR 25 – Ida, Batesville | |
| Cleburne | Heber Springs | 7.33 | 11.80 | AR 210 (Industrial Park Road) | |
| White | Pangburn | 20.43 | 32.88 | AR 124 (Monroe St) to AR 16 | Eastern terminus |
1.000 mi = 1.609 km; 1.000 km = 0.621 mi: Concurrency terminus

== See also ==
- List of state highways in Arkansas
