= Auxiliary routes of Arkansas Highway 25 =

State highway in Arkansas, United States

The creation of Greers Ferry Lake caused the rerouting of Highway 25, with the remaining roadway redesignated as special routes.

Three auxiliary routes of Arkansas Highway 25 currently exist. Two are spur routes, with one serving as a business route.

== Heber Springs business route ==
Highway 25B
- Location: Heber Springs
- Length: 5.53 mi (8.90 km)

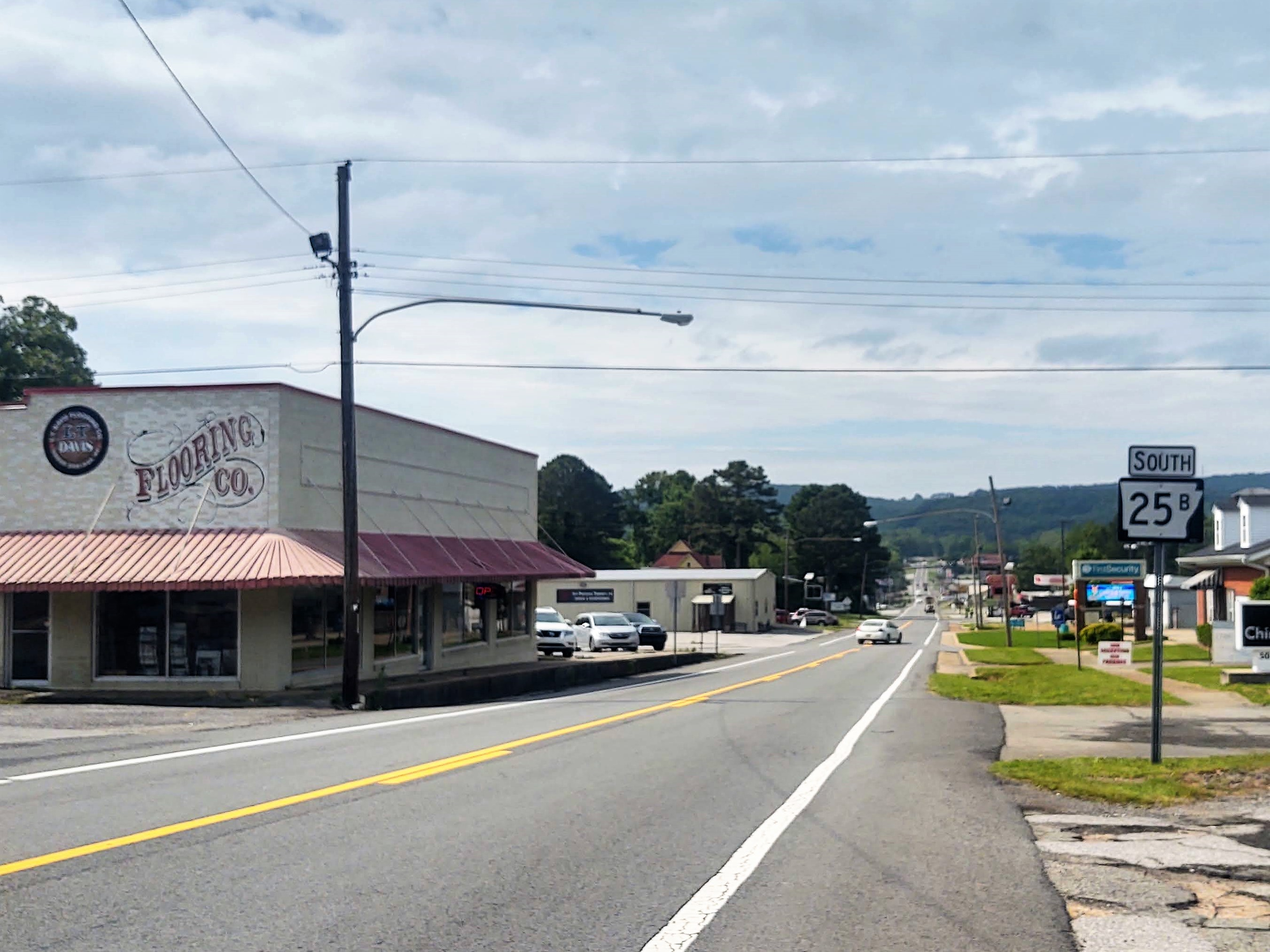
Highway 25B in Heber Springs

Arkansas Highway 25 Business is a business route in Heber Springs. The route is 5.53-mile (8.90 km) in length.

The route passes through downtown Heber Springs, specifically passing the T.E. Olmstead & Son Funeral Home, Hugh L. King House, the Cleburne County Courthouse, and properties within the Heber Springs Commercial Historic District, each listed on the National Register of Historic Places.

Major intersections

The entire route is in Heber Springs, Cleburne County.

mi	km	Destinations	Notes
0.0	0.0	AR 5 / AR 25	Southern terminus
1.6	2.6	AR 110 west (West Main Street)	Southern end of AR 110 concurrency
1.9	3.1	AR 110 east (East Main Street)	Northern end of AR 110 concurrency
3.7	6.0	AR 210 north (Case Ford Road)	Southern terminus of AR 201
4.6	7.4	AR 980 (Airport Road) – Airport	
5.6	9.0	AR 5 / AR 25	Northern terminus
1.000 mi = 1.609 km; 1.000 km = 0.621 mi: Concurrency terminus

== Tumbling Shoals spur ==
Highway 25S
- Location: Tumbling Shoals
- Length: 3.01 mi (4.84 km)
- Existed: 1974–present

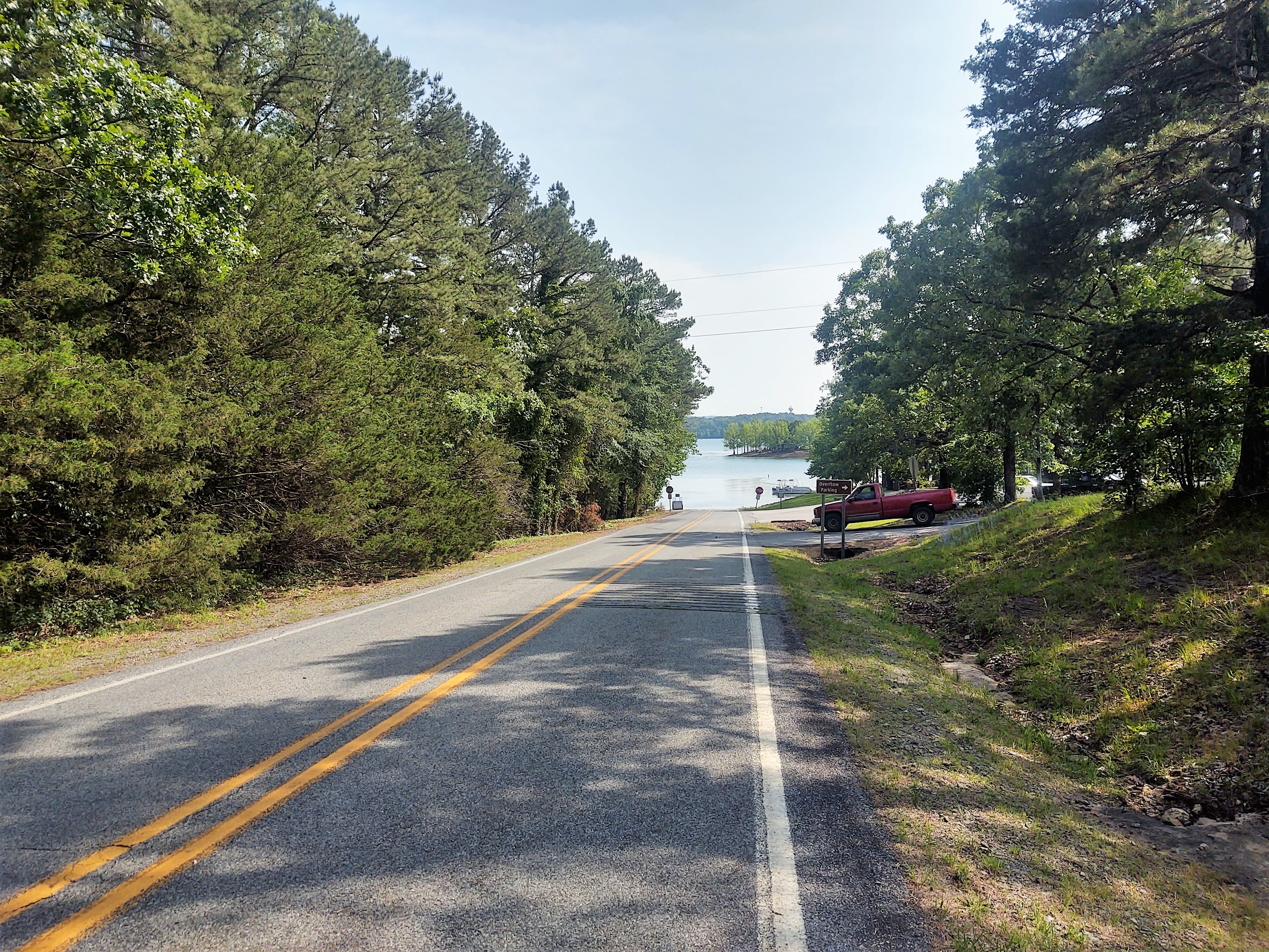
Highway 25S ends before the roadway enters Greers Ferry Lake

Arkansas Highway 25 Spur is a spur route in Tumbling Shoals. It is a former alignment of Highway 25 that leads to Greers Ferry Lake and Old Highway 25 Park.

Major intersections

The entire route is in Tumbling Shoals, Cleburne County.

mi	km	Destinations	Notes
3.01	4.84	Old Highway 25 Park, Greers Ferry Lake	Western terminus
0.00	0.00	AR 5 / AR 25	Eastern terminus
1.000 mi = 1.609 km; 1.000 km = 0.621 mi

== Charlotte spur ==
Highway 25S
- Location: Charlotte
- Length: 0.74 mi (1,190 m)
- Existed: 1974–present

Arkansas Highway 25 Spur is a spur route in Charlotte. The route is 0.74-mile (1.19 km) in length and runs south, where it continues as Weaver Lane.

Major intersections

The entire route is in Charlotte, Independence County.

mi	km	Destinations	Notes
0.74	1.19	Weaver Lane	Continuation west
0.00	0.00	AR 25	Northern terminus
1.000 mi = 1.609 km; 1.000 km = 0.621 mi

== Former route ==
Highway 25S
- Location: Heber Springs
- Length: 0.6 mi (970 m)
- Existed: 2007

Arkansas Highway 25 Spur was a 0.6-mile (0.97 km) spur route in Heber Springs.
