= Arkansas Highway 210 =

State highway in Arkansas, United States

Highway 210

Route information
- Maintained by ArDOT
- Existed: 1958–present

Section 1
- Length: 0.82 mi (1,320 m)
- West end: Greers Ferry Lake
- East end: AR 25B in Heber Springs

Section 2
- Length: 2.25 mi (3.62 km)
- West end: AR 110
- East end: Cow Shoals Lane

Location
- Country: United States
- State: Arkansas
- Counties: Cleburne

Highway system
- Arkansas Highway System; Interstate; US; State; Business; Spurs; Suffixed; Scenic; Heritage
← AR 209	→ AR 211

Arkansas Highway 210 (AR 210 and Hwy. 210) is a designation for two east–west state highways in Cleburne County, Arkansas. One segment of 0.82 miles (1.32 km) runs in Heber Springs from Greers Ferry Lake east to Heber Springs Road (Highway 25B) as Case Ford Road. A second segment begins at Highway 110 and runs northeast as Industrial Park Rd.

== Route description ==
=== Case Ford Road segment ===
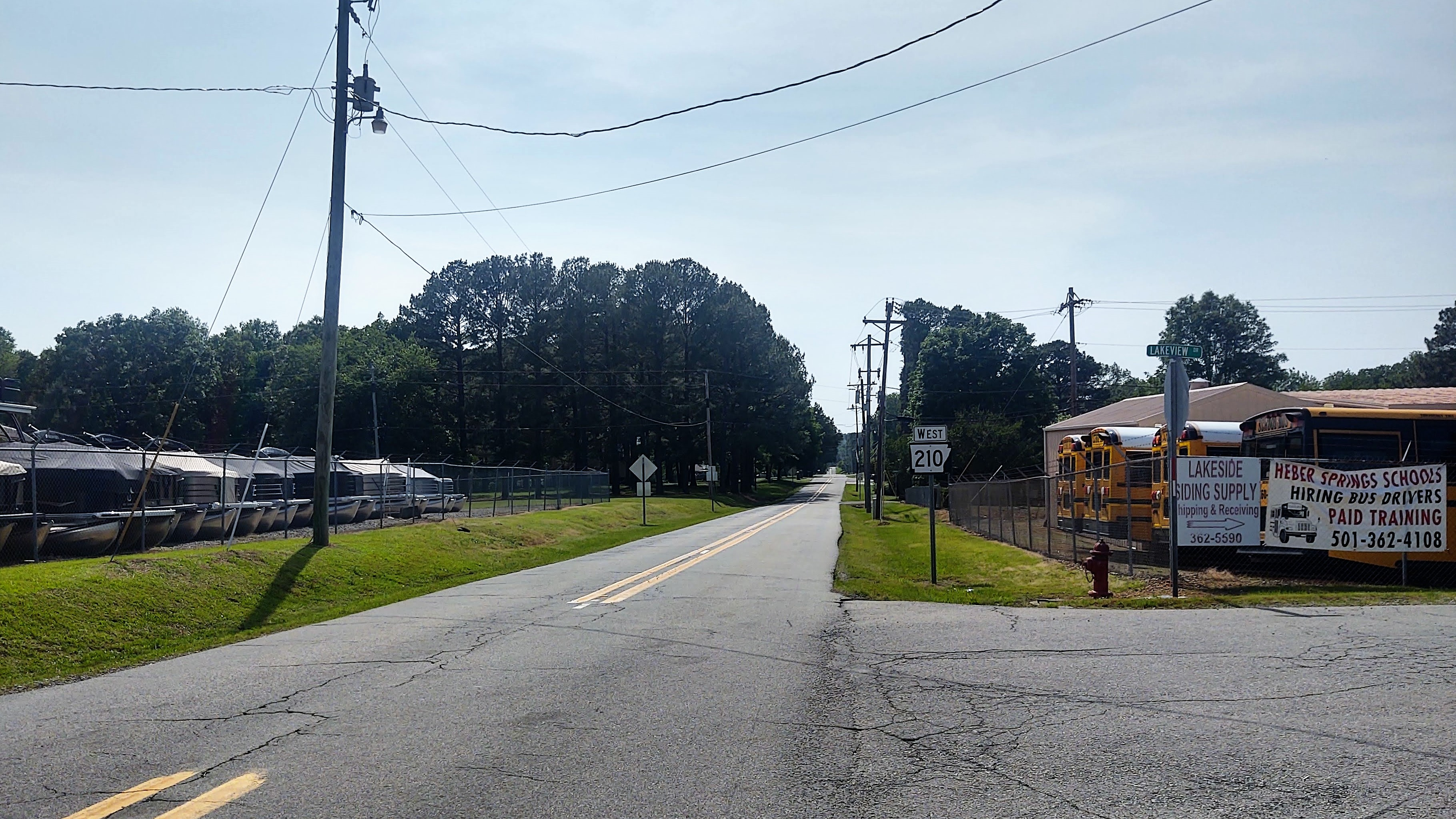
Highway 210 in Heber Springs

The route begins at the shores of Greers Ferry Lake and runs south to terminate at Heber Springs Road (Highway 25B). The route is two-lane, undivided for its entire length.

=== Industrial Park Road segment ===
Highway 210 begins at Highway 110 near Sugarloaf Mountain and the Arkansas State University-Beebe Heber Springs campus. It runs northeast through an industrial area to terminate at Cow Shoals Lane.

== History ==
Highway 210 first appeared in the 1959 Arkansas state highway map. The route ran from Highway 110 west of Heber Springs to the northeast. The Arkansas State Highway Commission later extended Highway 210 "to provide public access to Greers Ferry Lake". The segment from Heber Springs to Greers Ferry Lake was added prior to 1970.

== Major intersections ==
The entire route is in Cleburne County.

Location	mi	km	Destinations	Notes
Heber Springs	0.0	0.0	Greers Ferry Lake	western terminus
Heber Springs	0.82	1.32	AR 25B (Heber Springs Road)	eastern terminus
Gap in route
	0.0	0.0	AR 110 (Wilburn Road)	western terminus
	2.25	3.62	End state maintenance at Cow Shoals Lane	eastern terminus
1.000 mi = 1.609 km; 1.000 km = 0.621 mi
