= Cleburne County Courthouse =

Cleburne County Courthouse may refer to:

- Cleburne County Courthouse (Alabama), Heflin, Alabama
- Cleburne County Courthouse (Arkansas), Heber Springs, Arkansas
