= Concord High School (Arkansas) =

Location
- 10920 North Heber Springs Road; Concord, Arkansas 72523; United States; 35°39′50″N 91°50′45″W

Information
- School type: Public comprehensive
- Established: 1949 (77 years ago)
- Status: Open
- School district: Concord School District
- CEEB code: 040485
- NCES School ID: 050456000181
- Teaching staff: 16.71 (on FTE basis)
- Grades: 7–12
- Enrollment: 185 (2010–11)
  - Grade 7: 25
  - Grade 8: 39
  - Grade 9: 36
  - Grade 10: 34
  - Grade 11: 28
  - Grade 12: 23
- Student to teacher ratio: 11.07
- Education system: ADE Smart Core
- Classes offered: Regular, Advanced Placement (AP)
- Colors: Purple and gold
- Athletics: Basketball, Golf, Cross Country, Baseball, Softball, Tennis
- Athletics conference: 1A 2 South (2012–14)
- Mascot: Pirate
- Team name: Concord Pirates
- Accreditation: ADE
- Communities served: Drasco, Mountain View, Locust Grove, Wilburn, Heber Springs, Tumbling Shoals, Pangburn, Concord, Floral, Ida
- Federal Funding: Title I
- Website: www.concordschools.org

Concord High School is a comprehensive public high school located in the rural, distant community of Concord, Arkansas, United States. The high school provides secondary education for students in grades 7 through 12 and serves as one of five public high schools in Cleburne County, Arkansas.

The school's district includes Concord, Drasco, Wilburn, and a very small portion of Tumbling Shoals.

== Academics ==
Concord High School is accredited by the Arkansas Department of Education (ADE) and the assumed course of study follows the Smart Core curriculum developed by the ADE, which requires students complete at least 22 units prior to graduation. Students complete regular (core and elective) and career focus courses and examinations and may take Advanced Placement (AP) courses and test with the opportunity to receive college credit. Concord receives Title I federal funding.

== Athletics ==
The Concord High School mascot and athletic emblem is the Pirate, with purple and gold serving as the school colors. The Concord Pirates participate in interscholastic activities within the 1A Classification—the state's smallest—from the 1A 2 South Conference, as administered by the Arkansas Activities Association. The Pirates compete in golf (boys/girls), cross-country running (boys/girls), basketball (boys/girls), baseball, fastpitch softball, tennis (boys/girls), and cheer.
