= Tannenbaum, Arkansas =

Unincorporated community in Arkansas, US

Coordinates: 35°33′32″N 92°03′26″W

Tannenbaum is an unincorporated community in Cleburne County, Arkansas, United States. It shares a ZIP code 72530 with Drasco. Tannenbaum features chalet-like homes built on the northeast side of Greers Ferry Lake near Heber Springs. The community also has a boat dock and ramp, as well as recreational areas and an airfield.
