= Wilburn, Arkansas =

- Census-designated place
- Location within Arkansas Location within the United States
- Coordinates: 35°30′32″N 91°53′18″W
- Country: United States
- State: Arkansas
- County: Cleburne
- Elevation: 423 ft (129 m)

Population (2020)
  - Total: 132
- Time zone: UTC-6 (Central (CST))
  - Summer (DST): UTC-5 (CDT)
- ZIP code: 72179
- Area code: 501
- GNIS feature ID: 2805698

Wilburn is an unincorporated community and census-designated place (CDP) in Cleburne County, Arkansas, United States. Wilburn is located on Arkansas Highway 110, 8 miles (13 km) east of Heber Springs. Wilburn has a post office with ZIP code 72179.

It was first listed as a CDP in the 2020 census with a population of 132.

The Concord School District operates area schools, including Concord High School. On July 1, 2004, the Wilburn School District consolidated into the Concord School District.

== Demographics ==
Historical population
Census	Pop.	Note	%±
2020	132		—
U.S. Decennial Census; 2020

=== 2020 census ===
Wilburn CDP, Arkansas – Demographic Profile (NH = Non-Hispanic) Note: the US Census treats Hispanic/Latino as an ethnic category. This table excludes Latinos from the racial categories and assigns them to a separate category. Hispanics/Latinos may be of any race.
Race / Ethnicity	Pop 2020	% 2020
White alone (NH)	116	87.88%
Black or African American alone (NH)	1	0.76%
Native American or Alaska Native alone (NH)	3	2.27%
Asian alone (NH)	0	0.00%
Pacific Islander alone (NH)	0	0.00%
Some Other Race alone (NH)	0	0.00%
Mixed Race/Multi-Racial (NH)	7	5.30%
Hispanic or Latino (any race)	5	3.79%
Total	132	100.00%
