= Concord School District =

Concord School District may refer to a school district in the United States:

- Concord School District (Arkansas)
- Concord School District (New Hampshire)
