= Senator Harriman =

Senator Harriman may refer to:

- Morril Harriman (born 1950), Arkansas State Senate
- Phil Harriman (born 1955), Maine State Senate
- Walter Harriman (politician) (1817–1884), New Hampshire State Senate
