= Rector House =

Historic house in Arkansas, United States

- U.S. National Register of Historic Places
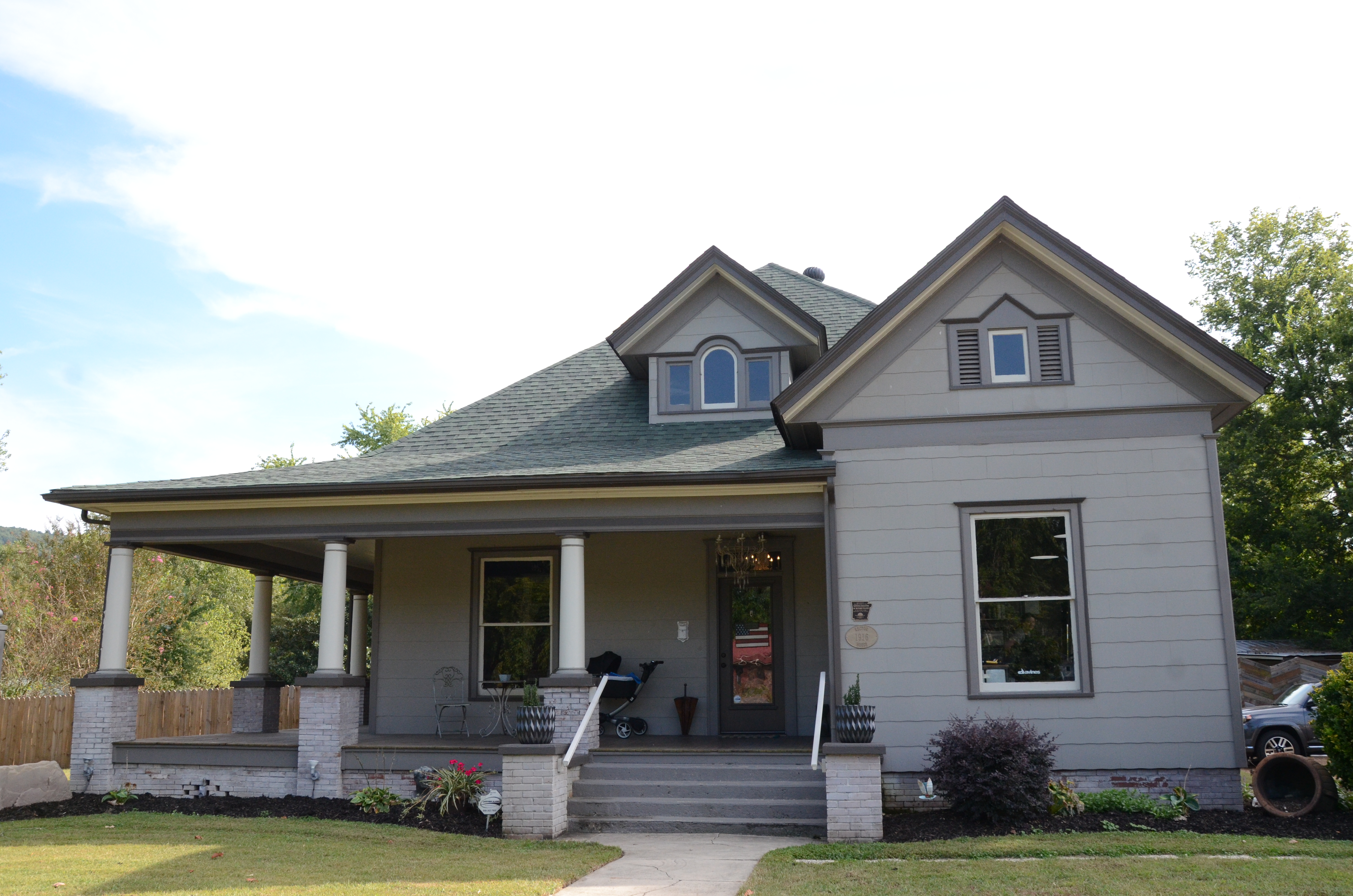

- Location within Arkansas Location within the United States
- Location: 603 W. Quitman St., Heber Springs, Arkansas
- Coordinates: 35°29′29″N 92°2′8″W
- Area: less than one acre
- Built: 1915
- Architectural style: Queen Anne
- NRHP reference No.: 08000486
- Added to NRHP: October 17, 2008

The Rector House is a historic house at 603 West Quitman Street in Heber Springs, Arkansas. It is a roughly rectangular single-story wood-frame structure, with a gable-on-hip roof that is on two sides extended at a lower slope across a wraparound porch. The porch is supported by Tuscan columns set on brick piers. To the right of the main entrance (which is accessed via the porch) is a projecting gabled section, with a small square window in the gable, flanked by vents and topped by a mini-gable. The house was built in 1915–16, and is considered a good example of the "Free Classic" form of Queen Anne architecture.

The house was listed on the National Register of Historic Places in 2008.

== See also ==
- National Register of Historic Places listings in Cleburne County, Arkansas
