= Mike Meyer Disfarmer Gravesite =

Grave in Heber Springs Cemetery, Arkansas

- U.S. National Register of Historic Places
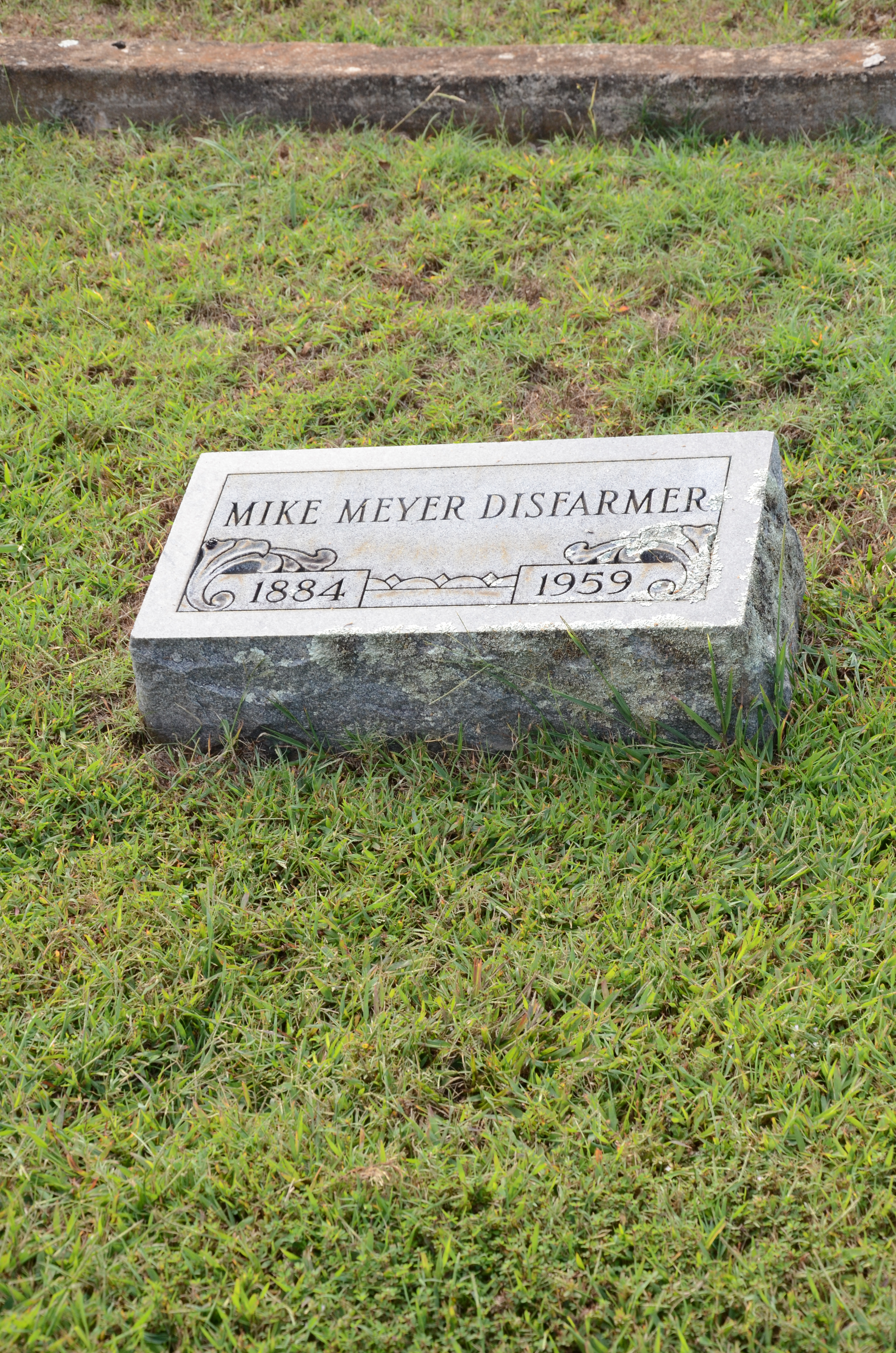

- Location within Arkansas Location within the United States
- Location: In the Heber Springs Cemetery at the NR corner of Oak St. and S. 4th St., Heber Springs, Arkansas
- Coordinates: 35°29′9″N 92°1′54″W
- Area: less than one acre
- Built: 1959
- NRHP reference No.: 08001335
- Added to NRHP: January 21, 2009

The Mike Meyer Disfarmer Gravesite is a historic gravesite in the Heber Springs Cemetery, Heber Springs, Arkansas. The grave is marked by a simple granite marker, bearing the legend "Mike Meyer Disfarmer / 1884–1959", with an egg-and-dart pattern in the bottom center between the dates, and a floral design above each of the dates. It is the only known surviving place associated with Mike Disfarmer, a noted regional portrait photographer. Disfarmer had his studio in Heber Springs, and photographed mainly local subjects. His work was the subject of a major retrospective in New York City in 1976.

The site was listed on the National Register of Historic Places in 2009.

== See also ==
- National Register of Historic Places listings in Cleburne County, Arkansas
