= Cleburne County Farm Cemetery =

Historic cemetery in Arkansas, United States

- U.S. National Register of Historic Places
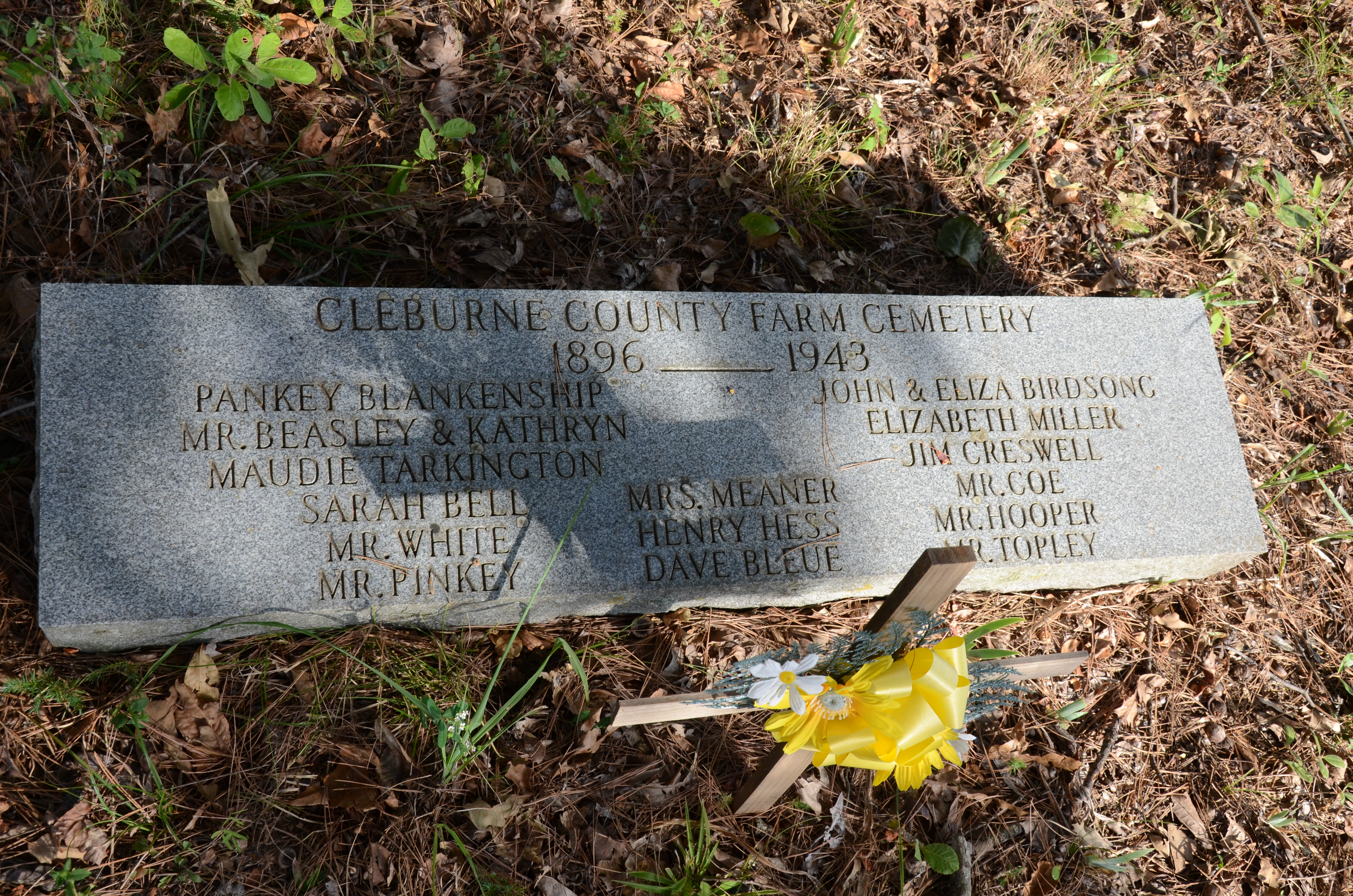

- Location within Arkansas Location within the United States
- Nearest city: Heber Springs, Arkansas
- Coordinates: 35°27′20″N 92°2′15″W
- Area: less than one acre
- Built: 1896
- NRHP reference No.: 05001066
- Added to NRHP: September 28, 2005

The Cleburne County Farm Cemetery is located at Plantation Drive East and Deer Run in Heber Springs, Arkansas. It is a small cemetery, with seventeen graves, ten of which have markers. It is surrounded by a chain-link fence, and there is a commemorative marker. The cemetery saw active use from 1896 to 1943, and is the only surviving element of the county's poor farm, which was used by the county to provide for its indigent population during that time.

The 132 acre "Poor Farm" was established in 1896. From 1935 to 1942 the farm was a Civilian Conservation Corps (CCC) camp and the County Farms was closed. The cemetery was listed on the National Register of Historic Places in 2005.

== See also ==
- National Register of Historic Places listings in Cleburne County, Arkansas
