= Plant, Arkansas =

Plant
- Unincorporated community
- Location in Arkansas Location in the United States
- Coordinates: 35°43′25″N 92°27′38″W
- Country: United States
- State: Arkansas
- County: Van Buren
- Elevation: 1,293 ft (394 m)
- GNIS feature ID: 68688

Plant is an unincorporated community in Van Buren County, Arkansas, United States.

== History ==
A post office called Plant was established in 1895, and remained in operation until 1954. The post office has since disappeared due to decay. It is uncertain why the name "Plant" was applied to this community. The only remaining structure that bears the community name is the Plant Baptist Church and Cemetery, located 4.9 miles east of U.S. Route 65, on the north side of Arkansas Highway 110. The main industry in Plant is cattle husbandry. The area is also known for its wildlife hunting, mainly whitetail deer, turkey, and squirrel. Children in Plant attend the Clinton School District, which is thirteen miles south of the community.
