= Joe Guffey House =

Historic house in Arkansas, United States

- U.S. National Register of Historic Places
- Location within Arkansas Location within the United States
- Location: AR 110, Old Lexington, Arkansas
- Coordinates: 35°43′12″N 92°24′34″W
- Area: less than one acre
- Built: 1900
- Architectural style: T-shape
- MPS: Stone County MRA
- NRHP reference No.: 85002211
- Added to NRHP: September 17, 1985

The Joe Guffey House is a historic house on the north side of Arkansas Highway 110 in rural southwestern Stone County, Arkansas. Located south of Arlberg in an area known as Old Lexington, it is a T-shaped single-story wood-frame structure, with a gable roof and foundation of stone piers. A tall gabled projection covers a porch supported by four square posts, with a pedimented gable end that has wide boards with a diamond pattern in the center, and applied bargeboard trim near the peak. The building corners are pilastered, and an ell extends to its rear. The house was built about 1900, and was listed on the National Register of Historic Places in 1985 for its architectural significance.

== See also ==
- National Register of Historic Places listings in Stone County, Arkansas
