= Woman's Community Club Band Shell =

- U.S. National Register of Historic Places
- U.S. Historic district – Contributing property
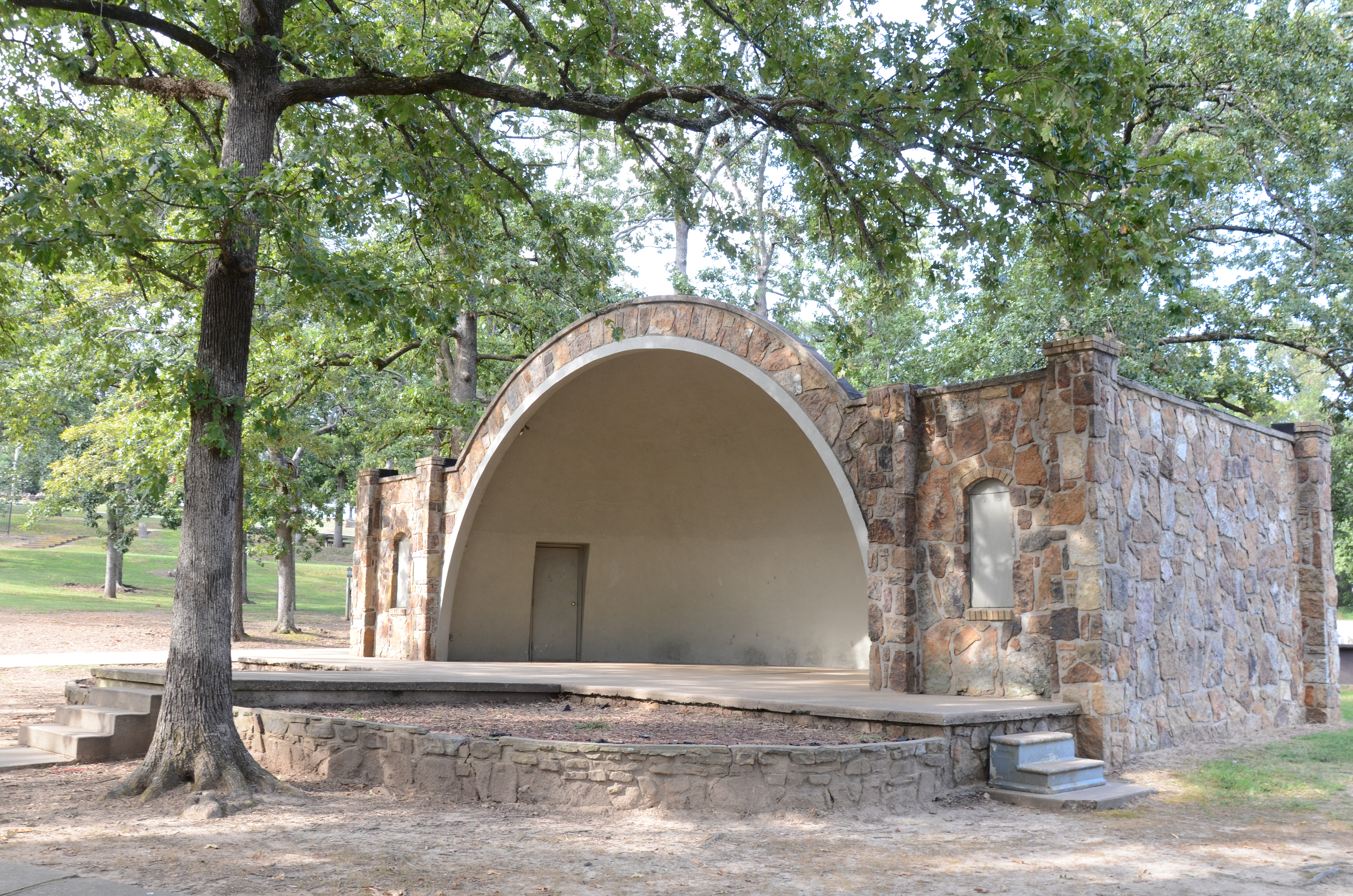

- Location within Arkansas Location within the United States
- Location: NE corner of Spring Park, Heber Springs, Arkansas
- Coordinates: 35°29′34″N 92°1′33″W
- Area: less than one acre
- Built: 1933
- Architect: King, Leo
- Architectural style: Rustic
- Part of: Heber Springs Commercial Historic District (ID09000266)
- NRHP reference No.: 94000849

Significant dates
- Added to NRHP: August 16, 1994
- Designated CP: May 1, 2009

The Woman's Community Club Band Shell is a historic open-air band shell in Spring Park, a public park in downtown Heber Springs, Arkansas. It is a roughly rectangular structure, built out of local fieldstone, with the main half-dome shell formed out of concrete. The sides of the shell are articulated by pilasters, which also appear at the building corners. The rear of the building is enclosed, provide dressing room space for performers. The shell was built in 1933, replacing an older wood-frame performance pavilion.

The band shell was listed on the National Register of Historic Places in 1994.

== See also ==
- National Register of Historic Places listings in Cleburne County, Arkansas
