= Dr. Cyrus F. Crosby House =

Historic house in Arkansas, United States

- U.S. National Register of Historic Places
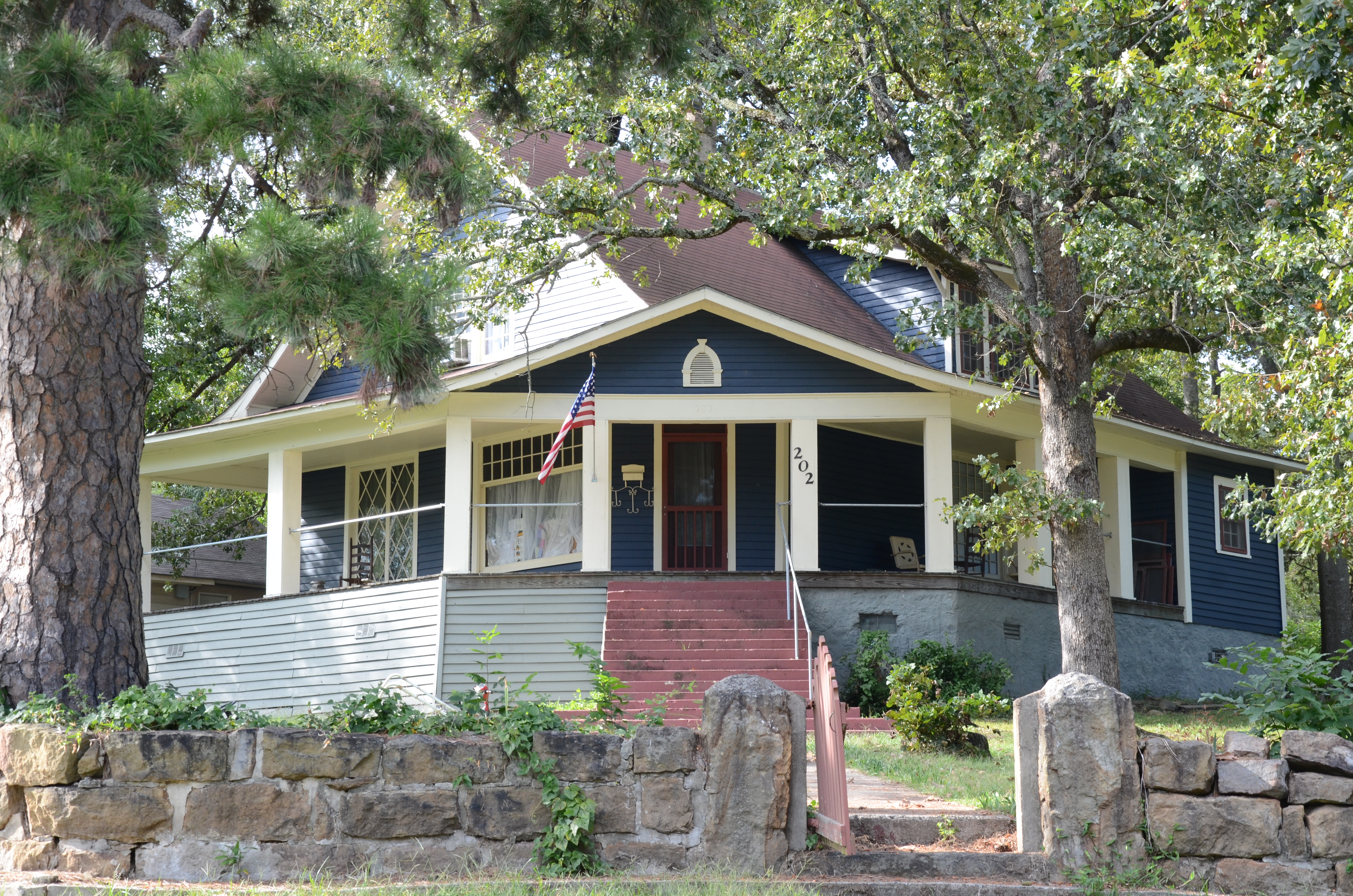

- Location within Arkansas Location within the United States
- Location: 202 N. Broadway St., Heber Springs, Arkansas
- Coordinates: 35°29′33″N 92°1′40″W
- Area: less than one acre
- Architectural style: Plain Traditional
- NRHP reference No.: 93001258
- Added to NRHP: November 19, 1993

The Dr. Cyrus F. Crosby House is a historic house at 202 North Broadway Street in Heber Springs, Arkansas. It is a 1 1/2-story wood-frame structure, with a broad gabled roof and weatherboard siding. The roof is studded with gabled dormers, and shelters a wraparound porch supported by square posts. Although the overall style of the house is Craftsman, the porch's soffits are enclosed in the style of the Prairie School. The house was built in 1912 for a doctor, who had a medical practice and drug store in the city, and also engaged in an unsuccessful attempt to promote the area's natural mineral springs as a resort destination.

The house was listed on the National Register of Historic Places in 1993.

== See also ==
- National Register of Historic Places listings in Cleburne County, Arkansas
