= Concord, Arkansas =

- Town
- Location of Concord in Cleburne County, Arkansas.
- Coordinates: 35°39′45″N 91°51′48″W
- Country: United States
- State: Arkansas
- County: Cleburne

Area
  - Total: 3.08 sq mi (7.99 km^{2})
  - Land: 3.08 sq mi (7.98 km^{2})
  - Water: 0.0039 sq mi (0.01 km^{2})
- Elevation: 1,004 ft (306 m)

Population (2020)
  - Total: 190
  - Estimate (2025): 193 ▲
  - Density: 61.7/sq mi (23.82/km^{2})
- Time zone: UTC-6 (Central (CST))
  - Summer (DST): UTC-5 (CDT)
- ZIP code: 72523
- Area code: 870
- FIPS code: 05-15100
- GNIS feature ID: 2406304

Concord is a town in Cleburne County, Arkansas, United States. The population was 190 at the 2020 census.

== Geography ==
Concord is located near the northeast corner of Cleburne County. Arkansas Highway 25 passes through the town, leading southwest 22 miles (35 km) to Heber Springs, the county seat, and northeast 18 miles (29 km) to Batesville.

According to the United States Census Bureau, the town of Concord has a total area of 2.8 square miles (7.3 km^{2}), of which 0.004 sq mi (0.01 km^{2}), or 0.14%, is water.

== Demographics ==
Historical population
Census	Pop.	Note	%±
1970	163		—
1980	234		43.6%
1990	262		12.0%
2000	255		−2.7%
2010	244		−4.3%
2020	190		−22.1%
2025 (est.)	193	▲	1.6%
U.S. Decennial Census; 2014 Estimate

As of the 2000 census, 255 people, 106 households, and 78 families were residing in the town. The population density was 34.8 people/km^{2} (90 people/mi^{2}). The 119 housing units had an average density of 16.2 units/km^{2} (42 units/mi^{2}). The racial makeup of the town was 98.82% White, 0.78% Native American, and 0.39% from two or more races. About 1.96% of the population were Hispanics or Latinos of any race.

Of the 106 households, 30.2% had children under 18 living with them, 62.3% were couples living together, 9.4% had a female householder with no husband present, and 26.4% were not families. About 24.5% of all households were made up of individuals, and 14.2% had someone living alone who was 65 or older. The average household size was 2.41 and the average family size was 2.88.

In the town, the age distribution was 23.1% under 18, 5.5% from 18 to 24, 25.5% from 25 to 44, 27.8% from 45 to 64, and 18.0% who were 65 or older. The median age was 42 years. For every 100 females, there were 102.4 males. For every 100 females 18 and over, there were 92.2 males.

The median income for a household was $29,844 and for a family was $35,625. Males had a median income of $27,708 versus $8,906 for females. The per capita income for the town was $13,283.13. About 9.3% of families and 13.1% of the population were below the poverty line, including 15.6% of those under 18 and 12.8% of those 65 or over; 78% of the population receive TANF.

== Education ==
Public education of early childhood, elementary and secondary school students is primarily provided by the Concord School District, which leads to graduation from Concord High School. The school mascot is the Pirate with purple and gold serving as the school colors.
