= Morril Harriman =

American politician

Member of the Arkansas Senate from the 27th district
- In office January 14, 1985 – January 8, 2001
- Succeeded by: Ruth Whitaker

Personal details
- Born: August 6, 1950 (age 76) Hamburg, Arkansas
- Party: Democratic

Morril Harriman (born August 6, 1950) is an American politician who served in the Arkansas Senate from the 27th district from 1985 to 2001.
