= Drasco, Arkansas =

- Census-designated place
- Location within Arkansas Location within the United States
- Coordinates: 35°38′02″N 91°56′30″W
- Country: United States
- State: Arkansas
- County: Cleburne
- Elevation: 991 ft (302 m)

Population (2020)
  - Total: 144
- Time zone: UTC-6 (Central (CST))
  - Summer (DST): UTC-5 (CDT)
- GNIS feature ID: 2805638

Drasco is an unincorporated community and census-designated place (CDP) in Cleburne County, Arkansas, United States, with a ZIP code of 72530. Drasco lies just northeast of Greers Ferry Lake and includes the lakeside community of Tannenbaum.

It was first listed as a CDP in the 2020 census with a population of 144.

== Education ==
Public education for elementary and secondary students is provided by Concord School District, which operates Concord Elementary School and Concord High School (located in Concord).

== Demographics ==
Historical population
Census	Pop.	Note	%±
2020	144		—
U.S. Decennial Census; 2020

=== 2020 census ===
Drasco CDP, Arkansas – Racial and ethnic composition Note: the US Census treats Hispanic/Latino as an ethnic category. This table excludes Latinos from the racial categories and assigns them to a separate category. Hispanics/Latinos may be of any race.
Race / Ethnicity (NH = Non-Hispanic)	Pop 2020	% 2020
White alone (NH)	128	88.89%
Black or African American alone (NH)	1	0.69%
Native American or Alaska Native alone (NH)	1	0.69%
Asian alone (NH)	0	0.00%
Pacific Islander alone (NH)	1	0.69%
Some other race alone (NH)	0	0.00%
Multiracial (NH)	9	6.25%
Hispanic or Latino (any race)	4	2.78%
Total	144	100.00%
