= Old Lexington, Arkansas =

- Unincorporated community
- Location within Arkansas Location within the United States
- Coordinates: 35°43′11″N 92°24′40″W
- Country: United States
- State: Arkansas
- County: Stone
- Elevation: 1,345 ft (410 m)
- Time zone: UTC-6 (Central (CST))
  - Summer (DST): UTC-5 (CDT)
- Area code: 870
- GNIS feature ID: 77906

Old Lexington is an unincorporated community in Stone County, Arkansas, United States. Old Lexington is located on Arkansas Highway 110, 6.8 miles (10.9 km) northwest of Shirley. The Joe Guffey House, which is listed on the National Register of Historic Places, is located in Old Lexington.
