= Heber Springs School District =

School district in Arkansas, United States

Location
- 1100 West Pine Street; Heber Springs, Arkansas 72543 United States

District information
- Grades: K–12
- Superintendent: Scott Jennings
- Accreditation: Arkansas Department of Education
- Schools: 3
- NCES District ID: 0507560

Students and staff
- Students: 1,513 (2021-2022)
- Teachers: 124.09 (on FTE basis)(2021-2022)
- Student–teacher ratio: 12.19 (2021-2022)

Other information
- Website: www.heberschools.org

Heber Springs School District is a public school district based in Heber Springs, Arkansas, United States. The Heber Springs School District provides early childhood, elementary and secondary education for more than 1,500 kindergarten through grade 12 students at its three facilities within Cleburne County, Arkansas. The district is accredited by the Arkansas Department of Education (ADE).

The district includes Heber Springs and almost every part of Tumbling Shoals.

== Schools ==
=== Secondary schools ===
- Heber Springs High School, serving approximately 500 students in grades 9 through 12.
- Heber Springs Middle School, serving approximately 400 students in grades 6 through 8.

=== Elementary schools ===
- Heber Springs Elementary School, serving approximately 800 students in kindergarten through grade 5.
