= Heber Springs High School =

Location
- 1100 West Pine Street; Heber Springs, Arkansas 72543; United States
- Coordinates: 35°29′48″N 92°2′19″W

Information
- School type: Public comprehensive
- Status: Open
- School district: Heber Springs School District
- Superintendent: Scott Jennings
- CEEB code: 041060
- NCES School ID: 050756000467
- Principal: Shannon Martin
- Teaching staff: 62.98 (on FTE basis)
- Grades: 9–12
- Enrollment: 478 (2023-2024)
- Student to teacher ratio: 7.59
- Education system: ADE Smart Core
- Classes offered: Regular, Advanced Placement (AP)
- Colors: Red and white
- Athletics conference: 4A Region 2
- Mascot: Panther
- Team name: Heber Springs Panthers
- Accreditation: ADE
- Feeder schools: Heber Springs Middle School (6–8)
- Website: www.heberschools.org/o/high-school

Heber Springs High School is a comprehensive public high school located in the remote town of Heber Springs, Arkansas, United States. The school provides secondary education for students in grades 9 through 12. It is one of five public high schools in Cleburne County, Arkansas, and the sole high school administered by the Heber Springs School District.

The district includes Heber Springs and almost all of Tumbling Shoals.

== Academics ==
Heber Springs High School is accredited by the Arkansas Department of Education (ADE). The assumed course of study follows the Smart Core curriculum developed by the ADE, which requires students complete at least 22 units prior to graduation. Students complete regular coursework and exams and may take Advanced Placement (AP) courses and exam with the opportunity to receive college credit.

== Athletics ==
The Heber Springs High School mascot and athletic emblem is the Panther with red and white serving as the school colors.

The Heber Springs Panthers compete in interscholastic activities within the 4A Classification via the 4A Region 2 Conference, as administered by the Arkansas Activities Association. The Panthers field teams in football, volleyball, cross country (boys/girls), bowling (boys/girls), golf (boys/girls), basketball (boys/girls), baseball, softball, track and field (boys/girls), and cheer.

== Notable alumni ==
- Brandon Bell (recording engineer), Grammy Award winning record engineer, mix engineer and producer
- Tommy Land, Arkansas Commissioner of State Lands
- Ruth Whitaker, member of the Arkansas State Senate from 2001 to 2013.
