= Mike Disfarmer =

American photographer (1884–1959)

- Mike Disfarmer (1884–1959)
- Born: Mike Meyer; 1884; Indiana
- Died: 1959 (aged 74–75); Heber Springs, Arkansas
- Occupation: photographer
- Years active: 1915-1959
- Known for: portraiture in rural Arkansas

Mike Disfarmer (born Mike Meyer, 1884–1959) was an American photographer known posthumously for his portraits of everyday people in rural Arkansas from the 1920s to the 1950s.

Like photographer Vivian Maier and illustrator Henry Darger, Disfarmer was unrecognized during his lifetime and out of touch with his relatives — receiving notoriety only after his death.

When his stark, realist photographs, noted examples of outsider art, were rediscovered in the 1970s, they were recognized for their artistic merit, especially given that the photographer himself was self-taught, without formal training or influence from a larger art context.

== Background ==
Born Mike Meyer in Indiana to German American parents, he moved with his family to Arkansas in 1892. He later moved to the town of Heber Springs, Arkansas at the age of thirty, where roughly a decade later he would build and operate his photography studio.

Meyer changed his name to Disfarmer while in his 50s, claiming that he was adopted by the Meyers (Disfarmer is a direct reference to Meyer, an archaic German term for farmer). Disfarmer never married, and he lived alone in the photography studio until his death in 1959. While there is speculation that he was eccentric and even insane, so little is known about his personal life that there is no evidence for these assertions other than his photographs.

Disfarmer remained a lifelong bachelor who liked "ice cream, his fiddle, the occasional beer," renouncing his relatives, and dying intestate in 1959 at age 75 in Heber Springs "in obscurity." his grave placed on the National Register of Historic Places. His estate included thousands of negatives, and assets over $18,000 that was divided among his siblings and their heirs. The numerous negatives were subsequently sold to a former mayor of Heber Springs, who in turn sold the negatives for a nominal sum to Peter Miller, a newspaper editor and lawyer.

== Career ==
Disfarmer opened a photographic studio in Haber Springs around 1915. His photographs were simple, postcard-sized glass plate negatives, costing only 50 cents for three photographs. Subjects were instructed to face the camera directly and not smile. His subjects are the small-town residents of Heber Springs as well as tourists, photographed without props, typically against a plain backdrop.

Disfarmer produced a consistent stream of portraits that captured the essence of a particular community and time.

== Discovery, litigation and legacy ==
Peter Miller subsequently spent a year, while on a bicentennial grant, cleaning, preserving and cataloging the negatives. Subsequently, two exhibitions of Disfarmer's own prints took place.

93 relatives would ultimately settle a six-year legal litigation against the Arkansas Museum of Fine Arts Foundation to determine control of the Disfarmer archives; the copyright as well as the artist's legacy — giving the heirs the copyright and possession of nearly "3,000 of glass-plate negatives and hundreds of posthumous prints."

In 2008, a picture of Disfarmer was used on the 80th Academy Awards telecast as the alleged portrait of Roderick Jaynes, the film editing pseudonym of the Coen brothers, who was nominated at that ceremony for editing the Coens' film No Country for Old Men. Disfarmer's photo was supplied to the Academy of Motion Picture Arts and Sciences by the Coens after Jaynes' nomination.

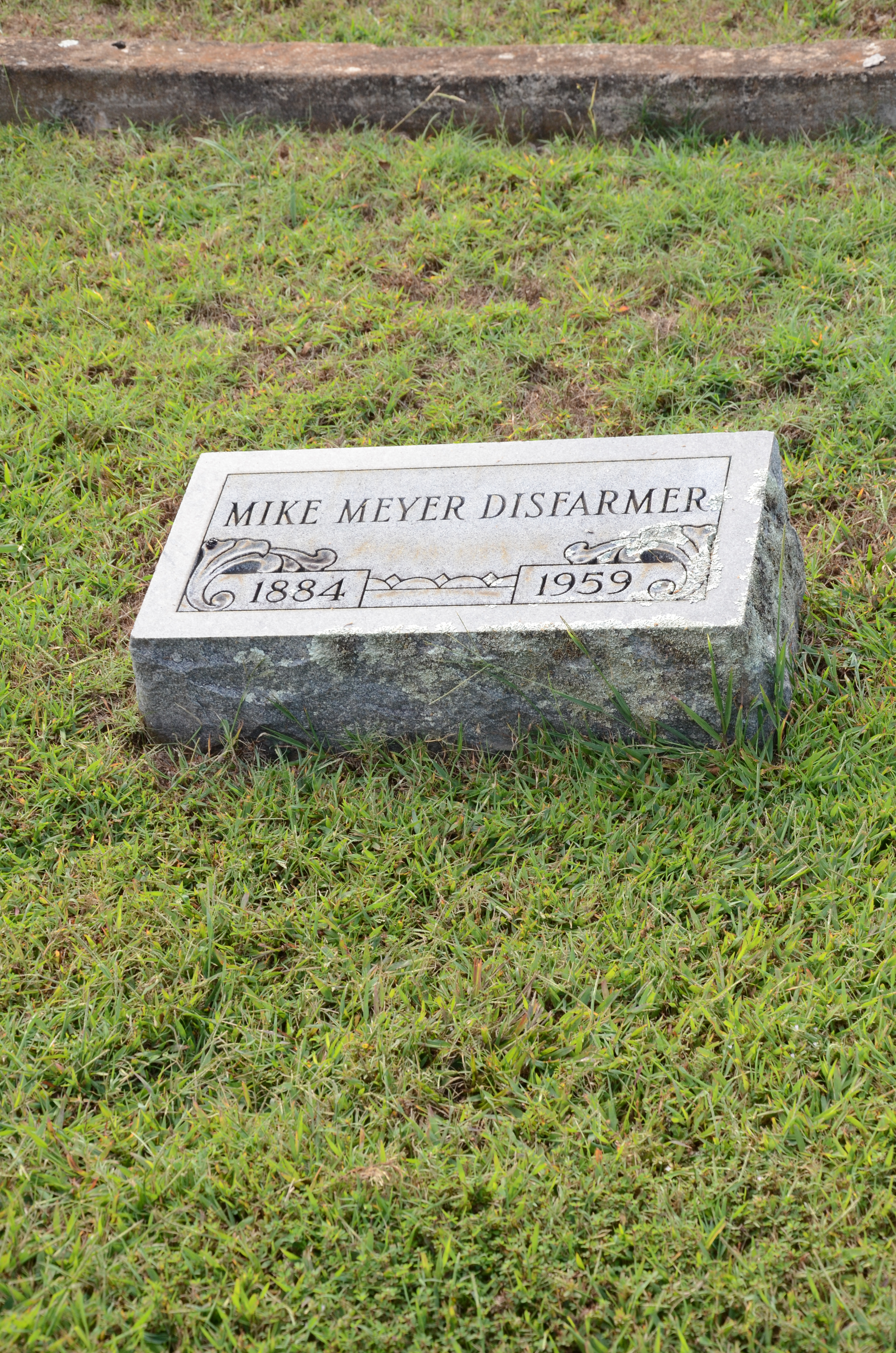
Disfarmer gravesite in Heber Springs Cemetery

In 2009, he was the subject of a puppet-theater production by Dan Hurlin at St. Ann's Warehouse in New York City. His life was an inspiration for guitarist Bill Frisell, who was commissioned by the Wexner Center for the Arts to write the score to accompany a retrospective of Disfarmer's work.

== Books ==
- Disfarmer, Mike. Disfarmer: The Heber Springs Portraits, 1939–1946. Addison House
- Disfarmer, Mike, Steven Kasher, and Alan Trachtenberg. Original Disfarmer Photographs. Göttingen: Steidl, 2005
- Disfarmer, Mike. Heber Springs Portraits: Continuity and Change in the World Disfarmer Photographed. University of New Mexico Press
