= Wilburn School District =

Defunct school district in Arkansas, United States

Wilburn School District No. 44 or Wilburn Public Schools was a school district headquartered in Wilburn, an unincorporated area in Cleburne County, Arkansas. It operated Wilburn Public School, which had elementary and high school divisions. The mascot was the wildcat.

The district had an area of 68 square miles (180 km^{2}).

On July 1, 2004, the Wilburn School District consolidated into the Concord School District.
