= Hugh L. King House =

Historic house in Arkansas, United States

- U.S. National Register of Historic Places
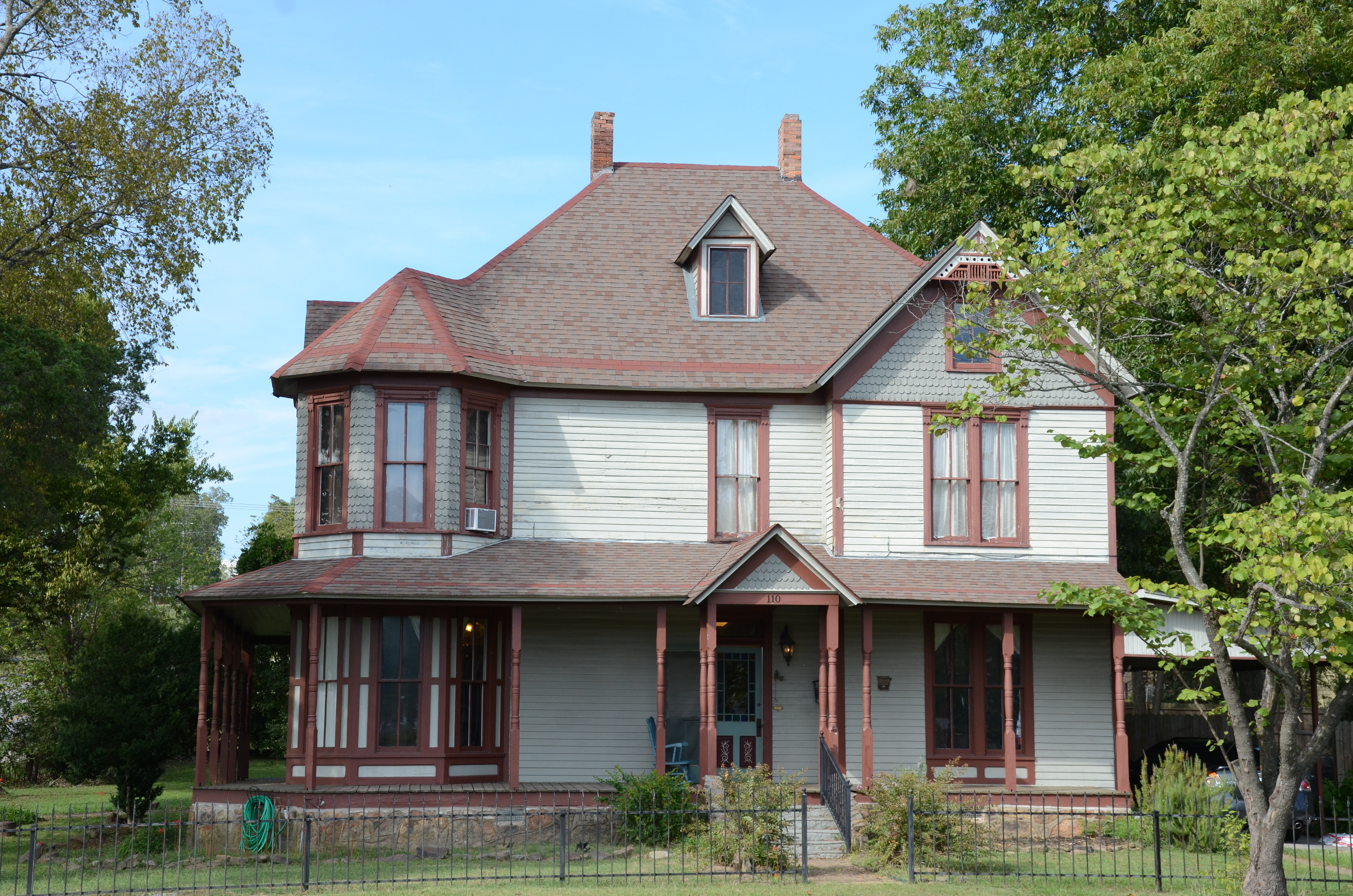

- Location within Arkansas Location within the United States
- Location: 110 W. Spring St., Heber Springs, Arkansas
- Coordinates: 35°29′34″N 92°1′47″W
- Area: less than one acre
- Built: 1894
- Built by: Hugh L. King
- Architectural style: Italianate, Queen Anne
- NRHP reference No.: 92001224
- Added to NRHP: September 8, 1992

The Hugh L. King House is a historic house at 110 West Spring Street in Heber Springs, Arkansas. It is a 2 1/2-story L-shaped wood-frame house, with an eclectic combination of Queen Anne and Italianate features. It has a two-story polygonal turreted projection at one corner, and a wraparound porch with delicate turned posts. Although most of the exterior is finished in weatherboard, portions are finished in decorative cut shingles. The oldest portion of the house was built about 1882; it achieved its present form and style c. 1893–4 with a major addition.

The house was listed on the National Register of Historic Places in 1992.

== See also ==
- National Register of Historic Places listings in Cleburne County, Arkansas
