= Concord School District (Arkansas) =

School district in Arkansas

Location
- 10920 North Heber Springs Road; Concord, Arkansas 72523-0100 United States

District information
- Grades: PK–12
- Accreditation: Arkansas Department of Education
- Schools: 2
- NCES District ID: 0504560

Students and staff
- Students: 505
- Teachers: 39.62 (on FTE basis)
- Staff: 100.62 (on FTE basis)
- Student–teacher ratio: 12.75
- District mascot: Pirate
- Colors: Purple; Gold

Other information
- Website: www.concordschools.org

Concord School District is a public school district based in Concord, Arkansas, United States. The school district encompasses 203.23 square miles (526.4 km^{2}) of land.

In Cleburne County the district includes Concord, Drasco, Wilburn, and a very small portion of Tumbling Shoals. The district also includes portions of Independence County and Stone County. It also serves two unincorporated areas: Locust Grove and Ida.

The district proves comprehensive education for more than 500 prekindergarten through grade 12 students while employing more than 100 teachers and staff. The district and its schools are accredited by the Arkansas Department of Education.

== History ==
On July 1, 2004, the Wilburn School District consolidated into the Concord School District.

== Schools ==
- Concord High School, located in Concord and serving more than 175 students in grades 7 through 12.
- Concord Elementary School, located in Concord and serving more than 350 students in prekindergarten through grade 6.
