= Ruth Whitaker =

American politician (1936–2014)

Member of the Arkansas Senate
- In office 2001–2013

Personal details
- Born: December 13, 1936
- Died: November 10, 2014 (aged 77)
- Party: Republican

Ruth Reed Whitaker (December 13, 1936 – November 10, 2014) was a Republican member of the Arkansas Senate, with service from 2001 to 2013.

== Biography ==
Born in Blytheville in Mississippi County, Arkansas, Whitaker graduated from Heber Springs High School in Cleburne County and then attended Hendrix College in Conway, Arkansas. She resided in Fort Smith in Sebastian County and Cedarville in Crawford County. Prior to her election to the state Senate, Whitaker served on the Cedarville City Council.

She was married to Dr. T. J. Whittaker and they had two children. She died in Fayetteville, Arkansas.
