= Cleburne County Courthouse (Alabama) =

- U.S. National Register of Historic Places
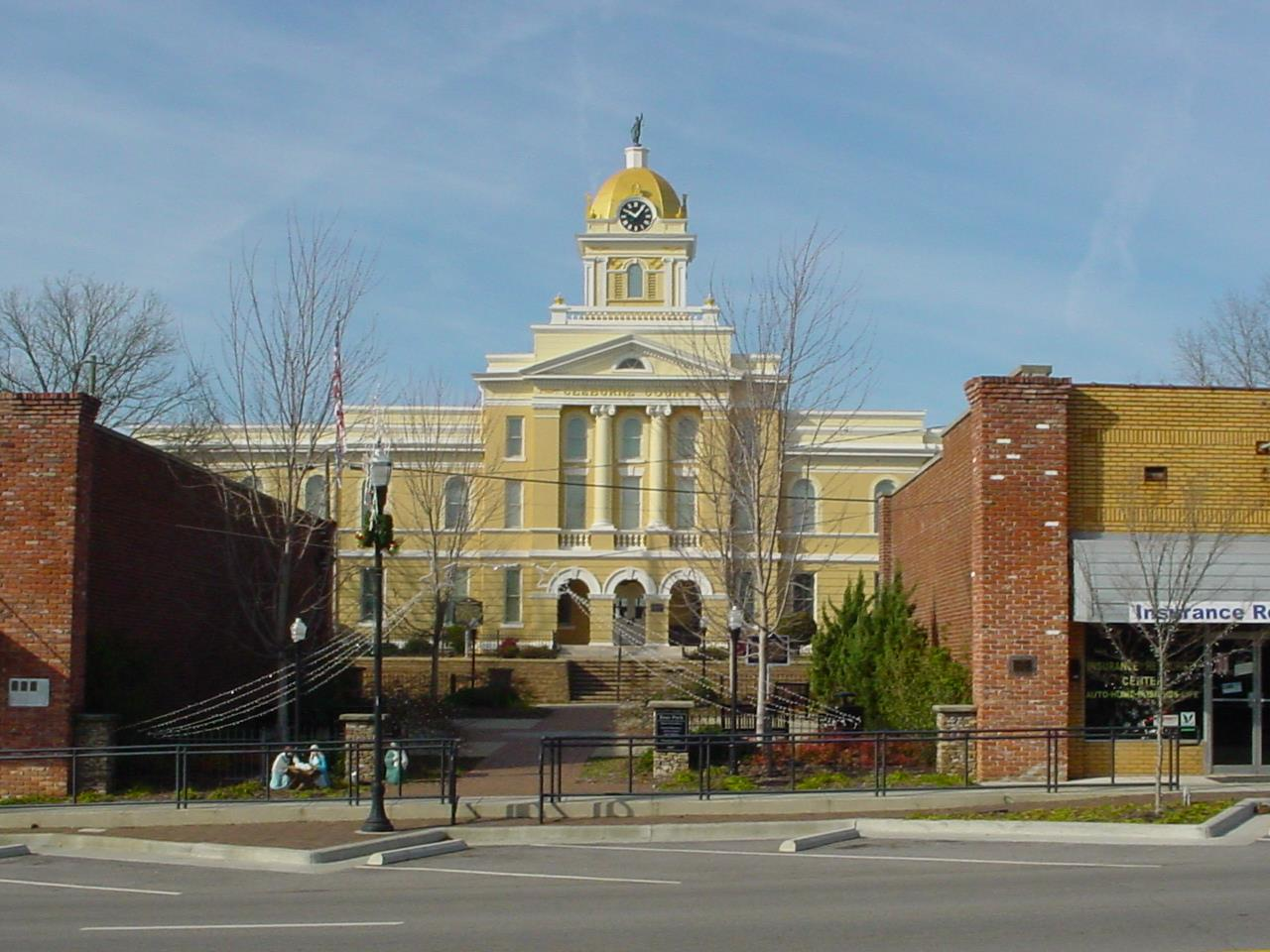
- The Cleburne County Courthouse in August 2013
- Interactive map of Cleburne County Courthouse
- Location: Vickory St., Heflin, Alabama
- Built: 1907
- Architect: C. W. Carlton
- Architectural style: Classical Revival
- NRHP reference No.: 76000317
- Added to NRHP: June 22, 1976

The Cleburne County Courthouse is a Classical Revival courthouse in Heflin, Alabama, United States. Built in 1907, it was listed on the National Register of Historic Places in 1976.

== History ==
In March 1905, residents of Heflin and southern Cleburne County petitioned governor William Jelks to move the county seat from Edwardsville to Heflin. A referendum was held in December 1905, and Heflin won by 88 votes. Despite legal battles over the move, ground was broken on a new courthouse in Heflin, with the cornerstone being laid on July 4, 1907. The wings of the courthouse were expanded in 1938 using funds from the Public Works Administration.

== Architecture ==
The Neoclassical style was popular for public buildings in the early 20th century. The courthouse is a two-story brick structure with a central pavilion and wings. The first floor of the façade has three arched openings which support a temple form on the upper floor consisting of plain pilasters flanking Ionic pilasters supporting a shallow pediment. Arched windows are in the open spaces between pilasters. The pavilion is topped with a domed clock tower. The wings, added in 1938, are recessed 2 feet (0.61 m) from the façade.

The first floor plan is T-shaped, and mainly houses offices. The courtroom dominates the second floor. Interior details consist of mosaic tile floors and heavy, dark wood balustrades on the stairs and in the courtroom.
