= Tumbling Shoals, Arkansas =

- Census-designated place
- Location of Tumbling Shoals in Cleburne County, Arkansas.

- Location within Arkansas
- Coordinates: 35°32′31″N 91°59′03″W
- Country: United States
- State: Arkansas
- County: Cleburne
- Township: Peter Creek

Area
  - Total: 11.26 sq mi (29.16 km^{2})
  - Land: 10.12 sq mi (26.22 km^{2})
  - Water: 1.14 sq mi (2.94 km^{2})
- Elevation: 686 ft (209 m)

Population (2020)
  - Total: 902
  - Density: 89/sq mi (34.4/km^{2})
- Time zone: UTC-6 (Central (CST))
  - Summer (DST): UTC-5 (CDT)
- ZIP code: 72546, 72581
- Area code: 501
- GNIS feature ID: 2612133

Tumbling Shoals is a census-designated place in Cleburne County, Arkansas, United States. Per the 2020 census, the population was 902.

== Demographics ==
Historical population
Census	Pop.	Note	%±
2010	978		—
2020	902		−7.8%
U.S. Decennial Census; 2010 2020

=== 2020 census ===
Tumbling Shoals CDP, Arkansas – Racial and ethnic composition Note: the US Census treats Hispanic/Latino as an ethnic category. This table excludes Latinos from the racial categories and assigns them to a separate category. Hispanics/Latinos may be of any race.
Race / Ethnicity (NH = Non-Hispanic)	Pop 2010	Pop 2020	% 2010	% 2020
White alone (NH)	946	843	96.73%	93.46%
Black or African American alone (NH)	4	0	0.41%	0.00%
Native American or Alaska Native alone (NH)	5	0	0.51%	0.00%
Asian alone (NH)	5	0	0.51%	0.00%
Pacific Islander alone (NH)	1	0	0.10%	0.00%
Some Other Race alone (NH)	0	3	0.00%	0.33%
Mixed Race or Multi-Racial (NH)	5	36	0.51%	3.99%
Hispanic or Latino (any race)	12	20	1.23%	2.22%
Total	978	902	100.00%	100.00%

== Education ==
Almost all of Tumbling Shoals is served by the Heber Springs School District to provide public elementary and secondary education to students; that district leads to graduation from Heber Springs High School.

A small section coincides with the Concord Public Schools.
