= T.E. Olmstead & Son Funeral Home =

- U.S. National Register of Historic Places
- U.S. Historic district – Contributing property
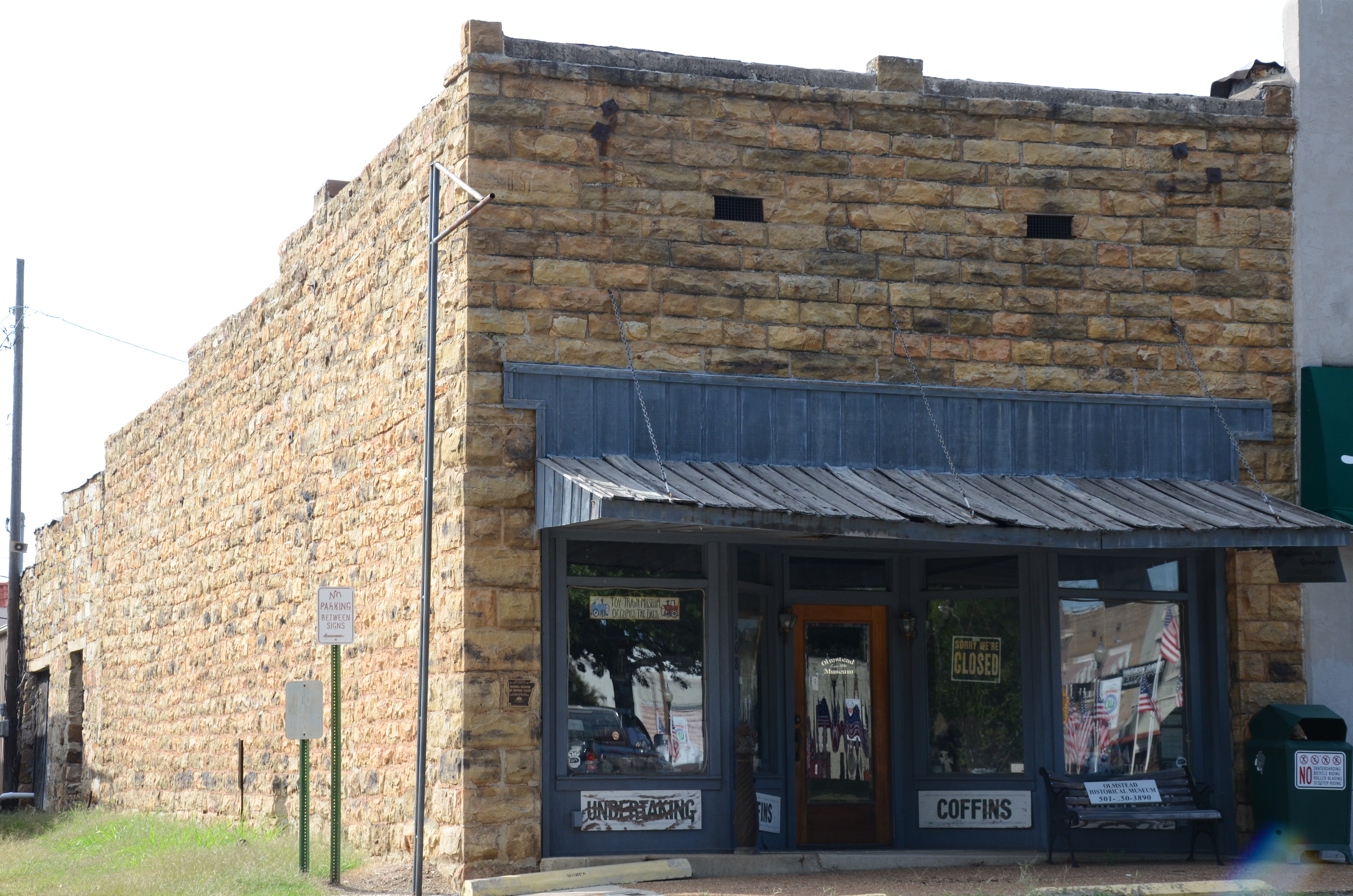

- Location within Arkansas Location within the United States
- Location: 108 S. Fourth St., Heber Springs, Arkansas
- Coordinates: 35°29′29″N 92°1′58″W
- Area: less than one acre
- Architectural style: Ozark Cut-stone Commercial
- Part of: Heber Springs Commercial Historic District (ID09000266)
- NRHP reference No.: 95001438

Significant dates
- Added to NRHP: December 13, 1995
- Designated CP: May 1, 2009

The T.E. Olmstead & Son Funeral Home is a historic commercial building at 108 South Fourth Street in Heber Springs, Arkansas. It is a single-story stone structure, with a parapeted sloping roof. It has a single storefront, with a recessed entry flanked by plate glass display windows. Built in 1910, it is the city's only funeral home, and one of its early stone commercial buildings.

The building was listed on the National Register of Historic Places in 1995.

== See also ==
- National Register of Historic Places listings in Cleburne County, Arkansas
