= Heber Springs Commercial Historic District =

Historic district in Arkansas, United States

- U.S. National Register of Historic Places
- U.S. Historic district
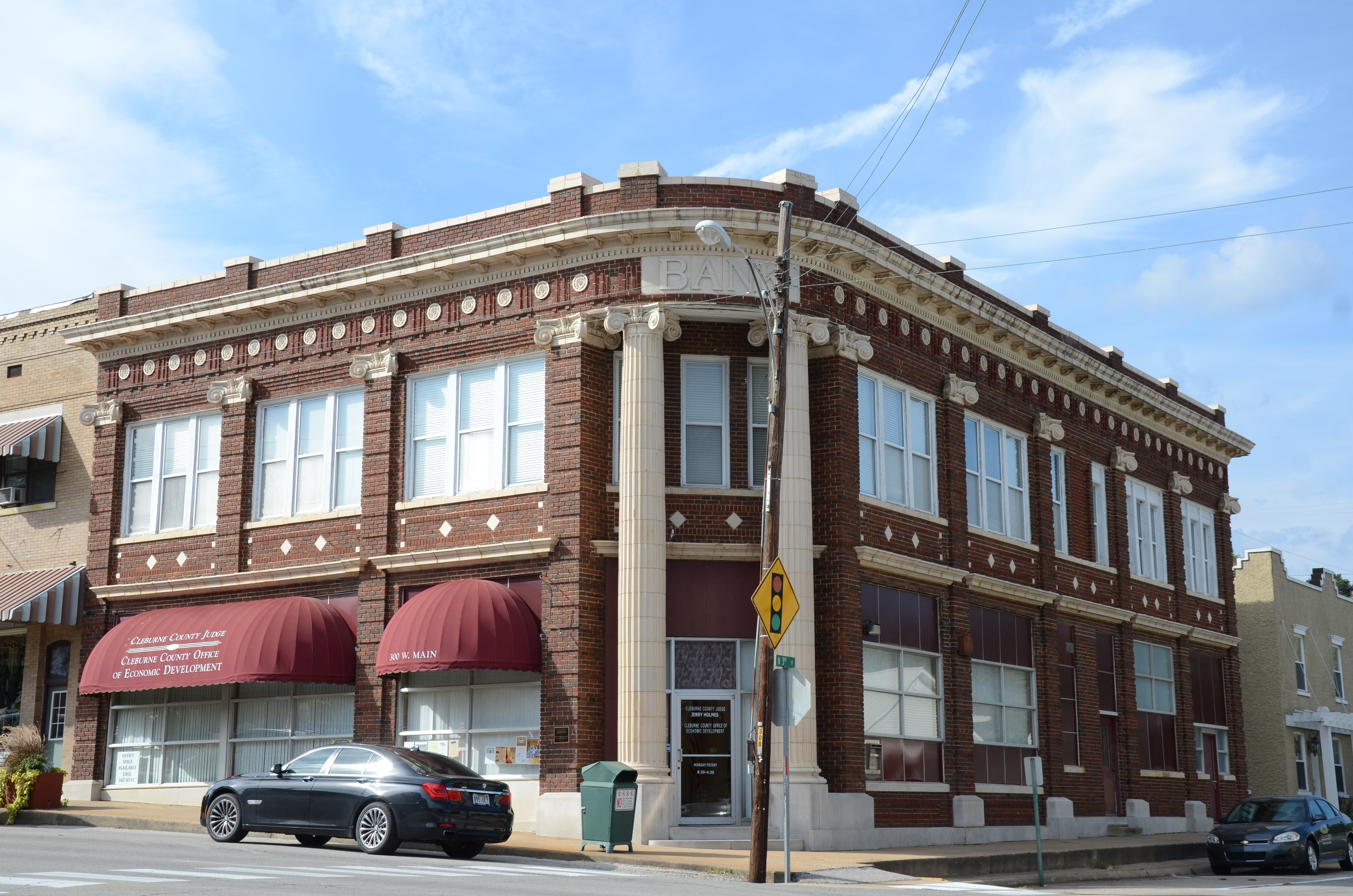

- Location within Arkansas Location within the United States
- Location: 100, 200 blocks E. Main St., 100-500 blocks of W. Main St., 100 block of N. and S. 3rd and N. and S. 4th Sts., Heber Springs, Arkansas
- Coordinates: 35°29′29″N 92°1′46″W
- Area: 31.5 acres (12.7 ha)
- Built: 1914
- Architect: multiple, including Clyde A Ferrell, Charles L. Thompson, Louis A. Simon
- Architectural style: Classical Revival, Early Commercial, Moderne
- NRHP reference No.: 09000266
- Added to NRHP: May 1, 2009

The Heber Springs Commercial Historic District encompasses the early commercial heart of Heber Springs, Arkansas. The district extends along Main Street, between Broadway and 6th Street, including several buildings along some of the cross streets. The area was developed beginning in 1881, and grew in the late 19th and early 20th centuries, featuring a diversity of commercial architecture from that period. Prominent buildings include the Cleburne County Courthouse (1914) and the Morton Building at 101 South 3rd Street, the city's oldest surviving commercial building (1895).

The district was listed on the National Register of Historic Places in 2009. It includes several individually listed properties, including the courthouse, the T.E. Olmstead & Son Funeral Home, and the Woman's Community Club Band Shell in Spring Park.

== See also ==
- National Register of Historic Places listings in Cleburne County, Arkansas
