= Sugarloaf Mountain (Cleburne County, Arkansas) =

Mountain in Arkansas, U.S.

Sugarloaf Mountain is a hiking and mountain biking destination located in Cleburne County, Arkansas, east of the city of Heber Springs, Arkansas. It is 690 feet tall, and is topped by an Atoka formation, a geologic formation sequence of sandstone, siltstone, and shale.

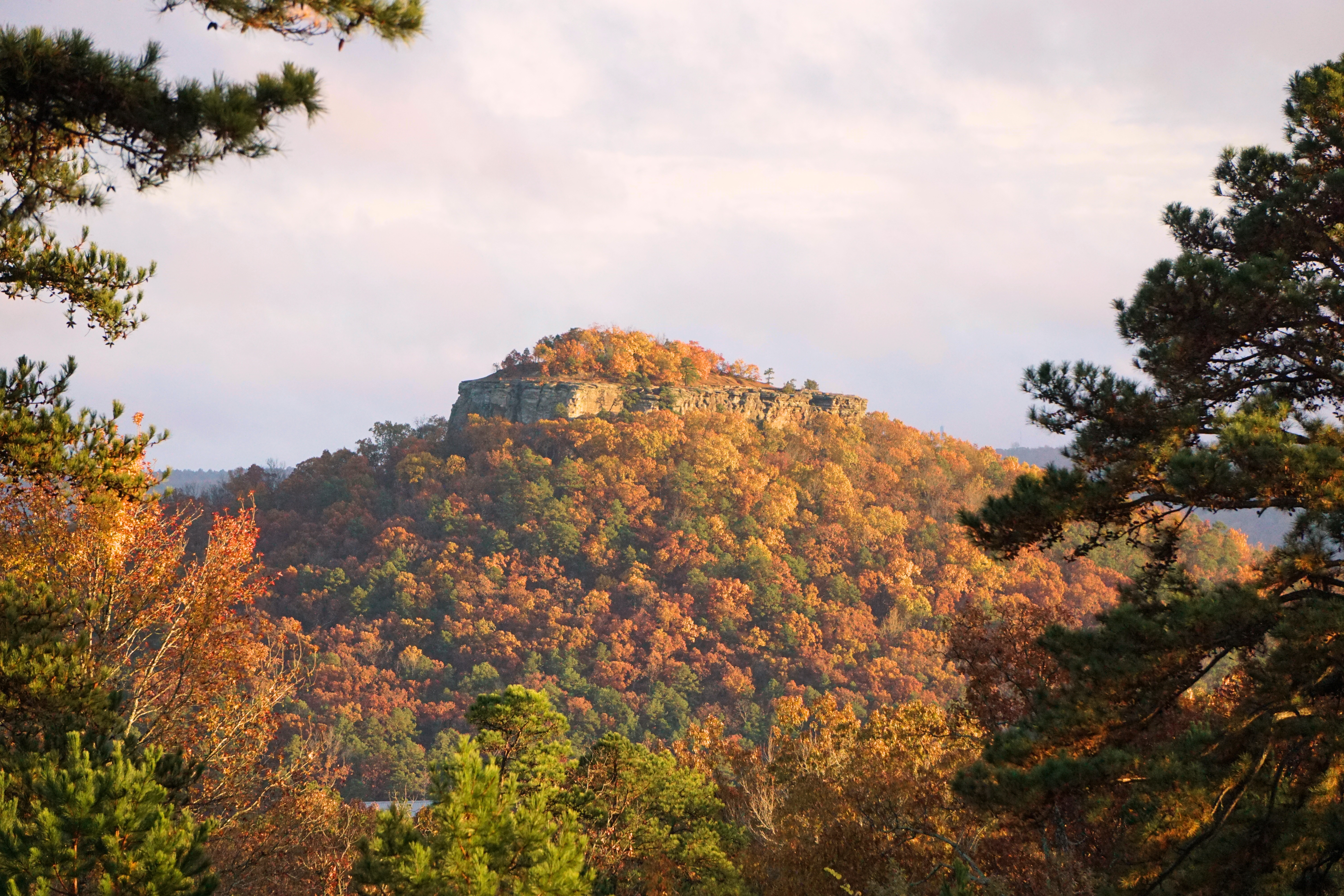
Sugarloaf Mountain in the Fall

== History ==
The Osage Tribe called the mountain Tonawanda or Ton-Wan-Dah (swift water). The name was that of a family of arrowhead makers.

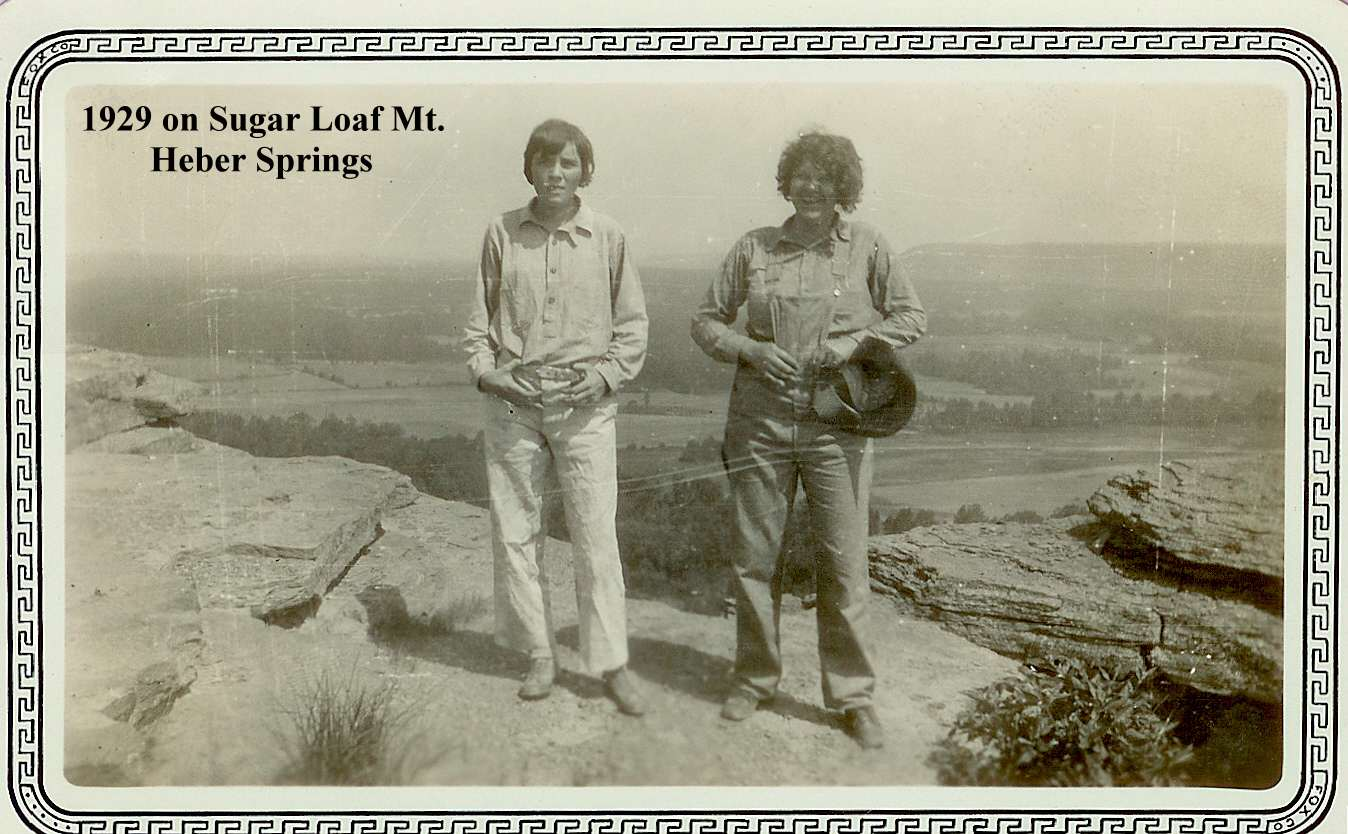
1929 picture of Sugarloaf Mountain

The earliest settlers called the mountain 'Sugarloaf' because of the resemblance in shape to the loaves of unrefined sugar in use at that time. The Louisiana Purchase survey party in 1819 noted the feature as "encountered Sugar Lofe [sic], a well-known landmark". Natives and travelers on the nearby Little Red River used the mountain as a landmark. The name of the landmark became the name of the springs to the west and the community, Sugarloaf, that developed there. The community's name was later changed to Heber Springs, Arkansas.

Sugarloaf Mountain is located on a section line, and consequently, land transactions have always been conducted in two parcels. For several years, beginning in 1901, the Lucas brothers, Creighton and Richard, maintained a mining claim on the north side of Sugarloaf Mountain, but no ore or oil was discovered. In 1922 L.E. Robbins of Heber Springs, Arkansas purchased 40 acres (160,000 m^{2}) on the south of the mountain along with other land from Richard R. Lucas. In 1951 he acquired a clear title to the 40 acres (160,000 m^{2}) on the north side by patent from the United States government. In the same year of the patent, Robbins and his wife Dotte dedicated 80 acres (320,000 m^{2}) to the town of Heber Springs in a 99-year lease. The lease specified that the land was to be used as a public park and picnic ground, and that the town should have the right to build barbecue grills, tables and benches; it also specified that no lumber should be cut except as prescribed by the Arkansas Forestry Commission, and then only by the grantors or their heirs.

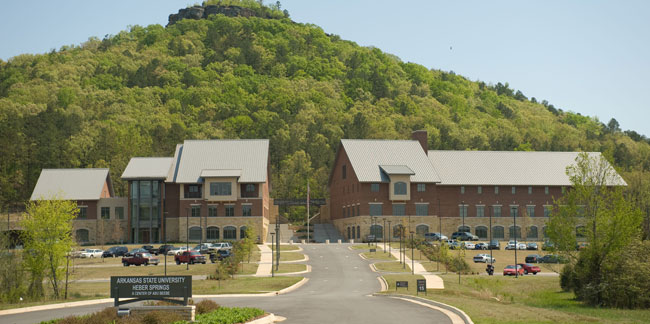
ASU-Beebe, Heber Springs by Sugarloaf Mountain

Beginning in March 2002, Arkansas State University, ASU-Beebe, purchased 249 acres on the east side of the city of Heber Springs which included Sugarloaf Mountain. Construction on the ASU-Heber Springs campus at the base of Sugarloaf Mountain was completed in 2007, which consists of the Academic Center and Student Services/Administration Building. The first phase of construction of the campus was completed in 2007.

At the same time, working with Arkansas State University (ASU), the Sugarloaf Heritage Council was established to remove graffiti, restore, enhance, and make additions to the existing trails. Environmentally safe solvents were used to remove the graffiti. Workers suspended by ropes from the side of the mountain used the solvents to clean the graffiti. The trail work took 10 years to complete.

== Points of interest ==
The trails on Sugarloaf Mountain:

- Tonawanda - 1.3 miles around the summit
- Summit - 0.66 miles up 690' to the top
- Hidden Pond - 1 mile paved, ADA compliant
- Wildlife - 1 mile (along Sulphur Creek, looping around Waterfowl Lake)
- Vanguard - 2.6 mile mountain biking and trail running.

== Gallery ==
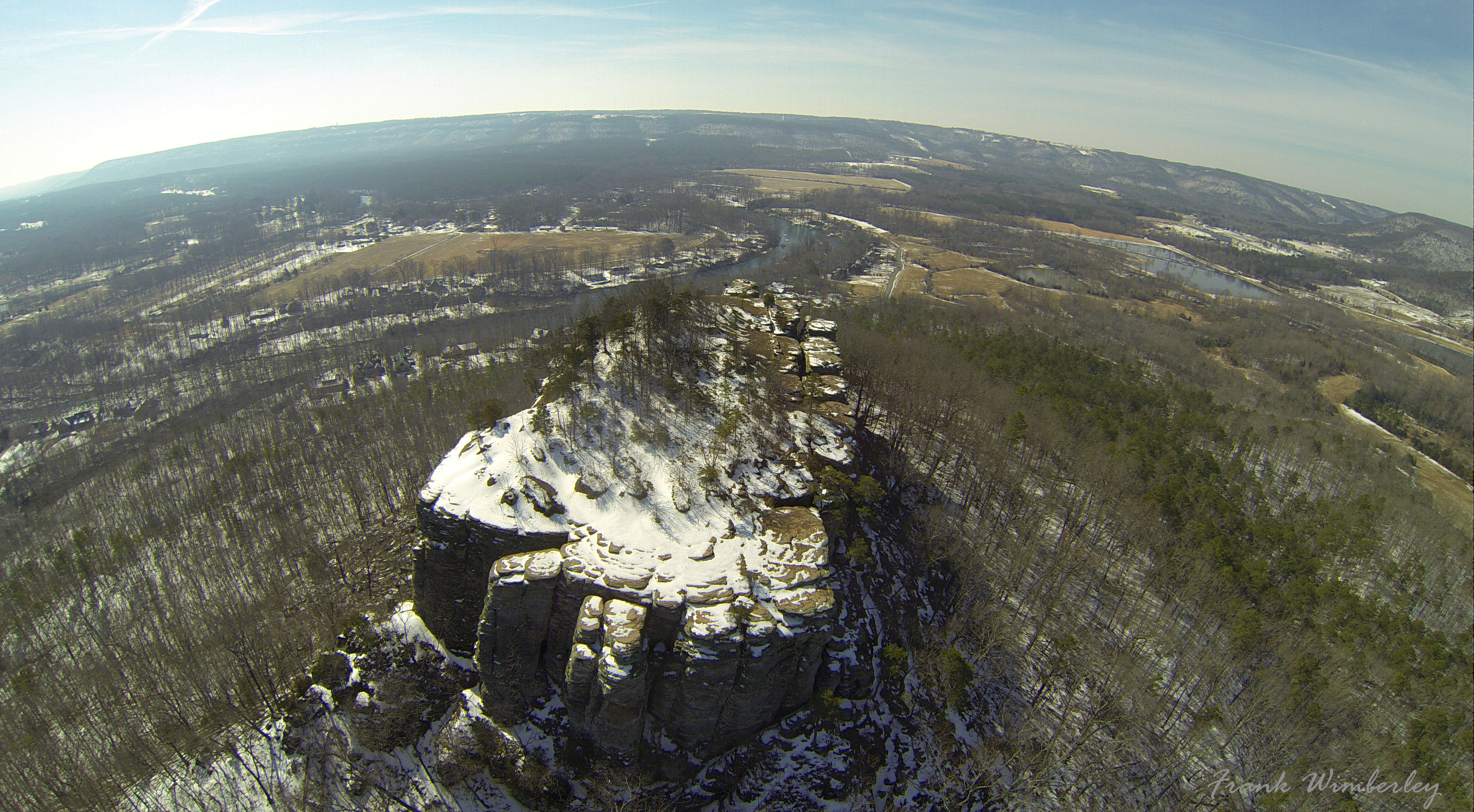
Sugarloaf Mountain in Winter

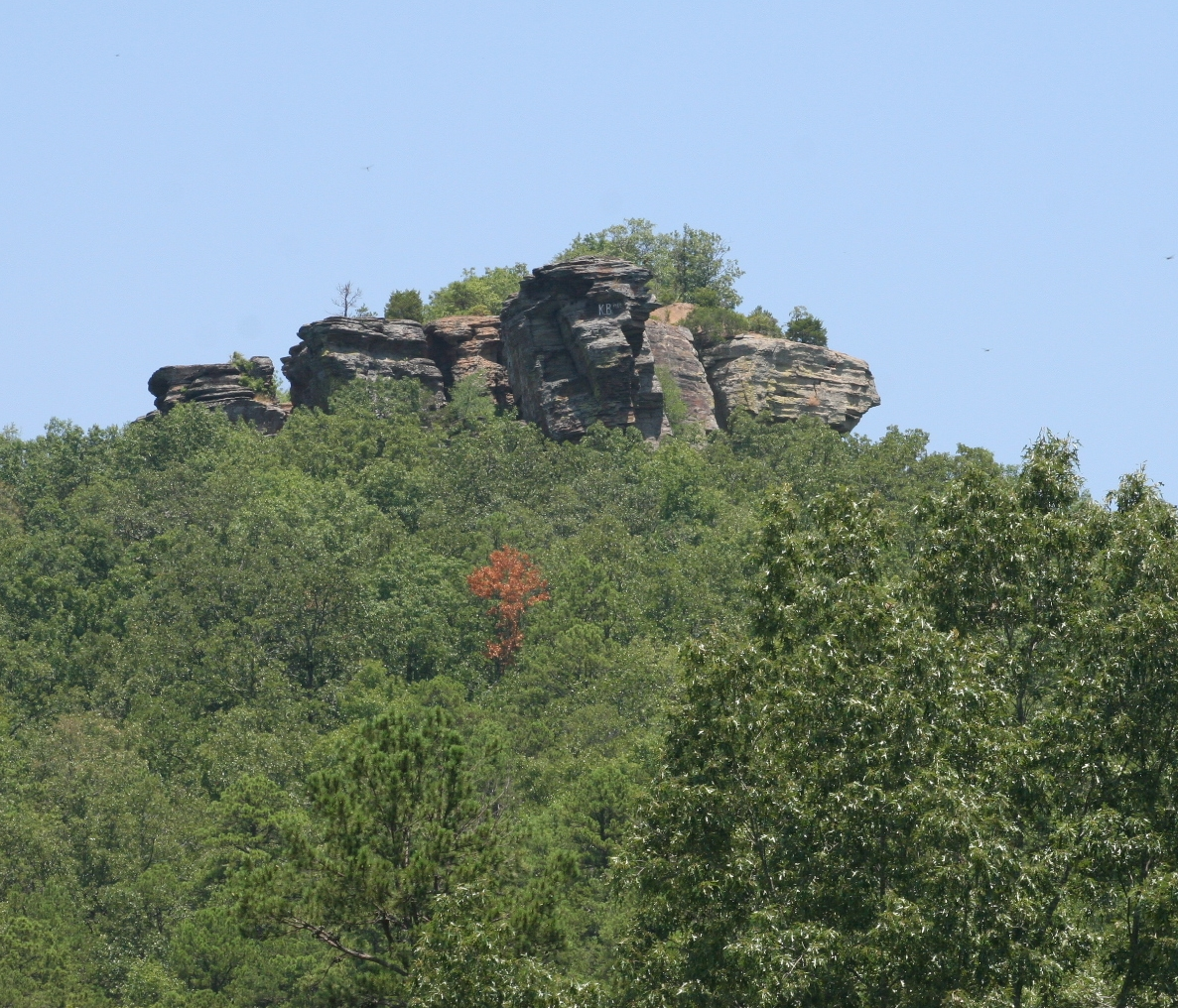
The Original Hard Rock: Sugarloaf Mountain

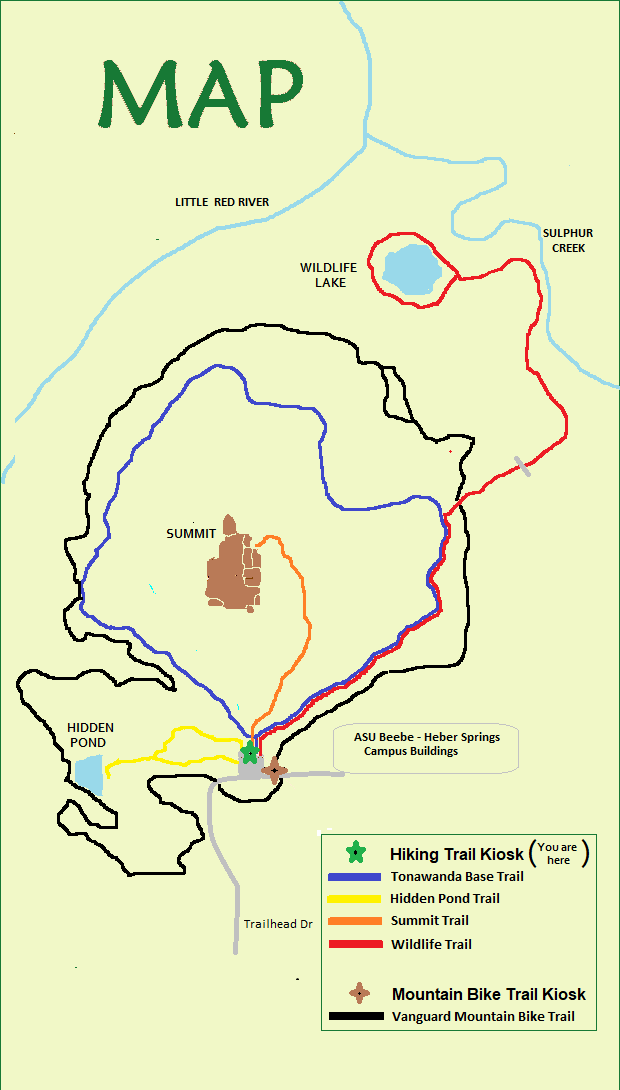
Map of Sugarloaf Trails
