= Cleburne County Courthouse (Arkansas) =

- U.S. National Register of Historic Places
- U.S. Historic district – Contributing property
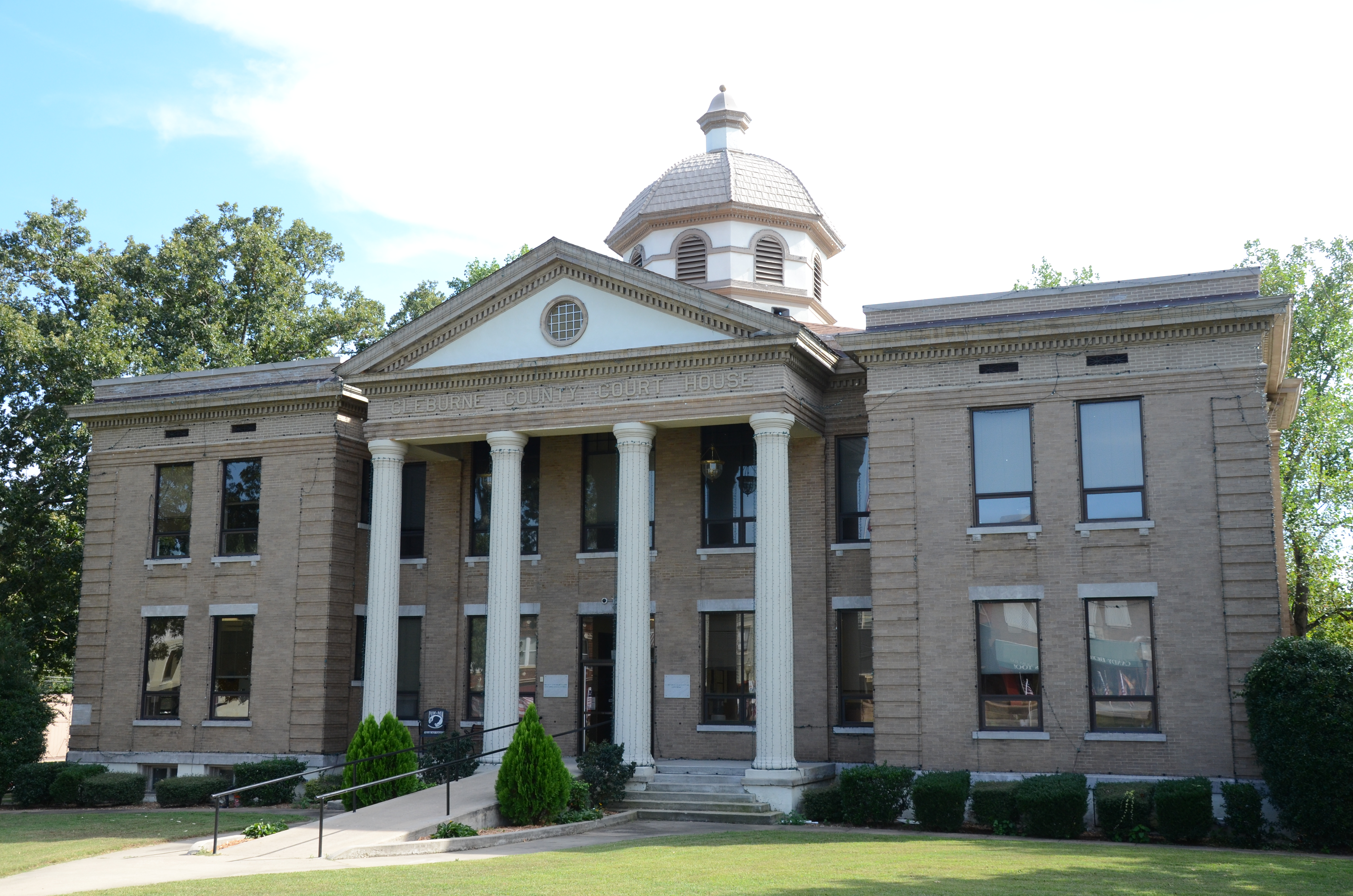

- Location within Arkansas Location within the United States
- Interactive map showing the location of Cleburne County Courthouse
- Location: Courthouse Sq., Heber Springs, Arkansas
- Coordinates: 35°29′27″N 92°1′55″W
- Area: less than one acre
- Built: 1914
- Architect: Clyde A. Ferrell
- Architectural style: Jeffersonian Revival
- Part of: Heber Springs Commercial Historic District (ID09000266)
- NRHP reference No.: 76000393

Significant dates
- Added to NRHP: July 12, 1976
- Designated CP: May 1, 2009

The Cleburne County Courthouse is located at Courthouse Square in the center of Heber Springs, the county seat of Cleburne County, Arkansas. It is a two-story brick building, built in the Jeffersonian Revival style in 1914 to a design by Clyde A. Ferrell. It has a symmetrical facade, with slightly projecting wings on either side of a central entrance. The entrance is fronted by a projecting four-column Classical portico with gabled pediment. The building is topped by a large octagonal cupola.

The building was listed in the National Register of Historic Places in 1976.

== See also ==
- National Register of Historic Places listings in Cleburne County, Arkansas
