= Heber Springs, Arkansas =

- City
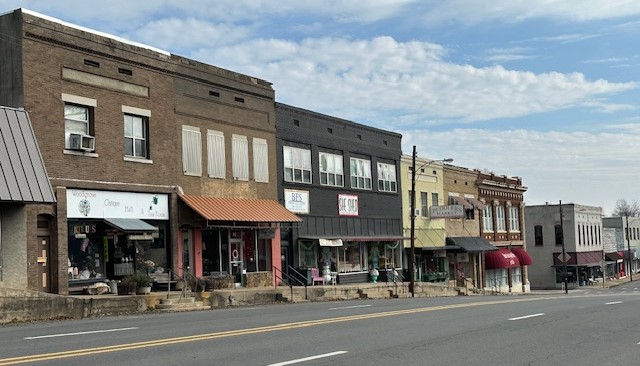
- Heber Springs Commercial Historic District, in February of 2025

- Location of Heber Springs in Cleburne County, Arkansas.
- Coordinates: 35°29′58″N 92°01′20″W
- Country: United States
- State: Arkansas
- County: Cleburne

Area
  - Total: 9.09 sq mi (23.55 km^{2})
  - Land: 9.09 sq mi (23.55 km^{2})
  - Water: 0 sq mi (0.00 km^{2})
- Elevation: 466 ft (142 m)

Population (2020)
  - Total: 6,969
  - Estimate (2025): 7,323 ▲
  - Density: 766.3/sq mi (295.87/km^{2})
- Time zone: UTC-6 (Central (CST))
  - Summer (DST): UTC-5 (CDT)
- ZIP codes: 72543, 72545
- Area code: 501
- FIPS code: 05-31090
- GNIS feature ID: 2404673
- Website: cityofhebersprings.com

Heber Springs is a city in and the county seat of Cleburne County, Arkansas, United States. The population was 6,969 as of the 2020 Census.

== Geography ==
Heber Springs is located near the center of Cleburne County. Arkansas Highway 5 bypasses the center of the city to the east, leading north 40 miles (64 km) to Mountain View and south 62 miles (100 km) to Little Rock (via U.S. Route 67). Searcy is 28 miles (45 km) to the southeast via Highway 16.

According to the United States Census Bureau, the city has a total area of 8.4 square miles (21.7 km^{2}), all land. The city was named for a series of natural springs that are located on the east side of town on Main Street. Greers Ferry Lake and the Little Red River are located just north of the city, where rainbow trout are stocked in the Little Red and can be fished below the Greers Ferry Dam. The lake is a major tourism draw for swimming, boating, and personal watercraft, complemented by the Little Red River and Sugarloaf Mountain along the eastern portion of the city.

=== Climate ===
The climate in this area is characterized by hot, humid summers and generally mild to cool winters. According to the Köppen Climate Classification system, Heber Springs has a humid subtropical climate, abbreviated "Cfa" on climate maps.

Climate data for Heber Springs, Arkansas (Greers Ferry Dam) (1991–2020 normals, extremes 1903–1908, 1962–present)
Month	Jan	Feb	Mar	Apr	May	Jun	Jul	Aug	Sep	Oct	Nov	Dec	Year
Record high °F (°C)	78 (26)	82 (28)	92 (33)	94 (34)	97 (36)	107 (42)	110 (43)	113 (45)	108 (42)	95 (35)	89 (32)	78 (26)	113 (45)
Mean maximum °F (°C)	68.5 (20.3)	72.3 (22.4)	79.6 (26.4)	84.5 (29.2)	88.7 (31.5)	93.8 (34.3)	98.2 (36.8)	98.8 (37.1)	94.3 (34.6)	87.2 (30.7)	77.1 (25.1)	69.0 (20.6)	100.3 (37.9)
Mean daily maximum °F (°C)	48.4 (9.1)	53.5 (11.9)	61.8 (16.6)	71.6 (22.0)	79.2 (26.2)	86.6 (30.3)	90.9 (32.7)	90.6 (32.6)	84.0 (28.9)	73.2 (22.9)	60.8 (16.0)	51.0 (10.6)	71.0 (21.7)
Daily mean °F (°C)	38.1 (3.4)	42.2 (5.7)	50.2 (10.1)	59.5 (15.3)	67.9 (19.9)	76.1 (24.5)	80.2 (26.8)	79.3 (26.3)	72.4 (22.4)	61.2 (16.2)	50.0 (10.0)	41.0 (5.0)	59.8 (15.4)
Mean daily minimum °F (°C)	27.7 (−2.4)	30.9 (−0.6)	38.5 (3.6)	47.4 (8.6)	56.7 (13.7)	65.5 (18.6)	69.5 (20.8)	68.0 (20.0)	60.8 (16.0)	49.2 (9.6)	39.1 (3.9)	31.1 (−0.5)	48.7 (9.3)
Mean minimum °F (°C)	12.6 (−10.8)	16.4 (−8.7)	23.0 (−5.0)	33.3 (0.7)	43.8 (6.6)	56.0 (13.3)	62.1 (16.7)	60.4 (15.8)	47.9 (8.8)	34.8 (1.6)	24.4 (−4.2)	18.4 (−7.6)	9.5 (−12.5)
Record low °F (°C)	−7 (−22)	−3 (−19)	9 (−13)	26 (−3)	33 (1)	46 (8)	50 (10)	49 (9)	35 (2)	24 (−4)	8 (−13)	−5 (−21)	−7 (−22)
Average precipitation inches (mm)	3.79 (96)	3.84 (98)	4.94 (125)	5.35 (136)	5.69 (145)	3.72 (94)	4.37 (111)	3.78 (96)	3.65 (93)	4.24 (108)	5.09 (129)	4.92 (125)	53.38 (1,356)
Average snowfall inches (cm)	0.6 (1.5)	0.6 (1.5)	0.7 (1.8)	0.0 (0.0)	0.0 (0.0)	0.0 (0.0)	0.0 (0.0)	0.0 (0.0)	0.0 (0.0)	0.0 (0.0)	0.0 (0.0)	0.7 (1.8)	2.6 (6.6)
Average precipitation days (≥ 0.01 in)	7.7	7.9	9.1	9.0	10.2	8.3	8.6	7.9	6.6	7.9	8.4	8.6	100.2
Average snowy days (≥ 0.1 in)	0.3	0.3	0.2	0.0	0.0	0.0	0.0	0.0	0.0	0.0	0.0	0.2	1.0
Source: NOAA

== Demographics ==
Historical population
Census	Pop.	Note	%±
1890	322		—
1900	552		71.4%
1910	1,126		104.0%
1920	1,675		48.8%
1930	1,401		−16.4%
1940	1,656		18.2%
1950	2,109		27.4%
1960	2,265		7.4%
1970	2,497		10.2%
1980	4,589		83.8%
1990	5,628		22.6%
2000	6,432		14.3%
2010	7,165		11.4%
2020	6,969		−2.7%
2025 (est.)	7,323	▲	5.1%
U.S. Decennial Census

=== 2020 census ===
As of the 2020 census, Heber Springs had a population of 6,969. The median age was 46.7 years. 20.4% of residents were under the age of 18 and 27.8% of residents were 65 years of age or older. For every 100 females, there were 87.7 males, and for every 100 females age 18 and over, there were 83.4 males age 18 and over.

92.5% of residents lived in urban areas, while 7.5% lived in rural areas.

There were 3,087 households in Heber Springs, including 1,890 families. Of all households, 25.4% had children under the age of 18 living in them. About 40.9% were married-couple households, 18.5% were households with a male householder and no spouse or partner present, and 33.8% were households with a female householder and no spouse or partner present. About 35.7% of all households were made up of individuals, and 20.2% had someone living alone who was 65 years of age or older.

There were 3,630 housing units, of which 15.0% were vacant. The homeowner vacancy rate was 3.2% and the rental vacancy rate was 14.4%.

Heber Springs racial composition
Race	Number	Percentage
White (non-Hispanic)	6,323	90.73%
Black or African American (non-Hispanic)	23	0.33%
Native American	37	0.53%
Asian	51	0.73%
Other/Mixed	314	4.51%
Hispanic or Latino	221	3.17%

=== 2010 census ===
As of the census of 2010, there were 7,165 people, 2,793 households, and 1,851 families residing in the city. The population density was 923.7 inhabitants per square mile (356.6/km^{2}). There were 3,159 housing units at an average density of 453.7 per square mile (175.2/km^{2}). The racial makeup of the city was 97.90% White, 0.23% Black or African American, 0.44% Native American, 0.39% Asian, 0.03% Pacific Islander, 0.22% from other races, and 0.79% from two or more races. 1.80% of the population were Hispanic or Latino of any race.

There were 2,793 households, out of which 26.9% had children under the age of 18 living with them, 50.7% were married couples living together, 12.5% had a female householder with no husband present, and 33.7% were non-families. 30.5% of all households were made up of individuals, and 16.7% had someone living alone who was 65 years of age or older. The average household size was 2.21, and the average family size was 2.72.

In the city, the population was spread out, with 21.5% under the age of 18, 6.7% from 18 to 24, 23.4% from 25 to 44, 23.1% from 45 to 64, and 25.3% who were 65 years of age or older. The median age was 44 years. For every 100 females, there were 83.9 males. For every 100 females age 18 and over, there were 80.3 males.

The median income for a household in the city was $29,599, and the median income for a family was $37,228. Males had a median income of $30,772 versus $19,720 for females. The per capita income for the city was $19,656. About 8.6% of families and 13.3% of the population were below the poverty line, including 17.6% of those under age 18 and 12.8% of those age 65 or over.

== History ==
Initially named Sugar Loaf, Heber Springs was founded by Max Frauenthal. In 1881, Frauenthal bought land in Van Buren County from John T. Jones. He founded the Sugar Loaf Springs Company and plotted a town site which was incorporated as "Sugar Loaf" on October 4, 1882. In 1883, Frauenthal donated land for the courthouse square, built a frame courthouse to be used by the soon-to-be-created Cleburne County, and donated the land for Spring Park, thus securing the county seat for the new town. Frauenthal chose the name Cleburne County to honor Confederate General Patrick Cleburne, who was killed in the Battle of Franklin in 1864. In 1910, Sugar Loaf's name was changed to Heber Springs in order to avoid confusion with another town with a post office named Sugar Loaf. Frauenthal chose the new name to honor John T. Jones's son, Dr. Heber Jones, who was a prominent physician in Memphis, Tennessee, where Frauenthal had since moved.

=== Greers Ferry Dam ===
Located on the Little Red River, the dam was dedicated in October 1963 by President John F. Kennedy just one month before his assassination. This event marks the only time a sitting president has visited Cleburne County.

=== Swinging Bridge collapse ===
The 200-to-300-foot (61 to 91 m) long Swinging Bridge over the Little Red River was erected in 1912, closed to vehicles in 1972 but kept open for pedestrians in a recreational area, and placed on the National Register of Historic Places in 1985. On 28 October 1989 30 to 50 young pedestrians rocked the span back and forth until the upstream steel cable of the suspension bridge broke. The span flipped, the other cable broke, and the bridge collapsed and fell 30 feet (9.1 m) into the river. At least five people died and 18 were hurt.

== Education ==
Public education for elementary and secondary students is provided by:

- Heber Springs School District, the school district covering the city limits, with students graduating from Heber Springs High School.

== Notable people ==
- Brandon Bell (recording engineer), Grammy Award winning record engineer, mix engineer and producer
- Everett G. Burkhalter, represented the 27th District of California in the U.S. House of Representatives
- Paul Caraway, High Commissioner of the U.S. Civil Administration of the Ryukyu Islands
- Mike Disfarmer, photographer
- Max Frauenthal, Civil War hero and founding father of Heber Springs
- Laurell K. Hamilton, author of the "Anita Blake: Vampire Hunter" series and "Meredith Gentry" series
- Johnnie Bryan Hunt, founder of J.B. Hunt Transport Services
- Johnelle Hunt, co-founder of J.B. Hunt Transport Services
- Tommy Land, Arkansas Commissioner of State Lands
- Mindy McCready, country music singer (Committed suicide in Heber Springs)
- David Miller, itinerant preacher
- Josh Miller, Republican member of the Arkansas House of Representatives from Districts 66 and 41, including Heber Springs
- Colin O'More, concert singer, educator, and broadcasting executive
- Almeda Riddle, folk singer
- Fred Williams, NFL football player
- Stan Lee, 2007 USGA Senior Amateur Champion
- Louis Lee, 2011 USGA Senior Amateur Champion

== Points of interest ==
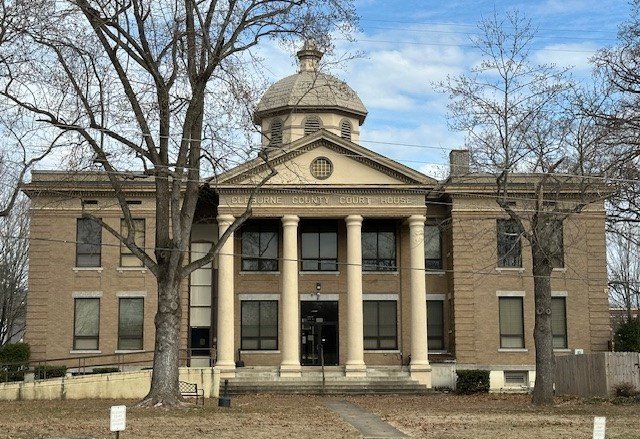
Cleburne County Courthouse in Heber Springs AR, 2-2025

The Cleburne County Courthouse, the Cleburne County Farm Cemetery, the Dr. Cyrus F. Crosby House, the Mike Meyer Disfarmer Gravesite, the Clarence Frauenthal House, the Heber Springs Commercial Historic District, the Hugh L. King House, the T.E. Olmstead & Son Funeral Home, the Rector House, and the Woman's Community Club Band Shell, are all Heber Springs locations on the National Register of Historic Places.
