= Quitman School District (disambiguation) =

Quitman School District is a public school district in Quitman, Mississippi.

Quitman School District may also refer to:

- Quitman School District (Arkansas), Quitman, Arkansas
- Quitman County School District (Georgia)
- Quitman County School District (Mississippi), Marks, Mississippi
- Quitman Independent School District, Quitman, Texas

== See also ==
- Quitman High School (disambiguation)
- Quitman (disambiguation)
