= Quitman =

Quitman may refer to:

== Places in the United States ==
- Quitman, Arkansas
- Quitman, Georgia
- Quitman, Louisiana
- Quitman, Mississippi
- Quitman, Missouri
- Quitman, Texas
- Quitman County, Georgia
- Quitman County, Mississippi

== Other uses ==
- Fort Quitman, a former fort on the Rio Grande in Texas
- John A. Quitman, Governor of Mississippi

== See also ==
- Quitman High School (disambiguation)
- Quitman School District (disambiguation)
