= Home Economics Building =

Home Economics Building may refer to:

in the United States

(by state then city)

- George Washington Carver High School Home Economics Building, Augusta, Arkansas, listed on the NRHP in Woodruff County, Arkansas
- Calico Rock Home Economics Building, Calico Rock, Arkansas, listed on the NRHP in Izard County, Arkansas
- Home Economics Building-University of Arkansas, Fayetteville, Fayetteville, Arkansas, listed on the NRHP in Washington County, Arkansas
- Guy Home Economics Building, Guy, Arkansas, listed on the NRHP in Faulkner County, Arkansas
- Mulberry Home Economics Building, Mulberry, Arkansas, listed on the NRHP in Crawford County, Arkansas
- Quitman Home Economics Building, Quitman, Arkansas, listed on the NRHP in Cleburne County, Arkansas
- Home Economics Building (Torrance High School), Torrance, California, listed on the NRHP in Los Angeles County, California
- Home Economics Building (Bowling Green, Kentucky), listed on the NRHP in Warren County, Kentucky
- Home Economics Building (Vanderbilt University), Nashville, Tennessee
- Pittman Community Center Home Economics Building, Pittman Center, Tennessee, listed on the NRHP in Sevier County, Tennessee
