= Home Economics (disambiguation) =

Home economics, or family and consumer sciences, is a subject taught in many secondary schools.

Home Economics may also refer to:

- Home Economics (TV series), a 2021 American sitcom
- "Home Economics" (Community), a 2009 television episode

== See also ==
- "Home-Ec" (Roseanne), a 1991 television episode
- Home Economics Building (disambiguation)
- Consumer economics, a branch of microeconomics concerned with individual and family consumer behavior
- University of Home Economics, a women's public university in Lahore, Pakistan
