= National Register of Historic Places listings in Quitman County, Georgia =

This is a list of properties and districts in Quitman County, Georgia that are listed on the National Register of Historic Places (NRHP).

This National Park Service list is complete through NPS recent listings posted March 21, 2025.

== Current listings ==
| | Name on the Register | Image | Date listed | Location | City or town | Description |
|---|---|---|---|---|---|---|
| 1 | Quitman County Courthouse | Quitman County Courthouse | June 8, 1995 (#95000718) | 111 Main St. 31°53′09″N 85°06′33″W | Georgetown | This one-story brick courthouse was built in 1939 by the Public Works Administration using federal relief funds. |
| 2 | Quitman County Jail | Quitman County Jail | August 13, 1981 (#81000200) | 115 Main St. 31°53′08″N 85°06′35″W | Georgetown | The original jail was a wooden structure built in 1859. It was replaced in 1891 with the current brick structure. |
