= O.D. Gunn Trade and Sale Barn =

- U.S. National Register of Historic Places
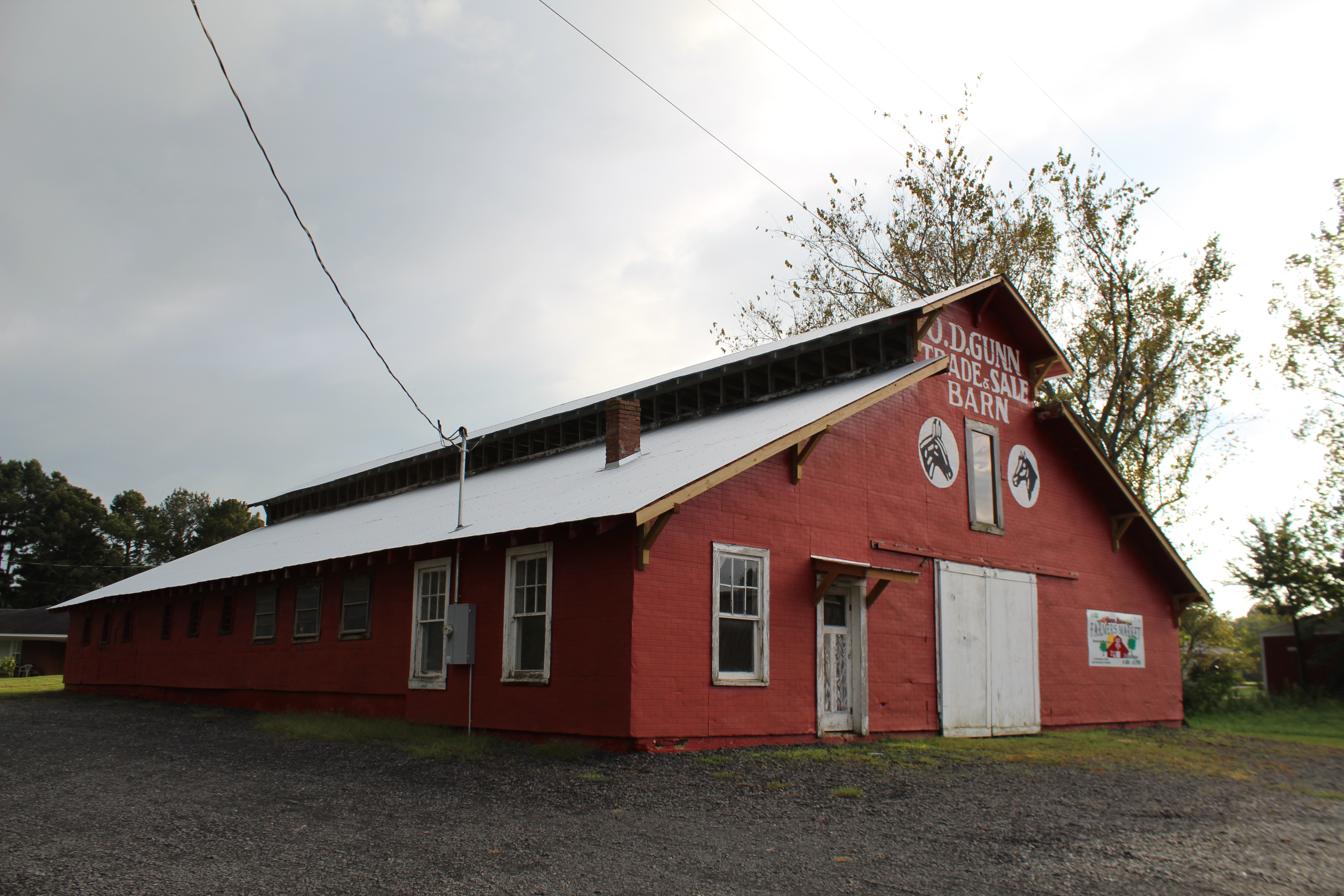

- Location within Arkansas Location within the United States
- Location: 10 Anna St., Quitman, Arkansas
- Coordinates: 35°22′59″N 92°12′58″W
- Area: less than one acre
- NRHP reference No.: 16000316
- Added to NRHP: June 7, 2016

The O.D. Gunn Trade and Sale Barn is a historic commercial agricultural building at 10 Anna Street in Quitman, Arkansas. It is a rectangular wood-frame structure with a monitor gabled roof. Its exterior is clad in metal sheathing scored to resemble brick. The roof has exposed rafter ends, and heavy Craftsman style brackets at the front-facing gable end. It was built about 1910 by Offie Dorris Gunn, who used it to deal in horses and mules. It is a particularly well-preserved barn of the type used for this purpose in the early 20th century.

The building was listed on the National Register of Historic Places in 2016.

== See also ==
- National Register of Historic Places listings in Cleburne County, Arkansas
