= Quitman High School =

Quitman High School may refer to:

- Quitman High School (Arkansas), in Quitman, Arkansas
- Quitman County High School, Georgia
- Quitman High School (Louisiana), in Quitman, Louisiana
- Quitman High School, in Quitman School District, Mississippi
- Quitman High School (Texas) in Quitman, Texas

== See also ==
- Quitman School District
