= Quitman County School District =

Quitman County School District (QCSD) may refer to:

- Quitman County School District (Georgia)
- Quitman County School District (Mississippi)
