= Dill School =

- U.S. National Register of Historic Places
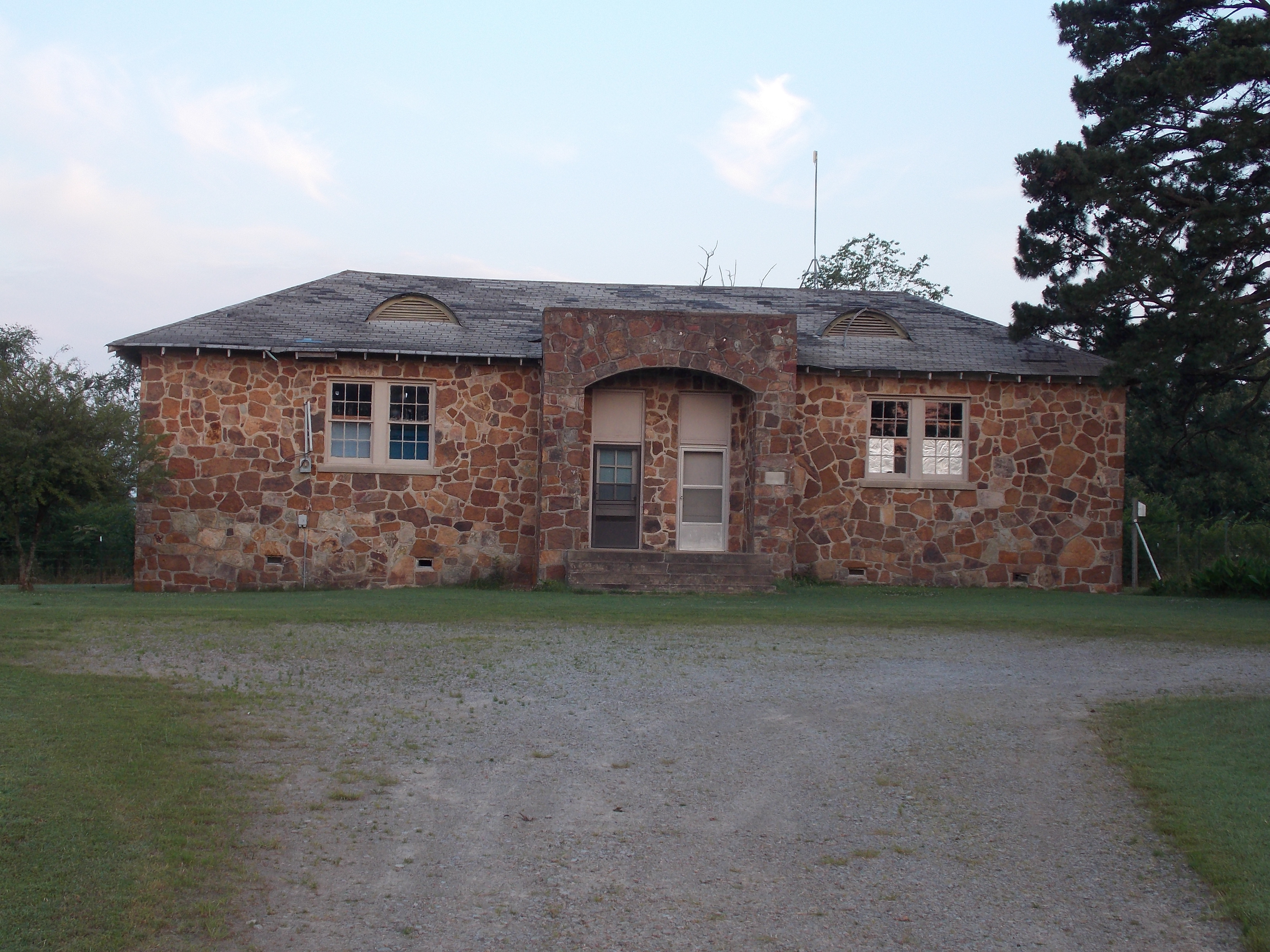

- Location within Arkansas Location within the United States
- Nearest city: Ida, Arkansas
- Coordinates: 35°35′08″N 91°55′47″W
- Area: less than one acre
- Built: 1938
- Built by: National Youth Administration
- MPS: Public Schools in the Ozarks MPS
- NRHP reference No.: 94000854
- Added to NRHP: August 16, 1994

The Dill School is a historic school building in rural Cleburne County, Arkansas. It is located a short way north of the village of Ida, on the west side of Arkansas Highway 5/25. It is a single story stone structure, with a broad hipped roof and four "eyebrow dormers". It has a pair of entrances sheltered by an arched projection that extends above the roof line. The northern support column of the portico is marked by a stone indicating the year of construction (1938), and that it was built with funding from the National Youth Administration. The building was used as a school until 1948, when its student population was consolidated into adjacent school districts. It has since seen a variety of other uses.

The building was listed on the National Register of Historic Places in 1994.

== See also ==
- National Register of Historic Places listings in Cleburne County, Arkansas
