= National Register of Historic Places listings in Cleburne County, Arkansas =

Location of Cleburne County in Arkansas

This is a list of the National Register of Historic Places listings in Cleburne County, Arkansas.

This is intended to be a complete list of the properties and districts on the National Register of Historic Places in Cleburne County, Arkansas, United States. The locations of National Register properties and districts for which the latitude and longitude coordinates are included below, may be seen in a map.

There are 18 properties and districts listed on the National Register in the county.

Contents: Counties in Arkansas
- Arkansas
- Ashley
- Baxter
- Benton
- Boone
- Bradley
- Calhoun
- Carroll
- Chicot
- Clark
- Clay
- Cleburne
- Cleveland
- Columbia
- Conway
- Craighead
- Crawford
- Crittenden
- Cross
- Dallas
- Desha
- Drew
- Faulkner
- Franklin
- Fulton
- Garland
- Grant
- Greene
- Hempstead
- Hot Spring
- Howard
- Independence
- Izard
- Jackson
- Jefferson
- Johnson
- Lafayette
- Lawrence
- Lee
- Lincoln
- Little River
- Logan
- Lonoke
- Madison
- Marion
- Miller
- Mississippi
- Monroe
- Montgomery
- Nevada
- Newton
- Ouachita
- Perry
- Phillips
- Pike
- Poinsett
- Polk
- Pope
- Prairie
- Pulaski (Little Rock)
- Randolph
- St. Francis
- Saline
- Scott
- Searcy
- Sebastian
- Sevier
- Sharp
- Stone
- Union
- Van Buren
- Washington
- White
- Woodruff
- Yell

This National Park Service list is complete through NPS recent listings posted May 1, 2026.

== Current listings ==
	Name on the Register	Image	Date listed	Location	City or town	Description
1	Brewer School	Brewer School	May 26, 2004 (#04000506)	Brewer Rd. 35°40′09″N 92°10′57″W	Brewer	
2	Cleburne County Courthouse	Cleburne County Courthouse	July 12, 1976 (#76000393)	Courthouse Sq. 35°29′27″N 92°01′55″W	Heber Springs	
3	Cleburne County Farm Cemetery	Cleburne County Farm Cemetery	September 28, 2005 (#05001066)	Southeastern corner of the junction of Plantation Dr., E., and Deer Run; 35°27′20″N 92°02′15″W	Heber Springs	
4	Dr. Cyrus F. Crosby House	Dr. Cyrus F. Crosby House	November 19, 1993 (#93001258)	202 N. Broadway St. 35°29′33″N 92°01′40″W	Heber Springs	
5	Dill School	Dill School	August 16, 1994 (#94000854)	Western side of Highways 5 and 25, north of Ida; 35°35′39″N 91°55′59″W	Ida	
6	Mike Meyer Disfarmer Gravesite	Mike Meyer Disfarmer Gravesite	January 21, 2009 (#08001335)	In the Heber Springs Cemetery at the northeastern corner of Oak St. and S. 4th St. 35°29′00″N 92°02′01″W	Heber Springs	
7	Clarence Frauenthal House	Clarence Frauenthal House	November 19, 1993 (#93001256)	210 N. Broadway St. 35°29′36″N 92°01′40″W	Heber Springs	
8	O.D. Gunn Trade and Sale Barn	O.D. Gunn Trade and Sale Barn	June 7, 2016 (#16000316)	10 Anna St. 35°22′59″N 92°12′58″W	Quitman	
9	Heber Springs Commercial Historic District	Heber Springs Commercial Historic District	May 1, 2009 (#09000266)	100 and 200 blocks of E. Main St., 100-500 blocks of W. Main St., 100 block of N. and S. 3rd, and N. and S. 4th Sts. 35°29′29″N 92°01′46″W	Heber Springs	
10	Hugh L. King House	Hugh L. King House	September 8, 1992 (#92001224)	110 W. Spring St. 35°29′34″N 92°01′47″W	Heber Springs	
11	Martin Dipping Vat		May 9, 2022 (#100007717)	Southeast of the intersection of Tiger B and Gills Rds. 35°38′21″N 91°51′49″W	Concord vicinity	
12	Old Highway 16 Bridge	Old Highway 16 Bridge	May 11, 2011 (#11000262)	Lakefront Resort Rd. 35°36′09″N 92°11′18″W	Edgemont vicinity	
13	T.E. Olmstead & Son Funeral Home	T.E. Olmstead & Son Funeral Home	December 13, 1995 (#95001438)	108 S. 4th St. 35°29′29″N 92°01′58″W	Heber Springs	
14	Quitman Home Economics Building	Quitman Home Economics Building	September 4, 1992 (#92001127)	2nd Ave. 35°22′47″N 92°13′17″W	Quitman	
15	Rector House	Rector House	October 17, 2008 (#08000486)	603 W. Quitman St. 35°29′23″N 92°02′07″W	Heber Springs	
16	Shaheen-Goodfellow Weekend Cottage	Shaheen-Goodfellow Weekend Cottage	October 30, 2002 (#97000854)	704 Stony Ridge; 35°30′00″N 92°06′30″W	Eden Isle	Designed by architect E. Fay Jones, also known as Stoneflower.
17	Woman's Community Club Band Shell	Woman's Community Club Band Shell	August 16, 1994 (#94000849)	Northeastern corner of Spring Park; 35°29′34″N 92°01′33″W	Heber Springs	
18	Woodrow Store	Woodrow Store	January 4, 2001 (#00001592)	Highway 263; 35°39′47″N 92°04′48″W	Woodrow	

== Former listings ==
	Name on the Register	Image	Date listed	Date removed	Location	City or town	Description
1	Quitman High School Building		September 4, 1992 (#92001126)	May 15, 2003	AR 25	Quitman	Delisted after extensive remodeling
2	Winkley Bridge		October 9, 1984 (#84000020)	August 11, 1999	E of Heber Springs at Little Red River	Heber Springs	Collapsed in 1989

== See also ==
- List of National Historic Landmarks in Arkansas
- National Register of Historic Places listings in Arkansas
