= Lynching of Josh Shorter =

African American who was lynched in the U.S.

- Location: 31°53′21″N 85°9′13″W; Eufaula, Alabama
- Date: June 8, 1881; 145 years ago

Josh Shorter was an African-American man who was lynched in Eufaula, Alabama, or between Eufaula and Georgetown, Georgia, on the afternoon of Wednesday June 8, 1881.

The lynching is described in an article in The Weekly News and Advertiser, a newspaper published in Georgia, on Saturday June 18, 1881: "A special telegram from Eufaula under date of the 9th, states that a most villainous outrage was committed upon a respectable white girl, twelve years old, by Josh Shorter, a negro, near that city, on Wednesday afternoon. A diligent pursuit by a large party resulted in his capture across the river in Georgia. He was immediately carried to the Alabama side, and upon the Sheriff’s attempting to get possession of him, they hurried him back to Georgia with a large crowd and hung him to a limb of a largo tree, about midway between Eufaula and Georgetown."

The Legacy of Lynching website marks his murder as occurring in Eufaula: "name: Josh Shorter, Jun 1881; description: from riverbank about 200 yards above city bridge".
