= List of places in Arkansas: Q =

Arkansas State Seal

This list of current cities, towns, unincorporated communities, and other recognized places in the U.S. state of Arkansas whose name begins with the letter Q. It also includes information on the number and names of counties in which the place lies, and its lower and upper zip code bounds, if applicable.

== Cities and Towns ==
Name of place	Number of counties	Principal county	Lower zip code	Upper zip code
Quarles	1	Crittenden County		
Quarry Heights	1	Yell County		
Quinn City	1	Union County	71730	
Quitman	2	Cleburne County; Faulkner County	72131	
