= Guy High School Gymnasium =

- U.S. National Register of Historic Places
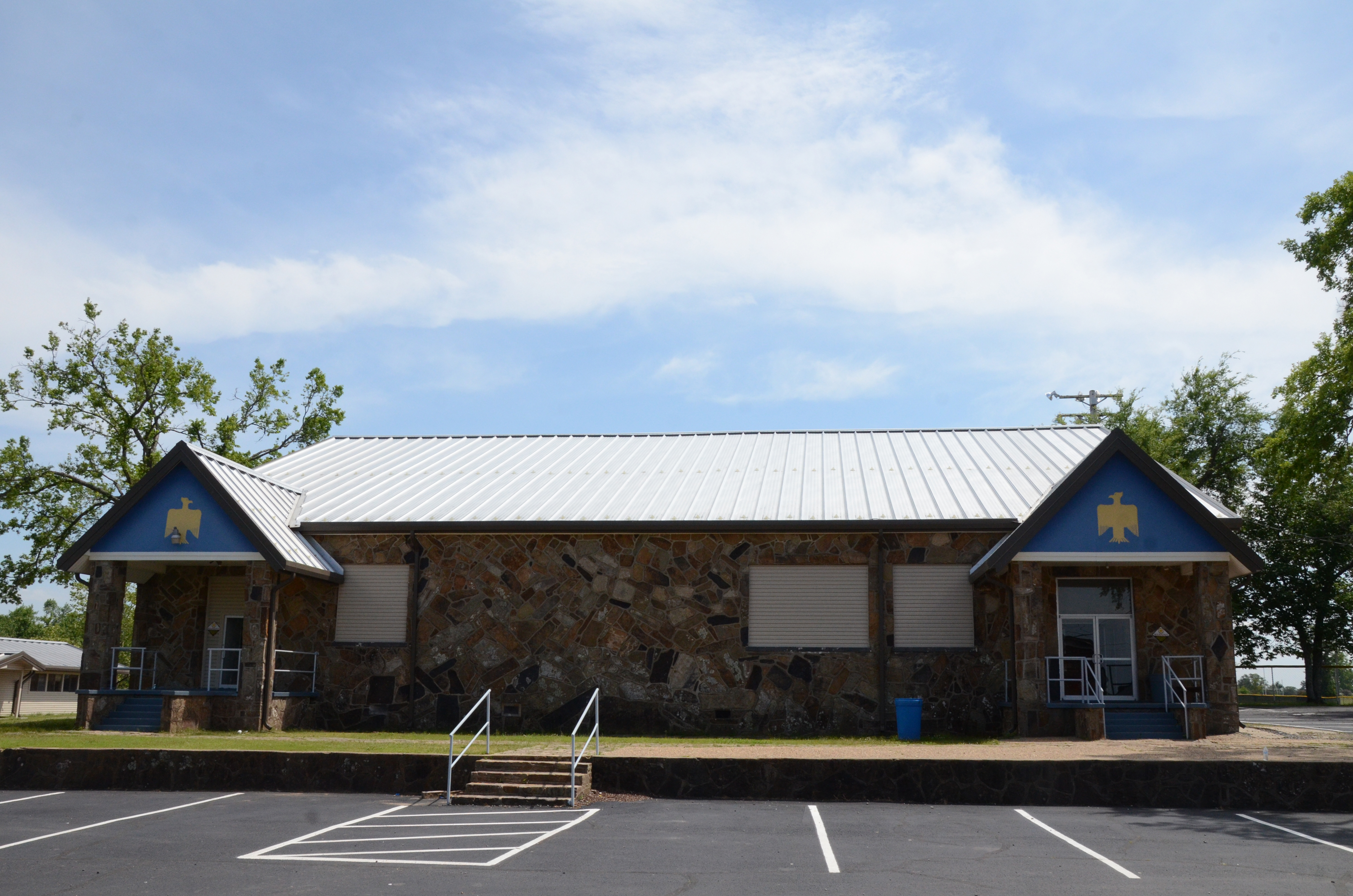

- Location within Arkansas Location within the United States
- Location: AR 25, Guy, Arkansas
- Coordinates: 35°19′24″N 92°19′24″W
- Area: less than one acre
- Built by: Works Progress Administration
- Architectural style: Bungalow/American craftsman, Plain Traditional
- MPS: Public Schools in the Ozarks MPS
- NRHP reference No.: 92001196
- Added to NRHP: September 10, 1992

The Guy High School Gymnasium is a historic school building on the campus of the Guy-Perkins District School System on Arkansas Highway 25, just east of Guy, Arkansas. It is a single story stone structure, with a gabled rood and four brick chimneys. Two gabled porches project from the front side, near the corners, each supported by stone columns and featuring stuccoed pediments. It was built by local labor with funding support from the Works Progress Administration in 1938.

The building was listed on the National Register of Historic Places in 1992.

== See also ==
- Guy Home Economics Building
- National Register of Historic Places listings in Faulkner County, Arkansas
