= Quitman County Courthouse and Old Jail =

- U.S. National Register of Historic Places
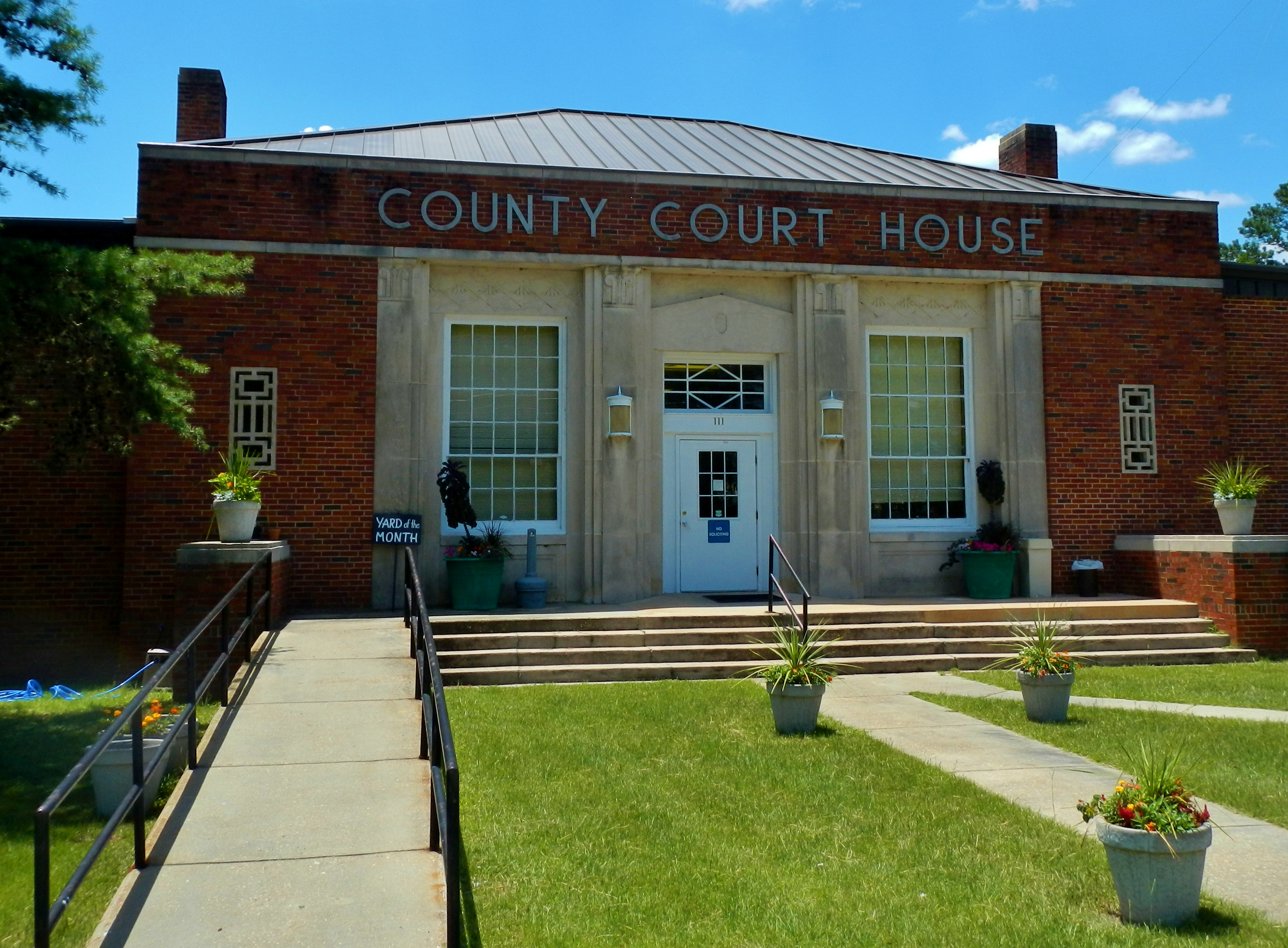

- Location within Georgia Location within the United States
- Location: 111 and 115 Main St., Georgetown
- Coordinates: 31°53′9″N 85°6′33″W
- Area: 2 acres (0.81 ha)
- Built: 1893
- Built by: Still, D.M.
- Architect: T. Firth Lockwood, Jr.
- Architectural style: Stripped Classical
- MPS: Georgia County Courthouses TR
- NRHP reference No.: 95000718
- Added to NRHP: June 8, 1995

The Quitman County Courthouse and Old Jail is a historic building in Georgetown, Georgia. It was listed on the National Register of Historic Places in 1995.

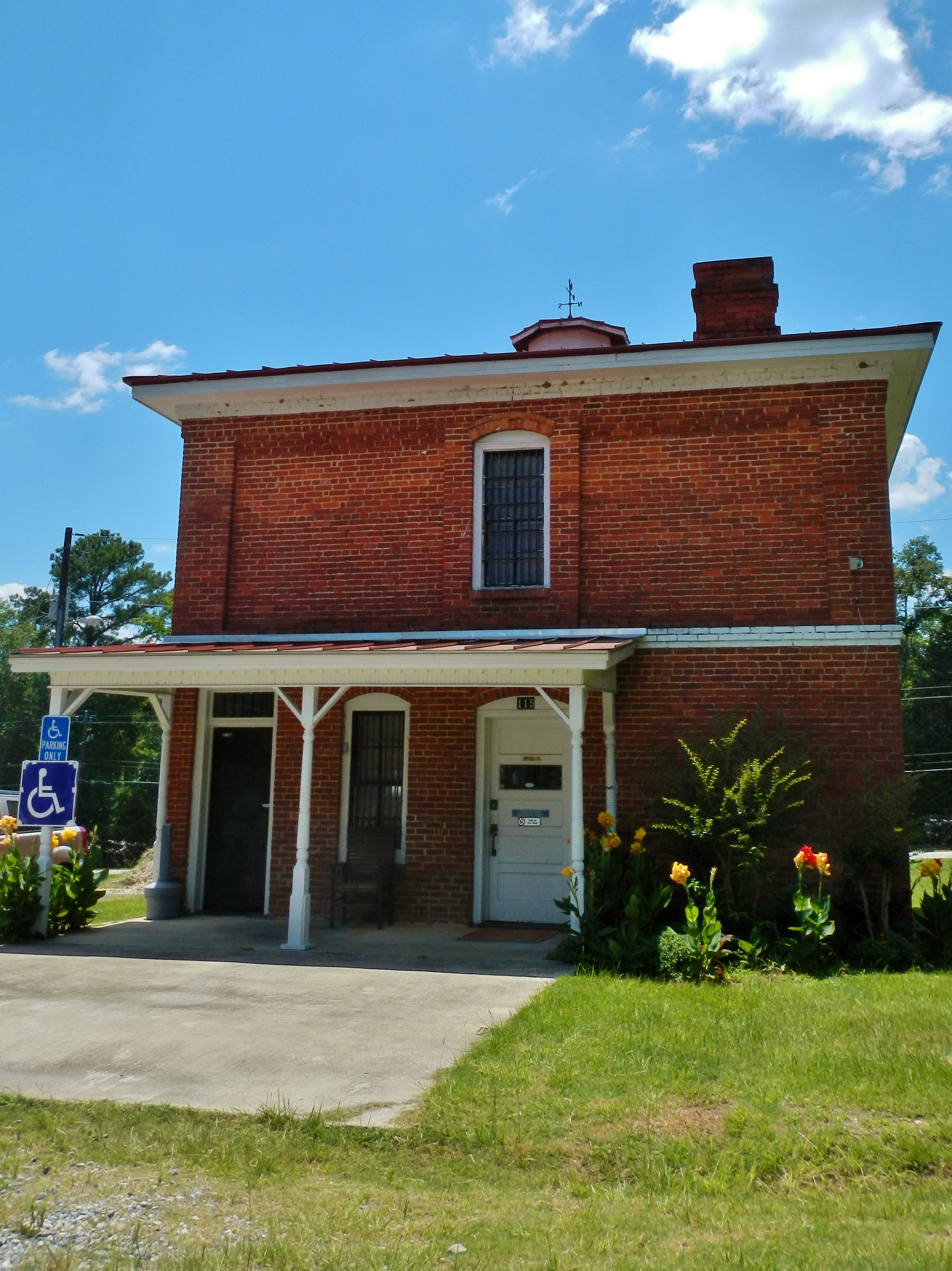
Old Jail, at 115 Main Strett

The listing includes the Old Quitman County Jail that was built in 1891 and was separately listed on the National Register in 1981. The old jail is a two-story brick structure that served until c.1965. It was renovated in 1994. It replaced the original wooden jail, built in 1859, that first served Quitman County, founded in 1858. The original jail was a wooden structure built in 1859. It was replaced in 1891 with the current brick structure.

The courthouse is a one-story brick courthouse built in 1939 by the Public Works Administration using federal relief funds. It was designed by T. Firth Lockwood, Jr. in Stripped Classical style.
