= Old Highway 16 Bridge =

- U.S. National Register of Historic Places
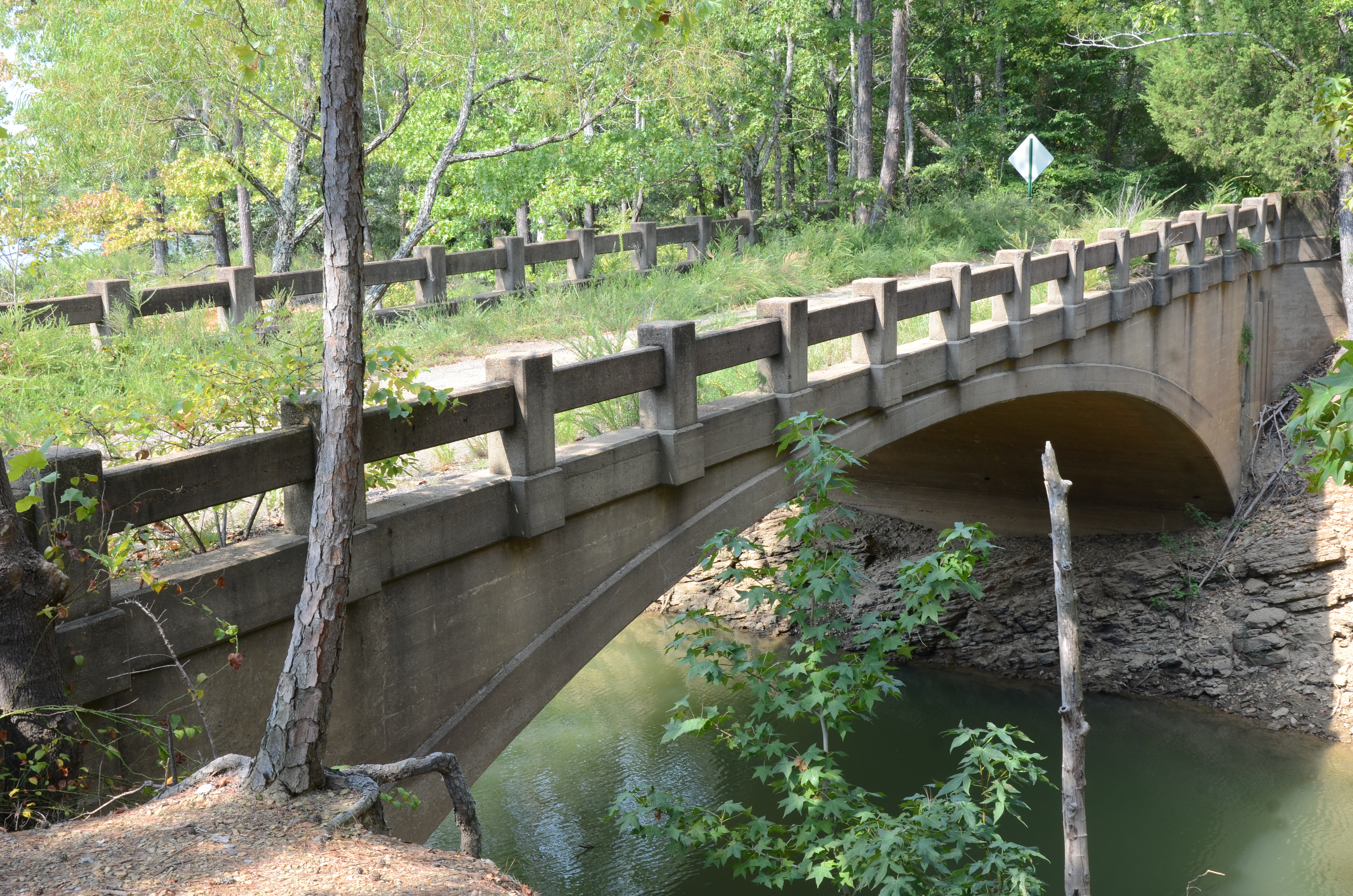

- Location within Arkansas Location within the United States
- Location: Lakefront Resort Rd., near Edgemont, Arkansas
- Coordinates: 35°36′9″N 92°11′18″W
- Area: less than one acre
- Architectural style: Closed spandrel, deck arch
- NRHP reference No.: 11000262
- Added to NRHP: May 11, 2011

The Old Highway 16 Bridge is a historic closed-spandrel arch bridge near Edgemont, Arkansas. It carries an unused old alignment of Arkansas Highway 16 across the manmade "Edgemont Cut", an excavation made in 1908 during construction of the now-abandoned Missouri and North Arkansas Railroad. The bridge was built in 1936 with funding from the Works Progress Administration, and remained in regular service until 1963, when Highway 16 was realigned. In that year, the United States Army Corps of Engineers moved the road north to its present alignment, filling in part of the old railway cut. The bridge is subject to flooding during exceptionally high water events in Greers Ferry Lake.

The bridge was listed on the National Register of Historic Places in 2011.

== See also ==
- National Register of Historic Places listings in Cleburne County, Arkansas
- List of bridges on the National Register of Historic Places in Arkansas
