= Morris, Georgia =

Morris
- Unincorporated community
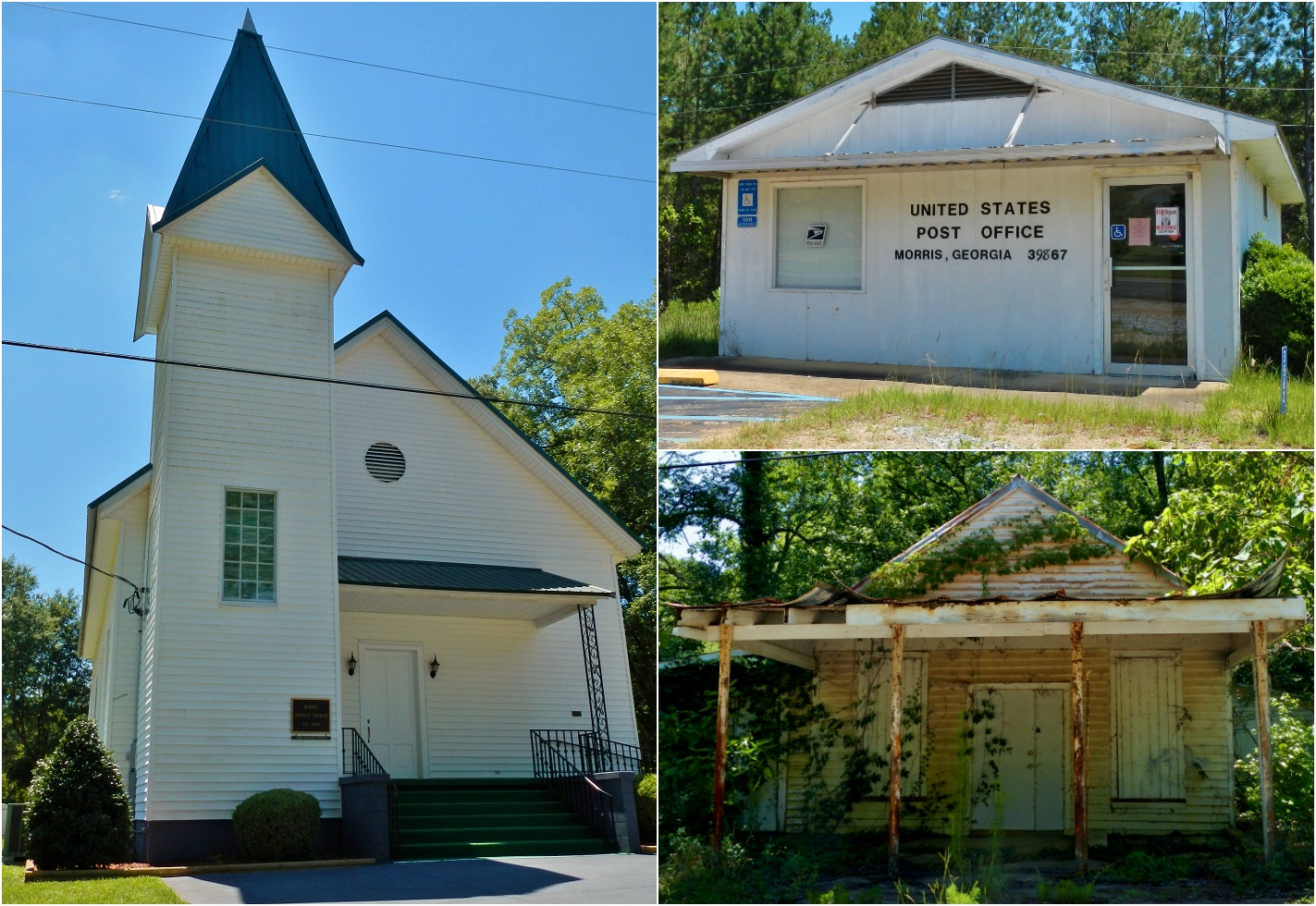
- Morris in 2012.

- Location within the state of Georgia Morris (the United States)
- Coordinates: 31°47′40″N 84°56′47″W
- Country: United States
- State: Georgia
- County: Quitman
- Elevation: 249 ft (76 m)
- Time zone: UTC-5 (Eastern (EST))
  - Summer (DST): UTC-4 (EDT)
- ZIP codes: 39867
- GNIS feature ID: 332421

Morris (also Morris Station) is an unincorporated community in southeastern Quitman County, Georgia, United States. Its elevation is 249 feet (76 m). It has a ZIP code of 39867. The community lies a short distance to the south of U.S. Route 82, to the southeast of the city of Georgetown, the county seat of Quitman County.

== History ==
The Georgia General Assembly incorporated Morris as a town in 1911. The community most likely was named after James Morris, the son of a railroad agent. The municipal charter of Morris was repealed in 1995.
