= Shaheen-Goodfellow Weekend Cottage =

Historic house in Arkansas, United States

- U.S. National Register of Historic Places
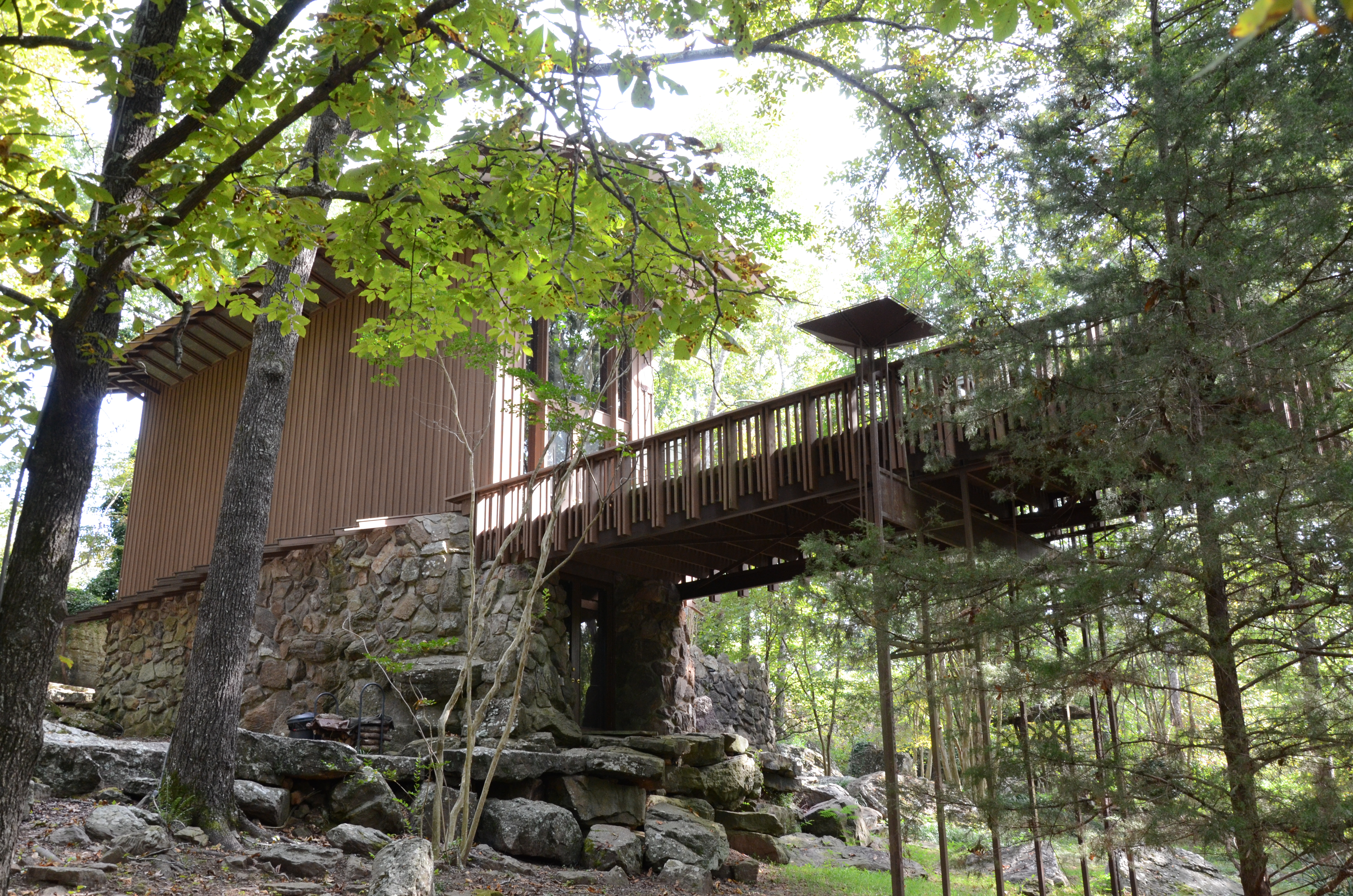

- Location within Arkansas Location within the United States
- Location: 704 Stony Ridge, Eden Isle, Arkansas
- Coordinates: 35°30′0″N 92°6′30″W
- Area: 1.3 acres (0.53 ha)
- Built: 1965
- Architect: E. Fay Jones
- Architectural style: Modern Movement
- MPS: Arkansas Designs of E. Fay Jones MPS AD
- NRHP reference No.: 97000854
- Added to NRHP: October 30, 2002

The Shaheen-Goodfellow Weekend Cottage, also known as Stoneflower, is a historic house at 704 Stony Ridge Road in Eden Isle, Arkansas, a resort community on a peninsula jutting into Greers Ferry Lake west of Heber Springs. It is a distinctive Modern structure, designed by Arkansas architect E. Fay Jones and completed in 1965. The main structure is a relatively small rectangular wood-frame structure, given vertical emphasis by its placement at the top of a slope and vertical board-and-batten siding. On the lake side (the downslope side) of the house a wooden deck projects from the upper level, with vertical railing elements and an outdoor cooking area built in. The house is a clear predecessor to one of Jones' signature works, Thorncrown Chapel, with which it shares design and construction methods, albeit in a smaller scale.

The house was listed on the National Register of Historic Places in 2002.

== See also ==
- National Register of Historic Places listings in Cleburne County, Arkansas
