= Brewer School =

- U.S. National Register of Historic Places
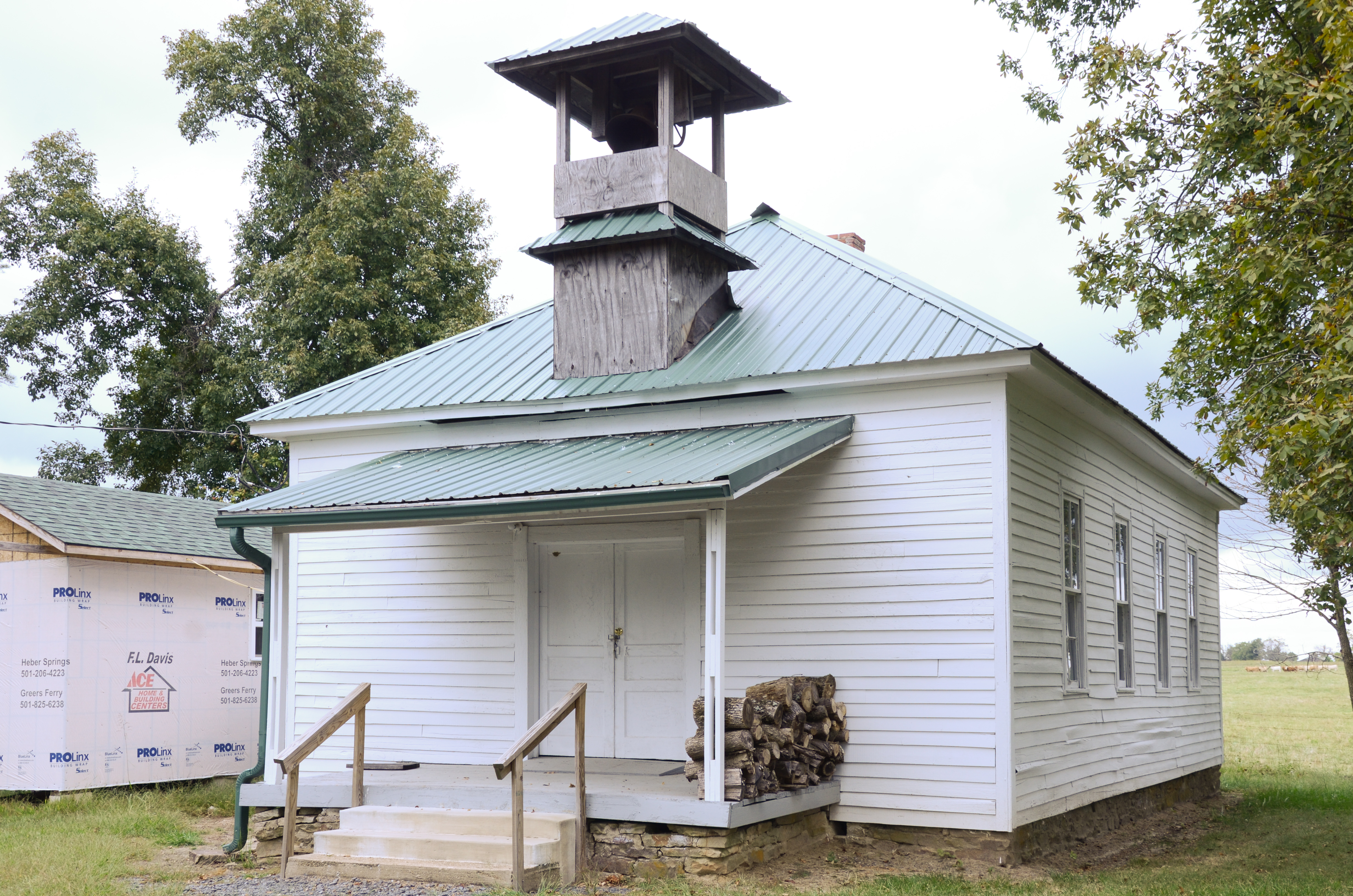

- Location within Arkansas Location within the United States
- Location: Brewer Rd, Brewer, Arkansas
- Coordinates: 35°40′9″N 92°10′57″W
- Area: 1 acre (0.40 ha)
- Built: 1910
- NRHP reference No.: 04000506
- Added to NRHP: May 26, 2004

The Brewer School is a historic school building on Brewer Road in Brewer, Arkansas. It is a vernacular single-story wood-frame structure, with a hip roof, weatherboard siding, and a stone foundation. A shed-roof porch shelters the entrance, and a belfry projects from the front slope of the roof. The school was built in 1910, and served as a one-room schoolhouse until 1950. It is still used as a community meeting and polling place.

The building was listed on the National Register of Historic Places in 2004.

== See also ==
- National Register of Historic Places listings in Cleburne County, Arkansas
