= Quitman County School District (Georgia) =

School district in Georgia, United States

Address
- 215 Kaigler Road Georgetown, Georgia, 39854-4841; United States
- Coordinates: 31.888599°N 85.080764°W

District information
- Superintendent: Jon E. Jones
- NCES District ID: 1304290

Students and staff
- Enrollment: 317 (2022–23)
- Faculty: 24.80
- Staff: 42.30
- Student–teacher ratio: 12.78

Other information
- Telephone: (229) 334-4189
- Website: quitman.k12.ga.us

The Quitman County School District is a public school district in Quitman County, Georgia, United States, based in Georgetown. It serves the communities of Georgetown and Morris.

== Schools ==
The Quitman County School District has three schools that house pre-school to twelfth grade on one campus.

=== Elementary and middle school ===
- New Quitman County Elementary/Middle School (pre-kindergarten - 8th grade)

=== High school ===
- Quitman County High School (grades 9–12)

This is the newest school in the Quitman County School System. Established in 2009, it split from neighboring Stewart County High School. QCHS has 10,000 square feet (930 m^{2}) of space. Each classroom is equipped with smart board technology. The new facility includes a media center, band room, and weight room. The gymnasium seats over 500 people. Its principal is Jon-Erik Jones.
