= Quitman Home Economics Building =

- U.S. National Register of Historic Places
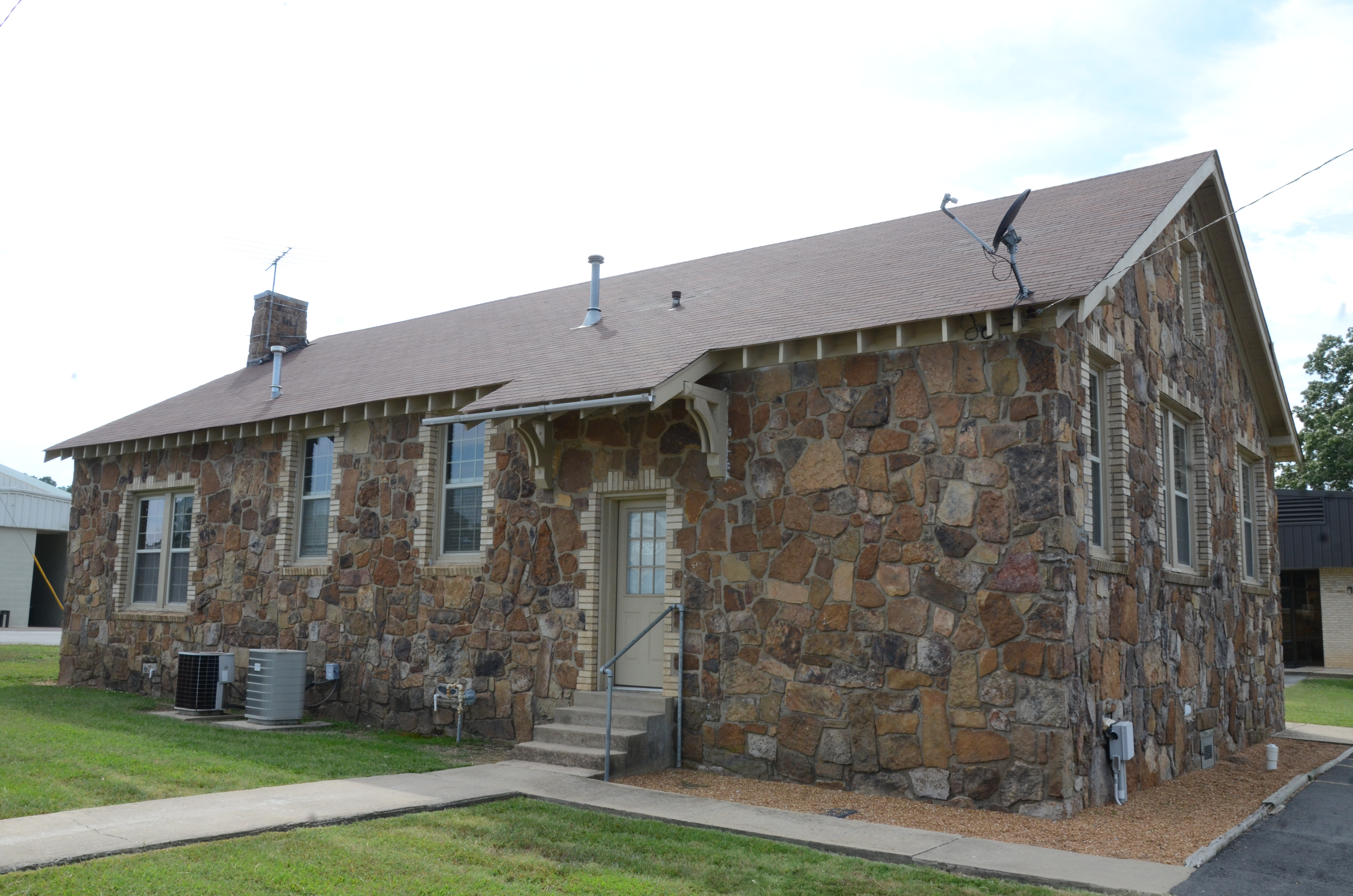

- Location within Arkansas Location within the United States
- Location: 2nd Ave., Quitman, Arkansas
- Coordinates: 35°22′47″N 92°13′17″W
- Area: less than one acre
- Built by: National Youth Administration
- Architectural style: Bungalow/craftsman
- MPS: Public Schools in the Ozarks MPS
- NRHP reference No.: 92001127
- Added to NRHP: September 4, 1992

The Quitman Home Economics Building is a historic school building on 2nd Avenue in Quitman, Arkansas. It is a single story masonry structure, with walls of fieldstone and brick trim around the openings. The roof is gabled, with exposed rafter ends, and a shed-roof extension over the main entrance, supported by large brackets, all in the Craftsman style. It was built in 1938 with funding from the National Youth Administration.

The building was listed on the National Register of Historic Places in 1992.

== See also ==
- National Register of Historic Places listings in Cleburne County, Arkansas
