= Quitman High School (Arkansas) =

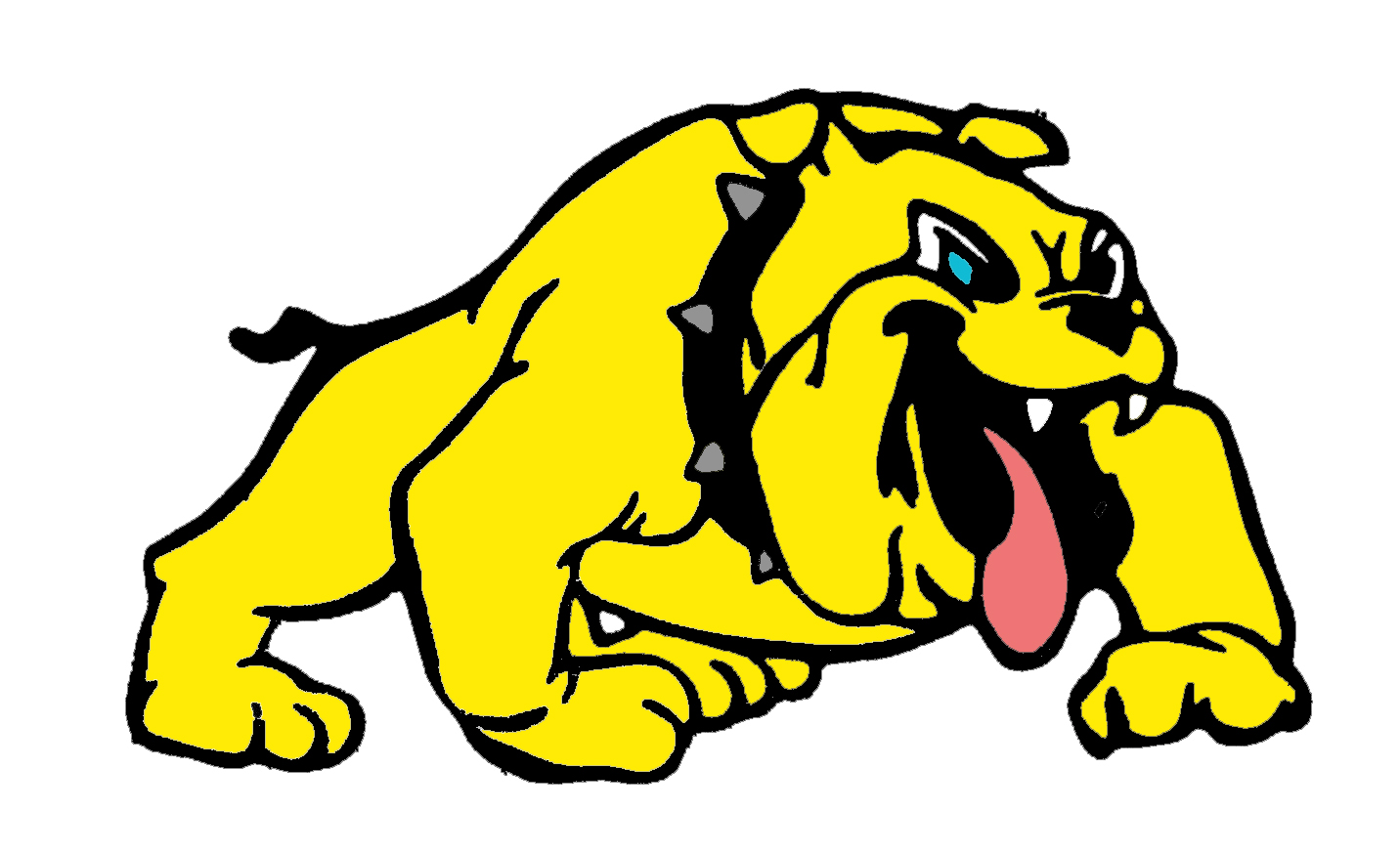

Location
- 6275 Heber Springs Road West; Quitman, Arkansas 72131; United States
- Coordinates: 35°23′32″N 92°11′45″W

Information
- Type: Public
- NCES District ID: 0511880
- CEEB code: 042135
- NCES School ID: 051188000947
- Principal: Michael Stacks
- Grades: 7–12
- Enrollment: 275 (2023-2024)
- Colors: Black and gold
- Mascot: Bulldog
- Website: www.quitmansd.org
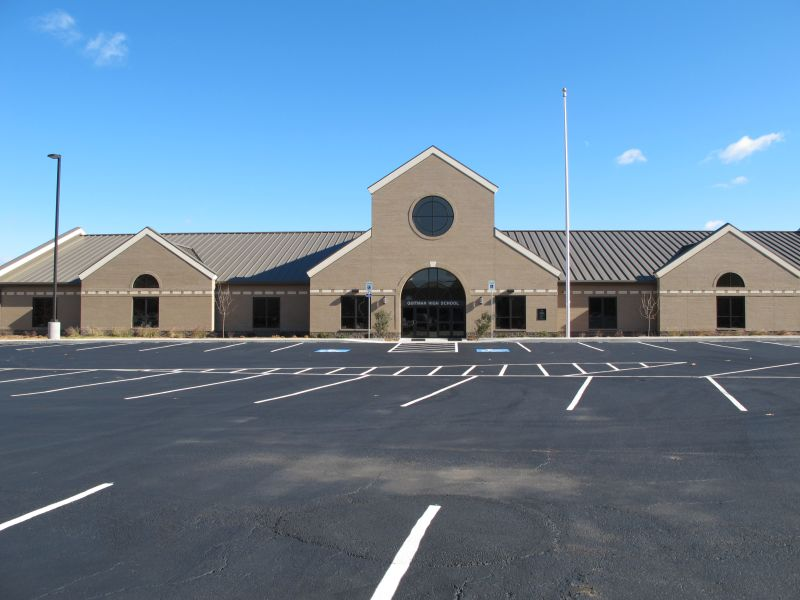

Quitman High School is a comprehensive public junior/senior high school for grades seven through twelve serving the community of Quitman, Arkansas, United States. Quitman High School is the only high school managed in rural Cleburne County by the Quitman School District.

== Academics ==
The assumed course of study follows the Smart Core curriculum developed by the Arkansas Department of Education (ADE). Students complete regular (core and career focus) courses and exams and may select Advanced Placement (AP) coursework and exams with the opportunity for college credit. Quitman is associated with the Conway Area Career Center to support the students' career and technical education needs.

== Extracurricular activities ==
The Quitman High School mascot is the bulldog and black and gold serve as the school colors. For the 2012–2014 seasons, the Quitman Bulldogs participated in the 2A-5 Conference. Competition is primarily sanctioned by the Arkansas Activities Association with the Bulldogs competing in baseball, basketball (boys/girls), cheer, football, golf (boys/girls), softball, and track and field.

In the 2016-17 season, the Quitman High Lady Bulldogs won their first state championship, beating Hector Lady Wildcats 66-36, after having lost in the semi-finals last a year prior to the same team.
