= Quitman County, Georgia =

County in Georgia, United States

- County
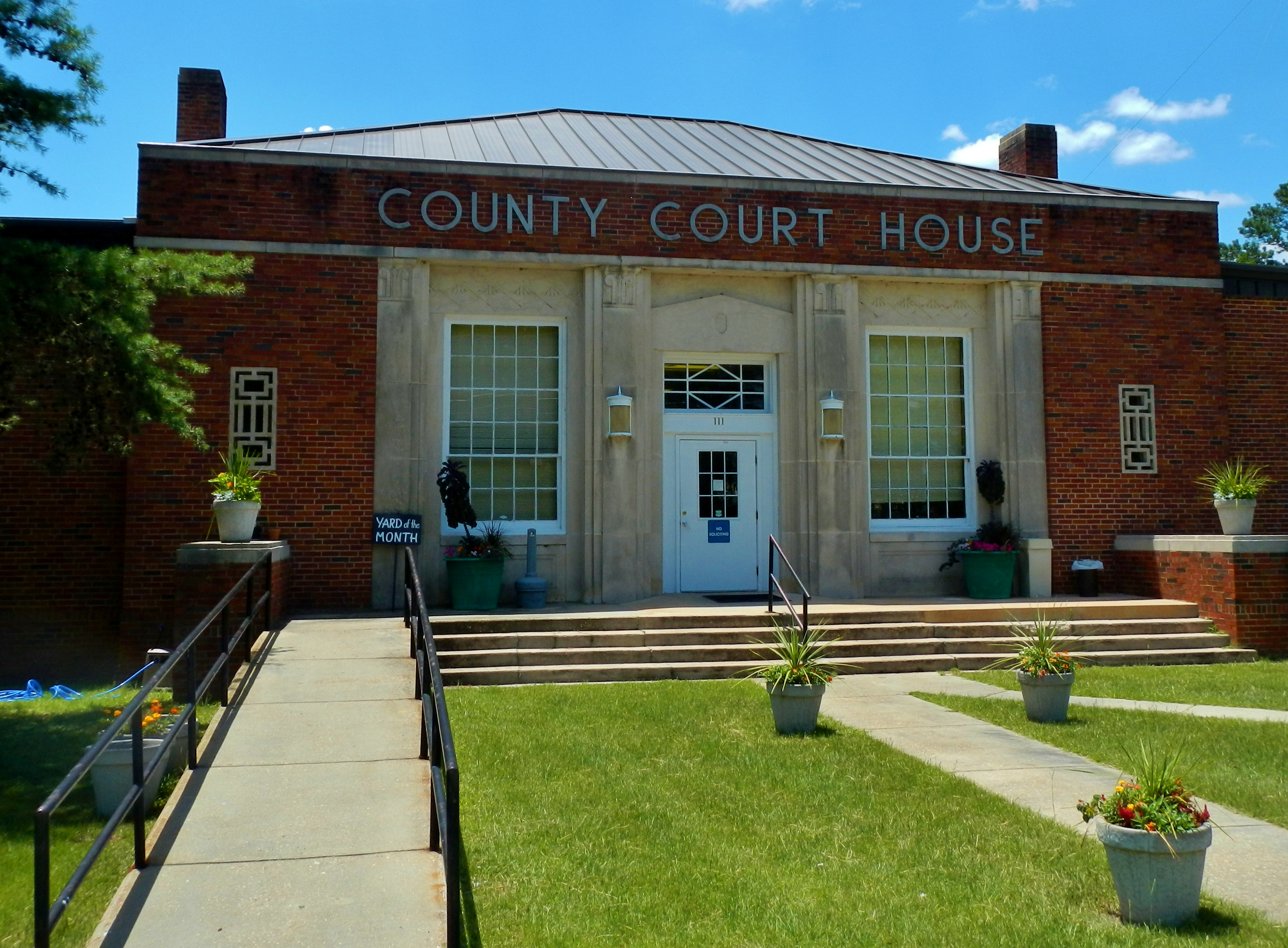
- Quitman County Courthouse in Georgetown

- Seal

- Location within the U.S. state of Georgia
- Coordinates: 31.86°N 85.01°W
- Country: United States
- State: Georgia
- Founded: December 10, 1858; 167 years ago
- Named for: John A. Quitman
- Seat: Georgetown
- Largest city: Georgetown

Area
  - Total: 161 sq mi (420 km^{2})
  - Land: 151 sq mi (390 km^{2})
  - Water: 9.3 sq mi (24 km^{2}) 5.8%

Population (2020)
  - Total: 2,235
  - Estimate (2025): 2,254 ▲
  - Density: 14.8/sq mi (5.71/km^{2})
- Time zone: UTC−5 (Eastern)
  - Summer (DST): UTC−4 (EDT)
- Congressional district: 2nd
- Website: gqc-ga.org

Quitman County is a county located in the southwestern part of the U.S. state of Georgia. As of the 2020 census, the population was 2,235, making it the second-least populous county in Georgia. The county seat is Georgetown. The county was created on December 10, 1858, and named after General John A. Quitman, leader in the Mexican–American War, and once Governor of Mississippi. In November 2006, residents voted to consolidate the city government of Georgetown and the county government of Quitman into a consolidated city-county.

== Geography ==
According to the U.S. Census Bureau, the county has a total area of 161 square miles (420 km^{2}), of which 151 square miles (390 km^{2}) is land and 9.3 square miles (24 km^{2}) (5.8%) is water. The entirety of Quitman County is located in the Middle Chattahoochee River–Walter F. George Lake sub-basin of the ACF River Basin (Apalachicola-Chattahoochee-Flint River Basin).

=== Major highways ===
- U.S. Route 82 / State Route 50
- State Route 27
- State Route 39

=== Adjacent counties ===
- Stewart County (north)
- Randolph County (east)
- Clay County (south)
- Barbour County, Alabama (west/CST Border)

=== National protected area ===
- Eufaula National Wildlife Refuge (part)

== Communities ==
=== City ===
- Georgetown (county seat)

=== Unincorporated community ===
- Morris

== Demographics ==
Historical population
Census	Pop.	Note	%±
1860	3,499		—
1870	4,150		18.6%
1880	4,392		5.8%
1890	4,471		1.8%
1900	4,701		5.1%
1910	4,594		−2.3%
1920	3,417		−25.6%
1930	3,820		11.8%
1940	3,435		−10.1%
1950	3,015		−12.2%
1960	2,432		−19.3%
1970	2,180		−10.4%
1980	2,357		8.1%
1990	2,209		−6.3%
2000	2,598		17.6%
2010	2,513		−3.3%
2020	2,235		−11.1%
2025 (est.)	2,254	▲	0.9%
U.S. Decennial Census; 1790-1880 1890-1910; 1920-1930 1930-1940; 1940-1950 1960-1980; 1980-2000 2010

=== Racial and ethnic composition ===
Quitman County, Georgia – Racial and ethnic composition Note: the US Census treats Hispanic/Latino as an ethnic category. This table excludes Latinos from the racial categories and assigns them to a separate category. Hispanics/Latinos may be of any race.
Race / Ethnicity (NH = Non-Hispanic)	Pop 1980	Pop 1990	Pop 2000	Pop 2010	Pop 2020	% 1980	% 1990	% 2000	% 2010	% 2020
White alone (NH)	1,017	1,092	1,351	1,265	1,190	43.15%	49.43%	52.00%	50.34%	53.24%
Black or African American alone (NH)	1,318	1,107	1,213	1,198	917	55.92%	50.11%	46.69%	47.67%	41.03%
Native American or Alaska Native alone (NH)	1	6	5	3	13	0.04%	0.27%	0.19%	0.12%	0.58%
Asian alone (NH)	1	3	1	2	12	0.04%	0.14%	0.04%	0.08%	0.54%
Native Hawaiian or Pacific Islander alone (NH)	x	x	0	0	0	x	x	0.00%	0.00%	0.00%
Other race alone (NH)	0	0	1	0	9	0.00%	0.00%	0.04%	0.00%	0.40%
Mixed race or Multiracial (NH)	x	x	14	11	63	x	x	0.54%	0.44%	2.82%
Hispanic or Latino (any race)	20	1	13	34	31	0.85%	0.05%	0.50%	1.35%	1.39%
Total	2,357	2,209	2,598	2,513	2,235	100.00%	100.00%	100.00%	100.00%	100.00%

=== 2020 census ===
As of the 2020 census, the county had a population of 2,235 and a median age of 53.7 years, with 16.3% of residents under the age of 18 and 31.1% aged 65 or older; for every 100 females there were 98.0 males and for every 100 females age 18 and over there were 99.4 males age 18 and over.

As of the 2020 census, 26.3% of residents lived in urban areas while 73.7% lived in rural areas.

As of the 2020 census, the racial makeup of the county was 53.2% White, 41.1% Black or African American, 0.6% American Indian and Alaska Native, 0.5% Asian, 0.0% Native Hawaiian and Pacific Islander, 0.4% from some other race, and 4.1% from two or more races; Hispanic or Latino residents of any race comprised 1.4% of the population.

As of the 2020 census, there were 998 households in the county, of which 22.0% had children under age 18 living with them and 30.5% had a female householder with no spouse or partner present; about 32.9% of all households were made up of individuals and 17.8% had someone living alone who was 65 years of age or older.

As of the 2020 census, there were 1,678 housing units, of which 40.5% were vacant; among occupied housing units, 77.6% were owner-occupied and 22.4% were renter-occupied, with homeowner and rental vacancy rates of 4.5% and 9.9%, respectively.

== Education ==
Quitman County School District operates area public schools, including Quitman County High School.

County students attended Stewart-Quitman High School (now Stewart County High School) from 1978, until Quitman County High opened, in 2009.

== Politics ==
United States presidential election results for Quitman County, Georgia
Year	Republican		Democratic		Third party(ies)	
Year	No.	%	No.	%	No.	%
1912	7	4.27%	152	92.68%	5	3.05%
1916	15	10.56%	125	88.03%	2	1.41%
1920	4	2.88%	135	97.12%	0	0.00%
1924	8	5.33%	138	92.00%	4	2.67%
1928	41	19.07%	174	80.93%	0	0.00%
1932	0	0.00%	239	98.35%	4	1.65%
1936	19	5.08%	355	94.92%	0	0.00%
1940	19	5.54%	324	94.46%	0	0.00%
1944	16	4.31%	355	95.69%	0	0.00%
1948	19	5.26%	246	68.14%	96	26.59%
1952	93	21.88%	332	78.12%	0	0.00%
1956	31	8.03%	355	91.97%	0	0.00%
1960	67	14.73%	388	85.27%	0	0.00%
1964	377	62.11%	230	37.89%	0	0.00%
1968	90	12.05%	198	26.51%	459	61.45%
1972	502	78.19%	140	21.81%	0	0.00%
1976	313	31.62%	677	68.38%	0	0.00%
1980	240	28.67%	589	70.37%	8	0.96%
1984	361	42.42%	490	57.58%	0	0.00%
1988	296	40.11%	436	59.08%	6	0.81%
1992	284	30.80%	523	56.72%	115	12.47%
1996	224	28.11%	514	64.49%	59	7.40%
2000	348	38.50%	542	59.96%	14	1.55%
2004	409	42.38%	543	56.27%	13	1.35%
2008	509	45.61%	597	53.49%	10	0.90%
2012	510	45.21%	612	54.26%	6	0.53%
2016	575	55.08%	461	44.16%	8	0.77%
2020	604	54.61%	497	44.94%	5	0.45%
2024	656	57.54%	480	42.11%	4	0.35%

United States Senate election results for Quitman County, Georgia2
Year	Republican		Democratic		Third party(ies)	
Year	No.	%	No.	%	No.	%
2020	600	55.30%	470	43.32%	15	1.38%
2020	548	54.20%	463	45.80%	0	0.00%

United States Senate election results for Quitman County, Georgia3
Year	Republican		Democratic		Third party(ies)	
Year	No.	%	No.	%	No.	%
2020	285	26.49%	283	26.30%	508	47.21%
2020	604	54.86%	497	45.14%	0	0.00%
2022	511	56.65%	378	41.91%	13	1.44%
2022	477	59.11%	330	40.89%	0	0.00%

Georgia Gubernatorial election results for Quitman County
Year	Republican		Democratic		Third party(ies)	
Year	No.	%	No.	%	No.	%
2022	555	61.26%	350	38.63%	1	0.11%

As of the 2020s, Quitman County is a Republican stronghold, voting 58% for Donald Trump in 2024. From the 1940s to 1960s Joe Hurst dominated politics in Quitman County, delivering votes for statewide officials, state judges, and prosecuting attorneys, under the County unit system which gave Quitman two units, a third as many as the biggest counties in the state. He hand-delivered state welfare checks and prevented secret ballots. In 1962 he stuffed the ballot box for future President Jimmy Carter's opponent in a state senate primary. Carter won a series of court cases to remove his Democratic primary opponent's name from the general election ballot. There was no Republican candidate. Both candidates used radio ads to ask voters to vote by write-in, and Carter won the general election. Hurst was later convicted of fraud in an earlier primary, for which he had a fine and three years probation. He was also convicted of selling moonshine, for which he went to prison.

For elections to the United States House of Representatives, Quitman County is part of Georgia's 2nd congressional district, currently represented by Sanford Bishop. For elections to the Georgia State Senate, Quitman County is part of District 12. For elections to the Georgia House of Representatives, Quitman County is part of District 154.

== See also ==
- National Register of Historic Places listings in Quitman County, Georgia
- List of counties in Georgia
