= Quitman County High School =

Location
- 173 Kaigler Road; Georgetown, Quitman County, Georgia 39854; United States
- 31°53′20″N 85°04′55″W

Information
- Type: Public
- Established: 2009
- School district: Quitman County School District
- NCES School ID: 130429003850
- Teaching staff: 7.50 (on an FTE basis)
- Grades: 9 - 12
- Enrollment: 109 (2024-2025)
- Student to teacher ratio: 14.53
- Colors: Maroon and Vegas gold
- Mascot: Hornet
- Website: Quitman County High School

Quitman County High School is a public high school in the Quitman County School District of Georgetown, Quitman County, Georgia. It was established in July 2009 as the newest, and one of the smallest, high schools in the U.S. state of Georgia. As the newest addition of the K-12 school format that the school district has adopted, it now serves students in grades nine through twelve.

The school is located on Kaigler Road in Georgetown off of U.S. Hwy. 82. Because of the hill-like topography of the school's location, its students have nicknamed it according to their mascot, "Hornet Hill," and the school itself the "Hornet Nation."

== History ==
Since the burning of Georgetown High School in the 1970s, beginning in 1978 the Quitman County School District had shared its students with the nearby Stewart County High School (formerly Stewart-Quitman High School) in Lumpkin.

In 2007, the Quitman County Board of Education began partnering with community members and leaders to acquire funds for building the new school. The county was to pay $4.5 million. Because of the city's lack of commercial revenue and its overwhelming dependence on property and sales taxes, this placed an enormous toll on the city/county's populace.

In 2009, construction of the new high school was completed under the administration of Superintendent William D. Burns. The prospective initial enrollment was 45. The school was to have a gymnasium, a room for band activities, and between eight and eleven classrooms, and it was to be an addition to the K-8 school.
