= Quitman School District (Arkansas) =

School district in Arkansas, United States

Location
- 6275 Heber Springs Road West; Quitman, Arkansas 72131 United States
- Coordinates: 35°23′32.4″N 92°11′45.1″W

District information
- Type: Public
- Grades: KG–12
- Established: 1897
- Accreditation: Arkansas Department of Education
- Schools: 2
- NCES District ID: 0511880

Students and staff
- Students: 817 (2021-2022)
- Teachers: 63.42 (2021-2022)
- Student–teacher ratio: 12.88 (2021-2022)
- District mascot: Bulldogs
- Colors: Black Gold

Other information
- Federal Funding: Title I A Title II A Title VI (REAP)
- Website: www.quitmansd.org

Quitman School District is an accredited public school district providing comprehensive early childhood, elementary and secondary education to students in and around the rural, distant communities of Quitman, Arkansas, United States.

Formed in 1897, when the Quitman Male and Female College consolidated with Central Collegiate Institute of Conway to become what is now named Hendrix College. The former Quitman College turns into Quitman Public School until the facility burned in a fire in 1932. A new Quitman Elementary School is constructed and remains in use until 1964. Now, that building serves as the Building Trades facility for Quitman High School.

== Schools ==
- Quitman High School—provides secondary education in grades 7 through 12.
- Quitman Elementary School—provides elementary education in kindergarten through grade 6.
