= Guy Home Economics Building =

United States historic places

- U.S. National Register of Historic Places
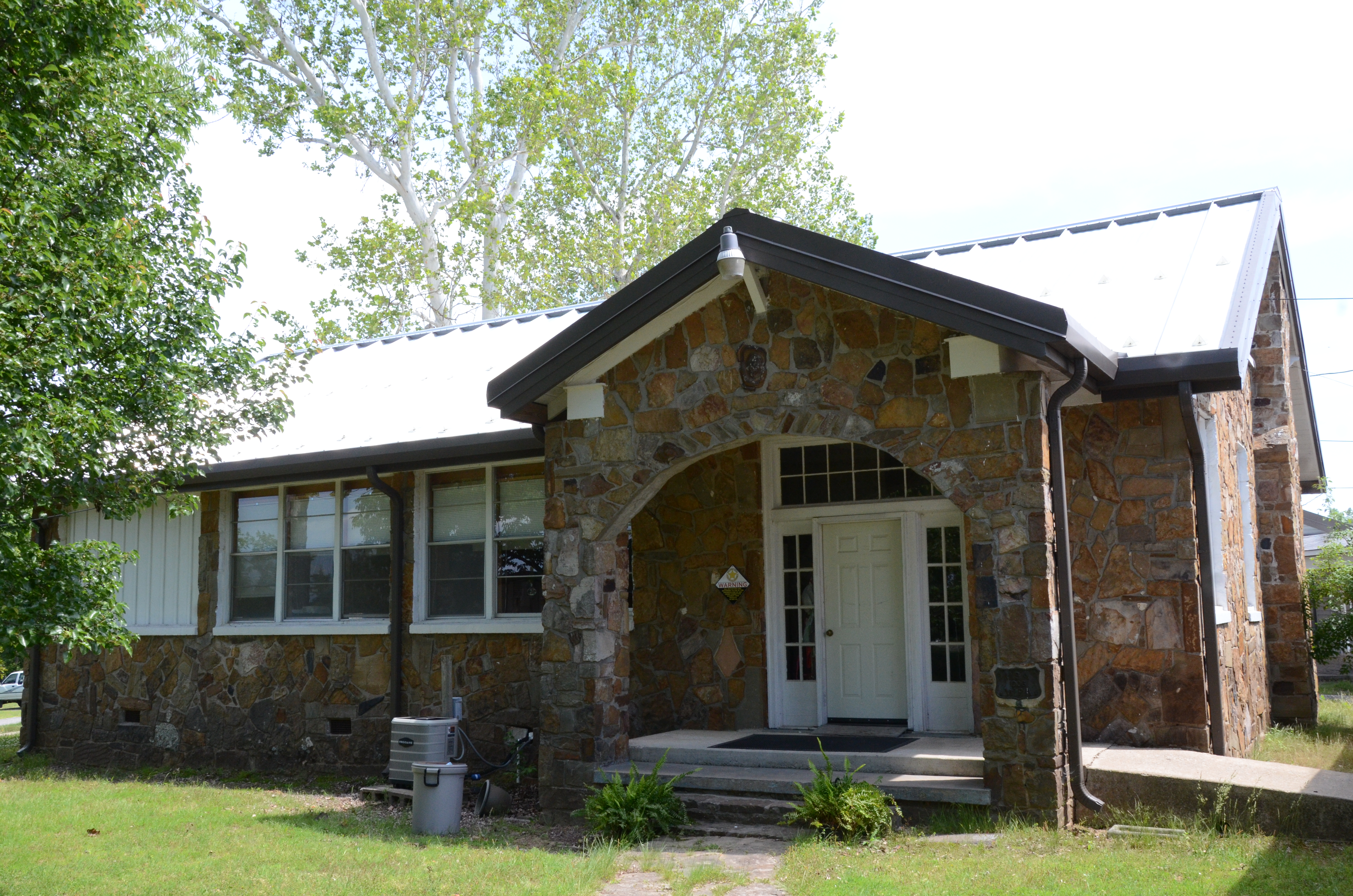

- Location within Arkansas Location within the United States
- Location: AR 25, Guy, Arkansas
- Coordinates: 35°19′25″N 92°19′22″W
- Area: less than one acre
- Built by: Works Progress Administration
- Architectural style: Bungalow/American craftsman
- MPS: Public Schools in the Ozarks MPS
- NRHP reference No.: 92001197
- Added to NRHP: September 10, 1992

The Guy Home Economics Building is a historic school building on the campus of the Guy-Perkins School District, east of Guy, Arkansas. It is a single story stone structure, with a gabled roof that features exposed rafter ends and large Craftsman brackets at the gable ends. A single-story gabled porch, with an arched opening, shelters the main entrance. It was built in 1936 with funding support from the Works Progress Administration.

The building was listed on the National Register of Historic Places in 1992.

== See also ==
- Guy High School Gymnasium
- National Register of Historic Places listings in Faulkner County, Arkansas
