= Ida, Arkansas =

- Unincorporated community
- Location within Arkansas Location within the United States
- Coordinates: 35°35′17″N 91°55′41″W
- Country: United States
- State: Arkansas
- County: Cleburne
- Elevation: 997 ft (304 m)
- Time zone: UTC-6 (Central (CST))
  - Summer (DST): UTC-5 (CDT)
- ZIP code: 72546
- Area code: 501
- GNIS feature ID: 50480

Ida is an unincorporated community in Cleburne County, Arkansas, United States. Ida is located on Arkansas Highway 25, 9 miles (14 km) northeast of Heber Springs. Ida has a post office with ZIP code 72546., Ida also hosts a hair-salon and convenience store
