= Quitman School District =

School district in Mississippi

The Quitman School District is a public school district based in Quitman, Mississippi (USA).

In addition to Quitman, the district serves the towns of Pachuta, Shubuta, and Stonewall as well as the census-designated place of De Soto and most rural areas in Clarke County.

== Schools ==
- Quitman High School (Grades 9-12)
- Quitman Junior High School (Grades 6-8)
- Quitman Upper Elementary School (Grades 3-5)
- Quitman Lower Elementary School (Grades K-2)

== Demographics ==
=== 2006-07 school year ===
There were a total of 2,294 students enrolled in the Quitman School District during the 2006–2007 school year. The gender makeup of the district was 49% female and 51% male. The racial makeup of the district was 57.45% African American, 42.02% white, 0.26% Hispanic, 0.22% Native American, and 0.04% Asian. 63.1% of the district's students were eligible to receive free lunch.

=== Previous school years ===
School Year	Enrollment	Gender Makeup		Racial Makeup				
School Year	Enrollment	Female	Male	Asian	African American	Hispanic	Native American	White
2005-06	2,378	49%	51%	–	56.56%	0.17%	0.08%	43.19%
2004-05	2,361	49%	51%	–	55.70%	0.13%	–	44.18%
2003-04	2,368	49%	51%	0.08%	54.69%	0.13%	–	45.10%
2002-03	2,428	49%	51%	0.08%	53.46%	0.04%	–	46.42%

== Accountability statistics ==
	2006-07	2005-06	2004-05	2003-04	2002-03
District Accreditation Status	Accredited	Accredited	Accredited	Accredited	Accredited
School Performance Classifications
Level 5 (Superior Performing) Schools	0	0	0	0	0
Level 4 (Exemplary) Schools	0	0	1	1	2
Level 3 (Successful) Schools	3	3	2	2	1
Level 2 (Under Performing) Schools	0	0	0	0	0
Level 1 (Low Performing) Schools	0	0	0	0	0
Not Assigned	1	1	1	1	1

== See also ==
- List of school districts in Mississippi
