= Georgetown, Quitman County, Georgia =

Georgetown
- Consolidated city-county
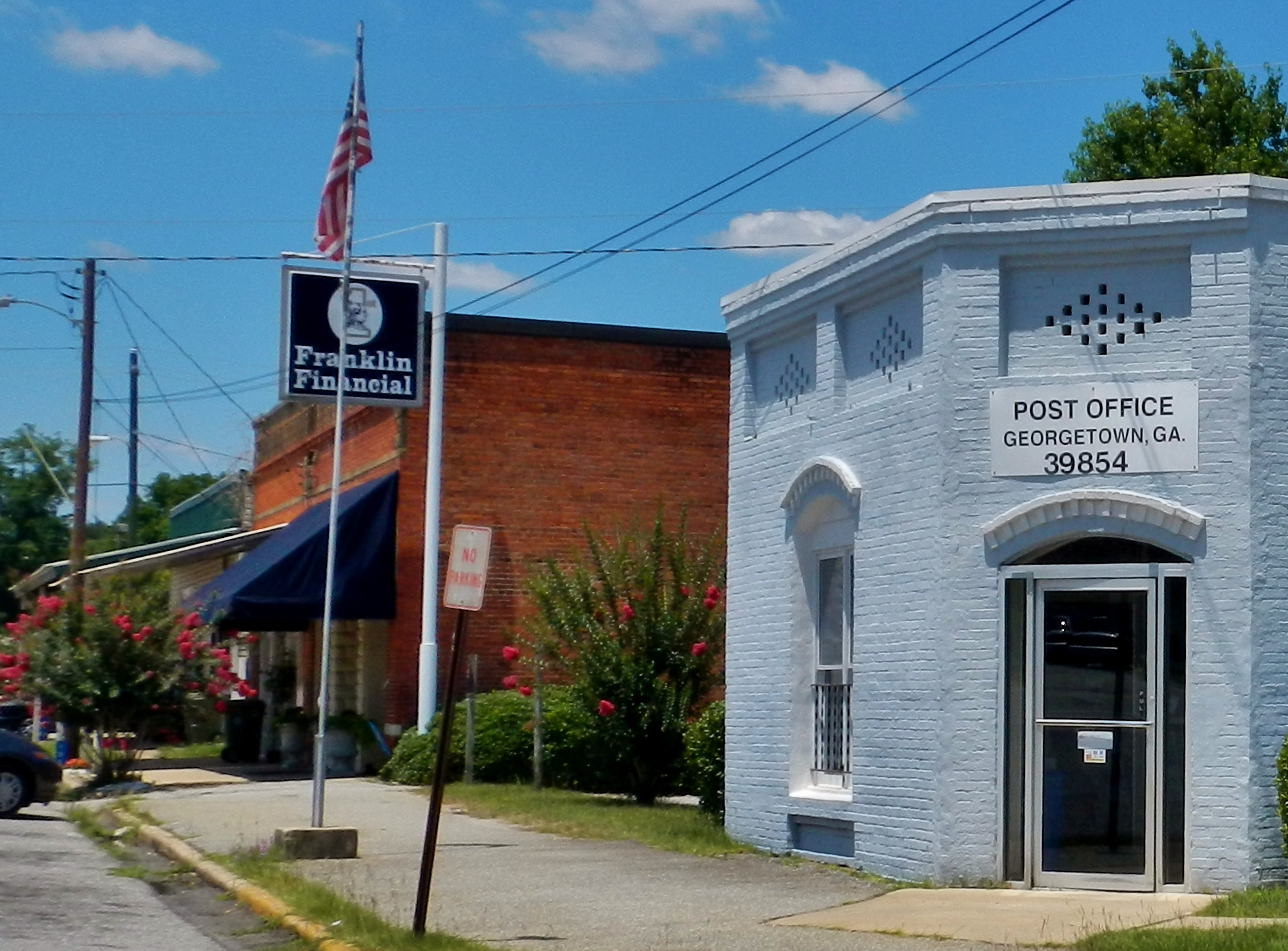
- Georgetown in 2012.

- Seal

- Location in Quitman County and the state of Georgia
- Coordinates: 31°53′02″N 85°06′05″W
- Country: United States
- State: Georgia
- Counties: Quitman

Area
  - Total: 3.9 sq mi (10.2 km^{2})
  - Land: 2.7 sq mi (7.1 km^{2})
  - Water: 1.2 sq mi (3.1 km^{2})

Population (2020)
  - Total: 2,235
  - Density: 820/sq mi (310/km^{2})
- ZIP code s: 39854
- Area code: 229
- Website: gqc-ga.org

Georgetown is a city in Quitman County, Georgia, United States. It is on the Alabama-Georgia state line next to Walter F. George Lake and across the Chattahoochee River from Eufaula, Alabama. Per the 2020 census, the population was 2,235. In 2006, Georgetown and Quitman County voted to consolidate their governments, becoming the smallest such consolidated entity in the Lower 48 states.

== History ==
Settled in the early 1830s, Georgetown was first named Tobanana for the nearby creek. The Tobanana Post Office was established on January 10, 1833. On September 21, 1836, the name of the town was changed to "Georgetown" after the historic neighborhood in Washington, D.C.

Georgetown was designated in 1859 as the county seat of Quitman County and was laid out as a town by order of the Inferior Court. The town was incorporated by an act of the legislature on December 9, 1859.

A brigade of federal cavalry, commanded by General Benjamin Grierson, camped for a time near Georgetown on the banks of the Tobanana Creek at the close of the American Civil War.

Georgetown was destroyed by fire in 1903; every building except for the post office and three houses were destroyed.

== Geography ==
According to the United States Census Bureau, the city has a total area of 3.9 square miles (10 km^{2}), of which 2.7 square miles (7.0 km^{2}) is land and 1.2 square miles (3.1 km^{2}) (30.46%) is water.

U.S. Route 82, as well as Georgia State Routes 27 and 39, are the main highways through the city. U.S. 82 runs west–east through the city as Middle Street, leading west 3 mi (4.8 km) to Eufaula, Alabama across the Chattahoochee River and southeast 24 mi (39 km) to Cuthbert. GA-39 runs north–south through the city briefly concurrent with U.S. 82, leading north 22 mi (35 km) to Omaha and south 23 mi (37 km) to Fort Gaines. GA-27 begins in the city and leads northeast 24 mi (39 km) to Lumpkin.

== Demographics ==
Historical population
Census	Pop.	Note	%±
1870	263		—
1880	245		−6.8%
1890	348		42.0%
1900	348		0.0%
1910	313		−10.1%
1920	244		−22.0%
1930	345		41.4%
1940	367		6.4%
1950	550		49.9%
1960	554		0.7%
1970	860		55.2%
1980	935		8.7%
1990	913		−2.4%
2000	973		6.6%
2010	2,513		158.3%
2020	2,235		−11.1%
U.S. Decennial Census; 1850-1870 1870-1880; 1890-1910 1920-1930; 1940 1950 1960; 1970 1980 1990; 2000 2010 2020

=== Racial and ethnic composition ===
Georgetown, Georgia – Racial and ethnic composition Note: the US Census treats Hispanic/Latino as an ethnic category. This table excludes Latinos from the racial categories and assigns them to a separate category. Hispanics/Latinos may be of any race.
Race / Ethnicity (NH = Non-Hispanic)	Pop 2000	Pop 2010	Pop 2020	% 2000	% 2010	% 2020
White alone (NH)	387	1,265	1,190	39.77%	50.34%	53.24%
Black or African American alone (NH)	584	1,198	917	60.02%	47.67%	41.03%
Native American or Alaska Native alone (NH)	0	3	13	0.00%	0.12%	0.58%
Asian alone (NH)	1	2	12	0.10%	0.08%	0.54%
Native Hawaiian or Pacific Islander alone (NH)	0	0	0	0.00%	0.00%	0.00%
Other race alone (NH)	0	0	9	0.00%	0.00%	0.40%
Mixed race or Multiracial (NH)	1	11	63	0.10%	0.44%	2.82%
Hispanic or Latino (any race)	0	34	31	0.00%	1.35%	1.39%
Total	973	2,513	2,235	100.00%	100.00%	100.00%

=== 2000 census ===
In 2000, there were 973 people, 367 households, and 274 families residing in the city. The population density was 355.0 inhabitants per square mile (137.1/km^{2}). By the 2020 census, there were 2,235 people residing in the city, down from 2,513 in 2010.

== Education ==
The Quitman County School District holds grades pre-school to grade twelve. It consists of one elementary-middle school, and one high school that consists of grades ninth through twelfth. The district has 22 full-time teachers and over 314 students.

County students attended Stewart-Quitman High School (now Stewart County High School) from 1978, until Quitman County High opened, in 2009.

== Notable residents ==
- Bryant T. Castellow (1876–1962), born near Georgetown; a politician, educator and lawyer
- The Castellows, country music trio
- Gladys L. Catchings (1901–1992), born in Georgetown; a nurse, hospital administrator and educator

== Gallery ==
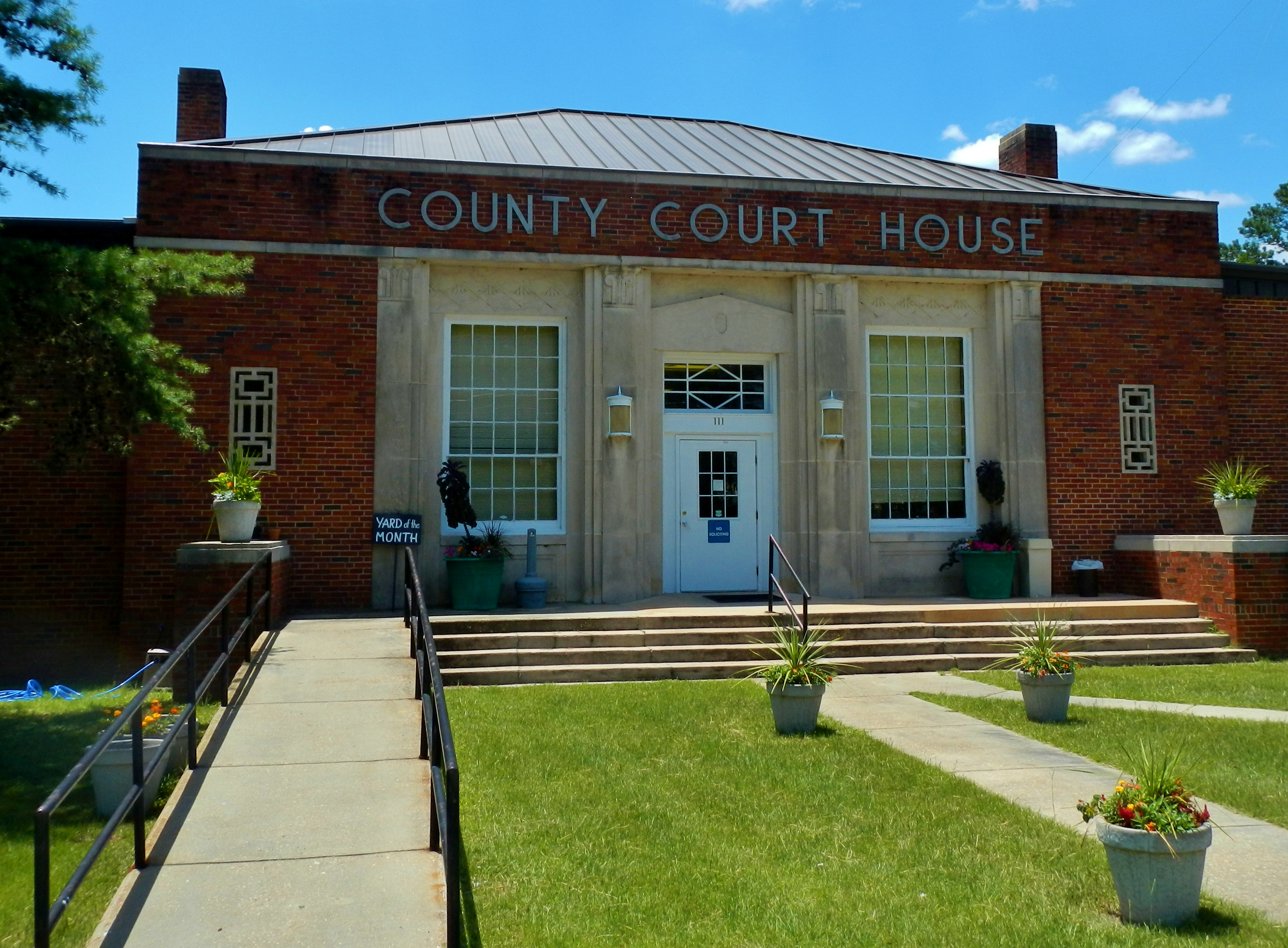
Quitman County Courthouse was built in 1939 by the Public Works Administration using federal relief funds. It was added to the National Register of Historic Places.

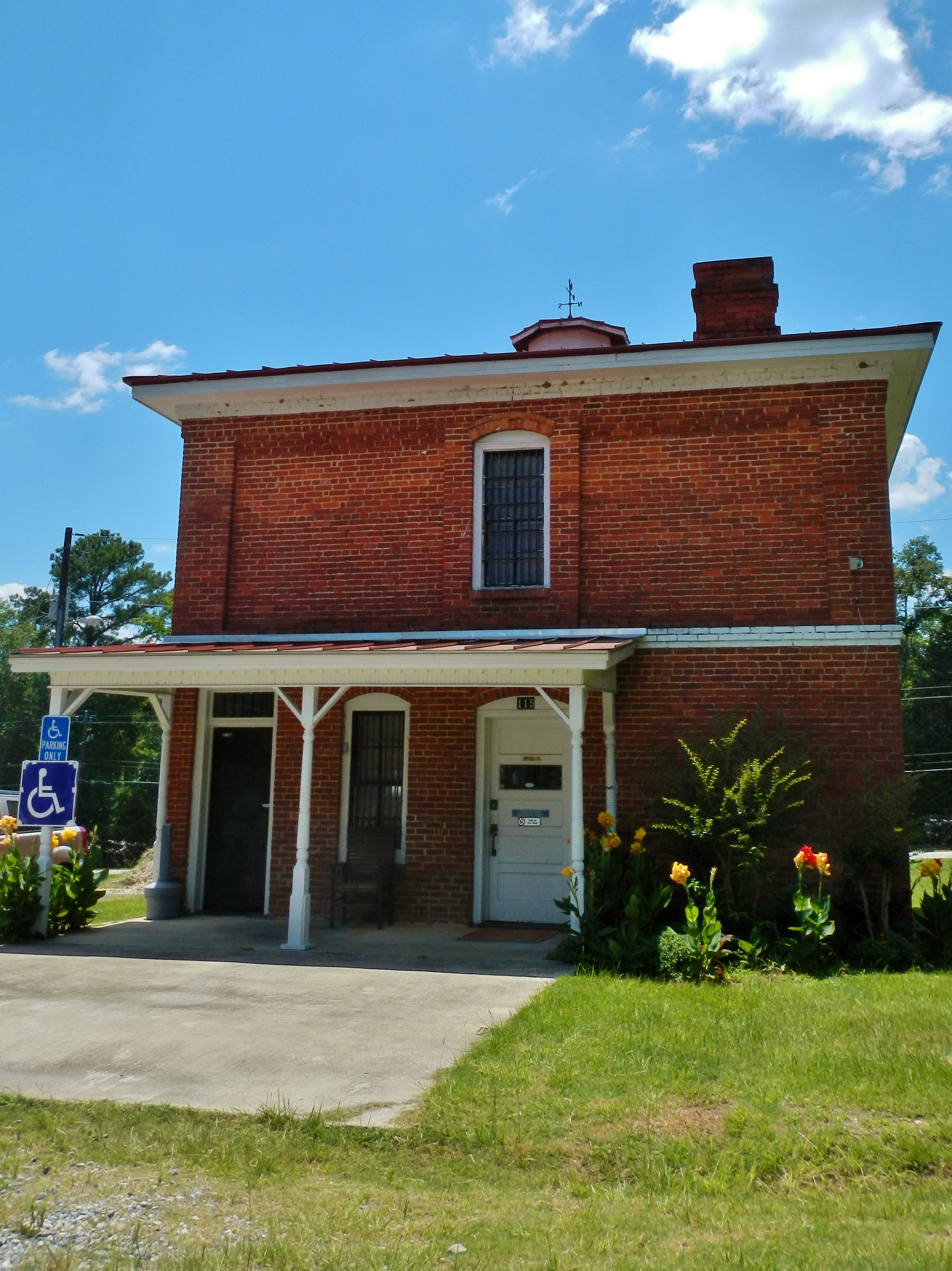
The old Quitman County Jail. It was added to the National Register of Historic Places.

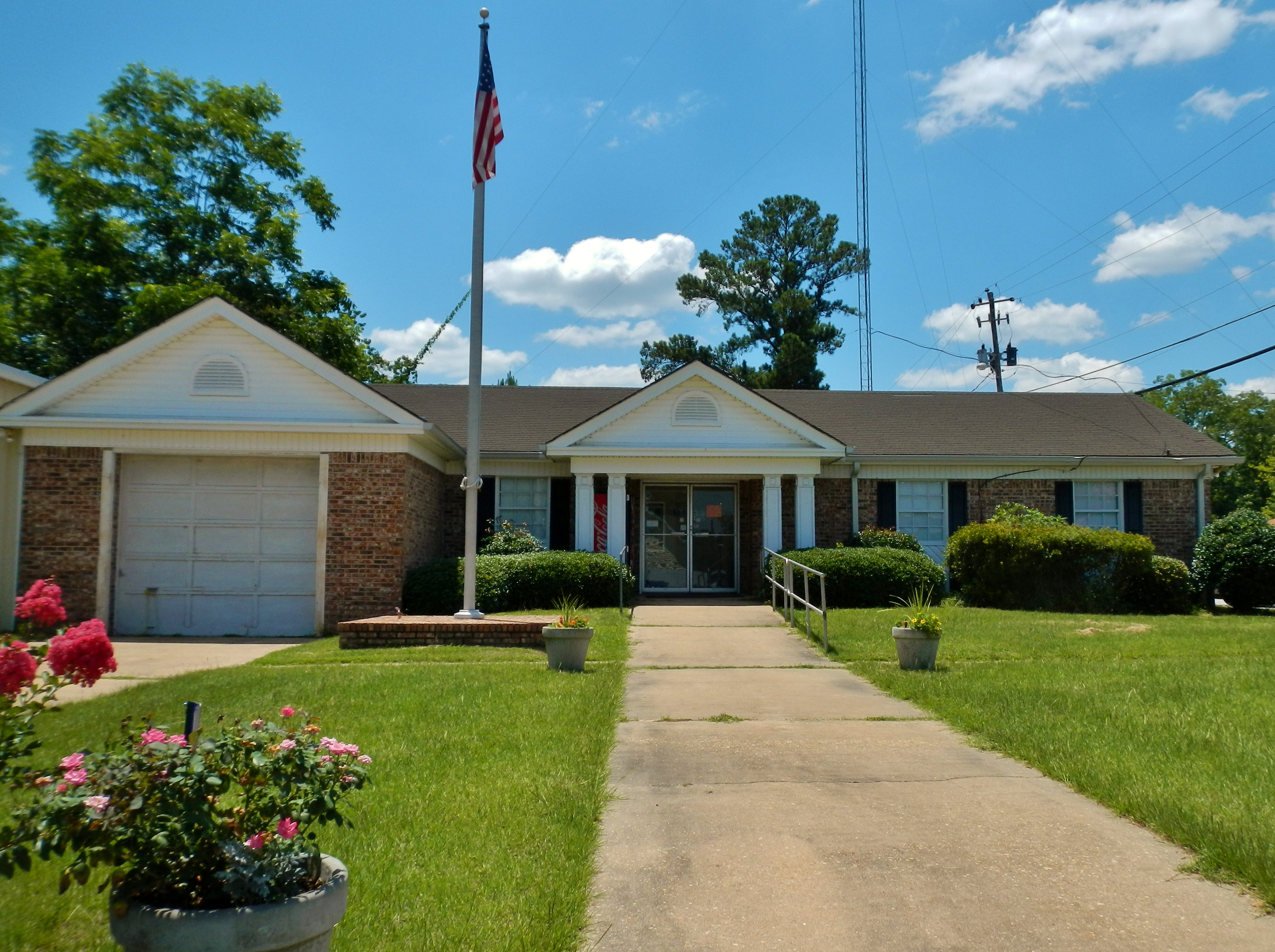
Georgetown City Hall.

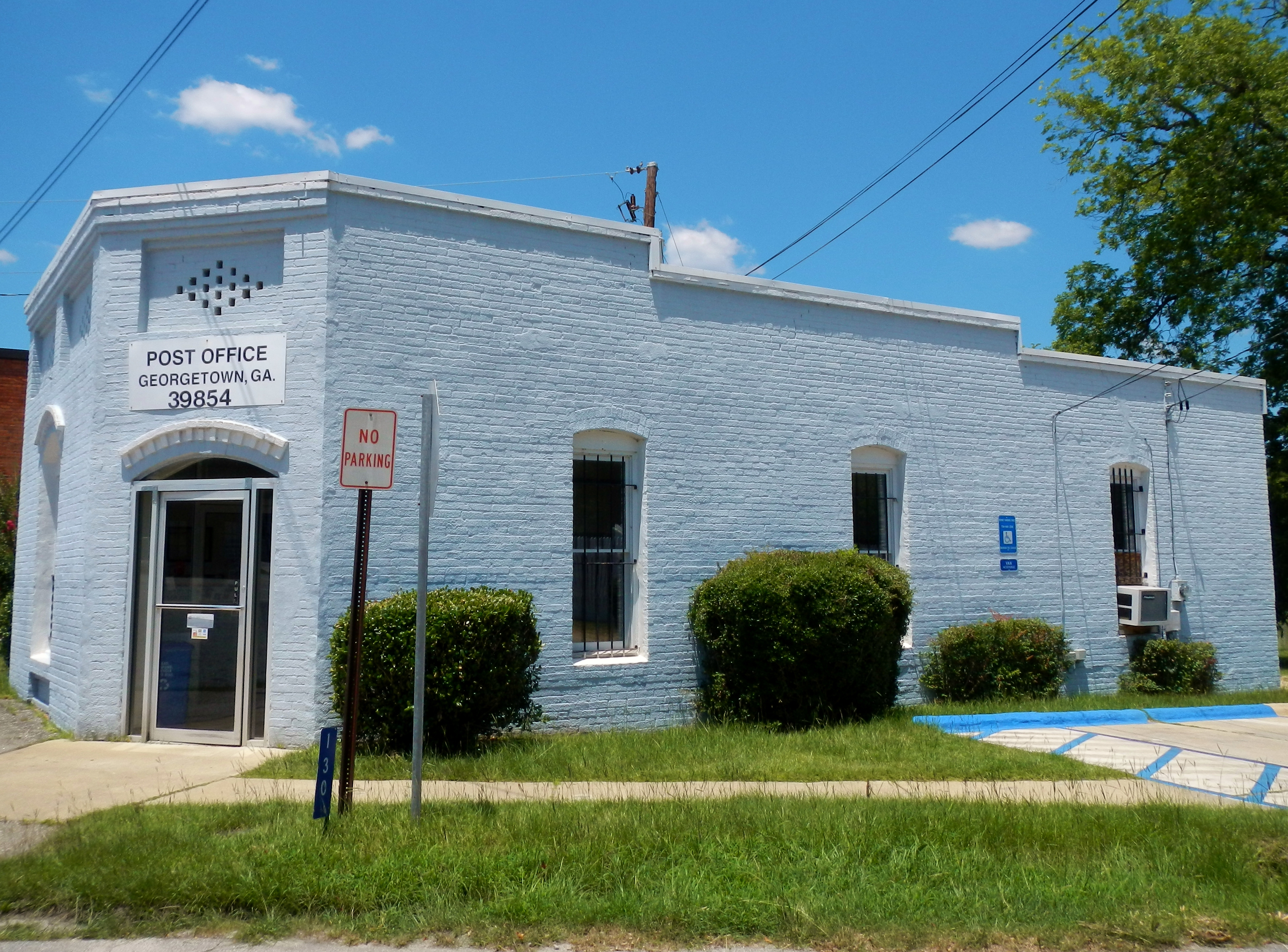
Georgetown Post Office (ZIP code: 39854)
