= Quitman, Arkansas =

City in north-central Arkansas, United States

- City
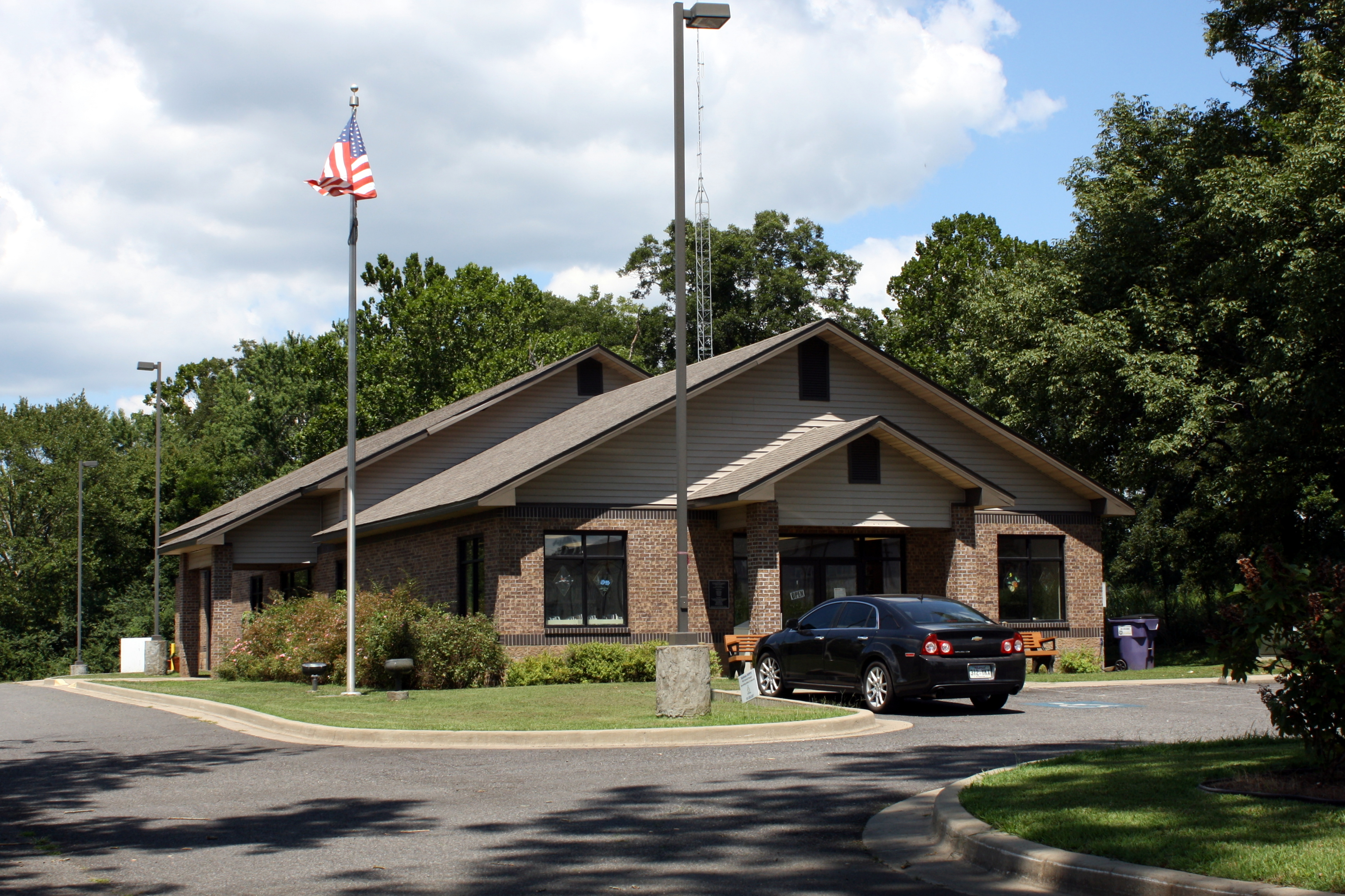
- Quitman Branch of the Cleburne County Library

- Location of Quitman in Cleburne County and Faulkner County, Arkansas.
- Coordinates: 35°22′25″N 92°13′15″W
- Country: United States
- State: Arkansas
- Counties: Cleburne, Faulkner

Area
  - City: 1.90 sq mi (4.91 km^{2})
  - Land: 1.90 sq mi (4.91 km^{2})
  - Water: 0 sq mi (0.00 km^{2})
- Elevation: 591 ft (180 m)

Population (2020)
  - City: 694
  - Estimate (2025): 704 ▲
  - Density: 366.3/sq mi (141.42/km^{2})
  - Metro: 748,031
- Time zone: UTC-6 (Central (CST))
  - Summer (DST): UTC-5 (CDT)
- ZIP code: 72131
- Area code: 501
- FIPS code: 05-57950
- GNIS feature ID: 2404582

Quitman is a city in Cleburne and Faulkner counties in the U.S. state of Arkansas. As of the 2020 census, Quitman had a population of 694. The portion of the city in Faulkner County is part of the Central Arkansas region.

== Geography ==
Quitman is located in southwestern Cleburne County and extends southwest along Arkansas Highway 25 into Faulkner County. Highway 25 leads 15 miles (24 km) northeast to Heber Springs, the Cleburne County seat, and southwest 14 miles (23 km) to U.S. Route 65 north of Greenbrier.

According to the United States Census Bureau, Quitman has a total area of 2.0 square miles (5.1 km^{2}), all land.

== Demographics ==
Historical population
Census	Pop.	Note	%±
1880	177		—
1890	327		84.7%
1900	383		17.1%
1910	471		23.0%
1920	366		−22.3%
1930	333		−9.0%
1940	393		18.0%
1950	345		−12.2%
1960	305		−11.6%
1970	354		16.1%
1980	556		57.1%
1990	632		13.7%
2000	714		13.0%
2010	762		6.7%
2020	694		−8.9%
2025 (est.)	704	▲	1.4%
U.S. Decennial Census

=== 2020 census ===
Quitman racial composition
Race	Number	Percentage
White (non-Hispanic)	634	91.35%
Black or African American (non-Hispanic)	4	0.58%
Native American	4	0.58%
Asian	1	0.14%
Other/Mixed	37	5.33%
Hispanic or Latino	14	2.02%

As of the 2020 United States census, there were 694 people, 311 households, and 218 families residing in the city.

=== 2000 census ===
At the 2000 census there were 714 people in 316 households, including 204 families, in the city. The population density was 378.2 inhabitants per square mile (146.0/km^{2}). There were 358 housing units at an average density of 189.6 per square mile (73.2/km^{2}). The racial makeup of the city was 98.88% White, 1.04% Native American, 0.14% Asian, and 0.84% from two or more races. 0.42% of the population were Hispanic or Latino of any race. Of the 316 households 31.3% had children under the age of 18 living with them, 50.6% were married couples living together, 9.8% had a female householder with no husband present, and 35.4% were non-families. 32.6% of households were one person and 20.6% were one person aged 65 or older. The average household size was 2.26 and the average family size was 2.84.

The age distribution was 25.6% under the age of 18, 8.3% from 18 to 24, 26.3% from 25 to 44, 17.9% from 45 to 64, and 21.8% 65 or older. The median age was 38 years. For every 100 females, there were 85.0 males. For every 100 females age 18 and over, there were 80.6 males.

The median household income was $24,375 and the median family income was $31,964. Males had a median income of $28,750 versus $18,047 for females. The per capita income for the city was $15,537. About 11.8% of families and 14.0% of the population were below the poverty line, including 12.2% of those under age 18 and 23.2% of those age 65 or over.

== Education ==
Public education of elementary and secondary school students is available from Quitman School District leading to graduation from Quitman High School.
