= Arkansas Highway 247 =

Highway in Arkansas

Highway 247

Route information
- Maintained by ArDOT

Location
- Country: United States
- State: Arkansas
- Counties: Pope, Conway, Perry

Highway system
- Arkansas Highway System; Interstate; US; State; Business; Spurs; Suffixed; Scenic; Heritage
← AR 246	→ AR 248

Highway 247 (AR 247, Ark. 247, and Hwy. 247) is a designation for four north–south state highways in the Arkansas River Valley. Two are low traffic, two-lane, rural connector highways serving sparsely populated areas of the River Valley. A third segment is a four-lane highway bypassing Pottsville. A fourth segment mostly runs as Poor Farm Road in Morrilton among several educational buildings in the city. The first rural segment was created in 1957, with the Morrilton segment created in 1965 and a second rural segment in 1966. The final designation came in 1973. All segments are maintained by the Arkansas Department of Transportation (ArDOT).

== Russellville to Pottsville ==
Highway 247
- Location: Pope County, Arkansas
- Length: 7.73 mi (12.44 km)
- Existed: November 23, 1966–present

Highway 247 (AR 247, Ark. 247, and Hwy. 247) is a north–south state highway in southern Pope County. The highway connects Pottsville and I-40 to southern Russellville along the Arkansas Valley Plains. The route is a former alignment of the Butterfield Overland Mail, a predecessor of the Pony Express running from Memphis, Tennessee to California in the 1850s.

=== Route description ===
Highway 247 begins at Highway 7 (Arkansas Avenue) in southern Russellville just east of Whig Creek, and less than one mile (1.6 km) from the Arkansas River. The highway runs east along the southern city limits of Russellville through a largely vacant industrial area, shortly passing through unincorporated area before entering Pottsville. Though within city limits, Highway 247 continues due east through mostly undeveloped terrain, crossing the Tanyard Branch and Galla Creek before turning north. Highway 247 passes over the Union Pacific Railway tracks just before an intersection with US Highway 64 (US 64) and Highway 363 (Crow Mountain Drive) just south of Interstate 40 (I-40).

The ArDOT maintains Highway 247 like all other parts of the state highway system. As a part of these responsibilities, the Department tracks the volume of traffic using its roads in surveys using a metric called average annual daily traffic (AADT). ArDOT estimates the traffic level for a segment of roadway for any average day of the year in these surveys. As of 2017, estimates in Russellville were 6,900 vehicles per day (VPD), with 4,700 VPD near the northern terminus in Pottsville. This segment of Highway 247 is part of the National Highway System (NHS), a network of roads important to the nation's economy, defense, and mobility.

=== History ===
The Arkansas State Highway Commission created a segment of Highway 247 along a county road between Highway 7 in North Dardanelle and US 64 in Pottsville on November 23, 1966. Following construction of a $34.7 million ($50 million today) widening and extension project known colloquially as the Pottsville Bypass, Highway 247 was rerouted in 2013. The Pottsville City Council voted to name the highway the Butterfield Stagecoach Bypass in 2011.

=== Major intersections ===
The entire route is in Pope County.

Location	mi	km	Destinations	Notes
Russellville	0.00	0.00	AR 7 (Arkansas Avenue) – Dardanelle, Russellville	Southern terminus
Pottsville	7.73	12.44	I-40 / US 64 / AR 363 north – Pottsville, Atkins	Northern terminus; southern terminus of AR 363; exit 88 on I-40
1.000 mi = 1.609 km; 1.000 km = 0.621 mi

== Atkins to Hattieville ==
Highway 247
- Location: Pope and Conway counties
- Length: 10.165 mi (16.359 km)
- Existed: July 10, 1957–present

Highway 247 (AR 247, Ark. 247, and Hwy. 247) is a north–south state highway in the Arkansas Valley Plains.

=== Route description ===
Highway 247 begins at Highway 105 north of Atkins. The highways runs eastward through a sparsely populated rural area, passing through the unincorporated community of Economy before crossing Point Remove Creek and entering Conway County. Highway 247 turns southeastward, intersecting three county roads that lead to the Ed Gordon Point Remove Wildlife Management Area. The highway terminates at an intersection with Highway 213.

Highway 247 had a peak AADT of 1,200 VPD near the Highway 105 intersection, dropping as low as 350 VPD near the Pope-Conway county line. The segment is not listed on the NHS.

=== History ===
The Highway Commission created Highway 247 from Highway 105 near Atkins north to Economy on July 10, 1957 during a period of expansion in the state highway system. The Arkansas General Assembly passed the Act 148 of 1957, the Milum Road Act, creating 10–12 miles (16–19 km) of new state highways in each county. It was extended east to Hattieville on June 23, 1965.

=== Major intersections ===
County	Location	mi	km	Destinations	Notes
Pope		0.000	0.000	AR 105 – Atkins, Hector	Southern terminus
Pope		5.652	9.096	Bridge over Point Remove Creek	
Conway		10.165	16.359	AR 213 – Hattieville, Morrilton, Old Hickory	Northern terminus
1.000 mi = 1.609 km; 1.000 km = 0.621 mi

== Morrilton ==
Highway 247
- Location: Morrilton
- Length: 1.726 mi (2.778 km)
- Existed: June 23, 1965–present

Highway 247 (AR 247, Ark. 247, and Hwy. 247) is a north–south state highway mostly in Morrilton.

=== Route description ===
Highway 247 begins in Morrilton, a small city in the Arkansas River Valley along I-40. Starting at an intersection with Highway 9 Spur in the north part of Morrilton, Highway 247 runs due north as a section line road named Poor Farm Road past Morrilton High School and Morrilton Junior High School. Highway 247 has a junction with Highway 132 (University Boulevard) just west of the University of Arkansas Community College at Morrilton campus. Continuing due north, Highway 247 passes the Morrilton Intermediate School before crossing over I-40 with an overpass (no access). Now outside the Morrilton city limits, Highway 247 serves a rural area, passing the River Valley Technical Center before an intersection with Highway 95, where it terminates.

Highway 247 had a peak AADT of 3,100 VPD near Morrilton High School, dropping to 2,400 north of I-40. The segment is not listed on the NHS.

=== History ===
The Highway Commission created Highway 247 on June 23, 1965.

=== Major intersections ===
The entire route is in Conway County.

Location	mi	km	Destinations	Notes
Morrilton	0.000	0.000	AR 9S (Harding Street)	Southern terminus
Morrilton			AR 132 (University Boulevard)	
	1.726	2.778	AR 95 – Morrilton, Saint Vincent	Northern terminus
1.000 mi = 1.609 km; 1.000 km = 0.621 mi

== Petit Jean State Park ==
Highway 247
- Location: Petit Jean State Park vicinity
- Length: 4.515 mi (7.266 km)
- Existed: March 28, 1973–present

Highway 247 (AR 247, Ark. 247, and Hwy. 247) is a short north–south state highway connecting two highways near Casa in the vicinity of Petit Jean State Park.

=== Route description ===
Highway 247 begins at Highway 155 in Perry County approximately 2 miles (3.2 km) north of Casa in a steep section of the typically flat Arkansas River Valley. The rural, two-lane highway ascends Cove Mountain and enters Conway County. Highway 247 continues northward to Pontoon, where it terminates at an intersection with Highway 154 near the Petit Jean River and the Yell County line.

Highway 247 had an AADT of 180 VPD in 2018. For reference, the American Association of State Highway and Transportation Officials (AASHTO) classifies roads with fewer than 400 vehicles per day as a very low volume local road. The segment is not listed on the NHS.

=== History ===
A fourth segment of Highway 247 was created along an existing county road between Pontoon and the Conway-Perry county line on March 28, 1973, during a period of highway system expansion after Act 9 of 1973 was passed by the Arkansas General Assembly. The act directed county judges and legislators to designate up to 12 miles (19 km) of county roads as state highways in each county. Two months later, it was extended south to the current southern terminus.

=== Major intersections ===
County	Location	mi	km	Destinations	Notes
Perry		0.000	0.000	AR 155	Southern terminus
Conway	Pontoon	4.515	7.266	AR 154 – Oppelo, Centerville	Northern terminus
1.000 mi = 1.609 km; 1.000 km = 0.621 mi

== See also ==
- List of Arkansas state highways
