= South Conway County School District =

School district in Arkansas, United States

Location
- 704 East Church Street; Morrilton, Arkansas 72110 United States

District information
- Grades: PK–12
- Superintendent: Shawn Halbrook
- Accreditation: Arkansas Department of Education
- Schools: 6
- NCES District ID: 0512520

Students and staff
- Students: 2,386 (2021-2022)
- Teachers: 203.52 (on FTE)(2021-2022)
- Staff: 147 (on FTE)(2021-2022)
- Student–teacher ratio: 11.72 (2021-2022)
- District mascot: Devil Dog
- Colors: Maroon; Gray

Other information
- Website: www.sccsd.org

South Conway County School District is a public school district in southern Conway County, Arkansas with its headquarters in Morrilton, the county seat.

The district encompasses 263.06 square miles (681.3 km^{2}) of land in Conway County, and serves the municipalities of Morrilton, Menifee, Oppelo, and Plumerville. It also serves the unincorporated areas of Solgohachia, and Springfield.

== History ==
In 1980 the East Side, Morrilton, and Plumerville School districts consolidated to form the new South Conway County district.

In 1974 the Conway County School District dissolved, with the Morrilton school district receiving a portion of it.

== Schools ==
=== Secondary education ===
- Morrilton High School, serving grades 9 through 12.
- Morrilton Junior High School, serving grades 7 through 9.
- River Valley Technical Center, serving grades 10 through 12.

==== River Valley Technical Center ====
River Valley Technical Center is a secondary area technical center designed to allow young people to receive skill training while they are still in high school. The Center serves students in the 10th, 11th and 12th grades from Morrilton, Nemo Vista, Perryville, and Wonderview High Schools

Students receive credit to be applied to their graduation requirements by their home school, and may also earn college credit at University of Arkansas Community College at Morrilton or Arkansas State University-Beebe. There is no cost to the student. Tuition is paid by the student's home school.

The Center offers the following programs:

- Automotive Collision Repair
- Automotive Service Technology
- Construction Technology
- Cosmetology
- Drafting & Design
- Medical Professions Education
- Petroleum Technology

=== Early childhood and elementary education ===
- Morrilton Intermediate School, serving grades 4 through 6.
- Morrilton Elementary School, serving grades 2 and 3.
- Morrilton Primary School, serving prekindergarten through grade 2.
