= Arkansas Highway 124 =

Highway in Arkansas

Highway 124

Route information
- Maintained by AHTD
- Existed: 1927–present

Section 1
- Length: 72.17 mi (116.15 km)
- West end: US 64 – Russellville
- East end: AR 36 – Rose Bud

Section 2
- Length: 9.17 mi (14.76 km)
- West end: AR 110 – Pangburn
- East end: AR 157 – Sunnydale

Location
- Country: United States
- State: Arkansas

Highway system
- Arkansas Highway System; Interstate; US; State; Business; Spurs; Suffixed; Scenic; Heritage
← AR 123	→ AR 125

Arkansas Highway 124 is a designation for two state highways in Central Arkansas. The western segment of 72.17 miles (116.15 km) runs from Russellville to Rose Bud. An eastern segment of 9.17 miles (14.76 km) runs east in White County from Pangburn to Highway 157.

== Route description ==
=== Russellville to Rose Bud ===
The route begins at U.S. Route 64 (US 64) in Russellville and runs north to Interstate 40 (I-40). It continues east to intersect Highway 164 in Moreland and Highway 105 in Caglesville before entering Conway County. AR 124 winds east and then south in Conway County before forming a concurrency with Highway 95. The highway runs east to concur with Highway 9 in Center Ridge, becoming Highway 92/Highway 124 until Springfield. Highway 124 briefly enters Faulkner County, where it intersects and concurs with US 65 for 2.2 miles (3.5 km). Highway 124 enters Cleburne County and has many intersections in Quitman, including Highway 25. The highway continues east into White County to Highway 36 in Rose Bud, where it terminates. This route is entirely two-lane, and has an officially designated exception of 0.66 miles (1.06 km) over Highway 25 in Cleburne County.

=== Pangburn to Sunnydale ===
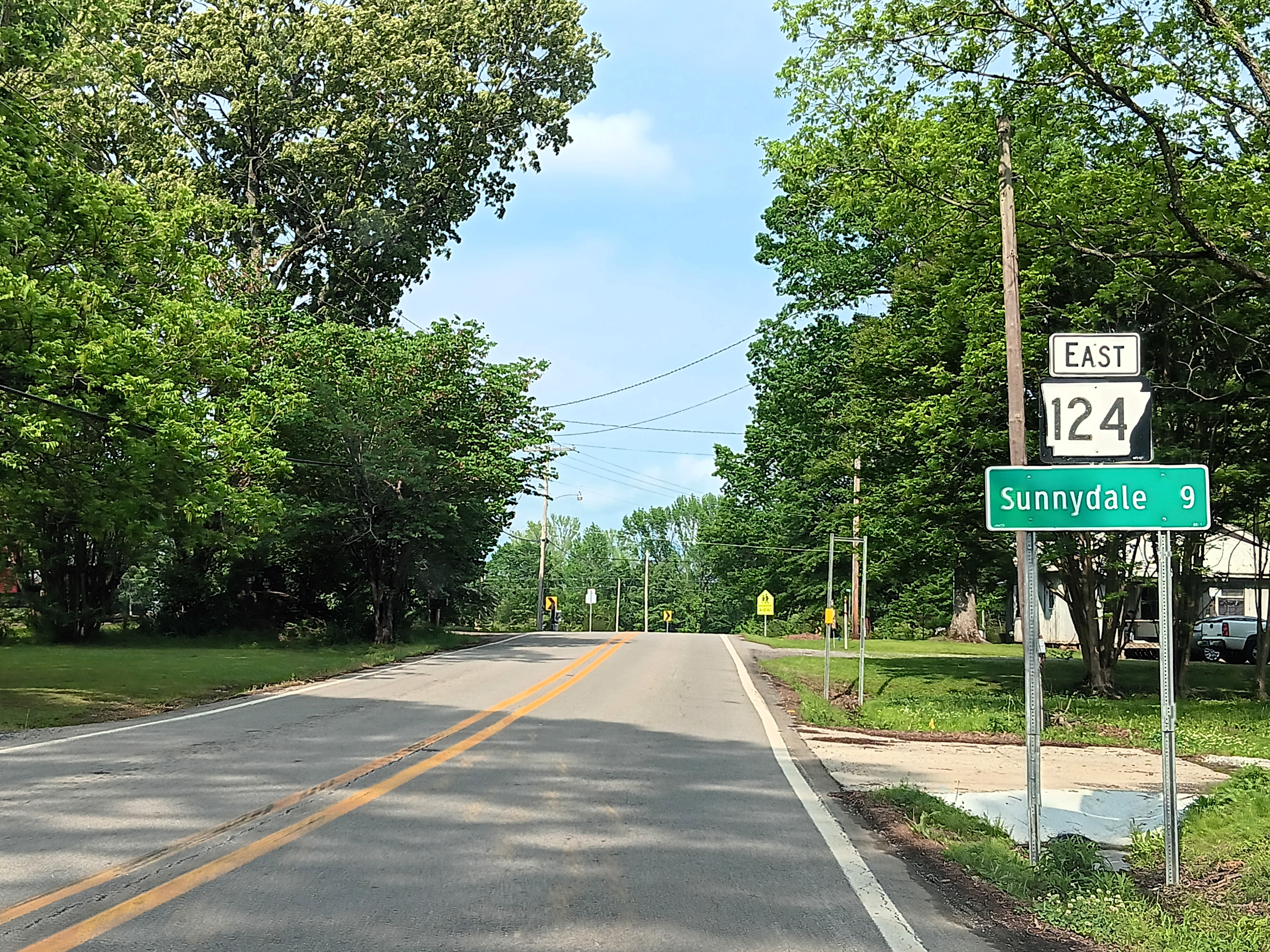
First reassurance marker for Arkansas Highway 124 east of the Highway 110 junction in Pangburn, Arkansas

Highway 124 begins at Highway 110 in Pangburn and runs east. The highway intersects Highway 305, and a short concurrency forms. The highway runs further east to intersect Highway 157 in Sunnydale, where it terminates. It is entirely two-lane and undivided.

== History ==
The route was added to the state highway system in 1927, a year after Arkansas first numbered its highways. The route ran from Russellville to Caglesville and was an unimproved road. The following year, Highway 124 was extended to Highway 95 in Conway County. At this time, Highway 124 from Russellville to Caglesville was graded, but the extension was not. In 1933, the route was shortened, running only from Russellville to Appleton (entirely in Pope County). By 1926, the unimproved segment from Appleton to AR 95 was again added to AR 124. The routing remained unchanged until 1953, when the route was extended along its modern alignment.

Formerly, Highway 124 had its western terminus at the intersection of Highway 7 and O Street in Russellville. The highway passed over I-40 without an interchange before meeting its current alignment east of town. When Highway 124 was widened northeast of Russellville, it was realigned onto Weir Road, formerly a stretch of Highway 326.

== Major intersections ==
Mile markers reset at concurrencies.

County	Location	mi	km	Destinations	Notes
Pope	Russellville	0.00	0.00	US 64 (East Main Street)	Western terminus
Pope	Russellville	0.85	1.37	I-40 – Fort Smith, Little Rock, Morrilton, Clarksville	I-40 exit 83
Pope	Gum Log	6.7	10.8	AR 326 east	AR 326 western terminus
Pope	Moreland	10.2	16.4	AR 164 – Dover, Oak Grove	
Pope	Caglesville	13.8	22.2	AR 105 south – Atkins	AR 105 concurrency begins
Pope	Caglesville	0.8 miles (1.3 km) AR 105 concurrency north			
Pope		0.0	0.0	AR 105 north – Hector	AR 105 concurrency ends
Conway		15.0	24.1	AR 213 south – Old Hickory, Hattieville	AR 213 northern terminus
Conway	Wonderview	17.5	28.2	AR 95 south – Morrilton	AR 95 concurrency begins
Conway	6.3 miles (10.1 km) AR 95 concurrency north				
Conway	Mt. Zion	0.0	0.0	AR 95 north – Clinton	AR 95 concurrency ends
Conway	Center Ridge	11.0	17.7	AR 9 / AR 92 north – Clinton, Bee Branch	AR 9/AR 92 concurrency begins
Conway	Birdtown	7.5 miles (12.1 km) AR 9/AR 92 concurrency south			
Conway	Springfield	0.0	0.0	AR 92 south – Plumerville	AR 92 concurrency ends
Faulkner		8.0	12.9	AR 285 south – Wooster	AR 285 northern terminus
Faulkner	Damascus	12.0	19.3	US 65 south – Greenbrier	US 65 concurrency begins
Faulkner	Damascus	2.2 miles (3.5 km) US 65 concurrency north			
Van Buren		0.0	0.0	US 65 north – Clinton	US 65 concurrency ends
Cleburne	Quitman	9.7	15.6	AR 25 south (Heber Springs Rd) – Greenbrier, Conway	AR 25 concurrency begins
Cleburne	Quitman	10.1	16.3	AR 356 north (Bee Branch Rd)	AR 356 southern terminus
Cleburne	Quitman	10.3	16.6	AR 25 north (Heber Springs Rd)	AR 25 concurrency ends
Cleburne	Quitman	15.2	24.5	AR 107 north	AR 107 southern terminus
White	Rose Bud	18.4	29.6	AR 36 north	Eastern terminus of western section
White	Gap in route				
White	Pangburn	0.0	0.0	AR 110 (Arkansas Ave)	Western terminus of eastern section
White	Dewey	5.1	8.2	AR 305 south	AR 305 concurrency begins
White	Little Red	6.5	10.5	AR 305 north	AR 305 concurrency ends
White	Sunnydale	8.8	14.2	AR 157	Eastern terminus
1.000 mi = 1.609 km; 1.000 km = 0.621 mi: Concurrency terminus

== See also ==
- List of state highways in Arkansas
