= Arkansas Highway 155 =

State highway in Arkansas, United States

Highway 155

Route information
- Maintained by ArDOT

Section 1
- Length: 7.10 mi (11.43 km)
- West end: Mount Nebo State Park
- East end: AR 22, Dardanelle

Section 2
- Length: 7.56 mi (12.17 km)
- North end: AR 7 north of Datto
- South end: AR 154, Missouri state line

Section 3
- Length: 11.16 mi (17.96 km)
- South end: AR 10 near Casa
- North end: AR 154, Petit Jean State Park

Section 4
- Length: 2.68 mi (4.31 km)
- North end: AR 60
- South end: CR 14

Location
- Country: United States
- State: Arkansas
- Counties: Conway, Perry, Yell

Highway system
- Arkansas Highway System; Interstate; US; State; Business; Spurs; Suffixed; Scenic; Heritage
| ← AR 154 | → AR 156 |

Arkansas Highway 155 (AR 155 and Hwy. 155) is a designation for four state highways in Arkansas. The northernmost segment of 7.10 miles (11.43 km) runs from Mount Nebo State Park to AR 22 in Dardanelle. A second segment in Yell County of 7.56 miles (12.17 km) connects Highway 7 and Highway 154. A third segment runs 11.16 miles (17.96 km) from AR 10 near Casa to Petit Jean State Park. The fourth segment is a 2.68-mile (4.31 km) spur from Highway 60 south to an area near Deberrie.

== Route description ==
=== Mount Nebo State Park to Dardanelle ===
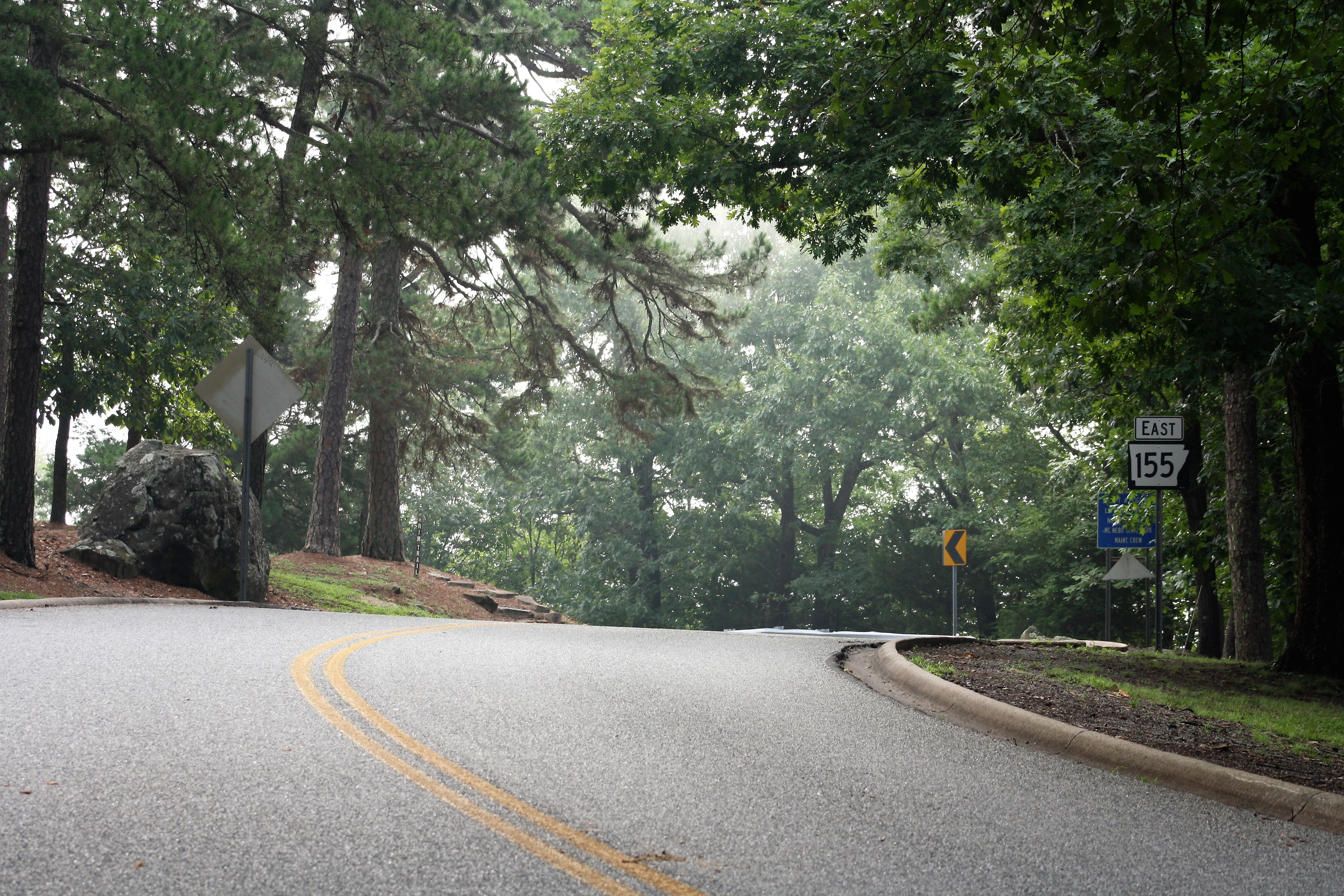
Highway 155 in Mount Nebo State Park

The route begins at Sunset Point on the north rim of Mount Nebo, in its respective state park, Mount Nebo State Park. It is surrounded by a dense forest while on the mountain and passes near the historic Mt. Nebo State Park Pavilion, the visitor center, and other points of interest in the park. Highway 155 winds down the mountain on eleven hairpin curves with very steep grades, as much as 18% in places. There are no alternative routes, as Route 155 is the only road up or down the mountain. As a result, the route is a popular destination for motorcycle riders, and trailers and RVs over 24 feet are prohibited in the state park. It eventually points due east toward Dardanelle. The route intersects with Highway 22 in the city and terminates.

=== Old Neely ===
The route begins at Arkansas Highway 7 and runs east and south (Note: Although highways in the United States run from south to north and west to east, the Arkansas State Highway and Transportation Department lists Highway 155, Section 2 beginning at AR 7 and running south to AR 154.) through Old Neely to Arkansas Highway 154 in a right-angle manner. The route does not cross or concur with any other state highways. The route essentially serves as giving Old Neely access to the state highway system.

=== Casa to Petit Jean State Park ===
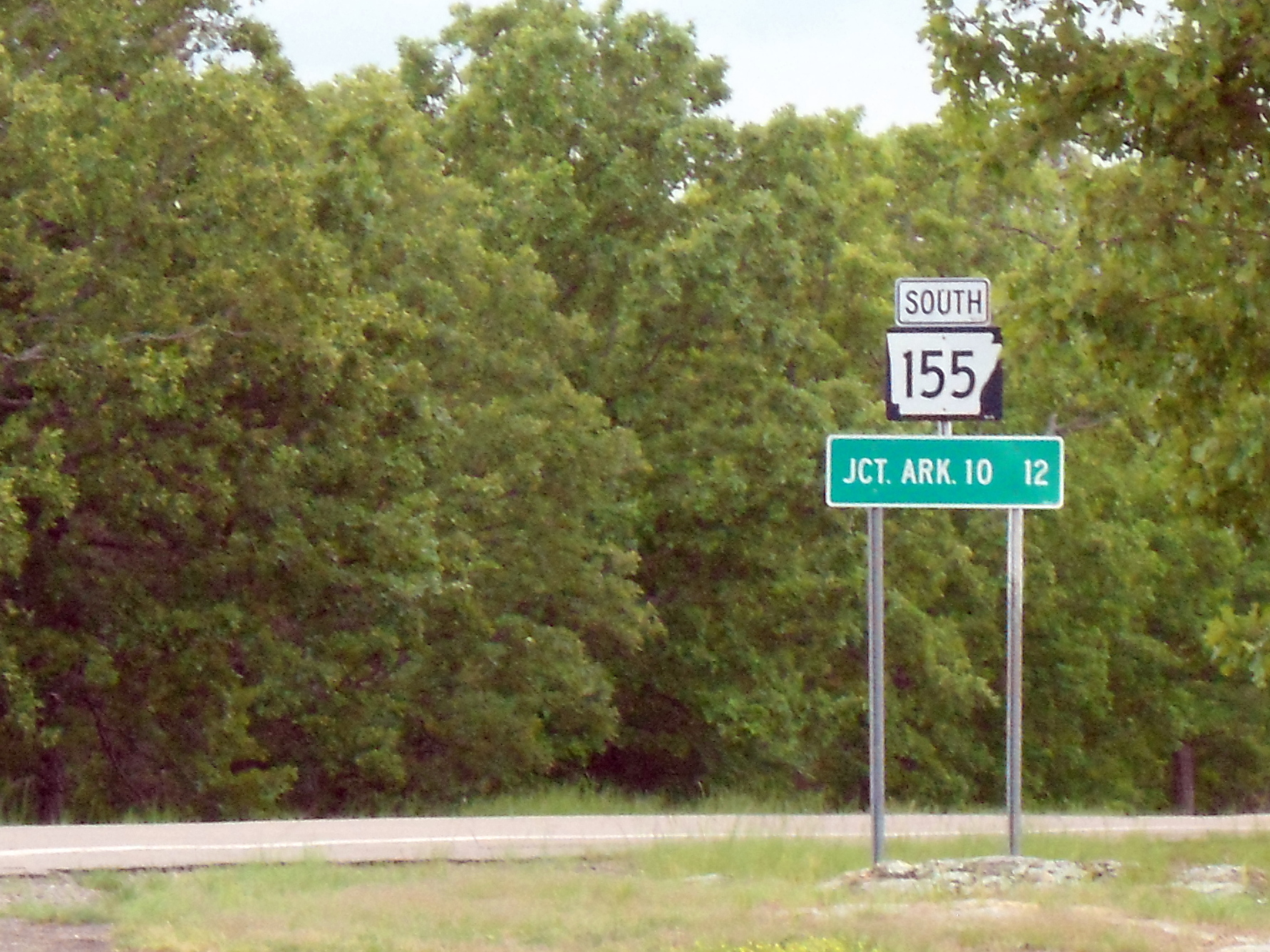
Highway 155 runs south from Petit Jean State Park

The route begins at Arkansas Highway 10 just east of Casa and runs north to serve as a terminus for Highway 247 and Highway 324. AR 155 continues to wind through forests before terminating at Highway 154 in Petit Jean State Park near the historic Seven Hollows Site.

=== Highway 60 to Perry CR 14 ===
Arkansas Highway 155 is a brief spur route that begins at Arkansas Highway 60. The route runs due south (Note: Although highways in the United States run from south to north and west to east, the Arkansas State Highway and Transportation Department lists Highway 155, Section 6 beginning at AR 60 and running south.) to terminate near Deberrie, which is an unincorporated community.

== Major intersections ==
| County | Location | mi | km | Destinations | Notes |
|---|---|---|---|---|---|
| Yell | | 0.00 | 0.00 | Mount Nebo State Park | western terminus |
| Yell | Dardanelle | 7.10 | 11.43 | AR 22 – Paris, Dardanelle, Ola | eastern terminus |
| Yell | Gap in route | | | | |
| Yell | | 0.00 | 0.00 | AR 7 – Ola, Dardanelle | northern terminus |
| Yell | | 7.56 | 12.17 | AR 154 | southern terminus |
| Yell | Gap in route | | | | |
| Perry | | 0.00 | 0.00 | AR 10 – Birta, Ola, Casa | southern terminus |
| Perry | | 4.70 | 7.56 | AR 247 north – Pontoon | |
| Perry | | 7.61 | 12.25 | AR 324 south – Adona | |
| Conway | Petit Jean State Park | 11.16 | 17.96 | AR 154 (Petit Jean Mountain Road) – Pontoon, Oppelo | northern terminus |
Gap in route
| Perry | Aplin | 0.00 | 0.00 | AR 60 – Nimrod, Fourche Junction | northern terminus |
| Perry | | 2.91 | 4.68 | CR 14 | southern terminus |
1.000 mi = 1.609 km; 1.000 km = 0.621 mi

== See also ==
- List of state highways in Arkansas
