= Wonderview School District =

School district in Arkansas, United States

Location
- 2436 Hwy 95; Hattieville, Arkansas 72063 United States

District information
- Schools: 2
- NCES District ID: 0514370

Students and staff
- Students: 470 (2021-2022)
- Teachers: 48.31 (on FTE basis)(2021-2022)
- Staff: 38 (on FTE basis)(2021-2022)
- Student–teacher ratio: 9.73

Other information
- Website: www.wonderviewschools.org

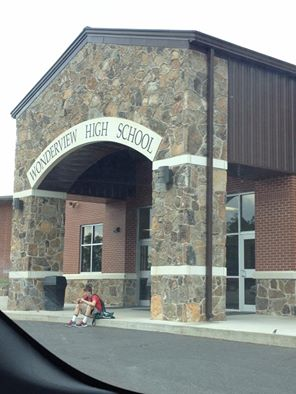
Wonderview High School

Wonderview School District is a public school district based in Conway County, Arkansas. It is located in an unincorporated area, and has a Hattieville postal address.

It includes the communities of Wonderview, Cleveland, Jerusalem, and Hattieville.

In 1974 the Conway County School District dissolved, with the Wonderview district receiving a portion of it.

== Schools ==
- Wonderview High School
- Wonderview Elementary School
