= Arkansas Highway 95 =

State highway in Arkansas, United States

Highway 95

Route information
- Maintained by ArDOT
- Length: 49.40 mi (79.50 km)

Major junctions
- South end: US 64 / AR 113 in Morrilton
- I-40 in Morrilton; US 65B in Clinton; US 65 in Clinton
- North end: AR 330

Location
- Country: United States
- State: Arkansas
- Counties: Conway, Van Buren

Highway system
- Arkansas Highway System; Interstate; US; State; Business; Spurs; Suffixed; Scenic; Heritage
← AR 94	→ AR 96

Highway 95 (AR 95, Ark. 95, and Hwy. 95) is a designation for a north–south state highway in north central Arkansas. The route runs 49.40 miles (79.50 km) runs north from US Highway 64 and Highway 113 in Morrilton north to Highway 330.

== Route description ==
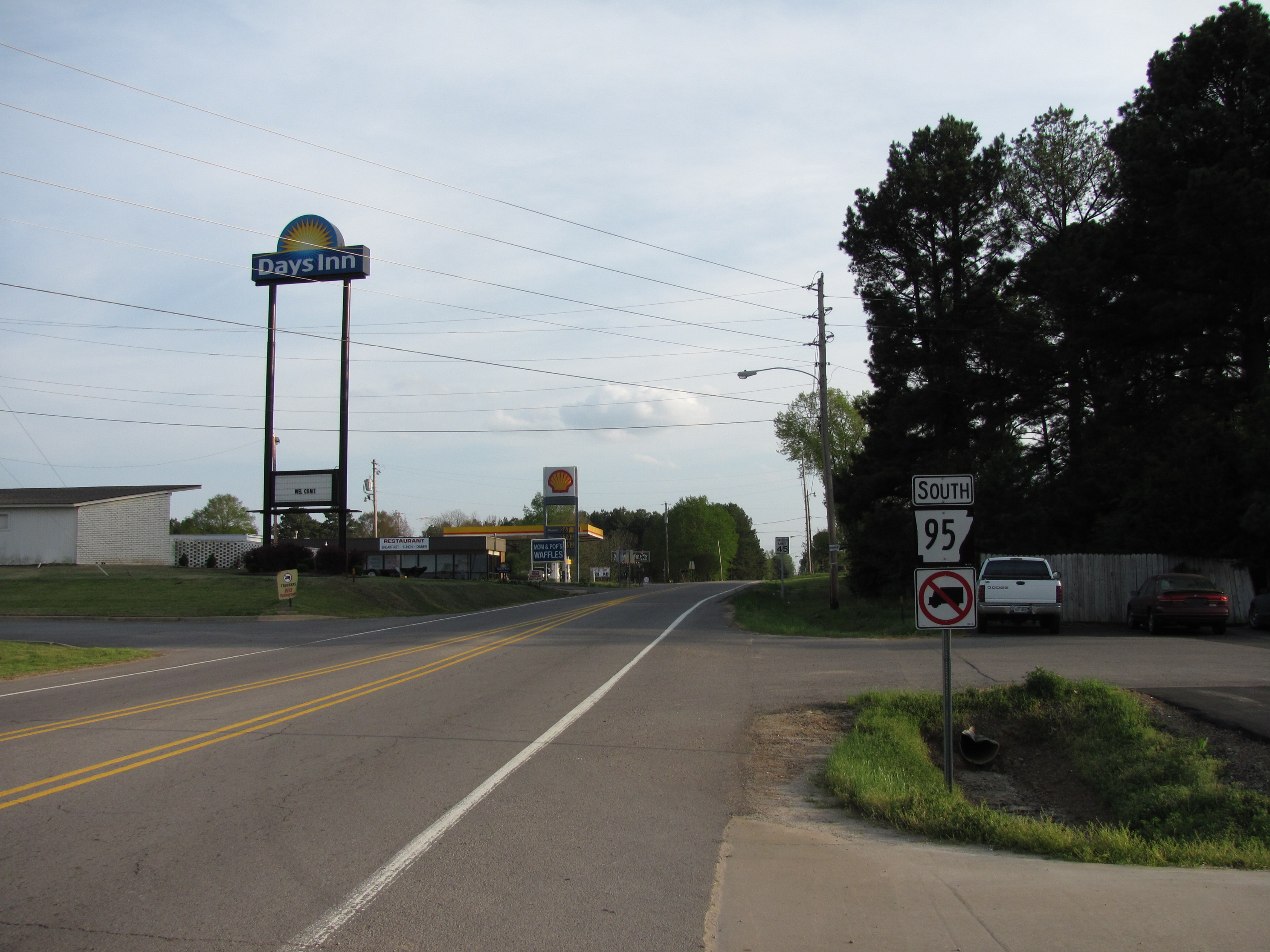
Southbound in Morrilton, Arkansas

Highway 95 begins in the Arkansas River Valley at US 64 and Highway 113 in Morrilton and runs north past the historic Morrilton Post Office, listed on National Register of Historic Places (NRHP). The route runs north through a residential area before intersections with Highway 132 and Highway 95 Spur (AR 95S). North of these junctions, the highway crosses Interstate 40 (I-40) at a full interchange before becoming a rural route and passing through unincorporated areas.

In central Conway County, the highway serves as the eastern terminus of Highway 213 before beginning a concurrency with Highway 124 at Wonderview. The overlapping routes serve as the northern terminus for Highway 287 before Highway 124 departs the route at Mt. Zion. The route runs north to the edge of the Ozark National Forest in Cleveland before turning northeast and entering Van Buren County after a few miles.

The highway passes through Beverage Town, Scotland and Walnut Grove before entering Clinton. In the city, Highway 95 begins an overlap with U.S. Route 65B (US 65B) heading south. The concurrent routes pass near the Van Buren County Courthouse and Walter Patterson Filling Station, both NRHP-listed properties. US 65B terminates at the parent route, and US 65/Highway 95 run south until Highway 95 splits from US 65 near the Ozark Health Medical Center. The route runs southeast to terminate at Highway 330 near Greers Ferry Lake.

== Major intersections ==
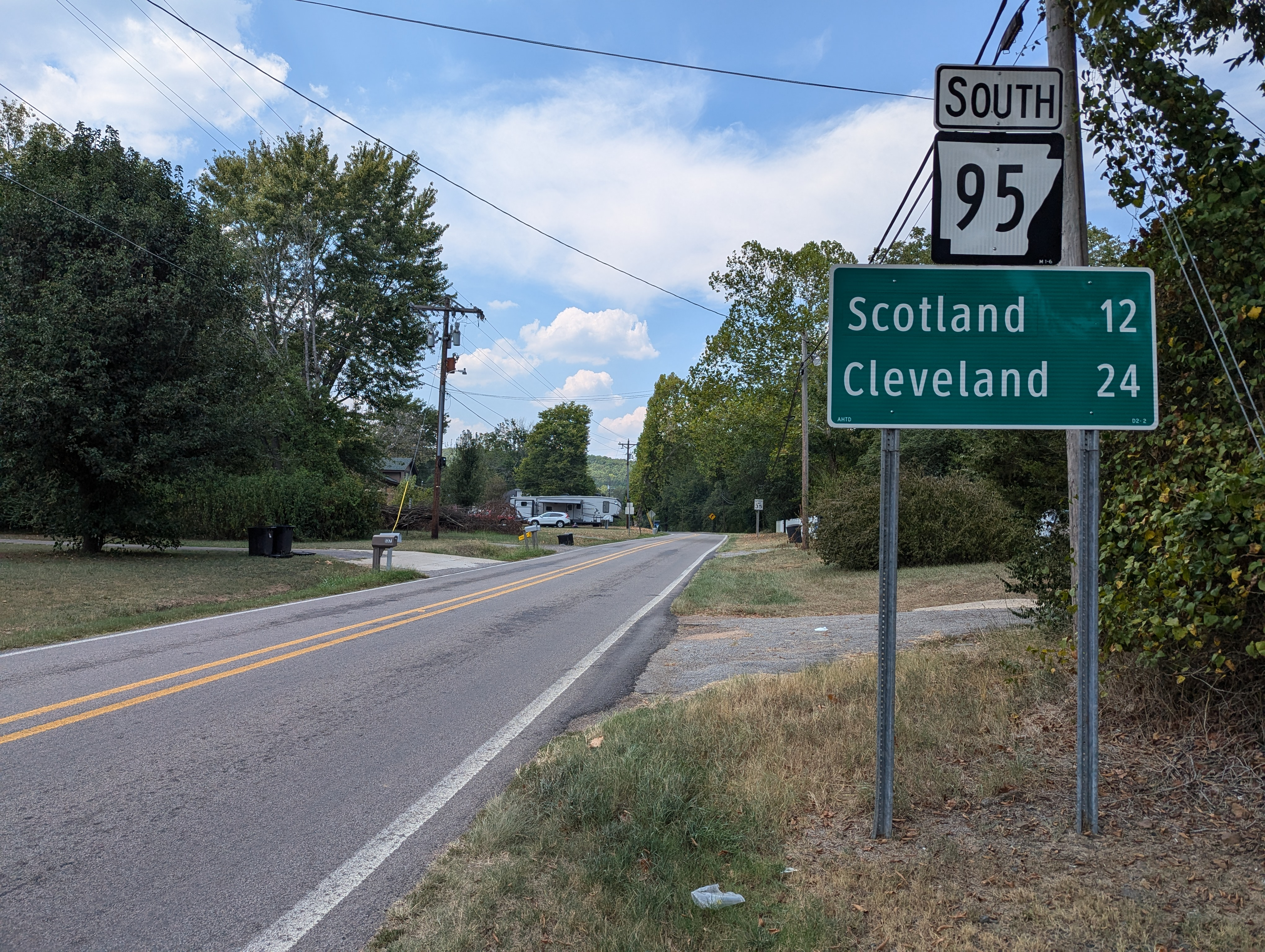
Highway 95 in Clinton, Arkansas looking south

County	Location	mi	km	Destinations	Notes
Conway	Morrilton	0.00	0.00	US 64 (Broadway Street) / AR 113 north (Division Street)	Southern terminus; AR 113 southern terminus
Conway	Morrilton	1.36	2.19	AR 132 east (University Blvd)	AR 132 western terminus
Conway	Morrilton	1.42	2.29	AR 95S west (Arrow Dr)	AR 95S eastern terminus
Conway	Morrilton	1.54	2.48	I-40 – Little Rock, Russellville	
Conway		2.68	4.31	AR 247 south (Poor Farm Rd)	AR 95S northern terminus
Conway		2.9	4.7	AR 915 east (Lakeview Rd)	AR 915 western terminus
Conway		8.14	13.10	AR 213 north – Hattieville	AR 213 southern terminus
Conway	Wonderview	12.88	20.73	AR 124 west – Jerusalem	Southern end of AR 124 concurrency
Conway	Blick	16.94	27.26	AR 287 south	AR 287 northern terminus
Conway	Mt. Zion	18.99	30.56	AR 124 east – Center Ridge	Northern end of AR 124 concurrency
Van Buren	Clinton	42.78	68.85	US 65B north	Northern end of US 65B concurrency
Van Buren	Clinton	43.33	69.73	US 65 north – Marshall, Harrison	Northern end of US 65 concurrency, US 65B southern terminus
Van Buren	Clinton	45.38	73.03	US 65 south – Conway	Southern end of US 65 concurrency
Van Buren		49.40	79.50	AR 330	Northern terminus
1.000 mi = 1.609 km; 1.000 km = 0.621 mi: Concurrency terminus

== Morrilton spur ==
Highway 95S
- Location: Morrilton
- Length: 0.32 mi (510 m)

Highway 95 Spur (AR 95S, Ark. 95S and Hwy. 95S) is a spur route in Morrilton. It is a short city street leading from the parent route to the Bosch (formerly Telex Communications) factory.

=== Major intersections ===
The entire route is in Morrilton, Conway County.

mi	km	Destinations	Notes
0.00	0.00	AR 95 (Oak St)	Eastern terminus
0.32	0.51	End state maintenance, Bosch parking lot	Western terminus
1.000 mi = 1.609 km; 1.000 km = 0.621 mi

== See also ==
- List of state highways in Arkansas
