= Pleasant Hill, Conway County, Arkansas =

Pleasant Hill, Arkansas
- Unincorporated community
- Location within Arkansas Location within the United States
- Coordinates: 35°23′06″N 92°35′14″W
- Country: United States
- State: Arkansas
- County: Conway
- Elevation: 653 ft (199 m)
- Time zone: UTC-6 (Central (CST))
  - Summer (DST): UTC-5 (CDT)
- Area code: 501
- GNIS feature ID: 57158

Pleasant Hill is an unincorporated community in Conway County, Arkansas, United States. Pleasant Hill is 1.5 miles (2.4 km) west-northwest of Center Ridge.
