= Arkansas Highway 132 =

State highway in Morrilton, Conway County, Arkansas

Highway 132
- University Blvd

Route information
- Maintained by ArDOT
- Length: 1.24 mi (2.00 km)
- Existed: May 14, 1997–present

Major junctions
- West end: AR 95 in Morrilton
- AR 247 in Morrilton
- East end: AR 9B in Morrilton

Location
- Country: United States
- State: Arkansas
- Counties: Conway

Highway system
- Arkansas Highway System; Interstate; US; State; Business; Spurs; Suffixed; Scenic; Heritage
← AR 131	→ AR 133

Highway 132 (AR 132, Ark. 132, Hwy. 132, and University Blvd) is an east–west state highway in Morrilton, Conway County, Arkansas. The highway runs 1.24 miles (2.00 km) from Highway 95 east to Highway 9 Business (Hwy. 9B). The route serves as a main arterial street in Morrilton, connecting two major north–south streets to the University of Arkansas Community College at Morrilton (UACCM).

== Route description ==
Highway 132 begins at Highway 95 in western Morrilton, near Interstate 40 (I-40). The route runs east to an intersection with Highway 247, known as Poor Farm Rd within Morrilton. After this intersection, Highway 132 passes along the southern edge of the University of Arkansas Community College at Morrilton (UACCM) campus before intersecting Highway 9B, where it terminates.

== History ==
The original Highway 132 was designated in 1928 from Business US 82 in Magnolia to the Louisiana border. This route became part of US 371 in 1994. The current Highway 132 in Morrilton was added to the state highway system at the request of the city's mayor in 1997. The segment was added as part of an exchange that transferred a former portion of Highway 9B from US Highway 64 (US 64) to Highway 9 to city maintenance.

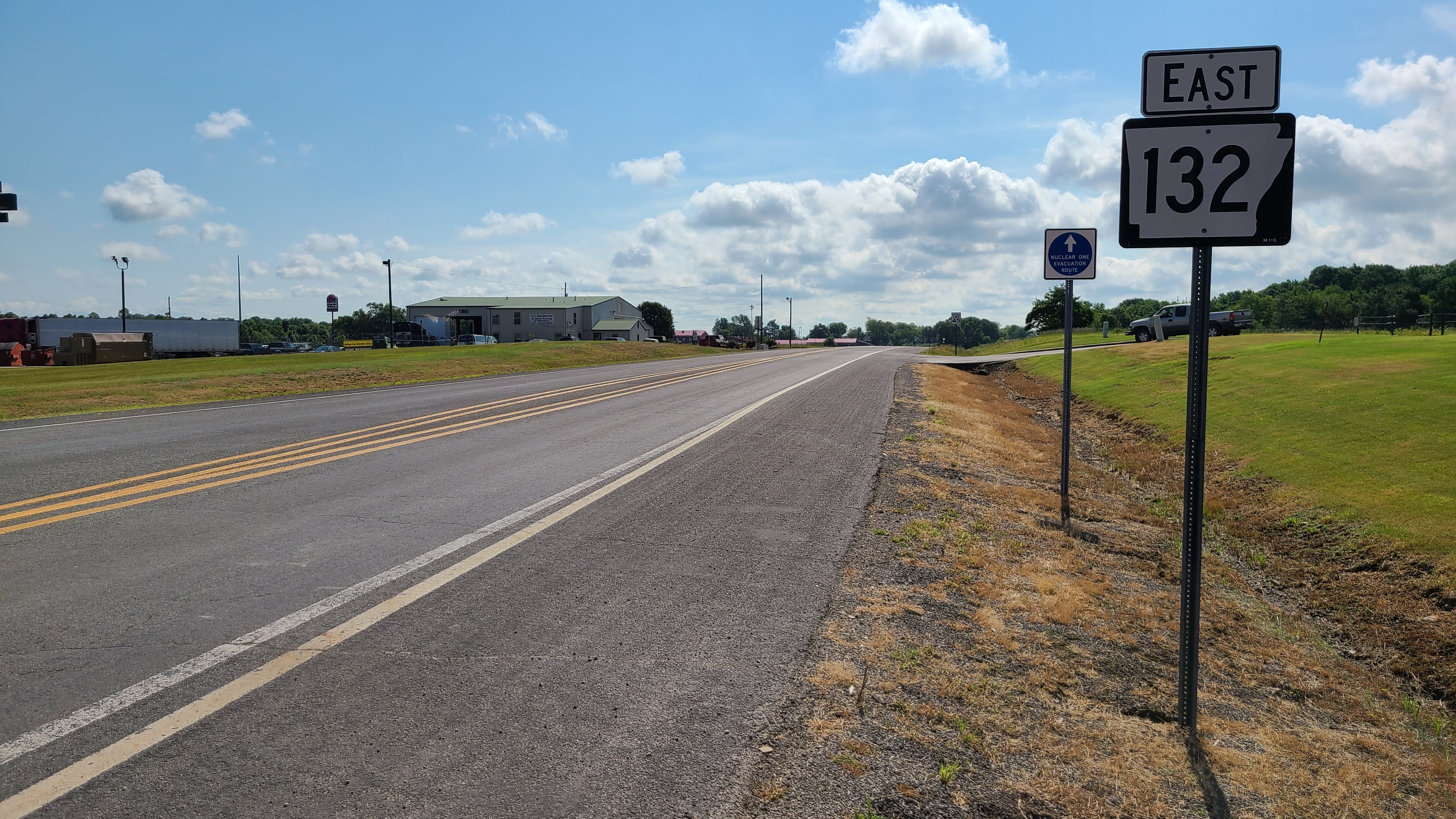
State Highway 132 in Morrilton, Arkansas, at its western terminus.

== Major intersections ==
The entire route is in Morrilton, Conway County.

mi	km	Destinations	Notes
0.00	0.00	AR 95 (North Oak Street)	Western terminus
0.49	0.79	AR 247 (Poor Farm Road)	
1.24	2.00	AR 9B (East Harding Street)	Eastern terminus
1.000 mi = 1.609 km; 1.000 km = 0.621 mi

== Former route ==
Highway 132
- Location: Magnolia to Louisiana state line
- Length: 25 mi (40 km)
- Existed: 1928–August 24, 1994

Highway 132 (AR 132, Ark. 132, and Hwy. 132) was a state highway of approximately 25 miles (40 km) in Columbia County. The route began at US 82 and ran south to the Louisiana state line. The route was created in 1928 and replaced by the US 371 designation in 1994.

Initially referenced as the Bi-State Corridor, the Arkansas State Highway Commission designated Highway 132 and several other highways as a proposed corridor to seek American Association of State Highway and Transportation Officials approval as a US Highway in January 1994. Upon receiving approval, the route was officially decommissioned in favor of US 371 on August 24, 1994.
