= Lewisburg, Arkansas =

Former town in Arkansas, United States

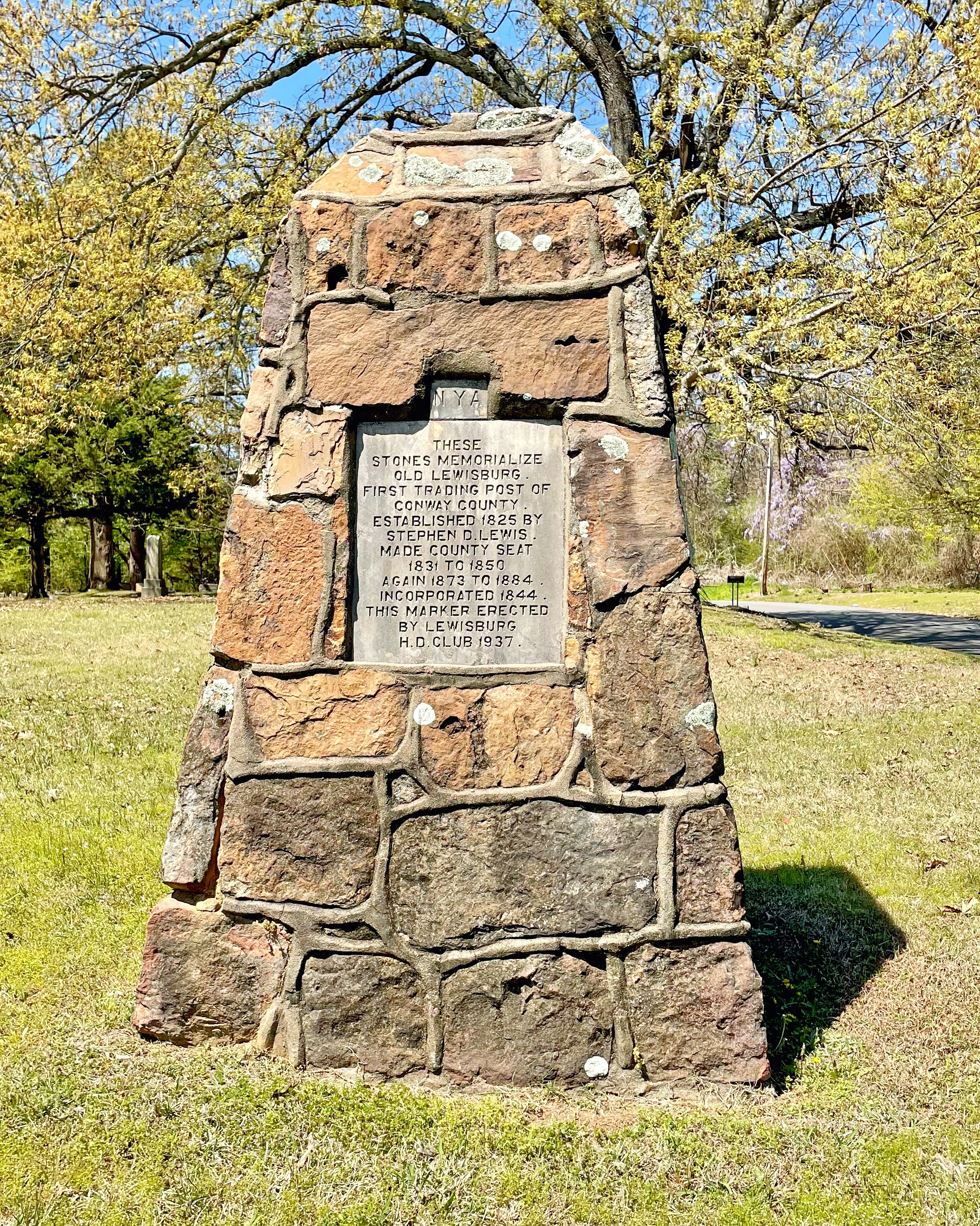
- Old Lewisburg Memorial

- Location within Arkansas
- 35°08′31″N 92°44′07″W
- Location: Conway County, Arkansas

History
- Founded: 1825 (201 years ago)

Lewisburg is a former town in and the first county seat of Conway County, Arkansas, United States. The area is a residential neighborhood of Morrilton which is located in the southeast part of the city.

== History ==
Founded as a Cherokee trading post in 1825 by Stephen D. Lewis, the town of Lewisburg served as the first county seat of Conway County from 1831 until 1883, when it was replaced by Morrilton.

While thriving as a town of nearly 2,000 residents along the Arkansas River up to the American Civil War, Lewisburg was the site of significant Federal troop movements between September 1863 and August 1865. Frequented by intermittent guerrilla warfare late in the American Civil War, repeated skirmishing between Arkansas militia and the Ku Klux Klan during Reconstruction led to conflagration of Lewisburg and the declaration of martial law under Governor Powell Clayton in December 1868.

Desirability of Lewisburg as a ferry crossing on the Arkansas River was superseded as years passed, first by the Little Rock and Fort Smith Railroad bypassing the town in 1875, and later with a bridge constructed in 1919 to carry vehicular traffic onward to Oppelo and other points south of the river.
