= Morrilton High School =

Location
- 701 East Harding Street; Morrilton, Arkansas 72110; United States; 35°9′53″N 92°44′5″W

Information
- Status: Open
- School district: South Conway County School District
- NCES District ID: 0512520
- Authority: Arkansas Department of Education (ADE)
- CEEB code: 041710
- NCES School ID: 051252001242
- Principal: Craig Pinion
- Grades: 9–12
- Enrollment: 719 (2023-2024)
- Student to teacher ratio: 7.14
- Education system: ADE Smart Core curriculum
- Colors: Maroon and gray
- Athletics conference: 5A West (2020–22)
- Mascot: Devil Dog
- Team name: Morrilton Devil Dogs
- Accreditation: ADE
- Feeder schools: Morrilton Junior High School
- Affiliation: Arkansas Activities Association
- Website: mhs.sccsd.org

Morrilton High School is a comprehensive public high school serving students in grades nine through twelve in Morrilton, Arkansas, United States. It is in Conway County and is the sole high school administered by the South Conway County School District.

The school serves the municipalities of Morrilton, Menifee, Oppelo, and Plumerville. It also serves the unincorporated areas of Solgohachia and Springfield.

== Academics ==
The assumed course of study follows the Smart Core curriculum developed the Arkansas Department of Education (ADE), which requires students to complete 22 credit units before graduation. Students engage in regular and career focus courses and exams and may select Advanced Placement (AP) coursework and exams that provide an opportunity to receive college credit.

== Extracurricular activities ==
The Morrilton High School mascot is the Devil Dog with school colors of maroon and gray. The Morrilton Devil Dogs participate in various interscholastic activities in the 5A West Conference administered by the Arkansas Activities Association.

The school athletic activities include baseball, basketball (boys/girls), competitive cheer, cross country (boys/girls), American football, golf (boys/girls), softball, tennis (boys/girls), and volleyball. The boys basketball team won state championships in 1972, 1973, 1978,and 1991 while the girls won state championships in 1939, 1970, 1978, 2003 and 2006. The Devil Dogs won state football championships in 1971, 1973 and 2013. Coached by Doyne Davis, the '71 team won the Class AA state championship with a perfect 13-0 record. Every year the football team also participates in the I-40 showdown against Russellville High School.

== Notable alumni ==
- Jacolby Criswell (2020) – College football quarterback
- Nathan Green Gordon (1930–31, Grade 9–10) — Politician, lawyer, and Medal of Honor-decorated naval aviator.
- Maurice Jeffers (1997) — Professional basketball player.
- Jimmy Oliver (1987) — Professional basketball player (1991–2007).
- Shekinna Stricklen (2008) — WNBA professional basketball player; 2-time Arkansas Gatorade Player of the Year.
- C. Vann Woodward (1926) — American historian; Pulitizer Prize and Jefferson Lecture series honoree.
