= Nemo Vista School District =

School district in Arkansas, United States

Location
- 5690 AR 9 Center Ridge, Arkansas 72027 United States
- Coordinates: 35°22′7″N 92°33′49″W

District information
- Type: Public (government funded)
- Grades: PK–12
- NCES District ID: 0510410

Students and staff
- Students: 533 (2021-2022)
- Teachers: 86.75 (on FTE basis)(2021-2022)
- Staff: 44.8 (on FTE basis) (2021-2022)
- Student–teacher ratio: 6.14 (2021-2022)
- District mascot: Redhawks
- Colors: Red; White

Other information
- Website: socs.nemo.k12.ar.us

The Nemo Vista School District is a public school district based in Center Ridge, Arkansas, United States. The school district encompasses 106.30 square miles (275.3 km^{2}) of land serving all or portions of the Conway County community of Center Ridge.

The Nemo Vista School District employs over more than 96 faculty and staff on a full time equivalent basis to provide educational programs for students ranging from prekindergarten through twelfth grade at its consolidated facility serving three schools that enroll more than 500 students. The Nemo Vista School District is a member of the Arch Ford Education Service Cooperative.

All schools in the district are accredited by the Arkansas Department of Education.

== History ==
In 1974 the Conway County School District dissolved, with the Nemo Vista district receiving a portion of it.

== Schools ==
- Nemo Vista High School: grades 9–12
- Nemo Vista Middle School: grades 6–8
- Nemo Vista Elementary School: grades PK–5
