= Arkansas Highway 213 =

Highway in Arkansas, United States

Highway 213
- AR 213 highlighted in red

Route information
- Maintained by ArDOT
- Length: 9.35 mi (15.05 km)
- Existed: July 10, 1957–present

Major junctions
- South end: AR 95
- North end: AR 124

Location
- Country: United States
- State: Arkansas
- Counties: Conway

Highway system
- Arkansas Highway System; Interstate; US; State; Business; Spurs; Suffixed; Scenic; Heritage
← AR 212	→ AR 214

Highway 213 (AR 213, Ark. 213, and Hwy. 213) is a state highway in Conway County, Arkansas. The highway 9.35 miles (15.05 km) runs north from Highway 95 to Highway 124.

== Route description ==
Highway 213 begins in western Conway County on Highway 95 north of Morrilton and south of the Ozark National Forest. The highway runs northwest to Hattieville where it serves as the southern terminus for Highway 247. Following this junction, the highway turns north, running to Old Hickory before terminating at Highway 124. No segment of the highway is listed on the National Highway System, a network of roads important to the country's economy, defense, and mobility.

== History ==
The highway was created by the Arkansas State Highway Commission on July 10, 1957. The route has not seen any changes in alignment since designation.

== Major intersections ==
The entire route is in Conway County.

Location	mi	km	Destinations	Notes
	0.00	0.00	AR 95 – Clinton, Morrilton	Southern terminus
Hattieville	4.50	7.24	AR 247 north – Atkins	AR 247 southern terminus
	9.35	15.05	AR 124 to AR 95 – Jerusalem	Northern terminus
1.000 mi = 1.609 km; 1.000 km = 0.621 mi
