= Wonderview High School =

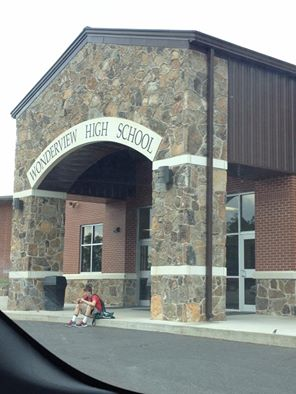
- The entrance to Wonderview High School in May 2013

Location
- 2436 AR 95; Hattieville, Arkansas 72063; United States; 35°19′38″N 92°43′48″W

Information
- School type: Comprehensive
- Established: 1934 (92 years ago)
- School district: Wonderview School District
- NCES District ID: 0514370
- CEEB code: 041045
- NCES School ID: 051437001170
- Principal: Jason Reynolds
- Teaching staff: 32.15
- Grades: 7–12
- Enrollment: 222 (2023–2024)
- Student to teacher ratio: 6.91
- Colors: Green and white
- Athletics: AAA 1A
- Athletics conference: 1A 5 North (2012–14)
- Team name: Wonderview Daredevils
- Newspaper: The Daily Flush
- Website: www.wonderviewschools.org

Wonderview High School is a comprehensive public high school in unincorporated Conway County, Arkansas, United States, with a Hattieville postal address. It is one of three public high schools located in Conway County and is the sole high school administered by Wonderview School District. Established in 1934, the school serves students in grades 7 through 12.

Its attendance zone includes the communities of Wonderview, Cleveland and Hattieville.

Wonderview High, whose mascot is the Daredevils, competes athletically in the smallest division of public schools in Arkansas, Class A. The school does not have a football team, due to its small class numbers.

== History ==
The school was established in 1934 by the first superintendent. The name "Wonderview" came from the marvelous view from the north side of the school. The words "wonderful view" was combined to make "Wonderview".

=== Campus ===
A gym, a few buildings, and the agricultural building were built in 1934, and the main high school building was built in 1943. In 1974, the cafeteria and an extension to the high school were built. In 1983, construction began on a new gym until 1985. In 1993, the old high school building was torn down, and a new one was built. In the 1990s, a new agricultural building was built, and the old agri building became a bus garage. In 2010, a new cafeteria and tornado shelter were also built.

== Athletics ==
The Wonderview mascot is the Daredevil with green and white serving as its school colors. The mascot is personified by Danny the Daredevil, who engages the crowd at sporting events. No other high school in the United States has the mascot Daredevil.

The Wonderview Daredevils compete in the state's smallest classification—Class A, administered by the Arkansas Activities Association. Wonderview competes in the 1A Region 5 North Conference. The Daredevils provide teams in basketball (boys/girls), baseball, softball, bowling (boys/girls) and track and field (boys/girls).

The Wonderview boys' basketball team has won one Class A state championship: 2010. The Wonderview girls' basketball team has won three Class A state championships: 2012, 2018, and 2019.

== Notable people ==
- Matt Zimmerman (1985)—Basketball coach, sports radio commentator
