= Arkansas Highway 154 =

State highway in Arkansas, United States

Highway 154

Route information
- Maintained by ArDOT
- Length: 41.00 mi (65.98 km)

Major junctions
- West end: AR 27 near Danville
- East end: AR 113 near Oppelo

Location
- Country: United States
- State: Arkansas
- Counties: Yell, Conway

Highway system
- Arkansas Highway System; Interstate; US; State; Business; Spurs; Suffixed; Scenic; Heritage
← AR 153	→ AR 155

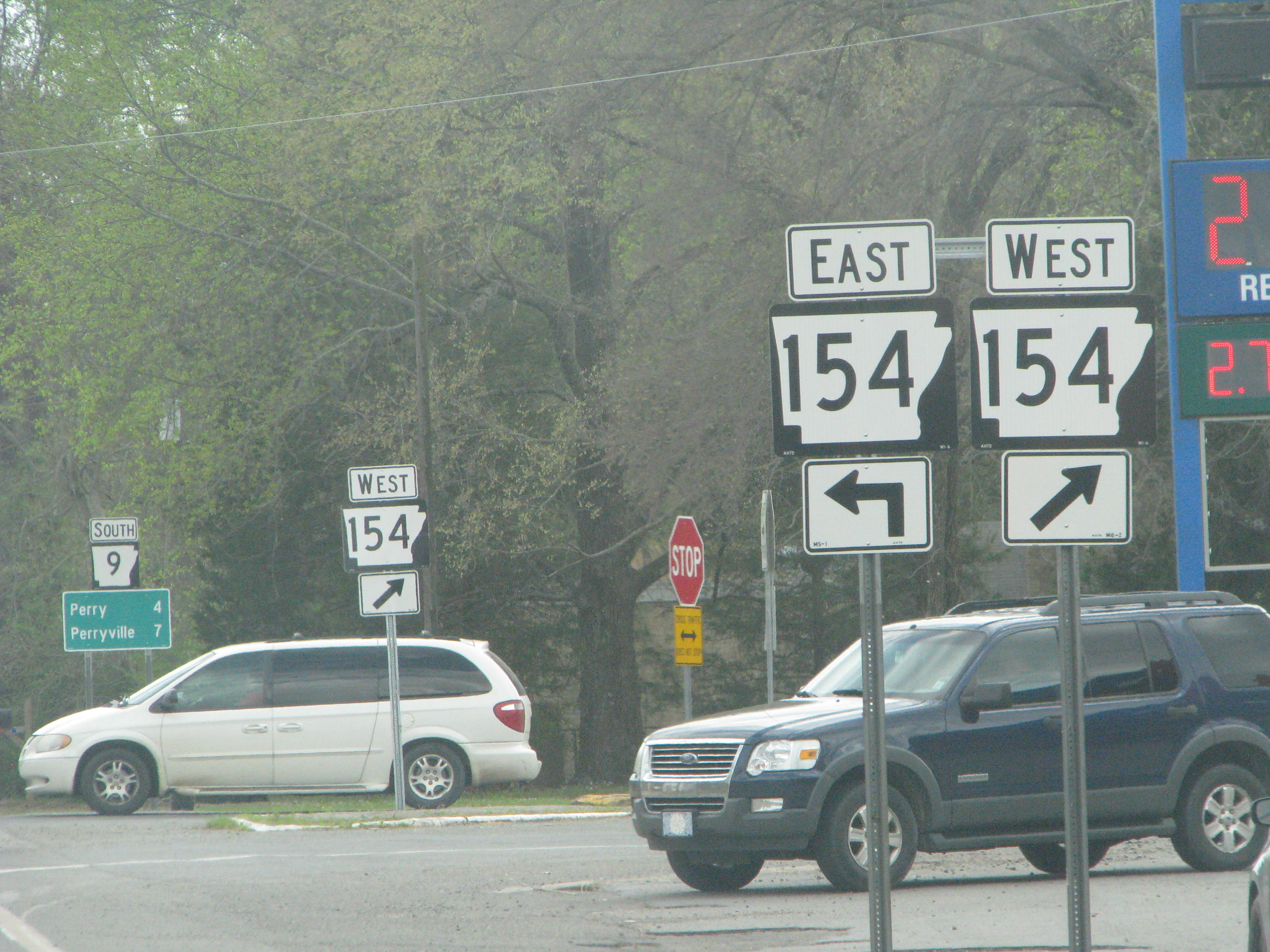
Arkansas Highway 154 runs through Oppelo

Arkansas Highway 154 (also called AR 154 and Hwy. 154) is a 41.00-mile (65.98 km) east-west state highway in the western portion of the U.S. state of Arkansas. The highway begins at Arkansas Highway 27 in Yell County northeast of Danville and runs east to Arkansas Highway 113 in Conway County east of Oppelo. Highway 154 is maintained by the Arkansas State Highway and Transportation Department.

== Route description ==
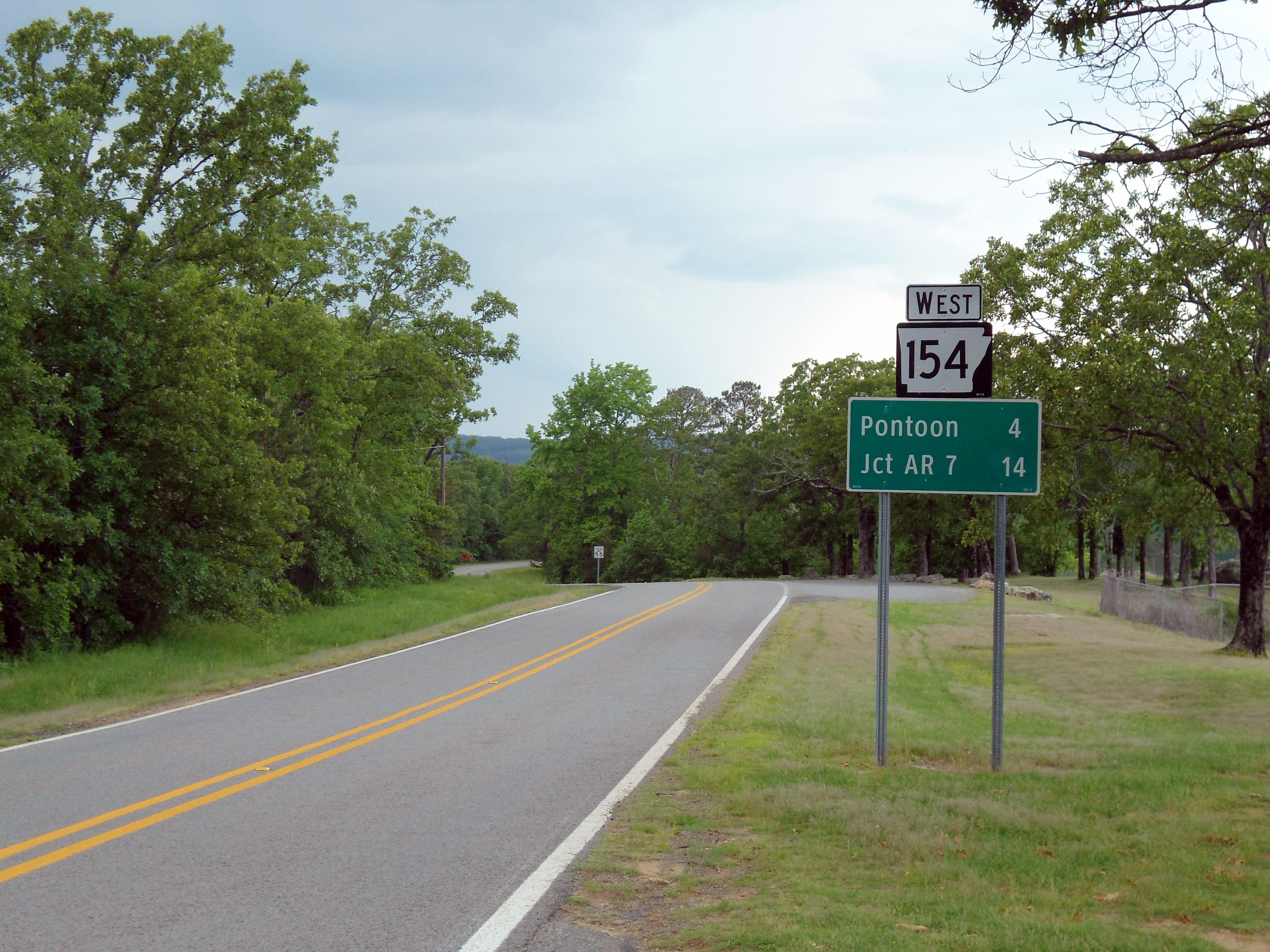
Highway 154 in Petit Jean State Park

Highway 154 begins at a junction with Highway 27 in unincorporated Yell County northeast of Danville. From here, the route heads east through a rural area to Mount George, where it meets Highway 28. The highway continues east from Mount George to an intersection with Highway 7 in Centerville. It leaves Centerville to the east, passing through the community of Liberty Hall before meeting Highway 155 in a farmed region. Past Highway 155, the road dips south around Winthrop Rockefeller Lake, running through the communities of New Neely and Cotton Town before reaching the Conway County line at the Petit Jean River.

Upon crossing into Conway County, Highway 154 heads south to meet Highway 247 in Pontoon. The highway leaves Pontoon to the east, following a crooked route into Petit Jean State Park. After meeting Highway 155 for a second time, the road roughly parallels Cedar Creek eastward through the park. It passes to the south of Lake Bailey and Petit Jean Park Airport before leaving the park to the east. At the Arkansas River, the highway turns south before curving east toward Oppelo. After meeting Highway 9 in central Oppelo, Highway 154 leaves the city and terminates at Highway 113.

== History ==
A road between Petit Jean State Park and Oppelo was first shown on state highway maps in 1936; this road was marked as Highway 154 in 1937 and was paved by 1940. Between 1942 and 1945, the Yell County section of what is now Highway 154 was added to the state highway system as part of Highway 80. In 1956, Highway 154 was extended into Yell County along the route of Highway 80; its routing has not changed since. The highway was paved between Centerville and Petit Jean State Park in 1960, and the remainder of the route was paved by 1968.

== Major intersections ==
County	Location	mi	km	Destinations	Notes
Yell		0.0	0.0	AR 27 – Danville, Dardanelle	Western terminus
Yell	Mount George	7.7	12.4	AR 28 – Dardanelle	
Yell	Centerville	11.9	19.2	AR 7 – Dardanelle, Ola	
Yell		16.2	26.1	AR 155 – Holla Bend N.W.R.	
Conway	Pontoon	21.5	34.6	AR 247	
Conway		25.7	41.4	AR 155	
Conway	Oppelo	39.3	63.2	AR 9 – Morrilton, Perryville	
Conway		40.7	65.5	AR 113 – Morrilton, Houston	Eastern terminus
1.000 mi = 1.609 km; 1.000 km = 0.621 mi

== See also ==
- List of state highways in Arkansas
