= Cleveland, Arkansas =

- Unincorporated community
- Location within Arkansas Location within the United States
- Coordinates: 35°25′17″N 92°42′35″W
- Country: United States
- State: Arkansas
- County: Conway
- Elevation: 725 ft (221 m)

Population (2020)
  - Total: 76
- Time zone: UTC-6 (Central (CST))
  - Summer (DST): UTC-5 (CDT)
- ZIP code: 72030
- Area code: 501
- GNIS feature ID: 76637

Cleveland is an unincorporated community in Conway County, Arkansas, United States. Cleveland is located on Arkansas Highway 95, 19 miles (31 km) north of Morrilton and 24 miles south of Clinton. Cleveland has a post office with ZIP code 72030. Cleveland was founded in 1890, named after former President Grover Cleveland.

"Downtown" Cleveland consists of the Cleveland Post Office, the Cleveland Corner Store, the Cleveland Volunteer Fire Department, the Cleveland Community Center, and the Cleveland Cemetery. The cemetery is the final resting place for a handful of veterans from the American Civil War, as well as 20th century conflicts such as World War I, World War II, and the Vietnam War.

Highway 95, which runs through Cleveland, connects the cities of Morrilton in Conway County, and Clinton in Van Buren County. The Ozark National Forest is nearby, providing people with hunting, fishing, hiking, and camping opportunities. There is also an ATV and motorcycle trail in the forest near Brock Creek Lake.

The main industries in Cleveland are commercial broiler chicken growers for Tyson Foods, cattle husbandry, and natural gas extraction in the Fayetteville Shale.

In September 2023, property at the corner of Hwy 95 and Lentz Rd was fenced off and converted into a town park. The 1st Annual Cleveland Days Festival was held at this site on September 15 and 16 as a fundraiser for the new park, with the intention of having a festival every year in mid-September. The 2nd annual Cleveland Days Festival was held on September 14, 2024. The 3rd annual festival was held on September 27, 2025.

== Education ==
Public education for elementary and secondary school students is provided by the Wonderview School District of north Conway County, which leads students to graduate from Wonderview High School (which has a Hattieville postal address), 7 miles (11 km) south of Cleveland on Highway 95.
