= Mount Olive, Conway County, Arkansas =

Mount Olive, Arkansas
- Unincorporated community
- Location within Arkansas Location within the United States
- Coordinates: 35°11′48″N 92°33′19″W
- Country: United States
- State: Arkansas
- County: Conway
- Elevation: 387 ft (118 m)
- Time zone: UTC-6 (Central (CST))
  - Summer (DST): UTC-5 (CDT)
- Area code: 501
- GNIS feature ID: 58224

Mount Olive is an unincorporated community in Conway County, Arkansas, United States. Mount Olive is located in eastern Conway County, 3.3 miles (5.3 km) north of Menifee.
