= New Neely, Arkansas =

- Unincorporated community
- Location within Arkansas Location within the United States
- Coordinates: 35°06′57″N 93°04′53″W
- Country: United States
- State: Arkansas
- County: Yell
- Elevation: 338 ft (103 m)
- Time zone: UTC-6 (Central (CST))
  - Summer (DST): UTC-5 (CDT)
- Area code: 479
- GNIS feature ID: 77836

New Neely is an unincorporated community in Yell County, Arkansas, United States, located on Arkansas Highway 154, 8.6 miles (13.8 km) south-southeast of Dardanelle.
