= Arkansas Highway 356 =

State highway in Arkansas, United States

Highway 356

Route information
- Maintained by ArDOT
- Length: 11.529 mi (18.554 km)
- Existed: July 10, 1957–present

Major junctions
- West end: AR 92
- AR 225
- East end: AR 25 / AR 124 in Quitman

Location
- Country: United States
- State: Arkansas
- Counties: Cleburne, Van Buren

Highway system
- Arkansas Highway System; Interstate; US; State; Business; Spurs; Suffixed; Scenic; Heritage
← AR 355	→ AR 357

Highway 356 (AR 356, Hwy. 356) is an east–west state highway in north-central Arkansas. The route of 11.65 miles (18.75 km) runs from AR 92 near Bee Branch east to AR 25/AR 124 in Quitman. The route was created in 1957 and extended in 1960. It is maintained by the Arkansas Department of Transportation (ArDOT).

== Route description ==
AR 356 begins at AR 92 east of Bee Branch and south of Morganton in southern Van Buren County. The route runs east for through a sparsely populated part of the Arkansas Ozarks, passing through the unincorporated community of Fairbanks before entering Cleburne County. AR 356 continues east to a junction with AR 255, where the route turns south to cross Cadron Creek and enter the small town of Quitman. In Quitman, the route is named Bee Branch Road and runs south to intersect a concurrency between AR 25/AR 124, where it terminates.

== History ==
The Arkansas General Assembly passed the Act 148 of 1957, the Milum Road Act, creating 10–12 miles (16–19 km) of new state highways in each county. The Arkansas State Highway Commission created AR 356 along a county road in Van Buren County on July 10, 1957. It was extended from the Cleburne-Van Buren County line to Quitman on June 29, 1960, as part of an extension of many Milum Roads to "more logical termini".

== Major intersections ==
County	Location	mi	km	Destinations	Notes
Van Buren		0.000	0.000	AR 92 – Bee Branch, Higden	Western terminus
Cleburne		9.43	15.18	AR 225 north – Cross Roads	
Cleburne	Quitman	11.529	18.554	AR 25 / AR 124 (Heber Springs Road) – Heber Springs, Conway	Eastern terminus
1.000 mi = 1.609 km; 1.000 km = 0.621 mi
