= Nemo Vista High School =

Location
- 5690 Highway 9 Center Ridge, Arkansas 72027; United States
- Coordinates: 35°22′7″N 92°33′49″W

Information
- School type: Comprehensive
- Established: Between 1890 and 1920
- School district: Nemo Vista School District
- NCES District ID: 0510410
- CEEB code: 040415
- NCES School ID: 051041000760
- Principal: Johnna Setzer
- Teaching staff: 35.18 (on FTE basis)
- Grades: 9–12
- Enrollment: 129 (2023–2024)
- Student to teacher ratio: 3.67
- Colors: Red and white
- Athletics conference: 1A 5 North (2012–14)
- Mascot: Redhawks
- Team name: Nemo Vista Redhawks
- Website: socs.nemo.k12.ar.us/vnews/display.v/SEC/High%20School

Nemo Vista High School is a comprehensive four-year public high school in Center Ridge, Arkansas, United States. It is one of four public high schools located in Conway County and is the sole high school administered by Nemo Vista School District serving grades 9 through 12.

== Academics ==
The assumed course of study follows the Smart Core curriculum developed by the Arkansas Department of Education (ADE), which requires students to complete at least 22 units prior to graduation. Students complete regular (core and career focus) classes and exams and may select Advanced Placement (AP) coursework and exams that may result in college credit. Nemo Vista High School is accredited by the ADE.

Nemo Vista is a member of the Arch Ford Education Service Cooperative, which provides career and technical education programs.

== Athletics ==
The Nemo Vista mascot and athletic emblem is the Redhawk with red and white serving as its school colors.

The Nemo Vista Redhawks compete in the state's smallest classification—1A Classification administered by the Arkansas Activities Association. For 2012–14, Nemo Vista competes in the 1A Region 5 North Conference. The Redhawks provide teams in volleyball, golf (boys/girls), basketball (boys/girls), baseball, softball, and track and field (boys/girls).

- Boys Basketball: 2 State Championships- 1944,1975
- Girls Basketball: 3 State Championships- 2014,2015,2016
- Softball: 2 State Championships- 2008,2011
- Baseball:1 State Championship- 1996
