= Solgohachia, Arkansas =

- Populated Place
- Interactive map of Solgohachia, Arkansas
- Coordinates: 35°15′22″N 92°40′35″W
- Country: United States
- State: Arkansas
- County: Conway
- Elevation: 427 ft (130 m)
- Time zone: UTC-6 (Central (CST))
  - Summer (DST): UTC-5 (CDT)
- Area code: 501
- GNIS feature ID: 54998

Solgohachia /ˌsɑː.ɡəˈhæ.tʃi/ saw-gə-HA-chee is an unincorporated community in Conway County, Arkansas, United States, about 10 miles (16 km) north of Morrilton on Arkansas Highway 9 and Arkansas Highway 287. The ZIP Code for Solgohachia is 72156. The name is from the Choctaw word Sok-ko-huch-cha, meaning "muscadine river".

Nearby Solgohachia Bridge was listed on the National Register of Historic Places on May 26, 2004. Unfortunately the old steel span bridge no longer exists. The creek it spanned is East Fork Point Remove Creek.

== Education ==
It is in the South Conway County School District. It operates Morrilton High School.
