= Jerusalem, Arkansas =

- Census-designated place
- Location within Arkansas Location within the United States
- Coordinates: 35°24′17″N 92°49′01″W
- Country: United States
- State: Arkansas
- County: Conway
- Elevation: 761 ft (232 m)

Population (2020)
  - Total: 137
- Time zone: UTC-6 (Central (CST))
  - Summer (DST): UTC-5 (CDT)
- ZIP code: 72080
- Area code: 501
- GNIS feature ID: 2805655

Jerusalem is an unincorporated community and census-designated place (CDP) in Conway County, Arkansas, United States. It was first listed as a CDP in the 2020 census with a population of 137. Jerusalem is located on Arkansas Highway 124, 18 miles (29 km) north-northwest of Morrilton. Jerusalem has a post office with ZIP code 72080.

== Name ==
Jerusalem is named for Jerusalem, which is considered a holy city to Muslims, Jews, and Christians.

== Education ==
Public education for elementary and secondary school students is provided by the Wonderview School District, which leads students to graduate from Wonderview High School. Although Jerusalem is located in the Wonderview School District, some students go to either Hector or Clinton for education.

== Demographics ==
Historical population
Census	Pop.	Note	%±
2020	137		—
U.S. Decennial Census; 2020

=== 2020 census ===
Jerusalem CDP, Arkansas – Racial and ethnic composition Note: the US Census treats Hispanic/Latino as an ethnic category. This table excludes Latinos from the racial categories and assigns them to a separate category. Hispanics/Latinos may be of any race.
Race / Ethnicity (NH = Non-Hispanic)	Pop 2020	% 2020
White alone (NH)	117	85.40%
Black or African American alone (NH)	0	0.00%
Native American or Alaska Native alone (NH)	4	2.92%
Asian alone (NH)	0	0.00%
Pacific Islander alone (NH)	0	0.00%
Some Other Race alone (NH)	0	0.00%
Mixed Race or Multi-Racial (NH)	11	8.03%
Hispanic or Latino (any race)	5	3.65%
Total	137	100.00%
