= Pontoon, Arkansas =

- Unincorporated community
- Location within Arkansas Location within the United States
- Coordinates: 35°06′43″N 93°00′38″W
- Country: United States
- State: Arkansas
- County: Conway
- Elevation: 322 ft (98 m)
- Time zone: UTC-6 (Central (CST))
  - Summer (DST): UTC-5 (CDT)
- Area code: 479
- GNIS feature ID: 58437

Pontoon is an unincorporated community in Conway County, Arkansas, United States. Pontoon is located at the junction of Arkansas highways 154 and 247, 15.3 miles (24.6 km) west-southwest of Morrilton.
