= Springfield, Arkansas =

Census-designated place in Arkansas, United States

- Census-designated place
- Location in the U.S. state of Arkansas
- Coordinates: 35°16′03″N 92°33′28″W
- Country: United States
- State: Arkansas
- County: Conway
- Founded: July 8, 1856 (170 years ago)

Area
  - Total: 1.8 sq mi (4.6 km^{2})
- Elevation: 472 ft (144 m)

Population (2020)
  - Total: 223
- Time zone: UTC-6 (Central (CST))
  - Summer (DST): UTC-5 (CDT)
- GNIS feature ID: 2805686

Springfield is a census-designated place (CDP) in Conway County, Arkansas, United States. It was first listed as a CDP in the 2020 census with a population of 223.

== Demographics ==
Historical population
Census	Pop.	Note	%±
2020	223		—
U.S. Decennial Census; 2020

=== 2020 census ===
Springfield CDP, Arkansas – Demographic Profile (NH = Non-Hispanic) Note: the US Census treats Hispanic/Latino as an ethnic category. This table excludes Latinos from the racial categories and assigns them to a separate category. Hispanics/Latinos may be of any race.
Race / Ethnicity	Pop 2020	% 2020
White alone (NH)	195	87.44%
Black or African American alone (NH)	3	1.35%
Native American or Alaska Native alone (NH)	0	0.00%
Asian alone (NH)	0	0.00%
Pacific Islander alone (NH)	0	0.00%
Some Other Race alone (NH)	0	0.00%
Mixed Race/Multi-Racial (NH)	19	8.52%
Hispanic or Latino (any race)	6	2.69%
Total	223	100.00%

== Education ==
Springfield is in the South Conway County School District. The district operates Morrilton High School.
