= Caglesville, Arkansas =

- Unincorporated community
- Caglesville's position in Arkansas. Caglesville, Arkansas (the United States)
- Coordinates: 35°23′43″N 92°57′53″W
- Country: United States
- State: Arkansas
- County: Pope County, Arkansas
- Elevation: 781 ft (238 m)
- Time zone: UTC-6 (Central (CST))
  - Summer (DST): UTC-5 (CDT)
- GNIS feature ID: 76492

Caglesville is an unincorporated community in Center Township, Pope County, Arkansas, United States. The community was named for N. P. Cagle, a local mill operator.
