= Economy, Arkansas =

- Unincorporated community
- Center Valley's position in Arkansas. Economy, Arkansas (the United States)
- Coordinates: 35°18′00″N 92°53′35″W
- Country: United States
- State: Arkansas
- County: Pope
- Elevation: 335 ft (102 m)
- Time zone: UTC-6 (Central (CST))
  - Summer (DST): UTC-5 (CDT)
- GNIS feature ID: 57698

Economy is an unincorporated community in Burnett Township, Pope County, Arkansas, United States.

As of 2024 Mark Coffman is serving as Constable.
