= University of Arkansas Community College at Morrilton =

Public college in Morrilton, Arkansas, US

University of Arkansas Community College at Morrilton (UACCM)
- Former names: Petit Jean Vocational Technical School, Petit Jean Technical College, Petit Jean College
- Type: Public community college
- Established: 1961
- Parent institution: University of Arkansas System
- Chancellor: Lisa Willenberg
- Undergraduates: 2,225
- Location: Morrilton, Arkansas, United States; 35°10′20″N 92°43′46″W
- Campus: Town
- Colors: Red and black
- Mascot: Timberwolves
- Website: www.uaccm.edu

The University of Arkansas Community College at Morrilton (UACCM) is public community college in Morrilton, Arkansas. It is accredited by the Higher Learning Commission.

== History ==
The 1961 Arkansas General Assembly established Petit Jean Vo-Tech as the state's second adult vocational-technical school. The first building was completed in July 1963 and classes began in September. The school initially awarded diplomas in occupational-specific areas.

In 1991, the General Assembly converted Petit Jean Vo-Tech to a degree granting two-year college, Petit Jean Technical College. The conversion permitted expansion of the curriculum to include technical, academic & workforce education; community education; and adult education. In 1997, the College again made a name change to Petit Jean College. Finally, in 2001, Petit Jean College merged with the University of Arkansas System and became the University of Arkansas Community College at Morrilton.

In 2018, the College opened the Workforce Training Center that expanded facilities for technical education, non-credit workforce training, and community education.

UACCM currently consists of 92 acres (370,000 m^{2}) with 14 educational buildings and various support facilities.

== Campus ==
UACCM is located along Interstate 40 approximately 50 miles (80 km) west of Little Rock in the town of Morrilton in Conway County, Arkansas.

== Students ==
In the fall 2017 semester, UACCM served 1,925 total credit students. Of those students, 62 percent were considered full-time (enrolling in 12 or more credit hours per semester), and 38 percent were considered part-time. The student body was made of 38 percent male and 62 percent female. Seventy percent of the students body is age 24 and below.

Since UACCM's last year as a vocational technical school in 1990, overall enrollment has grown over 500 percent, with the student population doubling in size since merging with the University of Arkansas System in 2001.
