= Center Ridge, Arkansas =

- Census-designated place
- Location of Center Ridge in Conway County, Arkansas.

- Location within Arkansas
- Coordinates: 35°22′26″N 92°33′47″W
- Country: United States
- State: Arkansas
- County: Conway

Area
  - Total: 9.53 sq mi (24.67 km^{2})
  - Land: 9.47 sq mi (24.53 km^{2})
  - Water: 0.054 sq mi (0.14 km^{2})
- Elevation: 728 ft (222 m)

Population (2020)
  - Total: 290
  - Density: 30.6/sq mi (11.82/km^{2})
- Time zone: UTC-6 (Central (CST))
  - Summer (DST): UTC-5 (CDT)
- Area code: 501
- GNIS feature ID: 2612124

Center Ridge is an unincorporated census-designated place in Conway County, Arkansas, United States. Per the 2020 census, the population was 2,235.

== Demographics ==
Historical population
Census	Pop.	Note	%±
2010	388		—
2020	290		−25.3%
U.S. Decennial Census; 2010 2020

=== 2020 census ===
Center Ridge CDP, Arkansas – Racial and ethnic composition Note: the US Census treats Hispanic/Latino as an ethnic category. This table excludes Latinos from the racial categories and assigns them to a separate category. Hispanics/Latinos may be of any race.
Race / Ethnicity (NH = Non-Hispanic)	Pop 2010	Pop 2020	% 2010	% 2020
White alone (NH)	343	259	88.40%	89.31%
Black or African American alone (NH)	20	6	5.15%	2.07%
Native American or Alaska Native alone (NH)	13	0	3.35%	0.00%
Asian alone (NH)	2	0	0.52%	0.00%
Pacific Islander alone (NH)	0	0	0.00%	0.00%
Some Other Race alone (NH)	0	0	0.00%	0.00%
Mixed Race or Multi-Racial (NH)	3	16	0.77%	5.52%
Hispanic or Latino (any race)	7	9	1.80%	3.10%
Total	388	290	100.00%	100.00%

== Education ==
Center Ridge is the headquarters of the Nemo Vista School District and home to Nemo Vista High School. The school's mascot is the Redhawks and red and white serve as the school colors.

== Notable people ==
- Clifton Clowers, subject of the hit song "Wolverton Mountain", by Merle Kilgore and Claude King
- Conlan and John Carter, actors
- Matt Stell, country singer

== Catholic Point ==
To the southeast of Center Ridge is a small Italian settlement named Catholic Point that was founded in the late nineteenth century. It maintains its cultural identity and attracts over 2500 people yearly to its annual church picnic.
