= Oppelo, Arkansas =

- City
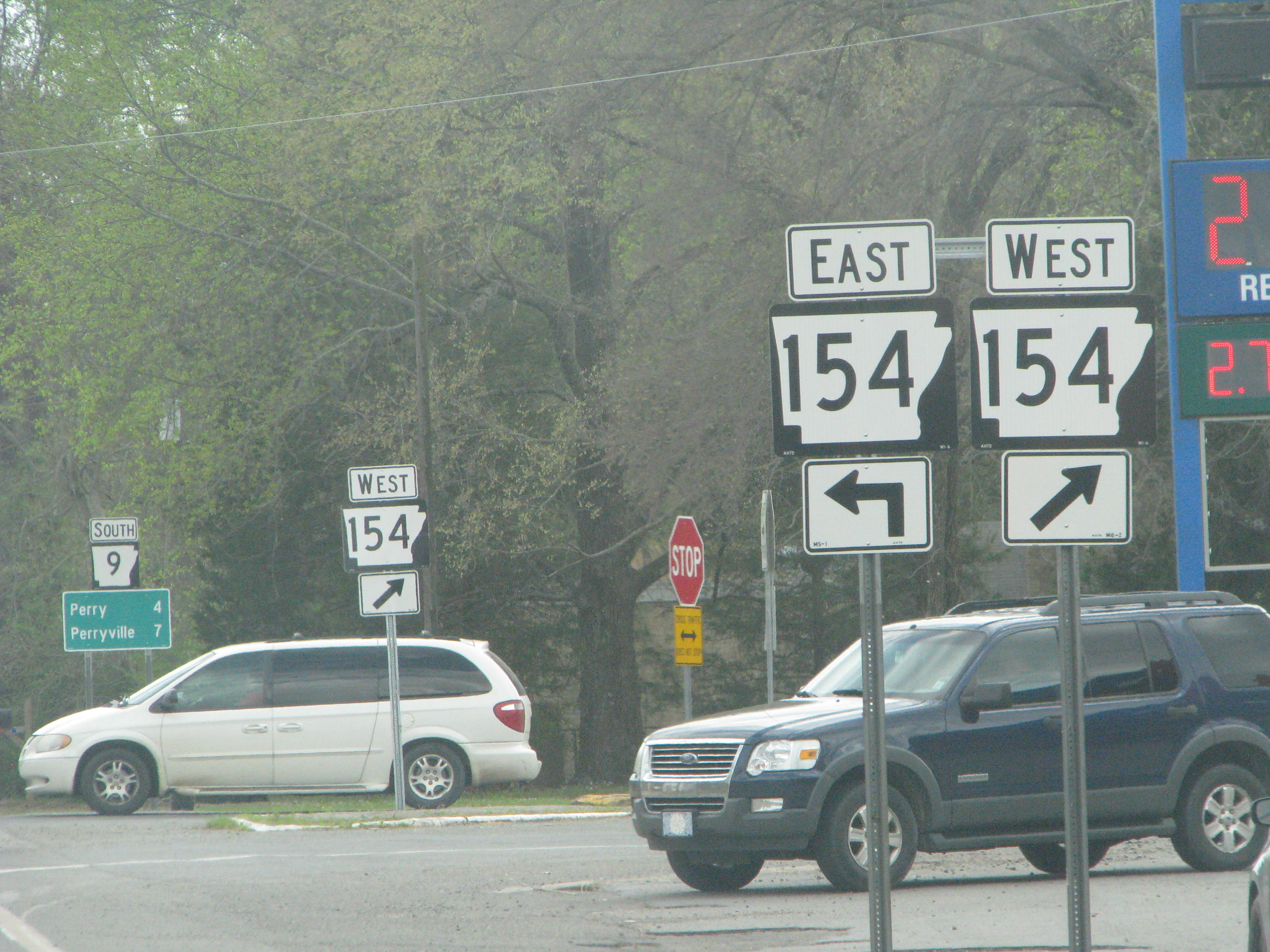
- Arkansas Highway 154 runs through Oppelo

- Location of Oppelo in Conway County, Arkansas.
- Coordinates: 35°6′9″N 92°46′6″W
- Country: United States
- State: Arkansas
- County: Conway

Area
  - Total: 2.48 sq mi (6.43 km^{2})
  - Land: 2.43 sq mi (6.29 km^{2})
  - Water: 0.050 sq mi (0.13 km^{2})
- Elevation: 338 ft (103 m)

Population (2020)
  - Total: 737
  - Estimate (2025): 766 ▲
  - Density: 303.2/sq mi (117.08/km^{2})
- Time zone: UTC-6 (Central (CST))
  - Summer (DST): UTC-5 (CDT)
- ZIP code: 72110
- Area code: 501
- FIPS code: 05-52430
- GNIS feature ID: 0053063
- Website: cityofoppelo.com

Oppelo /ˈɑː.pəˌloʊ/ AH-pə-loh is a city in Conway County, Arkansas, United States. As of the 2020 census, Oppelo had a population of 737.

== Geography ==
Oppelo is located near the southern border of Conway County at 35°6′9″N 92°46′6″W (35.102495, -92.768276). By Arkansas Highway 9, it is 3 miles (5 km) south of the Arkansas River and 6 miles (10 km) south of the center of Morrilton, the county seat.

According to the United States Census Bureau, Oppelo has a total area of 2.5 square miles (6.5 km^{2}), of which 2.5 square miles (6.4 km^{2}) is land and 0.04 square miles (0.1 km^{2}), or 2.05%, is water.

== Demographics ==
Historical population
Census	Pop.	Note	%±
1970	147		—
1980	486		230.6%
1990	643		32.3%
2000	725		12.8%
2010	781		7.7%
2020	737		−5.6%
2025 (est.)	766	▲	3.9%
U.S. Decennial Census

As of the census of 2000, there were 725 people, 258 households, and 204 families residing in the city. The population density was 292.6 inhabitants per square mile (113.0/km^{2}). There were 285 housing units at an average density of 115.0 per square mile (44.4/km^{2}). The racial makeup of the city was 98.76% White, 0.14% Black or African American, 0.83% from other races, and 0.28% from two or more races. 2.48% of the population were Hispanic or Latino of any race.

There were 258 households, out of which 41.1% had children under the age of 18 living with them, 67.8% were married couples living together, 7.4% had a female householder with no husband present, and 20.9% were non-families. 16.7% of all households were made up of individuals, and 7.0% had someone living alone who was 65 years of age or older. The average household size was 2.81 and the average family size was 3.17.

In the city, the population was spread out, with 28.4% under the age of 18, 9.5% from 18 to 24, 28.8% from 25 to 44, 20.6% from 45 to 64, and 12.7% who were 65 years of age or older. The median age was 32 years. For every 100 females, there were 103.7 males. For every 100 females age 18 and over, there were 98.1 males.

The median income for a household in the city was $32,202, and the median income for a family was $41,667. Males had a median income of $32,083 versus $19,167 for females. The per capita income for the city was $18,674. About 10.1% of families and 13.2% of the population were below the poverty line, including 19.1% of those under age 18 and 9.8% of those age 65 or over.
