= Hattieville, Arkansas =

- Census-designated place
- Location within Arkansas Location within the United States
- Coordinates: 35°17′15″N 92°47′13″W
- Country: United States
- State: Arkansas
- County: Conway
- Elevation: 358 ft (109 m)

Population (2020)
  - Total: 132
- Time zone: UTC-6 (Central (CST))
  - Summer (DST): UTC-5 (CDT)
- ZIP code: 72063
- Area code: 501
- GNIS feature ID: 2805651

Hattieville is an unincorporated community and census-designated place (CDP) in Conway County, Arkansas, United States. It was first listed as a CDP in the 2020 census with a population of 132. Hattieville is located on Arkansas Highway 213, 9.5 miles (15.3 km) north-northwest of Morrilton. Hattieville has a post office with ZIP code 72063.

== Demographics ==
Historical population
Census	Pop.	Note	%±
2020	132		—
U.S. Decennial Census; 2020

=== 2020 census ===
Hattieville CDP, Arkansas – Racial and ethnic composition Note: the US Census treats Hispanic/Latino as an ethnic category. This table excludes Latinos from the racial categories and assigns them to a separate category. Hispanics/Latinos may be of any race.
Race / Ethnicity (NH = Non-Hispanic)	Pop 2020	% 2020
White alone (NH)	129	97.73%
Black or African American alone (NH)	0	0.00%
Native American or Alaska Native alone (NH)	0	0.00%
Asian alone (NH)	0	0.00%
Pacific Islander alone (NH)	0	0.00%
Some Other Race alone (NH)	0	0.00%
Mixed Race or Multi-Racial (NH)	3	2.27%
Hispanic or Latino (any race)	0	0.00%
Total	132	100.00%
