= Conway County, Arkansas =

County in Arkansas, United States

- County
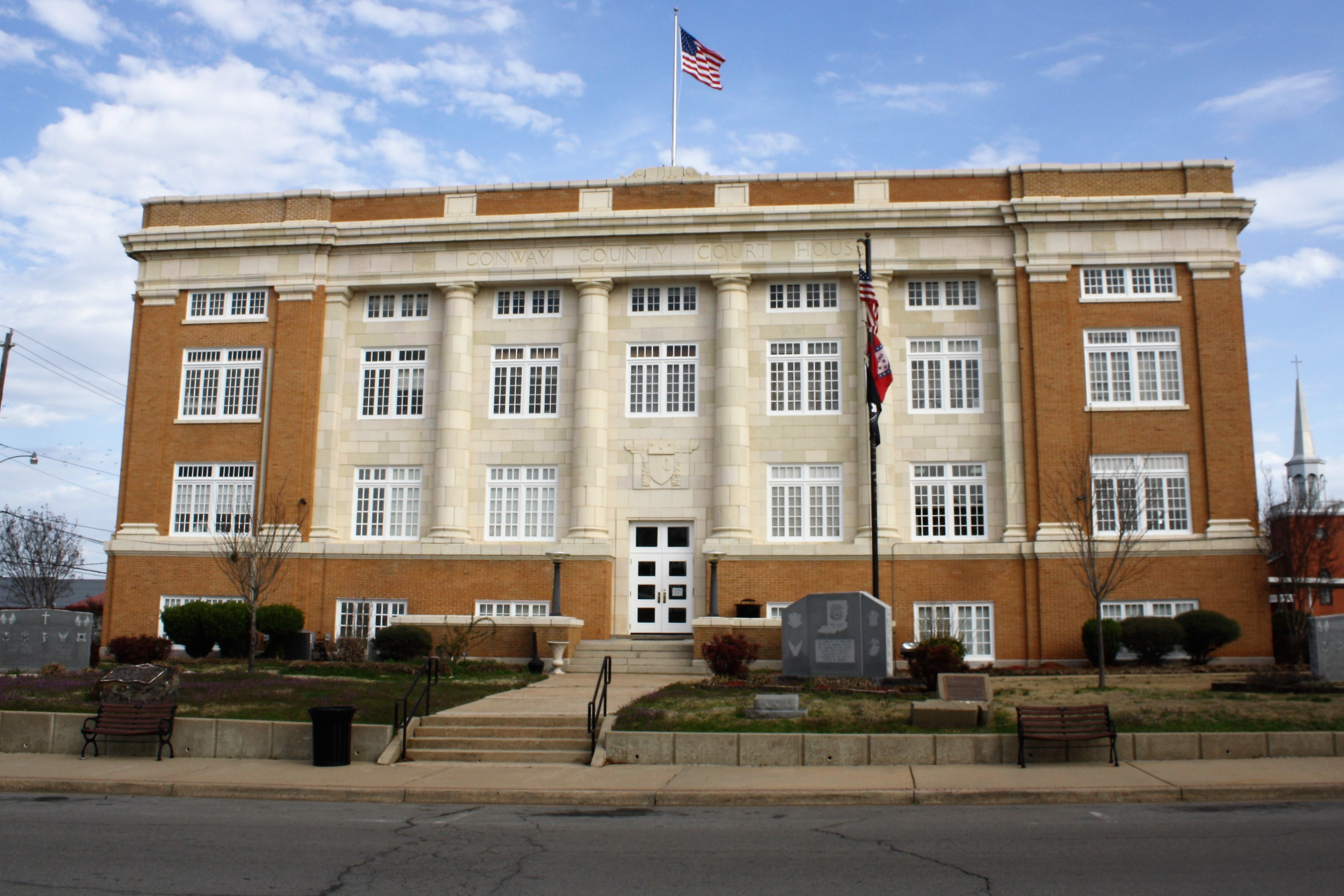
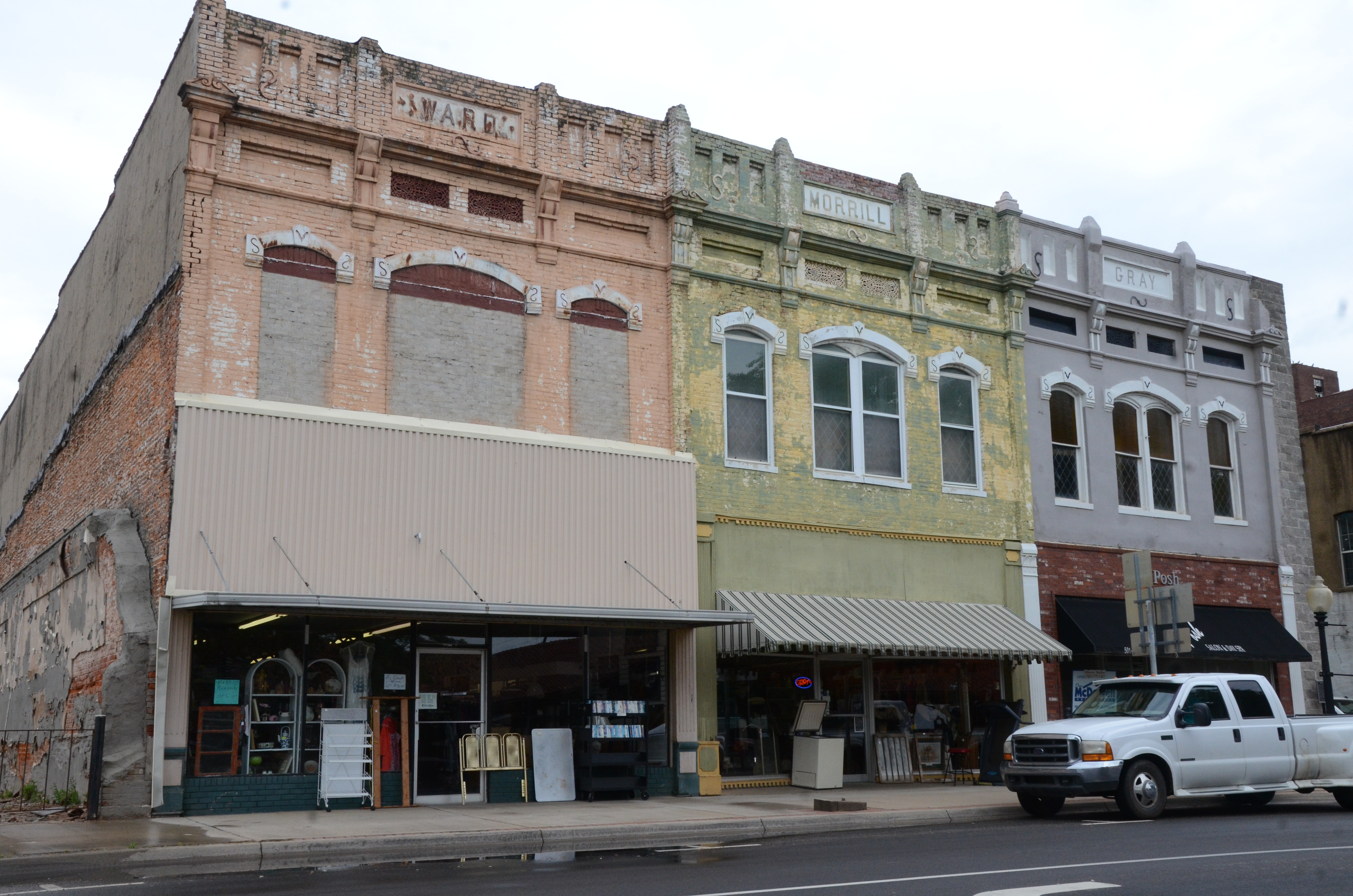
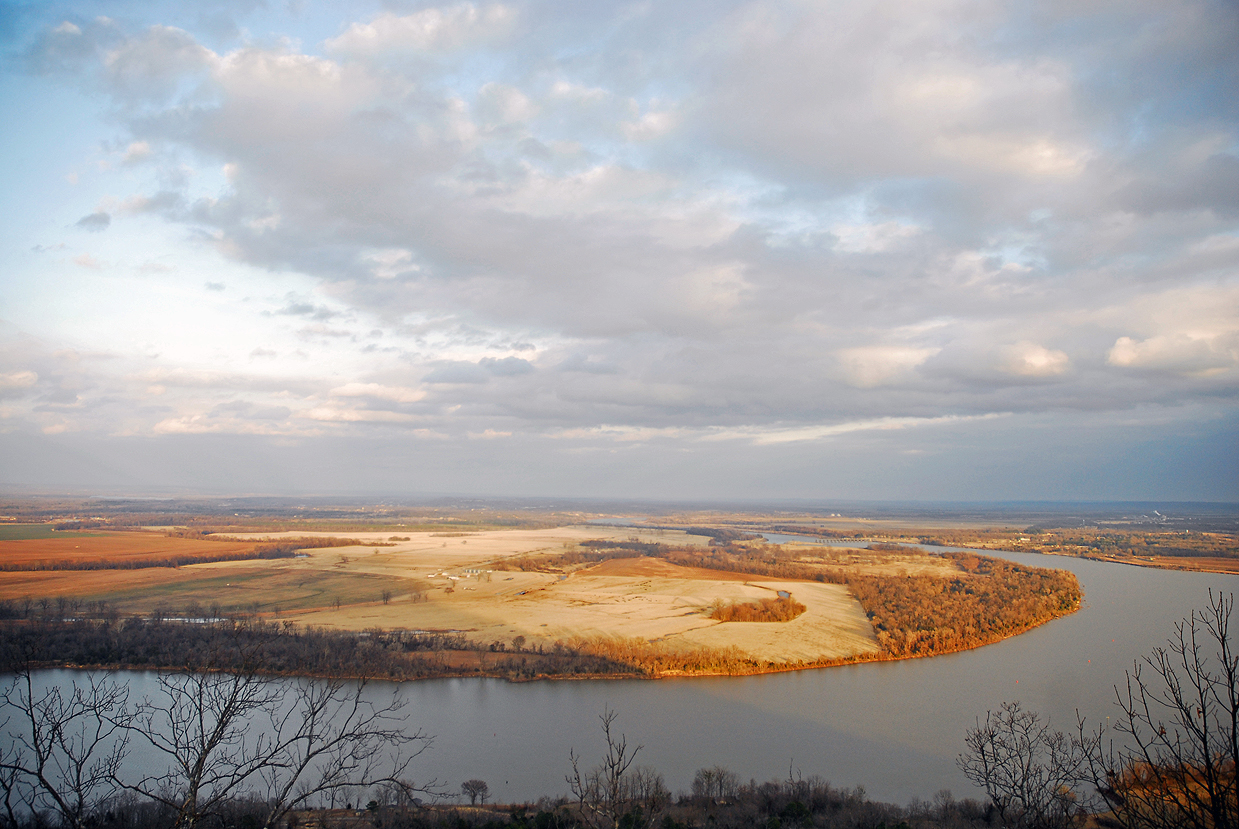
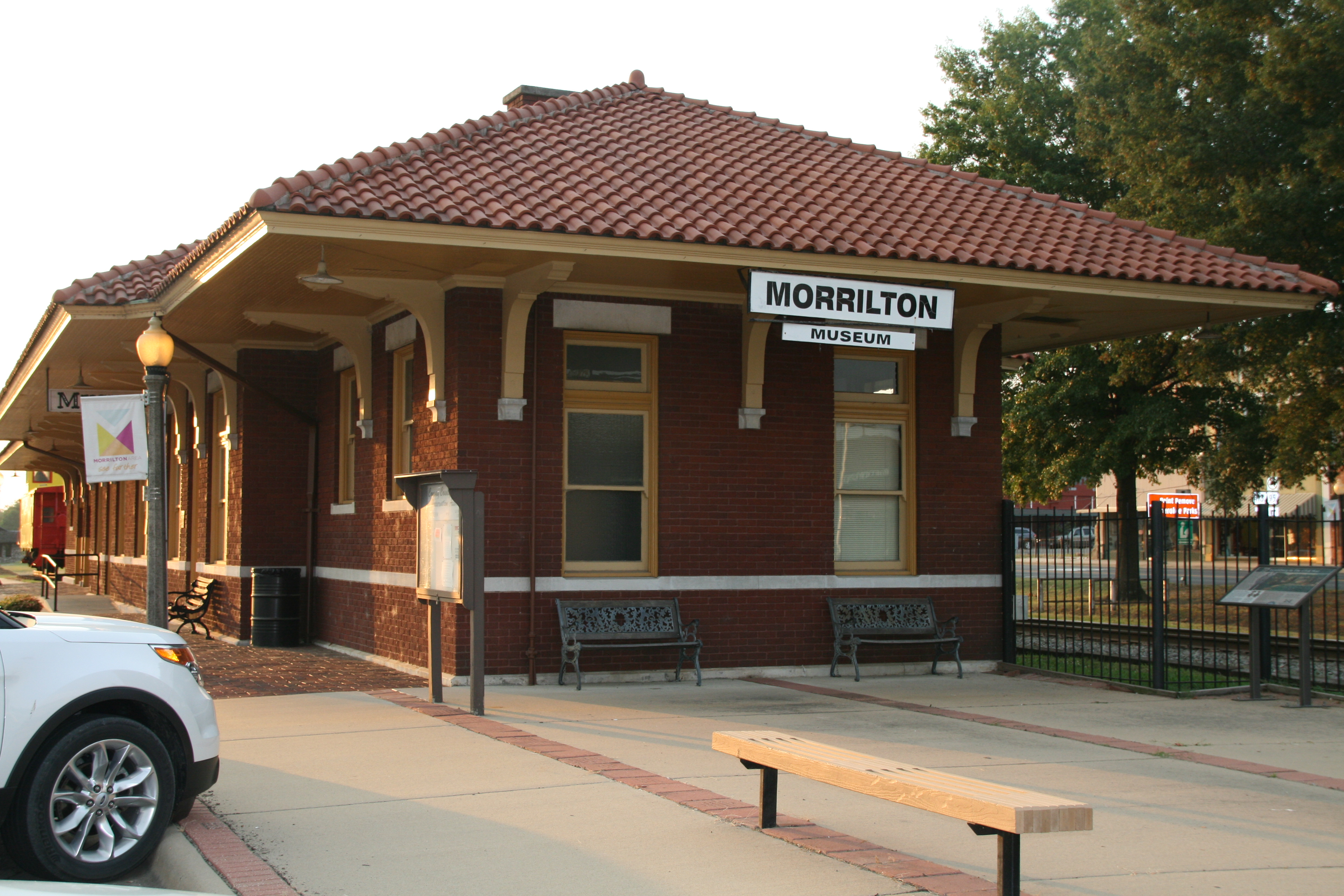
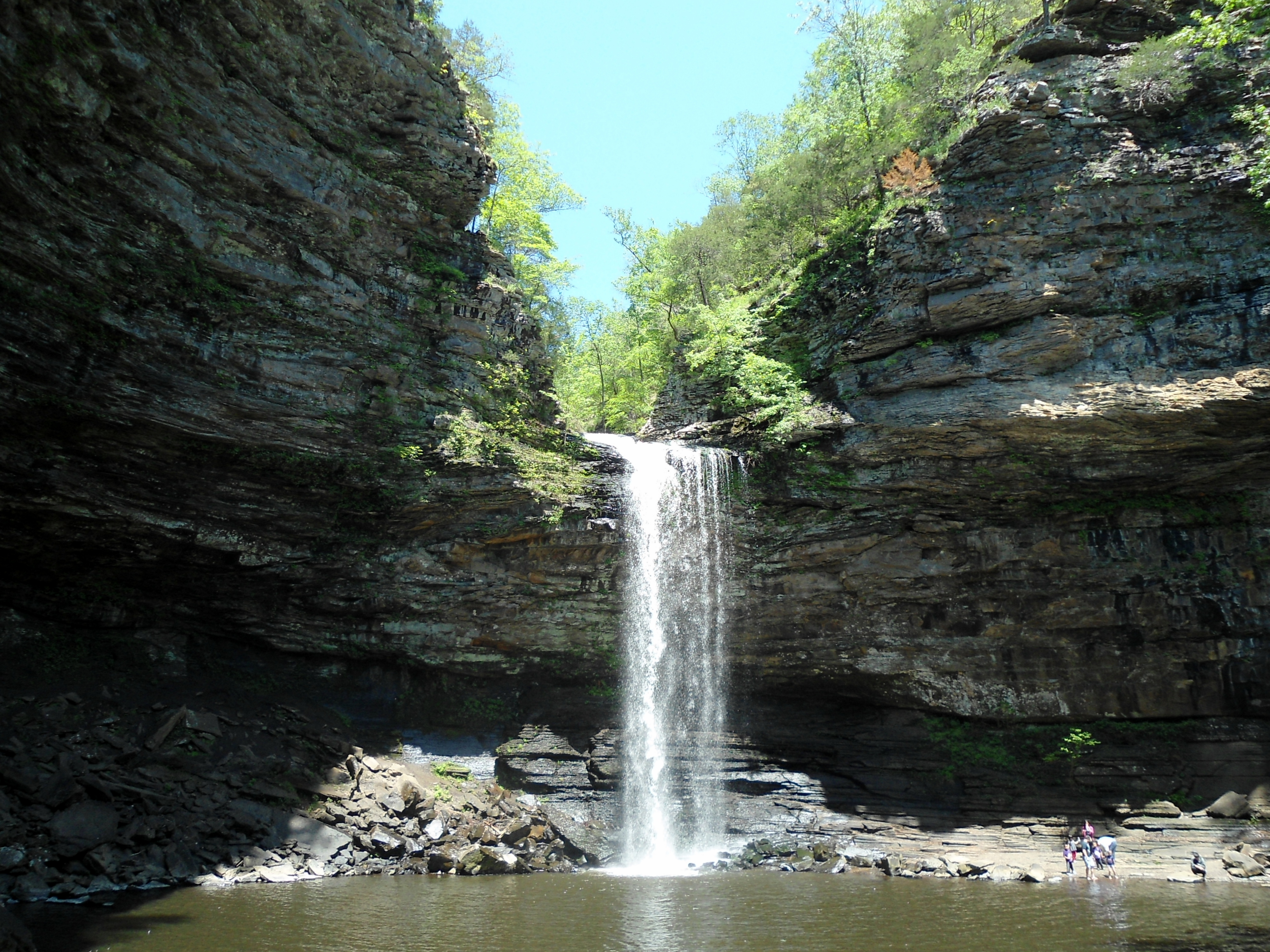
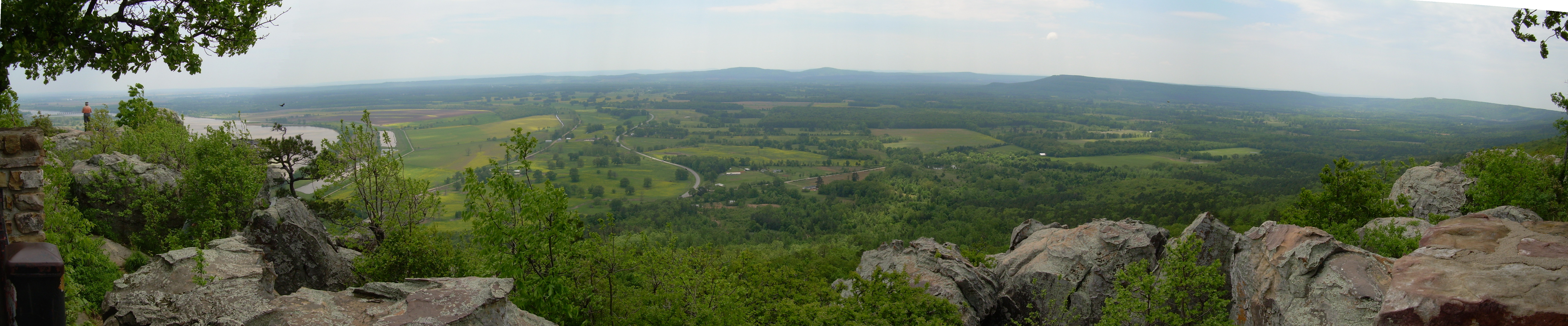
- Clockwise from top: Conway County Courthouse, the Arkansas River, Cedar Falls, a panoramic view of the Arkansas River Valley from Petit Jean State Park, the Morrilton Train Station, and downtown Morrilton

- Location within the U.S. state of Arkansas
- Coordinates: 35°16′00″N 92°42′00″W
- Country: United States
- State: Arkansas
- Founded: October 20, 1825
- Named for: Henry Wharton Conway
- Seat: Morrilton
- Largest city: Morrilton

Area
  - Total: 566.66 sq mi (1,467.6 km^{2})
  - Land: 556.15 sq mi (1,440.4 km^{2})
  - Water: 10.51 sq mi (27.2 km^{2}) 1.8%

Population (2020)
  - Total: 20,715
  - Estimate (2025): 21,393 ▲
  - Density: 37.247/sq mi (14.381/km^{2})
- Time zone: UTC−6 (Central)
  - Summer (DST): UTC−5 (CDT)
- Congressional district: 2nd
- Website: conwaycountyar.com

Conway County is a county located in the U.S. state of Arkansas. Created as Arkansas's 11th county on October 20, 1825, Conway County has four incorporated municipalities, including Morrilton, the county seat and most populous city. The county is also the site of numerous unincorporated communities and ghost towns. The county was formed from a portion of Pulaski County and is named for Henry Wharton Conway, a politician from a powerful political family who served as the delegate from the Arkansas Territory to the U.S. Congress from 1823 to 1827.

In 2010, the center of population of Arkansas was located in Conway County, near the city of Plumerville. As of the 2020 census, the population was 20,715.

== History ==
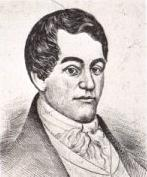
Henry W. Conway, namesake for Conway County.

Conway County was formed on October 20, 1825, from a portion of Pulaski County and named for Henry Wharton Conway, who was the territorial delegate to the U.S. Congress.

From 1831 until 1883, Lewisburg was the county seat. When the Little Rock and Fort Smith Railroad planned built tracks 1 mile (1.6 km) north of Lewisburg in 1871, the proposed depot was to be named Morrilton after farmer E. J. Morrill, who sold the land to the railroad. People relocated from Lewisburg to Morrilton beginning in 1880, county government was relocated in 1883, and the depot was built in 1910.

Conway County was much larger upon creation. Van Buren County was created from parts of Conway, Izard, and Independence counties on November 11, 1833. Perry County was created from Conway County on December 18, 1840. Faulkner County was created from parts of Conway and Pulaski counties on April 12, 1873.

== Geography ==
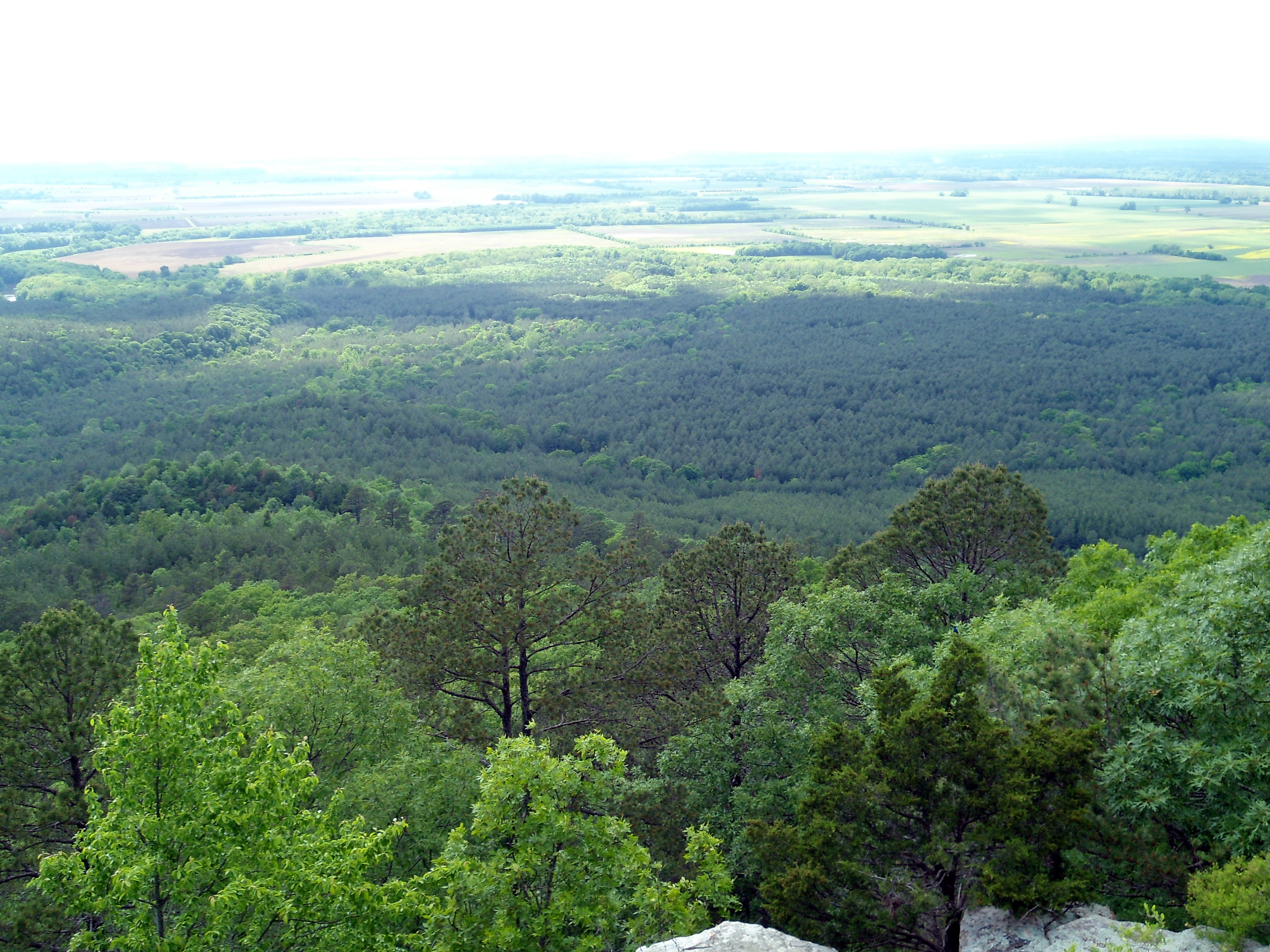
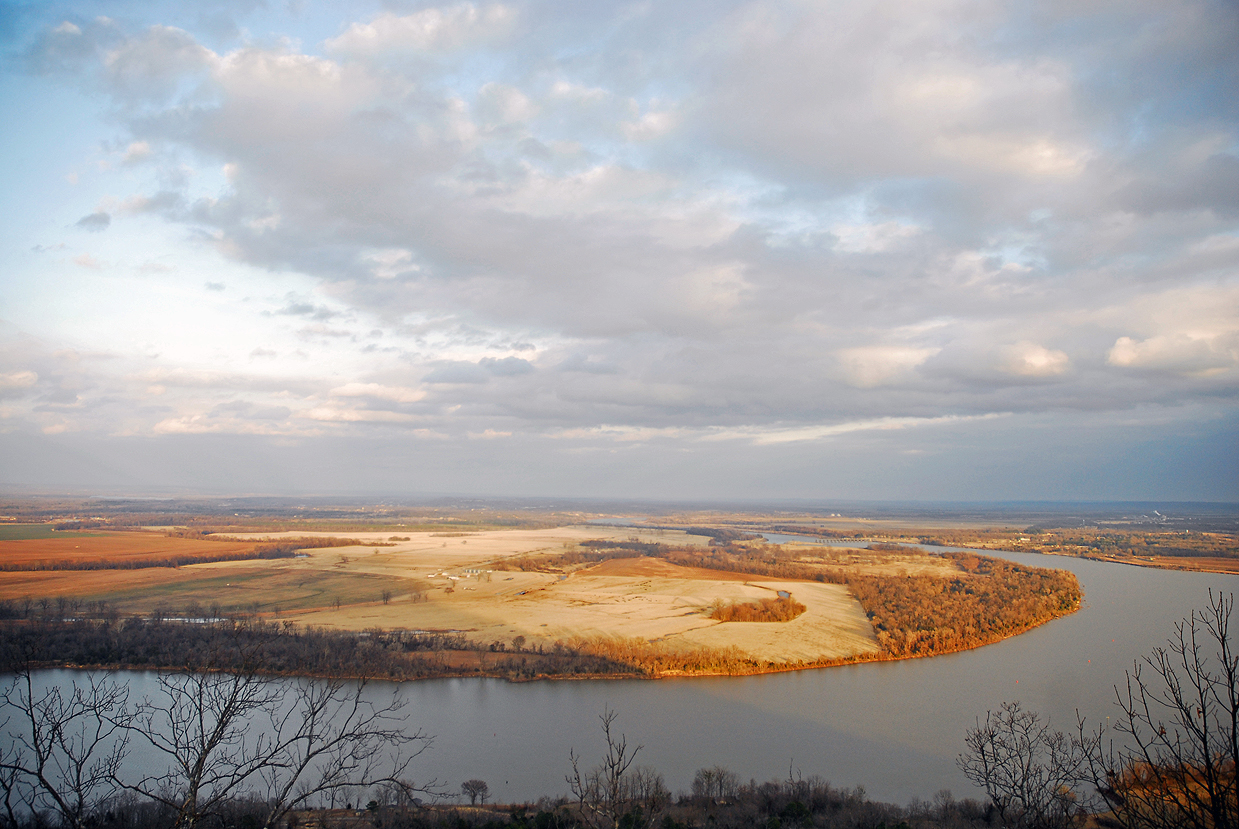
Top: View from Petit Jean Mountain
Bottom: Arkansas River winds through an alluvial plain

Conway County is within the Arkansas River Valley region, a fertile, low-lying valley along the Arkansas River between the Ozark Mountains to the north and the Ouachita Mountains to the south.

According to the U.S. Census Bureau, the county has a total area of 567 square miles (1,470 km^{2}), of which 552 square miles (1,430 km^{2}) is land and 14 square miles (36 km^{2}) (2.5%) is water. It is the fifth-smallest county in Arkansas by area.

The county is located approximately 52 miles (84 km) northwest of Little Rock, 109 miles (175 km) east of Fort Smith, and 180 miles (290 km) west of Memphis, Tennessee. (Note: Mileages from Conway County to Little Rock, Fort Smith, and Memphis are based on highway miles using county seat Morrilton for Conway County.) Conway County is surrounded by two Central Arkansas counties: Faulkner County to the east and Perry County to the south, and three River Valley/mountain counties: Van Buren County to the north, Yell County to the southwest, and Pope County to the west.

=== Protected areas ===
The northern 16 square kilometres (1,600 hectares) of Conway County is protected within the Ozark National Forest, a small part of a large protected forest spanning parts of 16 Arkansas counties. Petit Jean State Park, is Arkansas's oldest state park, rises from the River Valley in southern Conway County along the top of Petit Jean Mountain.

Conway County is home to five Wildlife Management Areas (WMAs) under Arkansas Game and Fish Commission jurisdiction. Ed Gordon Point Remove WMA is a wetland near the confluence of the East Fork and West Fork of Point Remove Creek in western Conway County. The area is known for duck, deer, and dove hunting. Lake Overcup WMA is a noted crappie fishing lake created by AGFC in 1963. Cypress Creek WMA is located around the shore of Brewer Lake, a fishing lake built in 1983 to construct a water supply for Conway, as well as containing parts of the Cherokee WMA and a small part of Piney Creeks WMA. The county is also home to the Cove Creek Natural Area.

== Demographics ==
Historical population
Census	Pop.	Note	%±
1830	982		—
1840	2,892		194.5%
1850	3,583		23.9%
1860	6,697		86.9%
1870	8,112		21.1%
1880	12,755		57.2%
1890	19,459		52.6%
1900	19,772		1.6%
1910	22,729		15.0%
1920	22,578		−0.7%
1930	21,949		−2.8%
1940	21,536		−1.9%
1950	18,137		−15.8%
1960	15,430		−14.9%
1970	16,805		8.9%
1980	19,505		16.1%
1990	19,151		−1.8%
2000	20,336		6.2%
2010	21,273		4.6%
2020	20,715		−2.6%
2025 (est.)	21,393	▲	3.3%
U.S. Decennial Census; 1790–1960 1900–1990; 1990–2000 2010

=== 2020 Census ===
As of the 2020 census, the county had a population of 20,715. The median age was 42.1 years. 22.8% of residents were under the age of 18 and 19.6% of residents were 65 years of age or older. For every 100 females there were 95.8 males, and for every 100 females age 18 and over there were 94.8 males age 18 and over.

The racial makeup of the county was 79.0% White, 10.7% Black or African American, 0.8% American Indian and Alaska Native, 0.4% Asian, <0.1% Native Hawaiian and Pacific Islander, 2.1% from some other race, and 7.0% from two or more races. Hispanic or Latino residents of any race comprised 4.3% of the population.

30.6% of residents lived in urban areas, while 69.4% lived in rural areas.

There were 8,387 households in the county, of which 29.6% had children under the age of 18 living in them. Of all households, 48.1% were married-couple households, 18.7% were households with a male householder and no spouse or partner present, and 27.2% were households with a female householder and no spouse or partner present. About 28.8% of all households were made up of individuals and 13.6% had someone living alone who was 65 years of age or older.

There were 9,646 housing units, of which 13.1% were vacant. Among occupied housing units, 73.2% were owner-occupied and 26.8% were renter-occupied. The homeowner vacancy rate was 1.9% and the rental vacancy rate was 9.0%.

=== 2010 Census ===
Racial/Ethnic Makeup of Conway County treating Hispanics as a Separate Category (2010)
1. White Non-Hispanic (82.4%)
2. Black Non-Hispanic (11.2%)
3. Native American Non-Hispanic (0.70%)
4. Asian Non-Hispanic (0.40%)
5. Pacific Islander Non-Hispanic (0.00%)
6. Other Non-Hispanic (0.00%)
7. Two or more races Non-Hispanic (1.70%)
8. Hispanic Any Race (3.60%)

As of the 2010 census, there were 21,273 people, 8,463 households, and 4,473 families in the county. The population density was 38 people per square mile (15 people/km^{2}). There were 9,720 housing units at an average density of 17 units per square mile (6.6 units/km^{2}). The racial makeup of the county was 84.2% White, 11.2% Black or African American, 0.7% Native American, 0.4% Asian, 0.0% Pacific Islander, 1.5% from other races, and 2.0% from two or more races. 3.6% of the population were Hispanic or Latino of any race.

Of the 8,463 households 28.0% had children under the age of 18 living with them, 52.9% were married couples living together, 11.8% had a female householder with no husband present, and 30.4% were non-families. 26.4% of households were one person and 11.6% were one person aged 65 or older. The average household size was 2.48 and the average family size was 2.98.

The age distribution was 24.2% under the age of 18, 7.9% from 18 to 24, 23.4% from 25 to 44, 27.7% from 45 to 64, and 16.9% 65 or older. The median age was 40.5 years. For every 100 females there were 98.1 males. For every 100 females age 18 and over, there were 95.1 males.

The median household income was $32,700 and the median family income was $48,116. Males had a median income of $38,675 versus $26,318 for females. The per capita income for the county was $19,909. About 10.2% of families and 17.0% of the population were below the poverty line, including 19.8% of those under age 18 and 14.5% of those age 65 or over.

=== 2000 Census ===
At the 2000 census, there were 20,336 people, 7,967 households, and 5,736 families in the county. The population density was 37 people per square mile (14 people/km^{2}). There were 9,028 housing units at an average density of 16 units per square mile (6.2 units/km^{2}). The racial makeup of the county was 84.27% White, 13.05% Black or African American, 0.50% Native American, 0.23% Asian, 0.03% Pacific Islander, 0.74% from other races, and 1.18% from two or more races. 1.77% of the population were Hispanic or Latino of any race.

Of the 7,967 households 31.40% had children under the age of 18 living with them, 56.70% were married couples living together, 11.50% had a female householder with no husband present, and 28.00% were non-families. 25.40% of households were one person and 12.10% were one person aged 65 or older. The average household size was 2.51 and the average family size was 2.99.

The age distribution was 25.40% under the age of 18, 8.30% from 18 to 24, 26.70% from 25 to 44, 23.50% from 45 to 64, and 16.10% 65 or older. The median age was 38 years. For every 100 females there were 94.40 males. For every 100 females age 18 and over, there were 91.50 males.

The median household income was $31,209 and the median family income was $38,179. Males had a median income of $28,199 versus $20,134 for females. The per capita income for the county was $16,056. About 12.20% of families and 16.10% of the population were below the poverty line, including 21.90% of those under age 18 and 13.10% of those age 65 or over.

== Government and politics ==
=== Government & Local Politics ===
The county government is a constitutional body granted specific powers by the Constitution of Arkansas and the Arkansas Code. The quorum court is the legislative branch of the county government and controls all spending and revenue collection. Representatives are called justices of the peace and are elected from county districts every even-numbered year. The number of districts in a county vary from nine to fifteen, and district boundaries are drawn by the county election commission. The Conway County Quorum Court has eleven members. Presiding over quorum court meetings is the county judge, who serves as the chief executive officer of the county. The county judge is elected at-large and does not vote in quorum court business, although capable of vetoing quorum court decisions.

Conway County, Arkansas Elected Countywide Officials
Position	Officeholder	Party
County Judge	Jimmy Hart	Independent
County Clerk	Kathy Kordsmeier	Republican
Circuit Clerk	Darlene Massingill	Republican
Sheriff	Mike Smith	Democratic
Treasurer	Carl Birkner	(Unknown)
Collector	Norbert Gunderman	Democratic
Assessor	Mark Stobaugh	Democratic
Coroner	Dennis B. Decker	Republican

The composition of the Quorum Court following the 2024 elections is 7 Republicans and 4 Democrats. Justices of the Peace (members) of the Quorum Court following the elections are:

- District 1: Philip Hoyt (D) of Perry.
- District 2: Patrick Hartman (R) of Hattieville.
- District 3: Steven Davenport (R) of Cleveland.
- District 4: Thomas A. Flowers (D) of Center Ridge.
- District 5: Keith Long (R) of Solgohachia.
- District 6: Brigham Jones (R) of Morrilton.
- District 7: Johnathan Ray Trafford (R) of Morrilton.
- District 8: Michael Hammons (D) of Morrilton.
- District 9: John David Trafford Jr. (R) of Morrilton.
- District 10: Leslie Griffiths (R) of Morrilton.
- District 11: Jimmy Miller (D) of Plumerville.

Additionally, the townships of Conway County are entitled to elect their own respective constables, as set forth by the Constitution of Arkansas. Constables are largely of historical significance as they were used to keep the peace in rural areas when travel was more difficult. The township constables as of the 2024 elections are:

- Cedar Falls: Thomas William Barber (D)
- Griffin: Alex Campbell (R)
- Washington: John Gordon (R)
- Welbourne: Shane Engebrecht (R)

=== Federal Politics ===
United States presidential election results for Conway County, Arkansas
Year	Republican		Democratic		Third party(ies)	
Year	No.	%	No.	%	No.	%
1836	48	67.61%	23	32.39%	0	0.00%
1840	177	46.83%	201	53.17%	0	0.00%
1844	167	36.70%	288	63.30%	0	0.00%
1848	149	46.56%	171	53.44%	0	0.00%
1852	110	29.81%	259	70.19%	0	0.00%
1856	0	0.00%	408	73.51%	147	26.49%
1860	0	0.00%	52	5.61%	875	94.39%
1868	434	58.41%	309	41.59%	0	0.00%
1872	150	38.46%	240	61.54%	0	0.00%
1876	556	41.87%	772	58.13%	0	0.00%
1880	1,020	52.85%	908	47.05%	2	0.10%
1884	1,433	56.17%	1,118	43.83%	0	0.00%
1888	1,280	47.15%	1,360	50.09%	75	2.76%
1892	731	31.63%	1,284	55.56%	296	12.81%
1896	656	22.40%	2,255	76.99%	18	0.61%
1900	805	32.72%	1,635	66.46%	20	0.81%
1904	937	36.80%	1,572	61.74%	37	1.45%
1908	818	24.04%	2,533	74.43%	52	1.53%
1912	527	22.15%	1,435	60.32%	417	17.53%
1916	1,032	42.42%	1,401	57.58%	0	0.00%
1920	1,243	40.48%	1,791	58.32%	37	1.20%
1924	526	33.72%	909	58.27%	125	8.01%
1928	665	30.48%	1,514	69.39%	3	0.14%
1932	285	10.05%	2,530	89.24%	20	0.71%
1936	305	13.15%	2,013	86.77%	2	0.09%
1940	272	11.62%	2,067	88.33%	1	0.04%
1944	639	28.77%	1,579	71.09%	3	0.14%
1948	425	17.32%	1,771	72.17%	258	10.51%
1952	2,133	40.12%	3,174	59.70%	10	0.19%
1956	1,636	38.22%	2,618	61.15%	27	0.63%
1960	1,685	35.13%	2,900	60.47%	211	4.40%
1964	2,378	36.02%	4,205	63.69%	19	0.29%
1968	1,973	30.40%	2,560	39.44%	1,958	30.16%
1972	4,187	58.11%	3,009	41.76%	9	0.12%
1976	2,177	25.23%	6,443	74.67%	9	0.10%
1980	4,145	45.11%	4,698	51.13%	346	3.77%
1984	5,049	57.14%	3,742	42.35%	45	0.51%
1988	4,066	49.35%	4,134	50.18%	39	0.47%
1992	2,719	32.06%	4,898	57.75%	864	10.19%
1996	2,307	31.68%	4,055	55.69%	920	12.63%
2000	3,545	49.00%	3,496	48.33%	193	2.67%
2004	4,009	49.59%	3,982	49.26%	93	1.15%
2008	4,691	57.64%	3,149	38.70%	298	3.66%
2012	4,514	58.40%	3,005	38.87%	211	2.73%
2016	4,849	61.17%	2,656	33.51%	422	5.32%
2020	5,694	65.56%	2,615	30.11%	376	4.33%
2024	5,893	69.00%	2,449	28.67%	199	2.33%

For the bulk of the 20th century, Conway County was reliably Democratic, voting solidly for the party in every presidential election except for the 1972 and 1984 landslides of Richard Nixon and Ronald Reagan, respectively. Former Governor Bill Clinton won the county twice in his 1992 and 1996 victories while comfortably sweeping his native Arkansas.

As is the case with most rural counties as well as the state of Arkansas as a whole since the turn of the millennium, Conway County has turned sharply rightward and away from a more socially liberal Democratic Party than the one Clinton led. Though Republican George W. Bush won the county by less than 1% in 2000 and 2004, both Conway County and Arkansas would become safely red at the presidential level starting in 2008

== Communities ==
=== Cities ===
- Morrilton (county seat)
- Oppelo
- Plumerville

=== Town ===
- Menifee

=== Census-designated places ===
- Center Ridge
- Hattieville
- Jerusalem
- Springfield

=== Other unincorporated communities ===
- Blackwell
- Cleveland
- Formosa
- Jerusalem
- Lanty
- Mount Olive
- Pleasant Hill
- Pontoon
- Solgohachia
- Winrock

=== Townships ===
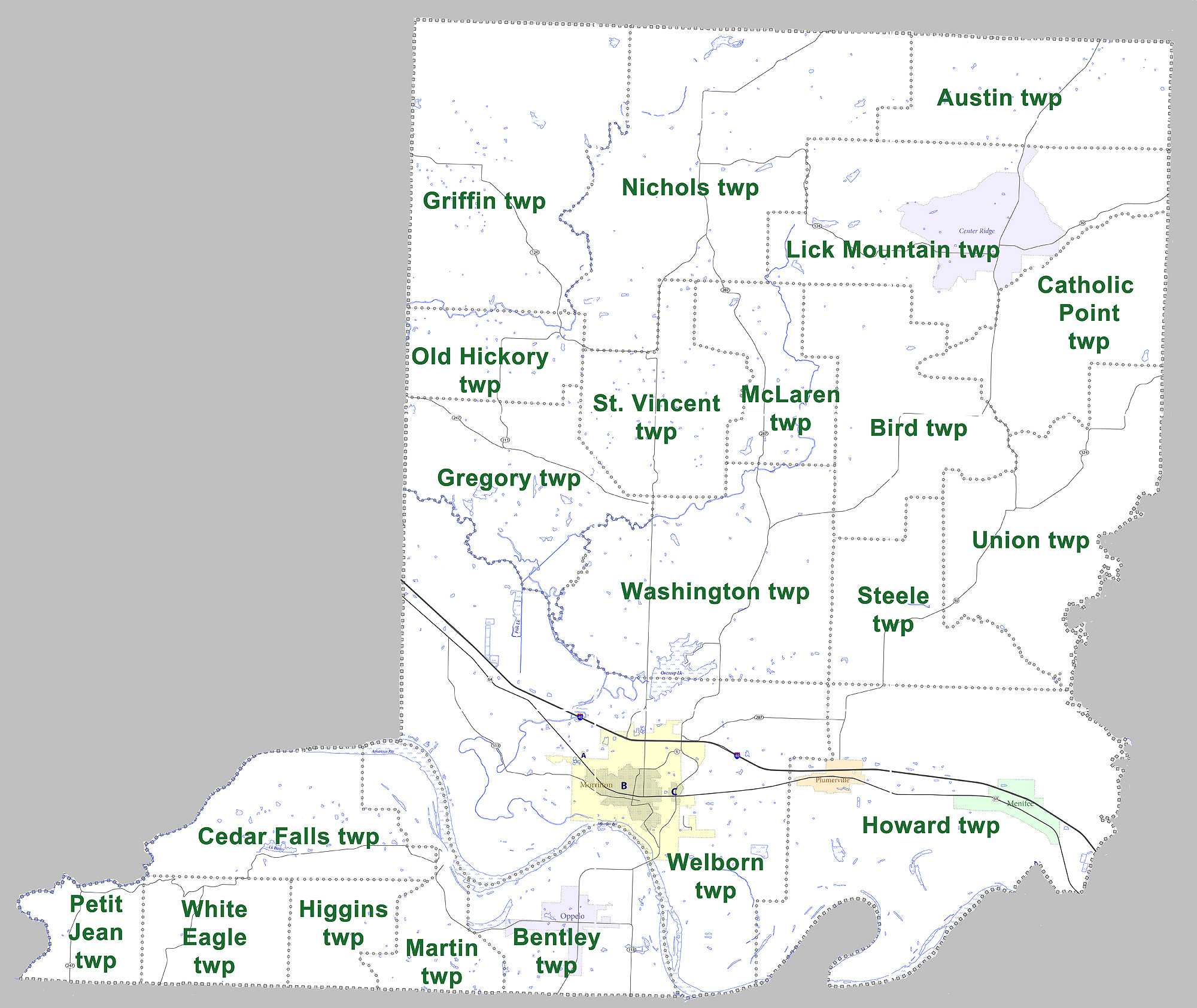
Townships in Conway County, Arkansas as of 2010

Townships in Arkansas are the divisions of a county. Each township includes unincorporated areas; some may have incorporated cities or towns within part of their boundaries. Arkansas townships have limited purposes in modern times. However, the United States census does list Arkansas population based on townships (sometimes referred to as "county subdivisions" or "minor civil divisions"). Townships are also of value for historical purposes in terms of genealogical research. Each town or city is within one or more townships in an Arkansas county based on census maps and publications. The townships of Conway County are listed below; listed in parentheses are the cities, towns, and/or census-designated places that are fully or partially inside the township.

- Austin
- Bentley (Oppelo)
- Bird
- Catholic Point
- Cedar Falls
- Gregory
- Griffin
- Higgins
- Howard (Menifee, Plumerville)
- Lick Mountain (CDP Center Ridge)
- Martin
- McLaren
- Nichols
- Old Hickory
- Petit Jean
- St. Vincent
- Steele
- Union
- Washington
- Welborn (Morrilton)
- White Eagle

== Infrastructure ==
=== Major highways ===
- I-40
- US 64
- AR 9
- AR 92
- AR 95
- AR 113
- AR 124
- AR 132
- AR 154
- AR 155
- AR 213
- AR 247
- AR 287
- AR 915
- AR 980

== See also ==
- David J. Sanders, state senator who represents Conway County
- National Register of Historic Places listings in Conway County, Arkansas
- "Wolverton Mountain", country song based on a story from Woolverton Mountain in Conway County
