= National Register of Historic Places listings in Scott County, Arkansas =

Location of Scott County in Arkansas

This is a list of the National Register of Historic Places listings in Scott County, Arkansas.

This is intended to be a complete list of the properties and districts on the National Register of Historic Places in Scott County, Arkansas, United States. The locations of National Register properties and districts for which the latitude and longitude coordinates are included below, may be seen in a map.

There are 14 properties and districts listed on the National Register in the county.

Contents: Counties in Arkansas
- Arkansas
- Ashley
- Baxter
- Benton
- Boone
- Bradley
- Calhoun
- Carroll
- Chicot
- Clark
- Clay
- Cleburne
- Cleveland
- Columbia
- Conway
- Craighead
- Crawford
- Crittenden
- Cross
- Dallas
- Desha
- Drew
- Faulkner
- Franklin
- Fulton
- Garland
- Grant
- Greene
- Hempstead
- Hot Spring
- Howard
- Independence
- Izard
- Jackson
- Jefferson
- Johnson
- Lafayette
- Lawrence
- Lee
- Lincoln
- Little River
- Logan
- Lonoke
- Madison
- Marion
- Miller
- Mississippi
- Monroe
- Montgomery
- Nevada
- Newton
- Ouachita
- Perry
- Phillips
- Pike
- Poinsett
- Polk
- Pope
- Prairie
- Pulaski (Little Rock)
- Randolph
- St. Francis
- Saline
- Scott
- Searcy
- Sebastian
- Sevier
- Sharp
- Stone
- Union
- Van Buren
- Washington
- White
- Woodruff
- Yell

This National Park Service list is complete through NPS recent listings posted September 4, 2026.

== Current listings ==
	Name on the Register	Image	Date listed	Location	City or town	Description
1	Bates School	Bates School	February 21, 2006 (#06000081)	1074 Bates School Rd. 34°54′24″N 94°22′53″W	Bates	
2	Cold Spring	Cold Spring	October 21, 1993 (#93001082)	County Road 93 northeast of Waldron in the Ouachita National Forest; 34°57′39″N 93°53′31″W	Waldron	
3	Dooley Dipping Vat		June 7, 2006 (#06000466)	Off Dooley Rd. east of Forest Service Road 925; 34°46′00″N 94°01′10″W	Boles	
4	C.E. Forrester House	C.E. Forrester House	September 3, 1998 (#98001127)	140 Danville Rd. 34°53′55″N 94°05′02″W	Waldron	
5	Mount Pleasant Methodist Church	Mount Pleasant Methodist Church	June 5, 1986 (#86001207)	Highway 248; 34°55′22″N 94°01′26″W	Waldron	
6	Parks School	Parks School	June 6, 2002 (#02000602)	Highway 28; 34°48′11″N 93°57′34″W	Parks	
7	Poteau Work Center	Poteau Work Center	October 20, 1993 (#93001094)	Poteau Work Center access road off Highway 80; 34°53′40″N 94°04′06″W	Waldron	
8	Poteau Work Center Residence No. 2	Poteau Work Center Residence No. 2	October 20, 1993 (#93001095)	Poteau Work Center access road off Highway 80; 34°53′41″N 94°04′09″W	Waldron	
9	Powder Magazine	Powder Magazine	October 20, 1993 (#93001096)	County Road 96 north of Blue Ball, Ouachita National Forest; 35°00′08″N 93°43′07″W	Blue Ball	
10	Scott City County Jail, (Old)	Scott City County Jail, (Old)	May 16, 2002 (#02000486)	125 W. 2nd St. 34°53′56″N 94°05′29″W	Waldron	
11	Scott County Courthouse	Scott County Courthouse	November 13, 1989 (#89001971)	Courthouse Square; 34°53′57″N 94°05′30″W	Waldron	
12	Square Rock Dipping Vat		June 7, 2006 (#06000464)	Northwest of the junction of Forest Service Roads 296 and 565A; 34°57′32″N 93°59′42″W	Waldron	
13	Waldron Commercial Historic District	Waldron Commercial Historic District	September 25, 2008 (#08000943)	S. Main St. between 1st and 5th Sts. and Washington St. between 2nd and 3rd Sts. 34°53′57″N 94°05′28″W	Waldron	
14	Waldron School Historic District	Waldron School Historic District	September 27, 2019 (#100004437)	403 and 429 W. 5th St. 34°53′51″N 94°05′45″W	Waldron	

== Former listings ==
	Name on the Register	Image	Date listed	Date removed	Location	City or town	Description
1	John T. Forrester House		December 8, 1980 (#80000786)	October 18, 2002	115 Danville Street	Waldron	

== See also ==
- List of National Historic Landmarks in Arkansas
- National Register of Historic Places listings in Arkansas
