= List of places in Arkansas: N =

Arkansas State Seal

This list of current cities, towns, unincorporated communities, and other recognized places in the U.S. state of Arkansas whose name begins with the letter N. It also includes information on the number and names of counties in which the place lies, and its lower and upper zip code bounds, if applicable.

== Cities and Towns ==
Name of place	Number of counties	Principal county	Lower zip code	Upper zip code
Nady	1	Arkansas County	72166	
Nail	1	Newton County	72628	
Nalle	1	Craighead County		
Nance	1	Saline County		
Nance Ford	1	Grant County		
Nasco	1	Izard County		
Nasco Spur	1	Izard County		
Nashville	1	Howard County	71852	
Nathan	1	Pike County	71852	
National	1	Hot Spring County		
Natural Dam	1	Crawford County	72948	
Natural Steps	1	Pulaski County	72135	
Naylor	1	Faulkner County	72173	
Neal Springs	1	Sevier County	71842	
Nebo	1	Benton County		
Nebo	1	Lincoln County	71667	
Needham	1	Craighead County	72437	
Needmore	1	Izard County		
Needmore	1	Scott County	72958	
Neely	1	Yell County	72834	
Negro Head Corner	1	Woodruff County		
Nella	1	Scott County	71953	
Nelsonville	1	Sharp County	72569	
Nemo	1	Craighead County		
Nettleton	1	Craighead County	72401	
Neuhardt	1	Crittenden County		
Nevark	1	Nevada County		
Newark	1	Independence County	72562	
New Augusta	1	Woodruff County	72006	
New Blaine	1	Logan County	72851	
Newburg	1	Izard County	72556	
New Caledonia	1	Union County	71749	
Newcastle	1	St. Francis County	72335	
New Dixie	1	Perry County	72016	
New Edinburg	1	Cleveland County	71660	
Newell	1	Union County	71730	
New Gascony	1	Jefferson County	72004	
New Haroldton	1	Crawford County		
New Hope	1	Boone County		
New Hope	1	Dallas County		
New Hope	1	Drew County	71655	
New Hope	1	Greene County		
New Hope	1	Independence County	72501	
Newhope	1	Pike County	71959	
New Hope	1	Pope County	72801	
New Hope	1	Union County		
New Jenny Lind	1	Sebastian County		
New London	1	Union County	71765	
Newnata	1	Stone County	72680	
New Neely	1	Yell County		
Newport	1	Calhoun County		
Newport	1	Jackson County	72112	
New Rocky Comfort	1	Little River County	71836	
New Salme	1	Woodruff County	72006	
New Spadra	1	Johnson County	72830	
New Summit	1	Saline County	72011	
New Town	1	Crawford County	72921	
Newtown	1	Jefferson County	72004	
Nick Springs	1	Union County		
Nimmo	1	White County		
Nimmons	1	Clay County	72461	
Nimrod	1	Perry County	72126	
Ninetysix Corner	1	Crittenden County		
Noahs	1	Searcy County		
Noble Lake	1	Jefferson County	71601	
Nodena	1	Mississippi County	72395	
Nogal	1	Perry County		
Nogo	1	Pope County		
Nola	1	Scott County	72838	
Noland	1	Randolph County	72455	
Norden	1	Mississippi County		
Norfork	1	Baxter County	72658	
Norman	1	Montgomery County	71960	
Norphlet	1	Union County	71759	
Norristown	1	Pope County	72801	
North	1	Ashley County	71635	
North Bingen	1	Hempstead County	71852	
North Boothe	1	Scott County	72927	
North Brinkley	1	Monroe County	72021	
North Cedar	1	Jefferson County	71601	
North Crossett	1	Ashley County	71635	
North Dardanelle	1	Pope County	72834	
Northern Ohio	1	Poinsett County	72365	
North Heights	1	Miller County	75502	
North Hughes	1	St. Francis County	72348	
North Lewisville	1	Lafayette County	71845	
North Lexa	1	Phillips County		
North Little Rock	1	Pulaski County	72100	72120
North Pitts	1	Poinsett County	72421	
Northpoint	1	Pulaski County	72135	
North Rural Branch	1	Ashley County		
North Stuttgart	1	Arkansas County		
Norvell	1	Crittenden County	72331	
Noxburn	1	Greene County		
Noxobe	1	Columbia County		
Nuckles	1	Jackson County		
Nugulf	1	Union County		
Number Nine	1	Mississippi County	72319	
Nunley	1	Polk County	71953	
Nutts	1	Pike County		

== Townships ==
Name of place	Number of counties	Principal county	Lower zip code	Upper zip code
Nashville Township	1	Howard County		
Neal Township	1	Mississippi County		
Nelson Township	1	Clay County		
Nettleton Township	1	Craighead County		
Newburg Township	1	Izard County		
Newcomb Township	1	Saline County		
New Hope Township	1	Izard County		
New Tennessee Township	1	Perry County		
Newton Township	1	Faulkner County		
Nichols Township	1	Conway County		
Niven Township	1	Cleveland County		
Niven Township	1	Jefferson County		
Nix Township	1	Dallas County		
Noland Township	1	Hempstead County		
Norman Township	1	Montgomery County		
Norphlet Township	1	Union County		
North Big Rock Township	1	Sharp County		
North Fork Township	1	Baxter County		
North Fork Township	1	Marion County		
North Harrison Township	1	Boone County		
North Joe Burleson Township	1	Marion County		
North Lebanon Township	1	Sharp County		
North Tomahawk Township	1	Searcy County		
North Union Township	1	Sharp County		
Northwest Township	1	Stone County		
North Yocum Township	1	Carroll County		
