= Arkansas Highway 28 =

State highway in Arkansas, United States

Highway 28

Route information
- Maintained by ArDOT
- Existed: 1926–present

Section 1
- Length: 20.45 mi (32.91 km)
- West end: SH-128 at the Oklahoma state line near Bates
- East end: US 71 near Waldron

Section 2
- Length: 43.78 mi (70.46 km)
- West end: US 71 at Needmore
- East end: AR 27 at Rover

Section 3
- Length: 10.67 mi (17.17 km)
- West end: AR 27 near Rover
- East end: AR 7 / AR 10 in Ola

Section 4
- Length: 9.00 mi (14.48 km)
- West end: AR 154 at Mt. George
- East end: AR 7 in Dardanelle

Location
- Country: United States
- State: Arkansas
- Counties: Scott, Yell

Highway system
- Arkansas Highway System; Interstate; US; State; Business; Spurs; Suffixed; Scenic; Heritage
← AR 27	→ AR 29

Arkansas Highway 28 (AR 28) is a designation for four state highways in west Arkansas. One segment of 20.45 miles (32.91 km) runs from the Oklahoma state line east to U.S. Route 71 (US 71) north of Waldron. A second segment of 43.78 miles (70.46 km) runs from US 71 at Needmore east to Highway 27 at Rover. A third segment of 10.67 miles (17.17 km) runs from Highway 27 north of Rover east to Highway 10 in Ola. A fourth segment of 9.00 miles (14.48 km) runs from Highway 154 at Mt. George east to Highway 7 in Dardanelle. All four highways are rural, two-lane roads with relatively low traffic serving a sparsely populated and forested part of Arkansas. The highways are maintained by the Arkansas Department of Transportation (ARDOT).

== Route description ==
=== Oklahoma to Waldron ===
Highway 28 begins at the Oklahoma state line as a continuation of OK-128 and runs east, following an ecoregion boundary between the flat Arkansas River Valley and the Ouachita Mountains, as well as the Arkansas Southern Railroad tracks. The route runs east as a two-lane road through the Ouachita National Forest in a sparsely populated segment of oak-hickory-pine forest. Highway 28 passes the historic Bates School, listed on the National Register of Historic Places. The route continues east through Cauthron and Oliver before emerging from the Ouachita National Forest near Hon. In Hon, Highway 28 serves as the western terminus of Highway 80, before continuing east to US 71, where it terminates north of Waldron.

=== Needmore to Rover ===
The route begins at US 71 at Needmore in the Fourche Mountains south of Waldron in Scott County. The two-lane highway runs east along the long, east-west forested ridges of the Ouachita Mountains to Parks, where it passes the NRHP-listed Parks School. Continuing east, Highway 28 enters the Ouachita National Forest, bridges the Fourche La Fave River twice, and passes the unincorporated communities of Harvey and Nola before leaving the Ouachita National Forest and entering Yell County.

Entering in the southwestern part of Yell County, the route continues east through Gravelly and another crossing of the Fourche La Fave River before an intersection with Highway 307 at Bluffton. Highway 28 turns northeast and runs through Fourche Valley to Briggsville, where there is another intersection with Highway 307. The route begins skirting the edge of the Ouachita National Forest, passing through Wing to Highway 27 at Rover, where it terminates.

=== Rover to Ola ===
The route begins at Highway 27 north of Rover and runs east toward Plainview. Entering the city as Main Street, Highway 28 passes the former Plainview-Rover High School, post office, city hall, and the Plainview Medical Clinic before intersecting Highway 60 (Spring Avenue). The route turns northward at this junction, leaving Plainview and passing through a rural area before entering the small city of Ola. Entering from the city's southwest corner, Highway 28 passes Lake Ola-Dale before coming to an intersection with Highway 7 and Highway 10, where it terminates.

=== Mt. George to Dardanelle ===
The route begins in eastern Yell County at Mt. George at an intersection with Highway 154 near the Petit Jean River Wildlife Management Area. The two-lane road runs northeast through the unincorporated community of Pigsah and rural areas to Dardanelle, the Yell County seat. Highway 28 runs along the city limits near Dardanelle High School before terminating at an intersection with Highway 7.

== History ==
During the 1926 Arkansas state highway numbering, State Road 28 was designated from Oklahoma to Ola, largely along the present-day route, with a gap along US 71. The Highway 28 designation was duplicated when the Arkansas State Highway Commission designated a county road between Mount George and Dardanelle as a state highway on April 24, 1963. The Highway Commission initially sought to close the gap in Highway 28 around Waldron in May 1973 when a new location US 71 was being constructed around the city, but two months later rescinded the order and designated the former US 71 through Waldron as US 71B instead.

== Major intersections ==
County	Location	mi	km	Destinations	Notes
Scott	Coaldale	0.00	0.00	SH-128 west – Heavener	Continuation into Oklahoma
Scott	Hon	15.89	25.57	AR 80 east – Waldron	Western terminus of AR 80
Scott				I-49 – Texarkana, Fort Smith	Proposed; future exit 160 on I-49
Scott		20.45	32.91	US 71 – Fort Smith, Waldron	Eastern terminus
Scott	Gap in route				
Scott	Needmore	0.00	0.00	US 71 – Mena, Waldron	Western terminus
Yell	Bluffton	31.54	50.76	AR 307 north	Southern terminus of AR 307
Yell	Briggsville	38.34	61.70	AR 307 south	Northern terminus of AR 307
Yell	Rover	43.78	70.46	AR 27 – Danville, Onyx	Eastern terminus
Yell	Gap in route				
Yell		0.00	0.00	AR 27 – Danville, Onyx	Western terminus
Yell	Plainview	5.68	9.14	AR 60 east (Springs Avenue) – Nimrod Lake, Hot Springs	Western terminus of AR 60
Yell	Ola	10.67	17.17	AR 7 south – Hot Springs, Nimrod Dam	Western end of AR 7 concurrency
Yell	Ola			AR 7 north / AR 10 – Russellville, Dardanelle, Little Rock, Booneville	Eastern terminus; eastern end of AR 7 concurrency
Yell	Gap in route				
Yell	Mount George	0.00	0.00	AR 154 – Centerville, Danville	Western terminus
Yell	Dardanelle	9.00	14.48	AR 7 – Dardanelle, Paris, Ola	Eastern terminus
1.000 mi = 1.609 km; 1.000 km = 0.621 mi: Concurrency terminus; Unopened

== Gallery ==
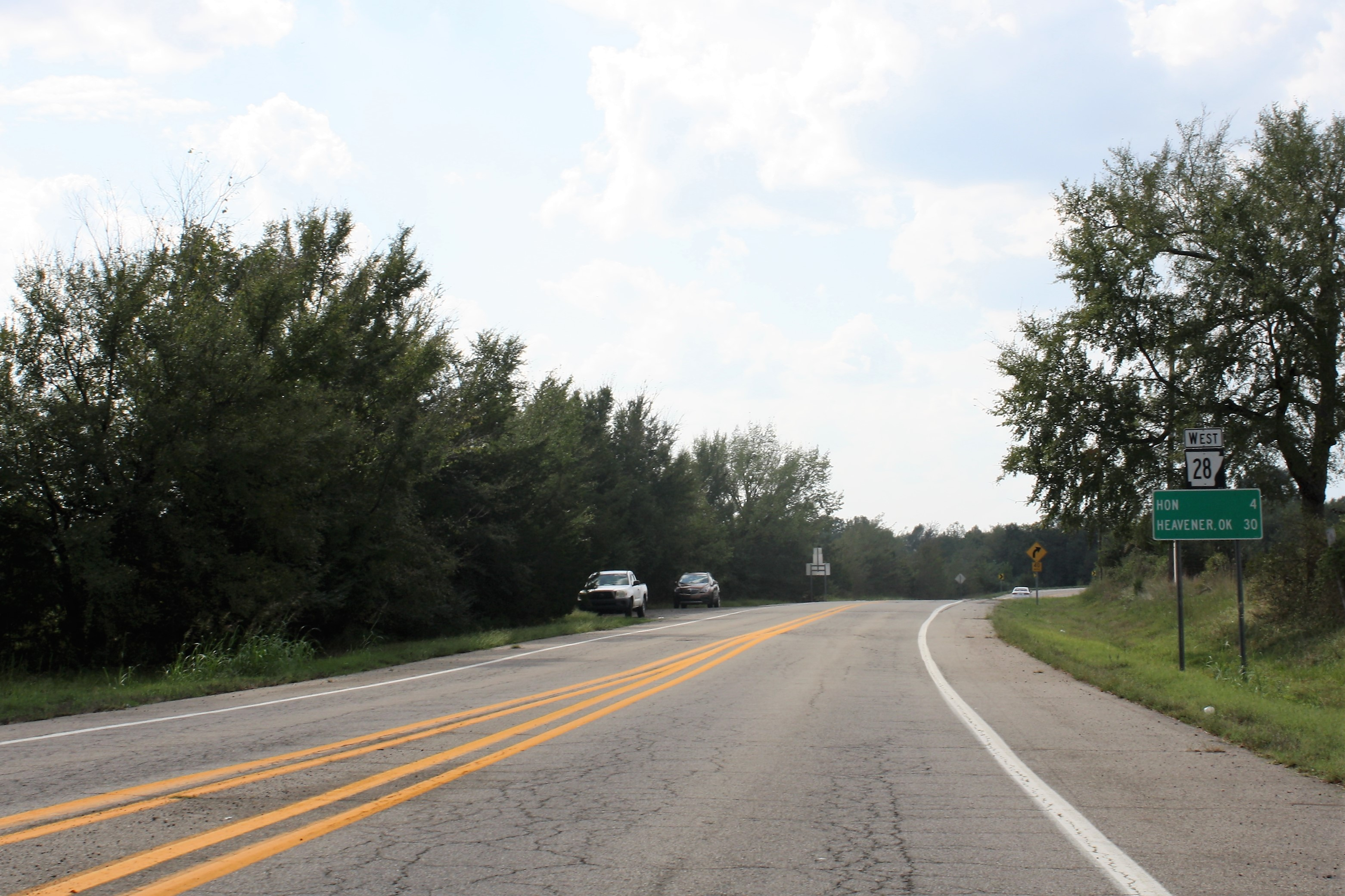
Eastern terminus north of Waldron

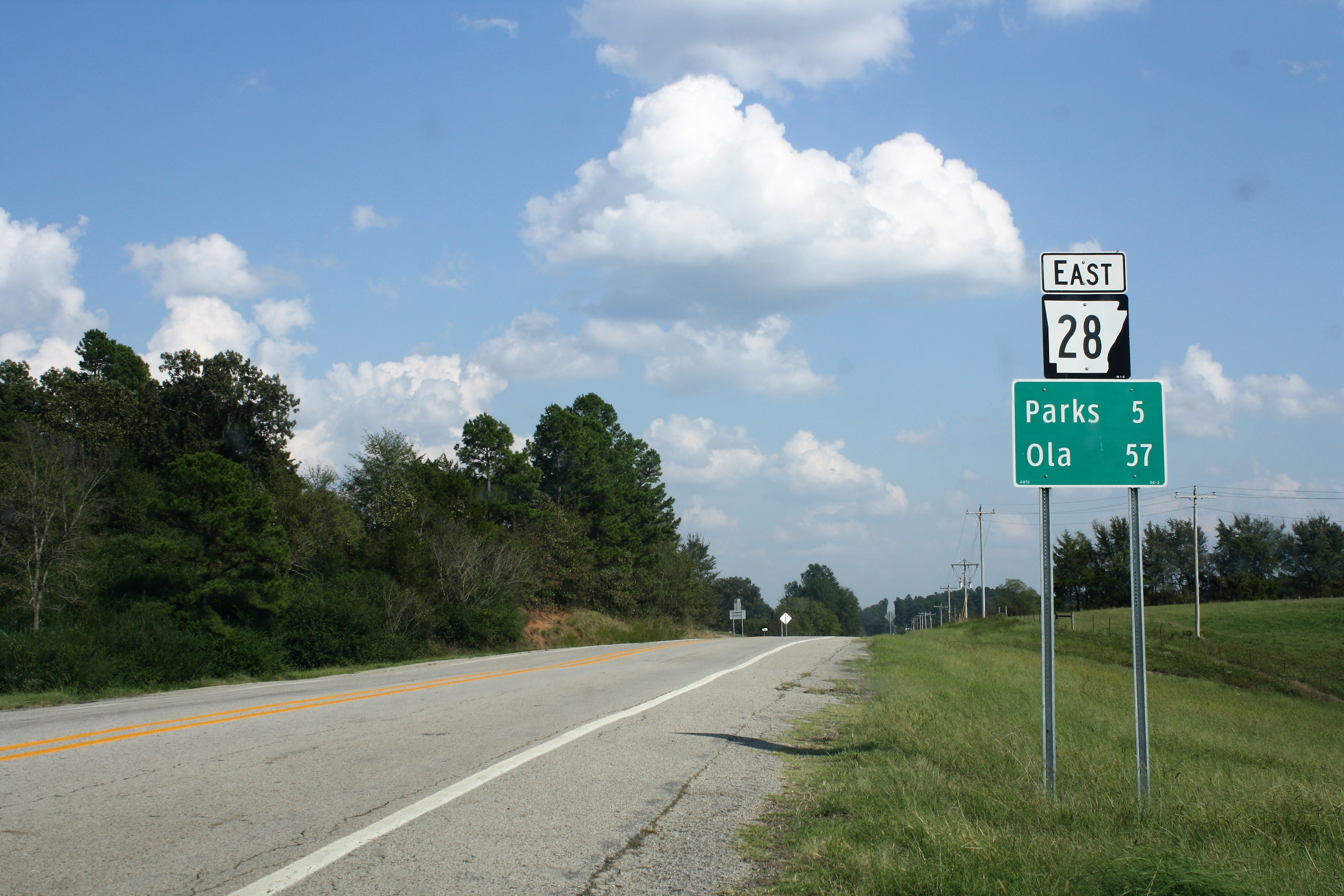
Western terminus at Needmore

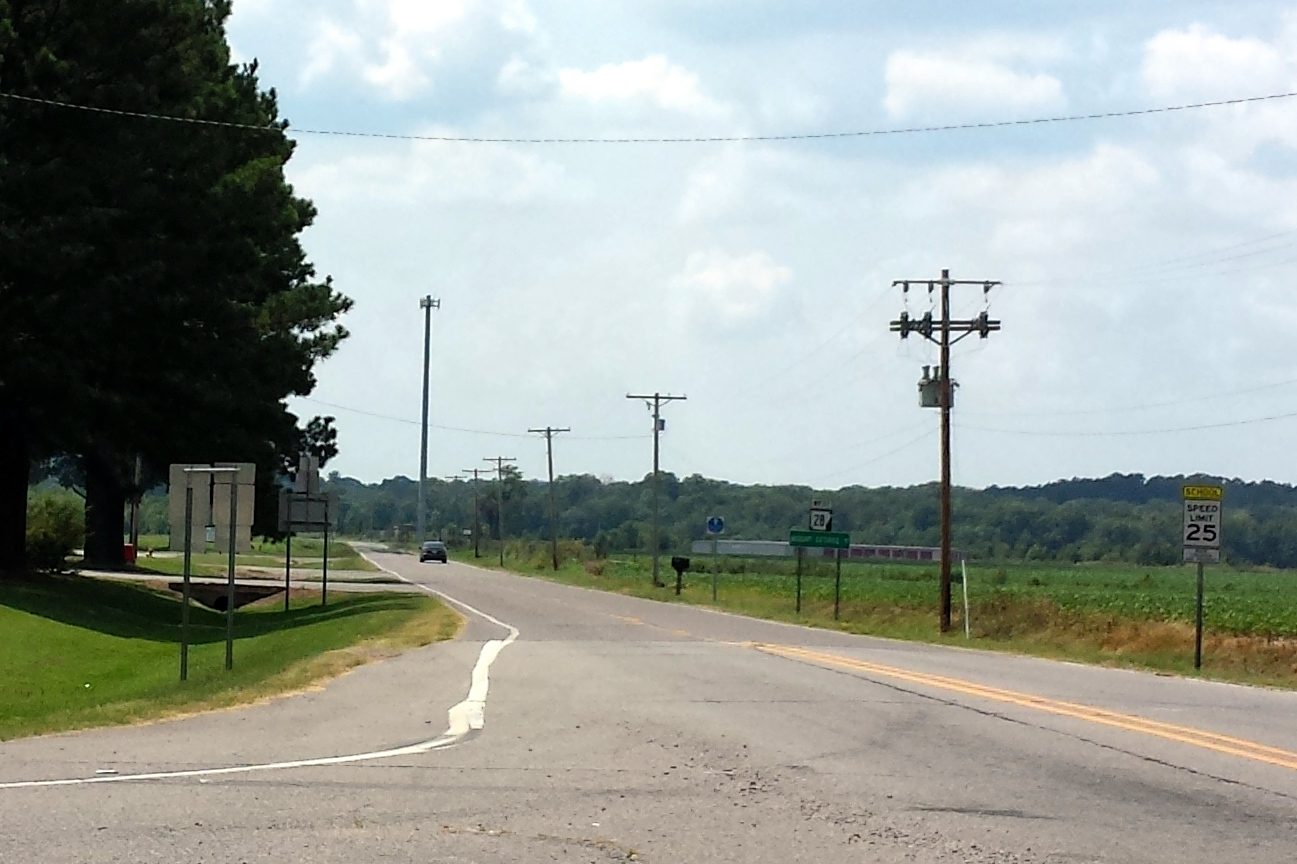
Eastern terminus in Dardanelle

== See also ==
- List of state highways in Arkansas
