= Evelyn Ammons =

American politician

Member of the Arkansas House of Representatives from the 16th district
- In office 1994–2000
- Preceded by: Bud Rice

Personal details
- Born: October 2, 1937 Scott County, Arkansas, US
- Died: January 28, 2017 (aged 79) Waldron, Arkansas, US
- Party: Democratic Party

Evelyn Ammons (October 2, 1937 – January 28, 2017) was an American politician. She served as a representative in the Arkansas House of Representatives from 1994 to 2000, on behalf of the Democratic Party. She was assistant speaker pro tem in 1996 and 1997.

== Early life ==
Ammons was born on October 2, 1937, in Scott County, Arkansas. Her parents were Omer Brian Ammons and Maud L. Gimlin Ammons, and she was the youngest of three sisters. Following the death of her father when she was eleven months old, her family moved in with her grandmother, Hattie Sedalia Nunn Gimlin. Her mother began work with the Works Progress Administration. While she was in the first grade, the family moved again to Waldron. She attended Waldron High School, where she was a member of the basketball team, a cheerleader, and involved with the Future Homemakers of America and the Beta Club. While in high school, she worked as a waitress, a summer hay hauler, and a switchboard operator before graduating in 1956. Following graduation, Ammons worked on upholstery paneling at the Waldron Furniture Manufacturing Company before becoming a secretary for the University of Arkansas Cooperative Extension Service at the Scott County Courthouse.

== Political career ==
Ammons ran as county and circuit clerk for Scott County in 1978, in a campaign run by her nephew Gary Ashford, the chair of the Scott County Democratic Committee. She was elected with 73 percent in the Democratic Party primary and then served in office from 1979 to 1994, running unopposed in all her subsequent elections. She decided to run for office as a representative in the Arkansas House of Representatives when Representative Bud Rice retired. She contested the 1994 election for the 16th district as a Democrat, receiving 49 percent in the primary and then winning the primary runoff with 57 percent. She beat the Republican opponent in the general election with 58 percent despite her seat being targeted by the chairman of the Republican Party of Arkansas, Asa Hutchinson. She was sworn into office at the Arkansas State Capitol, which was the first time she had been there.

She sponsored Act 986 of 1995, which changed the composition of the County and Circuit Clerks’ Continuing Education Board, and co-sponsored Act 431 of 1995, to require bidding by county governments for purchases over $10,000, and Act 962 of 1995, to allow state employees to purchase retirement credits for time lost while injured. She was generally politically aligned with Representative Ed Wilkerson and Representative Ode Maddox. She won the 1996 election against her Republican opponent, Bruce Campbell, receiving 5,592 votes in contrast to his 4,128. She was appointed assistant speaker pro tem for her second term by House Speaker Bobby Hogue, and served as a member of the Arkansas Tuition Trust Authority and the Natural Heritage Commission. She passed Act 833 of 1997, which made home buyers who had not owned a house within three years exempt from real estate transfer tax. She also fought for funding for rural water systems. She was chair of the Small Business Subcommittee of the Agriculture and Economic Development Committee and a member of the energy committee, the public transportation committee, the agriculture and economic development committee and the legislative audit committee in 1997 and 1998.

Ammons was challenged by the mayor of Waldron in the 1998 primary, although she won with 69 percent of the vote and was unopposed in the general election. She sponsored Act 800 of 1999, which provided funding for the refurbishment of Sodie Davidson Park in Waldron. She was a member of the Legislative Council, the Joint Interim Committee on Energy, the public health, welfare and labor committee, the insurance and commerce committee and the House management committee. She voted in favor of relocating the Ouachita Wilderness Institute, a medium-security juvenile facility, to Fort Chaffee. She unsuccessfully supported legislation to designate the Crooked Creek as an Extraordinary Resource Water, including requesting opinions from the Arkansas Attorney General on behalf of the Arkansas Game and Fish Commission to prevent commercial mining. She retired from the House of Representatives in 2000 as a result of term limits.

== Later life ==
Ammons was honored at a dinner by the Scott County Democratic Women after her retirement. She died on January 28, 2017, in Waldron.
