= Nebraska (disambiguation) =

Nebraska is a midwestern state in the central United States.

Nebraska may also refer to:

== Places ==
In Nebraska

- Nebraska City, Nebraska
- Nebraska National Forest

Elsewhere

- 10195 Nebraska, an asteroid
- Nebraska, Arkansas, a ghost town
- Nebraska, Indiana, an unincorporated place
- Nebraska, Michigan, a ghost town
- Nebraska, Ohio, a ghost town
- Nebraska, Los Angeles County, California
- Nebraska Township, Illinois, in Livingston County, Illinois
- Nebraska Township, Iowa, in Page County, Iowa
- South Nebraska, Tampa, Florida, a neighborhood

== Art, entertainment, and media ==
- Nebraska (film), a 2013 film by Alexander Payne
- Nebraska (album), by Bruce Springsteen
  - "Nebraska" (song), title track from the eponymous album
- "Nebraska" (The Walking Dead), an episode of the AMC television series The Walking Dead
- Nebraska (Dexter), an episode of the Showtime television series Dexter
- Nebraska (novel), a 1987 novel by George Whitmore

== Ships ==
- USS Nebraska (BB-14), a battleship, in commission 1907–1920
- USS Nebraska (SSBN-739), a submarine, in commission since 1993

== Other ==
- Nebraska Cornhuskers, the athletic program of the University of Nebraska–Lincoln
- University of Nebraska–Lincoln
