= Poteau Work Center Residence No. 2 =

Historic house in Arkansas, United States

- U.S. National Register of Historic Places
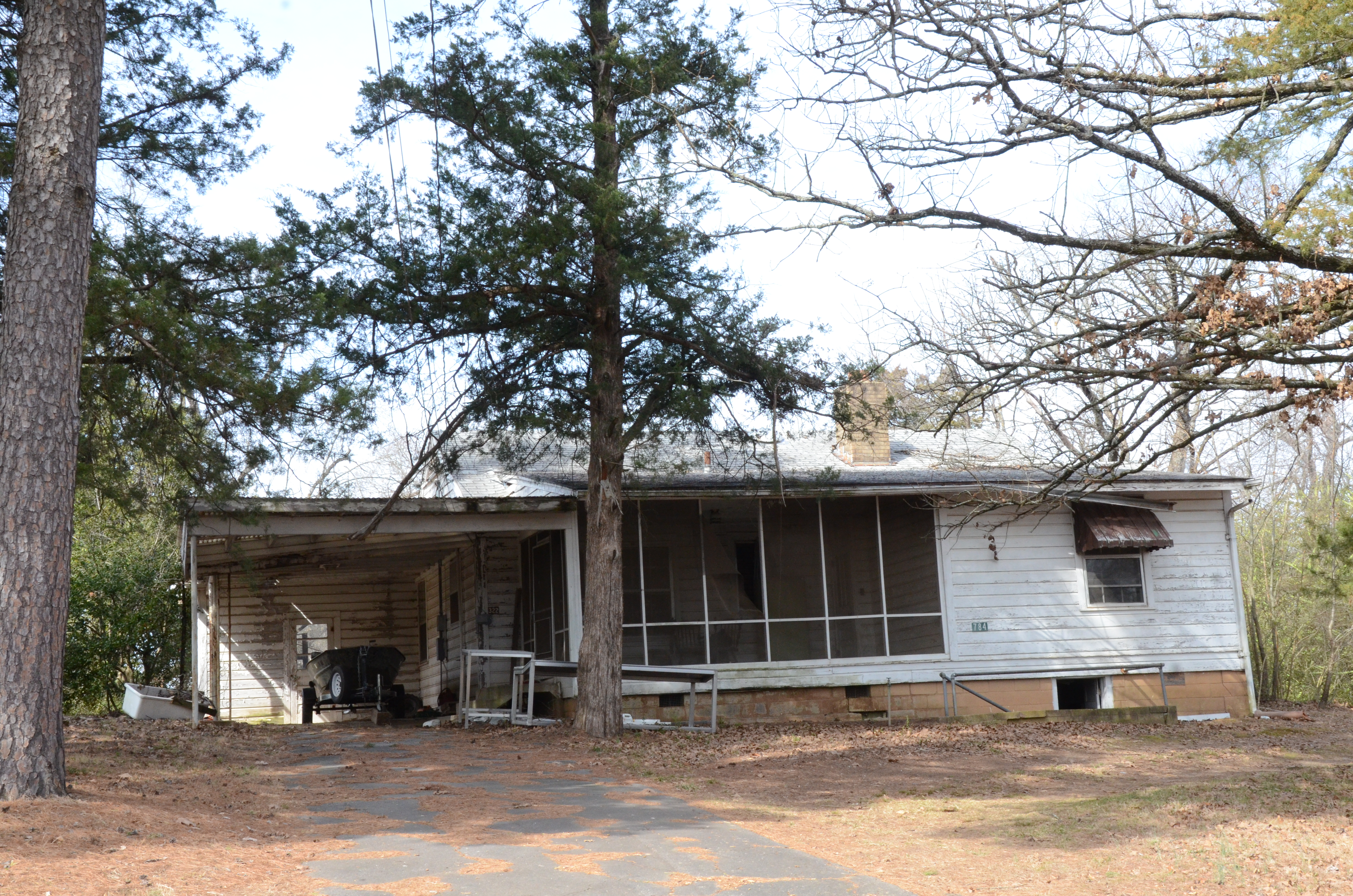

- Location within Arkansas Location within the United States
- Location: Poteau Work Center Access Rd., off AR 80, Waldron, Arkansas
- Coordinates: 34°53′41″N 94°4′9″W
- Area: less than one acre
- Built: 1939
- Built by: Civilian Conservation Corps
- MPS: Facilities Constructed by the CCC in Arkansas MPS
- NRHP reference No.: 93001095
- Added to NRHP: October 20, 1993

The Poteau Work Center Residence No. 2 is a historic house at the Poteau District Headquarters of the Ouachita National Forest in Waldron, Arkansas. It is a single-story wood-frame house, with a shallow-sloped gable roof and novelty siding. Its central entry is sheltered by a porch supported by trios of columns. The building was (along with the adjacent work center) built c. 1939 by a crew of the Civilian Conservation Corps.

The house was listed on the National Register of Historic Places in 1993.

== See also ==
- National Register of Historic Places listings in Scott County, Arkansas
