= Poteau Work Center =

- U.S. National Register of Historic Places
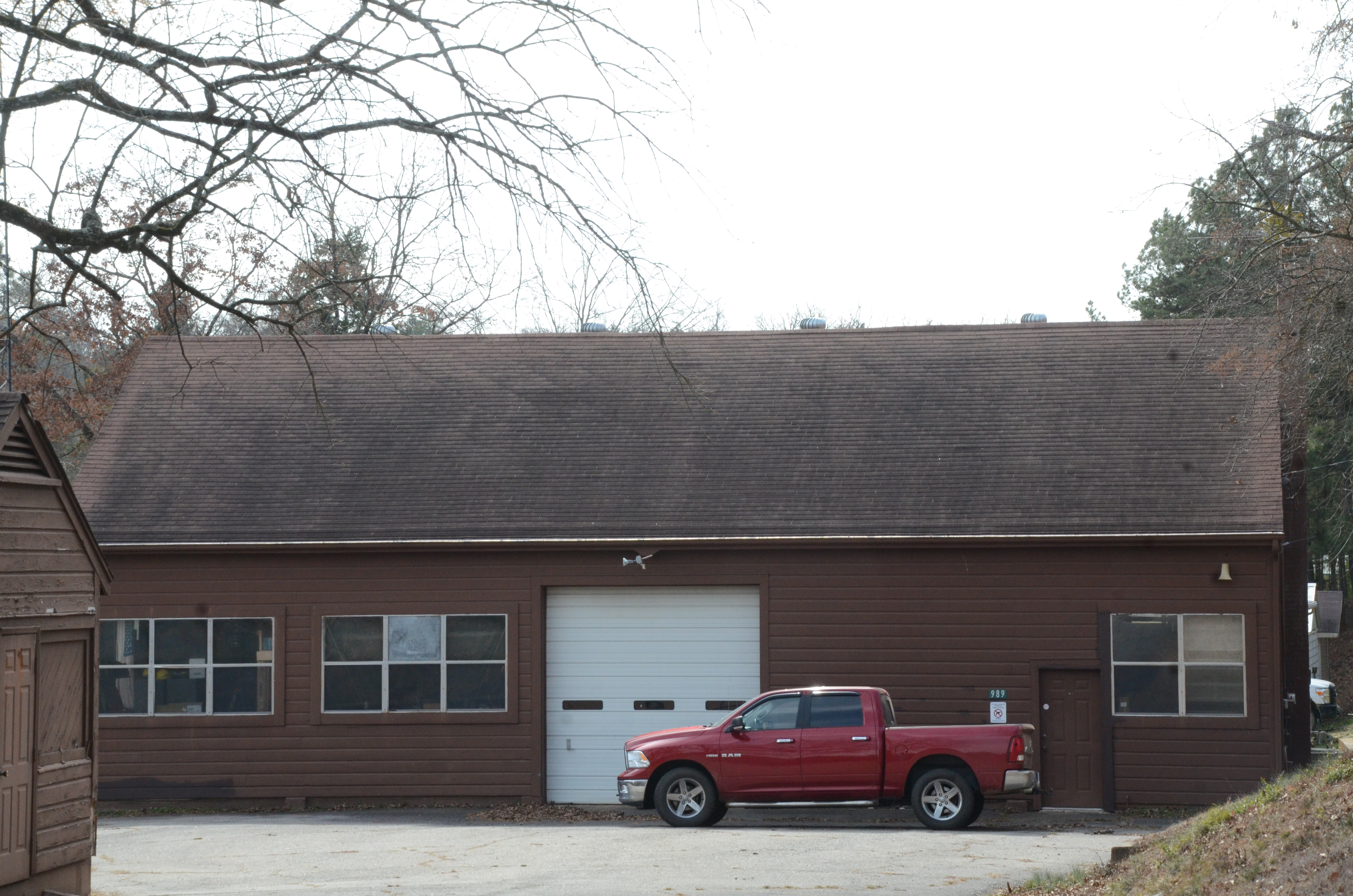

- Location within Arkansas Location within the United States
- Location: Poteau Work Center Access Rd., off AR 80, Waldron, Arkansas
- Coordinates: 34°53′40″N 94°4′6″W
- Area: less than one acre
- Built: 1939
- Built by: Civilian Conservation Corps
- MPS: Facilities Constructed by the CCC in Arkansas MPS
- NRHP reference No.: 93001094
- Added to NRHP: October 20, 1993

The Poteau Work Center is a utility building located at the Poteau District Headquarters of the Ouachita National Forest in Waldron, Arkansas. It is a rectangular single-story wood-frame building with gable roof, and is distinguished by centrally located garage doors on each of its long sides. The building was (along with the adjacent residence), constructed about 1939 by a work crew of the Civilian Conservation Corps.

The building was listed on the National Register of Historic Places in 1993.

== See also ==
- National Register of Historic Places listings in Scott County, Arkansas
