= Parks School =

- U.S. National Register of Historic Places
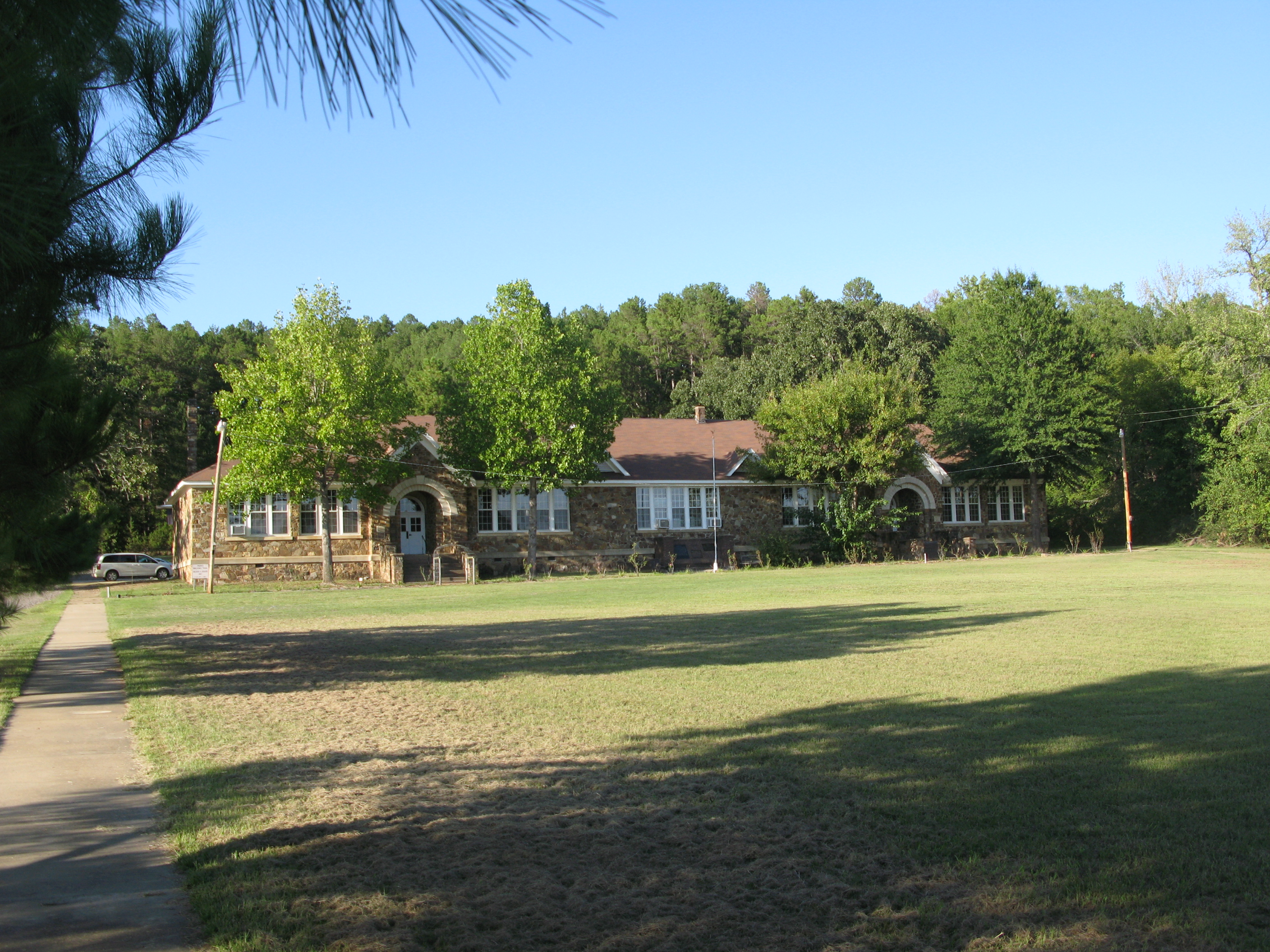

- Location within Arkansas Location within the United States
- Location: AR 28, Parks, Arkansas
- Coordinates: 34°48′11″N 93°57′34″W
- Area: 5 acres (2.0 ha)
- Built: 1940
- Built by: Works Progress Administration
- Architectural style: WPA
- NRHP reference No.: 02000602
- Added to NRHP: June 6, 2002

The Parks School is a historic former school building just north of Arkansas Highway 28 in the center of Parks, Arkansas. It is a single-story fieldstone structure, with a gable-on-hip roof, and several small gabled dormers on the long (south-facing) front facade. Two entrances are set in round-arch openings with keystones. The building has retained most of its original windows, doors, and other original hardware. It was built in 1940 with funding from the Works Progress Administration, and served as a school into the 1960s. It is now a local senior center.

The building was listed on the National Register of Historic Places in 2002.

== See also ==
- National Register of Historic Places listings in Scott County, Arkansas
