= Waldron Commercial Historic District =

Historic district in Arkansas, United States

- U.S. National Register of Historic Places
- U.S. Historic district
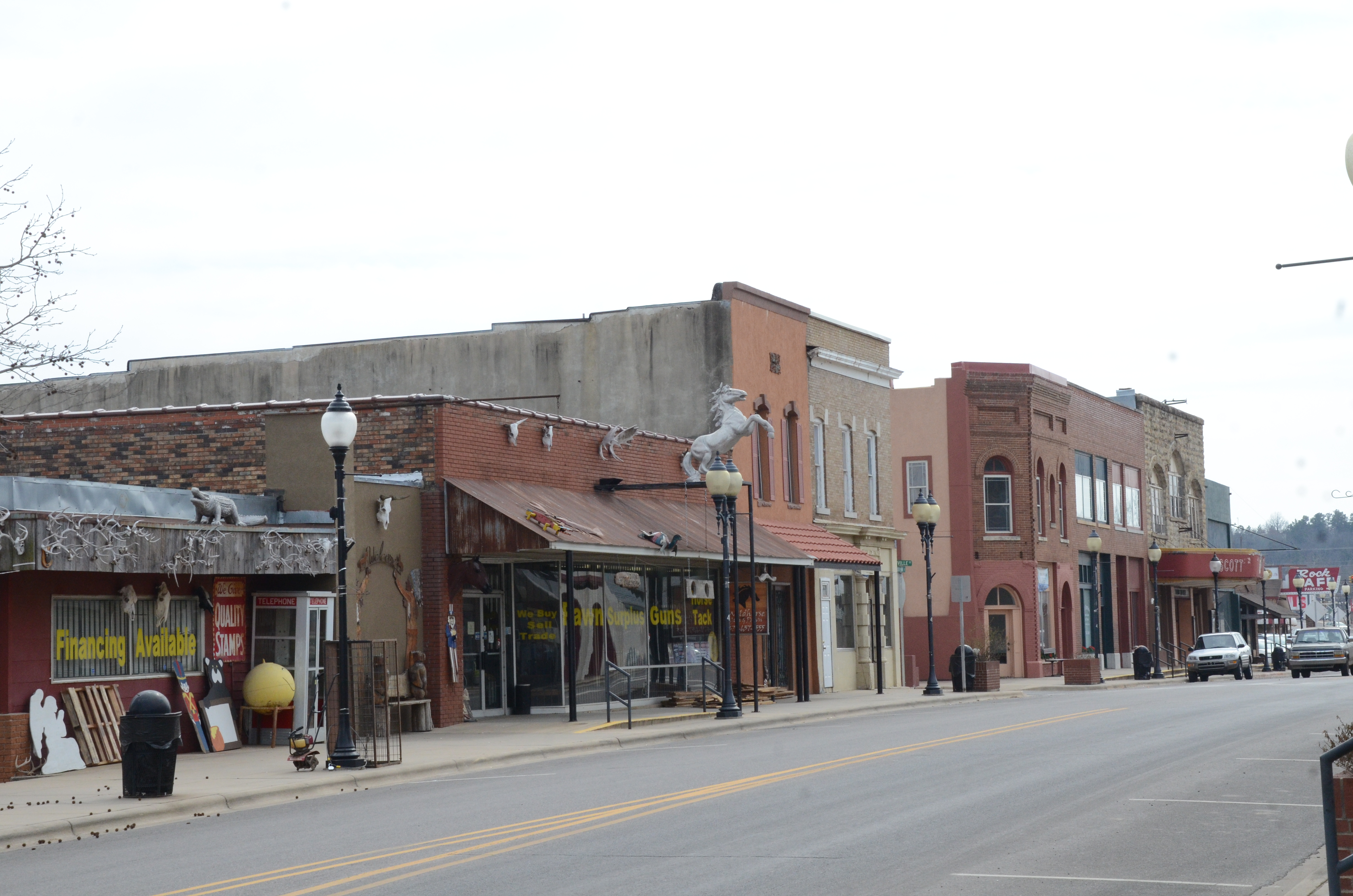

- Location within Arkansas Location within the United States
- Location: S. Main St. between 1st and 5th Sts., Washington St. between 2nd and 3rd Sts., Waldron, Arkansas
- Coordinates: 34.89907°N 94.09119°W
- Area: 12 acres (4.9 ha)
- Built: 1880
- Architect: Courier, Jim Henry
- Architectural style: Early Commercial, Italianate
- NRHP reference No.: 08000943
- Added to NRHP: September 25, 2008

The Waldron Commercial Historic District encompasses the historic central business district of Waldron, Arkansas. This area, a five-block stretch of Main Street (extended to Washington Street to include the old Scott County Courthouse), was primarily developed between 1880 and 1920, but was an active commercial area from the town's incorporation in 1852. An unknown number of its early buildings were destroyed during the American Civil War. Most of the buildings are one and two story brick structures, with a variety of commercial architectural and vernacular styles present. The courthouse is a notable late building: it was built in 1933, and has Art Deco styling.

The district was listed on the National Register of Historic Places in 2008.

== See also ==
- National Register of Historic Places listings in Scott County, Arkansas
