= Mount Pleasant Methodist Church =

Historic church in Arkansas, United States

- U.S. National Register of Historic Places
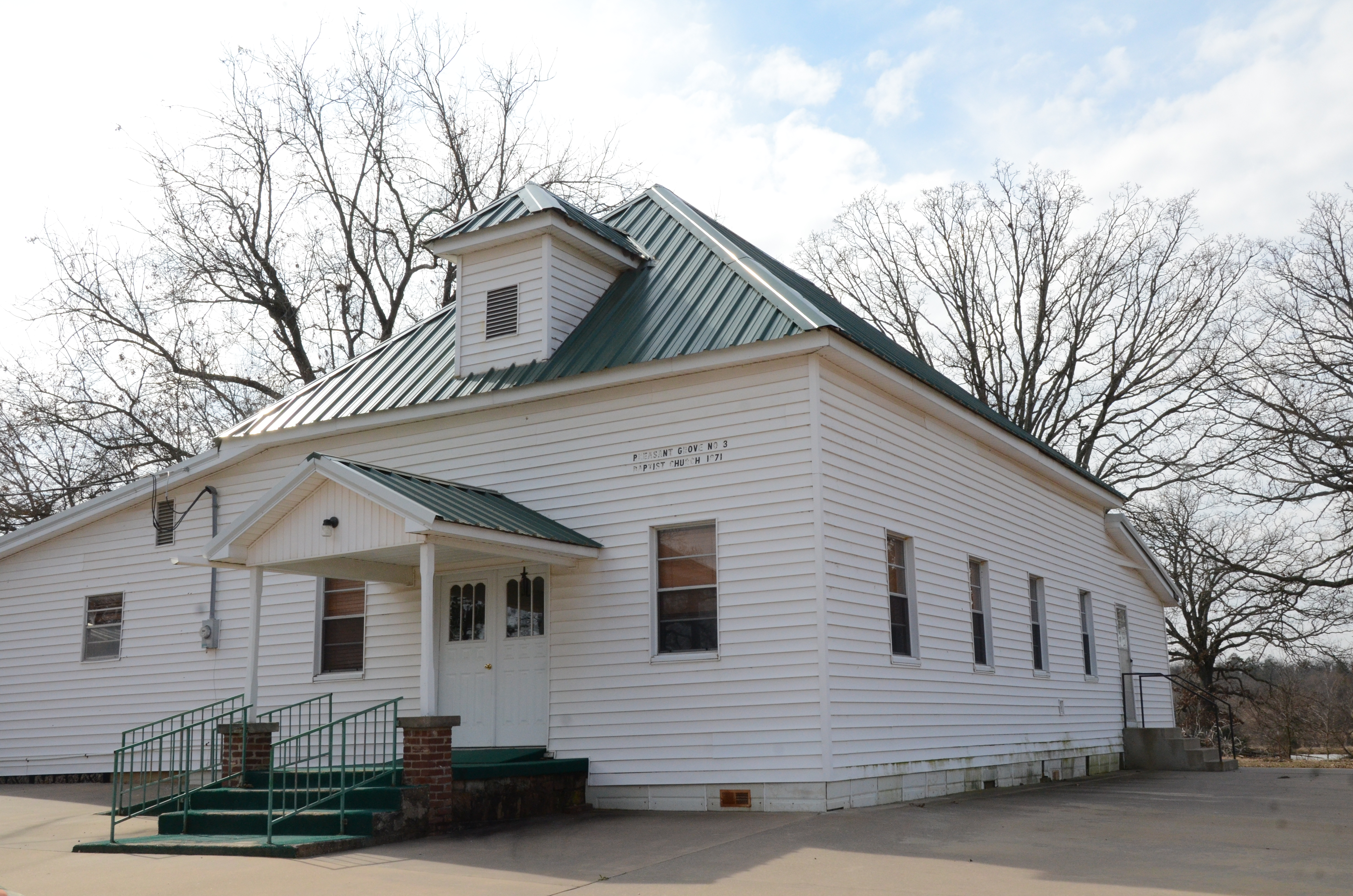
- The church in 2015; appears to be significantly altered or rebuilt

- Location within Arkansas Location within the United States
- Nearest city: Waldron, Arkansas
- Coordinates: 34°55′22″N 94°1′26″W
- Area: less than one acre
- Built: 1891
- NRHP reference No.: 86001207
- Added to NRHP: June 5, 1986

Mount Pleasant Methodist Church is historic Methodist church in Waldron, Arkansas. It is a single-story wood-frame structure, originally built in 1891 on land donated by Joseph Self, a locally prominent farmer. The church is finished in weatherboard, and has a steeply pitched gable roof, with a bell tower at the front (north) end. A shed-roof addition extends to the south (rear) of the building. The interior features a distinctive gambrel ceiling, finished in flush pine boards painted white.

The building was listed on the National Register of Historic Places in 1986. The congregation was closed by the United Methodist Church in 2020 and its property was put up for sale by the local conference in 2023.

== See also ==
- National Register of Historic Places listings in Scott County, Arkansas
