= Arkansas Highway 250 =

State highway in Arkansas, United States

Highway 250

Route information
- Maintained by ArDOT
- Length: 12.76 mi (20.54 km)
- Existed: July 10, 1957–present

Major junctions
- West end: US 71B near Waldron
- East end: AR 80 near Waldron

Location
- Country: United States
- State: Arkansas
- Counties: Scott

Highway system
- Arkansas Highway System; Interstate; US; State; Business; Spurs; Suffixed; Scenic; Heritage
← AR 249	→ AR 251

Highway 250 (AR 250, Ark. 250, and Hwy. 250) is an east–west state highway in Scott County, Arkansas. The highway begins near Waldron and runs east into the Ouachita National Forest. The route is maintained by the Arkansas Department of Transportation (ArDOT).

== Route description ==
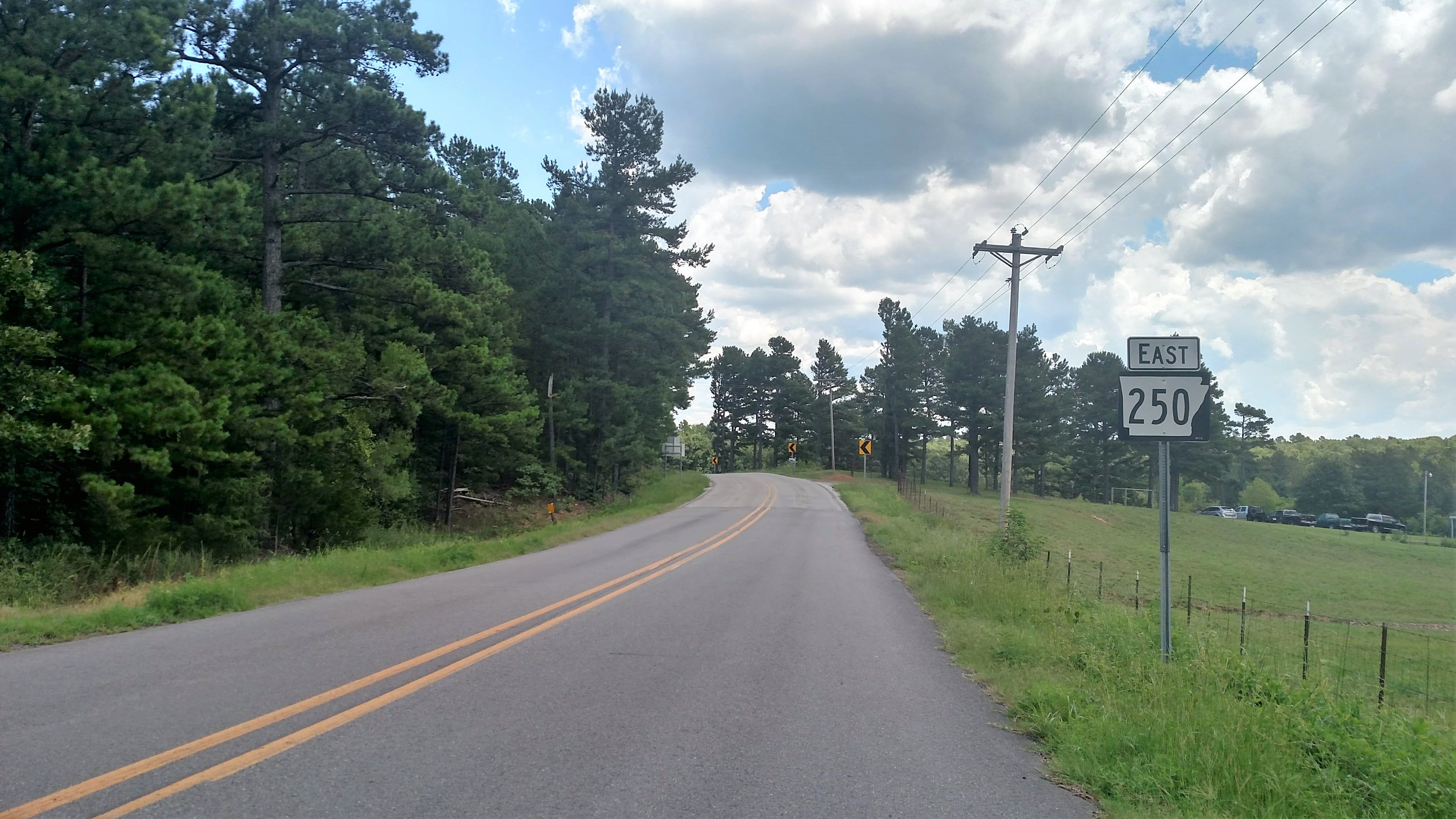
Highway 250 near the western terminus

Highway 250 begins at U.S. Highway 71 Business (US 71B) south of Waldron in Southwest Arkansas. It runs east through a sparsely populated rural area before entering the Ouachita National Forest. The route runs east, paralleling Dutch Creek until an intersection with Highway 80, where it terminates.

The ArDOT maintains Highway 250 like all other parts of the state highway system. As a part of these responsibilities, the Department tracks the volume of traffic using its roads in surveys using a metric called average annual daily traffic (AADT). ArDOT estimates the traffic level for a segment of roadway for any average day of the year in these surveys. As of 2016, the highway was estimated to have 320 vehicles per day (VPD). Highways under 400 VPD are classified as very low volume local road by the American Association of State Highway and Transportation Officials (AASHTO).

No segment of Highway 250 has been listed as part of the National Highway System, a network of roads important to the nation's economy, defense, and mobility.

== Major intersections ==
The entire route is in Scott County.

Location	mi	km	Destinations	Notes
	0.00	0.00	US 71B – Waldron	Western terminus
	12.76	20.54	AR 80 – Waldron, Danville	Eastern terminus
1.000 mi = 1.609 km; 1.000 km = 0.621 mi

== History ==
Highway 250 was created on July 10, 1957 by the Arkansas State Highway Commission during a period of expansion in the state highway system. The Arkansas General Assembly passed the Act 148 of 1957, the Milum Road Act, creating 10–12 miles (16–19 km) of new state highways in each county. It started at US 71 (now US 71B) and ran east for 2.5 miles (4.0 km). It was extended east to Highway 80 on April 24, 1963.
