= Oklahoma State Highway 128 =

State highway in Oklahoma, United States

State Highway 128
- SH-128 highlighted in red

Route information
- Maintained by ODOT
- Length: 9.81 mi (15.79 km)
- Existed: ca. 1956–present

Major junctions
- West end: US 59 / US 270 in Heavener
- East end: AR 28 at the Arkansas state line near Forrester

Location
- Country: United States
- State: Oklahoma

Highway system
- Oklahoma State Highway System; Interstate; US; State; Turnpikes
← SH-127	→ SH-130

State Highway 128 (abbreviated SH-128) is a 9.81-mile-long (15.79 km) state highway in Le Flore County, Oklahoma. It connects U.S. Route 59 (US 59) in Heavener to the Arkansas state line, where it becomes Arkansas Highway 28. It has no lettered spur routes.

SH-128 was first added to the state highway system circa 1956. It has been realigned once to better match up with roads across the Arkansas line.

== Route description ==
State Highway 128 begins at US-59/US-270 in Heavener. From the terminus south of downtown, the highway follows West Avenue I to East 1st Street, where it turns south, running parallel to US-59/US-270. Highway 128 then curves east and exits Heavener. For the remainder of its route, SH-128 runs mostly parallel to a spur from the Kansas City Southern rail line; the road crosses the tracks once, just east of the Heavener city limit. SH-128 follows the valley of the Poteau River through east-central Le Flore County, running between the river and Poteau Mountain. At the highway's approximate midpoint, the route passes through unincorporated Forrester. From here, SH-128 follows a generally east-northeast heading before crossing the state line into Scott County, Arkansas. The road continues east toward Bates as Arkansas Highway 28.

== History ==
State Highway 128 first appears on the 1957 edition of the official Oklahoma state highway map. The route has always been a paved highway. Initially, it did not connect to Highway 28 upon crossing the Arkansas state line. The route was realigned to directly connect to Highway 28 by 1961. No further changes have occurred to the highway since that time.

== Junction list ==
County	Location	mi	km	Destinations	Notes
Le Flore	Heavener	0.00	0.00	US 59 / US 270	Western terminus
Oklahoma–Arkansas state line		9.81	15.79	AR 28 continues east into Arkansas	
1.000 mi = 1.609 km; 1.000 km = 0.621 mi
