= C. E. Forrester House =

Historic house in Arkansas, United States

- U.S. National Register of Historic Places
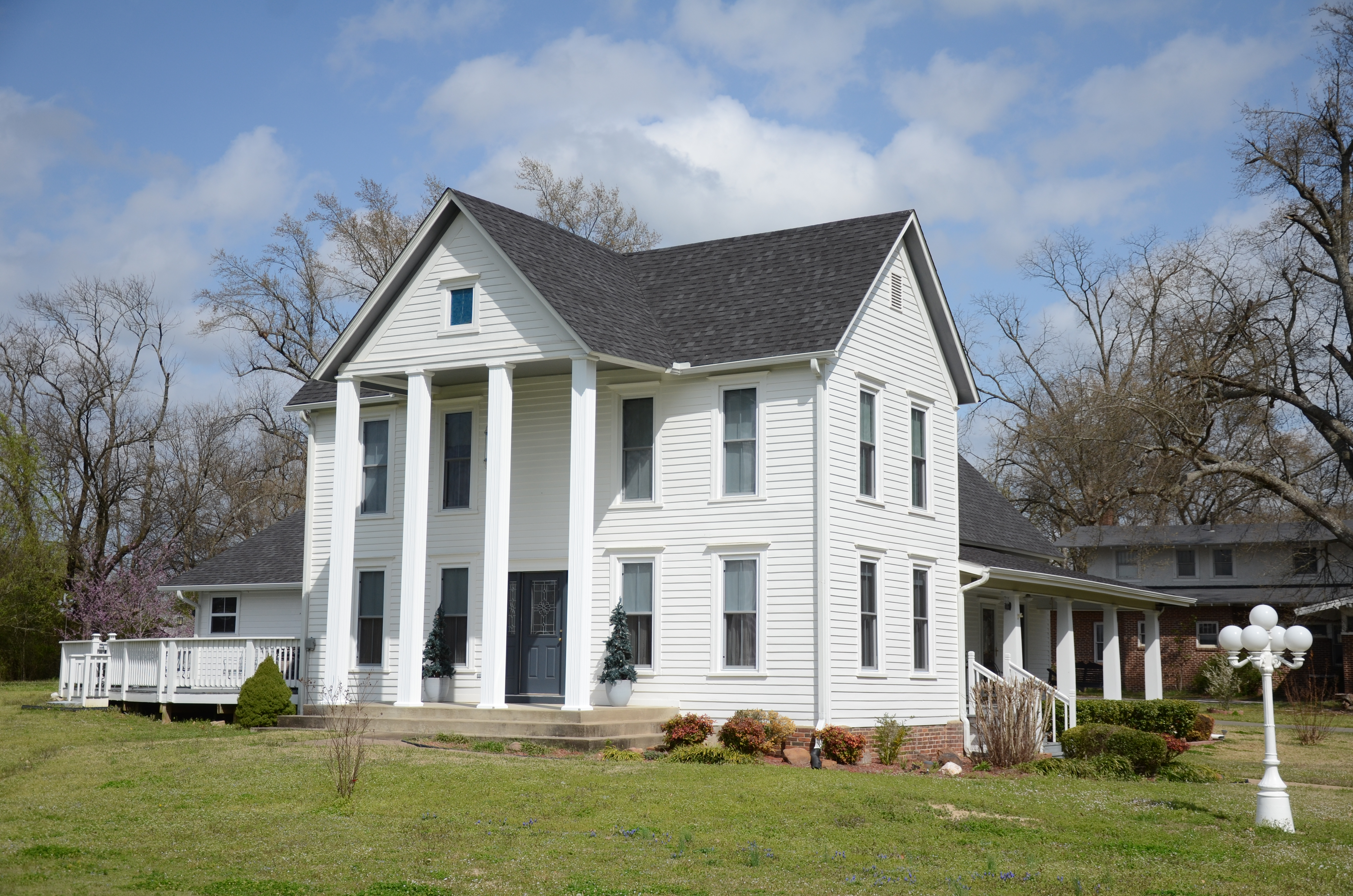

- Location within Arkansas Location within the United States
- Location: 140 Danville Rd., Waldron, Arkansas
- Coordinates: 34°53′55″N 94°5′2″W
- Area: 1.3 acres (0.53 ha)
- Built: 1896
- Architectural style: I-house
- NRHP reference No.: 98001127
- Added to NRHP: September 3, 1998

The C. E. Forrester House is a historic house at 140 Danville Road in Waldron, Arkansas. It is a two-story wood frame I-house, with an attached single-story wing extending from the rear of the center, giving it a common T-shaped plan. The original front facade has a two-story gable-roofed porch extending across part of it, while the south-facing side of the wing, now serving as the main entrance, has a vernacular Craftsman-style porch with a shed roof extending along its length. The house was built in 1896, with the wing added by 1904; it was built by Charlie Forrester, an Arkansas native who operated a number of retail and commercial business in Waldron.

The house was listed on the National Register of Historic Places in 1998.

== See also ==
- National Register of Historic Places listings in Scott County, Arkansas
