= Dooley Dipping Vat =

- U.S. National Register of Historic Places
- Location within Arkansas Location within the United States
- Nearest city: Boles, Arkansas
- Coordinates: 34°46′0″N 94°1′10″W
- Area: less than one acre
- Built: 1920
- MPS: Dip That Tick:Texas Tick Fever Eradication in Arkansas MPS
- NRHP reference No.: 06000466
- Added to NRHP: June 7, 2006

The Dooley Dipping Vat is a historic former cattle dipping facility in Ouachita National Forest, southeast of Boles, Arkansas. It is located on a high bank of Countiss Creek east of County Road 925 (Dipping Vat Road). It is a U-shaped concrete structure, oriented north–south with a concrete pad at southern (exit) end. The vat varies in depth between three and six feet (1 and 2 m), and is 48 inches (1,200 mm) wide at the entrance and 36 inches (910 mm) wide at the exit. It was built about 1920 as part of a state program to eradicate Texas tick fever from the state's cattle. The vat's name derives from James Dooley, who homesteaded a farm in the area.

The vat was listed on the National Register of Historic Places in 2006.

== See also ==
- National Register of Historic Places listings in Scott County, Arkansas
