= Nebraska, Arkansas =

American ghost town

Coordinates: 34.87065°N 93.75353°W

Nebraska is a ghost town in Scott County, in the U.S. state of Arkansas.

== History ==
Nebraska was founded in 1854. The community was named after the Nebraska Territory.

A post office called Nebraska was established in 1854, and remained in operation until 1907. With the rise of nearby rival towns Harvey and Nola, business activity shifted away from Nebraska, and its population dwindled.
