= Square Rock Dipping Vat =

- U.S. National Register of Historic Places
- Location within Arkansas Location within the United States
- Nearest city: Waldron, Arkansas
- Coordinates: 34°57′32″N 93°59′42″W
- Area: less than one acre
- Built: 1920
- MPS: Dip That Tick:Texas Tick Fever Eradication in Arkansas MPS
- NRHP reference No.: 06000464
- Added to NRHP: June 7, 2006

The Square Rock Dipping Vat is a historic former cattle dipping facility in Ouachita National Forest, northeast of Waldron, Arkansas. It is located south of Square Rock Creek, off a forest road that runs south from County Road 94. It is a partially buried U-shaped concrete structure, with a concrete pad at one end, through which cattle were directed to dip them with chemical treatment for Texas tick fever. A barbed-wire holding pen of uncertain age stands nearby. It is believed to have been built about 1920, and was probably used until 1943, when the disease was determined to have been eradicated.

The vat was listed on the National Register of Historic Places in 2006.

== See also ==
- National Register of Historic Places listings in Scott County, Arkansas
