= Cold Spring (Waldron, Arkansas) =

- U.S. National Register of Historic Places
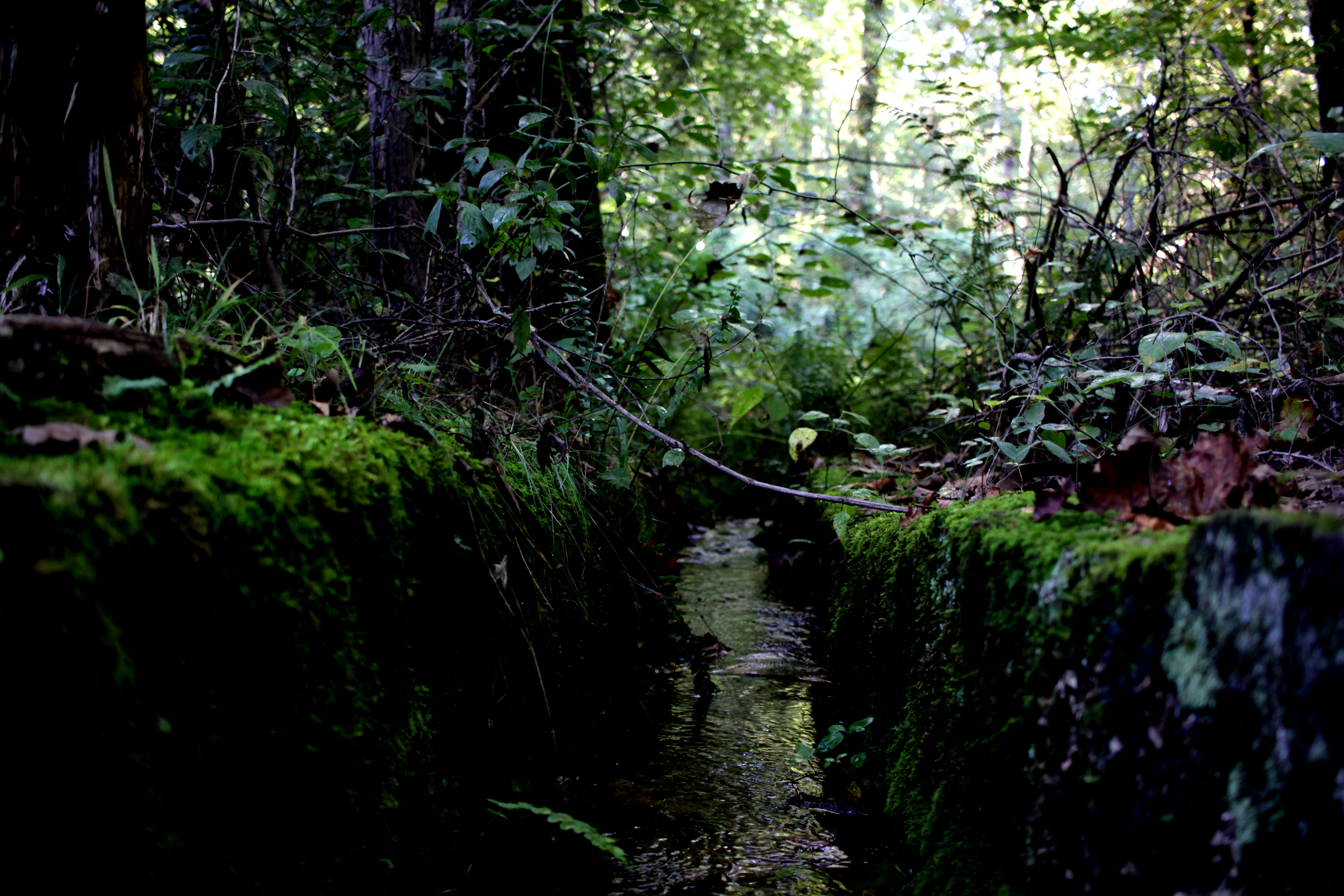

- Location within Arkansas Location within the United States
- Nearest city: Waldron, Arkansas
- Coordinates: 34°57′39″N 93°53′31″W
- Area: less than one acre
- Built: 1936
- Built by: Civilian Conservation Corps
- Architectural style: Rustic
- MPS: Facilities Constructed by the CCC in Arkansas MPS
- NRHP reference No.: 93001082
- Added to NRHP: October 21, 1993

Cold Spring is a small fresh-water spring in Ouachita National Forest, east of Waldron, Arkansas in Scott County. It is located on the south side of County Road 93 (Cold Spring Road), a short way south of where the road crosses Sugar Creek. The spring is protected by a stone and concrete structure erected by a crew of the Civilian Conservation Corps in c. 1936 to prevent contamination of the spring and erosion of the surrounding hillside. Near the spring are two open-air concrete water holding areas, from which a stone culvert channels the water to Sugar Creek. These CCC-built structures were listed on the National Register of Historic Places in 1993.

== See also ==
- National Register of Historic Places listings in Scott County, Arkansas
