= Waldron High School (Arkansas) =

Location
- 736 West Hwy 80; Waldron, Scott County, Arkansas 72958; United States
- Coordinates: 34°53′39″N 94°05′51″W

Information
- Type: Public secondary
- Motto: Our Community. Our Children. Our Commitment.
- Established: c. 1886
- School district: Waldron School District
- NCES District ID: 0513680
- CEEB code: 042565
- NCES School ID: 051368001122
- Principal: Josh Atchley
- Teaching staff: 47.56 (on FTE basis)
- Grades: 9–12
- Enrollment: 399 (2023-2024)
- Student to teacher ratio: 8.39
- Campus type: Rural
- Colors: Orange and black
- Song: Waldron Alma Mater
- Fight song: Waldron Fight Song
- Athletics conference: 4A Region 4 (2024–present)
- Sports: Football, Golf, cross country, basketball, competitive cheer, baseball, softball, swimming, athletics
- Mascot: Bulldog
- Team name: Waldron Bulldogs
- Accreditation: Arkansas Department of Education
- Yearbook: The Bulldog
- Feeder schools: Waldron Middle School (grades 6–8)
- Affiliations: Arkansas Activities Association
- Website: www.waldronschools.org/apps/pages/index.jsp?uREC_ID=1522649&type=d&pREC_ID=1658829

Waldron High School is a comprehensive public secondary school located in Waldron, Arkansas, United States. The school educates more than 450 students annually in grades nine through twelve. Waldron is the larger of two public high schools in Scott County and is the sole high school administered by the Waldron School District.

== Academics ==
The assumed course of study for students is to complete the Smart Core curriculum developed by the Arkansas Department of Education (ADE), which requires students complete at least 22 units for graduation. Students complete regular (core and career focus) courses and exams and may select Advanced Placement classes and exams with opportunities for college credit via AP exam. The school is accredited by the ADE and receives Title I federal funding. As of June 23, 2012, accreditation is under advisement with AdvancED.

== Athletics ==
The Waldron High School mascot is the Bulldog with the school colors of orange and black.

For the 2012–14 seasons, the Waldron Bulldogs participate in the 4A Classification within the 4A Region 7 Conference. Competition is primarily sanctioned by the Arkansas Activities Association with student-athletes competing in football, volleyball, golf (boys/girls), cross country (boys/girls), basketball (boys/girls), competitive cheer, baseball, softball, and track and field (boys/girls).

- Track and field: The girls track and field teams have won two state championships (1974, 1978).
