= Harvey, Arkansas =

- Unincorporated community
- Location within Arkansas Location within the United States
- Coordinates: 34°50′45″N 93°47′07″W
- Country: United States
- State: Arkansas
- County: Scott
- Elevation: 600 ft (180 m)
- Time zone: UTC-6 (Central (CST))
  - Summer (DST): UTC-5 (CDT)
- ZIP code: 72841
- Area code: 479
- GNIS feature ID: 71928

Harvey is an unincorporated community in Scott County, Arkansas, United States. Harvey is located on Arkansas Highway 28, 18 miles (29 km) east of Waldron. Harvey has a post office with ZIP code 72841.

== History ==
A post office has been in operation at Harvey since 1893.

== Notable person ==
State Representative Marcus Richmond, a Republican who took office in 2015, resides in Harvey.
