= Mitchell House (Waltreak, Arkansas) =

Historic house in Arkansas, United States

- U.S. National Register of Historic Places
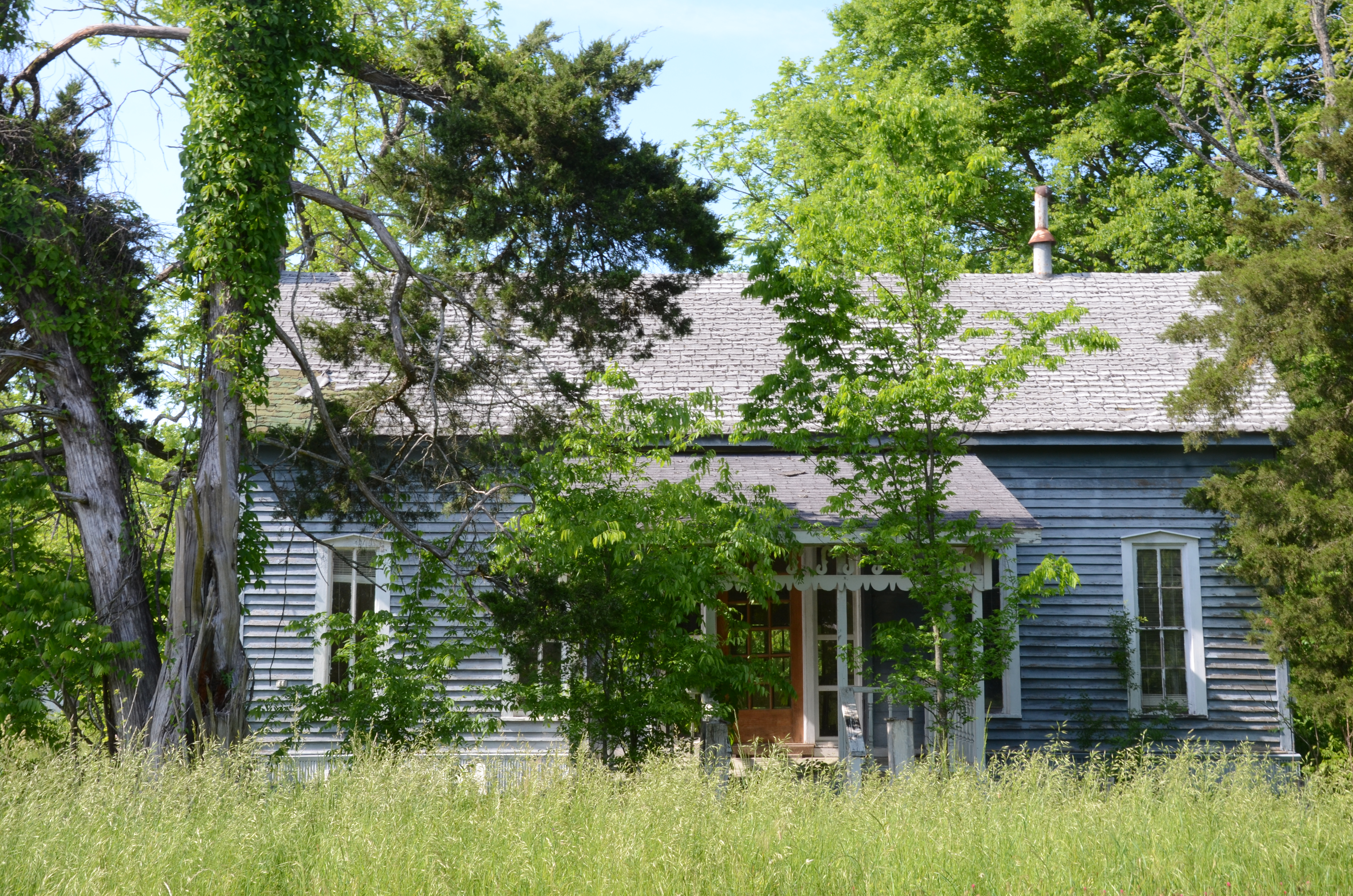

- Location within Arkansas Location within the United States
- Location: AR 80 W of Watson Branch, Waltreak, Arkansas
- Coordinates: 34°59′4″N 93°36′58″W
- Area: less than one acre
- Built: 1891
- Architectural style: Greek Revival, Vernacular dogtrot
- NRHP reference No.: 90000876
- Added to NRHP: June 7, 1990

The Mitchell House is a historic house in rural Yell County, Arkansas. It is located on the north side of Arkansas Highway 80, east of the Waltreak Methodist Church, in a northeastern finger of the Ouachita National Forest. The house is a single-story dogtrot structure, with a gable roof and a cross-gabled rear kitchen ell. The central breezeway has been enclosed, and houses the building entrance, which is sheltered by a shed-roof porch artfully decorated with vernacular woodwork. Built in 1891, it is one of the few 19th-century buildings surviving in the area, and is a well-preserved and unusual example of the dogtrot form.

The house was listed on the National Register of Historic Places in 1990.

== See also ==
- National Register of Historic Places listings in Yell County, Arkansas
