= Scott County Courthouse (Arkansas) =

- U.S. National Register of Historic Places
- U.S. Historic district – Contributing property
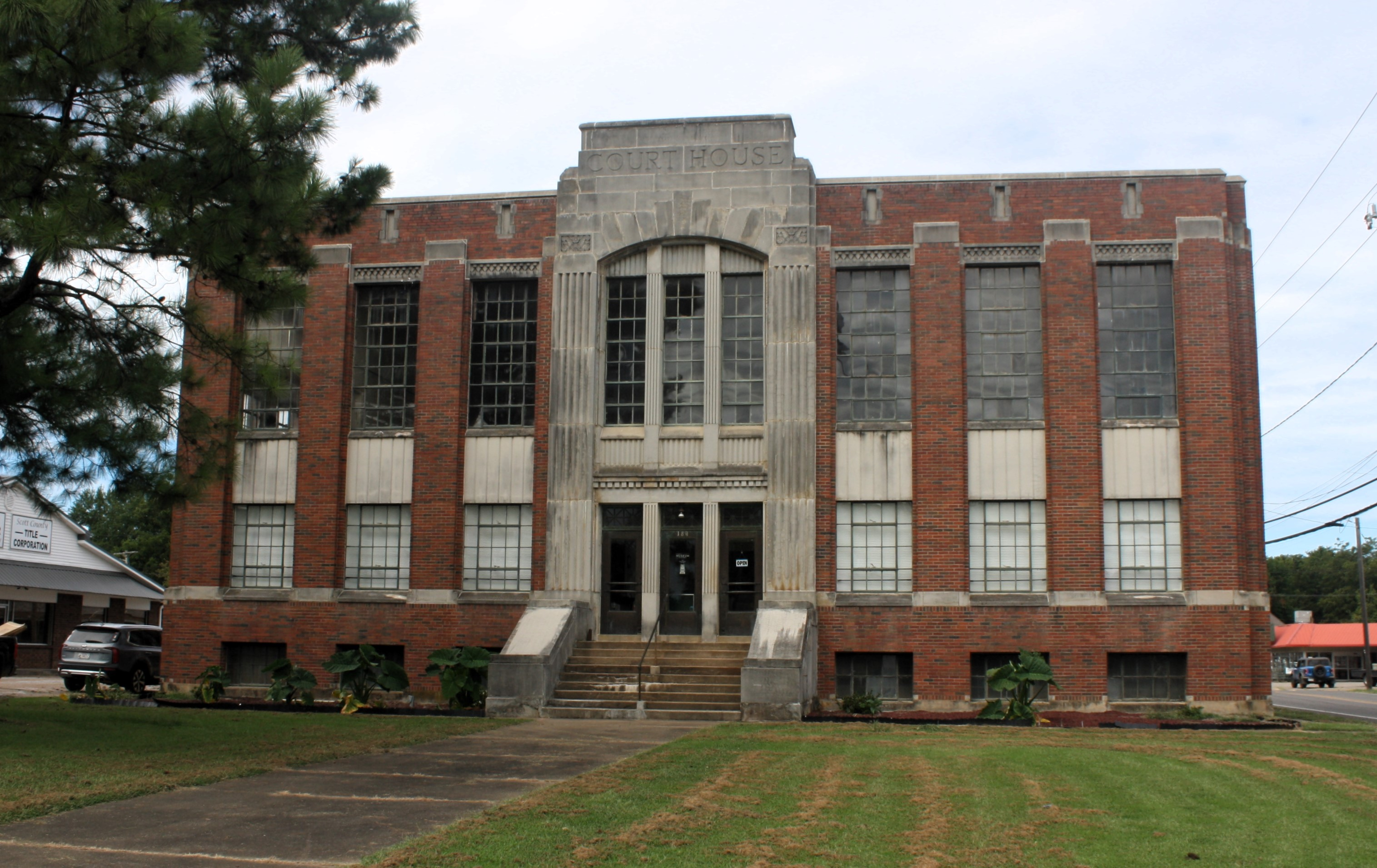

- Location within Arkansas Location within the United States
- Location: 252 S. Main St., Waldron, Arkansas
- Coordinates: 34°53′56″N 94°5′26″W
- Area: 1 acre (0.40 ha)
- Built: 1933
- Architect: Bassham & Wheeler
- Architectural style: Art Deco
- Part of: Waldron Commercial Historic District (ID08000943)
- NRHP reference No.: 89001971

Significant dates
- Added to NRHP: November 13, 1989
- Designated CP: September 25, 2008

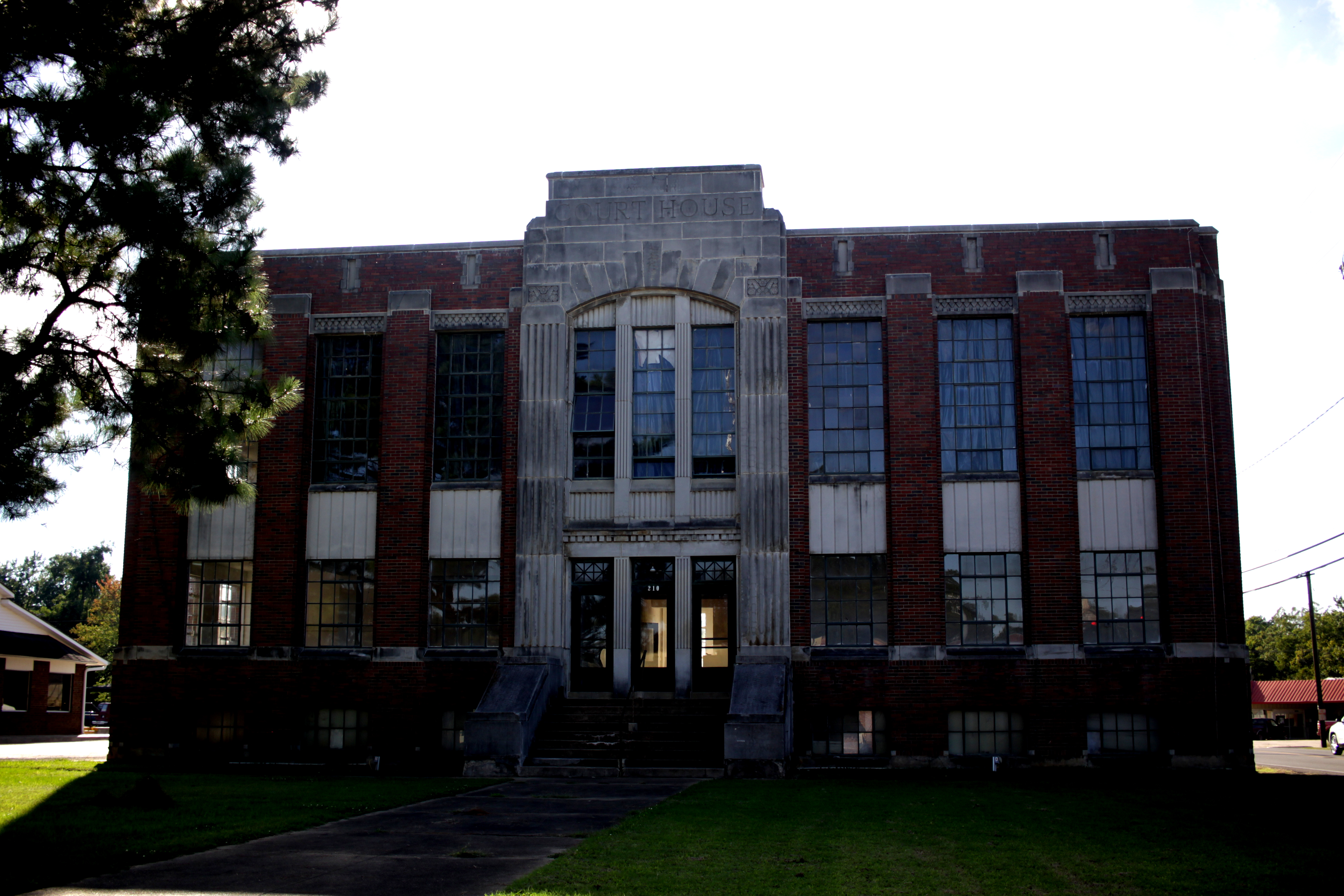

The former Scott County Courthouse is located at 252 South Main Street in Waldron, Arkansas. The current facility is located on 1st Street. The old courthouse is a two-story brick Art Deco building, set on a high foundation, and with a flat roof that has a parapet. The building was designed by Bassham & Wheeler of Fort Smith, and was built in 1934 with funding from the Works Progress Administration. It replaced an older building on the same site that was destroyed by fire.

The building was listed on the National Register of Historic Places in 1989; it is also a contributing element to the Waldron Commercial Historic District. In 2022, the Scott County Museum of History opened in the building.

== See also ==
- National Register of Historic Places listings in Scott County, Arkansas
