= Powder Magazine (Blue Ball, Arkansas) =

- U.S. National Register of Historic Places

- Location within Arkansas Location within the United States
- Nearest city: Blue Ball, Arkansas
- Coordinates: 35°0′8″N 93°43′7″W
- Area: 1.5 acres (0.61 ha)
- Built: 1935
- Built by: Civilian Conservation Corps
- MPS: Facilities Constructed by the CCC in Arkansas MPS
- NRHP reference No.: 93001096
- Added to NRHP: October 20, 1993

The Powder Magazine is a surviving structure of the Civilian Conservation Corps (CCC) camp of the 1707th Company. Located in Ouachita National Forest in the northeast corner of Scott County, Arkansas, it is a small stone and concrete structure about 4 by 3 feet (1.22 m × 0.91 m) and between 3 and 4-1/2 feet in height. It is located about 50 yards (46 m) south of the T-shaped junction of two forest roads (designated #96 and #99) in 1993) on top of a ridge above Dutch Creek. The structure was built to house the camp's explosives, which were typically used by the camp crew for road and bridge building projects.

The structure was listed on the National Register of Historic Places in 1993.

== See also ==
- National Register of Historic Places listings in Scott County, Arkansas
