= National Beta Club =

International honor society for primary and secondary students

- Founded: 1934; 92 years ago Spartanburg, SC
- Type: Honor
- Affiliation: Independent
- Status: Active
- Emphasis: Elementary and secondary school students
- Scope: International
- Motto: "Let Us Lead By Serving Others"
- Pillars: Academic Achievement, Character, Leadership, Service
- Member badge
- Colors: Black and Gold
- Mascot: J.W. the Boston Terrier
- Chapters: 9,600
- Members: 458,116 active 7,000,000+ lifetime
- Nickname: Beta Club, Beta
- Headquarters: 151 Beta Club Way; Spartanburg, South Carolina 29306; United States
- Website: www.betaclub.org

The National Beta Club (often called "Beta Club" or simply "Beta") is an International honor society for 4th through 12th-grade students. Its purpose is to promote academic achievement, character, leadership, and service among elementary and secondary school students. The National Beta Club is the largest independent educational society for youths in the United States. Headquartered in Spartanburg, South Carolina, the organization has more than 9,600 clubs nationally and more than 450,000 active members.

== History ==
Dr. John W. Harris, a Wofford College professor, founded the National Honorary Beta Club as a co-educational high school academic honors program. His idea was to create an organization like Phi Beta Kappa, Kiwanis, and Rotary for high school students. With the permission of principals and superintendents, Harris presented his plan to local high school literary societies and their sponsors. Its charter members were twelve students were initiated in December 1932 at Clover High School in Clover, South Carolina.

Its charter members included:

- Robert Earle Caldwell
- Mary Davis
- Lois Howell
- Joe Jackson
- Agnes Jordan
- Edd Moore
- Mary Riddle
- Tom Riddle
- Nelle Thomasson
- Martha Winget

The National Honorary Beta Club was registered in Kentucky by J. F. Drake, B.B. Green, and W. B. Storker on December 15, 1932. The purpose of the organization was "the maintenancee of a high standard of scholarship in the classroom and installing the ideals of loyalty, courage, leadership, honesty, and integrity in the high school students."

The first Beta Club chapter was established at Landrum High School in Landrum, South Carolina on January 8, 1934, by incorporating the fifteen members of the pre-existing Landrum High School Literary Society. The club's sponsor was teacher Helen Prince. Other clubs established in South Carolina in 1934 include Simpsonville High School in February; Duncan High School in October; Ellen Woodside School, Elloree High School, Greer High School, Hickory Grove High School, Walhalla High School, and Woodruff High School in November; and Brookland-Cayce High School, Paris School, and Summerton High School in December.

Clubs were also established at China Grove High School, the Lewisville High School, and the Woodleaf High School in North Carolina in October 1934, followed by Cary High School and Granite Quarry High School in December 1934. The first club in Georgia was formed at Royston High School in November 1934. Each club had a teacher who serves as its sponsor. Members recruited from the junior and senior classes for outstanding scholarship and good character.

The National Beta Club held its first convention in May 1934 in Spartanburg, South Carolina. Its student magazine, The Beta Journal, was established in September 1934. There were 75 clubs in four states by the end of 1935.

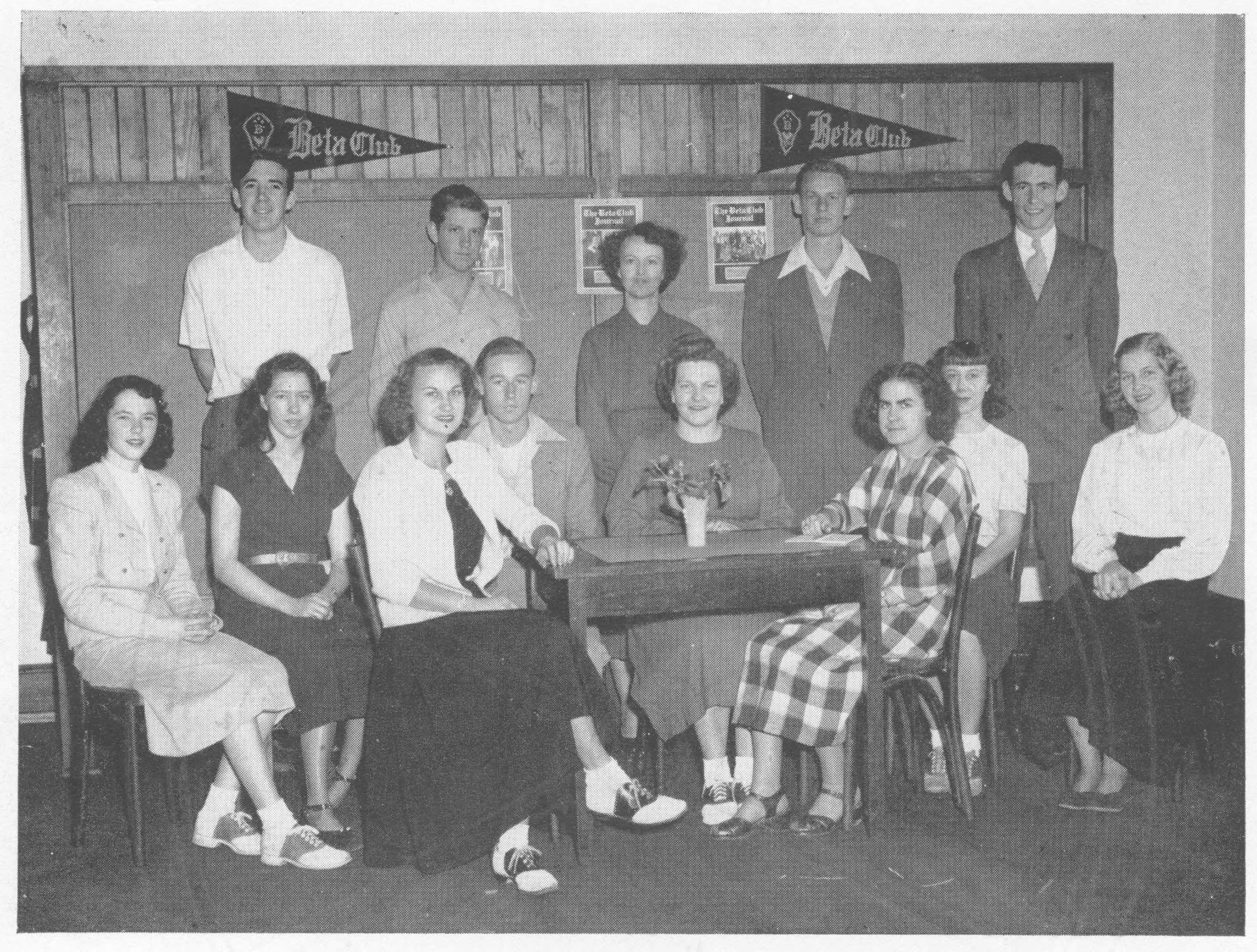
Beta Club at Millbrook High School in Raleigh, North Carolina in 1949.

The Beta Club established a loan program that helped 1,500 members attend college before replacing the program with scholarships. In 1961, the Junior Beta Club was formed for middle school students. The first Junior Beta Club was established at Millsap Elementary in Millsap, Texas in August 1961.

The Beta Club held its first national convention in June 1981 in Orlando, Florida. It celebrated Founder's Day for the first time on October 27, 2017. The Elementary Beta division was launched in 2023.

As of the 2023–2023 academic year, there were 509,515 active members in the Senior and Junior divisions and over 7 million alumni. The National Beta Club is the largest independent educational society for youths in the United States. Its headquarters are located at 151 Beta Club Way in Spartanburg, South Carolina.

== Symbols ==
Harris selected the name Beta Club because high achievers earned A or B grades; Beta was the Greek letter for B. The Beta Club's original motto was "We Lead, Others Follow. This was replaced in 1942, with "Let Us Lead By Serving Others." Its pillars are Academic Achievement, Character, Leadership, and Service. Its colors are black and gold.

The member induction ceremony uses five colored candles: red, white, and blue to symbolize the United States and Beta's colors of black and gold.

In 2016, Beta Club introduced J.W. the Boston Terrier, its mascot named after the honor society's founder. Its publication is The Beta Journal.

== Membership ==
The National Beta Club has three membership divisions:

- Elementary Beta – Grades 4 and 5
- Junior – Grades 6 through 8
- Senior – Grades 9 through 12

Traditionally, students are awarded membership based on their grades (GPA), or test scores and character traits. Each school chooses what items they will look at for their chapter's member qualifications.

== Activities ==
Annually, the National Beta Club awards over $300,000 in scholarships to more than 250 twelfth-grade Senior Beta Members. The scholarship are supported in part by donations from corporations and philanthropists. It also present various awards to clubs, alumni, and sponsors. At the local level, clubs participate in community service and celebrate National Beta Week and Founders Day.

The Beta Club hosts national conventions each summer for the Elementary, Junior, and Senior levels. State conventions are held for member and sponsors in eighteen states. At the conventions, members participate in various academic and talent competitions, including academic tests, performing arts, S.T.E.M. competitions, and visual arts.

== Chapters ==
As of 2005, the National Beta Club has clubs or chapters across the United States and in The Bahamas, Germany, Guam, Puerto Rico, Russia, and the Virgin Islands. In 2024, it had chartered 9,600 clubs in the United States and internationally.

== Notable members ==
- Evelyn Ammons, Arkansas House of Representatives
- Laphonza Butler, United States Senate
- Bill Clinton, 42nd President of the United States
- Javaris Crittenton, professional basketball player
- Jake Delhomme, professional football athlete
- Ericka Dunlap, Miss America 2004
- Kevin Durant, professional basketball player, actor
- Millard Fuller, founder of Habitat for Humanity
- Ernie Fletcher, 60th governor of Kentucky and United States House of Representatives
- Millard Fuller, Habitat for Humanity founder
- Carolyn Kreiter-Foronda, Poet Laureate of Virginia
- Heather French Henry, Miss America 2000
- Lynn Norment, a journalist known for her thirty years of writing and editing Ebony Magazine
- Destin Sandlin, YouTube science communicator
- Diane Sawyer, television journalist
- Shawntel Smith, Miss America in 1996
- Justin Timberlake, singer-songwriter
- Herschel Walker, professional football player
- Trisha Yearwood, country musician

== See also ==
- High school club
- Honor Society
