= Waldron School District =

School district in Arkansas, United States

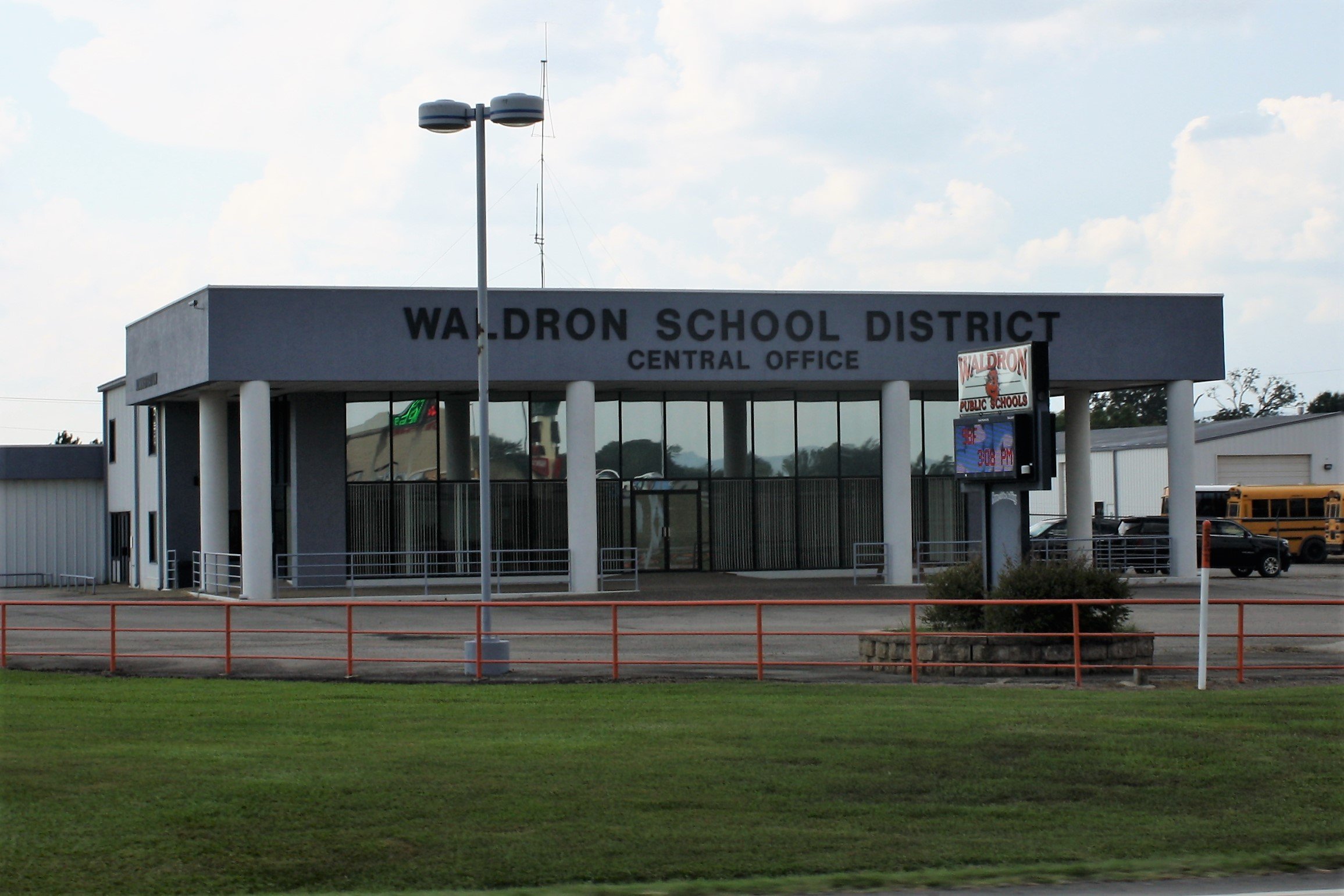
- Waldron School District Central Office

Address
- 1560 West 6th Street Waldron, Scott County, Arkansas, 72958; United States

District information
- Motto: Our Community. Our Children. Our Commitment.
- Grades: K–12
- Superintendent: Daniel Fielding
- Asst. superintendent(s): Chris Lipham
- Governing agency: Arkansas Department of Education
- Accreditation: ADE
- Schools: 4
- NCES District ID: 0513680
- District ID: AR-6401000

Students and staff
- Students: 1,576
- Teachers: 119.40 (on FTE basis)
- Staff: 152.85 (on FTE basis)
- Student–teacher ratio: 13.20
- District mascot: Bulldog
- Colors: Orange Black

Other information
- Website: www.waldronschools.org

Waldron School District is a school district in Scott County, Arkansas.

== Schools ==
- Waldron High School, serving grades 9 through 12.
- Waldron Middle School, serving grades 5 through 8.
- Waldron Elementary School, serving kindergarten through grade 4.
- Adventure Online Academy, serving grades 1 through 12.
