= Mount George, Arkansas =

- Unincorporated community
- Location within Arkansas Location within the United States
- Coordinates: 35°06′47″N 93°14′31″W
- Country: United States
- State: Arkansas
- County: Yell
- Elevation: 348 ft (106 m)
- Time zone: UTC-6 (Central (CST))
  - Summer (DST): UTC-5 (CDT)
- Area code: 479
- GNIS feature ID: 77712

Mount George is an unincorporated community in Yell County, Arkansas, United States, located at the junction of Arkansas Highways 28 and 154, 9 miles (14 km) south-southwest of Dardanelle.
