= A. G. Washburn =

Arkansas state legislator (1845–1918)

Albert G. Washburn (March 14, 1845 – October 2, 1918) known as A.G. Washburn, was a state legislator in Arkansas. He served in the Arkansas House of Representatives in 1879, 1885, and 1887. His photograph was included with other representatives who served in 1885. He also served two terms as a state senator. He was a Democrat.

Washburn was born March 14, 1845, in Mobile, Alabama. He was a veteran of the Confederate Army. He represented Scott County, Arkansas. He was preceded by James H. Smith in 1877 and succeeded by F. C. Gaines in 1879. W. A. Houck succeeded him in the Arkansas House in 1889 while Washburn represented Sebastian County and Scott County in the Arkansas Senate. He also served in the state senate in 1891 and was succeeded in 1893 by J. Frank Weaver.

Washburn died on October 2, 1918, in Oklahoma.
