= Oklahoma State Highway 130 =

State highway in Oklahoma, United States

State Highway 130

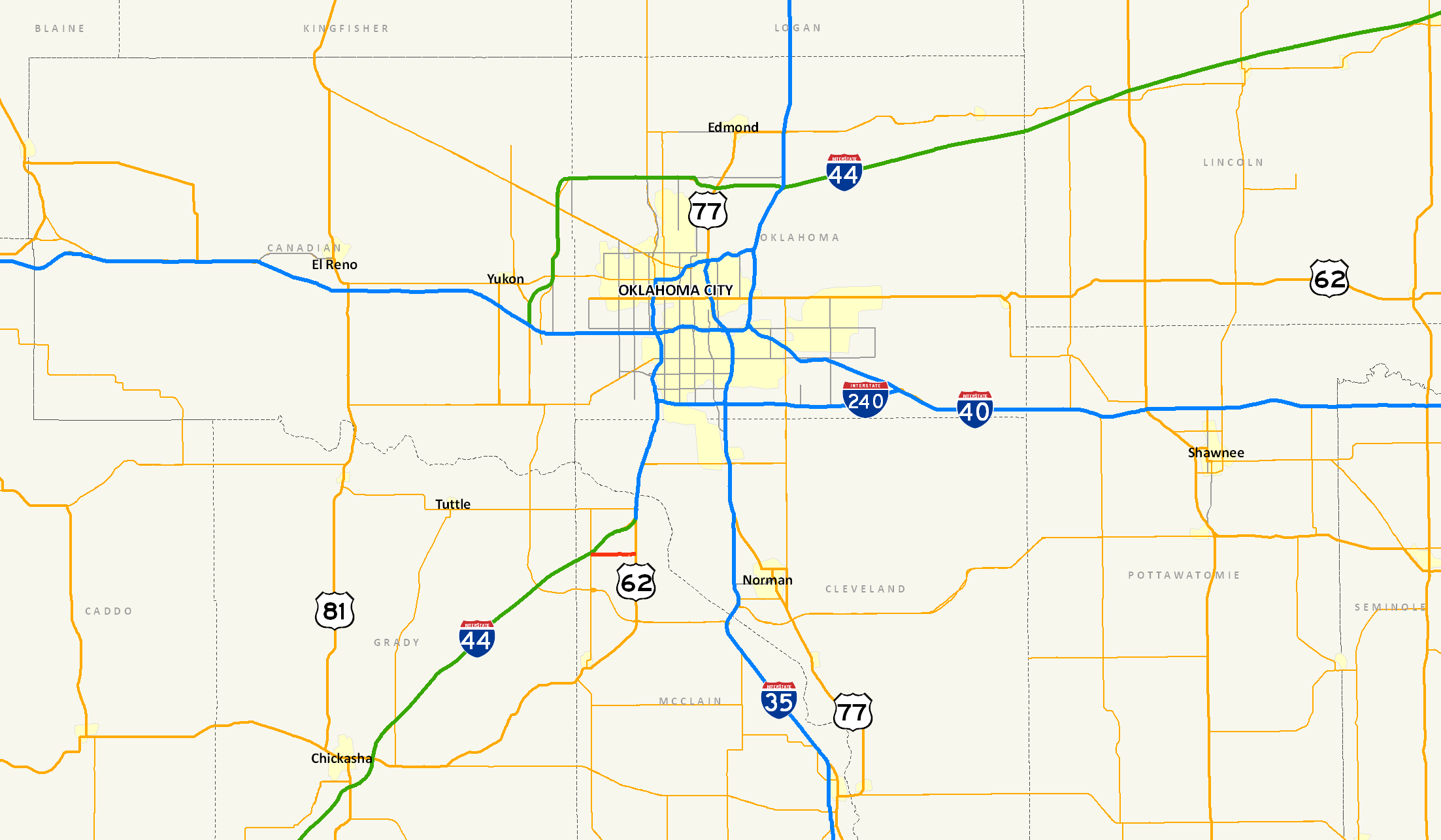

Route information
- Maintained by ODOT
- Length: 3.00 mi (4.83 km)
- Existed: 1956 – 1964; 1978–present

Major junctions
- West end: SH-76 west of Newcastle
- East end: US 62 / US 277 in Newcastle

Location
- Country: United States
- State: Oklahoma

Highway system
- Oklahoma State Highway System; Interstate; US; State; Turnpikes
← SH-128	→ SH-131

State Highway 130, also known as SH-130 or OK-130, is a 3.00-mile (4.83 km) highway maintained by the U.S. state of Oklahoma. It is entirely within McClain County. It does not have any lettered spur routes.

== Route description ==
It runs between SH-76 north of Blanchard to a traffic light on US-62/277 in the southwest part of Newcastle. The speed limit is 55 MPH (88 km/h) for most of the route, though on the east end of the highway the speed limit falls to 45 MPH (72 km/h).

SH-130 is also signed as Fox Lane by the city of Newcastle.

== History ==
SH-130 first appeared on the 1957 ODOT map, which was also the first to show SH-76's extension to Newcastle (previously, SH-76 ended in Blanchard). From 1957 to 1964, it was composed of gravel. The route was apparently decommissioned in either 1964 or early 1965, as it appears on the 1964 map but not the 1965 edition. SH-130 was brought back fourteen years later, reappearing on the 1979 map as a paved highway. No changes have been made to the highway since then.

== Junction list ==
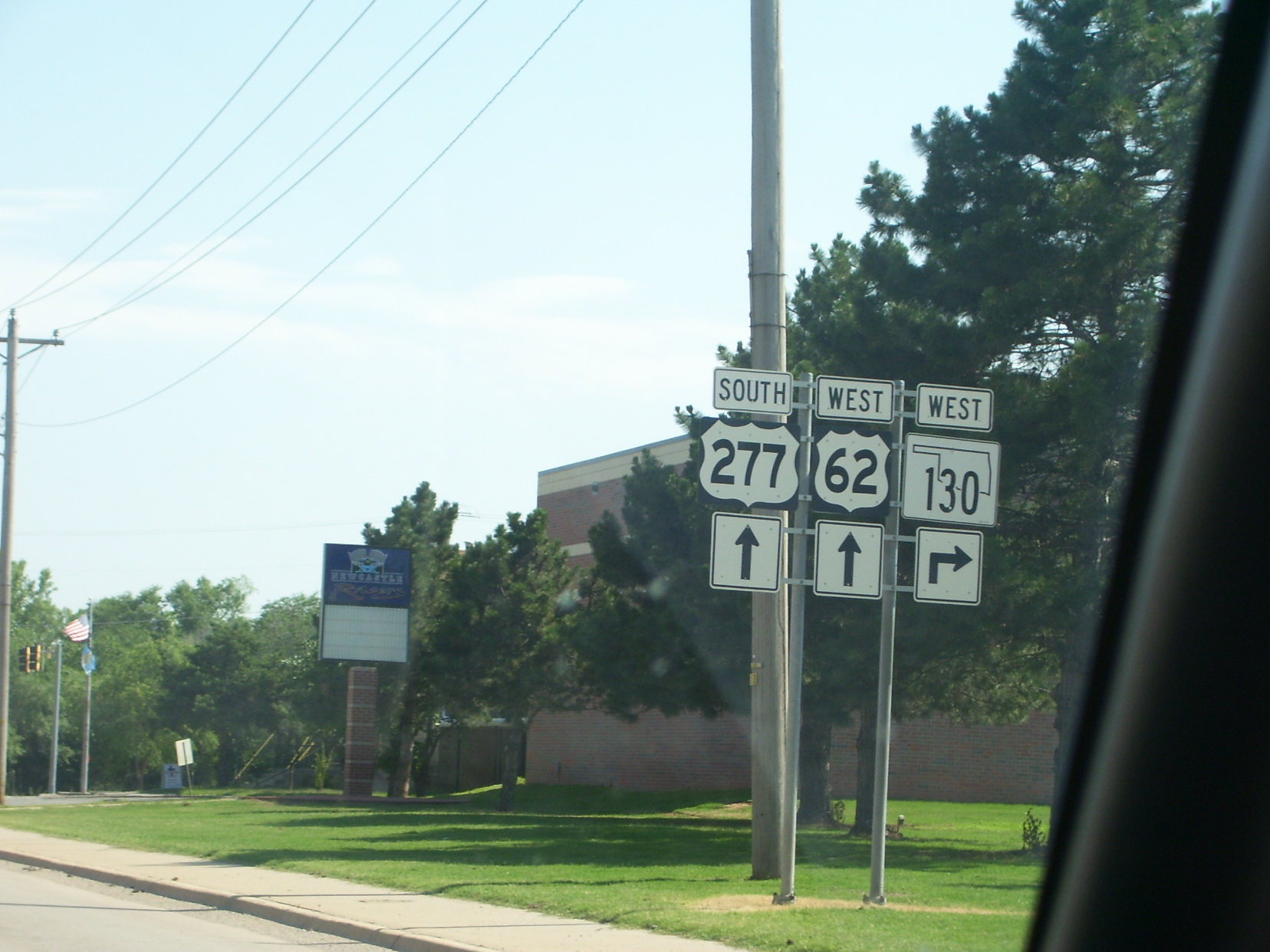
SH-130 as viewed from US-62/277 in Newcastle

The entire route is in Newcastle, McClain County.

mi	km	Destinations	Notes
0.00	0.00	SH-76	Western terminus
3.00	4.83	US 62 / US 277	Eastern terminus
1.000 mi = 1.609 km; 1.000 km = 0.621 mi
