= Nebraska, Ohio =

Coordinates: 39°42′15″N 82°53′33″W

Nebraska is a ghost town in Pickaway County, in the U.S. state of Ohio.

== History ==
Nebraska was originally called Hedges' Store, after its proprietor Andrew Hedges. A post office called Hedges Store was established in 1854, the name was changed to Nebraska in 1862, and the post office was discontinued in 1902. Nebraska was named after the Nebraska Territory.
