= Nella, Arkansas =

Unincorporated community in Arkansas, U.S.

Coordinates: 34°45′37″N 94°09′49″W

Nella is an unincorporated community in Scott County, in the U.S. state of Arkansas.

== History ==
Nella was founded in 1903. A post office called Nella was established in 1903, and remained in operation until 1953. A variant name is "Gist Town". It is unknown why the present name "Nella" was applied to this community.
