= Arkansas Highway 80 =

State highway in Arkansas, United States

Highway 80

Route information
- Maintained by ArDOT
- Length: 49.87 mi (80.26 km)

Major junctions
- West end: AR 28 in Hon
- US 71 in Waldron
- East end: AR 27 in Danville

Location
- Country: United States
- State: Arkansas
- Counties: Scott, Yell

Highway system
- Arkansas Highway System; Interstate; US; State; Business; Spurs; Suffixed; Scenic; Heritage
← US 79	→ AR 81

Highway 80 (AR 80, Ark. 80, and Hwy. 80) is an east–west state highway in the Ouachita Mountains. The route of 49.87 miles (80.26 km) begins at AR 28 at Hon and runs east to AR 27 in Danville. The route is maintained by the Arkansas Department of Transportation (ArDOT).

== Route description ==
The highway begins at AR 28 in western Scott County within the Ouachita Mountains. AR 28 runs southeast to Waldron, where it has a junction with US Highway 71 (US 71) on the city's west side. After this intersection, AR 80 continues due east as a section line road and major east–west route in the city. An intersection with US Highway 71 Business (US 71B) just south of downtown Waldron gives access to the primary commercial areas of Waldron. Continuing east, the highway serves as the western terminus for AR 248 just south of the Poteau River near the eastern city limits of Waldron. Just east of this junction, AR 80 passes the Poteau Work Center owned and operated by the United States Forest Service. East of Waldron, AR 80 enters the Ouachita National Forest, a dense pine and cypress forest. The route winds through the forest, serving as the eastern terminus of AR 250 before entering Yell County.

AR 80 continues through the National Forest to Waltreak, where it passes the Mitchell House listed on the National Register of Historic Places. It continues east through Chalybeate Springs before leaving the Forest near Macedonia. It curves northeast and runs along Dutch Creek as the highway enters Danville. AR 80 intersects AR 27 in southern Danville, where it terminates.

== History ==
An earlier AR 80 was designated in the 1926 Arkansas state highway numbering from AR 45 at Prairie Grove to the Oklahoma border. This was deleted in 1931, as it was replaced by US 62. The current route was designated in 1945.

== Major intersections ==
County	Location	mi	km	Destinations	Notes
Scott	Hon	0.00	0.00	AR 28	Western terminus
Scott	Waldron	5.34	8.59	US 71 – Texarkana, Fort Smith	
Scott	Waldron	6.55	10.54	US 71B (Main St)	
Scott	Waldron	7.37	11.86	AR 248 east	Western terminus of AR 248
Scott		19.96	32.12	AR 250 west	Eastern terminus of AR 250
Yell	Danville	49.87	80.26	AR 27 – Danville, Rover	Eastern terminus
1.000 mi = 1.609 km; 1.000 km = 0.621 mi

== Former route ==
State Road 80
- Location: Washington County
- Length: 10.3 mi (16.6 km)
- Existed: 1931

State Road 80 (AR 80, Ark. 80, and Hwy. 80) was a state highway of 10.3 miles (16.6 km) in Washington County. The route began at the Oklahoma state line and ran east to AR 45 east of Lincoln.

=== Major intersections ===
The entire route is in Washington County.

Location	mi	km	Destinations	Notes
	0.0	0.0	Oklahoma state line	Western terminus
Summers	2.5	4.0	AR 99 north – Siloam Springs	
	10.3	16.6	AR 45 – Cane Hill, Prairie Grove	Eastern terminus
1.000 mi = 1.609 km; 1.000 km = 0.621 mi
