= Forrester, Oklahoma =

Unincorporated community in Oklahoma, US

Coordinates: 34°52′20″N 94°31′36″W

Forrester is an unincorporated community in Le Flore County, Oklahoma, United States. A post office was established at Forrester on June 8, 1915; it closed on February 14, 1922.
