= Parks, Arkansas =

- Unincorporated community
- Location within Arkansas Location within the United States
- Coordinates: 34°48′07″N 93°57′39″W
- Country: United States
- State: Arkansas
- County: Scott
- Elevation: 646 ft (197 m)
- Time zone: UTC-6 (Central (CST))
  - Summer (DST): UTC-5 (CDT)
- ZIP code: 72950
- Area code: 479
- GNIS feature ID: 77956

Parks is an unincorporated community in Scott County, Arkansas, United States. Parks is located on Arkansas Highway 28, 10 miles (16 km) southeast of Waldron. Parks has a ZIP code 72950.

== History ==
Parks was originally called White Church, and under the latter name was laid out in 1838. A post office called Parks has been in operation since 1838. The present name is after Cyrus Parks, the first postmaster.
