= Blue Ball, Arkansas =

Unincorporated community in Arkansas, U.S.

Coordinates: 34°57′44″N 93°42′31″W

Blue Ball is an unincorporated community in Scott and Yell counties, in the U.S. state of Arkansas.

== History ==
Blue Ball was founded in 1873, and according to tradition was named from the fancied resemblance of a nearby mountain to a blue ball. A variant name is "Blueball". A post office called Blue Ball was established in 1873, and remained in operation until 1955.

Blue Ball is the nearest settlement to Powder Magazine, a ruined Civilian Conservation Corps structure. The Powder Magazine was listed on the National Register of Historic Places in 1993.
