= Oliver, Arkansas =

Unincorporated community in Arkansas, U.S.

Coordinates: 34°55′54″N 94°15′39″W

Oliver is an unincorporated community in Scott County, in the U.S. state of Arkansas.

== History ==
A post office called Oliver was established in 1903, and remained in operation until 1932. The community most likely was named after the local Oliver family of settlers.
