= Boles, Arkansas =

- Census-designated place
- Location within Arkansas Location within the United States
- Coordinates: 34°47′10″N 94°03′02″W
- Country: United States
- State: Arkansas
- County: Scott
- Elevation: 679 ft (207 m)

Population (2020)
  - Total: 166
- Time zone: UTC-6 (Central (CST))
  - Summer (DST): UTC-5 (CDT)
- ZIP code: 72926
- Area code: 479
- GNIS feature ID: 2805626

Boles is an unincorporated community and census-designated place (CDP) in Scott County, Arkansas, United States. It was first listed as a CDP in the 2020 census with a population of 166.

Boles is located on U.S. Route 71, 8.5 miles (13.7 km) south-southeast of Waldron. Boles has a post office with ZIP code 72926.

== Demographics ==
Historical population
Census	Pop.	Note	%±
2020	166		—
U.S. Decennial Census; 2020

=== 2020 census ===
Boles CDP, Arkansas – Demographic Profile (NH = Non-Hispanic) Note: the US Census treats Hispanic/Latino as an ethnic category. This table excludes Latinos from the racial categories and assigns them to a separate category. Hispanics/Latinos may be of any race.
Race / Ethnicity	Pop 2020	% 2020
White alone (NH)	139	83.73%
Black or African American alone (NH)	0	0.00%
Native American or Alaska Native alone (NH)	1	0.60%
Asian alone (NH)	0	0.00%
Pacific Islander alone (NH)	0	0.00%
Some Other Race alone (NH)	3	1.81%
Mixed Race/Multi-Racial (NH)	17	10.24%
Hispanic or Latino (any race)	6	3.61%
Total	166	100.00%

== History ==
A post office called Boles was established in 1870. The community was named after the local Boles family of settlers.
