= Needmore, Arkansas =

Community in Scott County, Arkansas, U.S.

Coordinates: 34.8085°N 94.0393°W

Needmore is an unincorporated community in Scott County, in the U.S. state of Arkansas.

== History ==
According to tradition, the community was so named because the local country store "needed more" of everything.
