= Hon, Arkansas =

Unincorporated community in Arkansas, US

Coordinates: 34°56′21″N 94°10′53″W

Hon is an unincorporated community in Scott County, Arkansas, United States.

== History ==
The community was named after the family of John Hon, which settled the area in the 1830s. A post office called Hon was established in 1904, and remained in operation until 1973.
