= Nola, Arkansas =

Unincorporated Community in Scott County, Arkansas

Coordinates: 34°52′40″N 93°44′29″W

Nola is an unincorporated community in Scott County, in the U.S. state of Arkansas.

== History ==
A post office called Nola was established in 1907, and remained in operation until 1959. The community perhaps is named after Nola Kelley, the daughter of a local resident.
