= Waldron, Arkansas =

- City
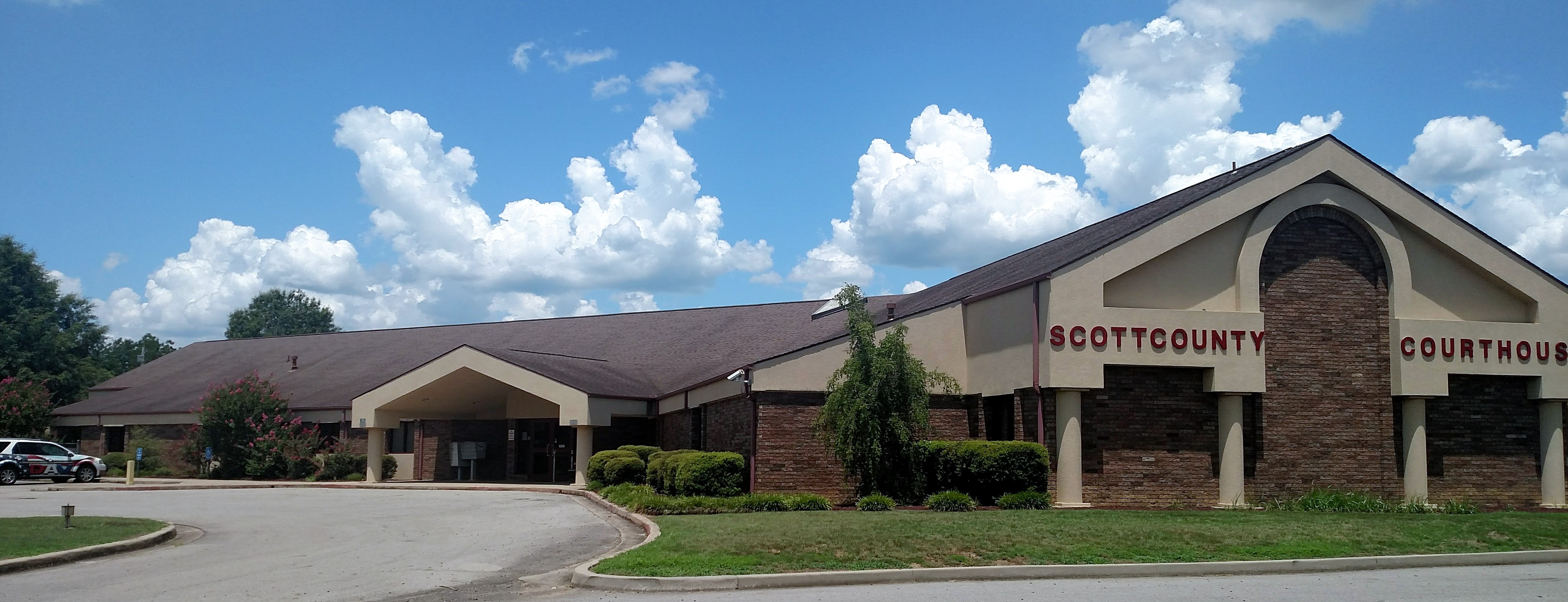
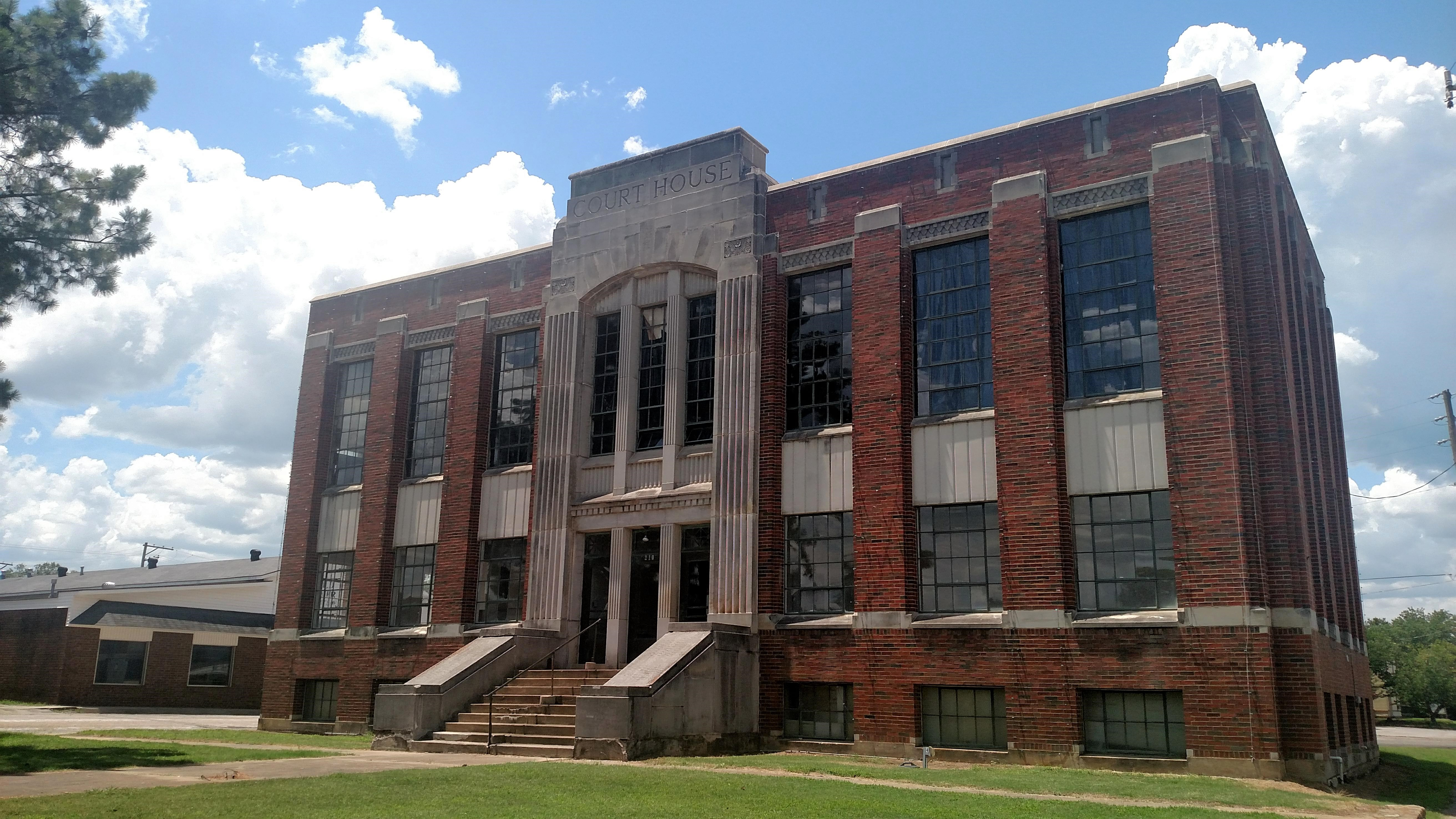
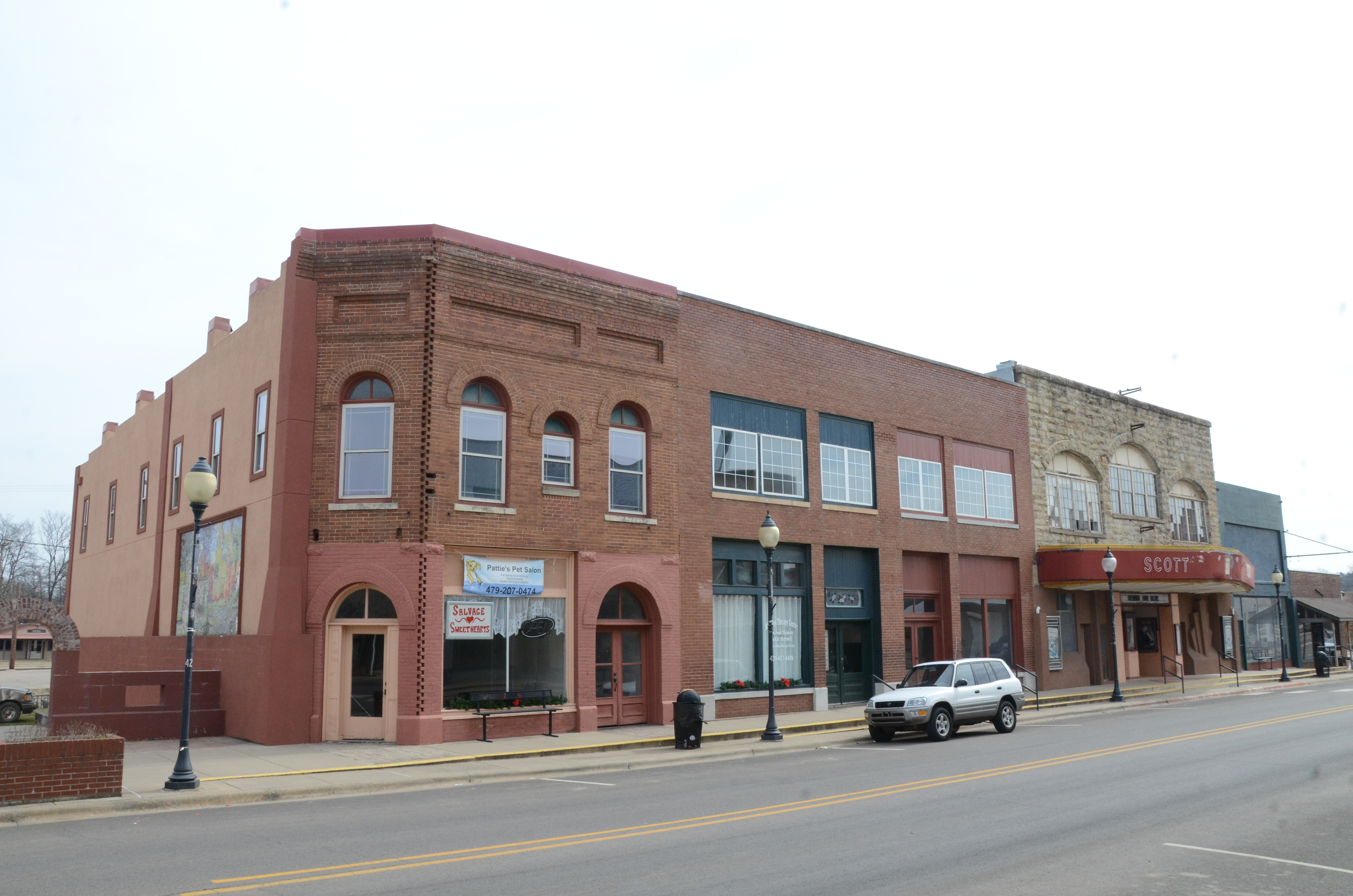
- Clockwise from top: Scott County Courthouse, Downtown Waldron, and the Old Scott County Courthouse

- Location of Waldron in Scott County, Arkansas.
- Coordinates: 34°53′57″N 94°05′29″W
- Country: United States
- State: Arkansas
- County: Scott
- Established: December 17, 1852
- Founder: W. G. Featherston
- Named for: W. P. Waldron

Government
  - Mayor: David Millard

Area
  - Total: 5.73 sq mi (14.83 km^{2})
  - Land: 5.63 sq mi (14.59 km^{2})
  - Water: 0.089 sq mi (0.23 km^{2})
- Elevation: 646 ft (197 m)

Population (2020)
  - Total: 3,386
  - Estimate (2025): 3,387 ▲
  - Density: 601.0/sq mi (232.03/km^{2})
- Time zone: UTC-6 (Central (CST))
  - Summer (DST): UTC-5 (CDT)
- ZIP codes: 72924, 72958
- Area code: 479
- FIPS code: 05-72380
- GNIS feature ID: 2405661

Waldron is a city in Scott County, Arkansas, United States. Its population was 3,386 at the 2020 census. The city is the county seat of Scott County.

== History ==
Waldron was platted in 1845 by surveyor W. P. Waldron, and named for him. A post office called Waldron has been in operation since 1846. Waldron was incorporated in 1875. Waldron was reached by the Arkansas Western Railroad from Heavener, Oklahoma in 1901. Later called the Arkansas Western Railway, a subsidiary of and subsequently incorporated into the Kansas City Southern, the line is now leased to and operated by the Arkansas Southern Railroad.

== Geography ==
According to the United States Census Bureau, the city has a total area of 5.0 square miles (13 km^{2}), of which 5.0 square miles (13 km^{2}) is land and 0.1 square miles (0.26 km^{2}) (1.19%) is water. Waldron is located approximately 38 miles south of Fort Smith, near the Poteau River.

=== Climate ===
The climate in this area is characterized by hot, humid summers and generally mild to cool winters. According to the Köppen Climate Classification system, Waldron has a humid subtropical climate, abbreviated "Cfa" on climate maps.

Climate data for Waldron, Arkansas (1991–2020 normals, extremes 1919–present)
| Month | Jan | Feb | Mar | Apr | May | Jun | Jul | Aug | Sep | Oct | Nov | Dec | Year |
|---|---|---|---|---|---|---|---|---|---|---|---|---|---|
| Record high °F (°C) | 84 (29) | 90 (32) | 95 (35) | 94 (34) | 99 (37) | 110 (43) | 111 (44) | 113 (45) | 114 (46) | 103 (39) | 87 (31) | 82 (28) | 114 (46) |
| Mean maximum °F (°C) | 71.8 (22.1) | 75.2 (24.0) | 81.4 (27.4) | 85.9 (29.9) | 89.9 (32.2) | 94.2 (34.6) | 99.5 (37.5) | 99.5 (37.5) | 95.2 (35.1) | 87.8 (31.0) | 77.8 (25.4) | 71.7 (22.1) | 101.5 (38.6) |
| Mean daily maximum °F (°C) | 50.6 (10.3) | 55.6 (13.1) | 64.0 (17.8) | 72.4 (22.4) | 79.1 (26.2) | 87.3 (30.7) | 92.2 (33.4) | 92.0 (33.3) | 85.0 (29.4) | 73.8 (23.2) | 61.6 (16.4) | 53.0 (11.7) | 72.2 (22.3) |
| Daily mean °F (°C) | 39.1 (3.9) | 43.4 (6.3) | 51.3 (10.7) | 59.7 (15.4) | 67.8 (19.9) | 75.9 (24.4) | 80.3 (26.8) | 79.5 (26.4) | 72.2 (22.3) | 61.0 (16.1) | 49.6 (9.8) | 41.6 (5.3) | 60.1 (15.6) |
| Mean daily minimum °F (°C) | 27.7 (−2.4) | 31.2 (−0.4) | 38.7 (3.7) | 46.9 (8.3) | 56.4 (13.6) | 64.5 (18.1) | 68.4 (20.2) | 66.9 (19.4) | 59.5 (15.3) | 48.3 (9.1) | 37.7 (3.2) | 30.3 (−0.9) | 48.0 (8.9) |
| Mean minimum °F (°C) | 11.1 (−11.6) | 15.2 (−9.3) | 20.6 (−6.3) | 29.8 (−1.2) | 40.3 (4.6) | 54.0 (12.2) | 59.6 (15.3) | 57.3 (14.1) | 43.4 (6.3) | 30.5 (−0.8) | 20.5 (−6.4) | 15.4 (−9.2) | 8.1 (−13.3) |
| Record low °F (°C) | −14 (−26) | −20 (−29) | 4 (−16) | 19 (−7) | 31 (−1) | 44 (7) | 49 (9) | 46 (8) | 30 (−1) | 20 (−7) | 6 (−14) | −7 (−22) | −20 (−29) |
| Average precipitation inches (mm) | 3.43 (87) | 3.17 (81) | 4.63 (118) | 5.35 (136) | 5.95 (151) | 4.67 (119) | 3.89 (99) | 3.74 (95) | 4.21 (107) | 4.66 (118) | 4.93 (125) | 4.59 (117) | 53.22 (1,352) |
| Average snowfall inches (cm) | 1.1 (2.8) | 1.0 (2.5) | 0.7 (1.8) | 0.0 (0.0) | 0.0 (0.0) | 0.0 (0.0) | 0.0 (0.0) | 0.0 (0.0) | 0.0 (0.0) | 0.0 (0.0) | 0.0 (0.0) | 0.1 (0.25) | 2.9 (7.4) |
| Average precipitation days (≥ 0.01 in) | 7.0 | 7.6 | 9.2 | 8.6 | 9.8 | 8.0 | 7.7 | 6.9 | 6.8 | 7.4 | 7.3 | 8.2 | 94.5 |
| Average snowy days (≥ 0.1 in) | 0.6 | 0.6 | 0.2 | 0.0 | 0.0 | 0.0 | 0.0 | 0.0 | 0.0 | 0.0 | 0.0 | 0.2 | 1.6 |
Source: NOAA

== Demographics ==
Historical population
| Census | Pop. | Note | %± |
|---|---|---|---|
| 1850 | 90 | | — |
| 1870 | 162 | | — |
| 1880 | 289 | | 78.4% |
| 1890 | 487 | | 68.5% |
| 1900 | 487 | | 0.0% |
| 1910 | 900 | | 84.8% |
| 1920 | 918 | | 2.0% |
| 1930 | 1,077 | | 17.3% |
| 1940 | 1,298 | | 20.5% |
| 1950 | 1,292 | | −0.5% |
| 1960 | 1,619 | | 25.3% |
| 1970 | 2,132 | | 31.7% |
| 1980 | 2,642 | | 23.9% |
| 1990 | 3,024 | | 14.5% |
| 2000 | 3,508 | | 16.0% |
| 2010 | 3,618 | | 3.1% |
| 2020 | 3,386 | | −6.4% |
| 2025 (est.) | 3,387 | ▲ | 0.0% |
U.S. Decennial Census

=== 2020 census ===
Waldron racial composition
| Race | Number | Percentage |
|---|---|---|
| White (non-Hispanic) | 2,574 | 76.02% |
| Black or African American (non-Hispanic) | 10 | 0.3% |
| Native American | 38 | 1.12% |
| Asian | 82 | 2.42% |
| Pacific Islander | 1 | 0.03% |
| Other/Mixed | 154 | 4.55% |
| Hispanic or Latino | 527 | 15.56% |

As of the 2020 census, Waldron had a population of 3,386. The median age was 36.0 years. 26.0% of residents were under the age of 18 and 17.9% of residents were 65 years of age or older. For every 100 females there were 97.7 males, and for every 100 females age 18 and over there were 94.9 males age 18 and over.

0.0% of residents lived in urban areas, while 100.0% lived in rural areas.

There were 1,281 households in Waldron, of which 36.3% had children under the age of 18 living in them. Of all households, 40.0% were married-couple households, 20.0% were households with a male householder and no spouse or partner present, and 31.0% were households with a female householder and no spouse or partner present. About 31.0% of all households were made up of individuals and 13.9% had someone living alone who was 65 years of age or older. There were 854 families residing in the city.

There were 1,578 housing units, of which 18.8% were vacant. The homeowner vacancy rate was 3.3% and the rental vacancy rate was 18.1%.

=== 2000 census ===
As of the 2000 census, there were 3,508 people, 1,430 households, and 899 families residing in the city. The population density was 704.4 inhabitants per square mile (272.0/km^{2}). There were 1,563 housing units at an average density of 313.8 per square mile (121.2/km^{2}). The racial makeup of the city was 90.42% White, 0.14% Black or African American, 0.91% Native American, 0.11% Asian, 7.16% from other races, and 1.25% from two or more races. 15.31% of the population were Hispanic or Latino of any race.

There were 1,430 households, out of which 31.3% had children under the age of 18 living with them, 45.9% were married couples living together, 11.3% had a female householder with no husband present, and 37.1% were non-families. 33.0% of all households were made up of individuals, and 16.8% had someone living alone who was 65 years of age or older. The average household size was 2.38 and the average family size was 3.00.

In the city, the population was spread out, with 26.9% under the age of 18, 10.2% from 18 to 24, 25.6% from 25 to 44, 19.6% from 45 to 64, and 17.8% who were 65 years of age or older. The median age was 35 years. For every 100 females, there were 96.6 males. For every 100 females age 18 and over, there were 87.8 males.

The median income for a household in the city was $21,921, and the median income for a family was $26,829. Males had a median income of $25,256 versus $16,136 for females. The per capita income for the city was $12,193. About 22.8% of families and 25.9% of the population were below the poverty line, including 31.1% of those under age 18 and 14.7% of those age 65 or over.

== Education ==
Public education for elementary and secondary school students is primarily provided by the Waldron School District, which leads to graduation from Waldron High School. The district and school mascot and athletic emblem is the Bulldog with orange and black serving as the district and school colors.

== Notable people ==
- Evelyn Ammons, member of the Arkansas House of Representatives
- Doak S. Campbell, founder of Florida State University
- Gary Darnell, college football coach
- James Farley, silent film actor
- Ashley McBryde, country music singer-songwriter
- Terry Rice, State Senator
