= Cleveland School =

Cleveland School may refer to:

- Cleveland School (Clayton, North Carolina), which is listed on the National Register of Historic Places (NRHP)
- Cleveland School of the Arts, a public high school in Cleveland, Ohio
  - Cleveland School (arts community), the artists who achieved success after attending the Cleveland School of Art
- Cleveland School, of Cleveland, Arkansas, whose Cafeteria Building-Cleveland School is NRHP-listed
- Cleveland Court School, Lakeland, Florida, which is NRHP-listed
- Cleveland Institute of Art, a private college in Cleveland, Ohio, that was named Cleveland School of Art from 1891 to 1948

== See also ==
- Cleveland City Schools (disambiguation)
- Cleveland College (disambiguation)
- Cleveland Elementary School (disambiguation)
- Cleveland High School (disambiguation)
- Cleveland Middle School (disambiguation)
- Cleveland school shooting (disambiguation)
- Cleveland University (disambiguation)
