= Trinity Lutheran Church (Atkins, Arkansas) =

Historic church in Arkansas, United States

- U.S. National Register of Historic Places
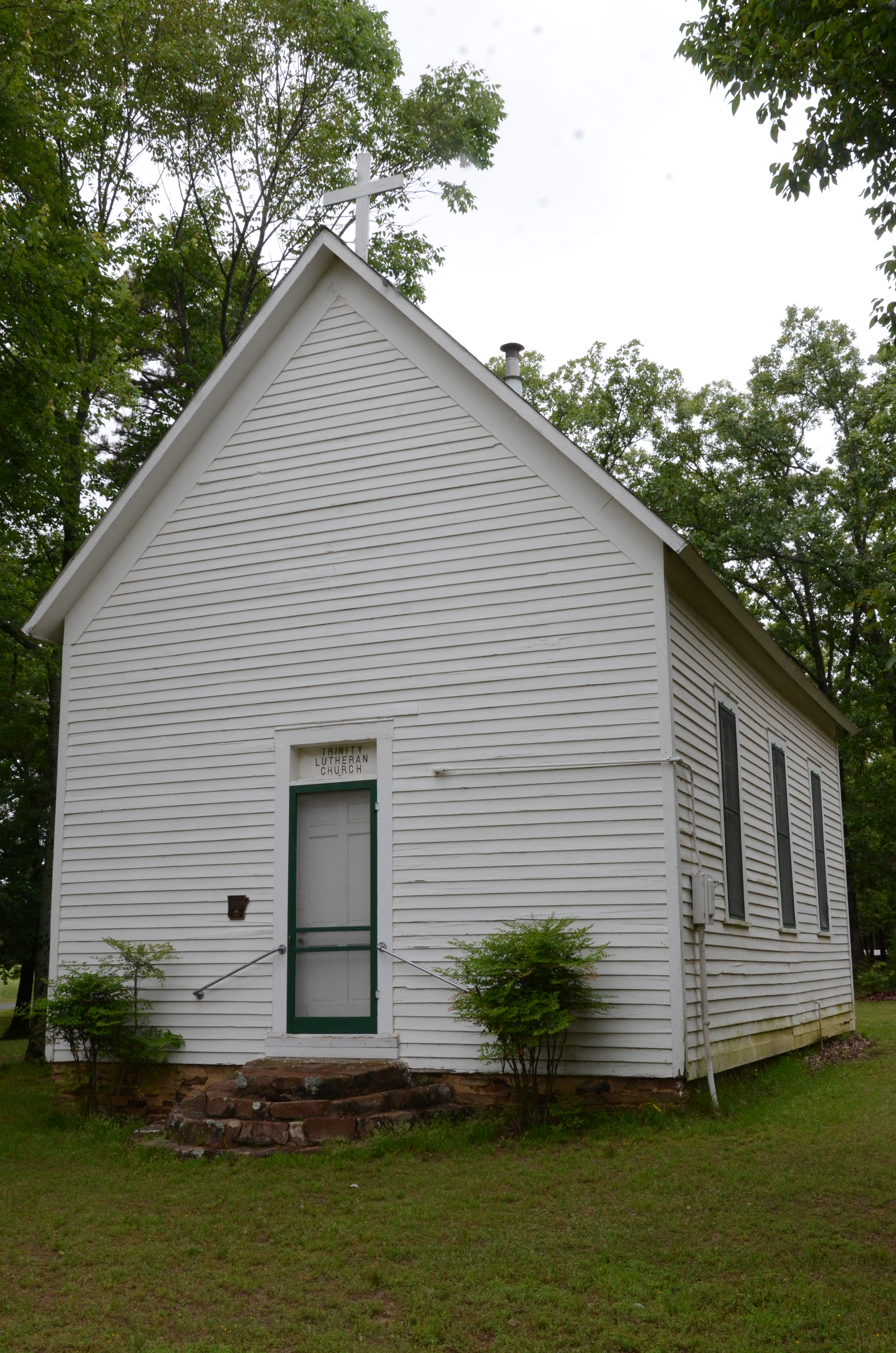

- Location within Arkansas Location within the United States
- Nearest city: On Petit Jean Mountain, near Atkins, Arkansas
- Coordinates: 35°7′58″N 92°55′31″W
- Area: less than one acre
- Built: 1886
- NRHP reference No.: 76000396
- Added to NRHP: December 13, 1976

Trinity Lutheran Church is a historic church near Atkins, Arkansas. It is located east of Winrock and north of Petit Jean State Park, on the east side of Montgomery Trace (County Highway 5). It is a wooden plank-framed structure, with a weatherboard exterior, gabled roof, and cut fieldstone foundation. Its front facade is unadorned except for the entrance, which is simply framed, and the sides each have three sash windows. The interior has original finishes and simple hand-hewn pews. The church was built in 1886, and is one of the oldest Lutheran churches in Arkansas.

The building was listed on the National Register of Historic Places in 1976.

== See also ==
- National Register of Historic Places listings in Conway County, Arkansas
