= National Register of Historic Places listings in Conway County, Arkansas =

Location of Conway County in Arkansas

This is a list of the National Register of Historic Places listings in Conway County, Arkansas.

This is intended to be a complete list of the properties and districts on the National Register of Historic Places in Conway County, Arkansas, United States. The locations of National Register properties and districts for which the latitude and longitude coordinates are included below, may be seen in a map.

There are 60 properties and districts listed on the National Register in the county. Four other sites once listed on the Register have been removed.

Contents: Counties in Arkansas
- Arkansas
- Ashley
- Baxter
- Benton
- Boone
- Bradley
- Calhoun
- Carroll
- Chicot
- Clark
- Clay
- Cleburne
- Cleveland
- Columbia
- Conway
- Craighead
- Crawford
- Crittenden
- Cross
- Dallas
- Desha
- Drew
- Faulkner
- Franklin
- Fulton
- Garland
- Grant
- Greene
- Hempstead
- Hot Spring
- Howard
- Independence
- Izard
- Jackson
- Jefferson
- Johnson
- Lafayette
- Lawrence
- Lee
- Lincoln
- Little River
- Logan
- Lonoke
- Madison
- Marion
- Miller
- Mississippi
- Monroe
- Montgomery
- Nevada
- Newton
- Ouachita
- Perry
- Phillips
- Pike
- Poinsett
- Polk
- Pope
- Prairie
- Pulaski (Little Rock)
- Randolph
- St. Francis
- Saline
- Scott
- Searcy
- Sebastian
- Sevier
- Sharp
- Stone
- Union
- Van Buren
- Washington
- White
- Woodruff
- Yell

This National Park Service list is complete through NPS recent listings posted December 19, 2025.

== Current listings ==
	Name on the Register	Image	Date listed	Location	City or town	Description
1	Arkansas Christian College Administration Building	Arkansas Christian College Administration Building	January 22, 2014 (#13001101)	100 W. Harding St. 35°09′51″N 92°44′36″W	Morrilton	
2	Aycock House	Aycock House	May 13, 1976 (#76000397)	410 W. Church St. 35°09′06″N 92°45′01″W	Morrilton	
3	Bold Pilgrim Cemetery		September 18, 2018 (#100002947)	End of Bold Pilgrim Rd., W of AR 9; 35°14′20″N 92°41′23″W	Morrilton vicinity	
4	Cafeteria Building-Cleveland School	Cafeteria Building-Cleveland School	September 10, 1992 (#92001194)	County Road 511; 35°23′27″N 92°42′41″W	Cleveland	
5	Cedar Creek Bridge	Cedar Creek Bridge	April 9, 1990 (#90000520)	Off Highway 154, over Cedar Creek at Roosevelt Lake; 35°07′43″N 92°55′30″W	Petit Jean State Park	
6	Chapel of the Transfiguration		January 18, 2022 (#100007356)	10 Keller Way; 35°07′43″N 92°51′26″W	Morrilton vicinity	
7	Coca-Cola Building	Coca-Cola Building	December 22, 1982 (#82000803)	211 N. Moose; 35°09′15″N 92°44′35″W	Morrilton	
8	Community Mausoleum, Elmwood Cemetery		September 27, 2019 (#100004436)	1148 W. Church St. 35°09′15″N 92°45′43″W	Morrilton	
9	Conway County Courthouse	Conway County Courthouse	November 13, 1989 (#89001960)	Moose St. at Church St. 35°09′05″N 92°44′37″W	Morrilton	
10	Conway County Library	Conway County Library	April 15, 1978 (#78000581)	101 W. Church St. 35°09′04″N 92°44′45″W	Morrilton	
11	Cox House	Cox House	October 22, 1974 (#74000471)	Bridge St. 35°08′30″N 92°44′06″W	Morrilton	
12	Earl Building	Earl Building	January 22, 2009 (#08001336)	201 N. St. Joseph St. 35°09′12″N 92°44′28″W	Morrilton	
13	Elmwood Cemetery Historic Section		September 27, 2019 (#100004438)	W. of AR 113 and W. Church St. intersection 35°09′10″N 92°45′31″W	Morrilton	
14	First National Bank of Morrilton	First National Bank of Morrilton	December 22, 1982 (#82000804)	Main at Moose St. 35°09′10″N 92°44′38″W	Morrilton	
15	Grotto, Petit Jean No. 8	Grotto, Petit Jean No. 8	May 4, 1982 (#82002100)	Address Restricted	Oppelo	
16	Hardison Shelter, Petit Jean No. 3	Hardison Shelter, Petit Jean No. 3	May 4, 1982 (#82002101)	Address Restricted	Oppelo	
17	Highway A-1 Bridge		January 11, 2021 (#100006022)	Old US 64 west of Hivilies Dr. 35°09′25″N 92°37′36″W	Plumerville	
18	I-40 Overpass		September 15, 2021 (#100006920)	Fish Lake Rd. over I-40; 35°13′09″N 92°49′48″W	Blackwell	
19	Indian Cave, Petit Jean No. 1	Indian Cave, Petit Jean No. 1	May 4, 1982 (#82002102)	Address Restricted	Oppelo	
20	Little Rock to Cantonment Gibson Road-Old Wire Road Segment	Little Rock to Cantonment Gibson Road-Old Wire Road Segment	March 27, 2008 (#07001465)	Old Wire Rd., southwest of Blackwell; 35°12′47″N 92°50′45″W	Blackwell	A Trail of Tears site
21	Mallettown United Methodist Church	Mallettown United Methodist Church	February 15, 2005 (#05000041)	274 Mallett Town Rd. 35°17′02″N 92°29′23″W	Mallet Town	
22	Menifee High School Gymnasium	Menifee High School Gymnasium	June 6, 2002 (#02000601)	Junction of N. Park St. and E. Mustang St. 35°08′50″N 92°32′48″W	Menifee	
23	Moose Addition Neighborhood Historic District	Moose Addition Neighborhood Historic District	September 13, 2013 (#13000349)	Roughly bounded by W. Valley, S. Moose, Green, Brown & S. Division Sts.; also Roughly bounded by S. St. Joseph, E. Green, S. Chestnut, E. Valley, S. Morrill & E. Church Sts. 35°08′59″N 92°44′49″W	Morrilton	Second set of addresses represents a boundary increase May 26, 2015.
24	Moose House	Moose House	October 22, 1974 (#74000472)	711 Green St. 35°08′56″N 92°44′15″W	Morrilton	
25	Morrilton Commercial Historic District	Morrilton Commercial Historic District	March 7, 2003 (#03000085)	Roughly bounded by E. Railroad, Broadway, N. Division, and N. Moose Sts. 35°09′13″N 92°44′39″W	Morrilton	
26	Morrilton Post Office	Morrilton Post Office	August 14, 1998 (#98000921)	117 N. Division St. 35°09′14″N 92°44′42″W	Morrilton	
27	Morrilton Railroad Station	Morrilton Railroad Station	September 13, 1977 (#77000249)	Railroad Ave. between Division and Moose Sts. 35°08′55″N 92°44′40″W	Morrilton	
28	Museum of Automobiles	Museum of Automobiles	May 31, 2019 (#100003990)	8 Jones Ln. 35°07′46″N 92°53′28″W	Winrock vicinity	
29	Old US 64, Menifee Segment	Old US 64, Menifee Segment	March 2, 2006 (#06000071)	Canal Rd., approximately 0.5 miles southeast of U.S. Route 64; 35°08′52″N 92°33′16″W	Menifee	
30	Petit Jean No. 4	Petit Jean No. 4	May 4, 1982 (#82002105)	Address Restricted	Oppelo	
31	Petit Jean No. 5	Petit Jean No. 5	May 4, 1982 (#82002106)	Address Restricted	Oppelo	
32	Petit Jean No. 6	Petit Jean No. 6	May 4, 1982 (#82002107)	Address Restricted	Oppelo	
33	Petit Jean No. 7	Petit Jean No. 7	May 4, 1982 (#82002108)	Address Restricted	Oppelo	
34	Petit Jean No. 9	Petit Jean No. 9	May 4, 1982 (#82002109)	Address Restricted	Oppelo	
35	Petit Jean No. 10	Petit Jean No. 10	May 4, 1982 (#82002103)	Address Restricted	Oppelo	
36	Petit Jean No. 11	Petit Jean No. 11	May 4, 1982 (#82002104)	Address Restricted	Oppelo	
37	Petit Jean State Park-Administration Office	Petit Jean State Park-Administration Office	May 28, 1992 (#92000520)	Highway 154 east of Bench Mark 914 in Petit Jean State Park; 35°07′39″N 92°55′09″W	Winrock	
38	Petit Jean State Park-Blue Hole Road District	Petit Jean State Park-Blue Hole Road District	May 28, 1992 (#92000513)	Blue Hole Rd. in Petit Jean State Park; 35°07′17″N 92°57′16″W	Winrock	
39	Petit Jean State Park-Cabin No. 1	Petit Jean State Park-Cabin No. 1	May 28, 1992 (#92000523)	Campground access road in Petit Jean State Park; 35°07′05″N 92°56′13″W	Winrock	
40	Petit Jean State Park-Cabin No. 6	Petit Jean State Park-Cabin No. 6	May 28, 1992 (#92000524)	Campground access road in Petit Jean State Park; 35°07′07″N 92°56′15″W	Winrock	
41	Petit Jean State Park-Cabin No. 9	Petit Jean State Park-Cabin No. 9	May 28, 1992 (#92000525)	Campground access road in Petit Jean State Park; 35°07′08″N 92°56′20″W	Winrock	
42	Petit Jean State Park-Cabin No. 16	Petit Jean State Park-Cabin No. 16	May 28, 1992 (#92000522)	Campground access road in Petit Jean State Park; 35°07′07″N 92°56′21″W	Winrock	
43	Petit Jean State Park-Cedar Falls Trail Historic District	Petit Jean State Park-Cedar Falls Trail Historic District	May 28, 1992 (#92000514)	Adjacent to the main access road in Petit Jean State Park; 35°07′01″N 92°56′30″W	Winrock	
44	Petit Jean State Park-Concrete Log Bridge	Petit Jean State Park-Concrete Log Bridge	May 28, 1992 (#92000519)	Highway 154 south of Bench Mark 914 in Petit Jean State Park; 35°07′34″N 92°55′29″W	Winrock	
45	Petit Jean State Park-Culvert No. 1	Petit Jean State Park-Culvert No. 1	May 28, 1992 (#92000518)	Highway 154 in Petit Jean State Park; 35°07′05″N 92°55′58″W	Winrock	
46	Petit Jean State Park-Lake Bailey-Roosevelt Lake Historic District	Petit Jean State Park-Lake Bailey-Roosevelt Lake Historic District	May 28, 1992 (#92000515)	East and north of Highway 154 in Petit Jean State Park; 35°07′45″N 92°54′54″W	Winrock	
47	Petit Jean State Park-Mather Lodge	Petit Jean State Park-Mather Lodge	May 28, 1992 (#92000521)	Main access road in Petit Jean State Park; 35°07′02″N 92°56′18″W	Petit Jean State Park	
48	Petit Jean State Park-Office Headquarters	Petit Jean State Park-Office Headquarters	May 28, 1992 (#92000516)	Highway 154, approximately 500 feet south of Bench Mark 914 in Petit Jean State Park; 35°07′35″N 92°55′34″W	Winrock	
49	Petit Jean State Park-Water Treatment Building	Petit Jean State Park-Water Treatment Building	May 28, 1992 (#92000517)	On a dirt access road south of its junction with Highway 154, approximately 800 feet east of Bench Mark 914 in Petit Jean State Park; 35°07′31″N 92°55′20″W	Winrock	
50	Plumerville School Building	Plumerville School Building	September 10, 1992 (#92001193)	Arnold St. 35°09′30″N 92°38′03″W	Plumerville	
51	Plummer's Station	Plummer's Station	August 11, 1975 (#75000378)	South of Plumerville on Gap Creek; 35°09′21″N 92°38′33″W	Plumerville	
52	Point Remove Creek Bridge		September 27, 2019 (#100004442)	Old Arkansas Highway 113 over Point Remove Creek; 35°09′47″N 92°48′14″W	Morrilton	
53	Rockhouse Cave, Petit Jean No. 2	Rockhouse Cave, Petit Jean No. 2	May 4, 1982 (#82002110)	Address Restricted	Oppelo	
54	Saint Anthony's Hospital	Saint Anthony's Hospital	March 28, 1986 (#86000581)	202 E. Green St. 35°08′51″N 92°44′37″W	Morrilton	
55	Seven Hollows-Petit Jean Mountain Site #1		September 20, 2006 (#06000833)	Southeast of the junction of Highways 154 and 155 in Petit Jean State Park; 35°06′37″N 92°56′53″W	Winrock	
56	Stuckey's (Plumerville)		March 9, 2022 (#100007319)	304 North Springfield St. 35°09′40″N 92°38′28″W	Plumerville	
57	Trinity Lutheran Church	Trinity Lutheran Church	December 13, 1976 (#76000396)	7.2 miles south of Atkins off Highway 154; 35°07′58″N 92°55′31″W	Atkins	
58	Union Chapel School and Shop Building	Union Chapel School and Shop Building	January 26, 2016 (#15000993)	298 Union Chapel Rd. & 28 Acker Ln. 35°13′55″N 92°33′21″W	Springfield vicinity	
59	West Church Street Historic District	West Church Street Historic District	May 25, 2015 (#15000259)	Roughly bounded by S. Morrill, Valley, S. Cherokee & W. Church Sts. 35°09′04″N 92°44′54″W	Morrilton	
60	W. L. Wood House	W. L. Wood House	June 6, 2002 (#02000604)	709 N. Morrill St. 35°09′40″N 92°44′46″W	Morrilton	

== Former listings ==
	Name on the Register	Image	Date listed	Date removed	Location	City or town	Description
1	Cove Creek Bridge		May 24, 2004 (#04000499)	January 24, 2017	Highway 124; 35°19′23″N 92°29′08″W	Martinville	Replaced in 2011.
2	Morrilton Colored School	Morrilton Colored School	May 23, 2014 (#14000245)	September 29, 2015	906 W. Rock St. 35°09′32″N 92°45′14″W	Morrilton	Destroyed in a fire in 2015.
3	Morrilton Male and Female College		August 3, 1979 (#79000436)	September 17, 1999	E. Church St.	Morrilton	
4	Sims Hotel		August 28, 1975 (#75000379)	March 31, 2000	Center of Plumerville; 35°09′29″N 92°38′33″W	Plumerville	
5	Solgohachia Bridge	Solgohachia Bridge	May 26, 2004 (#04000498)	January 27, 2012	County Road 67; 35°16′17″N 92°42′48″W	Solgohachia	Destroyed by overweight truck April 11, 2011.

== See also ==
- List of National Historic Landmarks in Arkansas
- National Register of Historic Places listings in Arkansas
