= Cleveland Elementary School =

Cleveland Elementary School may refer to:

- Cleveland Elementary School (Spartanburg, South Carolina)
- Cleveland Elementary School (San Diego, California), which was the site of a school shooting in 1979
- Cleveland Elementary School (Stockton, California), which was the site of a school shooting in 1989
- Elementary schools in Cleveland:
  - Cleveland, Ohio, public elementary schools, see Cleveland Metropolitan School District
  - Cleveland, Mississippi, public elementary schools, see Cleveland School District
  - Cleveland County, England, public primary schools, see List of schools in Redcar and Cleveland

== See also ==
- Cleveland Elementary School shooting (disambiguation)
- Cleveland School (disambiguation)
