= Lake Bailey–Roosevelt Lake Historic District =

Historic district in Arkansas, United States

- Petit Jean State Park–Lake Bailey–Roosevelt Lake Historic District
- U.S. National Register of Historic Places
- U.S. Historic district
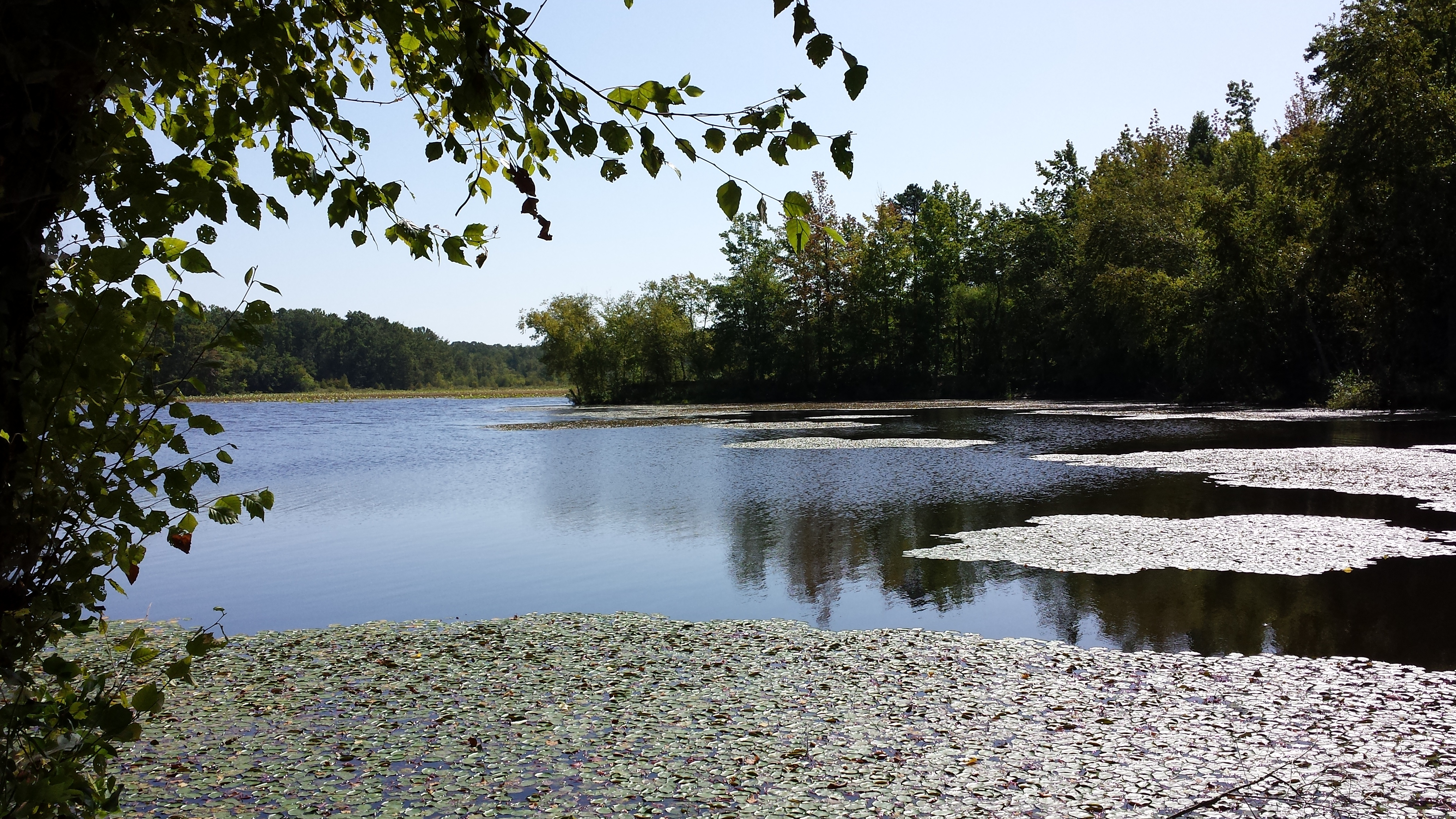

- Location within Arkansas Location within the United States
- Nearest city: Winrock, Arkansas
- Coordinates: 35°7′45″N 92°54′54″W
- Area: 170 acres (69 ha)
- Built: 1935
- Built by: Civilian Conservation Corps
- Architectural style: Rustic
- MPS: Facilities Constructed by the CCC in Arkansas MPS
- NRHP reference No.: 92000515
- Added to NRHP: May 28, 1992

The Lake Bailey–Roosevelt Lake Historic District encompasses a landscape and buildings developed by the Civilian Conservation Corps in Petit Jean State Park, Conway County, Arkansas. The district includes both Lake Bailey and Roosevelt Lake, man-made by CCC-built dams, along with the waterfall between the two, as well as a boathouse, shelter and bathhouse, and the Cedar Creek Bridge, which crosses Roosevelt Lake at its outlet. A unique artistic feature built by the CCC are a series of what appear to be wooden stumps poking out of Roosevelt Lake, which are actually built out of concrete. These facilities were built about 1935, and form a subset of park's surviving CCC architecture.

The district was listed on the National Register of Historic Places in 1992.

== See also ==
- National Register of Historic Places listings in Conway County, Arkansas
