= Menifee High School Gymnasium =

- U.S. National Register of Historic Places
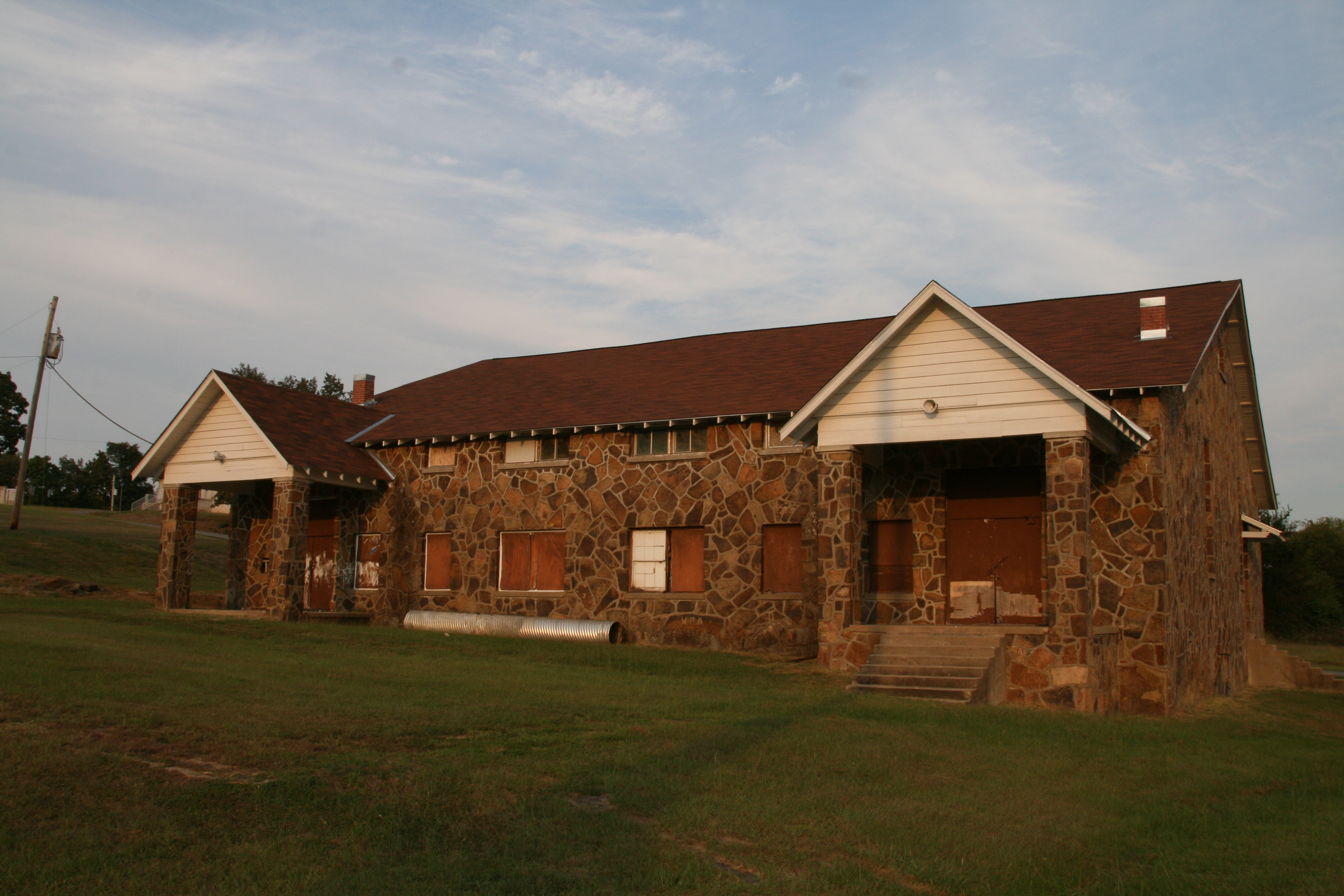

- Location within Arkansas Location within the United States
- Location: Jct. of N. Park St. and E. Mustang St., Menifee, Arkansas
- Coordinates: 35°8′50″N 92°32′48″W
- Area: less than one acre
- Built: 1938
- Built by: Works Progress Administration
- Architectural style: Bungalow/American craftsman
- MPS: Public Schools in the Ozarks MPS
- NRHP reference No.: 02000601
- Added to NRHP: June 6, 2002

The Menifee High School Gymnasium is a historic school building at North Park and East Mustang Streets in Menifee, Arkansas. It is a single-story frame structure, its exterior finished in uncoursed fieldstone veneer. It has a gabled roof with exposed rafter ends, and two entry pavilions with gable roofs supported by stone posts. It was built in 1938 with funding support from the Works Progress Administration, and was one of the first three WPA-funded athletic facilities built specifically for a segregated African-American school.

The building was listed on the National Register of Historic Places in 2002.

== See also ==
- National Register of Historic Places listings in Conway County, Arkansas
