= Museum of Automobiles =

- Established: 1964; 62 years ago
- Location: Morrilton, Arkansas, USA
- Coordinates: 35.129445°N 92.891089°W
- Type: Automobile museum
- Website: www.museumofautos.com
- Museum of Automobiles
- U.S. National Register of Historic Places
- Location: 8 Jones Lane
- Architect: Ginocchio, Cromwell, Carter, Dees, and Neyland
- NRHP reference No.: 100003990
- Added to NRHP: May 31, 2019

The Museum of Automobiles is an automobile museum in rural unincorporated Winrock, Arkansas, adjacent to Petit Jean State Park. The museum features a collection of antique and classic cars, motorcycles, guns, license plates, arcade machines and automobile memorabilia. It also includes a rare 1923 Climber touring car, made in Arkansas. It was listed on the National Register of Historic Places in 2019.

The museum hosts many automobile-related events including swap meets and car shows.

== History ==
Opened in 1964, the museum was founded by Winthrop Rockefeller before he became Governor of Arkansas. The museum housed Rockefeller's collection of antique and classic cars until his death, and in 1975 the collection was sold to collector Bill Harrah for $947,000, which included 68 motorized vehicles and three that were horse-drawn. The museum building, designed by the Little Rock firm of Ginocchio, Carter, Cromwell and Neylan, and 57-acre grounds were donated to the Arkansas Department of Parks and Tourism.

A new non-profit corporation was formed and reopened the Museum in 1976 with cars on loan from collectors around the country, leasing the building from the state.

== Collection ==
Today the museum features over 30 automobiles that were donated to the collection. It also retains several cars from Rockefeller's personal vehicles: the 1951 Cadillac that he drove to Arkansas when he made the state his home, his 1967 Cadillac limousine with a Santa Gertrudis bull sterling silver hood ornament, and his 1914 Cretors popcorn wagon.

== See also ==
- List of museums in Arkansas
- National Register of Historic Places listings in Conway County, Arkansas
