= Archaeological sites in Petit Jean State Park =

Archaeological sites in Arkansas, United States

- Rockhouse Cave, Petit Jean No. 2
- U.S. National Register of Historic Places
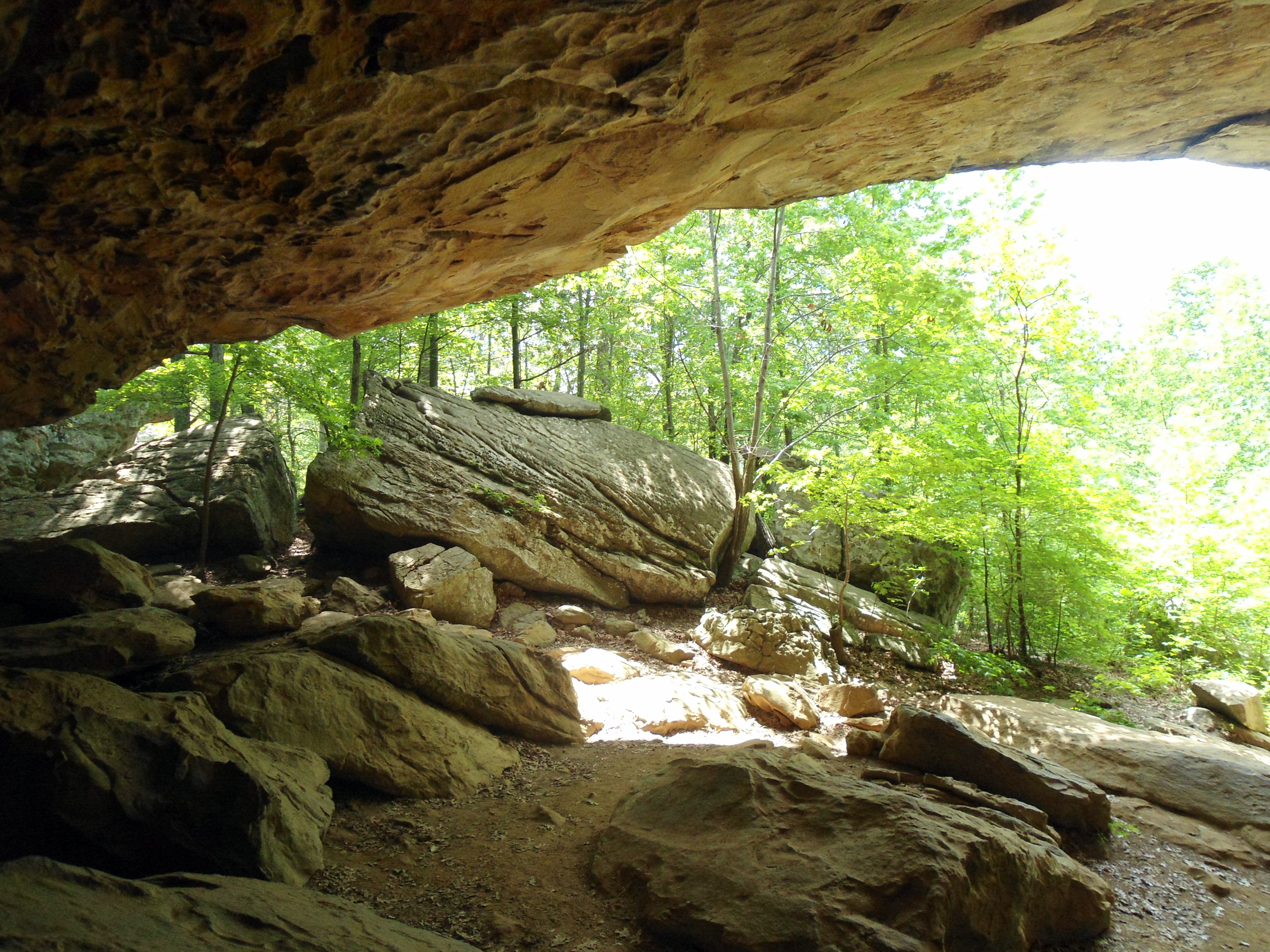
- The Rock House
- Location: Petit Jean State Park, Conway County, Arkansas
- Area: 0.1 acres (0.040 ha)
- MPS: Rock Art Sites in Arkansas TR
- NRHP reference No.: 82002110
- Added to NRHP: May 4, 1982

Petit Jean State Park is the oldest state park in Arkansas. It is located in the central northern part of the state, in western Conway County, atop Petit Jean Mountain, a ridge between the Ozark and Ouachita Mountains. One of the features the park is noted for is prehistoric rock art, some of which is accessible to park visitors via its hiking trails. A total of twelve such sites have been listed on the National Register of Historic Places for their importance. Most of the rock art has been dated to about 1500 CE, and is not obviously associated with habitation sites or other sites bearing evidence of other Native American activities.

== Rockhouse Cave ==
Rockhouse Cave is the largest documented site in the park. It is accessible via the Rock House Cave Trail off Arkansas Highway 154. The cave, actually just a partially covered rock shelter, has faint pictographs on the ceiling near the rear of the shelter. The images are similar to those found at other sites in the park, and include an anthropomorphic figure.

== Indian Cave ==
This site has the largest number figures in the park after Rockhouse Cave. Also a rock shelter, the paintings found here are typical of the distinctive style now designated the "Petit Jean style".

== Grotto ==
The Grotto is located on the Seven Hollows Trail, south of Highway 154. The site includes an anthropomorphic figure and one that appears to be a quadruped of some sort.

== Hardison Shelter ==
The Hardison Shelter site contains an unusually large number of sun motif depictions. This symbol, either circular or spiraled, is a common feature found in many Arkansas rock art sites, and is typically associated with the Mississippian culture.

== Other sites ==
The Seven Hollows/Petit Jean Mountain Site #1 (designated by the Smithsonian trinomial 3CN168) consists of three pictographs that have experienced only minimal weathering. Petit Jean #4 (3CH125) is a pictograph depicting a beaver. Petit Jean #5 (3CN126) is a highly abstract pictograph where it is unclear exactly what it represents. Petit Jean #6 (3CN127) has rayed pictographs that are stylistically similar to those found in the Pictograph Cave in Stone County, a connection that is not well understood.

Petit Jean #7 (3CN128) is a pictograph with a round or oval shape, surrounded by dots. It is similar to other pictographs in the park, and may be a variant of a sun motif. Petit Jean #9 (3CN130) is under a rock overhang, and has a spiral motif that is common across the eastern United States. Petit Jean #10 (3CN131) is a series of painted concentric circles. Petit Jean #11 (3CN132) has an elongated sunburst pattern, and a pattern of wavy lines.

== See also ==
- National Register of Historic Places listings in Conway County, Arkansas
