= Mather Lodge =

- Petit Jean State Park-Mather Lodge
- U.S. National Register of Historic Places
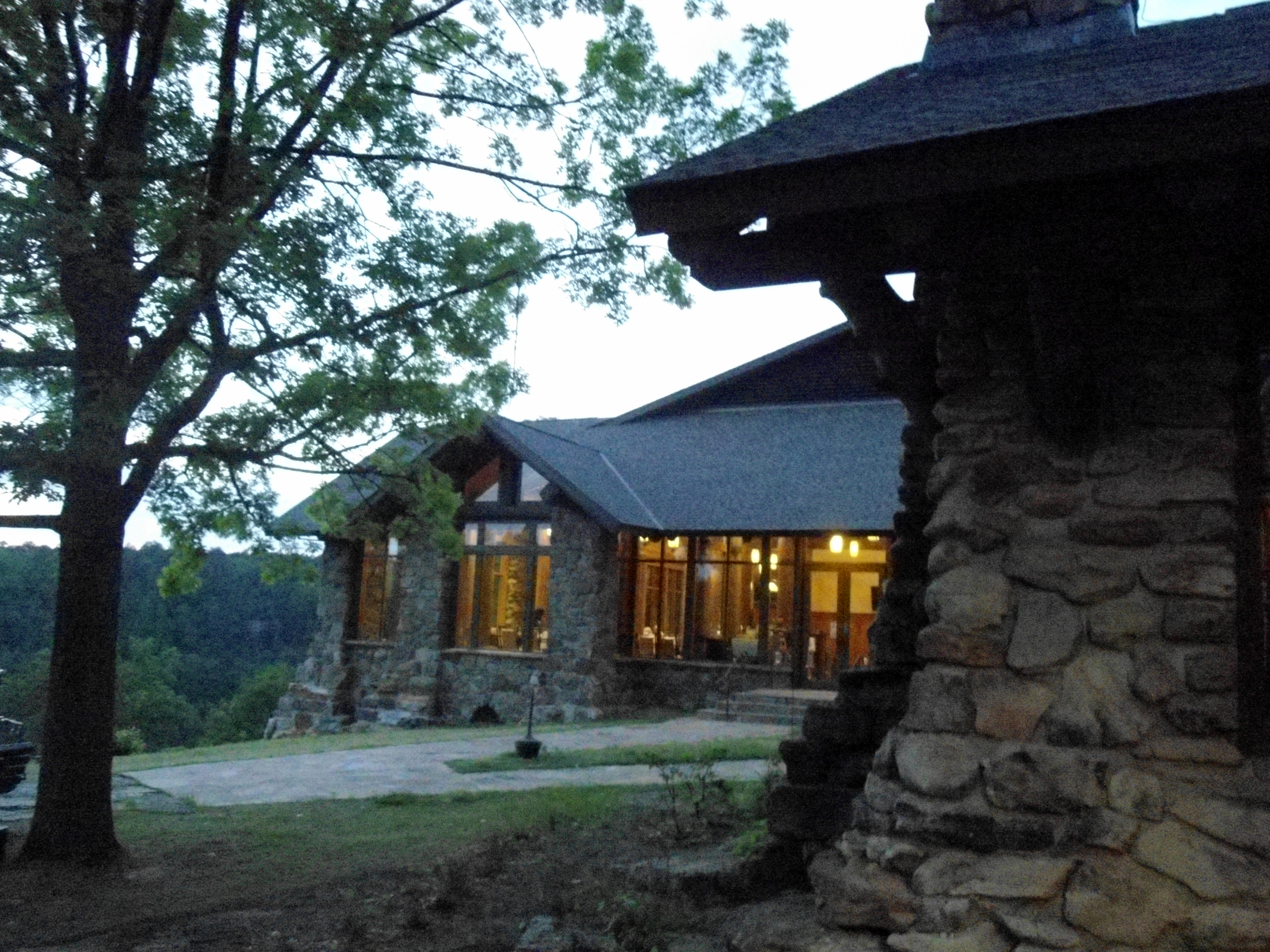

- Location within Arkansas Location within the United States
- Nearest city: Winrock, Arkansas
- Coordinates: 35°7′2″N 92°56′18″W
- Area: 2 acres (0.81 ha)
- Built: 1935
- Built by: Civilian Conservation Corps
- Architectural style: Rustic
- MPS: Facilities Constructed by the CCC in Arkansas MPS
- NRHP reference No.: 92000521
- Added to NRHP: May 28, 1992

Mather Lodge is a historic park facility at Petit Jean State Park in Conway County, Arkansas. It is the centerpiece of the park's developed infrastructure, providing lodging, a meeting and function space, and a restaurant for park visitors. The lodge was built in 1935 by a crew of the Civilian Conservation Corps, and is one of the fine examples of the CCC architecture of Petit Jean State Park. It is built in the Rustic style for which the CCC became well known.

The lodge was listed on the National Register of Historic Places in 1992.

== See also ==
- National Register of Historic Places listings in Conway County, Arkansas
