= Cleveland High School =

Grover Cleveland High School or Cleveland High School is the name of several public high schools in the United States, named—except as noted—for President Grover Cleveland:

- Grover Cleveland High School (New Jersey), Caldwell, New Jersey
- Grover Cleveland High School (Buffalo, New York), Buffalo, New York
- Grover Cleveland High School (Queens), Queens, New York
- Cleveland High School (Los Angeles), Los Angeles, California
- Cleveland High School (Cleveland, Mississippi), Cleveland, Mississippi
- Cleveland High School (St. Louis, Missouri), St. Louis, Missouri
- Cleveland High School (North Carolina), Clayton, North Carolina, named for the community of Cleveland
- Cleveland High School (Portland, Oregon), Portland, Oregon
- Cleveland High School (Tennessee), Cleveland, Tennessee, named for its location
- Cleveland High School (Seattle), Seattle, Washington
- V. Sue Cleveland High School, Rio Rancho, New Mexico, named for a local school official
- high schools in Cleveland
  - Cleveland, Ohio, public high schools, see Cleveland Metropolitan School District
  - Cleveland, Mississippi, public high schools, see Cleveland School District
  - Cleveland County, England, public secondary schools, see List of schools in Redcar and Cleveland

== See also ==
- Cleveland School (disambiguation)
- Cleveland Hill High School, Cheektowaga, New York
