= Sims Hotel =

- Formerly listed on the U.S. National Register of Historic Places
- Location within Arkansas Location within the United States
- Location: Center of Plumerville, Plumerville, Arkansas
- Coordinates: 35°9′29″N 92°38′33″W
- Area: less than one acre
- Built: 1881
- NRHP reference No.: 75000379

Significant dates
- Added to NRHP: August 28, 1975
- Removed from NRHP: March 31, 2000

The Sims Hotel was a historic hotel in Plumerville, Arkansas. Located in the town center, it was the last surviving remnant of the town's early heyday as a railroad community. Built in 1860s as a private residence, it was converted to a hotel when the railroad arrived in the 1870s, and was decorated with then-fashionable Gothic gingerbread trim on its two-story porch. It was the only railroad-oriented hotel to survive fires that swept the city's downtown in the early 20th century.

The building was listed on the National Register of Historic Places in 1975. It has apparently been demolished, and was delisted in 2000.

== See also ==
- National Register of Historic Places listings in Conway County, Arkansas
