= Plummer's Station =

Historic house in Arkansas, United States

- U.S. National Register of Historic Places
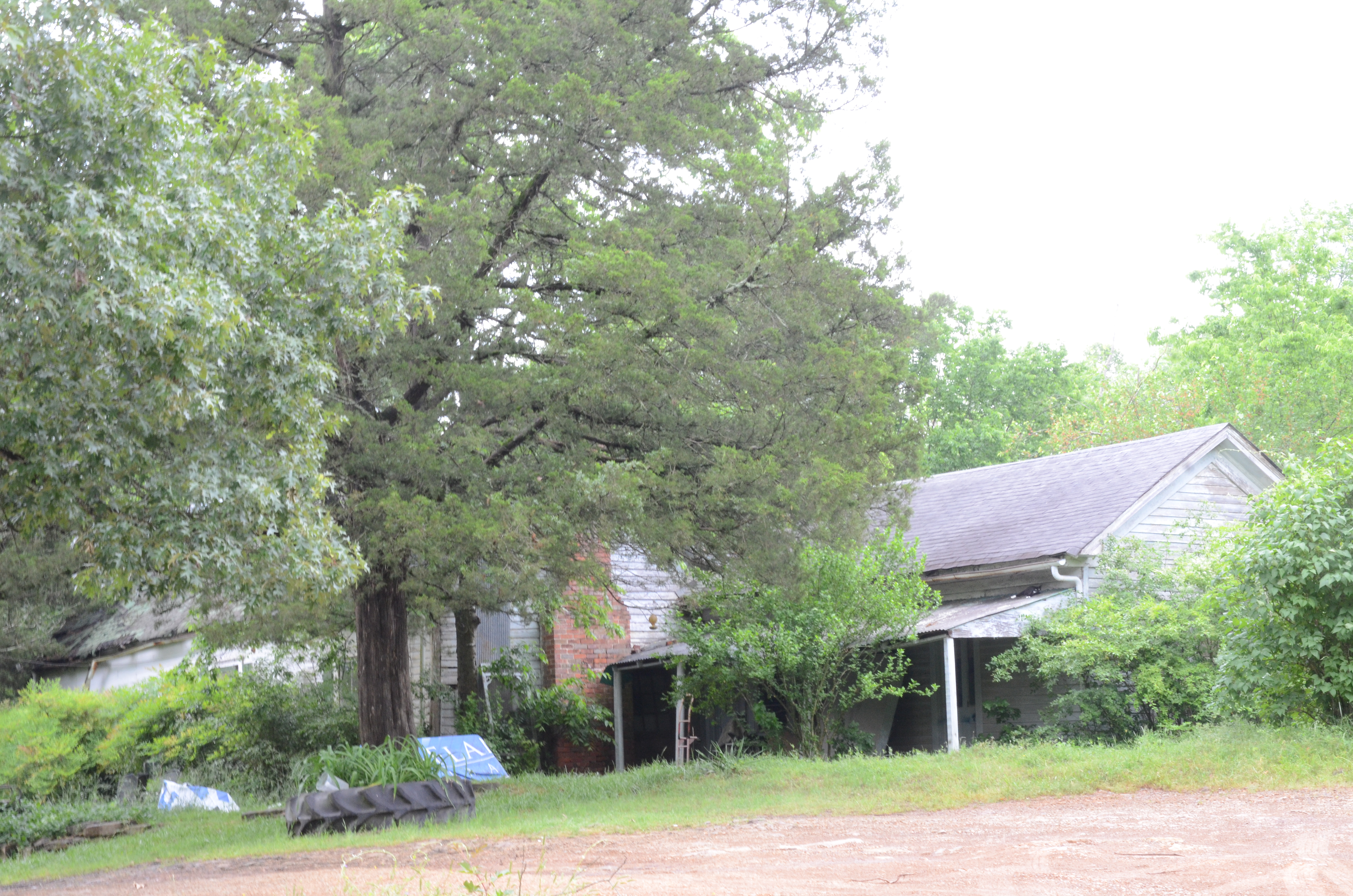

- Location within Arkansas Location within the United States
- Nearest city: On Gap Creek, south of Plumerville, Arkansas
- Coordinates: 35°9′21″N 92°38′33″W
- Area: less than one acre
- Built: 1830
- NRHP reference No.: 75000378
- Added to NRHP: August 11, 1975

Plummer's Station is a historic house on Gap Creek south of Plumerville in Conway County, Arkansas. Built about 1830 and altered several times since, it is one of the oldest surviving structures in the county. At its core is a log cabin, built by Samuel Plummer, and served as a stop on the stagecoach route between Little Rock and Fort Smith in the 19th century. The building is currently falling apart due to a lack of funding to repair it. As it sits this historical site will not last much longer. In appearance it is now an L-shaped single-story structure, sheathed in clapboards.

The house was listed on the National Register of Historic Places in 1975.

== See also ==
- National Register of Historic Places listings in Conway County, Arkansas
