= Plumerville School Building =

- U.S. National Register of Historic Places
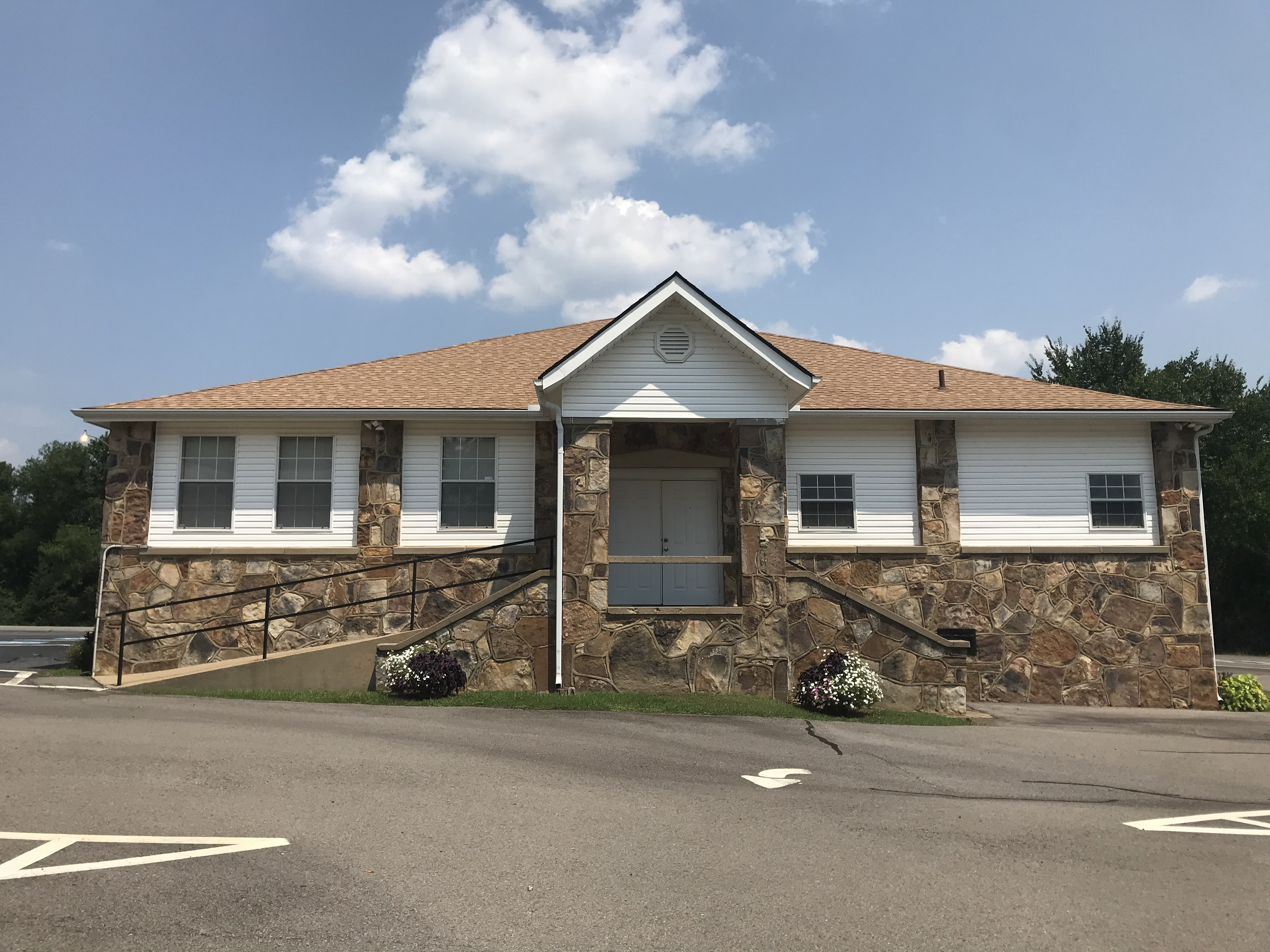

- Location within Arkansas Location within the United States
- Location: Arnold St. Plumerville, Arkansas
- Coordinates: 35°9′30″N 92°38′3″W
- Area: less than one acre
- Built by: Works Progress Administration
- Architectural style: Late 19th and Early 20th Century American Movements, Plain Traditional
- MPS: Public Schools in the Ozarks MPS
- NRHP reference No.: 92001193
- Added to NRHP: September 10, 1992

The Plumerville School Building is a historic school building on Arnold Street in Plumerville, Arkansas. It is a single-story wood-frame structure, finished with local fieldstone and covered by a gable roof. Gabled entry pavilions project from the front, supported by stone posts. It is believed that this structure was built for an African-American church congregation about 1925, with a wooden exterior, and was finished in stone during the 1930s by a Works Progress Administration crew.

The building was listed on the National Register of Historic Places in 1992.

== See also ==
- National Register of Historic Places listings in Conway County, Arkansas
