= Union Chapel School and Shop Building =

- U.S. National Register of Historic Places
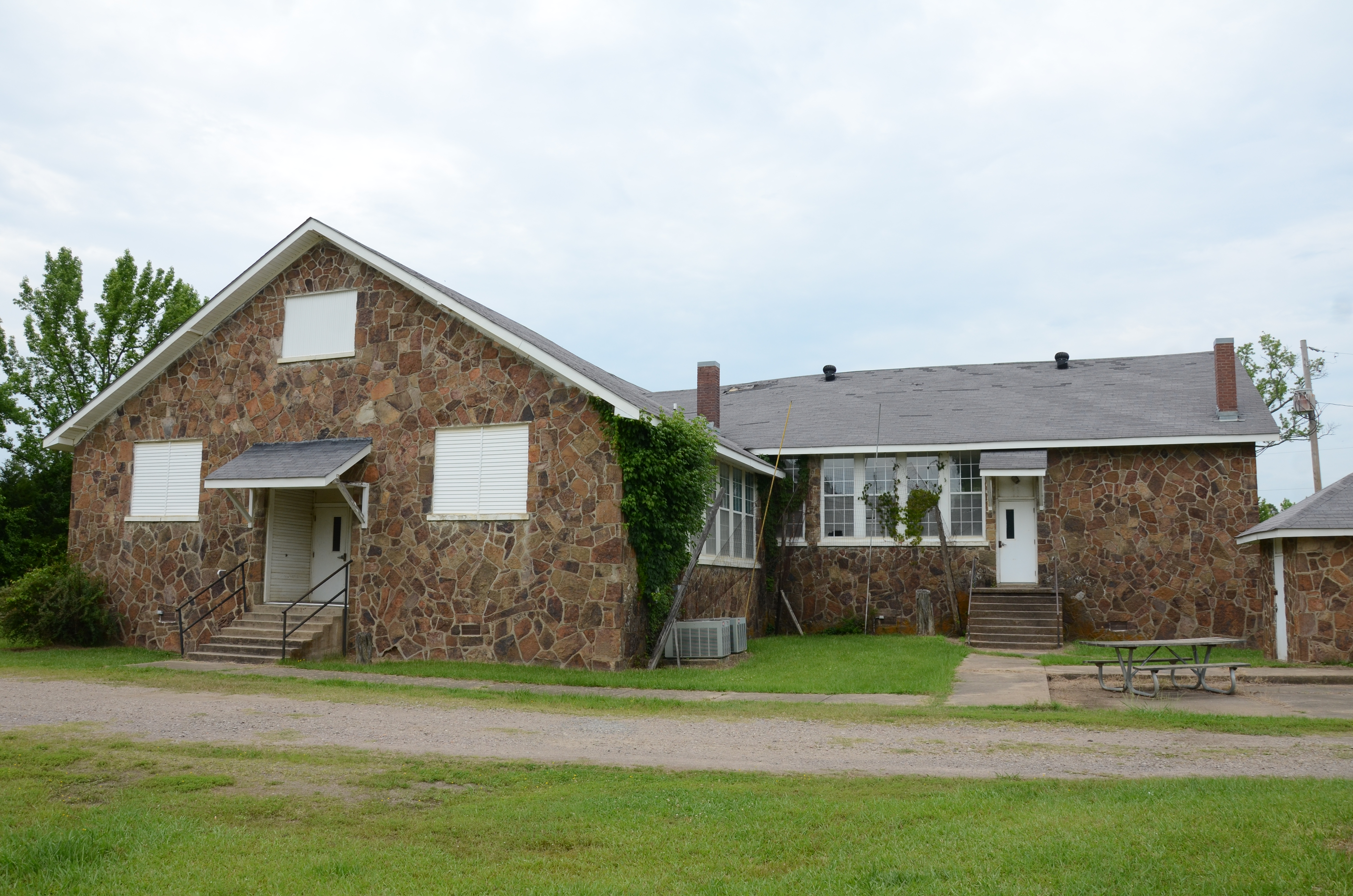

- Location within Arkansas Location within the United States
- Location: 298 Union Chapel Rd. & 28 Acker Ln., near Springfield, Arkansas
- Coordinates: 35°13′55″N 92°33′21″W
- Area: less than one acre
- Built: 1937
- Built by: Works Progress Administration
- Architectural style: Bungalow/craftsman
- MPS: Public Schools in the Ozarks MPS
- NRHP reference No.: 15000993
- Added to NRHP: January 26, 2016

The Union Chapel School and Shop Building is a historic school complex in rural Conway County, Arkansas. It is located at the junction of Union Chapel Road and Acker Lane, about 2.5 miles (4.0 km) south of Springfield. It consists of three buildings: a classroom, shop building, and pump house. The classroom building is a stone single-story structure, with a gable roof, and bands of sash windows flanking the main entrance, which is set in a rounded-arch opening. The shop building is also stone, and is covered by a hip roof. The shop building was one of several built on the grounds in the late 1920s with funding from the Rosenwald Fund, and is the only one from that period to survive. The classroom building was built in 1937–38 with funding from the Works Progress Administration, replacing one of the Rosenwald buildings that had burned down.

The building was listed on the National Register of Historic Places in 2016.

== Gallery ==
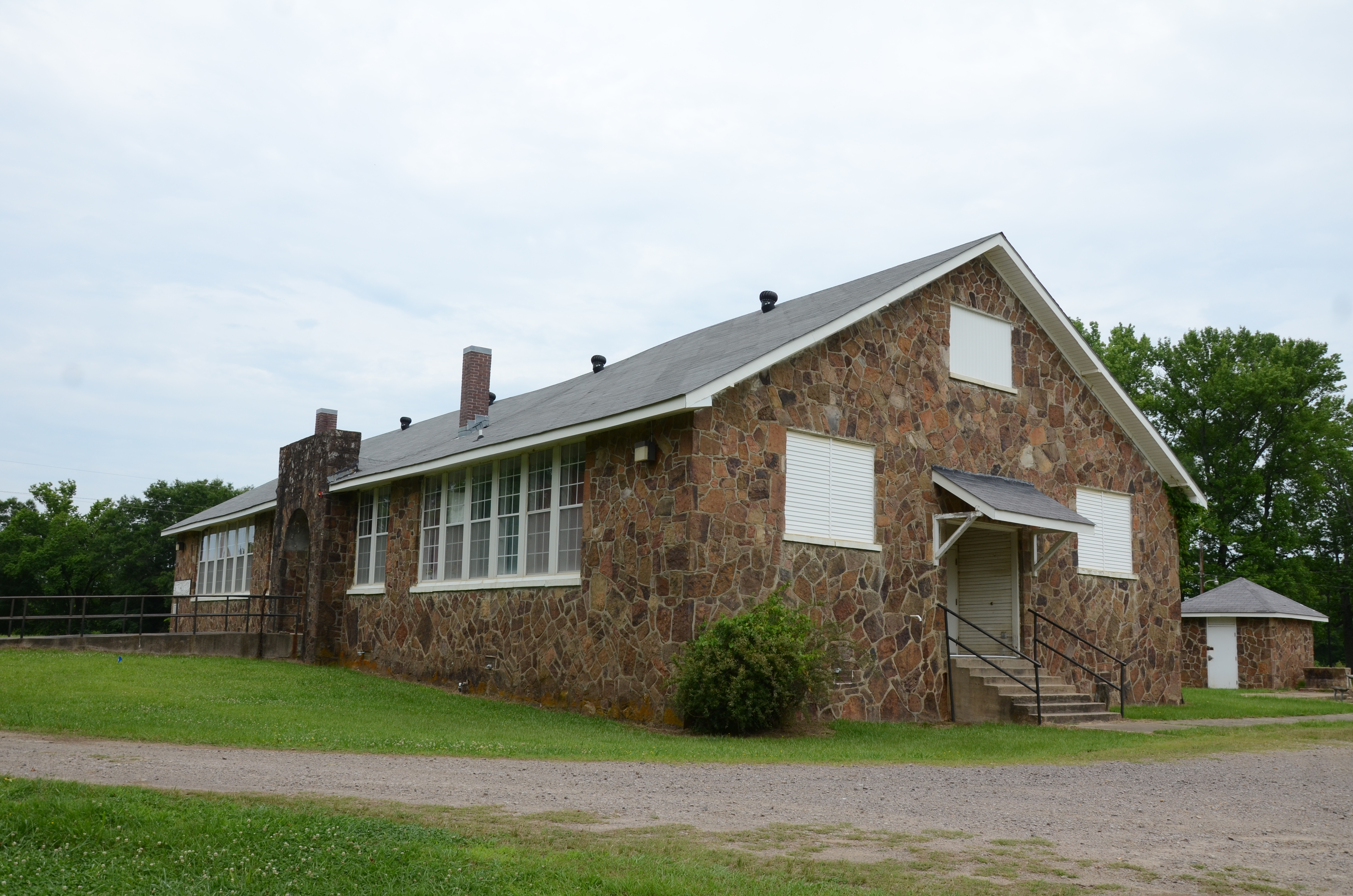
Union Chapel School and Shop Building side view

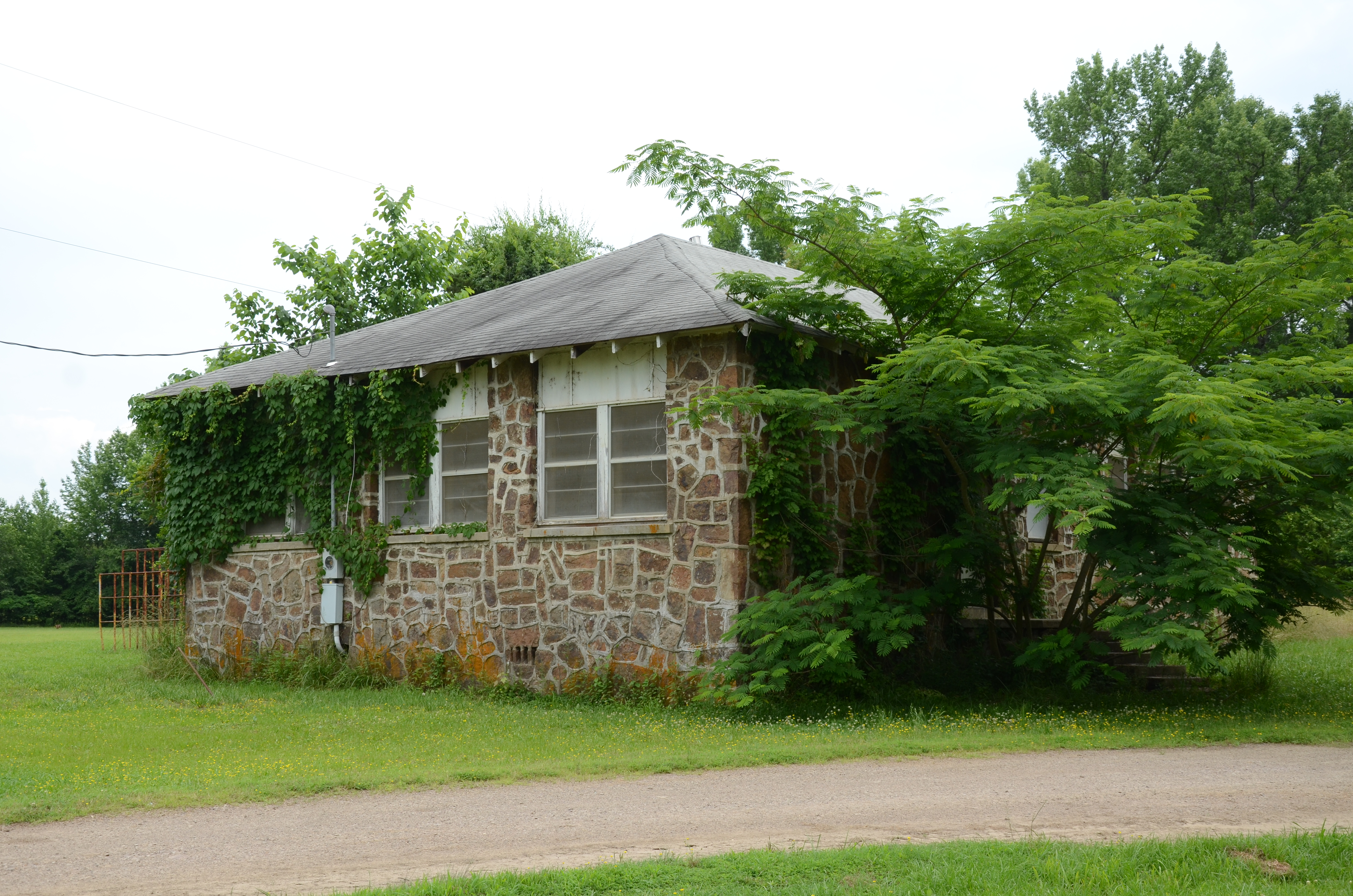
Building side view

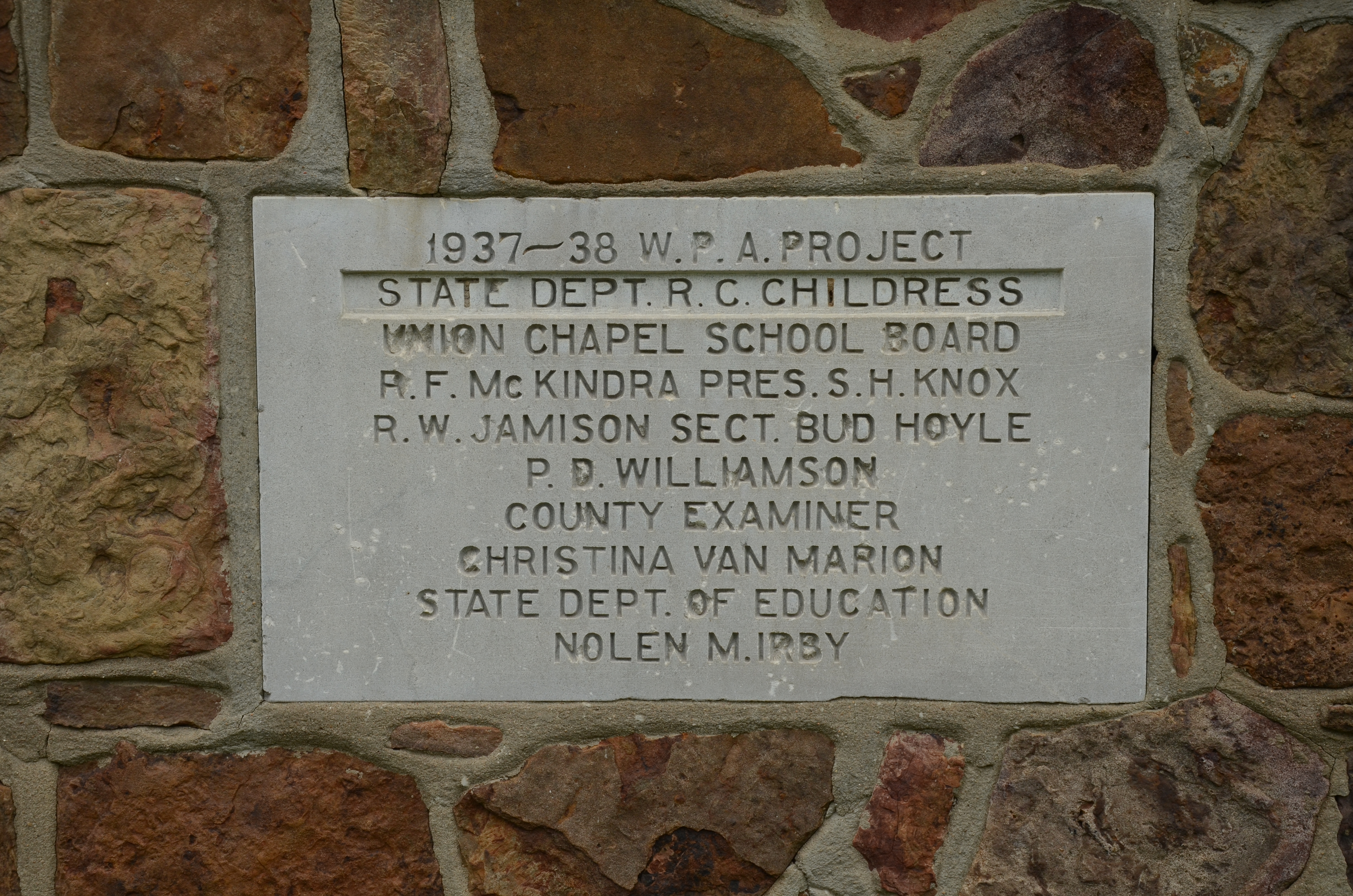
Building plaque

== See also ==
- National Register of Historic Places listings in Conway County, Arkansas
