= Pictograph Cave (Mountain View, Arkansas) =

Archaeological site in Arkansas, United States

- U.S. National Register of Historic Places
- Nearest city: Mountain View, Arkansas
- Area: 0.1 acres (0.040 ha)
- MPS: Rock Art Sites in Arkansas TR
- NRHP reference No.: 82002144
- Added to NRHP: May 4, 1982

The Pictograph Cave is a prehistoric rock art site near Mountain View, Arkansas. It consists of a panel of painted art, most of which is abstract wavy lines similar to art found at Petit Jean State Park. It is one of the furthest-removed expressions of this category of artwork from the Petit Jean area, and was listed on the National Register of Historic Places in 1982 for its information and research potential.

== See also ==
- National Register of Historic Places listings in Stone County, Arkansas
