= Cleveland City Schools (disambiguation) =

Cleveland City Schools may refer to:

- Cleveland City Schools, in Cleveland, Tennessee
- East Cleveland City Schools, in East Cleveland, Ohio
- Cleveland Metropolitan School District, in Cleveland, Ohio
- Cleveland School District, in Cleveland, Mississippi

== See also ==
- Cleveland School (disambiguation)
