= Cleveland University (disambiguation) =

Cleveland University may refer to:

- Cleveland University, a defunct university in Cleveland, Ohio (1851-1853)
- Cleveland State University, in Cleveland, Ohio
- Cleveland University-Kansas City, in Overland Park, Kansas
- Cleveland Institute of Music, in Cleveland, Ohio
- Cleveland Institute of Art, in Cleveland, Ohio
- Universities in Cleveland, Ohio

== See also ==
- Case Western Reserve University, in Cleveland, Ohio
- Cleveland College (disambiguation)
- Cleveland School (disambiguation)
