= Cox House (Morrilton, Arkansas) =

Historic house in Arkansas, United States

- U.S. National Register of Historic Places
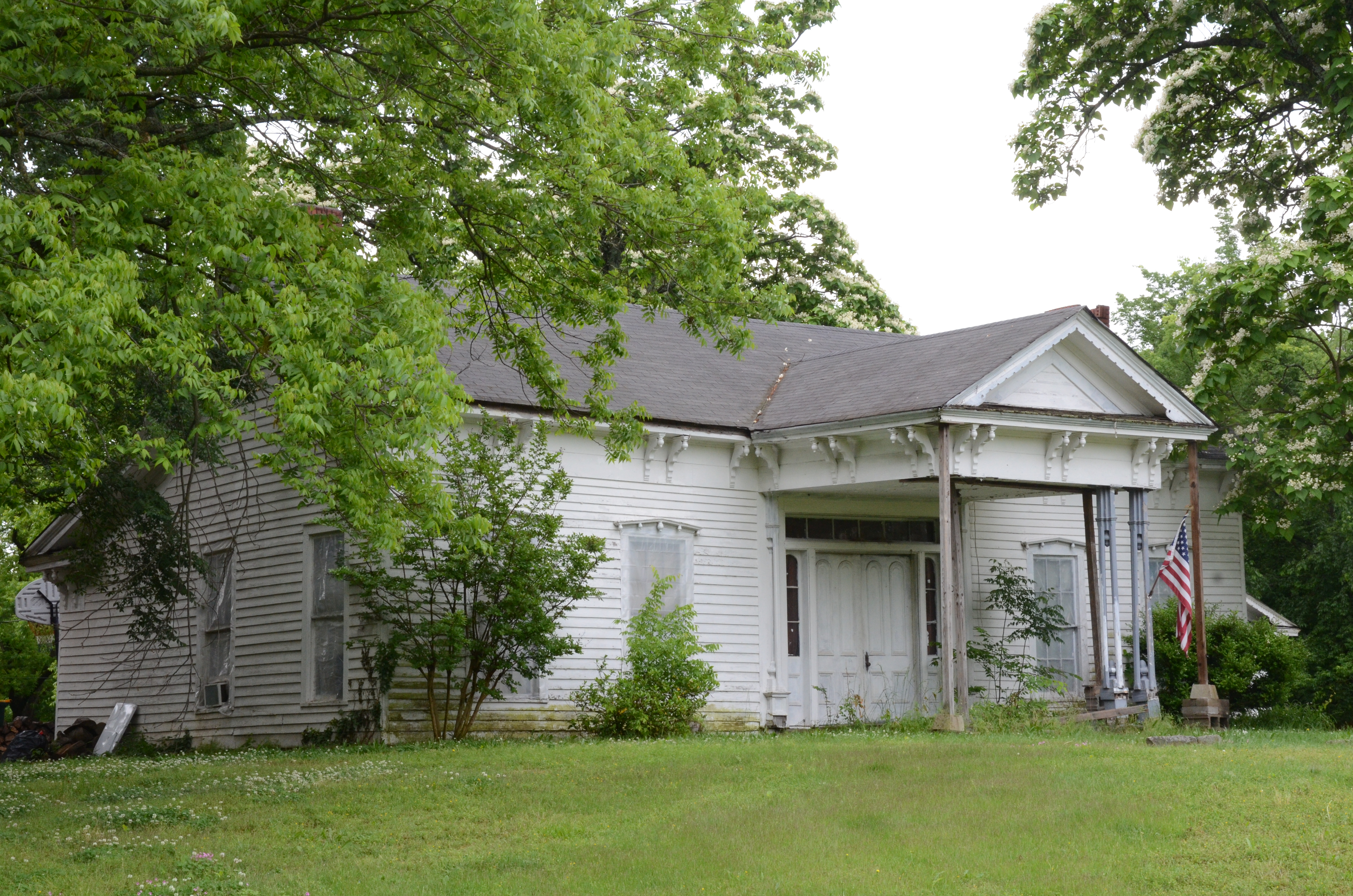

- Location within Arkansas Location within the United States
- Location: Bridge St., Morrilton, Arkansas
- Coordinates: 35°8′30″N 92°44′6″W
- Area: less than one acre
- Built: 1871
- NRHP reference No.: 74000471
- Added to NRHP: October 22, 1974

The Cox House is a historic house on Bridge Street in Morrilton, Arkansas. It is a small but architecturally eclectic single-story wood-frame house, with a gable roof and weatherboard siding. It has a projecting gabled porch, with bargeboard on the gable rake edges, brackets on the eaves, low-pitch gabled cornices over the front windows, and a broad two-leaf entrance with sidelight windows. It was built in 1875 by Hance Wesley Burrow, a farmer and veteran of the American Civil War.

The house was listed on the National Register of Historic Places in 1974.

Following years of neglect, the building was removed May 1, 2016 by the land owner.

== See also ==
- National Register of Historic Places listings in Conway County, Arkansas
