= Cleveland Middle School =

Cleveland Middle School may refer to:

- Elizabeth Cleveland Intermediate School a.k.a. Elizabeth Cleveland Middle School, Detroit, Michigan
- Cleveland Middle School, Cleveland Independent School District, Cleveland, Texas

== See also ==
- Cleveland School (disambiguation)
