= Bold Pilgrim Cemetery =

Historic African American cemetery in Arkansas, United States

- U.S. National Register of Historic Places
- Location within Arkansas Location within the United States
- Nearest city: Morrilton, Arkansas
- Coordinates: 35°14′20″N 92°41′23″W
- Area: 1.3 acres (0.53 ha)
- NRHP reference No.: 100002947
- Added to NRHP: September 18, 2018

The Bold Pilgrim Cemetery is a historic African American cemetery in rural Conway County, Arkansas. It is a 1.3-acre (0.53 ha) parcel, located at the western end of Bold Pilgrim Road, about 1.5 miles (2.4 km) southwest of Solgohachia. The cemetery is estimated to have 600 burials, the largest number of which probably occurred in the first half of the 20th century.

== History ==
The cemetery was founded about 1890 by an African American community that was located on a ridge west of the cemetery. This community, founded by formerly enslaved people, declined in the 1960s, mainly for economic reasons. The cemetery was community-based, serving the members of various churches in the area.

== Restoration ==
In 2006, the Bold Pilgrim Cemetery Preservation Association was founded to document and preserve the cemetery's history and grounds.

The cemetery was listed on the National Register of Historic Places in 2018.

== See also ==
- National Register of Historic Places listings in Conway County, Arkansas
