= Cleveland College (disambiguation) =

Cleveland College may refer to:

- Cleveland College of Art and Design, in Cleveland, England
- Redcar & Cleveland College, in Redcar, England
- Cleveland Medical College, in Cleveland, Ohio
- Cleveland–Marshall College of Law, in Cleveland, Ohio
- Cleveland Chiropractic College, in Overland Park, Kansas
- Cleveland Community College, in Cleveland County, North Carolina
- Cleveland State Community College, in Cleveland, Tennessee
- colleges in Cleveland
  - colleges in Cleveland, Ohio

== See also ==
- Cuyahoga Community College, in Cleveland, Ohio
- Cleveland State University, in Cleveland, Ohio
- Cleveland University (disambiguation)
- Cleveland School (disambiguation)
