= Cleveland shooting =

Cleveland shooting may refer to either the 2023 Cleveland, Texas shooting, or any of these shootings which all occurred in the city of Cleveland, Ohio:

- 1933 Cleveland shootings, a spree shooting in 1933
- 2003 Case Western Reserve University shooting, a school shooting in 2003
- 2007 SuccessTech Academy shooting, a school shooting in 2007
- Killing of Tamir Rice, the fatal shooting of an African American boy by police in 2014
- Killing of Robert Godwin, a murder committed at random that was recorded by the perpetrator and published to the internet in 2017
