= Little Rock to Cantonment Gibson Road-Old Wire Road Segment =

- Little Rock to Cantonment Gibson Road--Old Wire Road Segment
- U.S. National Register of Historic Places
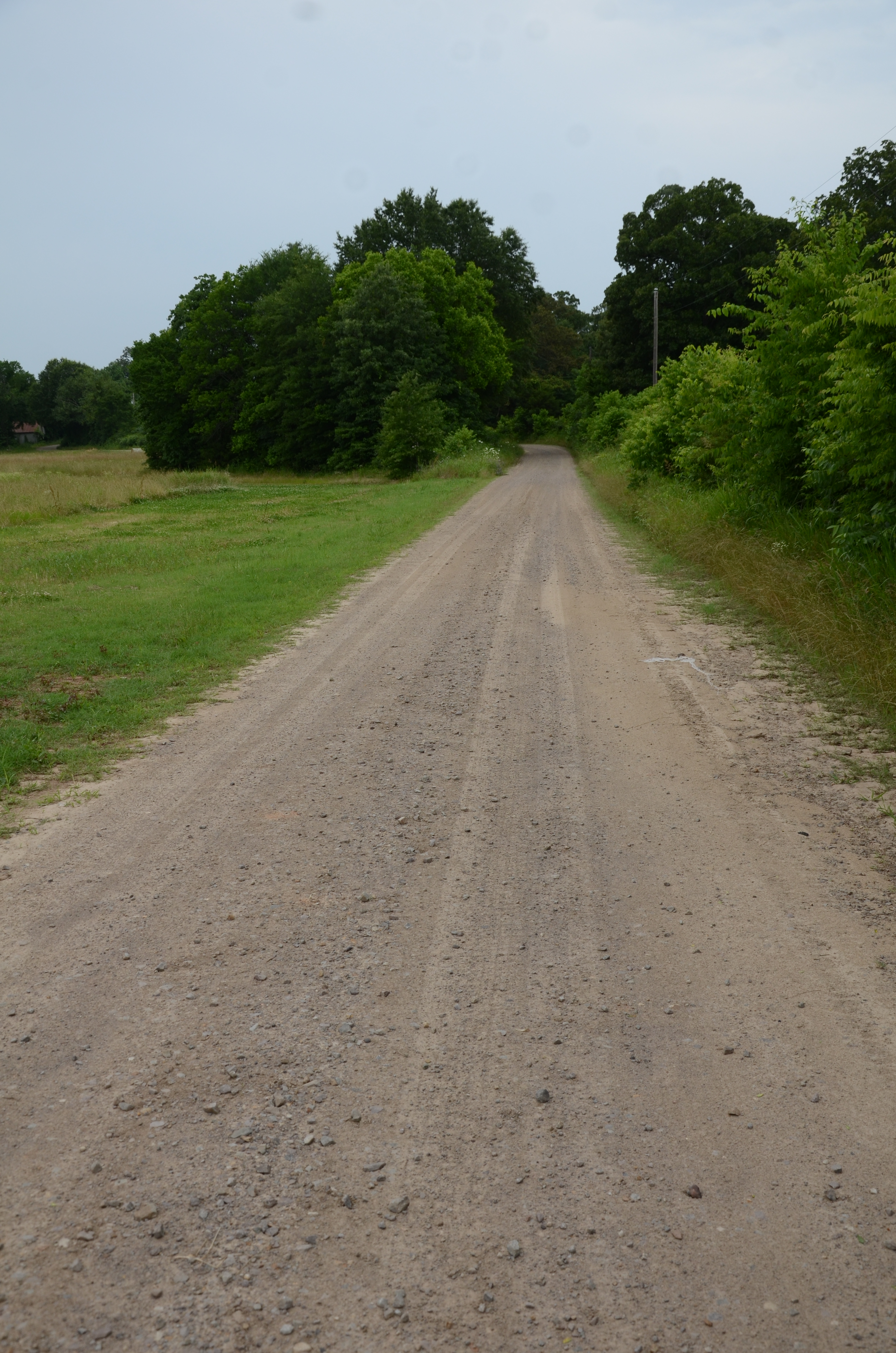

- Location within Arkansas Location within the United States
- Nearest city: Blackwell, Arkansas
- Coordinates: 35°12′47″N 92°50′45″W
- Area: less than one acre
- MPS: Cherokee Trail of Tears MPS
- NRHP reference No.: 07001465
- Added to NRHP: March 27, 2008

The Little Rock to Cantonment Gibson Road-Old Wire Road Segment is a historic road section in Conway County, Arkansas. It consists of a section of Old Wire Road, southwest of the hamlet of Blackwell, which is about 300 metres (980 ft) long and 18 feet (5.5 m) wide. It is defined in part by the cut through which it passes, with steep banks on either side. Built in 1827, it is one of the oldest surviving road alignments of the military road built between Little Rock, and what is now Fort Gibson in Oklahoma. This route formed part of the Trail of Tears, the historic removal of Native Americans to the Indian Territory that is now Oklahoma.

The road section was listed on the National Register of Historic Places in 2008.

== See also ==
- National Register of Historic Places listings in Conway County, Arkansas
