= Cedar Creek Bridge (Petit Jean State Park, Arkansas) =

- Davies Bridge (on Cedar Creek)
- U.S. National Register of Historic Places
- U.S. Historic district – Contributing property
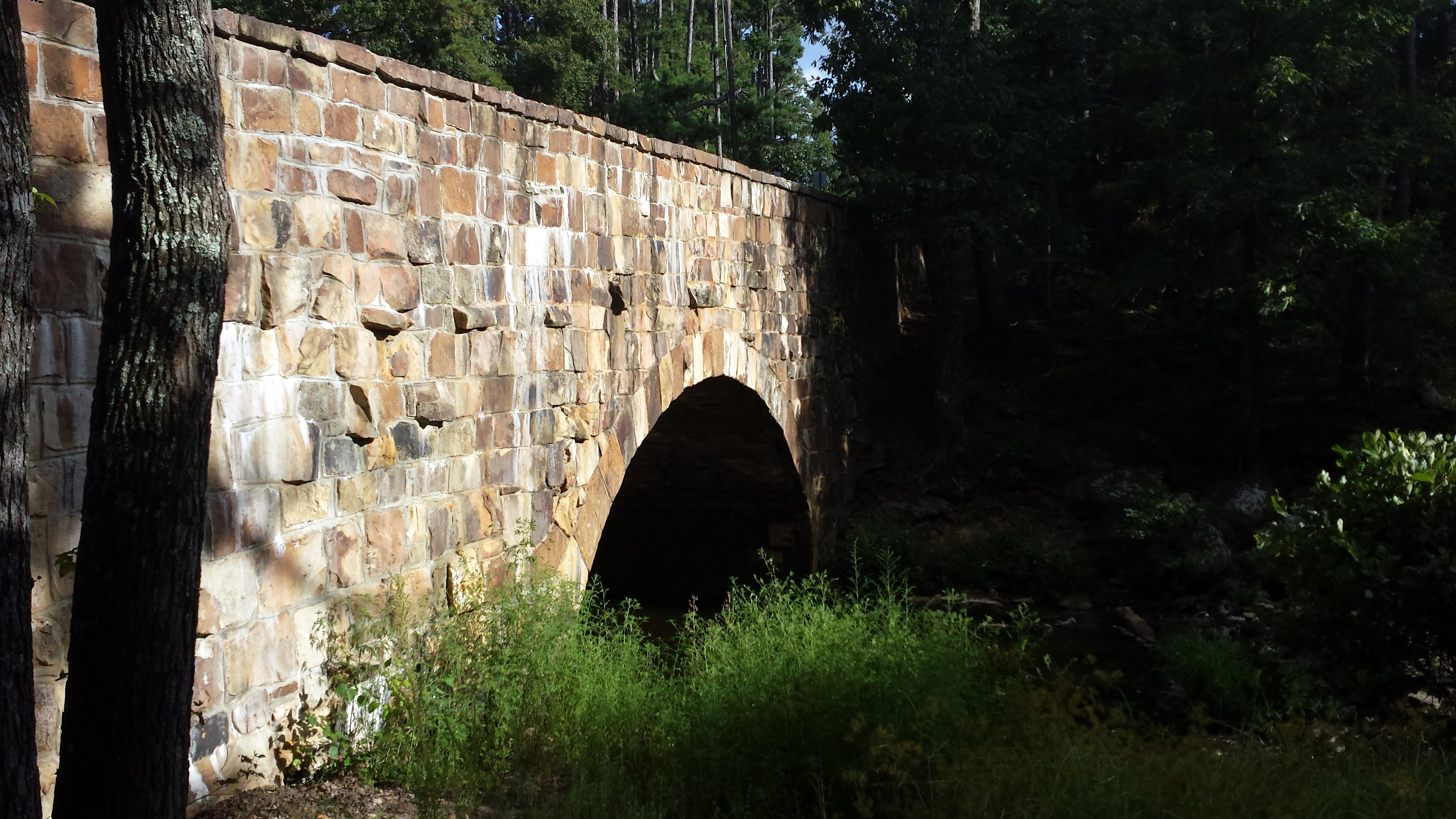
- Bridge profile

- Location within Arkansas Location within the United States
- Location: Off Highway 154, over Cedar Creek at Roosevelt Lake within Petit Jean State Park
- Coordinates: 35°7′43″N 92°55′30″W
- Built: 1934
- Architect: Ladd Davies, CCC
- Architectural style: Closed spandrel, deck arch
- Part of: Petit Jean State Park-Lake Bailey-Roosevelt Lake Historic District (ID92000515)
- MPS: Historic Bridges of Arkansas MPS
- NRHP reference No.: 90000520

Significant dates
- Added to NRHP: April 9, 1990
- Designated CP: May 28, 1992

The Davies Bridge carries Red Bluff Drive across Cedar Creek, just north of Arkansas Highway 154 in Petit Jean State Park, Arkansas. It is a single-span closed-spandrel masonry arch structure, with an arch 20 feet (6.1 m) long and 10 feet (3.0 m) high. It is built out of mortared ashlar fieldstone laid in courses, with some stones left rusticated and protruding from the sides. The bridge was built in 1934 by a crew of the Civilian Conservation Corps that was developing the park's facilities.

The bridge was listed on the National Register of Historic Places in 1990.

== See also ==
- List of bridges documented by the Historic American Engineering Record in Arkansas
- List of bridges on the National Register of Historic Places in Arkansas
- National Register of Historic Places listings in Conway County, Arkansas
