= Cleveland school shooting =

Cleveland school shooting may refer to:

- Cleveland Elementary School shooting (San Diego), an incident in 1979, committed by Brenda Spencer
- 1989 Cleveland Elementary School shooting (Stockton), an incident in 1989, committed by Patrick Purdy
- 2003 Case Western Reserve University shooting, an incident in Cleveland, Ohio, in 2003, committed by Biswanath Halder
- 2007 SuccessTech Academy shooting, an incident in Cleveland, Ohio, in 2007, committed by Asa H. Coon

== See also ==
- Cleveland shooting (disambiguation)
