= Cafeteria Building-Cleveland School =

- U.S. National Register of Historic Places
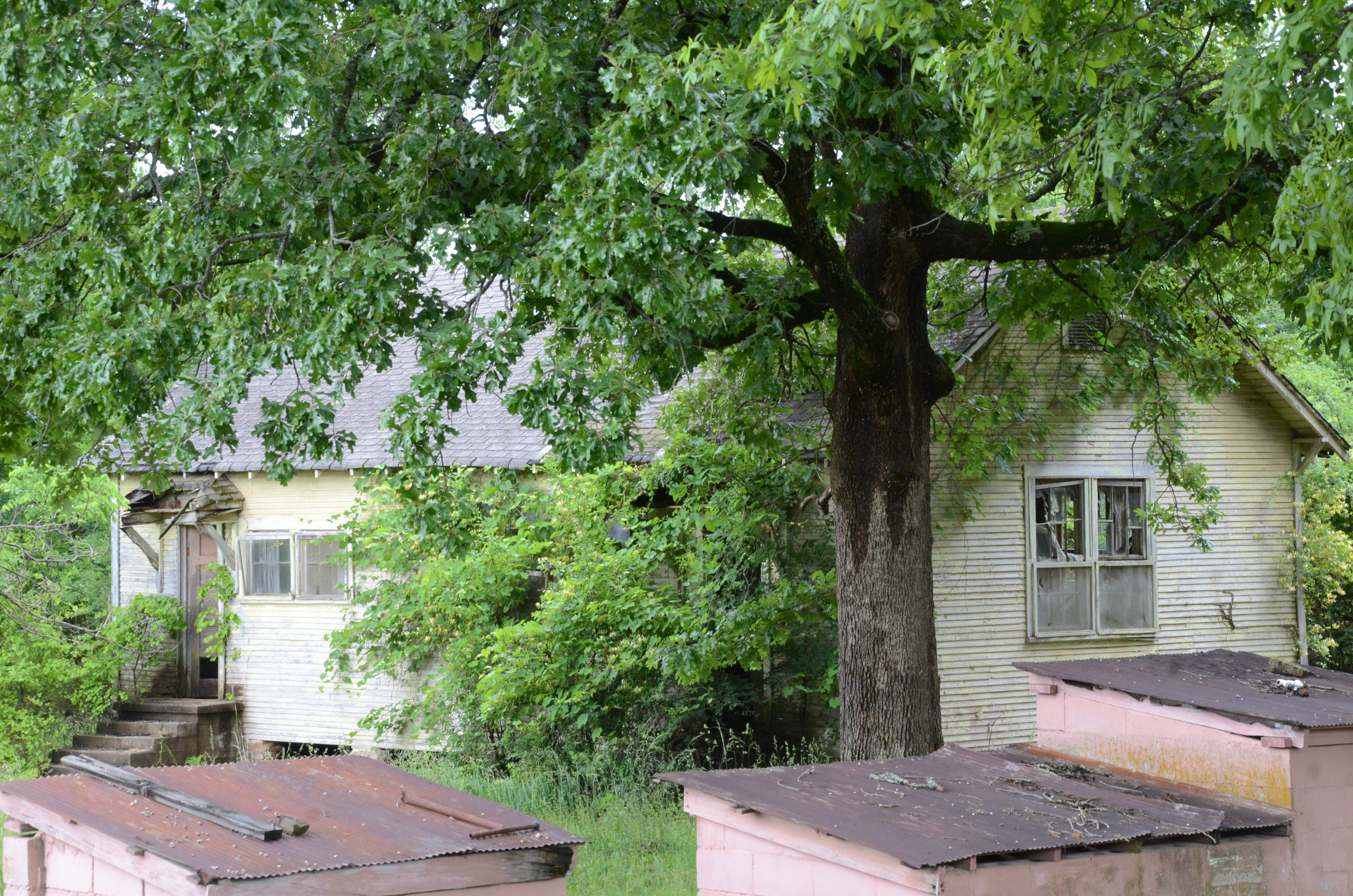

- Location within Arkansas Location within the United States
- Nearest city: Cleveland, Arkansas
- Coordinates: 35°23′28″N 92°42′42″W
- Area: less than one acre
- Architectural style: Bungalow/craftsman
- MPS: Public Schools in the Ozarks MPS
- NRHP reference No.: 92001194
- Added to NRHP: September 10, 1992

The Cafeteria Building of the Cleveland School is a historic school building in rural Conway County, Arkansas. It is located near the hamlet of Cleveland, on the south side of Center School Road (County Road 511). It is a single-story wood-frame structure, with a gable-on-hip roof, weatherboard siding, and a foundation of stone piers. It has vernacular Craftsman styling, with exposed rafter ends in the eaves, large Craftsman brackets in the gables, and bracketed hoods sheltering the entrances. It was built about 1930, and initially served as a cafeteria for an adjacent elementary school; it was later converted to classroom use.

The building was listed on the National Register of Historic Places in 1992.

== See also ==
- National Register of Historic Places listings in Conway County, Arkansas
