= Cleveland Court School =

- U.S. National Register of Historic Places
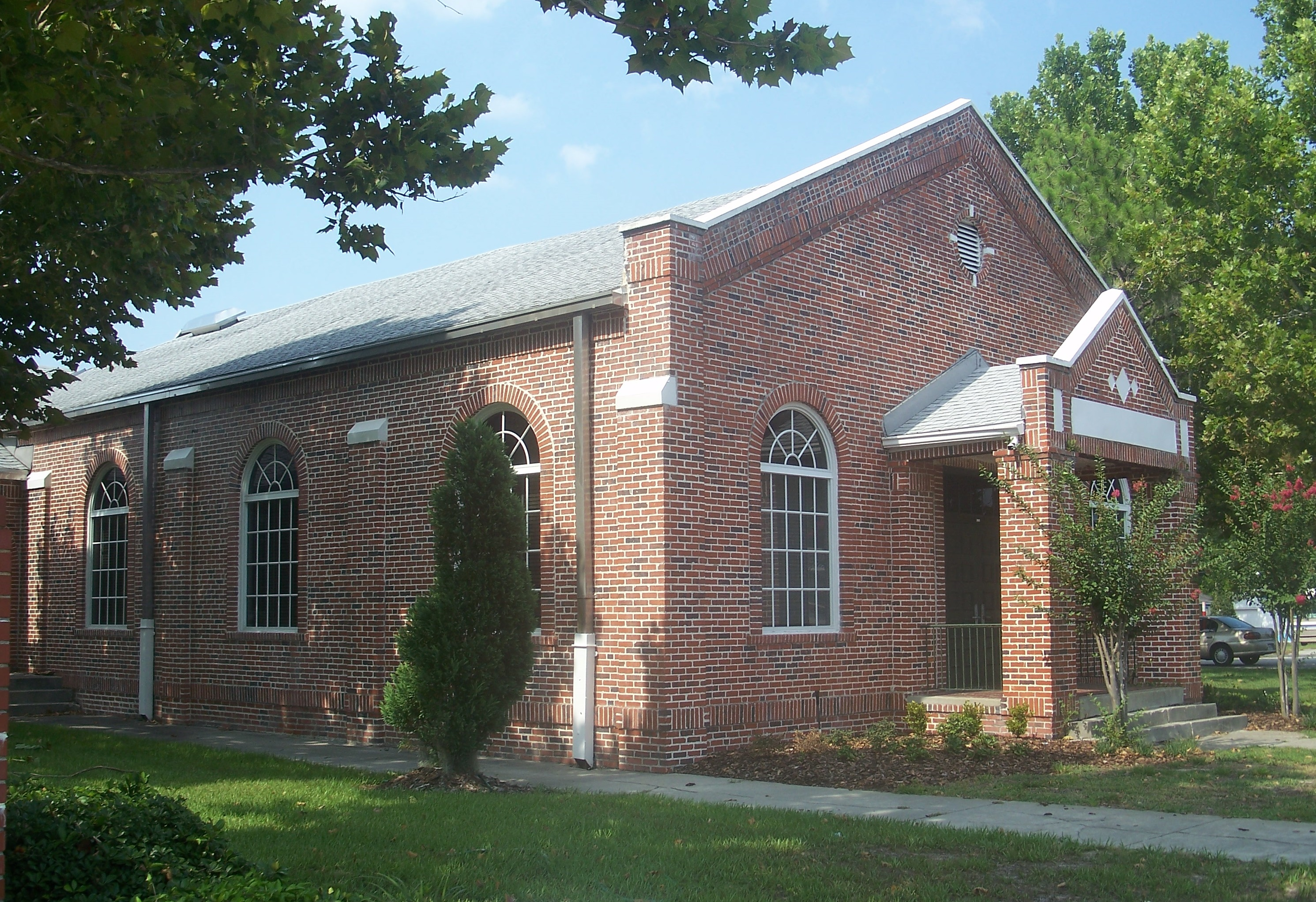

- Location within Florida Location within the United States
- Location: Lakeland, Florida
- Coordinates: 28°0′42″N 81°57′14″W
- Architectural style: Colonial Revival
- NRHP reference No.: 99000862
- Added to NRHP: July 22, 1999

The Cleveland Court School (also known as the Cleveland Court Elementary) is a historic school in Lakeland, Florida. It is located at 328 East Edgewood Drive. On July 22, 1999, it was added to the U.S. National Register of Historic Places.
