= 1933 Cleveland shootings =

Mass shooting in Ohio, U.S.

- Route taken by Herman Klink during the shooting
- Location: Cleveland, Ohio, U.S.
- Date: March 6, 1933
- Target: Civilians
- Attack type: Mass murder, spree shooting, mass shooting, shootout
- Weapon: .22-caliber rifle (loaded with expanding bullets)
- Deaths: 6 (including the perpetrator)
- Injuries: 6
- Perpetrator: Herman Klink

On March 6, 1933, a mass shooting took place in Cleveland, Ohio, United States. Five people were killed and six were wounded before the perpetrator, 40-year-old Herman Klink was shot and killed by police after a brief standoff.

== Shootings ==
On March 6, 1933, Klink went home after reading about a bank holiday in the newspaper and armed himself with a rifle. Despite most of the attack occurring near the Lorain Street Savings and Trust Co. bank, Klink had never deposited any money there, nor had he made any transactions with the bank. However, he had been seen arguing about financial matters at the bank earlier that day.

After arming himself with a .22-caliber rifle, Klink walked out of his Whitman Avenue home and shot a man in the shoulder. The man managed to survive after running for cover behind a tree. Klink then shot 52-year-old Louis Kallay, who had walked out of his house to investigate the gunshot he heard. He also fatally shot 43-year-old Roy Kneale. Klink proceeded on foot to West 38th street, where he mortally wounded Herman Pahler, a patrolman directing traffic in front of St. Mary's Catholic School, after shooting him in the abdomen, groin, and legs. As Albert Marquis, 67, and Joseph Sapko, 22, ran for cover in opposite directions, Klink shot them both in their abdomens. Pahler, Marquis, and Sapko died from their injuries in the hospital days after the shooting. Klink continued to shoot at people who tried to help the other victims.

Police officers and armed neighbors chased Klink for several blocks. After opening fire on a squad of detectives pursuing him, Klink was shot to death by detective Jay Cook on Lorain Avenue.

== Victims ==
Five victims died as a result of the shooting:

- Louis Kallay (aged 52)
- Roy Kneale (aged 43)
- Albert Marquis (aged 67)
- Herman Pahler (aged 45)
- Joseph Sapko (aged 22)

Six others were injured during the shooting, the youngest being 11 years old and the oldest being 45 years old.

== Perpetrator ==
Herman Klink (1893 – March 6, 1933) diagnosed with persecutory delusions and dementia praecox. Because of his mental illnesses, he believed that the government was spying on him. Eight months prior to the shooting, Klink was fired from his job as a woodworker because his employer believed he posed a danger to his colleagues. His neighbors described his behavior as strange. His coworkers also thought he was a potential danger, but took no action in reporting him. Klink remained unemployed in the months leading up to the attack.
