= Petit Jean State Park =

State park in Arkansas, United States

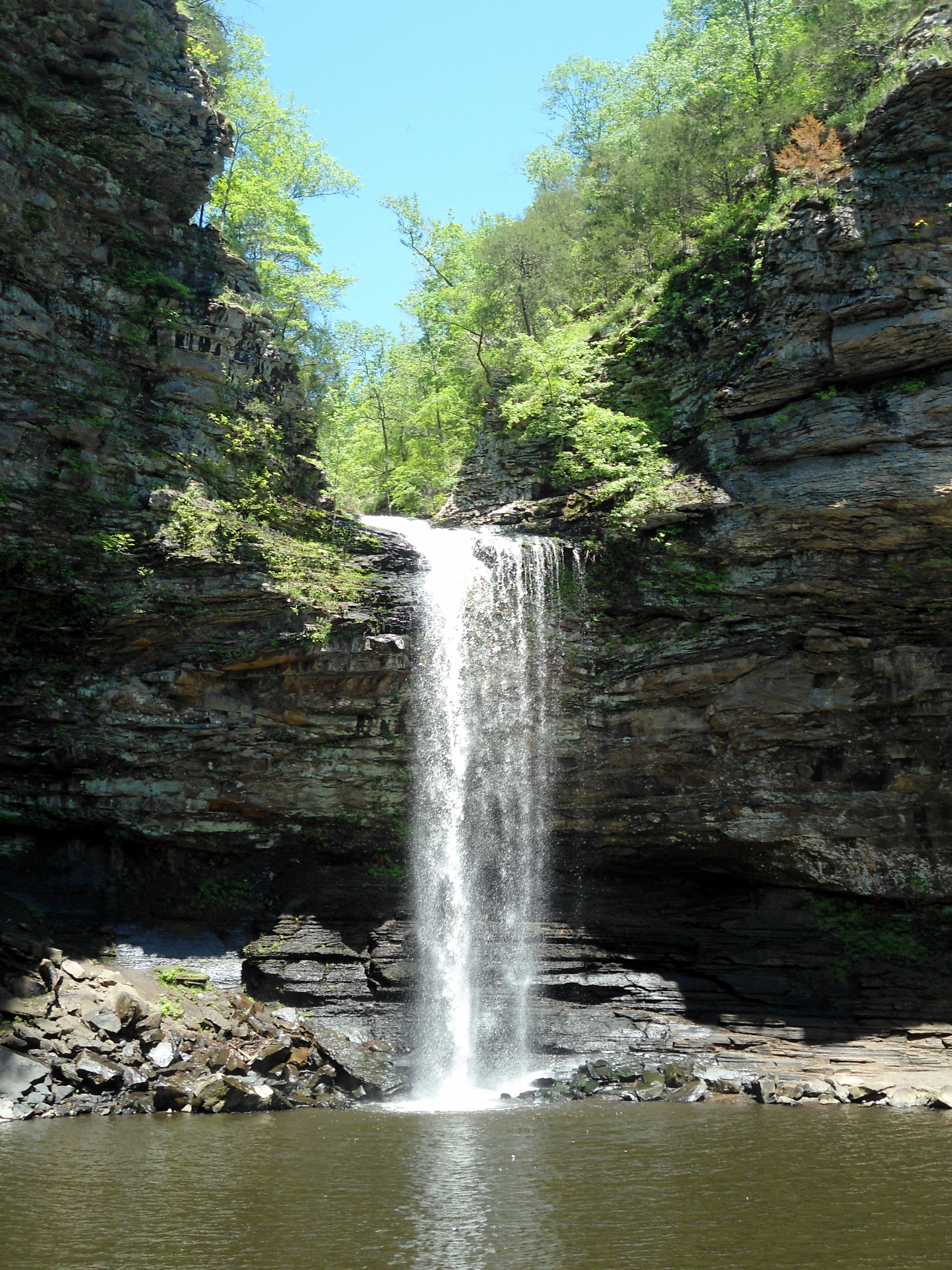
- Cedar Falls

- Location within Arkansas Location within the United States
- Interactive map of Petit Jean State Park
- Location: Conway County, Arkansas, United States
- Coordinates: 35°07′03″N 92°56′18″W
- Area: 3,471 acres (1,405 ha)
- Established: 1923
- Administrator: Arkansas Department of Parks, Heritage and Tourism, Arkansas Natural Heritage Commission
- Website: Official website
- Arkansas State Parks

Petit Jean State Park is a 3,471-acre (1,405 ha) park in Conway County, Arkansas managed by the Arkansas Department of Parks and Tourism. It is located on top of Petit Jean Mountain next to the Arkansas River in the area between the Ouachita Mountains and the Ozark Plateaus.

== Legend and naming ==
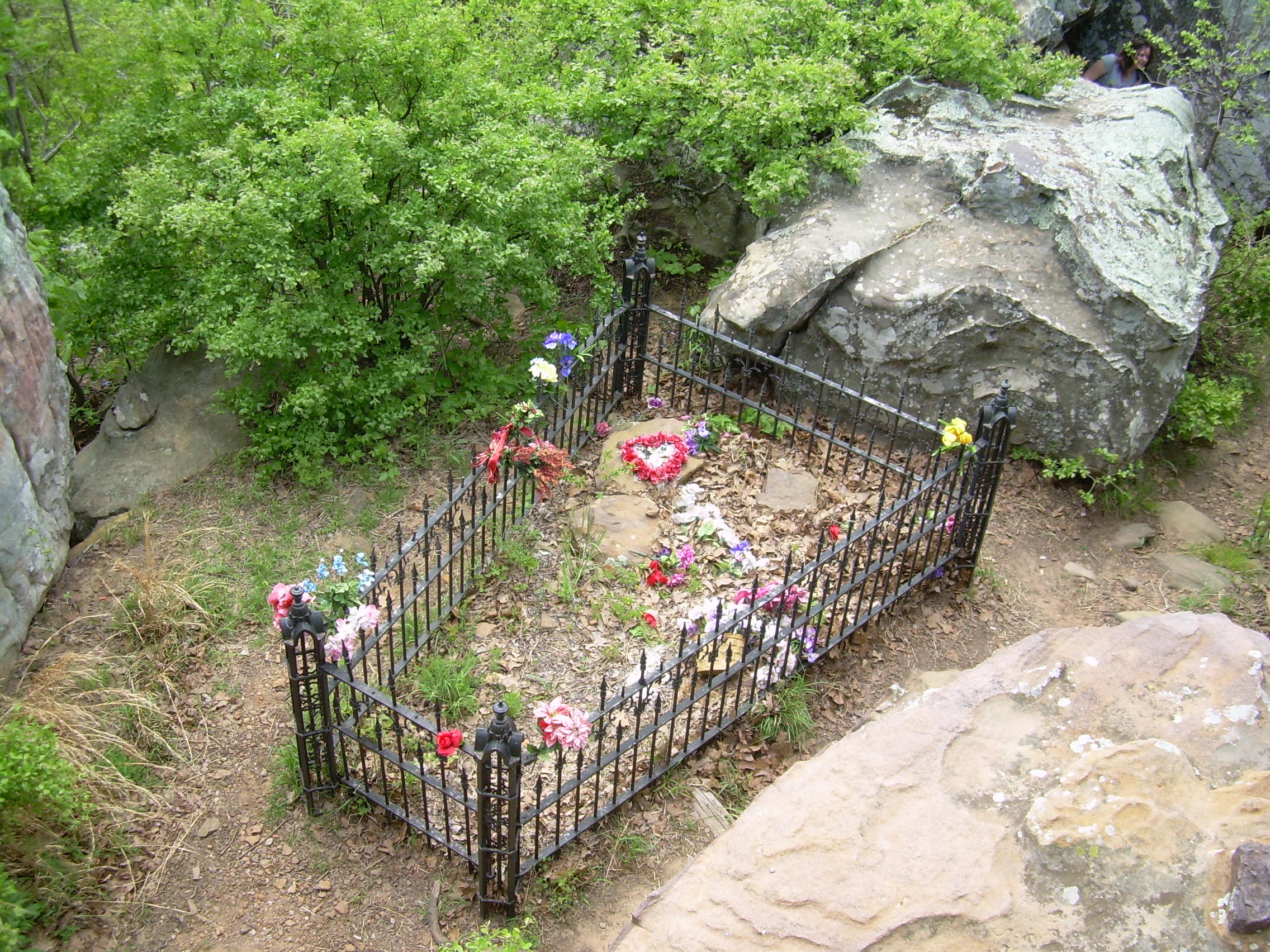
The grave of "Petit Jean" atop Petit Jean mountain.

According to legend Petit Jean was actually a young 18th century French woman. When she discovered that her fiancé planned to explore the Louisiana Territory, she cut her hair, disguised herself as a boy and managed to find a position as a cabin boy. She survived the voyage and the expedition began their exploration. Once they had reached the area of the mountain, the young woman became ill; on her deathbed she revealed herself to her fiancé, and was buried on the mountain, not under her own name, but under the name she had been known by on the ship, "Little John".

Locals pronounce the name "PET-ih jeen" or "petty jeen".

== The park ==
Buildings of log and stone construction built by the Civilian Conservation Corps during the 1930s are scattered throughout the park giving it a rustic feel. A 24-room historic lodge called Mather Lodge sits on the edge of a bluff of a deep forested canyon. In addition to the lodge there are 32 cabins and 127 campsites available for park visitors.

The canyon and bluffs were created by Cedar Creek, which cascades into the canyon in an impressive 95-foot (29 m) waterfall. Above the falls, Cedar Creek has been dammed to create the 100-acre (40 ha) Lake Bailey which is used for pedal-boating and fishing.

Petit Jean has a visitor center and gift shop in the center of the park and a boathouse at Lake Bailey that provides boat rentals, fishing supplies, and a snack bar. Tennis and basketball courts, a swimming pool, and picnic areas are available for the use of park guests.

The Museum of Automobiles is less than a mile from the main camping areas.

The park also has several geological and archaeological features such as Bear Cave, Rock House Cave, the Grotto, Turtle Rocks, Carpet Rocks, and Natural Bridge. The scenic overlook at Petit Jean's grave provides a view of the Arkansas River Valley.

In 2017, Petit Jean was rated as the best campsite in Arkansas in a 50-state survey conducted by Msn.com.

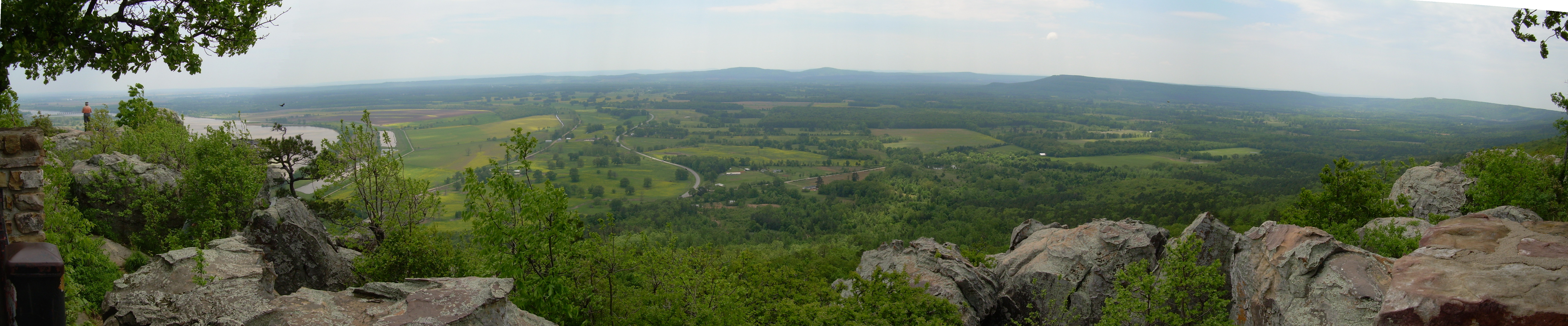
Panoramic view from Petit Jean Mountain overlook. Petit Jean's grave is just below, out of sight of the photo. The Arkansas River can be seen on the left.

== Buildings and infrastructure ==
- Petit Jean State Park-Administration Office
- U.S. National Register of Historic Places
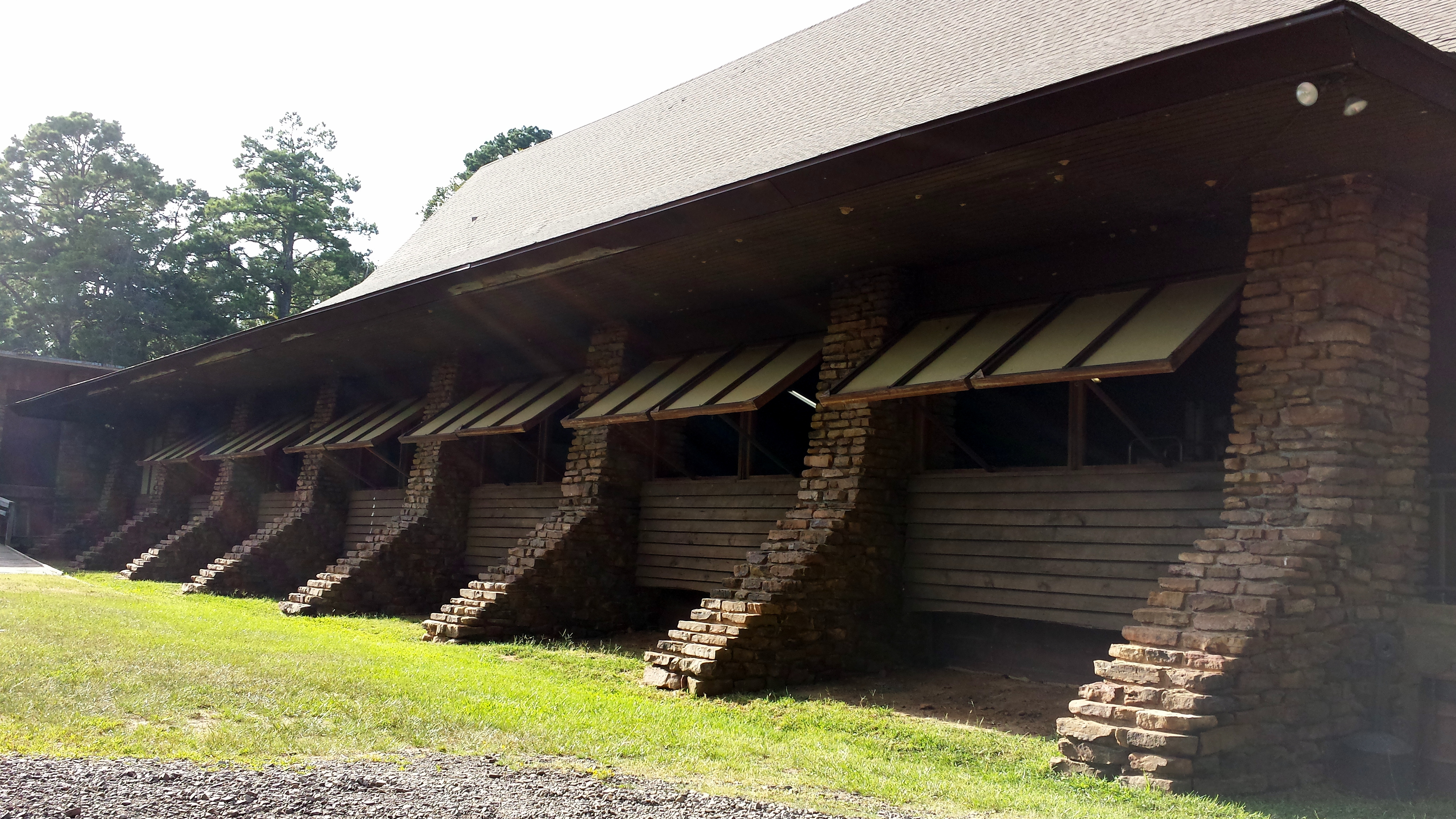
- CCC assembly hall at Petit Jean State Park
- Nearest city: Winrock, Arkansas
- Coordinates: 35°7′39″N 92°55′9″W
- Area: less than one acre
- Built: 1935
- Built by: Civilian Conservation Corps
- Architectural style: Rustic Resort
- MPS: Facilities Constructed by the CCC in Arkansas MPS
- NRHP reference No.: 92000520
- Added to NRHP: May 28, 1992

A significant portion of the park's infrastructure was developed in the 1930s by work crews of the Civilian Conservation Corps (CCC), and many of those elements remain in good condition, forming an important element of the park's appearance. The CCC crews built roads, buildings, trails, and the dams which impound Lake Bailey and Roosevelt Lake. These features are described in further detail below. Many of them have been listed on the National Register of Historic Places.

=== Buildings ===
The CCC built a number of significant buildings in the park, including administrative and public-use facilities. The most prominent of these is probably Mather Lodge, a large Rustic stone building built in 1935, enlarged in 1940 (also by the CCC), and again about 1960, when its restaurant wing was added. The main administration building, now partly converted to a gift shop, was also built about 1935. One of the more unusual buildings the CCC erected in the park is its original water treatment building (now abandoned), a roughly square stone structure, which, despite its remote location away from the tourist facilities, is still in the Rustic style of its public buildings. It was in the park's early years a critical element of its infrastructure, housing equipment that filtered and sanitized water for park visitors.

The park's facilities also include a series of cabins available for rent by visitors. Four of these were built by the CCC, and exhibit its classic Rustic style. All four (cabin numbers 1, 6, 9, and 16) were built about 1935, and are roughly T-shaped stone structures, with gabled or hipped roofs and projecting central porches. Cabin #1 has a stone patio to one side. Cabin #6 has a shed-roof porch with views of the canyon. Cabin #9 is partially finished with weatherboard siding, and has an original stone masonry cooking pit nearby. Cabin #16 is rectangular, with its porch supported by log columns.

=== Roads, bridges, and trails ===
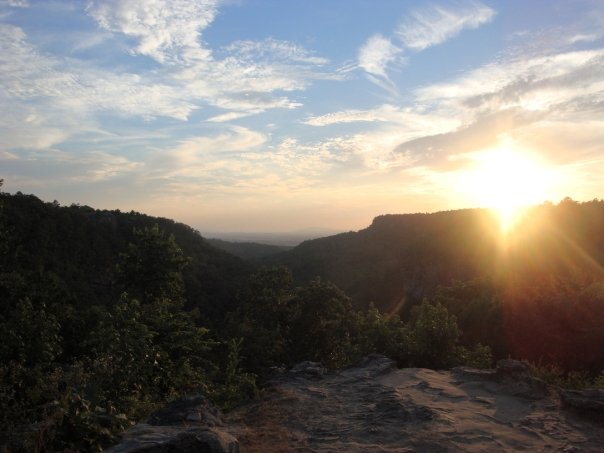
View from Mather Lodge breezeway

The CCC built several roads and trails through the park. The Blue Hole Road, which now forms part of the Boy Scout Trail, originally provided vehicular access from the Red Bluff loop road down to the Blue Hole swimming area. Surviving features include culverts, a retaining wall, and some guard rail. A well-preserved section of trail built by the CCC is the Cedar Falls Trail, which provides access from Mather Lodge into the canyon, and includes a bridge across Cedar Creek.

Two CCC-built road-related structures are still in active use for vehicular traffic. A box culvert built out of stone underlies Highway 154, the main access road through the park, and the Cedar Creek Bridge carries Red Bluff Drive over Cedar Creek, just below the outlet of Lake Roosevelt. There is also a now-disused pedestrian bridge, built of concrete to resemble logs (in a cruder version of works done by Dionicio Rodriguez elsewhere in Arkansas) in one of the park's grassy areas.

== See also ==
- Archaeological sites in Petit Jean State Park
- National Register of Historic Places listings in Conway County, Arkansas
