= List of schools in Redcar and Cleveland =

This is a list of schools in Redcar and Cleveland, in the English county of North Yorkshire.

== State-funded schools ==
=== Primary schools ===
- Badger Hill Academy, Brotton
- Bankfields Primary School, Eston
- Belmont Primary School, Guisborough
- Caedmon Primary School, Grangetown
- Chaloner Primary School, Guisborough
- Coatham CE Primary School, Redcar
- Dormanstown Primary Academy, Dormanstown
- Errington Primary School, Marske-by-the-Sea
- Galley Hill Primary School, Guisborough
- Grangetown Primary School, Grangetown
- Green Gates Primary School, Redcar
- Handale Primary School, Loftus
- Highcliffe Primary School, Guisborough
- Hummersea Primary School, Loftus
- Ings Farm Primary School, Redcar
- John Emmerson Batty Primary School, Redcar
- Lakes Primary School, Redcar
- Lingdale Primary School, Lingdale
- Lockwood Primary School, Boosbeck
- New Marske Primary School, New Marske
- Newcomen Primary School, Redcar
- Normanby Primary School, Normanby
- Nunthorpe Primary Academy, Nunthorpe
- Ormesby Primary School, Ormesby
- Overfields Primary School, Ormesby
- Riverdale Primary School, Redcar
- St Bede's RC Primary School, Marske-by-the-Sea
- St Benedict's RC Primary School, Redcar
- St Gabriel's RC Primary School, Ormesby
- St Joseph's RC Primary School, Loftus
- St Margaret Clitherow's RC Primary School, South Bank
- St Mary's RC Primary School, Grangetown
- St Paulinus RC Primary School, Guisborough
- St Peter's CE Primary School, Brotton
- Saltburn Primary School, Saltburn-by-the-Sea
- Skelton Primary School, Skelton-in-Cleveland
- South Bank Community Primary School, South Bank
- Teesville Academy, Teesville
- Westgarth Primary School, Marske-by-the-Sea
- Whale Hill Primary School, Eston
- Wheatlands Primary School, Redcar
- Whitecliffe Academy, Carlin How
- Wilton Primary Academy, Lazenby
- Zetland Primary School, Redcar

=== Secondary schools ===
- Freebrough Academy, Saltburn-by-the-Sea
- Huntcliff School, Saltburn-by-the-Sea
- Laurence Jackson School, Guisborough
- Nunthorpe Academy, Nunthorpe
- Outwood Academy Bydales, Marske-by-the-Sea
- Outwood Academy Normanby, South Bank
- Outwood Academy Redcar, Redcar
- Rye Hills Academy, Redcar
- Sacred Heart Catholic Secondary, Redcar
- St Peter's Catholic College, South Bank

=== Special and alternative schools ===
- Archway Academy, Teesville
- Kilton Thorpe Specialist Academy, Brotton
- Kirkleatham Hall School, Kirkleatham
- Mo Mowlam Academy, Redcar
- River Tees Academy Grangetown, Grangetown

=== Further education ===
- Prior Pursglove College
- Redcar & Cleveland College

== Independent schools ==
=== Special and alternative schools ===
- Invested Education, Marske-by-the-Sea
- Mackenzie Thorpe Centre, South Bank
- Old Farm School, Brotton
- Outwood Alternative Provision Eston, Eston
- Progress Schools - Tees Valley, Eston
