= Plumerville, Arkansas =

City in Arkansas, US

- City
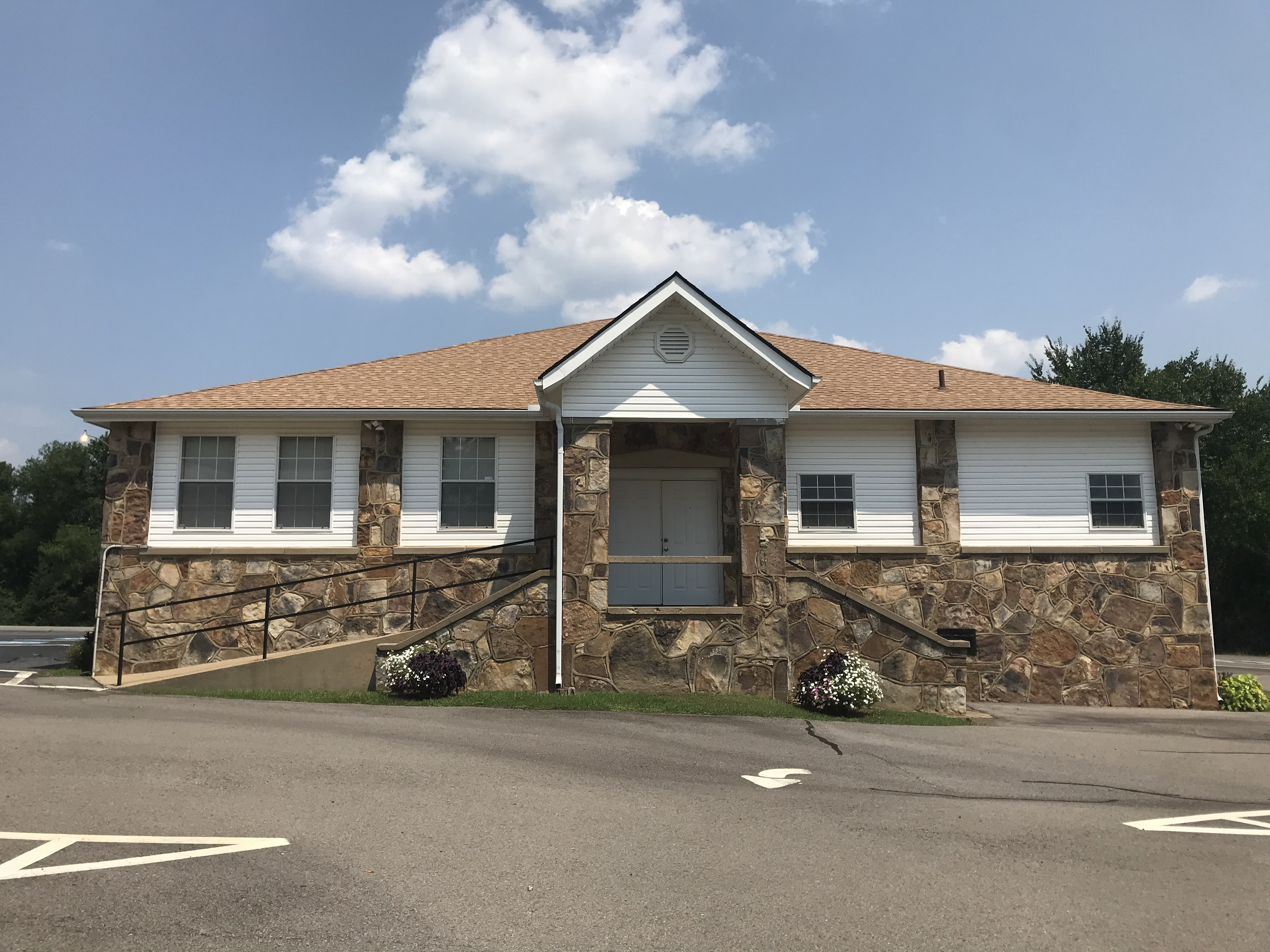
- Plumerville in 2021

- Location of Plumerville in Conway County, Arkansas.
- Coordinates: 35°9′39″N 92°38′34″W
- Country: United States
- State: Arkansas
- County: Conway

Area
  - Total: 1.04 sq mi (2.70 km^{2})
  - Land: 1.03 sq mi (2.67 km^{2})
  - Water: 0.015 sq mi (0.04 km^{2})
- Elevation: 315 ft (96 m)

Population (2020)
  - Total: 734
  - Estimate (2025): 738 ▲
  - Density: 713.2/sq mi (275.37/km^{2})
- Time zone: UTC-6 (Central (CST))
  - Summer (DST): UTC-5 (CDT)
- ZIP code: 72127
- Area code: 501
- FIPS code: 05-56480
- GNIS feature ID: 2404542
- Website: plumerville.net

Plumerville is a city in Conway County, Arkansas, United States. The population was 734 at the 2020 census.

== Geography ==
Plumerville is located in southern Conway County at 35°9′39″N 92°38′34″W (35.160896, -92.642794), along U.S. Route 64, which leads east 5 miles (8 km) to Menifee and west 6 miles (10 km) to Morrilton, the county seat. Interstate 40 passes through the northern edge of the city with access from one exit and leads southeast 45 miles (72 km) to Little Rock and west 113 miles (182 km) to Fort Smith.

According to the United States Census Bureau, Plumerville has a total area of 1.2 square miles (3.0 km^{2}), of which 0.02 square miles (0.04 km^{2}), or 1.39%, is water.

== Demographics ==
Historical population
Census	Pop.	Note	%±
1880	135		—
1890	214		58.5%
1900	296		38.3%
1910	495		67.2%
1920	702		41.8%
1930	613		−12.7%
1940	541		−11.7%
1950	550		1.7%
1960	586		6.5%
1970	724		23.5%
1980	785		8.4%
1990	832		6.0%
2000	854		2.6%
2010	826		−3.3%
2020	734		−11.1%
2025 (est.)	738	▲	0.5%
U.S. Decennial Census

As of the census of 2000, there were 854 people, 345 households, and 239 families residing in the city. The population density was 856.0 inhabitants per square mile (330.5/km^{2}). There were 379 housing units at an average density of 379.9 per square mile (146.7/km^{2}). The racial makeup of the city was 72.95% White, 23.65% Black or African American, 0.47% Native American, 0.35% Asian, 0.12% Pacific Islander, 0.35% from other races, and 2.11% from two or more races. 1.17% of the population were Hispanic or Latino of any race.

There were 345 households, out of which 33.6% had children under the age of 18 living with them, 47.2% were married couples living together, 19.1% had a female householder with no husband present, and 30.7% were non-families. 27.2% of all households were made up of individuals, and 10.7% had someone living alone who was 65 years of age or older. The average household size was 2.48 and the average family size was 2.98.

In the city, the population was spread out, with 26.5% under the age of 18, 9.6% from 18 to 24, 27.4% from 25 to 44, 23.5% from 45 to 64, and 13.0% who were 65 years of age or older. The median age was 36 years. For every 100 females, there were 85.7 males. For every 100 females age 18 and over, there were 85.3 males.

The median income for a household in the city was $28,571, and the median income for a family was $37,679. Males had a median income of $27,014 versus $21,607 for females. The per capita income for the city was $13,968. About 15.1% of families and 21.4% of the population were below the poverty line, including 21.7% of those under age 18 and 14.0% of those age 65 or over.

== History ==
Plumerville began as Plummer's Station, a stage station on the Fort Smith to Memphis branch of the Butterfield Overland Mail.

The old downtown area of Plumerville was completely destroyed by fire in 1987. The old town jail or "calaboose" (built circa 1880) still stands intact on Springfield Street near the new city hall.

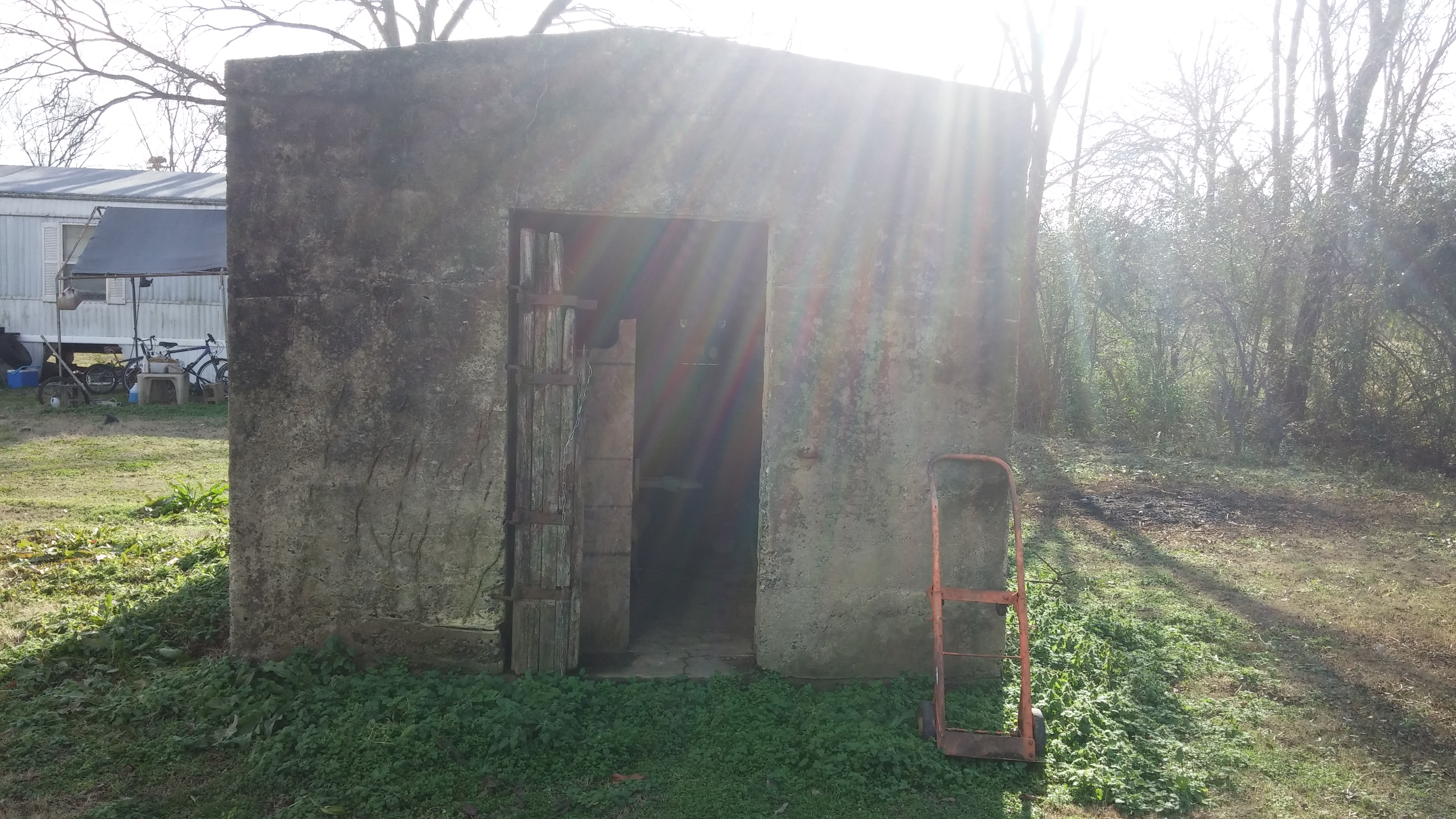
The town Jail of Plumerville, Arkansas. Built around 1880

=== Assassination ===
John Middleton Clayton (October 13, 1840 – January 29, 1889) was a Republican carpetbagger to Arkansas, originally from Pennsylvania. He was also the younger brother of Powell Clayton, a Governor of Arkansas.

In 1871, John Clayton was elected to the Arkansas House of Representatives, representing Jefferson County, and in 1873 he served in the Arkansas Senate representing Jefferson, Bradley, Grant and Lincoln counties, also serving as Speaker of the Senate pro tempore for part of his term.

He is best remembered today from his mysterious assassination in 1889. In 1888, he ran for the office of Arkansas's 2nd congressional district in the United States House of Representatives, going up against incumbent Democrat Clifton R. Breckinridge. The election became one of the most fraudulent in Arkansas' history. Clayton lost the election by a margin of 846 votes of over 34,000 votes cast. However, in one case in Conway County, four masked, armed white men stormed into a predominantly black voting precinct and, at gunpoint, stole the ballot box that contained a large majority of votes for Clayton. Losing under such circumstances, Clayton decided to contest the election and went to Plumerville to start an investigation on the matter. On the evening of January 29, 1889, an unknown assailant shot through the window to the room he was staying in at a local boarding house (still standing at 101 N. Springfield Street) and killed him instantly. He was later declared the winner of the election and Breckinridge was unseated and the seat declared vacant. Clayton's assassin was never found. Breckinridge was not found guilty in any wrongdoing in the rigged election or in Clayton's assassination and was elected to fill the vacant seat in 1890.

== Education ==
It is within the South Conway County School District. It operates Morrilton High School.

In 1980 the East Side, Morrilton, and Plumerville School districts consolidated to form the new South Conway County district.

Virtual Arkansas, a provider of online supplemental courses for high school students, has its administrative offices located at the former Plumerville School District campus on Bulldog Drive.

== Notable people ==
- Paxton Crawford (1977-) Major league baseball player
- Maurice Jeffers (1979-) Professional basketball player
- John H. Yancey, (1918-1986) Highly decorated United States Marine Corps combat veteran of World War II and the Korean War.
