= Menifee, Arkansas =

- Town
- Location of Menifee in Conway County, Arkansas.
- Coordinates: 35°8′55″N 92°33′12″W
- Country: United States
- State: Arkansas
- County: Conway

Area
  - Total: 2.27 sq mi (5.89 km^{2})
  - Land: 2.27 sq mi (5.87 km^{2})
  - Water: 0.0077 sq mi (0.02 km^{2})
- Elevation: 318 ft (97 m)

Population (2020)
  - Total: 274
  - Estimate (2025): 312 ▲
  - Density: 120.9/sq mi (46.68/km^{2})
- Time zone: UTC-6 (Central (CST))
  - Summer (DST): UTC-5 (CDT)
- ZIP code: 72107
- Area code: 501
- FIPS code: 05-45200
- GNIS feature ID: 0058165
- Website: www.cityofmenifeear.org

Menifee is a town in Conway County, Arkansas, United States. As of the 2020 census, Menifee had a population of 274.

== Geography ==
Menifee is located in southeastern Conway County at 35°8′55″N 92°33′12″W (35.148602, −92.553318). U.S. Route 64 passes through the center of the town, leading southeast 9 miles (14 km) to Conway and west 11 miles (18 km) to Morrilton, the Conway County seat. Interstate 40 serves the town with one exit.

According to the United States Census Bureau, the town has a total area of 2.2 square miles (5.7 km^{2}), of which 0.0077 square miles (0.02 km^{2}), or 0.35%, is water.

== Demographics ==
Historical population
Census	Pop.	Note	%±
1970	251		—
1980	368		46.6%
1990	355		−3.5%
2000	311		−12.4%
2010	302		−2.9%
2020	274		−9.3%
2025 (est.)	312	▲	13.9%
U.S. Decennial Census

=== Racial and ethnic composition ===
Menifee town, Arkansas – Racial and ethnic composition Note: the US Census treats Hispanic/Latino as an ethnic category. This table excludes Latinos from the racial categories and assigns them to a separate category. Hispanics/Latinos may be of any race.
Race / Ethnicity (NH = Non-Hispanic)	Pop 2000	Pop 2010	Pop 2020	% 2000	% 2010	% 2020
White alone (NH)	37	21	37	11.90%	6.95%	13.50%
Black or African American alone (NH)	263	251	208	84.57%	83.11%	75.91%
Native American or Alaska Native alone (NH)	0	0	0	0.00%	0.00%	0.00%
Asian alone (NH)	0	0	1	0.00%	0.00%	0.36%
Native Hawaiian or Pacific Islander alone (NH)	0	0	0	0.00%	0.00%	0.00%
Other race alone (NH)	0	0	0	0.00%	0.00%	0.00%
Mixed race or Multiracial (NH)	5	12	12	1.61%	3.97%	4.38%
Hispanic or Latino (any race)	6	18	16	1.93%	5.96%	5.84%
Total	311	302	274	100.00%	100.00%	100.00%

=== 2020 census ===
As of the 2020 United States census, there were 274 people, 45 households, and 30 families residing in the town.

=== 2000 census ===
As of the census of 2000, there were 311 people, 116 households, and 83 families residing in the town. The population density was 54.3/km^{2} (141.0/mi^{2}). There were 141 housing units at an average density of 24.6/km^{2} (63.9/mi^{2}). The racial makeup of the town was 11.90% White, 84.57% Black or African American, and 3.54% from two or more races. 1.93% of the population were Hispanic or Latino of any race.

There were 116 households, out of which 34.5% had children under the age of 18 living with them, 44.8% were married couples living together, 19.0% had a female householder with no husband present, and 28.4% were non-families. 26.7% of all households were made up of individuals, and 19.0% had someone living alone who was 65 years of age or older. The average household size was 2.68 and the average family size was 3.20.

In the town, the population was spread out, with 28.9% under the age of 18, 9.0% from 18 to 24, 25.1% from 25 to 44, 19.6% from 45 to 64, and 17.4% who were 65 years of age or older. The median age was 37 years. For every 100 females, there were 85.1 males. For every 100 females age 18 and over, there were 82.6 males.

The median income for a household in the town was $27,500, and the median income for a family was $34,750. Males had a median income of $27,500 versus $20,859 for females. The per capita income for the town was $12,624. About 8.6% of families and 10.8% of the population were below the poverty line, including 11.0% of those under age 18 and 14.5% of those age 65 or over.

== Notable natives and residents ==
- Dr. Richard Green, first black chancellor of the New York City Board of Education
- Monk Higgins, musician
