= Winrock, Arkansas =

Unincorporated community in Arkansas, US

Coordinates: 35°08′17″N 92°56′38″W

Winrock is an unincorporated community in Conway County, Arkansas, United States. It is the location of, or closest community to, multiple historic sites that are listed on the National Register of Historic Places.

== See also ==
- National Register of Historic Places listings in Conway County, Arkansas
