= William L. Moose =

William Lewis Moose Sr. (August 28, 1857-September 7, 1915) was an American politician, judge, and attorney general. He served as President of the Arkansas Senate. He graduated from Vanderbilt University in 1879. He was elected to the Arkansas Senate in 1895 and reelected in 1897. He was elected as Attorney General of Arkansas in 1912 and reelected in 1914.

He was born in Morrilton, Arkansas the second son of James N. Moose and Sophia E. Moose. A Democrat, he served as Arkansas Attorney General from 1913 to 1915 when he died while holding the office.

Linnie Porterfield Bright Moose was his wife. They had eight children. Nellie B. Mack, who also worked in Morrilton, was his sister-in-law.

== See also ==
- Moose (surname)
- James Sayle Moose Jr.
- Moose Addition Neighborhood Historic District, the oldest residential area in Morrilton
- Moose House, a historic house at 711 Green Street in Morrilton
