= Conway County Courthouse =

- U.S. National Register of Historic Places
- U.S. Historic district – Contributing property
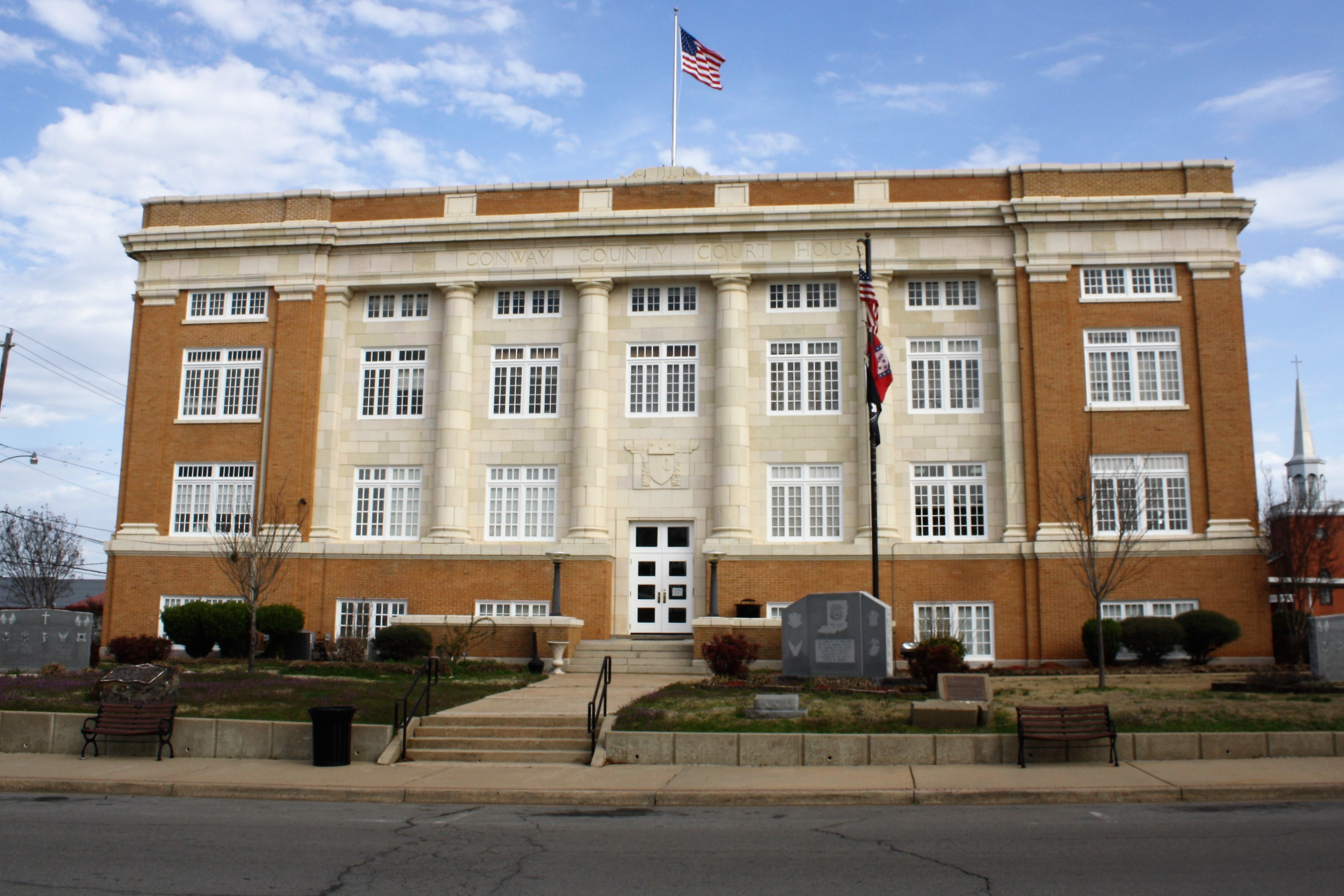

- Location within Arkansas Location within the United States
- Location: 117 S. Moose Street; Morrilton, Arkansas
- Coordinates: 35°9′5″N 92°44′37″W
- Area: less than one acre
- Built: 1929
- Architect: Frank W. Gibb
- Architectural style: Classical Revival, Art Deco
- Part of: Moose Addition Neighborhood Historic District (2015 increase) (ID15000258)
- NRHP reference No.: 89001960

Significant dates
- Added to NRHP: November 13, 1989
- Designated CP: May 26, 2015

The Conway County Courthouse is located at 117 S. Moose Street in downtown Morrilton, Arkansas, the county seat of Conway County. It is a 2 1/2-story masonry building, built out of red brick with trim of white concrete and white terra cotta. Dominating the main facade are five slightly recessed bays, articulated by four two-story engaged round columns, and flanked by square pilasters. The outer bays of the facade are each flanked by brick pilasters with cast terra cotta bases and capitals. The courthouse was built in 1929 to a design by Arkansas architect Frank W. Gibb.

The building was listed on the National Register of Historic Places in 1989.

== See also ==
- National Register of Historic Places listings in Conway County, Arkansas
