= Aycock House =

Historic house in Arkansas, United States

- U.S. National Register of Historic Places
- U.S. Historic district – Contributing property
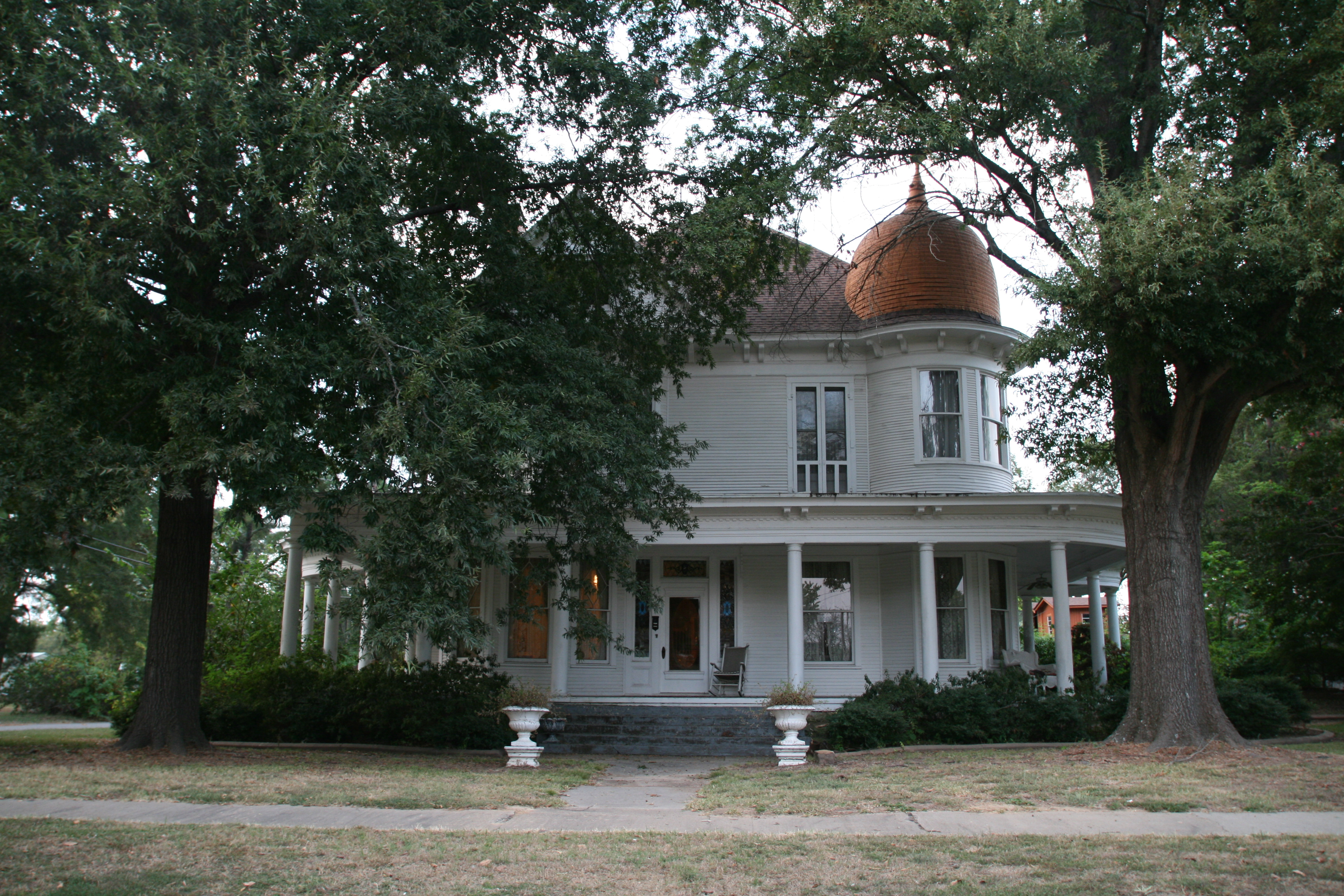

- Location within Arkansas Location within the United States
- Location: 410 W. Church Street, Morrilton, Arkansas
- Coordinates: 35°9′6″N 92°45′1″W
- Area: less than one acre
- Built: 1904
- Part of: West Church Street Historic District (ID15000259)
- NRHP reference No.: 76000397

Significant dates
- Added to NRHP: May 13, 1976
- Designated CP: May 25, 2015

The Aycock House (also known as the Aycock-Jamell House) is a historic house located at 410 West Church Street in Morrilton, Arkansas.

== Description and history ==
Built in 1904 by Elmo Ayock, it is one of the most unusual and elegant houses of the period in the city. It is 2 1/2 stories in height, with a tall hipped-roof pierced by dormers, and a round corner tower with conical roof. A porch wraps around two sides of the house, with round posts and a bracketed cornice. The interior features extremely high quality woodwork, including a staircase constructed from imported English walnut.

The house was listed on the National Register of Historic Places on May 13, 1976.

== See also ==
- National Register of Historic Places listings in Conway County, Arkansas
