= Conway County Library =

- U.S. National Register of Historic Places
- U.S. Historic district – Contributing property
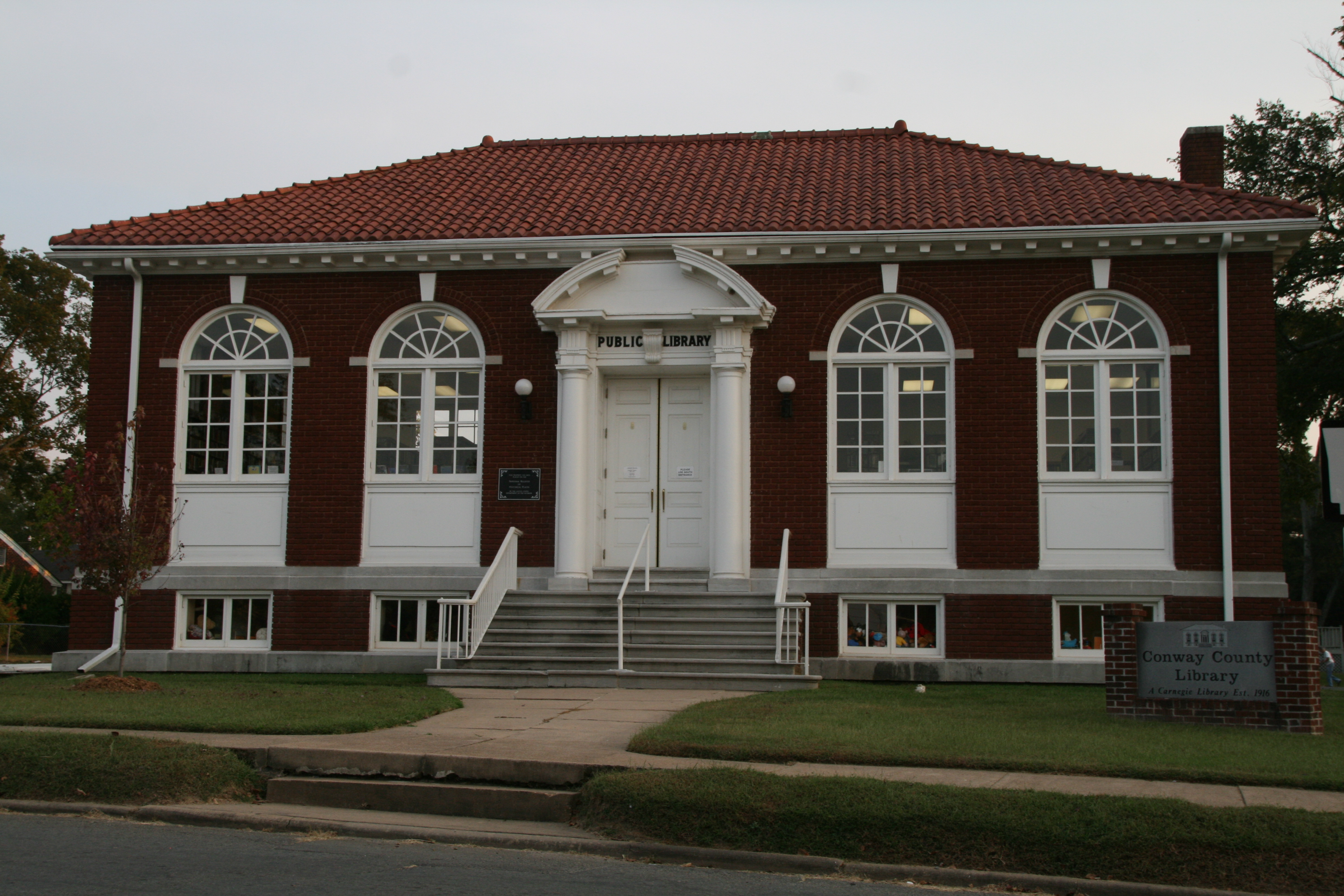

- Location within Arkansas Location within the United States
- Location: 101 W. Church St., Morrilton, Arkansas
- Coordinates: 35°9′4″N 92°44′45″W
- Area: less than one acre
- Built: 1916
- Architect: Harding, Thomas
- Part of: Moose Addition Neighborhood Historic District (2015 increase) (ID15000258)
- NRHP reference No.: 78000581

Significant dates
- Added to NRHP: April 15, 1978
- Designated CP: May 26, 2015

The Conway County Library is the public library system of Conway County, Arkansas. The main library is located at 101 West Church Street in downtown Morrilton, Arkansas, the county seat. The library is located in a Classical Revival brick building designed by Thomas Harding and funded in part by a grant from Andrew Carnegie. In 1916 the Pathfinder Club of Morrilton applied for the grant. A lot was purchased, and Morrilton Mayor J. A. Frisby, Night Rainwater, and W. M. Riddick worked with a committee to construct the new library. The construction cost was $7,500, leaving $2,500 to purchase coal and furniture for the building. The building was completed in October 1916 and still serves as the Conway County Library. The building was listed on the National Register of Historic Places in 1978. The library organization began as a private collection in 1894, and was housed in private residences and vacant commercial buildings prior to the construction of this building.

== See also ==
- National Register of Historic Places listings in Conway County, Arkansas
- List of Carnegie libraries in Arkansas
