= List of Carnegie libraries in Arkansas =

Arkansas Carnegie libraries

The following list of Carnegie libraries in Arkansas provides detailed information on United States Carnegie libraries in Arkansas, where four libraries were built from four grants (totaling $138,600) awarded by the Carnegie Corporation of New York from 1906 to 1915.

== Key ==
Building still operating as a library
Building standing, but now serving another purpose
Building no longer standing
Building listed on the National Register of Historic Places

== Carnegie libraries ==
	Library	City or town	Image	Date granted	Grant amount	Location	Notes
1	Eureka Springs	Eureka Springs		Apr 23, 1906	$15,500	194 Spring St. 36°24′27.29″N 93°44′11.88″W	Construction began in 1910 after the building site was donated by R.C. Kerens, prominent investor in the nearby Crescent Hotel. The design for the building was prepared by St. Louis architect George W. Hellmuth. The building was completed in 1912, and was originally open only three afternoons a week as the library depended on memberships and contributions for income. By 1920 the library was open six days a week, and a year later the building was supplied with electrical lighting. This library continues to serve the community.
2	Fort Smith	Fort Smith		Mar 24, 1906	$25,000	318 N. 13th St. 35°23′8.2″N 94°24′56.92″W	After opening on January 30, 1908, this building housed the Fort Smith Public Library until November 1970, when the library moved to a new building on South 8th Street. KFSM-TV then adapted the building as a television studio until 2019, when the station moved to a purpose-built facility in Johnson. The building was purchased at auction by University of Arkansas–Fort Smith professor and preservationist Diana Sims in 2024 for $149,000 to restore it to its library-era state.
3	Little Rock	Little Rock		Mar 24, 1906	$88,100	W. 7th St. and S. Louisiana St. 34°44′31.95″N 92°16′23.03″W	Opening on February 1, 1910, this building was razed in 1964.
4	Morrilton	Morrilton		Sep 20, 1915	$10,000	101 W. Church St. 35°9′4.07″N 92°44′43.64″W	Opened in October 1916, this library continues to serve the community as the Conway County Library.

== See also ==
- List of libraries in the United States
