= BDQ =

BDQ may refer to:

== Transport ==
- Bradford Forster Square railway station, in West Yorkshire, England
- Morrilton Municipal Airport, in Arkansas, United States
- Vadodara Airport, in Gujarat, India

== Chemicals and Substances ==
- Bedaquiline, a drug used to treat tuberculosis

== Other uses ==
- Bahnar language, a language of Vietnam
- Quebec comics (French: Bande dessinée québécoise)
- Vietnamese Rangers (Vietnamese: Biệt Động Quân), of South Vietnam
