= James Sayle Moose Jr. =

American diplomat

James Sayle Moose Jr. (October 3, 1903 – January 19, 1989) was an American diplomat who served as ambassador to several countries.

== Early life ==
Moose was born in Morrilton, Arkansas in 1903. After studying at the Kentucky Military Institute and graduating in 1922 from the University of Missouri at 18, he married Eleanor Duncan Wood of Maysville, Kentucky also in 1922. He then moved to Little Rock Arkansas and then to his hometown for a period of five years. In 1928 he joined the Foreign Service.

== Career ==
His diplomatic work focused on the Middle East. His first assignment was in Thessaloniki, Greece where he served as vice consul. Soon afterward he went to Paris, where he studied Arabic, Amharic, French, and Turkish at the Institut national des langues et civilisations orientales, but by 1933 he was back in the Middle East with a posting in Baghdad. Four years later he was posted in Tehran, where he had his first child, James S. Moose, III. In 1942 he had his second child, Eleanor Duncan Wood Moose (Lady Whittome).

In 1943, Moose became the second accredited U.S. representative to Saudi Arabia (following Bert Fish) as chargé d'affaires, but the first to officially reside in Jeddah, where he opened the American legation on May 1, 1942. He served until mid-1944 although he remained involved in Saudi-American relations until later in 1945 including helping arrange the meeting between the King of Saudi Arabia, Abdul-Aziz Ibn Saud, and President Franklin D. Roosevelt in the Gulf of Suez in 1945.

From mid 1945 to the end of 1946 he was Charge D'Affaire in Baghdad Iraq and then in 1947 was Charge D'Affaire in Damascus Syria. During the period 1947-52 he was an inspector in the Foreign Service. In 1952 he was appointed Minister and then Ambassador to Syria. In 1957, after an unsuccessful CIA coup to overthrow the Government of Syria, the Syrians demanded Moose's recall. In 1958 he was appointed US Ambassador to the Sudan where he served until 1962.

After retiring from the Foreign Service in 1962, Moose served one year as a professor at the University of Massachusetts in Amherst Mass. He then retired first to Kentucky and second to Arkansas. He moved back into the family house in Morrilton Ark. and was there when he became ill and died in January 1989. His wife, Eleanor Moose, died a few months later. He is survived by his son and daughter, four grandchildren and six great-grandchildren (2016).

== See also ==
- Moose (surname)
- William L. Moose
- Moose House, a historic house at 711 Green Street in Morrilton

Diplomatic posts
Preceded by Lowell C. Pinkerton	United States Ambassador to Sudan; 1958–1962	Succeeded by William M. Rountree
Preceded by post created	United States Ambassador to Syria; 1952–1957	Succeeded by Charles W. Yost
