= Arkansas Christian College Administration Building =

- U.S. National Register of Historic Places
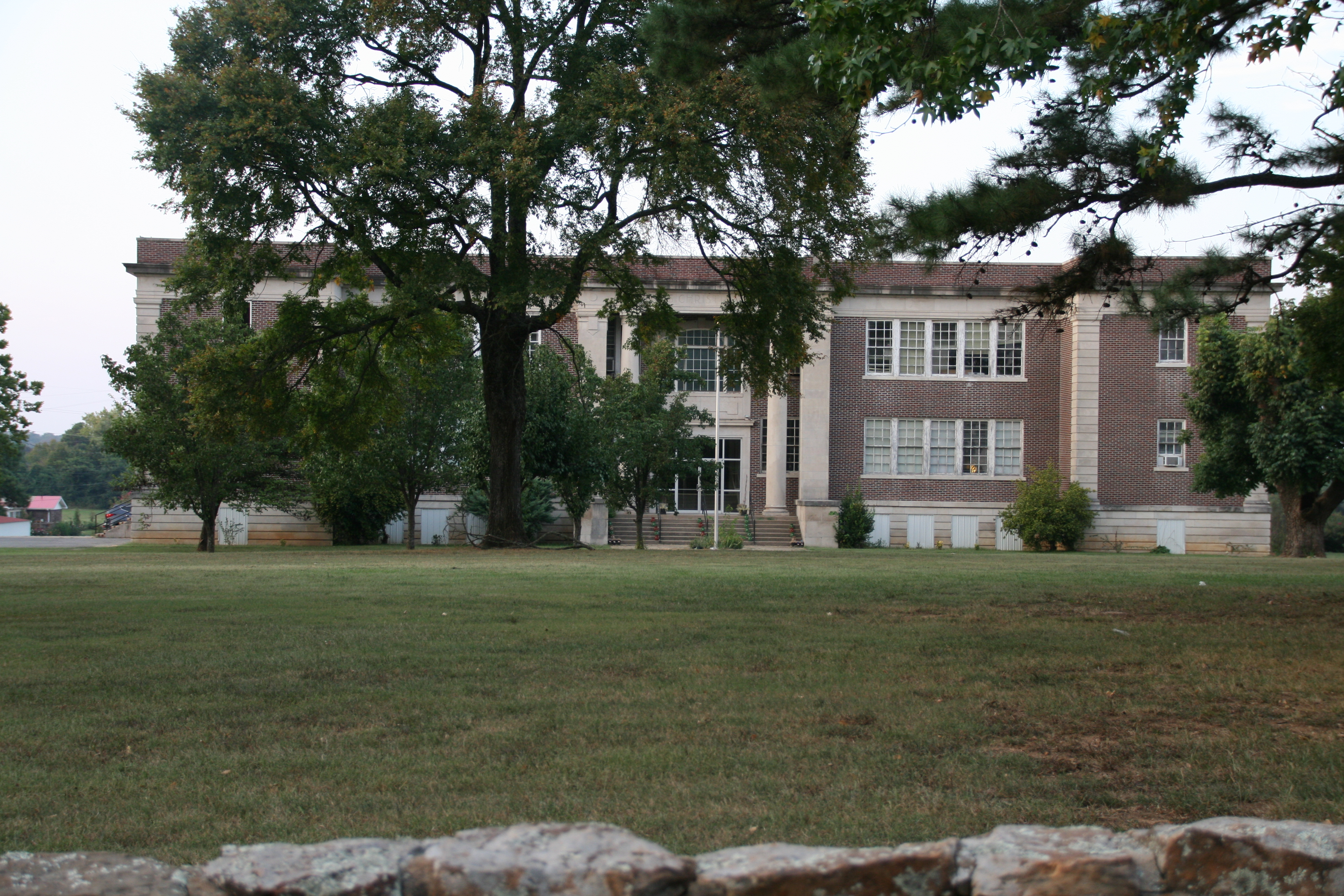

- Location within Arkansas Location within the United States
- Location: 100 W. Harding St., Morrilton, Arkansas
- Coordinates: 35°9′51″N 92°44′36″W
- Area: less than one acre
- Built by: Stewart & Russell
- Architect: Wittenberg & Delony
- Architectural style: Colonial Revival
- NRHP reference No.: 13001101
- Added to NRHP: January 22, 2014

The Arkansas Christian College Administration Building is a former school building at 100 West Harding Street in Morrilton, Arkansas. It is a two-story masonry structure with Colonial Revival features, built in 1919-20 for the newly founded Arkansas Christian College. The college was the second higher education facility in Morrilton, and was an important part of the city's early 20th-century educational history. The school merged with Harper College in 1924 to become Harding College, and moved to Searcy, Arkansas in 1934. The building, the only surviving element of the school's Morrilton history, is now home to the Southern Christian Home, a charity that places needy children.

The building was designed by Wittenberg & Delony, Little Rock architects, and built by Stewart & Russell, Conway contractors.

The building was listed on the National Register of Historic Places in 2014.

== See also ==
- National Register of Historic Places listings in Conway County, Arkansas
