= W. L. Wood House =

Historic house in Arkansas, United States

- U.S. National Register of Historic Places
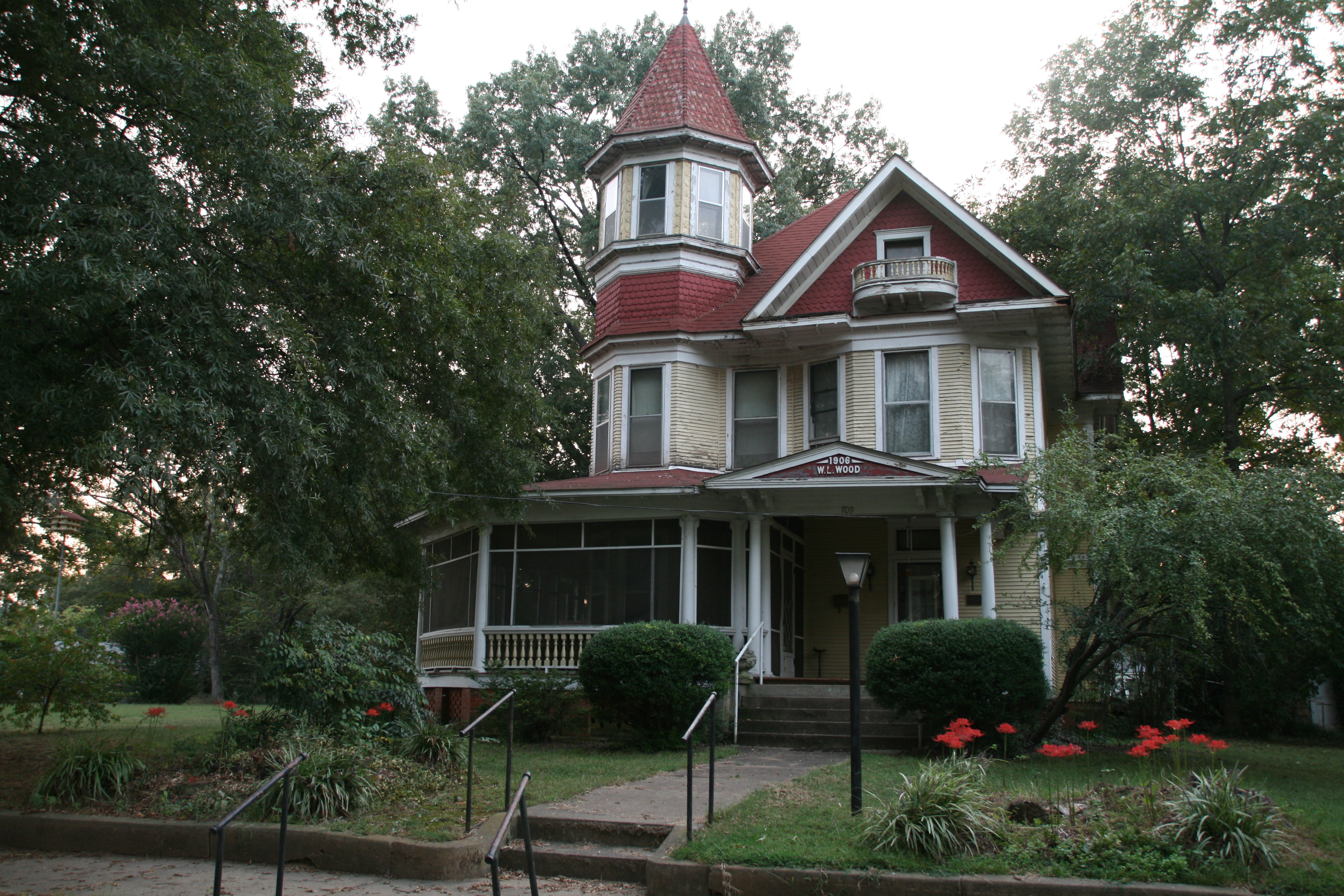

- Location within Arkansas Location within the United States
- Location: 709 N. Morrill St., Morrilton, Arkansas
- Coordinates: 35°9′40″N 92°44′46″W
- Area: 2 acres (0.81 ha)
- Built: 1905
- Architectural style: Queen Anne
- NRHP reference No.: 02000604
- Added to NRHP: June 6, 2002

The W. L. Wood House is a historic house at 709 North Morrill Street in Morrilton, Arkansas, United States. It is a 2 1/2-story wood-frame structure, with a hip roof, weatherboard exterior, and foundation of stone and brick. It has the asymmetrical massing typical of the Queen Anne period, with a three-story turret at the left corner, and a porch that wraps across the front and around the base of the tower. The porch is supported by round columns and has a turned balustrade and a low gable over the main steps. A large gable that projects from the main roof has a rounded-corner balcony at its center. The interior has richly detailed woodwork in the Eastlake style. The house was purchased as a prefab from Sears & Roebuck, shipped by rail to Morrilton, moved to its current location by mule drawn wagon and built in 1905–06 for William L. Wood, a prominent local businessman.

The house was listed on the National Register of Historic Places in 2002.

== See also ==
- National Register of Historic Places listings in Conway County, Arkansas
