= First National Bank of Morrilton =

- U.S. National Register of Historic Places
- U.S. Historic district – Contributing property
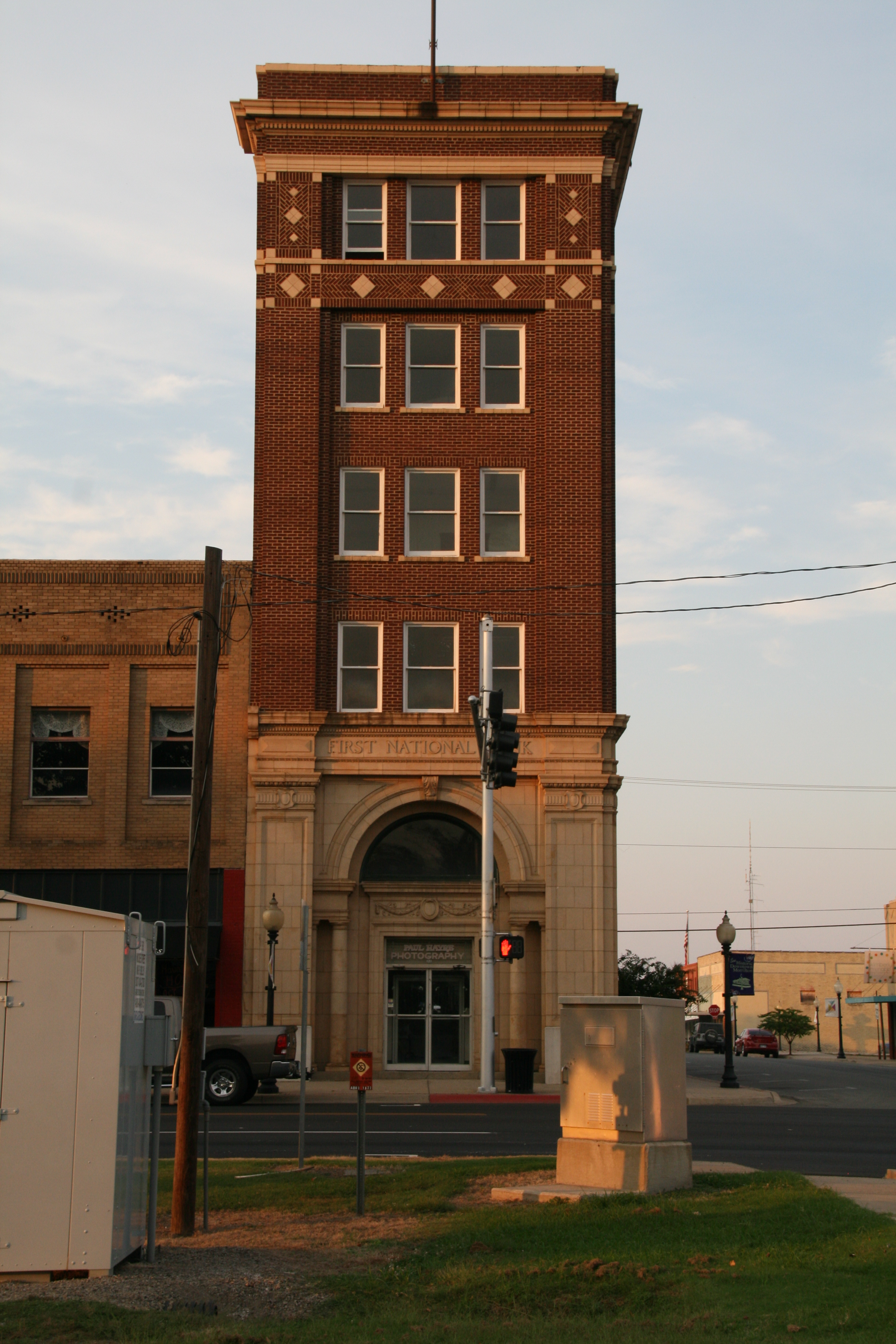

- Location within Arkansas Location within the United States
- Location: Main at Moose Sts., Morrilton, Arkansas
- Coordinates: 35°9′10″N 92°44′38″W
- Area: less than one acre
- Built: 1925
- Architect: Charles L. Thompson
- Architectural style: Classical Revival, Bungalow/Craftsman
- Part of: Morrilton Commercial Historic District (ID03000085)
- MPS: Thompson, Charles L., Design Collection TR
- NRHP reference No.: 82000804

Significant dates
- Added to NRHP: December 22, 1982
- Designated CP: August 14, 1998

The First National Bank of Morrilton is a historic commercial building at Broadway and Moose Streets in Morrilton, Arkansas. It is a narrow five-story masonry building, occupying a prominent location at the city's main downtown intersection. It was built in 1925 to a design by architect Charles L. Thompson, and has Classical Revival and Bungalow/Craftsman features. The short Broadway Street facade features a recessed entrance with Classical features, while the upper floors are relatively unadorned red brick, with Craftsman motifs in tile around the top floor windows.

The building was listed on the National Register of Historic Places.

== See also ==
- National Register of Historic Places listings in Conway County, Arkansas
