= Morrilton Commercial Historic District =

Historic district in Arkansas, United States

- U.S. National Register of Historic Places
- U.S. Historic district
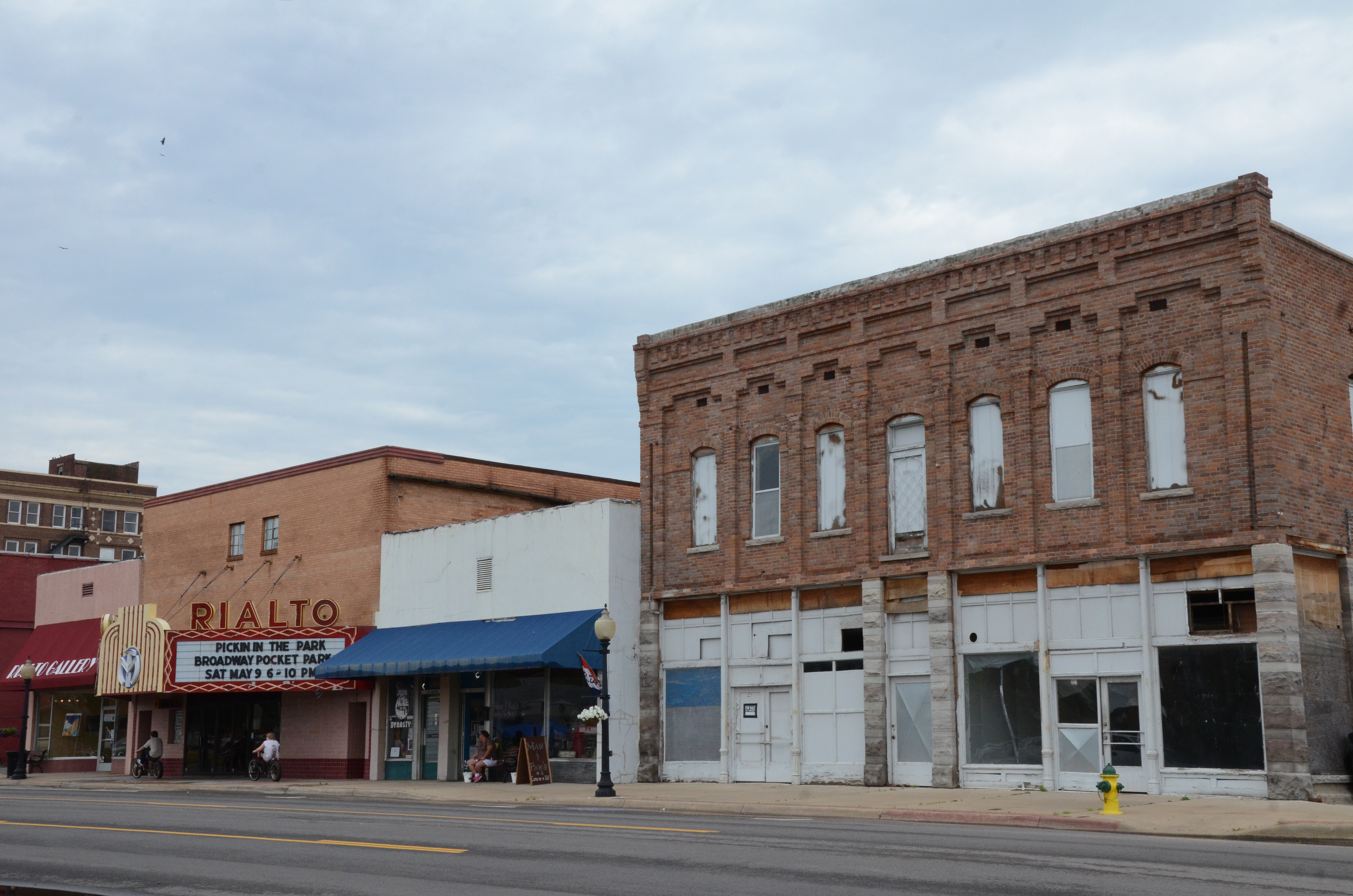

- Location within Arkansas Location within the United States
- Location: Roughly bounded by E. Railroad, Broadway, N. Division and N. Moose Sts., Morrilton, Arkansas
- Coordinates: 35°9′13″N 92°44′39″W
- Area: 130 acres (53 ha)
- Architectural style: Early Commercial, Mission/spanish Revival
- NRHP reference No.: 03000085
- Added to NRHP: March 7, 2003

The Morrilton Commercial Historic District encompasses the historic central business district of Morrilton, Arkansas. The L-shaped district includes two blocks of East Railroad and East Broadway, between Division and Chestnut Streets, and three blocks of Division and Chestnut Streets, between Broadway and Vine. This area was mostly developed between 1880 and the 1920s, and was heavily influenced by the railroad, which passes between Broadway and Railroad. Prominent buildings in the district include the Morrilton Post Office, Morrilton Railroad Station, First National Bank of Morrilton, and the Coca-Cola Building.

The district was listed on the National Register of Historic Places in 2003.

== See also ==
- National Register of Historic Places listings in Conway County, Arkansas
