= Coca-Cola Building (Morrilton, Arkansas) =

- U.S. National Register of Historic Places
- U.S. Historic district – Contributing property
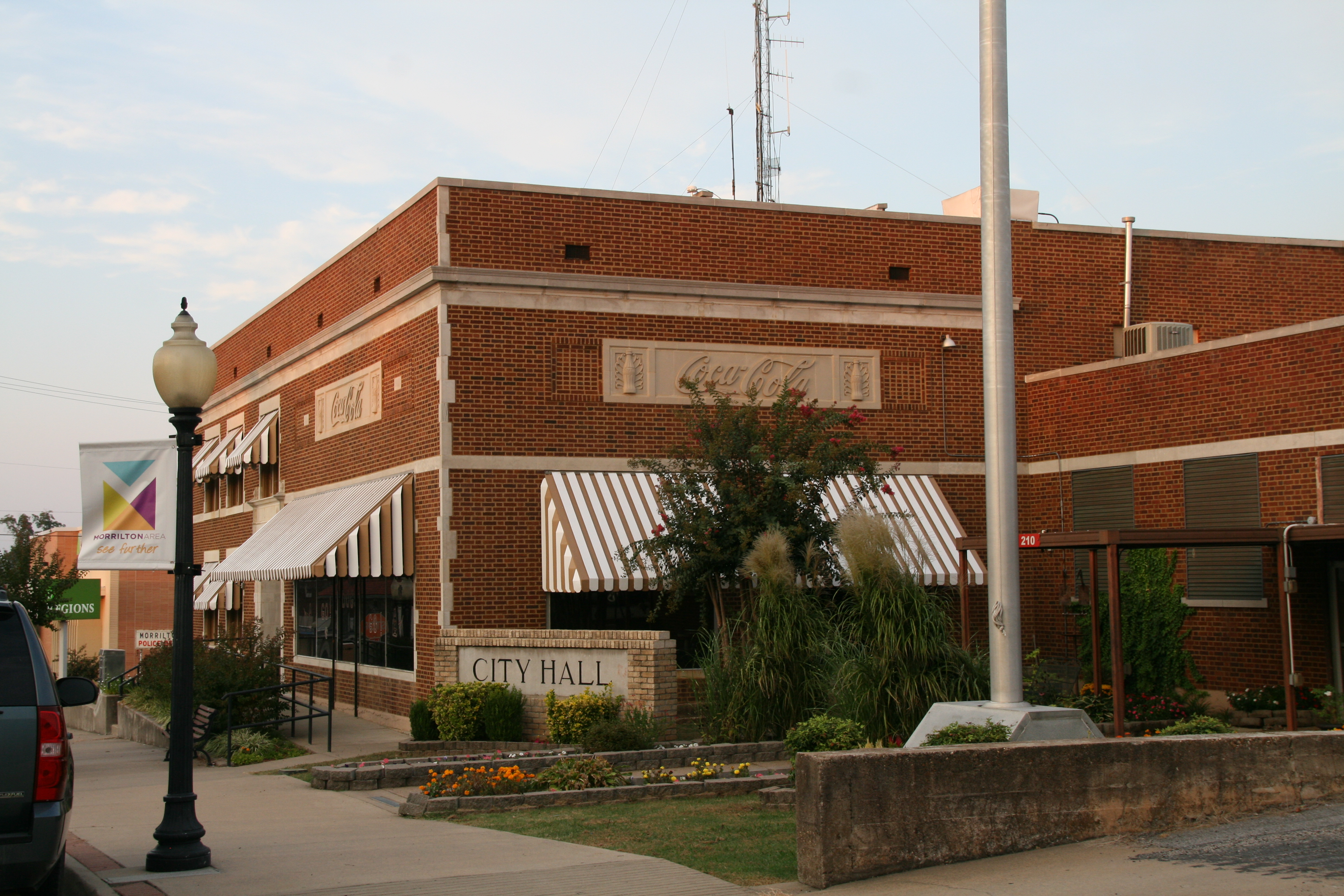

- Location within Arkansas Location within the United States
- Location: 211 N. Moose, Morrilton, Arkansas
- Coordinates: 35°9′15″N 92°44′35″W
- Area: less than one acre
- Built: 1929
- Architect: Thompson, Sanders & Ginocchio
- Architectural style: Colonial Revival, Modern Movement
- Part of: Morrilton Commercial Historic District (ID03000085)
- MPS: Thompson, Charles L., Design Collection TR
- NRHP reference No.: 82000803

Significant dates
- Added to NRHP: December 22, 1982
- Designated CP: August 14, 1998

The Coca-Cola Building is a historic commercial building at 211 North Moose Street in Morrilton, Arkansas. It is a two-story masonry structure, built out of red brick with limestone trim. It has relatively clean Colonial Revival lines, with stone string courses between floors, a stone cornice below a parapet, and stone panels carved with the stylized Coca-Cola logo. It was built in 1929 to a design by the noted Arkansas architectural firm Thompson, Sanders & Ginocchio.

During the 1960s the building served as the first home for Walmart store #8. The City of Morrilton used the building from the 1970s until 2019 as a home to city government and the Morrilton Police Department. In 2019, Crow Group purchased the building and relocated its administrative offices to the site.

The building was listed on the National Register of Historic Places in 1982.

== See also ==
- National Register of Historic Places listings in Conway County, Arkansas
