= Earl Building =

- U.S. National Register of Historic Places
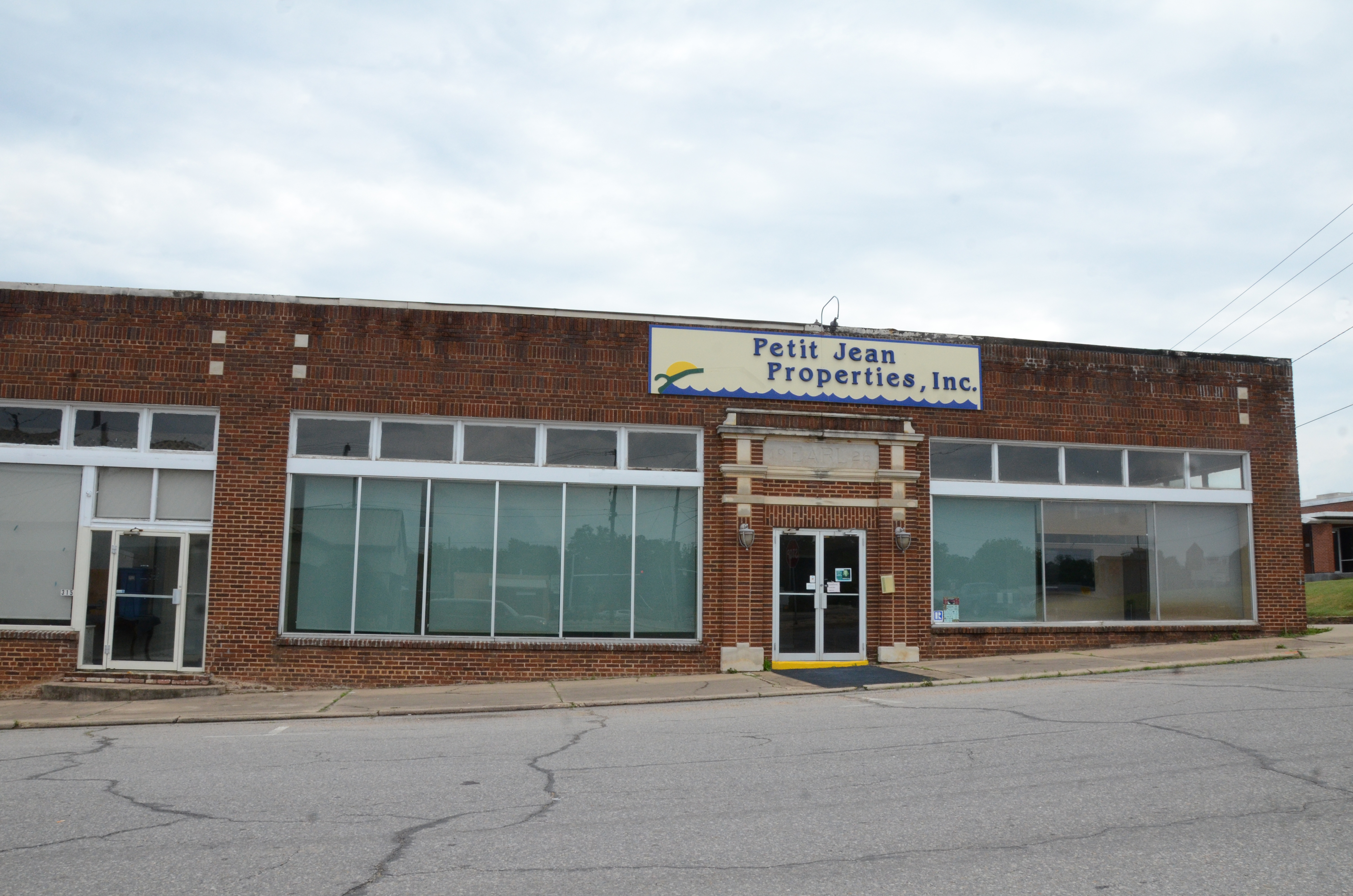

- Location within Arkansas Location within the United States
- Location: 201 North St. Joseph Street; Morrilton, Arkansas
- Coordinates: 35°9′19″N 92°44′29″W
- Area: less than one acre
- Built: 1926
- Architectural style: Early Commercial
- MPS: Arkansas Highway History and Architecture MPS
- NRHP reference No.: 08001336
- Added to NRHP: January 22, 2009

The Earl Building is a historic commercial building at 201 North St. Joseph Street in Morrilton, Arkansas. It is a single-story frame structure, with brick walls and a flat roof. It is roughly L-shaped, with one wing originally serving as an automotive showroom and the other as a service and supply area. It was built in 1926 and enlarged a few years later, and is a well-preserved example of a 1920s automotive dealership building.

The building was listed on the National Register of Historic Places in 2009.

== See also ==
- National Register of Historic Places listings in Conway County, Arkansas
