= Saint Anthony's Hospital (Morrilton, Arkansas) =

- U.S. National Register of Historic Places
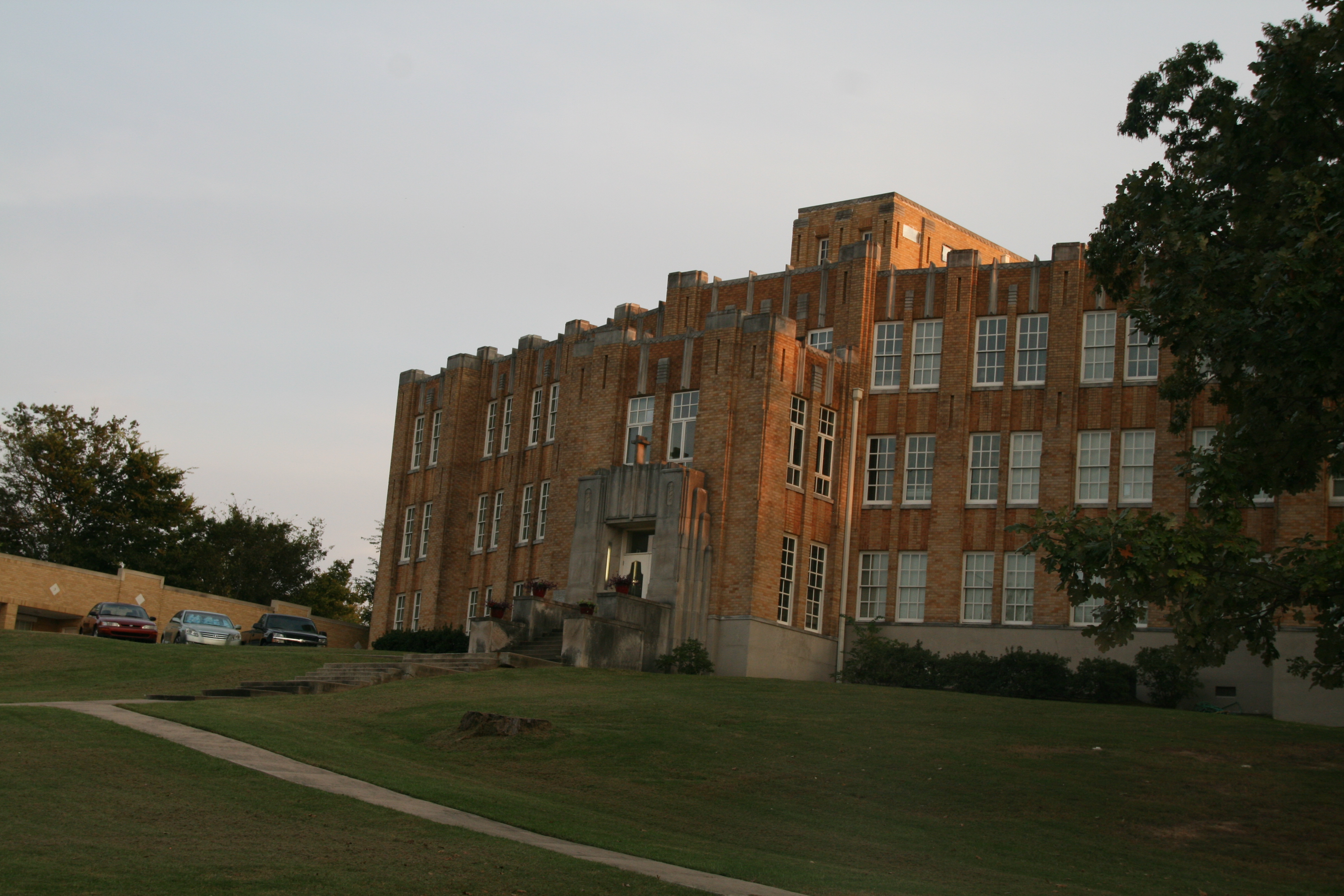

- Location within Arkansas Location within the United States
- Location: 202 E. Green St., Morrilton, Arkansas
- Coordinates: 35°8′51″N 92°44′37″W
- Built: 1935
- Architect: McAninch, A.N.; Leveck, J.H., & Son
- Architectural style: Art Deco
- NRHP reference No.: 86000581
- Added to NRHP: March 28, 1986

Saint Anthony's Hospital is a historic hospital building at 202 East Green Street in Morrilton, Arkansas. Built in 1935 to a design by A. N. McAninch, it is an Art Deco building, finished in brick and stone. It served as the local hospital until 1970, and is now a senior living facility. It is Morrilton's best example of Art Deco architecture. It has two splayed wings, with a central projecting entry pavilion.

The building was listed on the National Register of Historic Places in 1986.

== See also ==
- National Register of Historic Places listings in Conway County, Arkansas
