= Morrilton station =

- U.S. National Register of Historic Places
- U.S. Historic district – Contributing property
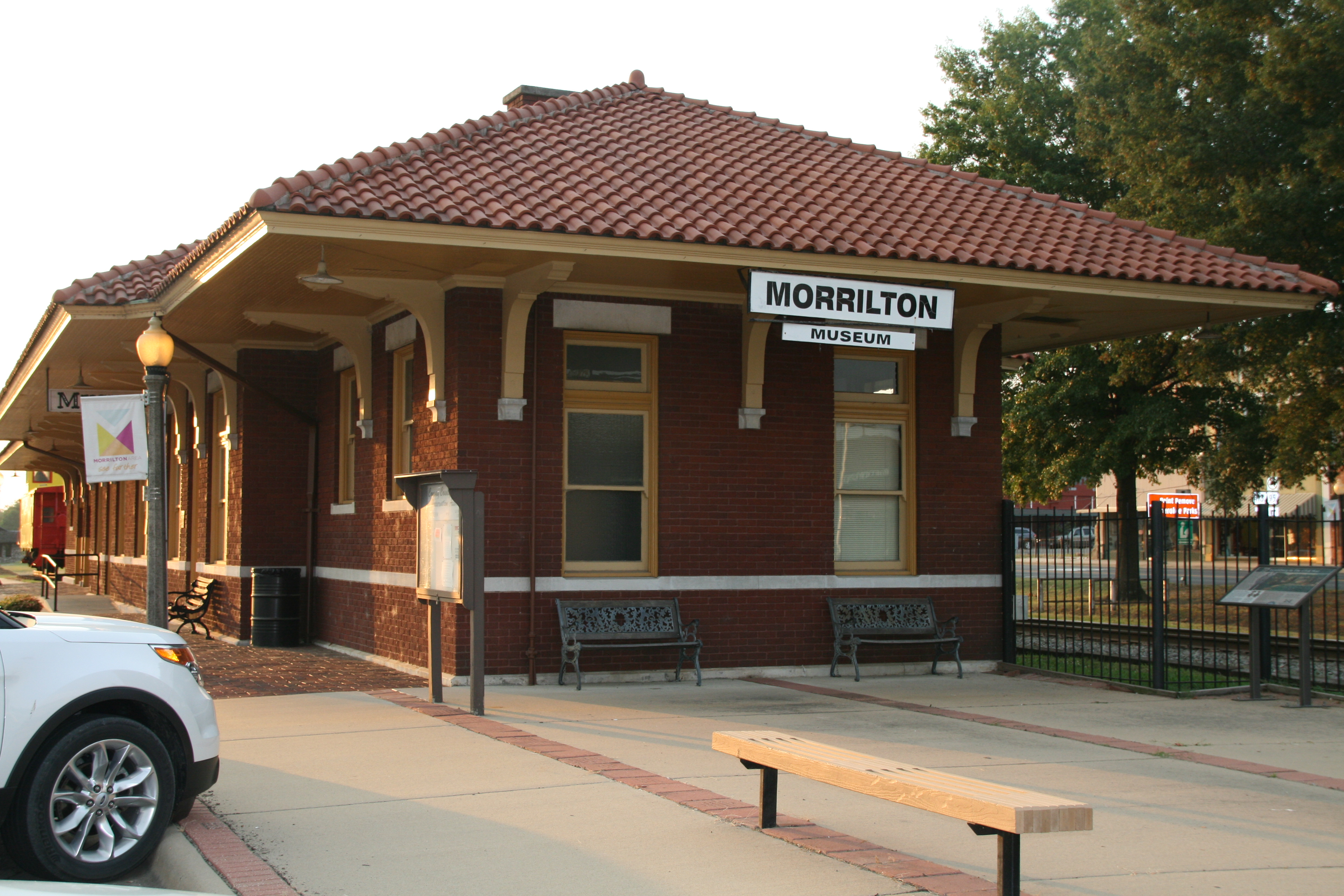

- Location within Arkansas Location within the United States
- Location: Railroad Ave. between Division and Moose Sts., Morrilton, Arkansas
- Coordinates: 35°8′55″N 92°44′40″W
- Area: less than one acre
- Built: 1875
- Built by: Missouri-Pacific Railroad
- Part of: Morrilton Commercial Historic District (ID03000085)
- NRHP reference No.: 77000249

Significant dates
- Added to NRHP: September 13, 1977
- Designated CP: August 14, 1998

The former Morrilton station is located on Railroad Avenue, between Division and Moose Streets, in downtown Morrilton, Arkansas. It is a single-story brick building, with a tile roof and Mediterranean styling typical of the stations of the Missouri Pacific Railroad. The broadly overhanging roof is supported by large brackets, with a telegrapher's bay projecting on the track side. Built about 1907, it is an important reminder of the railroad's importance in the city's history. It now houses a local history museum.

The building was listed on the National Register of Historic Places in 1977 as "Morrilton Railroad Station".

== See also ==
- National Register of Historic Places listings in Conway County, Arkansas
