= Morrilton Post Office =

- U.S. National Register of Historic Places
- U.S. Historic district – Contributing property
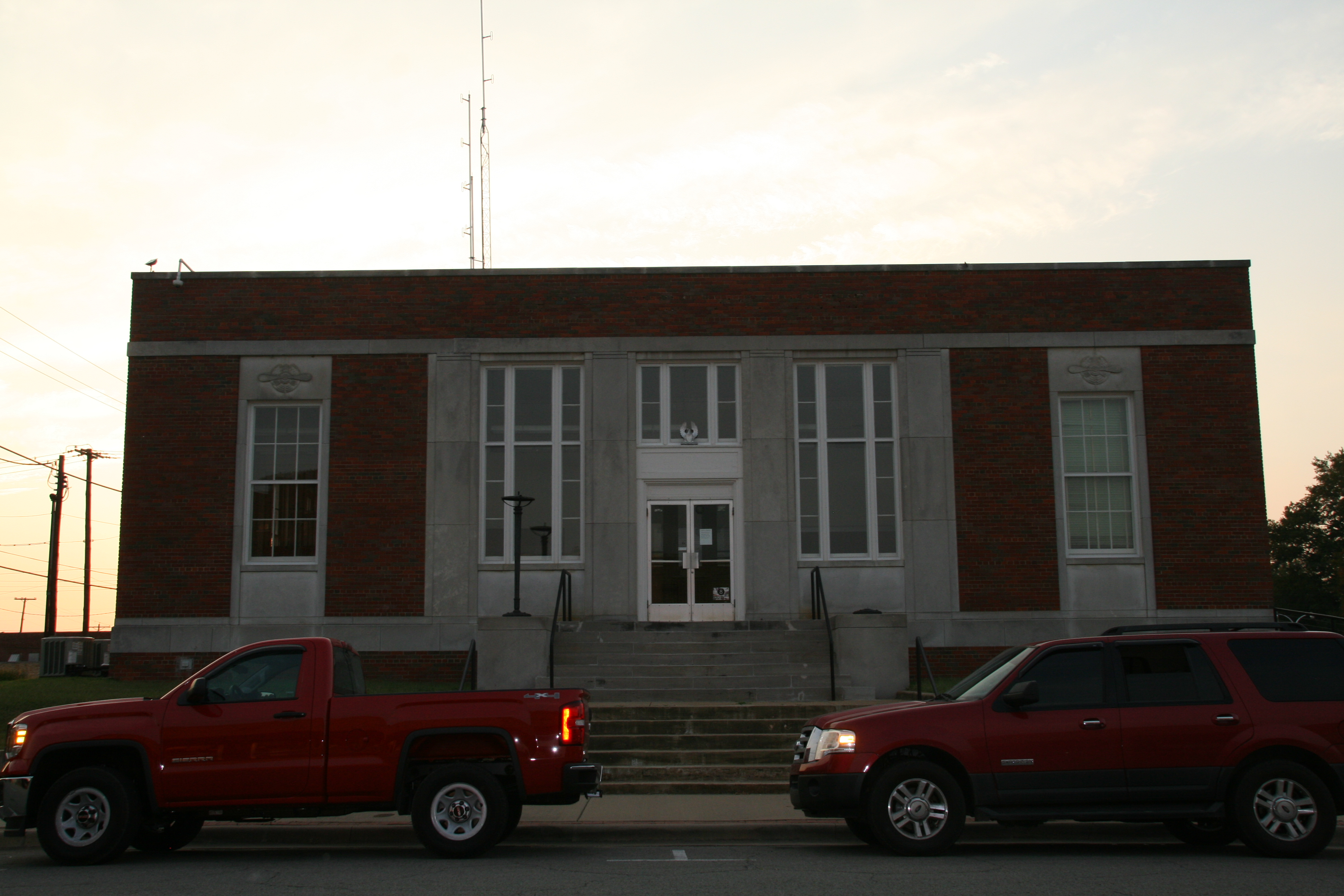

- Location within Arkansas Location within the United States
- Location: 117 N. Division St., Morrilton, Arkansas
- Coordinates: 35°9′14″N 92°44′42″W
- Area: less than one acre
- Built: 1936
- Architect: Richard Sargent, et al.
- Architectural style: Art Deco
- Part of: Morrilton Commercial Historic District (ID03000085)
- MPS: Post Offices with Section Art in Arkansas MPS
- NRHP reference No.: 98000921

Significant dates
- Added to NRHP: August 14, 1998
- Designated CP: August 14, 1998

The former Morrilton Post Office is a historic post office building at 117 North Division Street in downtown Morrilton, Arkansas. It is a single-story masonry structure, built of brick and limestone in a simplified Art Deco style. Its facade is divided into five bays, the outer two separated by brick piers from the inner three. The inner three are articulated by limestone pilasters, and feature large multipane windows and the main entrance. The interior features a mural entitled Men at Rest by Richard Sargent, painted in the 1930s as part of a federal works project.

The building was listed on the National Register of Historic Places in 1998.

The building currently houses the Conway County Office of Emergency Management and Conway County 911 Services.

== See also ==
- National Register of Historic Places listings in Conway County, Arkansas
- List of United States post offices
- List of United States post office murals
