= Morrilton, Arkansas =

- City
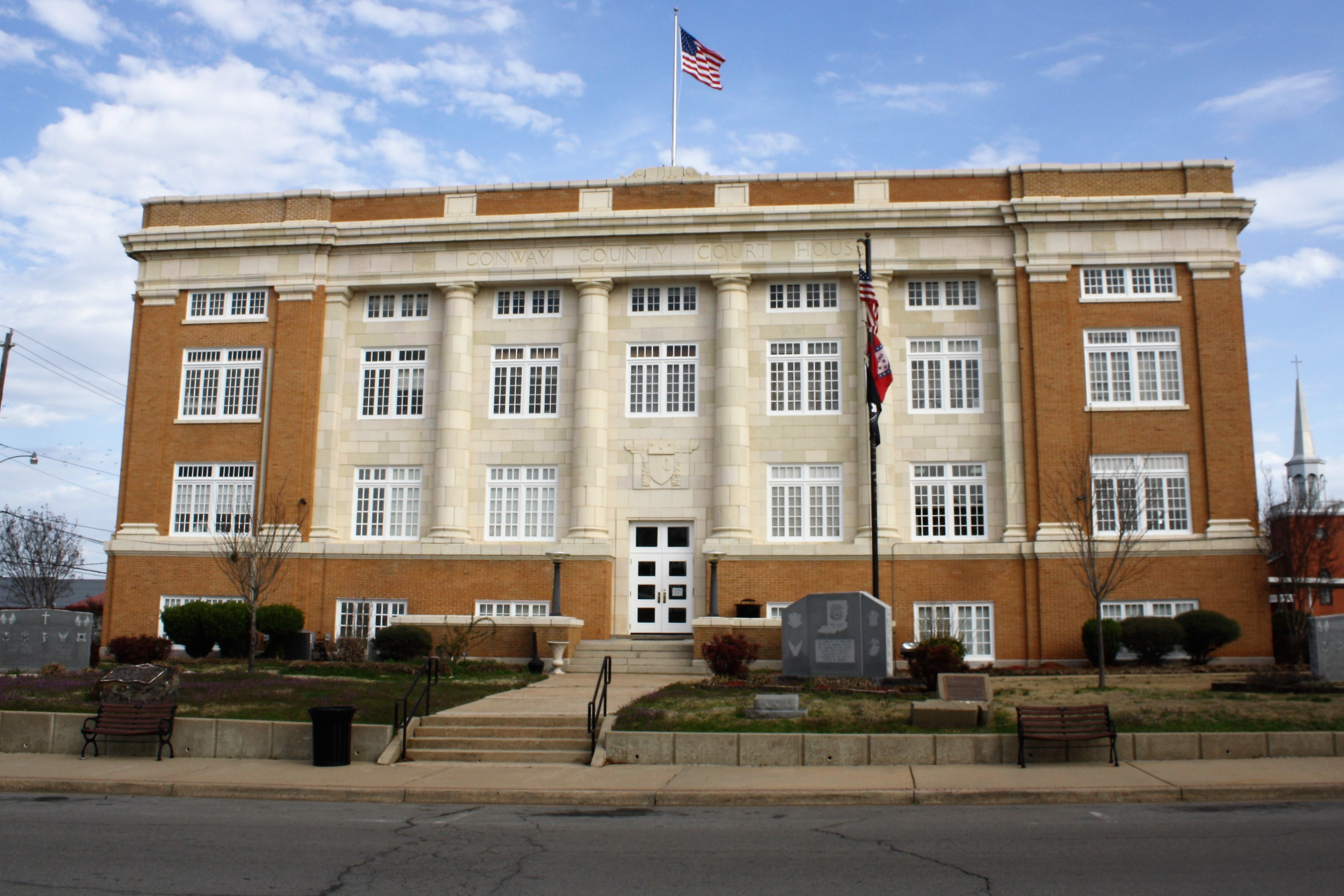
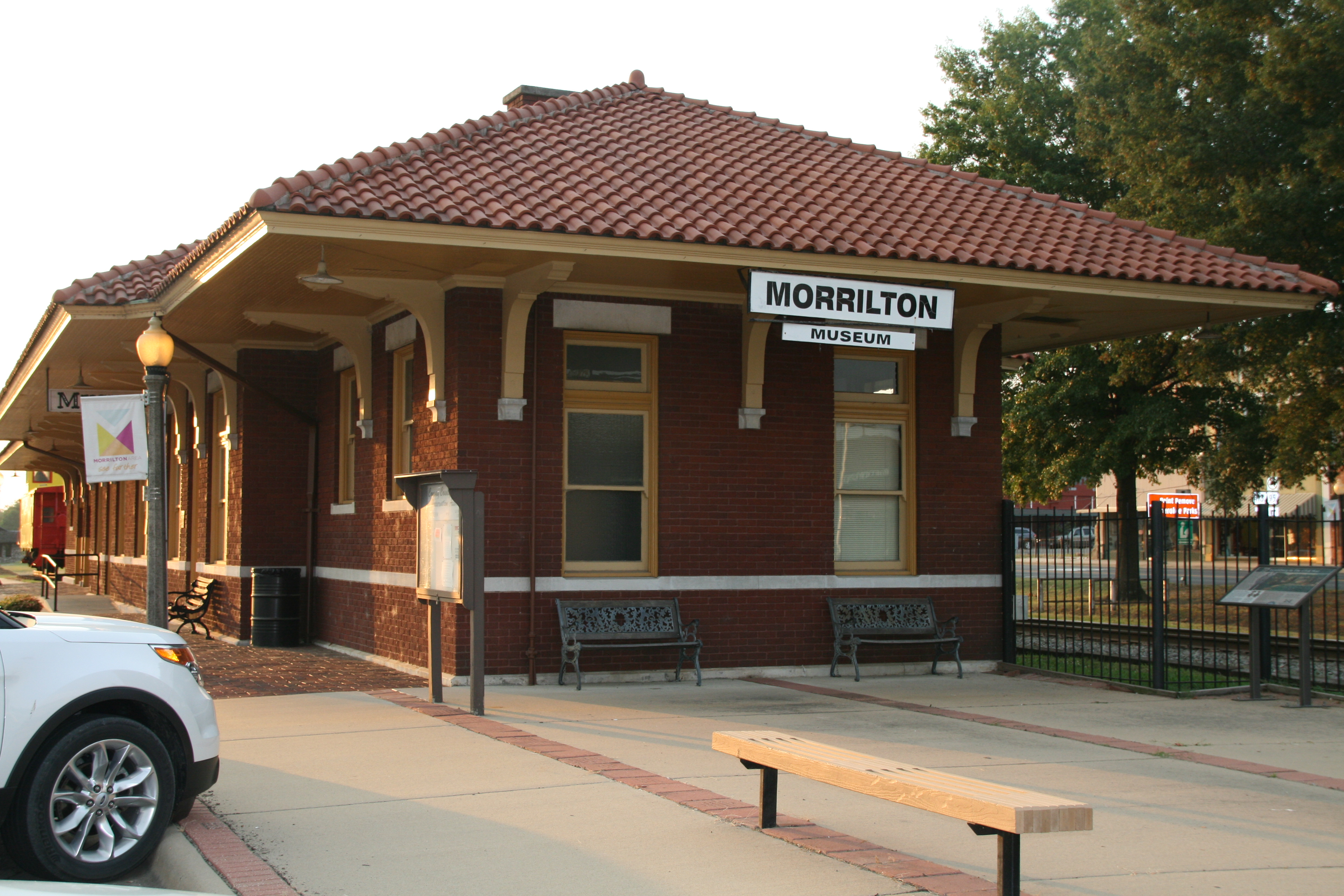
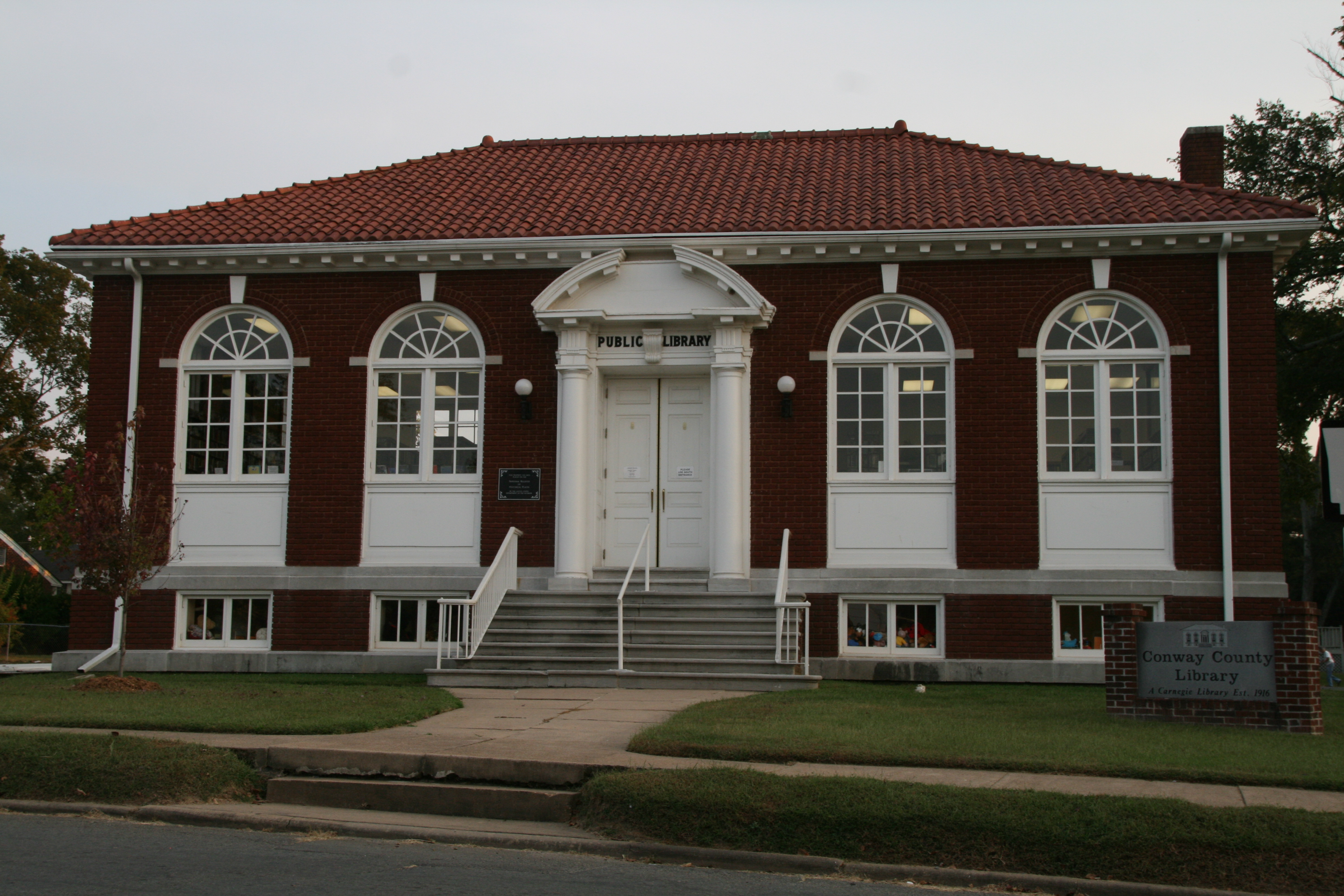
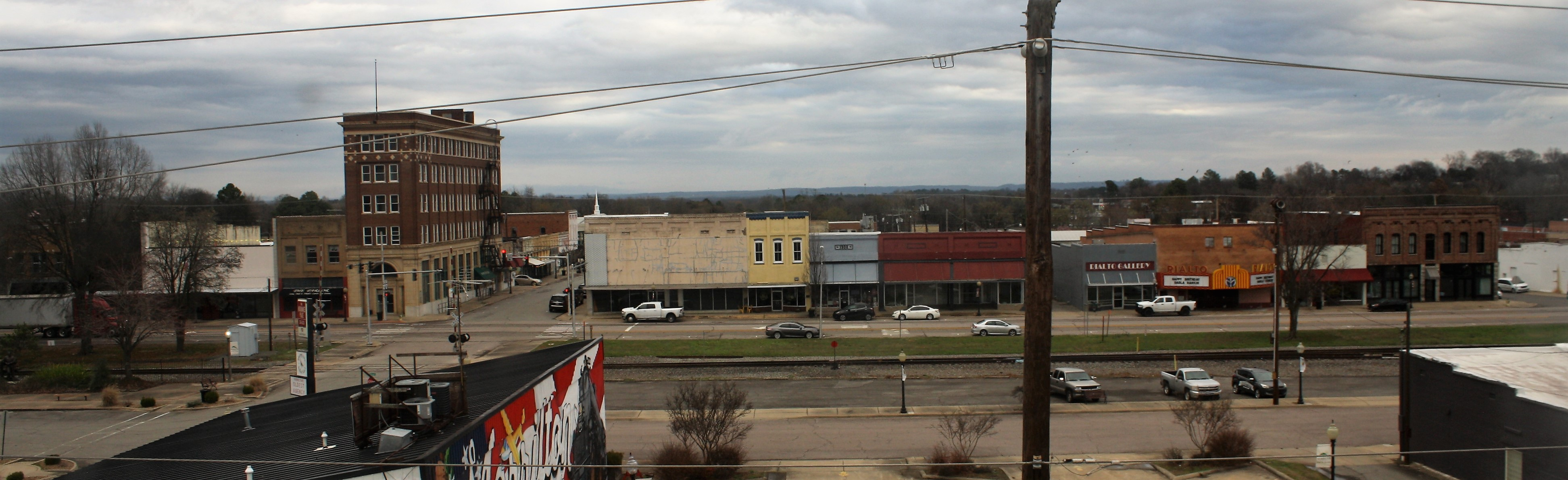
- Clockwise from top: Conway County Courthouse, Conway County Library, Morrilton Commercial Historic District, Morrilton Railroad Station
- Motto: "Small city. No limits."
- Location of Morrilton in Conway County, Arkansas.
- Coordinates: 35°9′23″N 92°44′31″W
- Country: United States
- State: Arkansas
- County: Conway

Government
  - Type: Mayor-Council
  - Mayor: Phil Blaylock (N)
  - Council: Morrilton City Council

Area
  - Total: 8.97 sq mi (23.24 km^{2})
  - Land: 8.83 sq mi (22.86 km^{2})
  - Water: 0.15 sq mi (0.38 km^{2})
- Elevation: 384 ft (117 m)

Population (2020)
  - Total: 6,992
  - Estimate (2025): 7,195 ▲
  - Density: 792.1/sq mi (305.82/km^{2})
- Time zone: UTC−06:00 (Central (CST))
  - Summer (DST): UTC−05:00 (CDT)
- ZIP Code: 72110
- Area code: 501
- FIPS code: 05-46970
- GNIS feature ID: 0056839
- Local airport: Morrilton Municipal Airport (KBDQ)
- Interstate Highways: I-40
- Other major highways: US 64, AR 9, AR 95
- Website: www.cityofmorrilton.com

Morrilton is a city in Conway County, Arkansas, United States, less than 50 miles (80 km) northwest of Little Rock. The city is the county seat of Conway County. The population was 6,992 at the 2020 United States census.

== History ==
In 1825 a trading post was established about a mile south of present-day Morrilton on the Arkansas River. This town, later named Lewisburg, thrived after being incorporated in 1844. In 1871 the Little Rock and Fort Smith Railroad built track through present day Morrilton. It was later named Morrilton after the previous landowners E.J. and George H. Morrill. The downtown grew around the Morrills' land and that owned by James M. Moose. Residents of Lewisburg eventually moved away from the river and to the railroad hub at Morrilton. In 1883 Morrilton became the seat of Conway County, Arkansas.

== Geography ==
Morrilton is located in southern Conway County at 35°9′23″N 92°44′31″W (35.156373, -92.741944). It is bordered on the south by the Arkansas River.

Interstate 40 passes through the northern side of the city, leading southeast 48 miles (77 km) to Little Rock and west 107 miles (172 km) to Fort Smith. U.S. Route 64 (East and West Broadway Street) is the main road through the city center, leading east 6 miles (10 km) to Plumerville and northwest 13 miles (21 km) to Atkins. Arkansas Highway 9 forms an eastern bypass of Morrilton and leads north 40 miles (64 km) to Clinton and south across the Arkansas River 13 miles (21 km) to Perryville.

According to the United States Census Bureau, Morrilton has a total area of 9.2 square miles (23.7 km^{2}), of which 8.7 square miles (22.6 km^{2}) is land and 0.39 square miles (1.0 km^{2}), or 4.29%, is water.

=== Climate ===
The climate in this area is characterized by hot, humid summers and generally mild to cool winters. According to the Köppen Climate Classification system, Morrilton has a humid subtropical climate, abbreviated "Cfa" on climate maps.

Climate data for Morrilton, Arkansas (1991–2020 normals, extremes 1919–present)
Month	Jan	Feb	Mar	Apr	May	Jun	Jul	Aug	Sep	Oct	Nov	Dec	Year
Record high °F (°C)	82 (28)	88 (31)	93 (34)	96 (36)	101 (38)	109 (43)	115 (46)	115 (46)	109 (43)	96 (36)	90 (32)	80 (27)	115 (46)
Mean maximum °F (°C)	70.5 (21.4)	74.4 (23.6)	81.0 (27.2)	85.3 (29.6)	89.9 (32.2)	95.6 (35.3)	99.5 (37.5)	100.7 (38.2)	96.3 (35.7)	89.1 (31.7)	78.8 (26.0)	71.5 (21.9)	101.8 (38.8)
Mean daily maximum °F (°C)	50.0 (10.0)	55.2 (12.9)	63.8 (17.7)	72.9 (22.7)	80.2 (26.8)	88.3 (31.3)	92.5 (33.6)	92.6 (33.7)	85.9 (29.9)	75.1 (23.9)	62.6 (17.0)	52.5 (11.4)	72.6 (22.6)
Daily mean °F (°C)	39.5 (4.2)	43.5 (6.4)	51.7 (10.9)	60.5 (15.8)	69.2 (20.7)	77.8 (25.4)	81.7 (27.6)	80.7 (27.1)	73.5 (23.1)	62.1 (16.7)	50.7 (10.4)	42.0 (5.6)	61.1 (16.2)
Mean daily minimum °F (°C)	29.1 (−1.6)	31.8 (−0.1)	39.5 (4.2)	48.1 (8.9)	58.2 (14.6)	67.3 (19.6)	70.9 (21.6)	68.8 (20.4)	61.0 (16.1)	49.0 (9.4)	38.7 (3.7)	31.4 (−0.3)	49.5 (9.7)
Mean minimum °F (°C)	13.2 (−10.4)	17.3 (−8.2)	23.1 (−4.9)	31.8 (−0.1)	42.1 (5.6)	55.2 (12.9)	61.2 (16.2)	58.8 (14.9)	45.2 (7.3)	32.1 (0.1)	22.6 (−5.2)	16.6 (−8.6)	10.2 (−12.1)
Record low °F (°C)	−7 (−22)	−15 (−26)	9 (−13)	24 (−4)	34 (1)	47 (8)	49 (9)	43 (6)	34 (1)	23 (−5)	12 (−11)	−6 (−21)	−15 (−26)
Average precipitation inches (mm)	3.64 (92)	3.81 (97)	5.06 (129)	5.29 (134)	5.52 (140)	3.56 (90)	3.82 (97)	3.69 (94)	3.30 (84)	3.93 (100)	4.85 (123)	4.73 (120)	51.20 (1,300)
Average snowfall inches (cm)	0.5 (1.3)	0.8 (2.0)	0.7 (1.8)	0.0 (0.0)	0.0 (0.0)	0.0 (0.0)	0.0 (0.0)	0.0 (0.0)	0.0 (0.0)	0.0 (0.0)	0.1 (0.25)	0.3 (0.76)	2.4 (6.1)
Average precipitation days (≥ 0.01 in)	9.0	8.7	10.5	9.4	10.6	8.1	7.8	7.7	6.9	7.9	9.0	9.5	105.1
Average snowy days (≥ 0.1 in)	0.5	0.5	0.2	0.0	0.0	0.0	0.0	0.0	0.0	0.0	0.1	0.2	1.5
Source: NOAA

== Demographics ==
Historical population
Census	Pop.	Note	%±
1880	770		—
1890	1,644		113.5%
1900	1,707		3.8%
1910	2,424		42.0%
1920	3,010		24.2%
1930	4,043		34.3%
1940	4,608		14.0%
1950	5,483		19.0%
1960	5,997		9.4%
1970	6,814		13.6%
1980	7,355		7.9%
1990	6,551		−10.9%
2000	6,550		0.0%
2010	6,767		3.3%
2020	6,992		3.3%
2025 (est.)	7,195	▲	2.9%
U.S. Decennial Census

=== 2020 census ===
As of the 2020 census, Morrilton had a population of 6,992. The median age was 37.1 years. 24.8% of residents were under the age of 18 and 16.9% of residents were 65 years of age or older. For every 100 females there were 87.6 males, and for every 100 females age 18 and over there were 83.5 males age 18 and over.

90.1% of residents lived in urban areas, while 9.9% lived in rural areas.

There were 2,810 households, including 1,755 families, in Morrilton. Of all households, 31.9% had children under the age of 18 living in them, 36.9% were married-couple households, 18.4% were households with a male householder and no spouse or partner present, and 37.9% were households with a female householder and no spouse or partner present. About 33.6% of all households were made up of individuals and 14.4% had someone living alone who was 65 years of age or older.

There were 3,241 housing units, of which 13.3% were vacant. The homeowner vacancy rate was 3.1% and the rental vacancy rate was 10.9%.

Morrilton racial composition
Race	Number	Percentage
White (non-Hispanic)	4,775	68.29%
Black or African American (non-Hispanic)	1,185	16.95%
Native American	46	0.66%
Asian	41	0.59%
Pacific Islander	3	0.04%
Other/Mixed	505	7.22%
Hispanic or Latino	437	6.25%

=== 2010 census ===
As of the 2010 Census, 6,767 people and 2,759 households resided within the city.

=== 2000 census ===
2000 Census results showed 1,724 families residing in the city. The population density was 796.7 inhabitants per square mile (307.6/km^{2}). There were 2,947 housing units at an average density of 358.4 per square mile (138.4/km^{2}). The racial makeup of the city was 78.38% White, 17.47% Black or African American, 0.79% Native American, 0.34% Asian, 0.02% Pacific Islander, 1.37% from other races, and 1.63% from two or more races. 3.37% of the population were Hispanic or Latino of any race.

There were 2,645 households, out of which 30.1% had children under the age of 18 living with them, 46.2% were married couples living together, 15.8% had a female householder with no husband present, and 34.8% were non-families. 32.2% of all households were made up of individuals, and 16.3% had someone living alone who was 65 years of age or older. The average household size was 2.35 and the average family size was 2.94.

In the city, the population was spread out, with 25.4% under the age of 18, 8.7% from 18 to 24, 26.0% from 25 to 44, 20.2% from 45 to 64, and 19.7% who were 65 years of age or older. The median age was 38 years. For every 100 females, there were 84.1 males. For every 100 females age 18 and over, there were 79.5 males.

The median income for a household in the city was $28,007, and the median income for a family was $36,432. Males had a median income of $30,123 versus $19,213 for females. The per capita income for the city was $16,957. About 13.4% of families and 17.1% of the population were below the poverty line, including 21.6% of those under age 18 and 12.8% of those age 65 or over.

== Arts and culture ==
Many sites located in Morrilton are on the National Register of Historical Places, including:

- Arkansas Christian College Administration Building – A former school building at 100 W Harding Street.
- Aycock House - A historic house located at 410 West Church Street.
- Coca-Cola Building - A historic commercial building at 211 North Moose Street.
- Conway County Courthouse - Historic courthouse located at the corner of Moose and Church Streets in downtown.
- Conway County Library - Classical Revival brick building library designed by Thomas Harding and funded in part by a grant from Andrew Carnegie.
- Earl Building - A historic commercial building at 201 North St. Joseph Street.
- First National Bank of Morrilton - A historic commercial building at Broadway and Moose Streets.
- Moose Addition Neighborhood Historic District - Oldest residential area in Morrilton.
- Moose House - A historic house at 711 Green Street.
- Morrilton Commercial Historic District - The historic central business district.
- Morrilton Post Office - Historic post office building at 117 North Division Street.
- Morrilton Railroad Station - Historic station on Railroad Ave.
- Saint Anthony's Hospital - Historic hospital building at 202 East Green Street.
- West Church Street Historic District - A collection of the finest late-19th and early-20th century homes.
- W. L. Wood House - A historic house at 709 North Morrill Street.

=== Museums ===
- The Morrilton Depot Museum is located in the historic Morrilton Railroad Station and features history on the area. Adjoining the museum is a statue of the late lieutenant governor Winthrop Paul "Win" Rockefeller and the outdoor space is being developed as "Rockefeller Plaza" to honor the lieutenant governor and his father, Winthrop P. Rockefeller, the former governor of Arkansas.
- The Museum of Automobiles is located on nearby Petit Jean Mountain and features a collection of antique and classic cars, motorcycles, guns, license plates, arcade machines and automobile memorabilia.

=== Outdoor recreation ===
- Petit Jean State Park is a 3,471-acre (1,405 ha) park near Morrilton and is managed by the Arkansas Department of Parks and Tourism. It is located atop Petit Jean Mountain adjacent to the Arkansas River in the area between the Ouachita Mountains and Ozark Plateaus. The park's many hiking trails, historic sites and natural features were the inspiration for the Arkansas State Parks system and continue to draw many visitors to the area. In 2023, the state park was voted as the Best State Park for RVing/Camping.

=== Theatre ===
- The Rialto Theatre in Downtown Morrilton has been in operation for over 100 years. It served as a movie house from 1911 until it was closed by United Artists in 1987. In 1995 the city acquired the building and a group of volunteers restored the theatre. It currently serves as a public arts facility hosting plays, concerts, public meetings, private events, and other happenings.
- H.B. White Auditorium is on the campus of Morrilton High School. It serves as the main auditorium for the school district and hosts public events.
- UACCM Fine Arts Auditorium is on the campus of the University of Arkansas Community College at Morrilton. It serves as the main auditorium for the college and hosts public events.

== Government ==
The city has operated under the mayor-council form of government since it was founded. The city currently elects 11 positions: mayor, city clerk, city attorney, and eight council member positions. The eight council members are represented by two members from each of the city's four wards. The council members are Ward 1: Greg Wiedower, Benny Baker. Ward 2: Gary Koch, Isaac Decker. Ward 3: Richard Deluca, Aaron Spivey. Ward 4: Jim Bowles, Kyle Roch. The current mayor is Phil Blaylock. The city employs over 100 individuals in nine different departments.

Most Conway County government offices are located in the city of Morrilton, including the quorum, circuit, district, and juvenile courts; and the assessor, county judge, county coroner, county attorney, and public defenders offices.

== Education ==
=== Public schools ===
The community's public school system is operated by the South Conway County School District. As of 2018, the district consists of five schools. The SCCSD public high school is Morrilton High School.

Morrilton's first public school for white students opened in 1881. 14 years later the first school for African-American students opened in 1895. In 1980 the East Side, Morrilton, and Plumerville School districts consolidated to form the new South Conway County district.

=== Private schools ===
Sacred Heart Catholic School is the only private school in the city of Morrilton and was established in 1879. It is one of only two private Roman Catholic schools in Arkansas that serves PreK-12.

=== Colleges and universities ===
Morrilton is home to the University of Arkansas Community College at Morrilton.

The city was home to Harding College, now Harding University of Searcy, Arkansas, for about a decade in the 1920s and 1930s. The original campus of Harding University is now the Southern Christian Home, a church-supported residential child care facility.

=== Public libraries ===
The Conway County Library is located at 101 West Church Street in Downtown Morrilton. The library was established in 1897 by the Pathfinder Club. It moved among members homes until 1916 when the Andrew Carnegie Foundation awarded the club a grant for a building. The Conway County Library is one of two public libraries in the state of Arkansas functioning from its original Carnegie building.

== Notable people ==
- Gordon Anderson, sculptor and widower of screen star Sondra Locke
- Carl B. Close (1907–1980), Louisiana state representative, a Democrat, who also served as mayor of Alexandria from 1947 to 1953, was born at Robertsville near Morrilton, the son of the country physician, Edgar Close.
- Nathan Green Gordon (1916–2008), sixth lieutenant governor of Arkansas and distinguished United States Navy aviator during World War II; born in Morrilton
- William L. Moose, politician, judge, and Attorney General of Arkansas
- James S. Moose, Jr. (1903–1989) First US Government representative to live in Saudi Arabia, ambassador to Syria and the Sudan
- Winthrop Rockefeller (1912–1973), governor of Arkansas from 1967 to 1971; lived at Petit Jean Mountain near Morrilton
- John R. Stallings (1935–2008), mathematician known for his seminal contributions to geometric group theory and 3-manifold topology; born in Morrilton
- Shekinna Stricklen - Women's basketball player that graduated from Morrilton High School. Played collegiately for the University of Tennessee. She was selected in the first round of the 2012 WNBA draft (2nd overall) by the Seattle Storm. Won the 2019 WNBA Three Point Contest the day before the 2019 WNBA All-Star Game.
- C. Vann Woodward (1908–1999), American historian focused primarily on the Southern United States and its individual sociology of race and ethnic relations. He attended Morrilton High School.

== Media ==
=== Print ===
The Petit Jean Country Headlight is the largest newspaper in the city. It was established April 8, 1874, in Lewisburg before moving to Morrilton. It currently serves as a weekly newspaper and publishes on Wednesdays.

=== Radio ===
KVOM (AM) first began airing on Christmas Day 1952 and was started by J.C. Willis. KVOM-FM began broadcasting on 101.7 MHz FM in 1979.

=== Television ===
Morrilton Community Channel 6 started on the local cable system during the 1990s. It currently broadcasts local events on channel 6 and their website.
