= Moose (surname) =

Moose is a surname. Notable people with the surname include:

- Bob Moose (1947–1976), American Major League Baseball pitcher
- Charles Moose (1953–2021), Chief of Police in Montgomery County, Maryland, at the time of the Beltway sniper attacks in October 2002
- George Moose (born 1944), American diplomat
- James S. Moose, Jr. (1903–1989), American diplomat
- Justin Moose (born 1983), American soccer player
- Richard M. Moose (1932–2015), American government official
- Rob Moose (born 1982), American musician
