= West Church Street Historic District =

Historic district in Arkansas, United States

- U.S. National Register of Historic Places
- U.S. Historic district
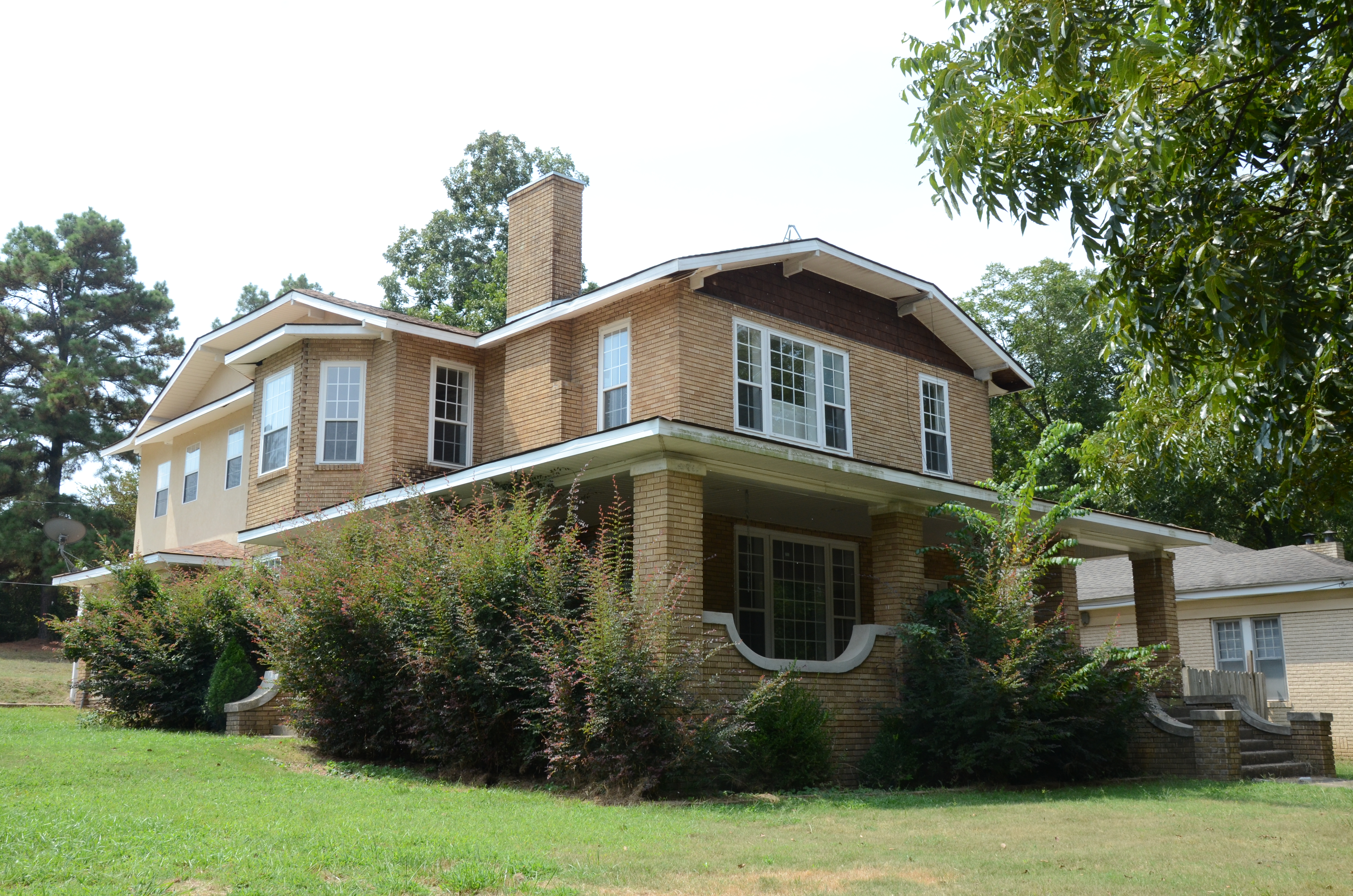

- Location within Arkansas Location within the United States
- Location: Roughly bounded by S. Morrill, Valley, S. Cherokee & W. Church Sts., Morrilton, Arkansas
- Coordinates: 35°9′4″N 92°44′54″W
- Area: 18 acres (7.3 ha)
- Architectural style: Gothic Revival, Colonial Revival, Spanish Revival, Craftsman
- NRHP reference No.: 15000259
- Added to NRHP: May 25, 2015

The West Church Street Historic District encompasses a collection of the finest late-19th and early-20th century homes in Morrilton, Arkansas. The district extends along West Church Street between South Morrill and South Cherokee Streets, and includes 23 primary buildings. All are houses, and include buildings from the earliest days of the city (c. 1878) through the 1920s. The majority of the district's houses were built between 1926 and 1942, and are mainly Craftsman in style.

The district was listed on the National Register of Historic Places in 2015.

== See also ==
- National Register of Historic Places listings in Conway County, Arkansas
