= Morrilton Municipal Airport =

Airport in Arkansas, United States

- IATA: none; ICAO: KBDQ; FAA LID: BDQ

Summary
- Airport type: Public
- Owner: City of Morrilton
- Serves: Morrilton, Arkansas
- Elevation AMSL: 321 ft (98 m)
- Coordinates: 35°08′10″N 092°42′49″W

Map
- Location of airport in Arkansas BDQ (the United States)

Runways
Direction	Length		Surface
Direction	ft	m	Surface
9/27	4,000	1,219	Asphalt

Statistics (2009)
- Aircraft operations: 7,050
- Based aircraft: 43
- Source: Federal Aviation Administration

Morrilton Municipal Airport (ICAO: KBDQ, FAA LID: BDQ) is a public use airport located two nautical miles (4 km) southeast of the central business district of Morrilton, in Conway County, Arkansas, United States. It is owned by the City of Morrilton.

This airport is included in the FAA's National Plan of Integrated Airport Systems for 2011–2015, which categorized it as a general aviation airport.

Although most U.S. airports use the same three-letter location identifier for the FAA and IATA, this airport is assigned BDQ by the FAA but has no designation from the IATA (which assigned BDQ to Vadodara Airport in India).

== Facilities and aircraft ==
Morrilton Municipal Airport covers an area of 125 acres (51 ha) at an elevation of 321 feet (98 m) above mean sea level. It has one runway designated 9/27 with an asphalt surface measuring 4,000 by 75 feet (1,219 x 23 m).

For the 12-month period ending May 31, 2009, the airport had 7,050 aircraft operations, an average of 19 per day: 93% general aviation and 7% military. At that time there were 43 aircraft based at this airport: 79% single-engine, 5% multi-engine, 12% helicopter and 5% ultralight.

== See also ==
- List of airports in Arkansas
