= Moose House =

Historic house in Arkansas, United States

- U.S. National Register of Historic Places
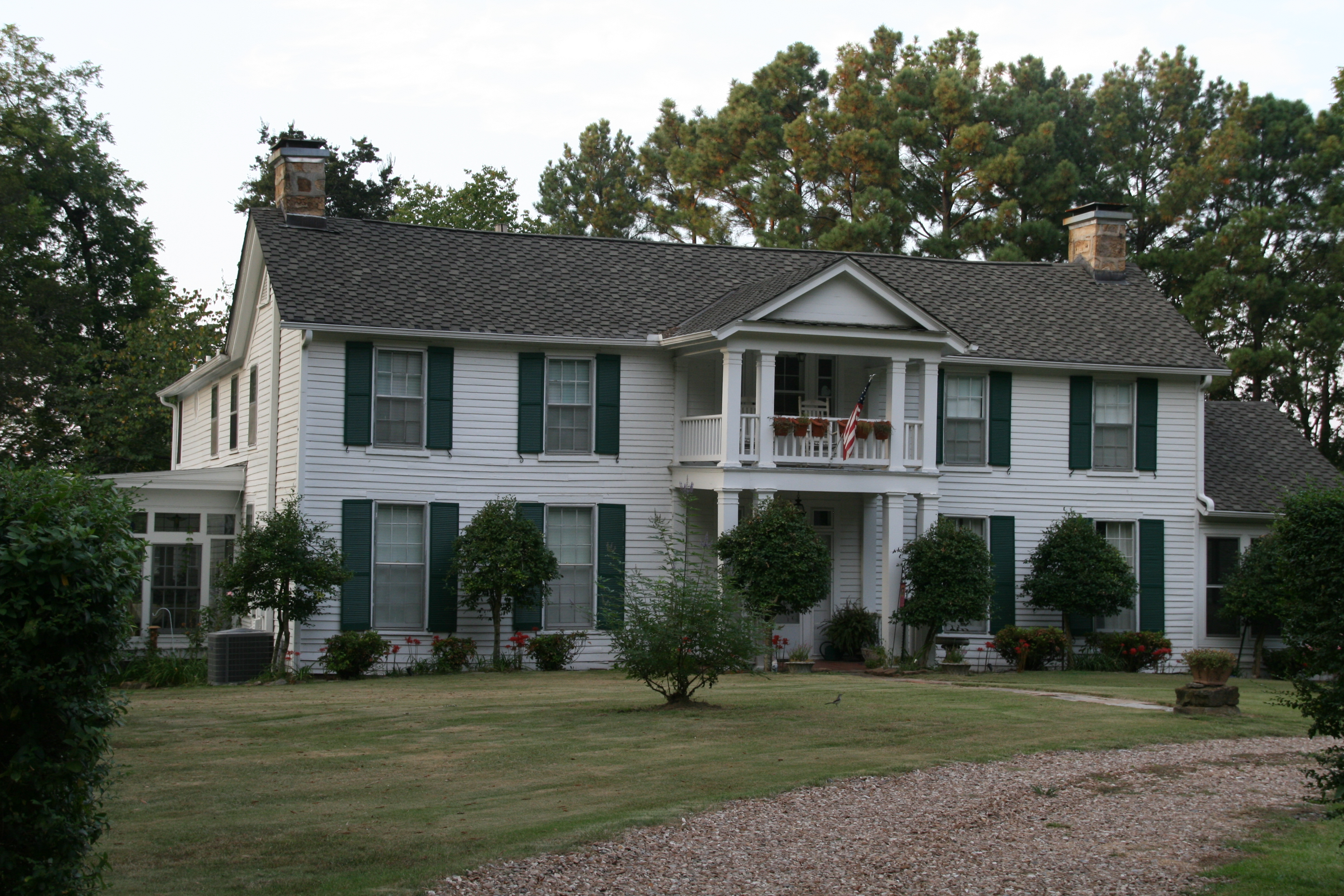

- Location within Arkansas Location within the United States
- Location: 711 Green St., Morrilton, Arkansas
- Coordinates: 35°8′56″N 92°44′15″W
- Area: less than one acre
- NRHP reference No.: 74000472
- Added to NRHP: October 22, 1974

The Moose House is a historic house at 711 Green Street in Morrilton, Arkansas. A 2½-story wood-frame structure with a gabled roof and weatherboard siding, it has a gabled porch that projects from the center bay supported by paired square columns. The house was built around 1832 in Lewisburg on the Arkansas river and known as the Markham Tavern. It was moved to its current location after the Civil War by James Miles Moose, one of the two founders (along with Edward Morrill) of Morrilton.

The area where the house was built was farmland until the 1880s, when the railroad arrived in the area, prompting the two men to lobby for a railroad station, around which the town grew.

The house was listed on the National Register of Historic Places in 1974.

== See also ==
- National Register of Historic Places listings in Conway County, Arkansas
