= Moose Addition Neighborhood Historic District =

Historic district in Arkansas, United States

- U.S. National Register of Historic Places
- U.S. Historic district
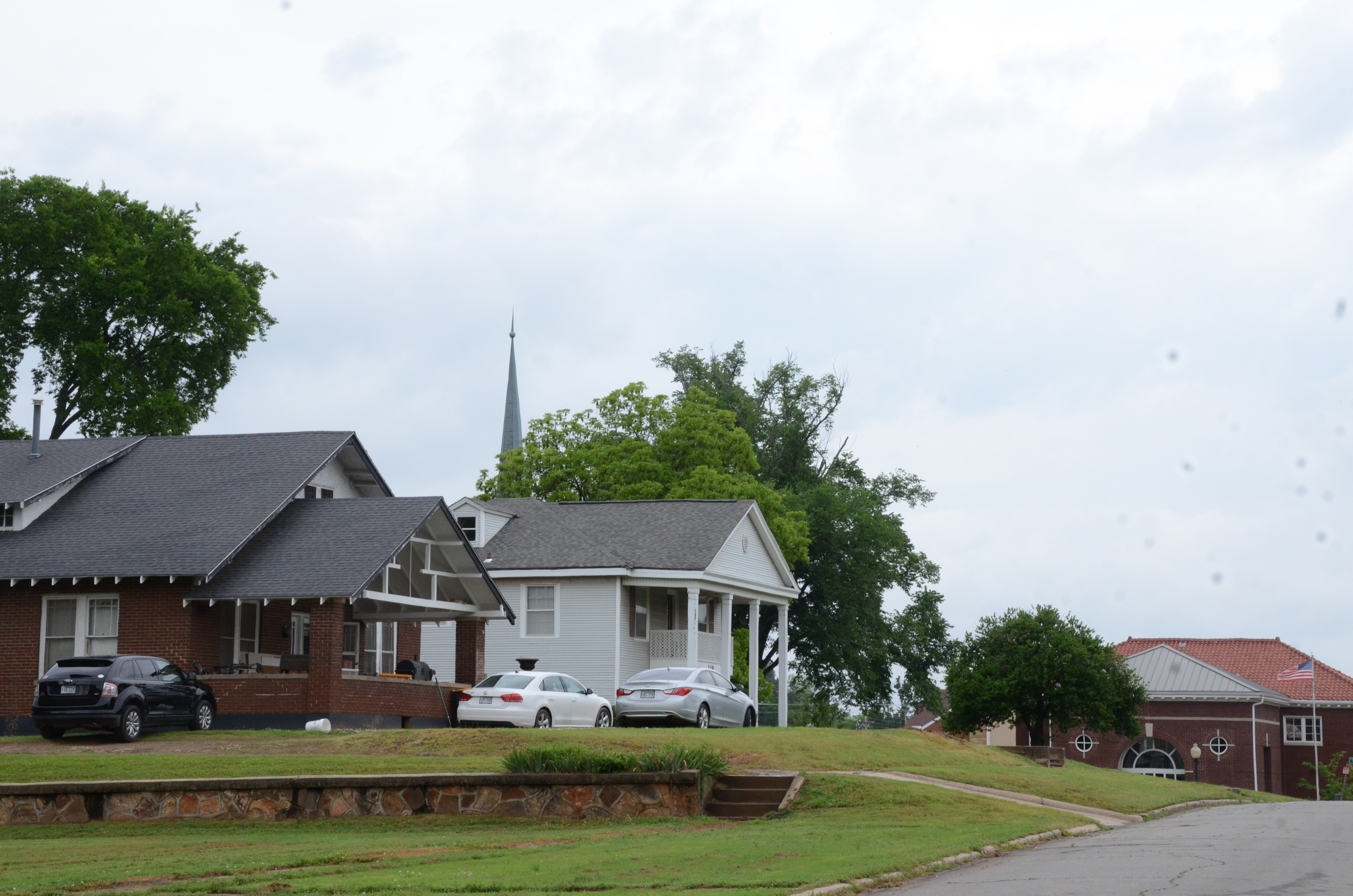

- Location within Arkansas Location within the United States
- Location: Roughly bounded by W. Valley, S. Moose, Green, Brown & S. Division Sts.; also roughly bounded by S. St. Joseph, E. Green, S. Chestnut, E. Valley, S. Morrill & E. Church Sts., Morrilton, Arkansas
- Coordinates: 35°8′59″N 92°44′49″W
- Area: 130 acres (53 ha)
- NRHP reference No.: 13000349 (original); 15000258 (increase)

Significant dates
- Added to NRHP: September 13, 2013
- Boundary increase: May 26, 2015

The Moose Addition Neighborhood Historic District encompasses the oldest residential area of Morrilton, Arkansas. This area was farmland until the railroad was built through the region in the 1880s. Located just south of the railroad and the city's business district, this area was soon built up as a residential area, with most of its development coming between roughly 1925 and 1960. There is a single Queen Anne Victorian, built in 1881, from the earliest days of its development.

The district was listed on the National Register of Historic Places in 2013 and enlarged in 2015. Its initial listing included properties on Division Street and Moose Street between Valley Street in the north and Brown and Green Streets to the south. It was nearly doubled in size in 2015, expanding north to Church Street and east to St. Joseph Street.

== See also ==
- National Register of Historic Places listings in Conway County, Arkansas
