= Arkansas Highway 10 =

State highway in Arkansas, United States

Highway 10

Route information
- Maintained by ArDOT
- Length: 135.4 mi (217.9 km)
- Existed: 1926–present

Major junctions
- West end: SH-120 at the Oklahoma state line in Hackett
- US 71 in Greenwood; AR 7 / AR 28 in Ola; AR 9 from Perry to Williams Junction; I-430 in Little Rock
- East end: I-30 / US 65 / US 67 / US 167 in Little Rock

Location
- Country: United States
- State: Arkansas
- Counties: Sebastian, Logan, Yell, Perry, Pulaski

Highway system
- Arkansas Highway System; Interstate; US; State; Business; Spurs; Suffixed; Scenic; Heritage
← AR 9	→ AR 11

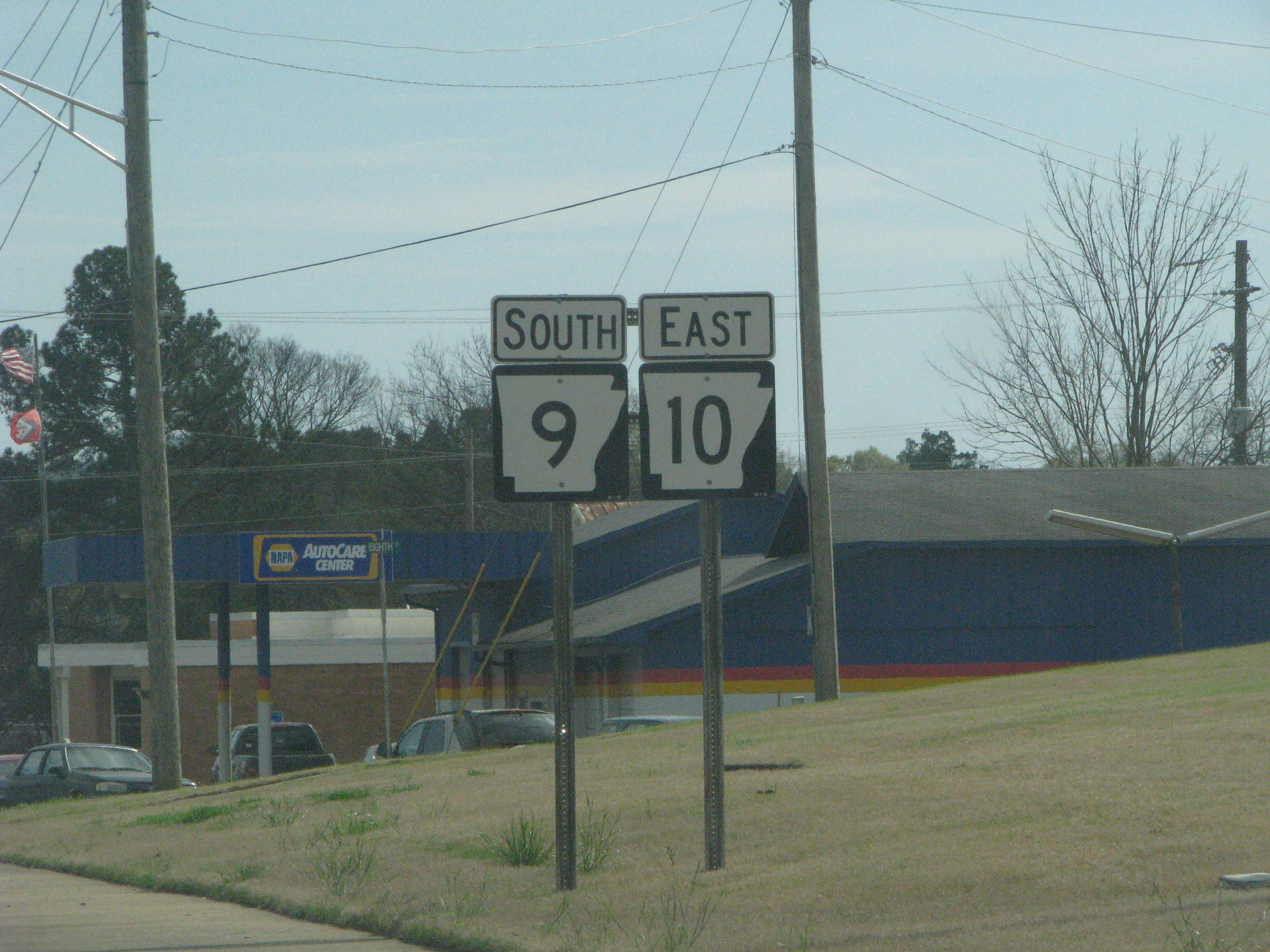
Highways 9 and 10 are concurrent through Perryville

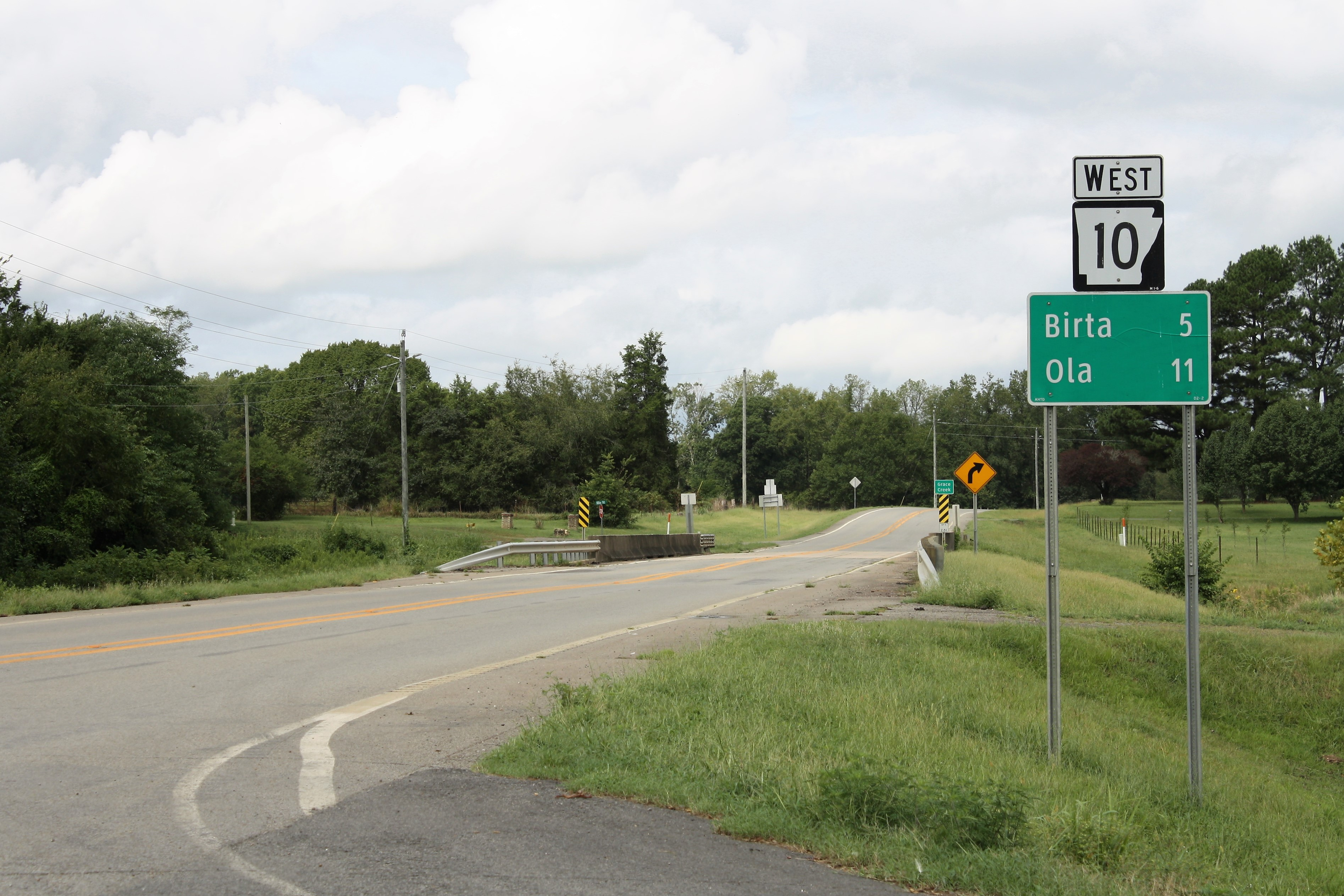
Highway 10 in Casa, Arkansas looking west.

Arkansas Highway 10 (AR 10) is an east–west state highway in western Arkansas. The route runs 135.4 miles (217.9 km) from the Oklahoma state line east to Interstate 30 (I-30) in Little Rock, the state's capital. The highway serves both the Fort Smith metropolitan area and the Little Rock – North Little Rock – Conway metropolitan area.

Aside from Little Rock in Pulaski County, the highway also passes through county seats in four other Arkansas counties — Greenwood, Sebastian County; Booneville, Logan County; Danville, Yell County; and Perryville, Perry County. Mount Magazine, Arkansas's highest point, lies just to the north of the highway, as does the adjoining Mount Magazine State Park. Highway 10 also passes through a portion of the Ozark National Forest and parallel to the Petit Jean River, Petit Jean Wildlife Management Area and Lake Maumelle — a chief source of water for residents in the Little Rock metropolitan area.

== Route description ==
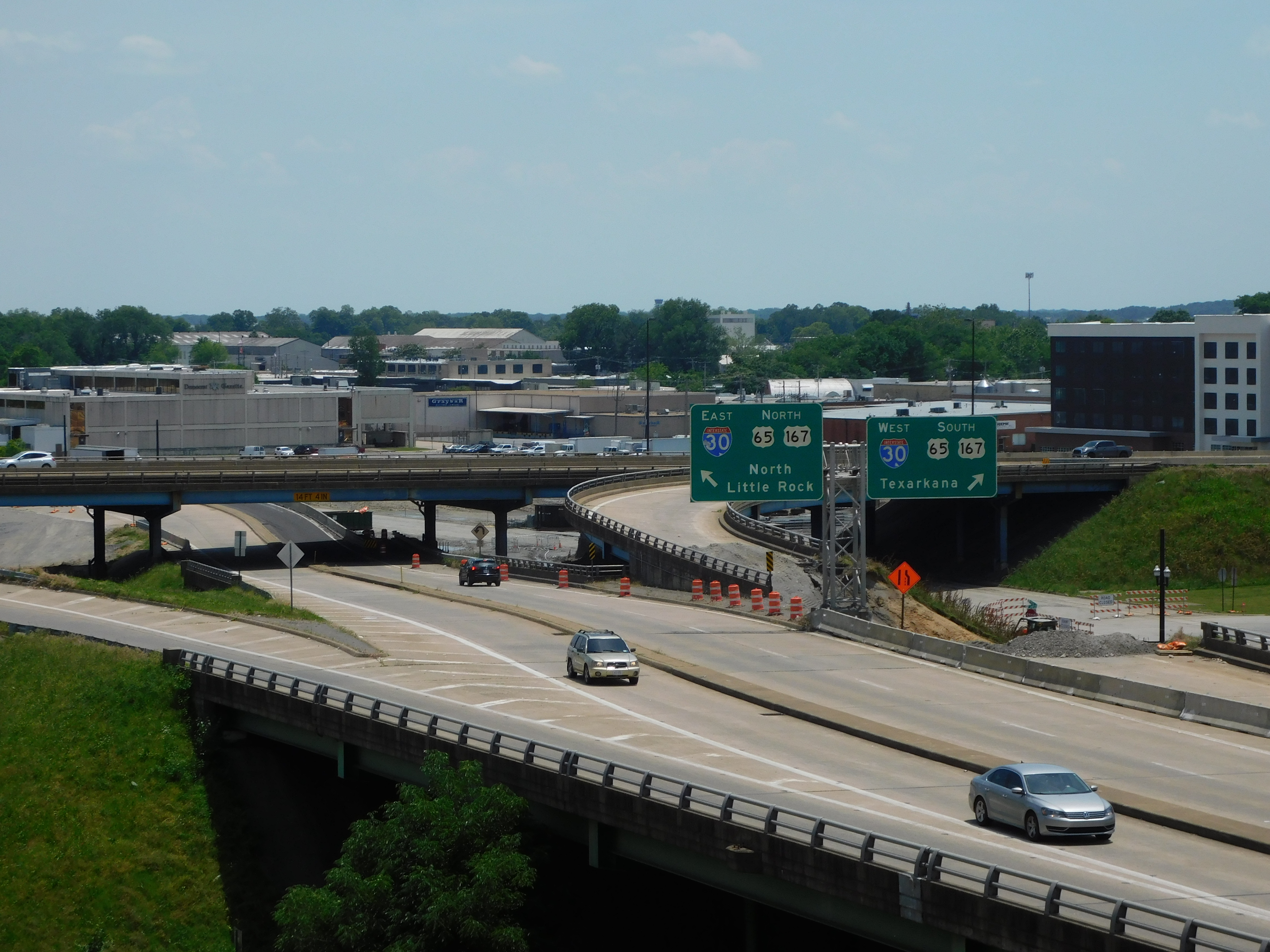
Former eastern terminus of Highway 10 at an interchange with I-30 in Downtown Little Rock

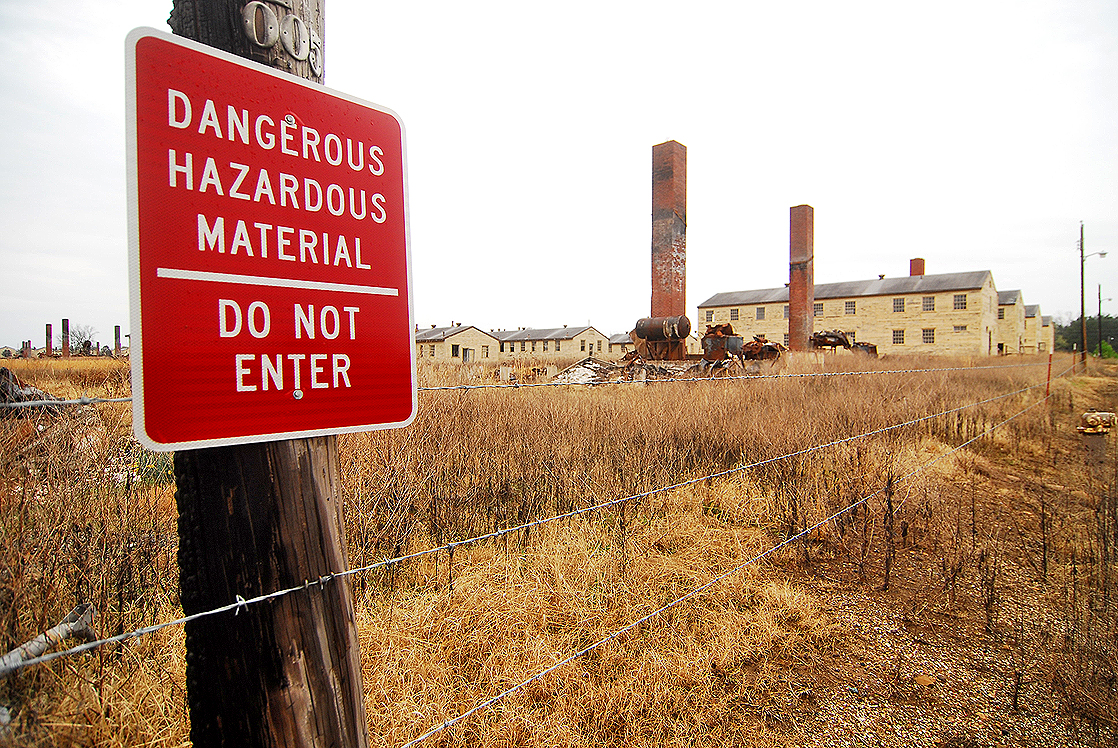
Fort Chaffee serves as a training facility for National Guard and Army Reserve units.

The route begins at the Oklahoma state line as a continuation of OK-120 and runs east to Hackett. Highway 10 intersects Highway 45 in Hackett, and continues east to Greenwood. Highway 10 passes through downtown Greenwood, passing Highway 10S and the Old Sebastian County Jail, which is listed on the National Register of Historic Places. The highway leaves town and passes Fort Chaffee on its way to Logan County. In Booneville, the route intersects the scenic Highway 23 near the Bank of Booneville Building and Farmers and Merchants Bank-Masonic Lodge. Highway 10 also passes the Booneville Municipal Airport before entering Magazine. The highway passes by the historic Magazine City Hall-Jail and intersects Highway 109 in Magazine before entering Yell County.

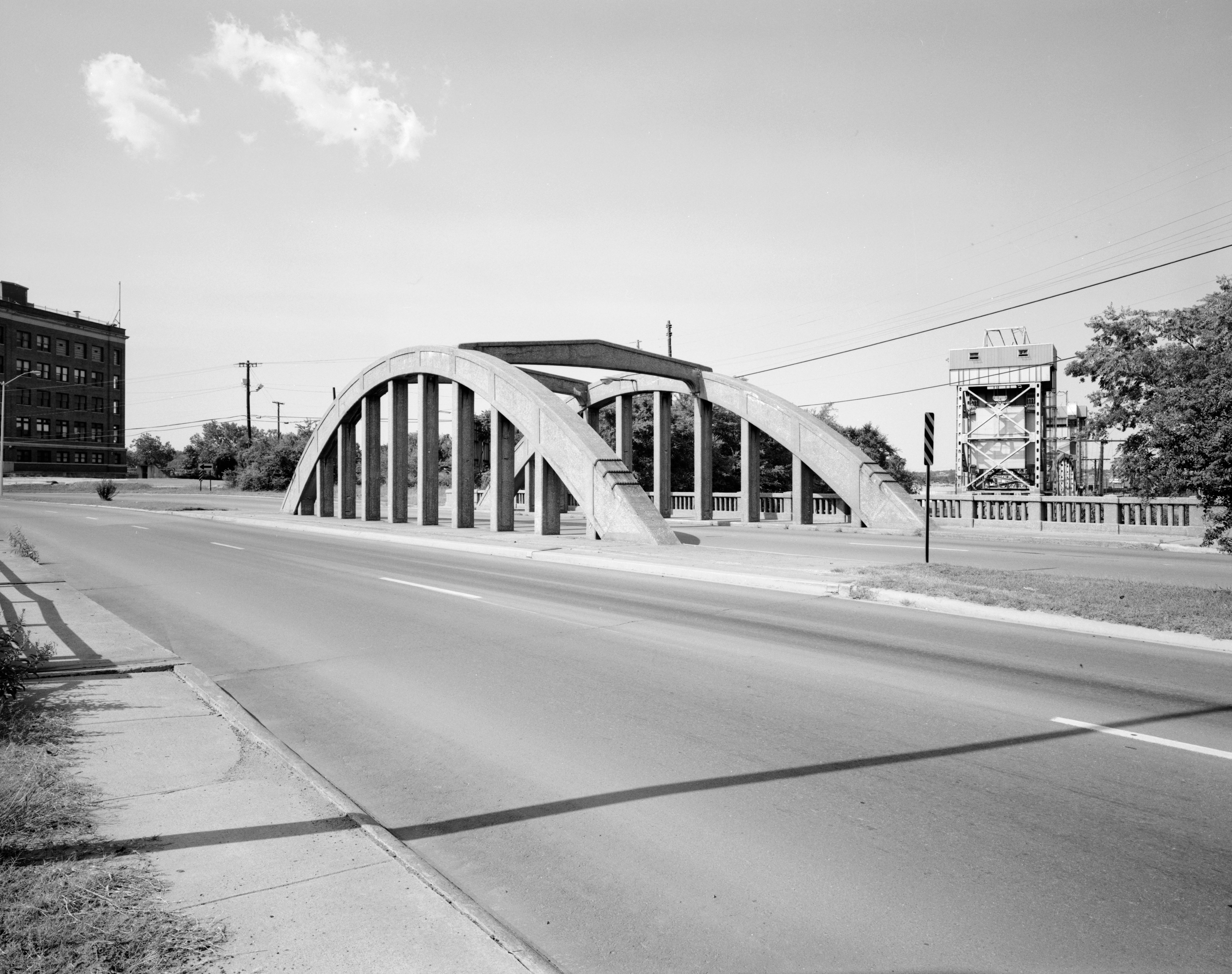
Highway 10 runs on this bridge over the Union Pacific Railroad in Little Rock. It was built in 1928.

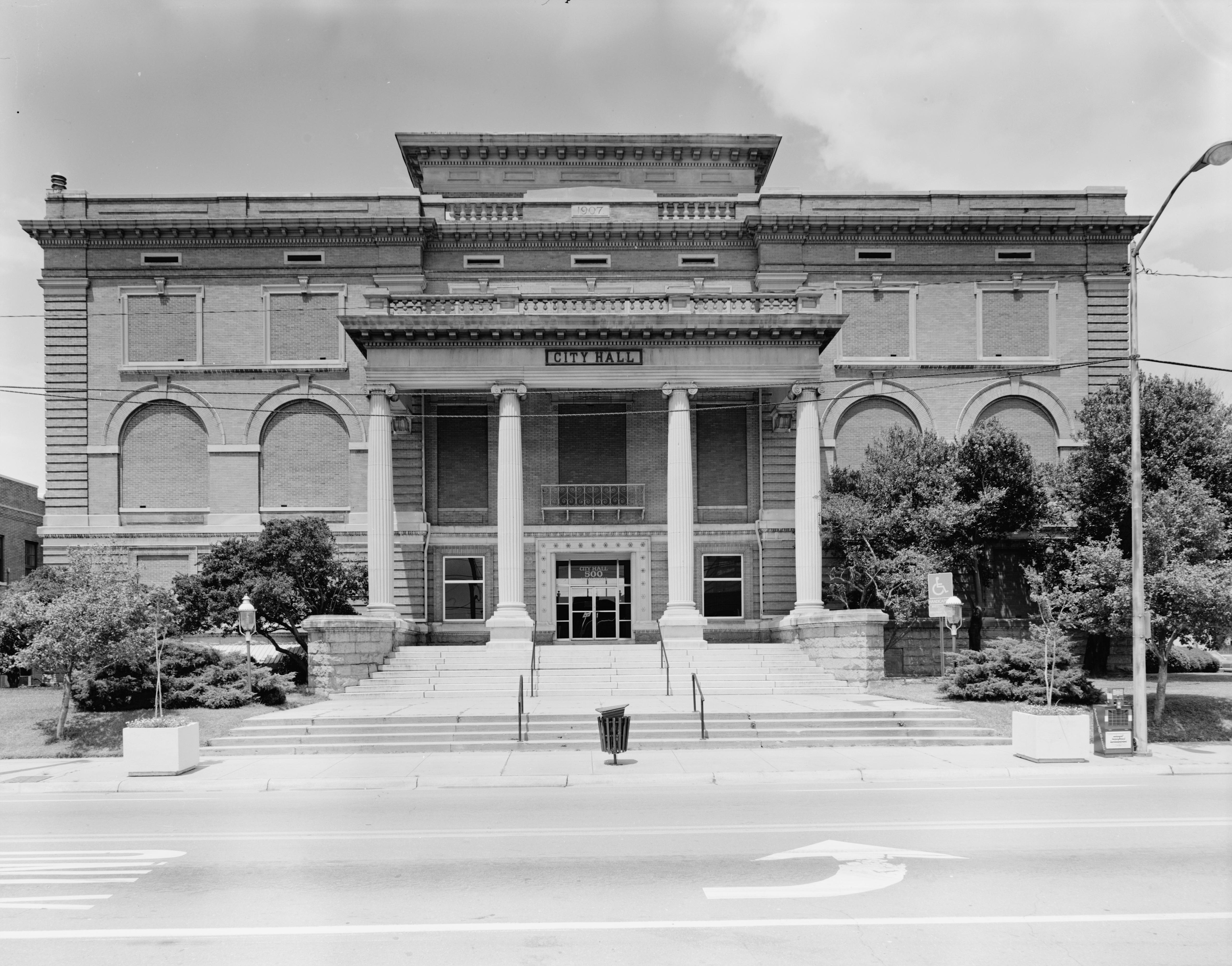
Highway 10 runs near the historic Little Rock City Hall.

Highway 10 begins to cover mountainous terrain, passing Havana, Belleville, and the Danville Municipal Airport. Highway 10 intersects Highway 27 in Danville and Highway 7/Highway 28 in Ola. In Perry County, Highway 10 continues through mountainous terrain and small towns Cass and Adona before forming a southerly concurrency with Highway 9 in Perry. Highway 9/Highway 10 run together pass Lake Harris Brake on to Perryville, past the Perry County Courthouse and south to Williams Junction, where Highway 10 turns east to Little Rock.

Highway 10 enters Pulaski County, passing Lake Maumelle and Pinnacle Mountain State Park before entering the city, becoming Cantrell Road. The far western portions of Cantrell Road in recent years have been the site for increased commercial development in Little Rock, including the controversial 2004 opening of a Wal-Mart Supercenter near upscale residential communities immediately south of the highway in Chenal Valley. In the portion between I-430 in the west and downtown in the east, Cantrell Road is a primary traffic artery for northern Little Rock, including the upper part of the Pulaski Heights section of the city, and is one of the most traveled thoroughfares aside from the Interstates in Little Rock. Cantrell Road runs with neighborhoods to the south and parks to the north, passing Arkansas Baptist High School.

The highway intersects I-430 at a Parclo interchange and runs deeper into downtown Little Rock, passing numerous houses on the National Register of Historic Places. Cantrell Road continues past the Jackson Reservoir near the Cammack Village area, crossing University Avenue. Highway 10 becomes La Harpe Boulevard and proceeds east past the Arkansas State Capitol along the Arkansas River, before passing underneath Broadway Street (US 70). The route uses one block of Cumberland Street, then becomes unsigned and turns east onto 2nd Street before terminating at exit 140 on I-30 near The Tavern and William J. Clinton Presidential Library.

=== Greenwood spur ===
Highway 10S
- Location: Greenwood
- Length: 3.07 mi (4.94 km)
- Existed: Mid-1960–present

Arkansas Highway 10 Spur is a spur route of 3.07 miles (4.94 km) in Sebastian County. Its western terminus is at US 71, just west of Greenwood, while its eastern terminus is at Highway 10 near downtown Greenwood. Until the mid-1960s, this road was part of the original alignment of US 71.

== History ==
Arkansas Highway 10 was one of the original 1926 state highways.

Highway 10 was one of the original 1926 Arkansas State Highways, and remains very close to that routing today. The highway roughly parallels US 64 and I-40 for its entire length, both approximately 20 miles (32 km) to Highway 10's north until their convergence in Little Rock. Even in 1926, however, US 64 was constructed to higher standards than Highway 10, making US 64 always the more feasible route for travelers from Fort Smith to the state capitol. Highway 10 remains the "scenic path" from Fort Smith, passing through the Ouachita Mountains at a slower pace than the bustling four-lane freeway.

== Major intersections ==
Mile markers reset at some concurrencies.

County	Location	mi	km	Destinations	Notes
Sebastian		0.0	0.0	SH-120 west	Continuation into Oklahoma
Sebastian	Hackett	1.4	2.3	AR 45 south – Hartford	Western end of AR 45 concurrency
Sebastian	Hackett	1.8	2.9	AR 45 north – Fort Smith	Eastern end of AR 45 concurrency
Sebastian	Excelsior	7.3	11.7	AR 253 south – Midland	Northern terminus of AR 253
Sebastian		9.0	14.5	US 71 – Fort Smith, Mena	
Sebastian	Greenwood			I-49 – Fort Smith, Texarkana	Proposed; future exit 183 on I-49
Sebastian	Greenwood	11.1	17.9	AR 10S west – Fort Smith	Eastern terminus of AR 10S; former US 71
Sebastian	Greenwood	12.2	19.6	AR 96 east to AR 22	Western terminus of AR 96
Sebastian		21.2	34.1	AR 252 west – Washburn, Milltown	Eastern terminus of AR 252
Logan		28.6	46.0	AR 60 west	Eastern terminus of AR 60
Logan	Booneville	32.2	51.8	AR 23 (North Broadway Avenue)	
Logan		34.6	55.7	AR 197 south (Ralph Rudolph Drive)	Northern terminus of AR 197
Logan		34.9	56.2	AR 116 west	Eastern terminus of AR 116
Logan	Magazine	39.0	62.8	AR 109 north (North Garland Street)	Western end of AR 109 concurrency
Logan	Magazine	39.1	62.9	AR 109 south (South Reveille Street)	Eastern end of AR 109 concurrency
Yell	Waveland	49.5	79.7	AR 309 south – Blue Mountain Dam	Northern terminus of AR 309
Yell	Havana	55.8	89.8	AR 309 north (Main Street) – Mount Magazine, Mount Magazine State Park	Southern terminus of AR 309
Yell	Belleville	60.6	97.5	AR 307 north (North Main Street)	Southern terminus of AR 307
Yell	Danville	64.2	103.3	AR 27 north – Dardanelle	Southern terminus of AR 27
Yell	Danville	65.0	104.6	AR 27 south – Mount Ida	Northern terminus of AR 27
Yell	Ola	76.1	122.5	AR 7 north (North 4th Street) – Russellville, Dardanelle	Western end of AR 7 concurrency
Yell	Ola	0.0	0.0	AR 7 south / AR 28 west – Nimrod Dam, Hot Springs, Plainview	Eastern end of AR 7 concurrency
Perry		9.6	15.4	AR 155 north – Petit Jean	Southern terminus of AR 155
Perry		17.0	27.4	AR 324 north to AR 155	Southern terminus of AR 324
Perry	Perry	25.3	40.7	AR 9 north to AR 154 – Morrilton, Petit Jean State Park	Western end of AR 9 concurrency
Perry	Perryville			AR 60 east – Houston, Conway	Western end of AR 60 concurrency
Perry	Perryville			AR 60 west – Nimrod Lake	Eastern end of AR 60 concurrency
Perry				AR 300 east – Harris Brake State Wildlife Management Area, Pleasant Valley	Western terminus of AR 300
Perry				AR 216 east – Pleasant Valley	Western terminus of AR 216
Perry				AR 324 west – Lake Sylvia	Eastern terminus of AR 324
Perry	Williams Junction	0.0	0.0	AR 9 south – Paron	Eastern end of AR 9 concurrency
Pulaski		7.2	11.6	AR 113 north – Bigelow, Wye Mountain	Southern terminus of AR 113
Pulaski	Little Rock	18.8	30.3	AR 300 west – Roland, Pinnacle Mountain State Park	Eastern terminus of AR 300
Pulaski	Little Rock	25.3	40.7	I-430 / Rodney Parham Road / River Mountain Road to Southridge Drive – Memphis, Fort Smith	Interchange; Southridge Drive not signed westbound; exit 9 on I-430
Pulaski	Little Rock			To I-30 west (US 65 south / US 67 south / US 167 south)	Access via Cumberland Street
Pulaski	Little Rock	34.0	54.7	I-30 east (US 65 north / US 67 north / US 167 north) – North Little Rock	Unsigned eastern terminus; exit 140 on I-30
1.000 mi = 1.609 km; 1.000 km = 0.621 mi

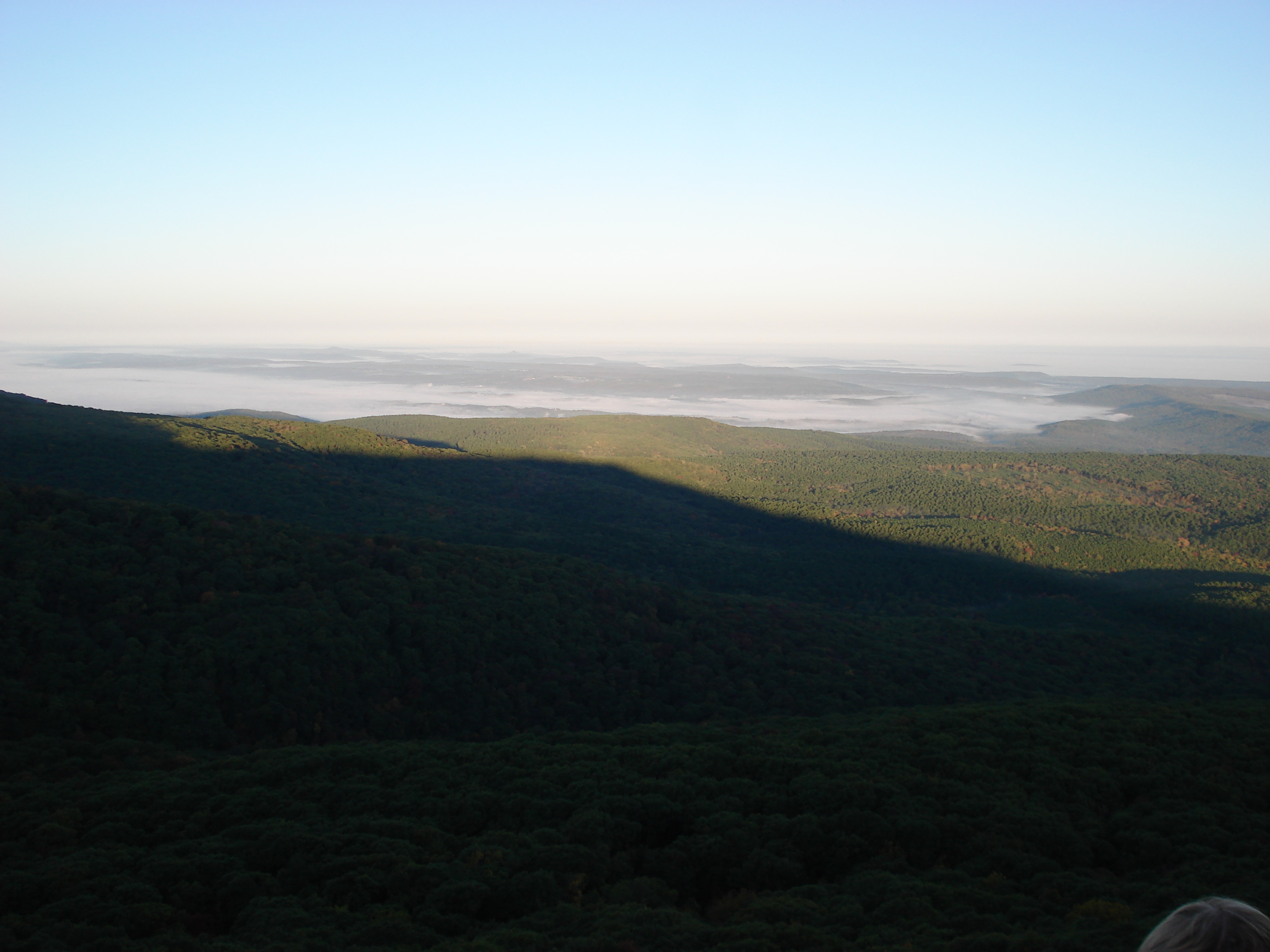
View from Arkansas' highest point, Mount Magazine.
