= Arkansas Highway 300 =

State highway in Arkansas, United States

Highway 300

Route information
- Maintained by ArDOT

Section 1
- Length: 34.11 mi (54.89 km)
- West end: AR 9 / AR 10 near Perryville
- East end: AR 10 in Little Rock

Section 2
- Length: 1.45 mi (2.33 km)
- West end: I-430 in Little Rock
- East end: US 70 in Little Rock

Location
- Country: United States
- State: Arkansas
- Counties: Perry, Pulaski

Highway system
- Arkansas Highway System; Interstate; US; State; Business; Spurs; Suffixed; Scenic; Heritage
← AR 299	→ AR 301

Arkansas Highway 300 (AR 300) is a designation for two state highways in Central Arkansas. One segment of 34.11 miles (54.89 km) runs from Highway 9/Highway 10 south of Perryville east to Highway 10 in Little Rock. A second segment of 1.45 miles (2.33 km) runs in Little Rock from Interstate 430 (I-430) east to U.S. Route 70 (US 70).

== Route description ==
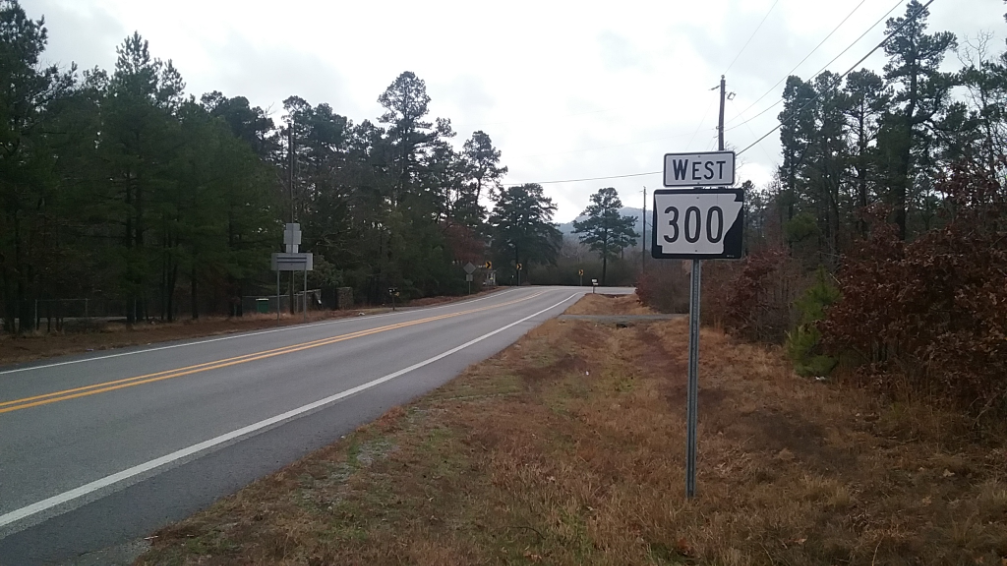
Highway 300 just south of Pinnacle Mountain

=== Perryville to Little Rock ===
Highway 300 begins at Highway 9/Highway 10 south of Perryville and runs east along the northern shore of Harris Brake Lake. The route forms a concurrency south with Highway 216 to Antioch before continuing east through the communities of Oakgrove and Pleasant Valley to Highway 113. After a brief concurrency south with Highway 113 where it climbs Wye Mountain, Highway 300 becomes very rural. The route skirts Lake Maumelle, the Ouachita National Recreation Trail, the Arkansas River, and Pinnacle Mountain State Park crossing both the Big and Little Maumelle Rivers (as well as the Pegasus Pipeline) while serving many unincorporated communities including Wye, Little Italy, Monnie Springs, Roland, Natural Steps, and Pinnacle before terminating at Highway 10 (Cantrell Road) in Little Rock near the base of Shinall Mountain. Immediately prior to this terminus, Highway 300 intersects Chenal Parkway, a thoroughfare connecting the route to Little Rock's Financial Centre District.

==== Arkansas River Trail ====
Between its northern concurrent split with Highway 113 at the base of Wye Mountain and its intersection with Roland Cutoff Road near Lundsford Corner, Highway 300 is designated as part of the Arkansas River Trail. Highway 300 reacquires this designation at its intersection with Henry Street in Roland and carries it south until it intersects Pinnacle Valley Road at Pinnacle Mountain State Park.

==== Big Maumelle River Truss Bridge ====
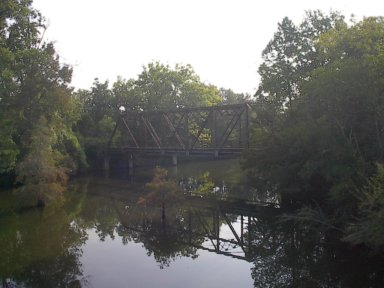
The old Highway 300 bridge over the Big Maumelle River is visible from the new bridge

In the 1920s, a one-lane truss bridge was built on Highway 300 to cross the Big Maumelle River. The bridge still stands in the shadow of Pinnacle Mountain, but was made obsolete by a new bridge in 1981. Today, it is only open to pedestrians for fishing and hiking. It is part of the Ouachita National Recreation Trail and is visible from the current bridge.

=== Little Rock ===
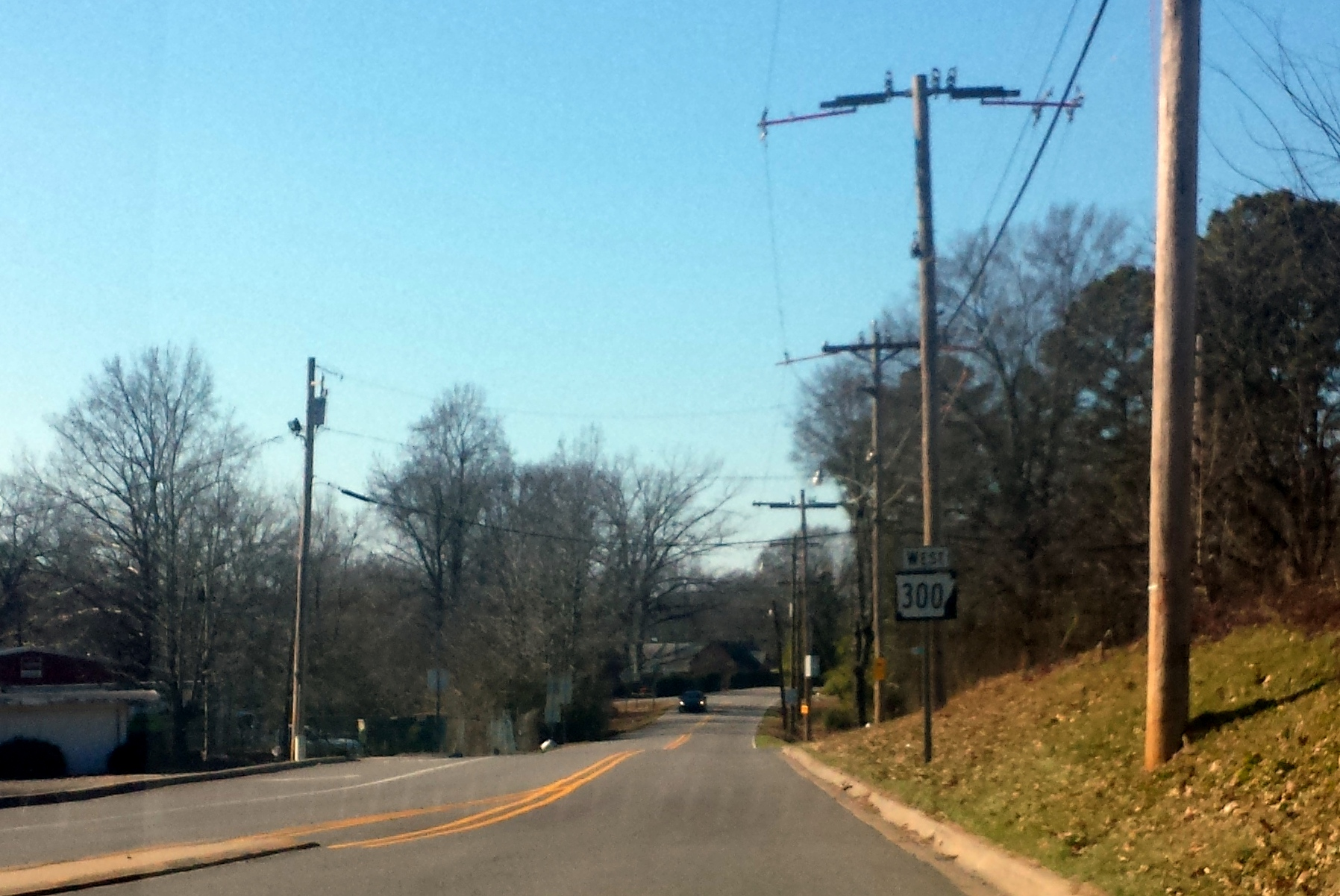
First Highway 300 reassurance marker west of US 70

The second segment of Highway 300 begins at I-430 and runs east as Colonel Glenn Road. The route runs to US 70, which maintains the Colonel Glenn Road designation east and is named Stagecoach Road to the west. Highway 300 had an average daily traffic (ADT) of 15,000 vehicles in 2010 near its eastern terminus.

== Major intersections ==
County	Location	mi	km	Destinations	Notes
Perry		0.00	0.00	AR 9 / AR 10 – Perryville, Thornburg	Western terminus
Perry		3.83	6.16	AR 216 east – Houston	Western end of AR 216 concurrency
Perry	Antioch	5.50	8.85	AR 216 west	Eastern end of AR 216 concurrency
Perry	Pleasant Valley	10.50	16.90	AR 113 north – Bigelow	Western end of AR 113 concurrency
Pulaski–Perry county line	Wye	13.61	21.90	AR 113 south	Eastern end of AR 113 concurrency
Pulaski	Little Rock	34.11	54.89	AR 10 (Cantrell Road) – Downtown Little Rock, Perryville	Eastern terminus
Pulaski	Little Rock	Gap in route			
Pulaski	Little Rock	0.00	0.00	I-430 – Fort Smith, Texarkana, Memphis	Western terminus; exit 4 on I-430
Pulaski	Little Rock	1.45	2.33	US 70 (Colonel Glenn Road / Stagecoach Road) – Downtown Little Rock	Eastern terminus; former AR 5
1.000 mi = 1.609 km; 1.000 km = 0.621 mi

== Former Ledwidge spur ==
Highway 300S
- Location: Little Italy to Ledwidge
- Length: 1.55 mi (2.49 km)
- Existed: May 23, 1973–September 30, 1992

In Little Italy, Highway 300 Spur followed Ross Hollow Road eastward to its intersection with Ledwedge Road. The spur then continued north along Ledwedge Road toward the community of Ledwidge near the Little Rock and Western Railway and the Arkansas River. Servicing Ledwidge was likely the original purpose of this branch of Highway 300.

== See also ==
- List of state highways in Arkansas
