= Houston Methodist Episcopal Church, South =

Historic church in Arkansas, United States

- U.S. National Register of Historic Places
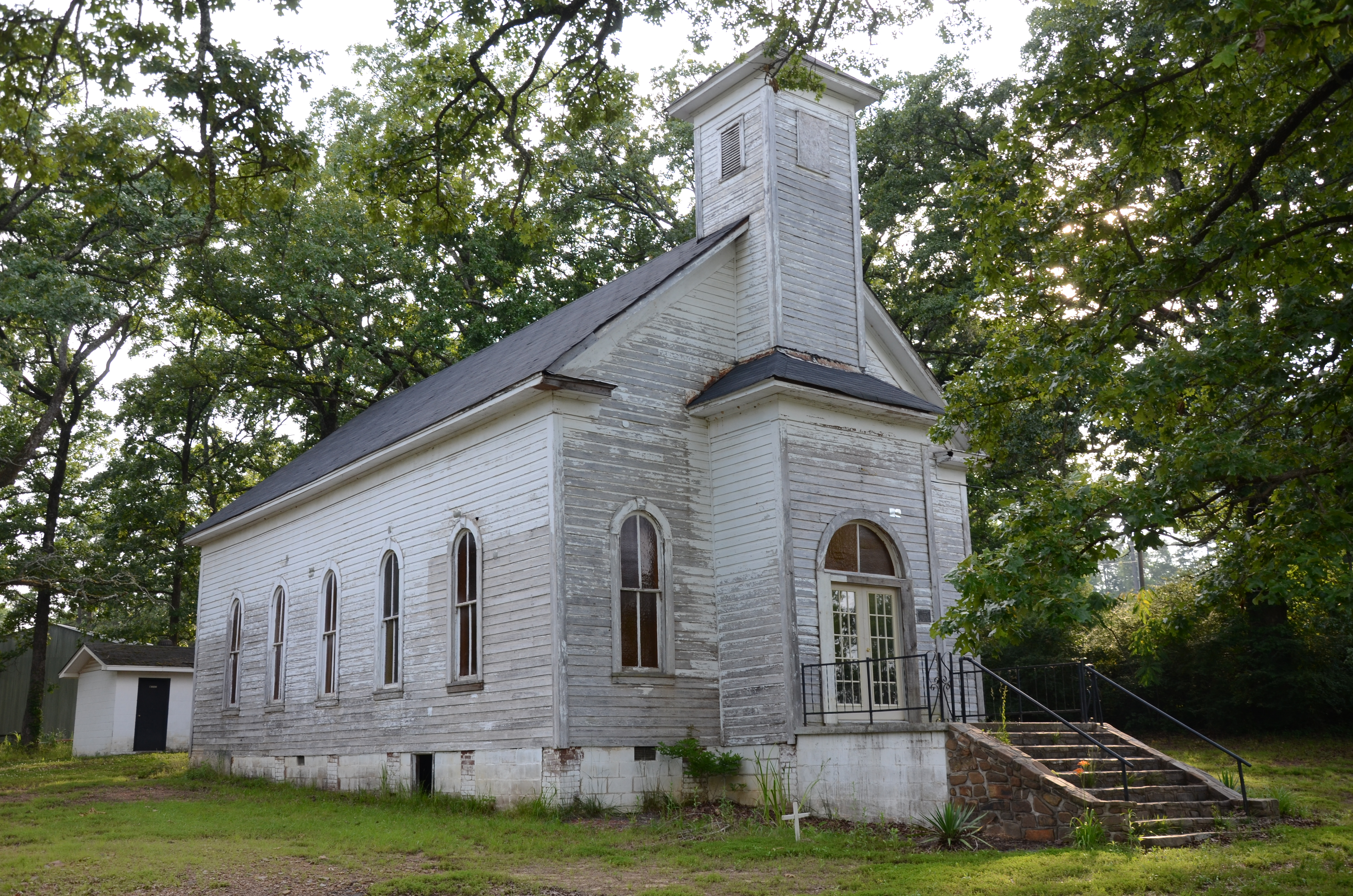

- Location within Arkansas Location within the United States
- Location: AR 60 SW side, near jct. with AR 216, Houston, Arkansas
- Coordinates: 35°1′54″N 92°41′33″W
- Area: less than one acre
- Built: 1912
- Architectural style: Colonial Revival, Plain traditional
- NRHP reference No.: 94000494
- Added to NRHP: May 20, 1994

Houston Methodist Episcopal Church, South is a historic church on Arkansas Highway 60, near its junction with Arkansas Highway 216 in Houston, Arkansas. It is a single-story wood-frame structure, with a gabled roof, weatherboard siding, and a foundation of brick and concrete. A hip-roof vestibule projects from the front, with a single-stage square tower above, topped by a pyramidal roof. Doors and windows are set in rounded-arch openings. Built in 1912 for a congregation organized in 1893; it was its second building, it having outgrown the first. It is a fine local example of ecclesiastical Colonial Revival architecture.

The building was listed on the National Register of Historic Places in 1994.

== See also ==
- National Register of Historic Places listings in Perry County, Arkansas
