= Arkansas Highway 9 =

American state highway

Highway 9

Route information
- Maintained by ArDOT
- Existed: 1926–present

Section 1
- Length: 51.44 mi (82.78 km)
- South end: US 79 at Eagle Mills
- North end: US 67 / US 270B in Malvern

Section 2
- Length: 79.76 mi (128.36 km)
- South end: AR 5 at Crows
- Major intersections: US 64 in Morrilton; I-40 in Morrilton
- North end: US 65 at Choctaw

Section 3
- Length: 94.41 mi (151.94 km)
- South end: US 65 / AR 16 in Clinton
- Major intersections: US 62 / US 412 in Salem
- North end: US 63 in Mammoth Spring

Location
- Country: United States
- State: Arkansas
- Counties: Ouachita, Dallas, Hot Spring, Saline, Perry, Conway, Van Buren, Stone, Izard, Fulton

Highway system
- Arkansas Highway System; Interstate; US; State; Business; Spurs; Suffixed; Scenic; Heritage
| ← AR 8 | → AR 10 |

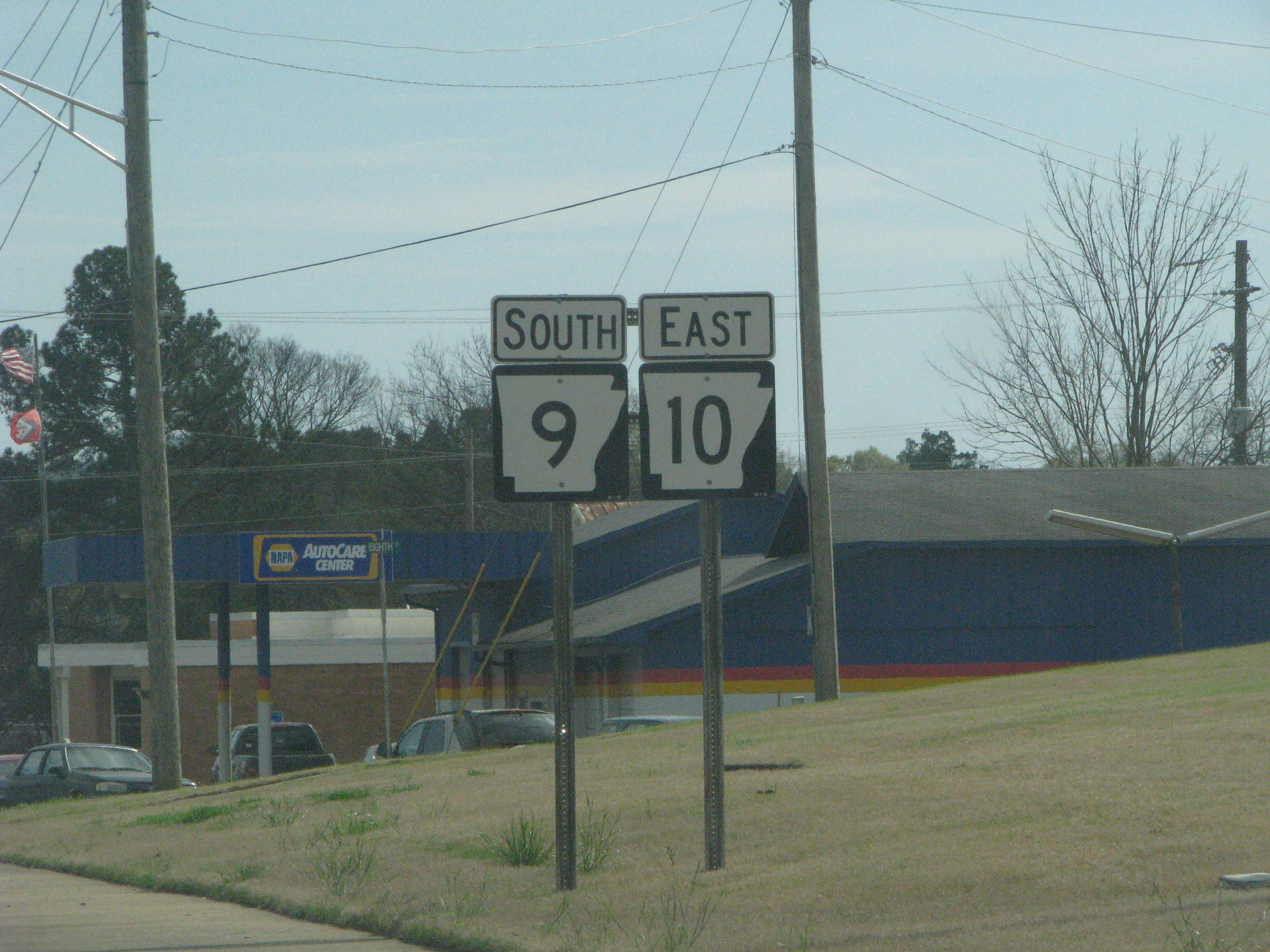
Highways 9 and 10 are concurrent through Perryville

Arkansas Highway 9 (AR 9) is a designation for three state highways in Arkansas. One segment of 51.44 miles (82.78 km) runs from U.S. Route 79 (US 79) at Eagle Mills north to US 67 in Malvern. A second segment of 79.76 miles (128.36 km) runs from Highway 5 at Crows north to US 65 at Choctaw. A third segment of 94.41 miles (151.94 km) runs from US 65 in Clinton north to US 63 in Mammoth Spring. The route was created during the 1926 Arkansas state highway numbering, and has seen only minor extensions and realignments since. Pieces of all three routes are designated as Arkansas Heritage Trails for use during the Civil War and the Trail of Tears.

The Highway 9 designation also extends to two spur routes and one business route. All routes are maintained by the Arkansas Department of Transportation (ArDOT).

== Route description ==
=== Eagle Mills to Malvern ===
Highway 9 begins at US 79 at Eagle Mills and heads north past numerous quarries and through Holly Springs and past numerous quarries before heading slightly east. The route then passes through Princeton, Tulip, and Lono before terminating at US 67 in Malvern.

=== Crows to Choctaw ===
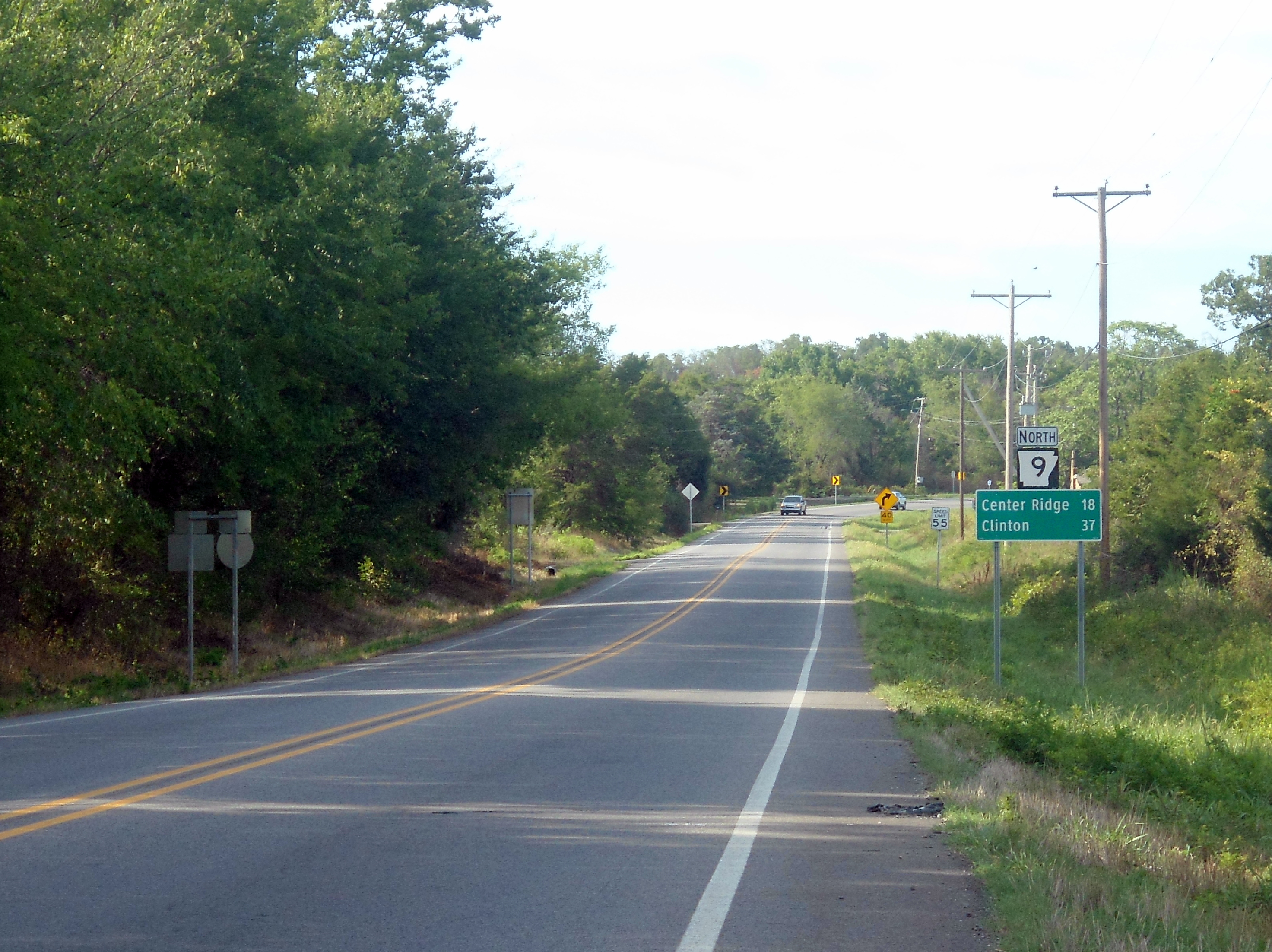
Highway 9 runs north in Morrilton

The route begins at Crows and runs north, with Highway 298 shooting east from Highway 9. Continuing north into Perry County, Highway 9 meets Highway 10 at Williams Junction and Highway 216 near Harris Rake. The route next meets Highway 60 in Perryville before entering Conway County. The route runs with Highway 113 and Highway 247 briefly south of Morrilton before meeting US 64 and Interstate 40 (I-40). Highway 9 has a spur and business route in Morrilton. Highway 915 strays from Highway 9 near Overcup Lake. Highway 9 also runs with Highway 92 from Birdtown to Center Ridge in Conway County. Highway 9 continues north to US 65 in Choctaw, where it terminates.

=== Clinton to Mammoth Spring ===
The route begins at US 65 in Clinton and runs northeast to Shirley with Highway 16, where it is crossed by Highway 110. Entering Stone County, the route runs north for several miles before meeting Highway 66 in Mountain View. It exits town northbound with Highway 5 and Highway 16. Highway 9 arrows east in Izard County, passing Highway 933, a former alignment of Highway 9. The route mostly follows the White River in eastern Izard County. Highway 9 detaches a spur route and meets Highway 69 in Melbourne. The route then meets Highway 56 in Brockwell before leaving the county. The route enters its final county, meeting Highway 395 before meeting US 62/US 412 and US 62B in Salem. The route trails northeast to Mammoth Spring, where it meets US 63 and terminates near the Missouri state line.

== History ==

Highway 9 was one of the original state highways, designated in 1926. State Road 9 ran from US 167 at Vanduzer to Malvern, and US 70 at Crows to Mammoth Spring. In September 1928, the southern terminus was relocated to US 167 at Eagle Mills. The highway was rerouted south of Clinton over a short section of Highway 130 near US 65 in 1953. In 1972, a bypass was built around Morrilton, with the former alignment becoming Highway 9B.

== Major intersections ==
Mile markers reset at some concurrencies.

| County | Location | mi | km | Destinations | Notes |
|---|---|---|---|---|---|
| Ouachita | Eagle Mills | 0.00 | 0.00 | US 79 – Fordyce, Camden | Southern terminus |
| Ouachita | | | | AR 203 south – Bearden | Northern terminus of AR 203 |
| Dallas | Holly Springs | | | AR 128 west – Sparkman | Eastern terminus of AR 128 |
| Dallas | | | | AR 273 south | Northern terminus of AR 273 |
| Dallas | | 20.25 | 32.59 | AR 8 east – Fordyce | Southern end of AR 8 concurrency |
| Dallas | | 0.00 | 0.00 | AR 8 west – Arkadelphia | Northern end of AR 8 concurrency |
| Dallas | | | | AR 48 east – Carthage | Western terminus of AR 48 |
| Dallas | | | | AR 46 east – Leola | Western terminus of AR 46 |
| Hot Spring | Lono | | | AR 222 – Donaldson | |
| Hot Spring | Malvern | 31.19 | 50.20 | US 67 / US 270B (South Main Street / East Page Avenue) to I-30 | Northern terminus |
Gap in route
| Saline | Crows | | | AR 5 – Benton, Hot Springs | Southern terminus |
| Saline | | | | AR 298 east | Western terminus of AR 298 |
| Perry | Williams Junction | | | AR 10 east – Little Rock | Southern end of AR 10 concurrency |
| Perry | | | | AR 324 west – Lake Sylvia | Eastern terminus of AR 324 |
| Perry | | | | AR 216 east – Pleasant Valley | Western terminus of AR 216 |
| Perry | | | | AR 300 east – Harris Brake State Wildlife Management Area | Western terminus of AR 300 |
| Perry | Perryville | | | AR 60 west (Aplin Avenue) | Southern end of AR 60 concurrency |
| Perry | Perryville | | | AR 60 east – Houston, Conway | Northern end of AR 60 concurrency |
| Perry | Perry | | | AR 10 west – Fort Smith | Northern end of AR 10 concurrency |
| Conway | Oppelo | | | AR 154 – Petit Jean State Park | |
| Conway | | | | AR 113 south – Houston | Northern terminus of AR 113 |
| Conway | Morrilton | | | AR 980 – Sardis, Airport | |
| Conway | Morrilton | | | US 64 – Morrilton, Plumerville | Interchange |
| Conway | Morrilton | | | AR 9S north – Industrial Park | Southern terminus of AR 9S |
| Conway | Morrilton | | | AR 9B south | Northern terminus of AR 9B |
| Conway | Morrilton | | | I-40 – Fort Smith, Little Rock | Exit 108 on I-40 |
| Conway | Morrilton | | | AR 287 east | Western terminus of AR 287 |
| Conway | | | | AR 915-2 (Overcup Lake Road) – Lake Overcup | |
| Conway | Solgohachia | | | AR 287 north | Southern terminus of AR 287 |
| Conway | | | | AR 92 west – Springfield | Southern end of AR 92 concurrency |
| Conway | Center Ridge | | | AR 124 west – Cleveland | Eastern terminus of AR 124 |
| Conway | Center Ridge | | | AR 92 east – Bee Branch | Northern end of AR 92 concurrency |
| Van Buren | Formosa | | | AR 336 east – Culpepper | Western terminus of AR 336 |
| Van Buren | Choctaw | 79.76 | 128.36 | US 65 – Clinton, Conway | Northern terminus |
| Van Buren | Gap in route | | | | |
| Van Buren | Clinton | 0.00 | 0.00 | US 65 / AR 16 west – Clinton, Marshall, Witts Spring | Southern terminus; southern end of AR 16 concurrency |
| Van Buren | Clinton | | | AR 980 (Airport Road) – Airport | |
| Van Buren | | | | AR 110 west – Botkinburg | Eastern terminus of AR 110 |
| Van Buren | Shirley | | | AR 16 east – Fairfield Bay, Heber Springs | Northern end of AR 16 concurrency |
| Stone | Rushing | | | AR 263 north – Fox | Southern end of AR 263 concurrency |
| Stone | | | | AR 263 south – Prim | Northern end of AR 263 concurrency |
| Stone | Mountain View | | | AR 66 west (Main Street) | Eastern terminus of AR 66 |
| Stone | Mountain View | | | AR 5 south / AR 14 east – Batesville | Southern end of AR 5/AR 14 concurrency |
| Stone | Mountain View | | | AR 382 west – Ozark Folk Center State Park | Eastern terminus of AR 382 |
| Stone | Allison | | | AR 5 north / AR 14 west – Calico Rock, Fifty Six, Blanchard Springs Caverns | Northern end of AR 5/AR 14 concurrency |
| White River | | 30.38– 30.53 | 48.89– 49.13 | Stone–Izard county line | |
| Izard | Sylamore | | | AR 933-1 | Former routing of AR 9 |
| Izard | Melbourne | | | AR 9S north (Circle Drive) – Industrial Park No. 1 | Southern terminus of AR 9S |
| Izard | Melbourne | | | AR 9S south – Industrial Park No. 1 | Northern terminus of AR 9S |
| Izard | Melbourne | 43.68 | 70.30 | AR 69 south (Main Street) – Batesville | Northern terminus of AR 69 |
| Izard | Brockwell | | | AR 56 – Calico Rock, Ash Flat | |
| Izard | Oxford | | | AR 354 east (First Street) | Western terminus of AR 354 |
| Fulton | Salem | 74.56 | 119.99 | US 62 / US 412 – Mountain Home, Ash Flat | |
| Fulton | Salem | | | US 62B west (Church Street) | Eastern terminus of US 62B |
| Fulton | Salem | | | AR 395 north | Southern terminus of AR 395 |
| Fulton | Mammoth Spring | | | AR 289 south – Saddle | Northern terminus of AR 289 |
| Fulton | Mammoth Spring | 94.41 | 151.94 | US 63 – Thayer, MO, Hardy | Northern terminus |
1.000 mi = 1.609 km; 1.000 km = 0.621 mi: Concurrency terminus

== Auxiliary routes ==
=== Melbourne spur ===
Highway 9S
- Location: Melbourne
- Length: 0.90 mi (1,450 m)
- Existed: January 23, 1974–present

Arkansas Highway 9 Spur is a spur route of 0.90 miles (1.45 km) in Melbourne. It is known colloquially as Circle Drive and Main Street.

The route was created in January 1974 along Main Street, and extended south along Circle Drive in 1985.

Major intersections
The entire route is in Melbourne, Izard County.

| mi | km | Destinations | Notes |
|---|---|---|---|
| 0.00 | 0.00 | AR 9 – Mountain View | Southern terminus |
| 0.90 | 1.45 | AR 9 (Main Street) – Salem | Northern terminus |
1.000 mi = 1.609 km; 1.000 km = 0.621 mi

=== Morrilton business route ===
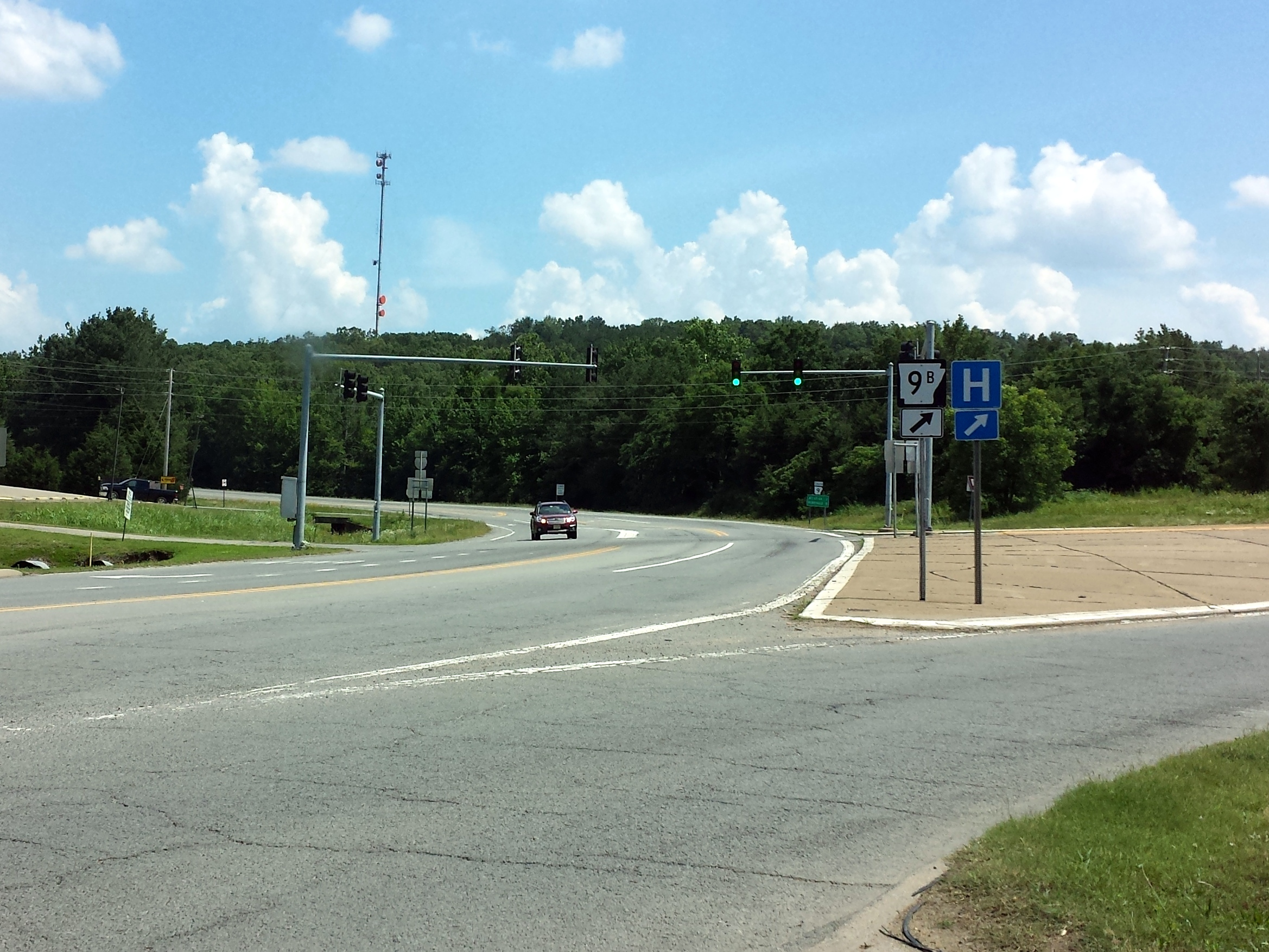
Highway 9B northern terminus at Highway 9

Highway 9B
- Location: Morrilton
- Length: 2.22 mi (3.57 km)
- Existed: February 25, 1976–present

Arkansas Highway 9 Business is a business route of 2.22 miles (3.57 km) in Morrilton.

Route description
Highway 9B begins at US 64 (Broadway Street) near the Union Pacific Railroad tracks. The route runs north on Saint Joseph Street away from downtown Morrilton before turning east for two blocks. Highway 9B intersects Highway 247 (Poor Farm Road) near Morrilton High School before running northeast through a commercial area with residential subdivisions. The route serves as the eastern terminus of Highway 132, known as University Boulevard, before curving northeast along the edge of the University of Arkansas Community College at Morrilton campus. Highway 9B terminates at Highway 9 in northeast Morrilton near the parent route's junction with I-40.

History
The route was created from a former alignment of Highway 9 in 1976. On May 14, 1997, the portion of the route south of US 64 was removed from the state highway system and turned back to city maintenance. The turnback was made at the request of the mayor of Morrilton in exchange for extending Highway 132 from Highway 247 to Highway 95.

Major intersections
The entire route is in Morrilton, Conway County.

| mi | km | Destinations | Notes |
|---|---|---|---|
| 2.22 | 3.57 | US 64 (Broadway Street) – Russellville, Conway | Southern terminus |
| | | AR 247 north (Poor Farm Road) | Southern terminus of AR 247 |
| | | AR 132 west (University Boulevard) – U of A Comm College Morrilton | Eastern terminus of AR 142 |
| 0.00 | 0.00 | AR 9 – Perryville, Overcup | Northern terminus |
1.000 mi = 1.609 km; 1.000 km = 0.621 mi

=== Morrilton spur ===
Highway 9S
- Location: Morrilton
- Length: 0.47 mi (760 m)
- Existed: January 30, 1986–present

Arkansas Highway 9 Spur is a spur route of 0.47 miles (0.76 km) in Morrilton. The route was created as an industrial access drive to the Morrilton Packing Company plant at the request of the Conway County judge in 1986. It was initially only 2,700 feet (820 m) in length, but was extended north due to another industry locating in the Morrilton Industrial Park on January 8, 1987.

Major intersections
The entire route is in Morrilton, Conway County.

| mi | km | Destinations | Notes |
|---|---|---|---|
| 0.00 | 0.00 | AR 9 | Southern terminus |
| 0.47 | 0.76 | Morrilton Industrial Park | Northern terminus |
1.000 mi = 1.609 km; 1.000 km = 0.621 mi

== See also ==
- List of state highways in Arkansas
