= Arkansas Highway 60 =

State highway in Arkansas, United States

Highway 60

Route information
- Maintained by ArDOT

Crawford County
- Length: 3.68 mi (5.92 km)
- North end: CR 23 near Rudy
- Major intersections: AR 282 from Rudy to Van Buren
- East end: US 64 / US 71B near Van Buren

Sebastian / Franklin counties
- Length: 8.5 mi (13.7 km)
- West end: AR 217 near Lavaca
- East end: AR 41 at Peter Pender

Logan County
- Length: 2.64 mi (4.25 km)
- West end: Old AR 10 at the Sebastian County line
- East end: AR 10 near Booneville

Main segment
- Length: 54.19 mi (87.21 km)
- West end: AR 28 in Plainview
- East end: US 65B / AR 365 in Conway

Location
- Country: United States
- State: Arkansas

Highway system
- Arkansas Highway System; Interstate; US; State; Business; Spurs; Suffixed; Scenic; Heritage
← AR 59	→ US 61

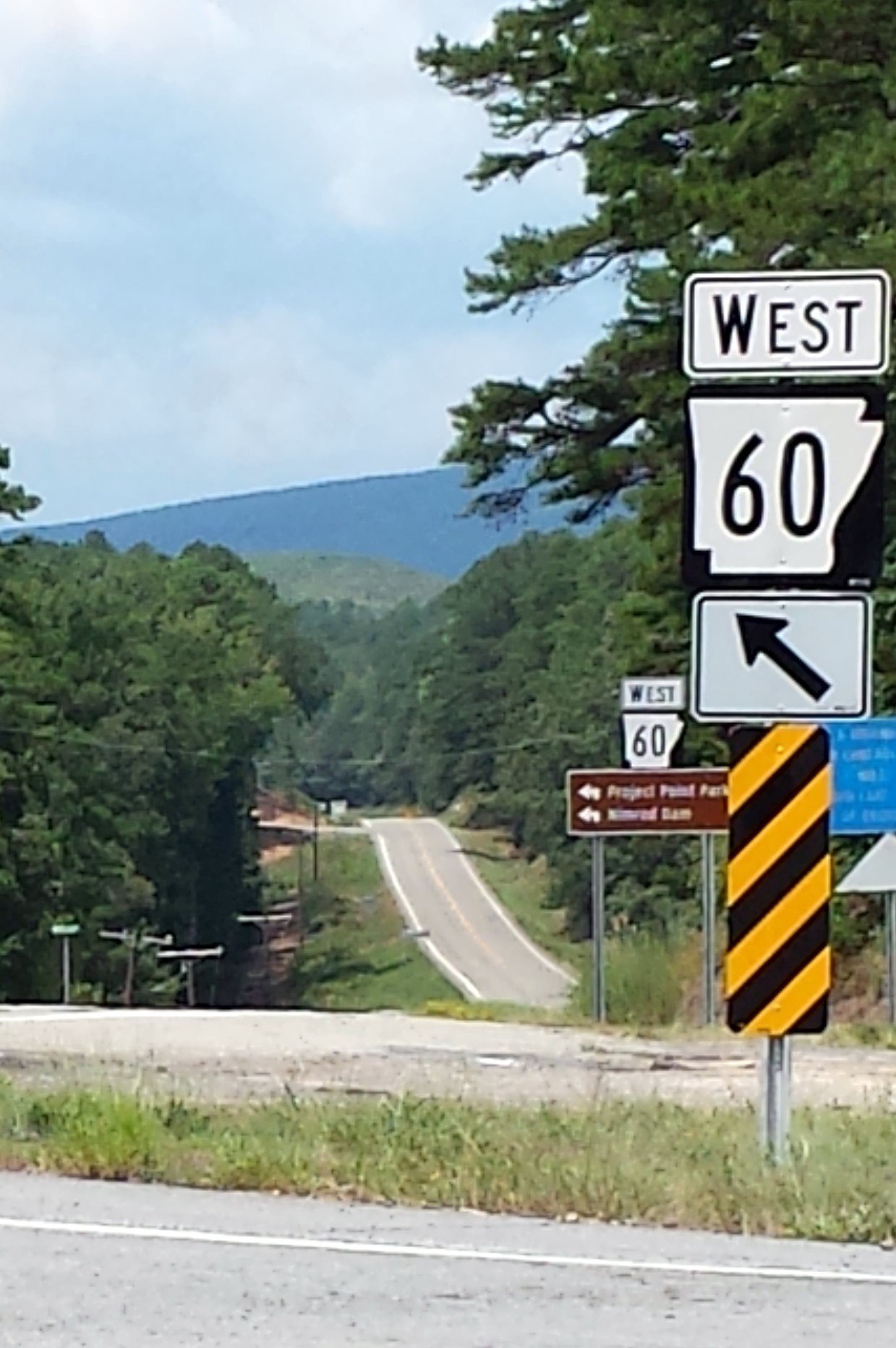
Highway 60 and Highway 7 intersection in Fourche Junction

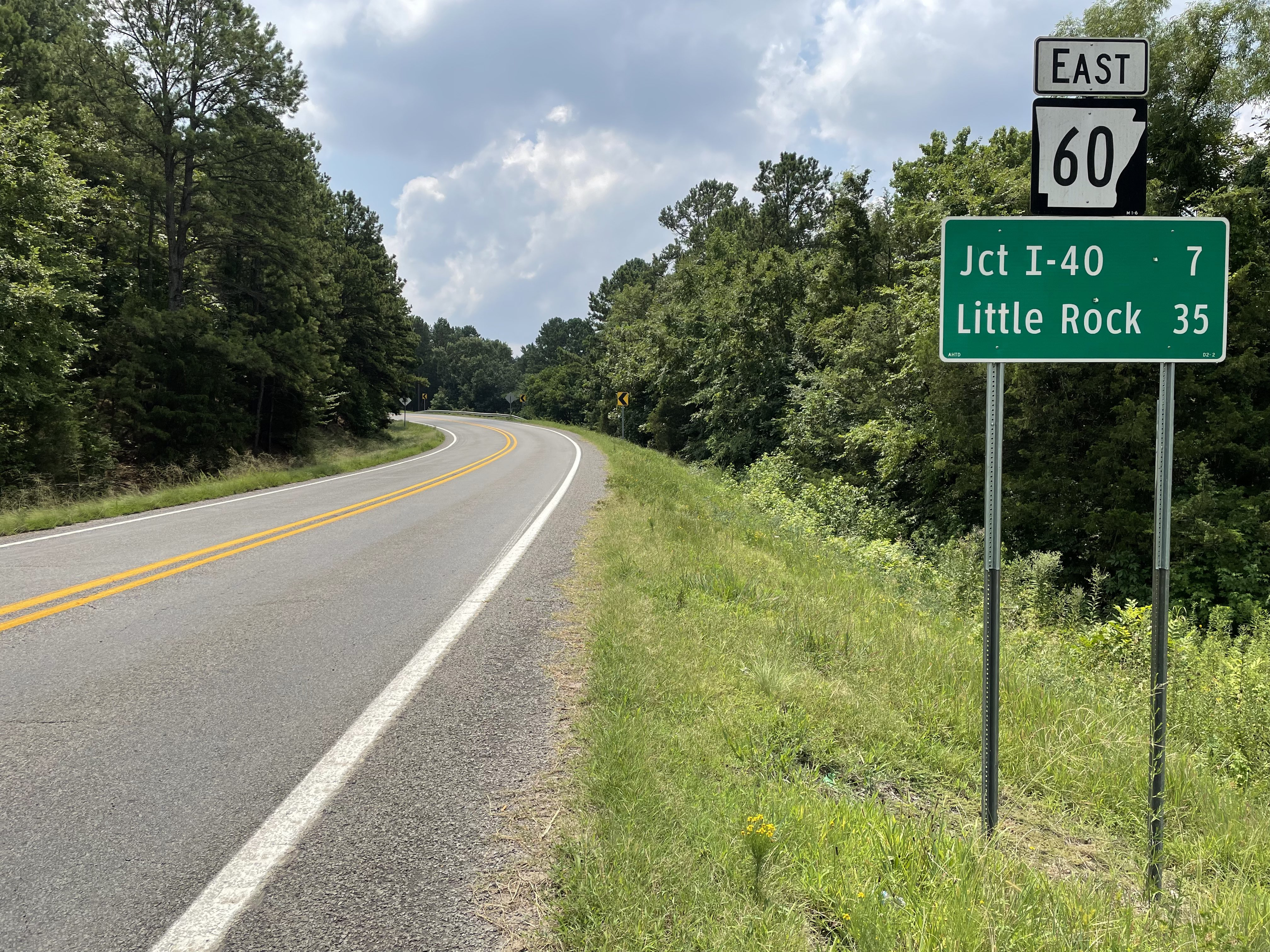
Highway 60 in Conway, Arkansas, after crossing the Arkansas River

Arkansas Highway 60 (AR 60, Ark. 60, Hwy. 60) is a state highway that exists in five separate sections in Arkansas. The longest and most well-known segment of 54.19 miles (87.21 km) runs from Highway 28 in Plainview east to U.S. Route 65B (US 65B) in Conway. A segment in western Logan County of 2.64 miles (4.25 km) begins at the Old Highway 10 at the Sebastian County line and runs east to Highway 10. A third segment of 10.80 miles (17.38 km) begins at Highway 252 near Lavaca and runs east to Highway 41 at Peter Pender. A fourth segment runs 1.34 miles (2.16 km) from US 64 and runs across Interstate 40/Interstate 540 (I-40/I-540) to Highway 282. A fifth route of 2.34 miles (3.77 km) begins at Highway 282 near Rudy and runs north to County Road 23 (CR 23).

== Route description ==
=== Crawford County ===
==== Rudy to CR 23 ====
The longer section of Highway 60 in Crawford County is 2.34 miles (3.77 km) long. The route runs north from Highway 282 at Rudy to terminate at Crawford County Road 23.

==== US 64 to Highway 282 ====
The shorter section of Highway 60 in Crawford County is 1.90 miles (3.06 km) long. The route runs north from US 64 over Interstate 40 to terminate at Highway 282.

This segment is the only section of Highway 60 that is signed north-south, as opposed to the rest of the highway, which is signed east-west.

=== Sebastian / Franklin counties ===
The section of Highway 60 in Franklin and Sebastian counties is 8.5 miles (13.7 km) long. The westernmost 1.1 miles (1.8 km) is located in Sebastian County, with the remaining 7.4 miles (11.9 km) in Franklin County. The route runs east from Highway 217 to terminate at Highway 41 at Peter Pender.

=== Logan County ===
The section of Highway 60 in Logan County runs for 2.64 miles (4.25 km). The route runs east from the Sebastian County line to Highway 10 west of Booneville.

=== Main segment ===
Highway 60 begins at an intersection with Highway 28 in Plainview. It runs east to the county line for 7.0 miles (11.3 km), passing by Nimrod Lake before reaching the county line.

The route then intersects Highway 7 and runs parallel with the Fourche La Fave River and passes through Nimrod. It runs east for another 10.1 miles (16.3 km) until it intersects the northern terminus of Highway 155. It then reaches the town of Perryville and runs concurrent with Highway 10 for 0.3 miles (0.48 km). Then Highway 60 continues east towards Houston. About 0.1 miles (0.16 km) west of Highway 216, Highway 113 becomes concurrent with Highway 60.

Highway 60 then runs concurrent with Highway 113 for about 7.7 miles (12.4 km). The highway then proceeds northeast after splitting from Highway 113 and crosses over the Arkansas River before entering Conway. It runs east for about 1.5 miles (2.4 km) before reaching its eastern terminus at U.S. Route 65B (US 65B).

== Major intersections ==
The entire route is in Crawford County.

Location	mi	km	Destinations	Notes
	0.0	0.0	Old 88 Road	
	1.9	3.1	AR 348 west	
	2.5	4.0	AR 282 to I-540 – Rudy	
Gap in route
	7.4	11.9	AR 282	
	8.8	14.2	US 64 / US 71B – Alma, Van Buren	
1.000 mi = 1.609 km; 1.000 km = 0.621 mi

County	Location	mi	km	Destinations	Notes
Sebastian		0.0	0.0	AR 252	
Franklin		3.2	5.1	AR 217	
Franklin	Peter Pender	10.6	17.1	AR 41	
1.000 mi = 1.609 km; 1.000 km = 0.621 mi

The entire route is in Logan County.

Location	mi	km	Destinations	Notes
	0.0	0.0	Old Highway 10	Sebastian County line
	2.3	3.7	AR 10	
1.000 mi = 1.609 km; 1.000 km = 0.621 mi

County	Location	mi	km	Destinations	Notes
Yell	Plainview	0.0	0.0	AR 28 to AR 27 – Ola	
Perry	Fourche Junction	8.6	13.8	AR 7 – Ola, Hot Springs	
Perry	Aplin	18.7	30.1	AR 155 south	
Perry	Perryville	29.4	47.3	AR 9 south / AR 10 east – Williams Junction	West end of AR 9/AR 10 concurrency
Perry	Perryville	29.7	47.8	AR 9 north / AR 10 west – Perry	East end of AR 9/AR 10 concurrency
Perry	Houston	36.3	58.4	AR 113 north – Morrilton	Western end of AR 113 concurrency
Perry	Houston	36.4	58.6	AR 216 west	
Perry		40.1	64.5	AR 113 south – Bigelow	Eastern end of AR 113 concurrency
Arkansas River		47.7	76.8	Toad Suck Ferry Lock and Dam	
Faulkner				Prince Street – Conway	Former routing of AR 60
Faulkner	Conway	52.9	85.1	AR 60S (Donaghey Avenue) – University of Central Arkansas	
Faulkner	Conway	54.4	87.5	US 65B / AR 365 south to I-40 (US 65)	Interchange; former US 65
1.000 mi = 1.609 km; 1.000 km = 0.621 mi: Concurrency terminus

== See also ==
- List of state highways in Arkansas
