= Wye Mountain =

Mountain ridge in Arkansas, United States

- Location within Arkansas Location within the United States

Highest point
- Elevation: 787 ft (240 m)
- Coordinates: 34°55′55″N 92°40′38″W

Geography
- Location: Wye Township & Big Rock Township, Arkansas, United States
- Parent range: Ouachita Mountains

Geology
- Mountain type: Ridge

Climbing
- Access: Arkansas Highway 113; Arkansas Highway 300; Tram Road

Wye Mountain is a ridge in Perry and Pulaski counties in the U.S. state of Arkansas. It is located in the northeastern foothills of the Ouachita Mountains near Bigelow between the Fourche LaFave and Big Maumelle river valleys.
