= Little Italy, Arkansas =

- Unincorporated community
- Location of Little Italy in Arkansas Little Italy, Arkansas (the United States)
- Coordinates: 34°56′15″N 92°35′10″W
- Country: United States
- State: Arkansas
- Counties: Perry; Pulaski
- Townships: Wye Township; Big Rock Township
- Elevation: 692 ft (211 m)
- Time zone: UTC-6 (Central (CST))
  - Summer (DST): UTC-5 (CDT)
- ZIP code: 72016; 72135
- Area code: +1 (501)
- GNIS feature ID: 51290

Established initially as Alta Villa by the five original Italian immigrant families who settled there in 1915, Little Italy is an unincorporated community in Pulaski and Perry counties in the U.S. state of Arkansas. The culturally rich and historically significant village is located in high terrain along Arkansas Highway 300 amidst the northeastern foothills of the Ouachita Mountains bestriding Wye Mountain, Kryer Mountain, and their vale.

For the early Italian immigrants of Little Italy, their belief in God and devotion to the religion of their homeland was of utmost importance. Priests traveling by way of locomotive from Little Rock initially celebrated Mass for local devotees at a schoolhouse in the nearby community of Ledwidge. St. Francis of Assisi Catholic Church was officially established in Little Italy in 1922 once a building more suitable for worship and consecration was erected. Since its inception, the church has remained an integral part of the community's identity and activity.

Also central to Little Italy's identity is its history in the winemaking industry as well as its renowned status as a safe haven for the purchase and consumption of unadulterated alcoholic beverages during Prohibition. At its height, the community boasted four commercial wineries and two taverns.

In 2015, as part of a multi-decade heritage preservation endeavor, Little Italy's residents unsuccessfully sought to become an incorporated municipality. As part of that same effort to preserve and promote its history and culture, members of the community founded a heritage society in 2018 and opened a heritage museum in 2019. With similar sentiment, Little Italy marks its important anniversaries with homecoming events and celebrations.

Since 1927, Little Italy's residents host an annual Italian festival highlighted by a spaghetti and sausage dinner featuring original, intergenerational recipes.

== See also ==
=== Other historically Italian settlements in Arkansas ===
Catholic Point, Arkansas
Sunnyside Plantation, Arkansas
Tontitown, Arkansas
