= Arkansas Highway 113 =

State highway in Arkansas, United States

Highway 113

Route information
- Maintained by AHTD
- Length: 29.48 mi (47.44 km)
- Existed: 1926–present

Major junctions
- South end: AR 10 near Wye
- AR 60 from Bigelow to Houston; AR 9 near Oppelo; US 64 / AR 95 in Morrilton
- North end: US 64 near Blackwell

Location
- Country: United States
- State: Arkansas
- Counties: Pulaski, Perry, Conway

Highway system
- Arkansas Highway System; Interstate; US; State; Business; Spurs; Suffixed; Scenic; Heritage
← AR 112	→ AR 114

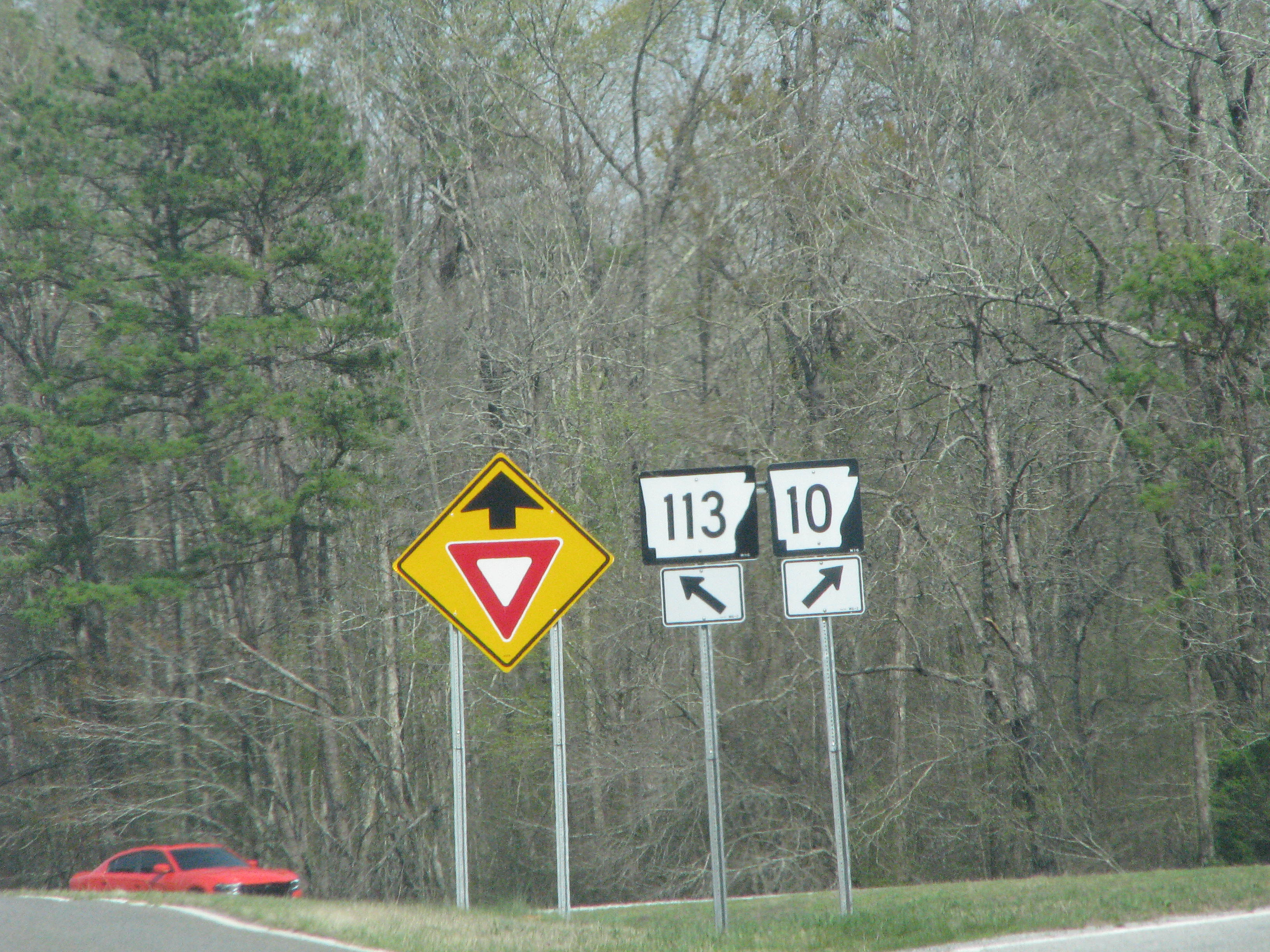
Highway 113 splits with Highway 10 south of Wye

Arkansas Highway 113 (AR 113) is a north–south state highway in Central Arkansas. The route runs 29.48 miles (47.44 km) from Highway 10 south of Wye north to U.S. Route 64 (US 64) east of Blackwell. This also gives access to some rural areas west of Morrilton. It runs through Pulaski, Perry, and Conway counties. It contains no spur of business routes.

== Route description ==
Highway 113 begins at Highway 10 south of Wye. It runs north 5.8 miles (9.3 km) to Wye where Highway 300 forms a concurrency. The route then continues heading north for 3.2 miles (5.1 km) to Pleasant Valley where Highway 300 continues west. Highway 113 continues heading north and heads through Bigelow and then joins with Highway 60 west to Houston.

In Houston, Highway 113 departs Highway 60 and heads north again to where it meets Highway 9 south of the Arkansas River. It crosses the Arkansas River into Morrilton. There, it joins US 64 for a short time then departs west to run on its own course parallel to that highway. The route terminates at US 64 east of Blackwell.

== History ==
Arkansas Highway 113 was designated as part of the original 1926 state highways a route from Leola to Poyen. By 1928, a second segment was created from Highway 10 to Bigelow and this segment was labeled 'impassable'. Between 1943 and 1945, the highway was extended to Morrilton. In 1957, the segment from Leola to Poyen was renumbered to Highway 229. The segment along US 64 was added in 1963.

== Major intersections ==
County	Location	mi	km	Destinations	Notes
Pulaski		0.0	0.0	AR 10 – Perryville, Little Rock	Southern terminus
Pulaski–Perry county line	Wye	5.8	9.3	AR 300 east – Little Italy	Southern end of AR 300 concurrency
Perry	Pleasant Valley	9.0	14.5	AR 300 west – Pleasant Valley	Northern end of AR 300 concurrency
Perry		13.9	22.4	AR 60 east – Conway	Southern end of AR 60 concurrency
Perry	see AR 60 (mile 40.1–36.3)				
Perry	Houston	0.0	0.0	AR 60 west – Perryville	Northern end of AR 60 concurrency
Conway	Oppelo	6.3	10.1	AR 154 west	Eastern terminus of AR 154
Conway		7.8	12.6	AR 9 – Oppelo, Morrilton, Perryville	Northern terminus
Conway	Gap in route				
Conway	Morrilton	0.0	0.0	US 64 (Broadway Street) / AR 95 north (Division Street)	Southern terminus; southern terminus of AR 95
Conway	Blackwell	7.8	12.6	US 64 – Morrilton, Atkins, Russellville	Northern terminus
1.000 mi = 1.609 km; 1.000 km = 0.621 mi: Concurrency terminus

== See also ==
- List of state highways in Arkansas
