= History of Italians in Arkansas =

There was a historical trend of immigration of Italians into the U.S. state of Arkansas in the 19th and 20th centuries.

Austin Corbin, the owner of the Sunnyside Plantation in Chicot County, within the Arkansas Delta region, decided to employ Italians there during the post-Reconstruction period. The Mayor of Rome, Don Emanuele Ruspoli, connected to Corbin, found potential employees who originated in Emilia-Romagna, Marche, and Veneto, convincing them to go to Sunnyside. 98 families boarded the Chateau Yquem in Genoa with New Orleans as the destination. In November 1895 the ship docked in the United States, and the surviving passengers traveled onward to Sunnyside. The climate and drinking water conditions were difficult. A descendant of these Italians, Libby Borgognoni, stated that 125 of them died during the first year of operations. Corbin had misrepresented the nature of the plantation to the potential employees. Italians came to Sunnyside even after Corbin's death in 1896.

Italians later moved from the Arkansas Delta to the Ozarks, establishing Tontitown.

== See also ==
Little Italy, Arkansas
Catholic Point, Arkansas
