= Lundsford Corner, Arkansas =

- Unincorporated community
- Location of Lundsford Corner in Arkansas Lundsford Corner, Arkansas (the United States)
- Coordinates: 34°54′26″N 92°32′59″W
- Country: United States
- State: Arkansas
- County: Pulaski
- Elevation: 299 ft (91 m)
- Time zone: UTC-6 (Central (CST))
  - Summer (DST): UTC-5 (CDT)
- GNIS feature ID: 57099

Lundsford Corner, also known as Lunsford Corner, is an unincorporated community in Pulaski County, Arkansas, United States near the north shore of Lake Maumelle on Arkansas Highway 300. At this point, Highway 300 runs south-southeast and makes a sharp turn to the east-northeast. The community itself lies approximately 0.5 miles east-northeast of the actual corner at the highway's intersection with Roland Cutoff Road. There are no signs along Highway 300 marking the community, though it occasionally appears on modern-day maps. The Ouachita National Recreation Trail crosses Highway 300 at Lundsford Corner before it heads south toward Pinnacle Mountain State Park. This portion of the trail is sometimes known as Lundsford Crossing and is frequently used as an entry point for hikers.
