= Arkansas Highway 216 =

State highway in Arkansas, United States

Highway 216

Route information
- Maintained by ArDOT
- Length: 10.30 mi (16.58 km)

Major junctions
- West end: AR 9 / AR 10 near Perryville
- East end: AR 60 / AR 113 in Houston

Location
- Country: United States
- State: Arkansas
- Counties: Perry

Highway system
- Arkansas Highway System; Interstate; US; State; Business; Spurs; Suffixed; Scenic; Heritage
← AR 215	→ AR 217

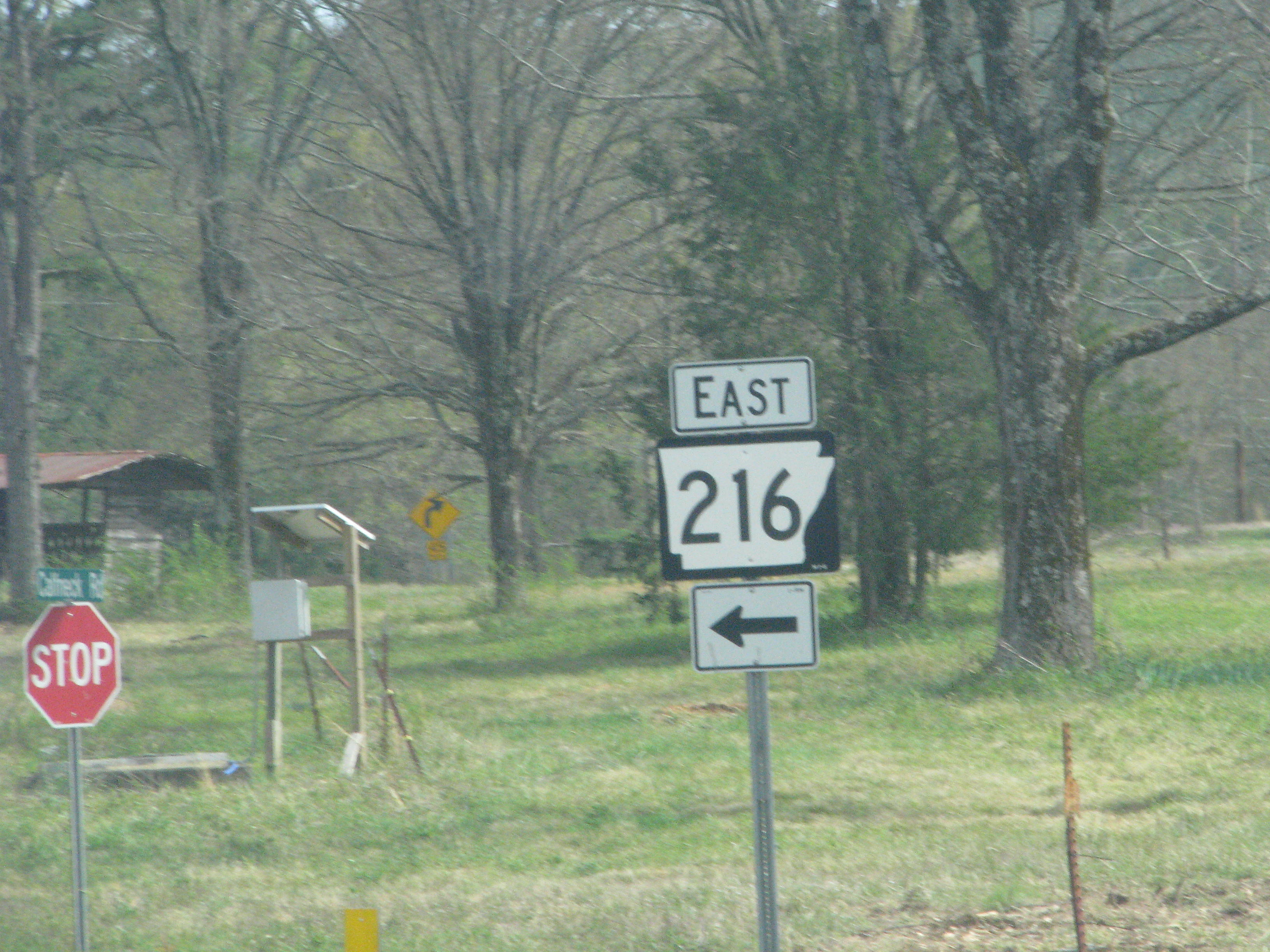
Arkansas Highway 216 in rural Perry County.

Arkansas Highway 216 (AR 216) is an east–west state highway in Perry County, Arkansas. The route runs 10.30 miles (16.58 km) from Highway 9/Highway 10 south of Perryville east to Highway 60/Highway 113 in Houston. The route is two-lane, undivided.

== Route description ==
The route begins at Highway 9/Highway 10 south of Perryville. Highway 216 runs along the southern shore of Lake Harris Brake to Antioch, where a concurrency begins with Highway 300. The routes run north until the northeast corner of the Lake, when Highway 300 turns west, and Highway 216 continues north. Highway 216 winds northeast to Houston, where it terminates at Highway 60/Highway 113.

== Major intersections ==
The entire route is in Perry County.

Location	mi	km	Destinations	Notes
	0.00	0.00	AR 9 / AR 10 – Williams Junction, Perryville	Western terminus
Antioch	3.23	5.20	AR 300 east – Pleasant Valley	Western end of AR 300 concurrency
	4.90	7.89	AR 300 west – Harris Brake Dam	Eastern end of AR 300 concurrency
Houston	10.30	16.58	AR 60 / AR 113 – Conway, Perryville, Morrilton	Eastern terminus
1.000 mi = 1.609 km; 1.000 km = 0.621 mi: Concurrency terminus

== See also ==
- List of state highways in Arkansas
