= Kryer Mountain =

Mountain in Arkansas, United States

- Location within Arkansas Location within the United States

Highest point
- Elevation: 705 ft (215 m)
- Coordinates: 34°55′46″N 92°33′30″W

Geography
- Location: Big Rock Township, Arkansas, United States
- Parent range: Ouachita Mountains

Geology
- Mountain type: Ridge

Climbing
- Access: Arkansas Highway 300; Dwight Little Road

Kryer Mountain is a ridge in Pulaski county in the U.S. state of Arkansas. It is located in the northeastern foothills of the Ouachita Mountains near Roland between the Arkansas and Big Maumelle river valleys.
