= Crows, Arkansas =

- Unincorporated community
- Crows's position in Arkansas. Crows, Arkansas (the United States)
- Coordinates: 34°36′51″N 92°46′10″W
- Country: United States
- State: Arkansas
- County: Saline
- Township: Dyer
- Elevation: 410 ft (120 m)
- Time zone: UTC-6 (Central (CST))
  - Summer (DST): UTC-5 (CDT)
- Area code: 870

Crows is an unincorporated community in Dyer Township, Saline County, Arkansas. It is located in the valley of the Middle Fork Saline River at the intersection of Arkansas highways 5 and 9.
