= Fourche Junction, Arkansas =

- Unincorporated community
- Location within Arkansas Location within the United States
- Coordinates: 34°57′23″N 93°09′26″W
- Country: United States
- State: Arkansas
- County: Perry
- Elevation: 436 ft (133 m)
- Time zone: UTC-6 (Central (CST))
  - Summer (DST): UTC-5 (CDT)
- Area code: 501
- GNIS feature ID: 71667

Fourche Junction is an unincorporated community in Perry County, Arkansas, United States. The community is located at the junction of Arkansas Highway 7 and Arkansas Highway 60 along the Fourche La Fave River, near the Nimrod Dam and 20.5 miles (33.0 km) west of Perryville.
