= Old Sebastian County Jail =

- U.S. National Register of Historic Places
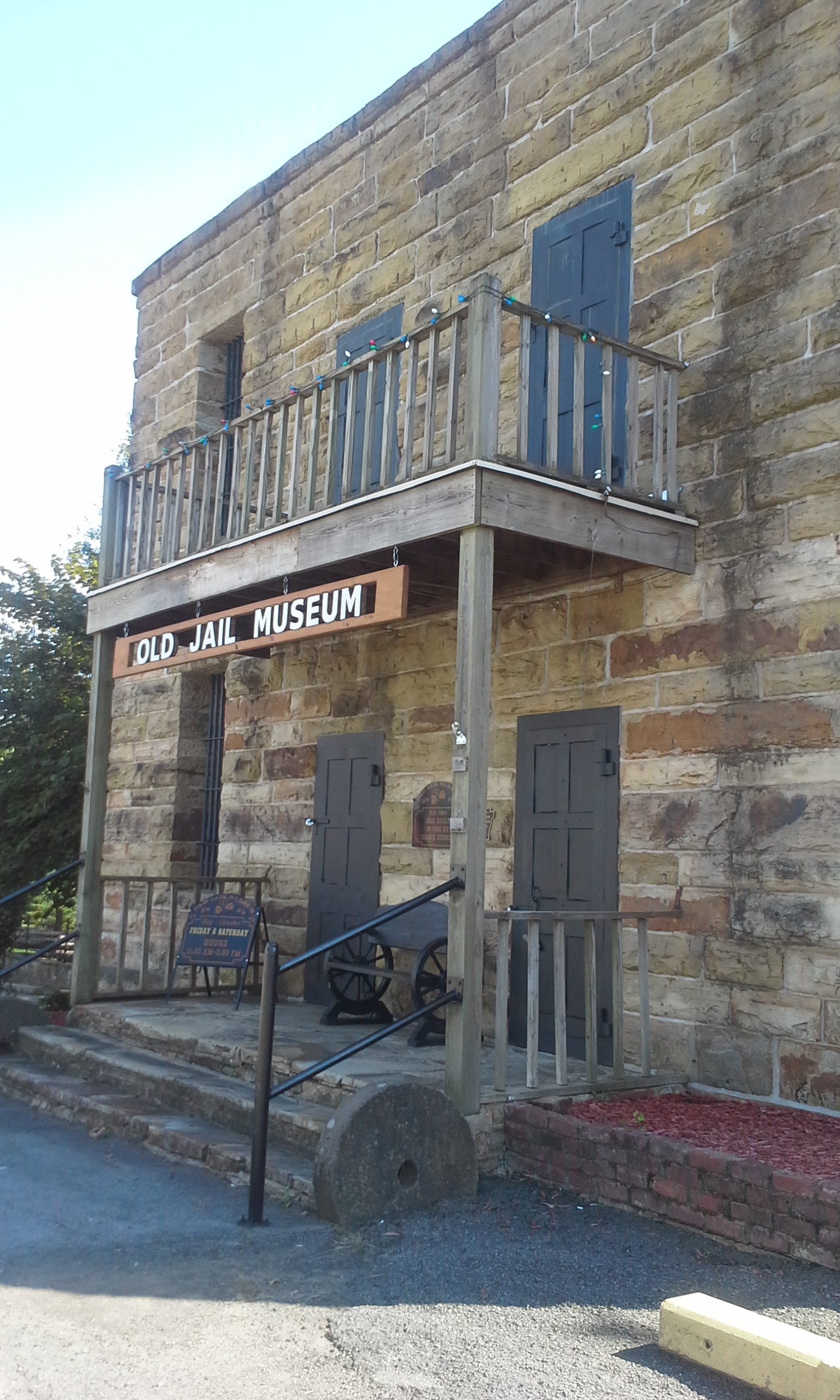

- Location within Arkansas Location within the United States
- Location: AR 10, E of County Courthouse, Greenwood, Arkansas
- Coordinates: 35°12′43″N 94°15′16″W
- Area: less than one acre
- Built: 1889
- Built by: Issac Kunkel
- NRHP reference No.: 94001413
- Added to NRHP: December 1, 1994

The Old Sebastian County Jail is a historic former jail in Greenwood, Arkansas. It is a two-story stone building, located just east of the Sebastian County Courthouse on the south side of Arkansas Highway 10 in the city center. It was built 1889-91 by Ike Kunkel, a local master mason, and is one of the city's finest examples of cut stone masonry. It is also believed to be the oldest county government building. It was used primarily as a holding jail for detainees awaiting transport to facilities in Fort Smith, and is now operated by the South Sebastian County Historical Society as a local history museum known as the Old Jail Museum.

The building was listed on the National Register of Historic Places in 1994.

== See also ==
- National Register of Historic Places listings in Sebastian County, Arkansas
