= Little Rock and Western Railway =

Overview
- Parent company: Genesee and Wyoming
- Headquarters: Perry, Arkansas
- Reporting mark: LRWN
- Locale: Arkansas
- Dates of operation: 1900–present

Technical
- Track gauge: 4 ft 8 1/2 in (1,435 mm) standard gauge
- Length: 68 miles (109 km)

Other
- Website: Official website

The Little Rock and Western Railway (reporting mark LRWN) is a Class III short-line railroad headquartered in Perry, Arkansas, and owned by Genesee & Wyoming Inc.

LRWN operates over a 79 miles (127 km) line from Danville, Arkansas to Pulaski, Arkansas, then over 3 miles (4.8 km) of Union Pacific Railroad (UP) trackage rights to North Little Rock, Arkansas where it interchanges with Union Pacific. LRWN also serves as the agent for BNSF Railway to interchange cars between BNSF and UP at North Little Rock.

LRWN traffic generally consists of wood and paper products, grain, limestone slurry, cornstarch, salt, LP gas, and pulp mill liquid.

== History ==
The line was initially built in 1900 by the Choctaw, Oklahoma and Gulf Railroad, and became part of the Chicago, Rock Island and Pacific Railroad main line between Memphis, Tennessee, and Tucumcari, New Mexico, in 1904. When the Rock Island abandoned operations, Green Bay Packaging (whose Arkansas Kraft paper mill north of Perry was and is a major shipper on the line) obtained the Perry to Pulaski line and started LRWN shortline service in 1980. In 1983, Green Bay Packaging partnered with Rail Management Corporation and later sold the LRWN to RMC. In 1986, LRWN was authorized to operate the Danville to Perry segment, owned by Continental Grain Company. Genesee & Wyoming Inc. purchased RMC in June 2005.
