= Arkansas Highway 282 =

State highway in Arkansas, United States

Highway 282

Route information
- Maintained by AHTD
- Length: 19.48 mi (31.35 km)

Major junctions
- South end: US 64 east of Van Buren
- I-49 – Rudy; US 71 – Dean's Market; US 71 – Mountainburg; I-49 – Chester
- North end: Brown St., Chester

Location
- Country: United States
- State: Arkansas
- Counties: Crawford

Highway system
- Arkansas Highway System; Interstate; US; State; Business; Spurs; Suffixed; Scenic; Heritage
← AR 281	→ AR 283

Arkansas Highway 282 is a north–south state highway in Crawford County. The route runs 19.48 miles (31.35 km) north from Van Buren to Chester. The route parallels Interstate 49 for almost its entire length.

== Route description ==
AR 282 begins at US 64 east of Van Buren. The route crosses I-40/I-49/US 71 (no interchange) east of Van Buren before turning north towards Rudy. AR 282 concurs with AR 348 in Rudy before turning east to cross I-49 again. The route continues east to Dean's Market, running north briefly with US 71/AR 162/AR 348. The route continues due north alone, crossing and then crossing back over I-49. AR 282 meets US 71 again in Mountainburg before again crossing I-49 to Chester. In Chester, AR 282 terminates at Brown Street.

== Major intersections ==
The entire route is in Crawford County.

Location	mi	km	Destinations	Notes
Van Buren	0.00	0.00	US 64 / US 71B – Alma, Van Buren	Western terminus of southern section; road continues south as Spradley Road
	1.57	2.53	AR 60 east	
	6.50	10.46	AR 60 north	
Rudy	9.45	15.21	I-49 – Fort Smith, Fayetteville	Exit 24 on I-49; former I-540
Rudy	9.74	15.68	AR 282 Link north	Southern terminus of AR 282 Link
Rudy	10.13	16.30	US 71 south – Alma	
US 71 concurrency, 0.7 miles (1.1 km)
	0.00	0.00	US 71 north – Fayetteville	
			AR 282 Link south	Northern terminus of AR 282 Link
	5.99	9.64	AR 282S west to I-49	Eastern terminus of AR 282S
Mountainburg	7.52	12.10	US 71 – Fayetteville, Alma	Eastern terminus of southern section
Gap in route
	1.83	2.95	US 71 – Fayetteville, Alma	Eastern terminus of northern section
	0.82	1.32	I-49 – Fort Smith, Fayetteville	Exit 34 on I-49; former I-540
Chester	0.00	0.00	Brown Street / Front Avenue	Western terminus of northern section; road continues as Front Avenue
1.000 mi = 1.609 km; 1.000 km = 0.621 mi: Concurrency terminus

== Spur route ==
Highway 282S
- Location: Near Mountainburg
- Length: 0.97 mi (1,560 m)
- Existed: 2010–present

Arkansas Highway 282 Spur is a spur route of 0.97 miles (1.56 km), following Dollard Road in Crawford County near Mountainburg. The route connects AR 282 over Interstate 49 to the local Arkansas State Highway and Transportation Department shop.

=== Major junctions ===
The entire route is in Crawford County.

Location	mi	km	Destinations	Notes
	0.00	0.00	I-49 – Fort Smith, Fayetteville	Western terminus; exit 29 on I-49; former I-540
	0.97	1.56	AR 282 – Mountainburg	Eastern terminus
1.000 mi = 1.609 km; 1.000 km = 0.621 mi

== See also ==
- List of state highways in Arkansas
