= Cherry Hill, Perry County, Arkansas =

Cherry Hill, Arkansas
- Unincorporated community
- Location within Arkansas Location within the United States
- Coordinates: 34°59′24″N 92°52′28″W
- Country: United States
- State: Arkansas
- County: Perry
- Elevation: 351 ft (107 m)
- Time zone: UTC-6 (Central (CST))
  - Summer (DST): UTC-5 (CDT)
- Area code: 501
- GNIS feature ID: 76599

Cherry Hill (also Brazils Store) is an unincorporated community in Perry County, Arkansas, United States.
