= The Tavern (Little Rock, Arkansas) =

- U.S. National Register of Historic Places
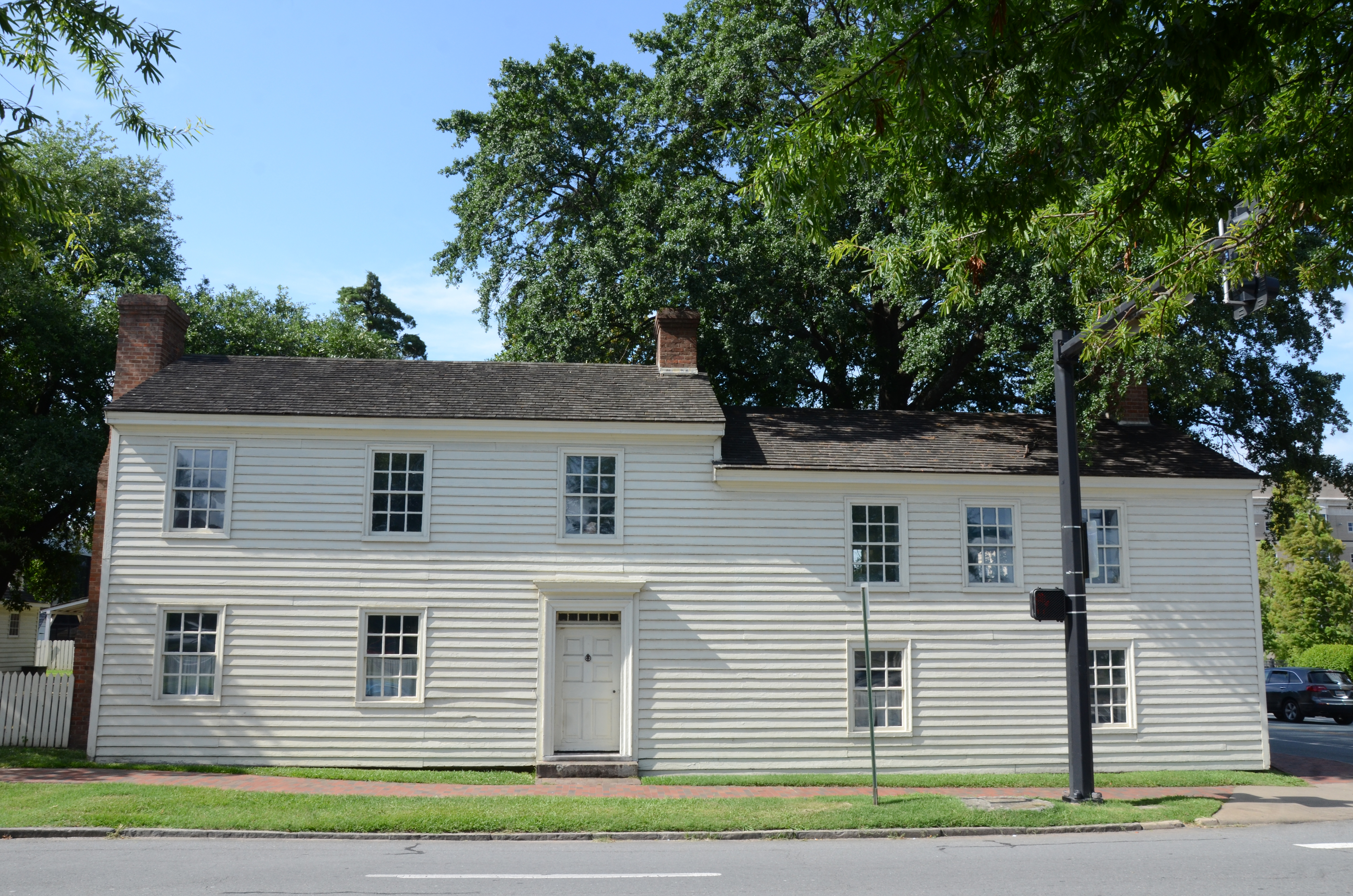

- Location within Arkansas Location within the United States
- Location: 214 E. 3rd St., Little Rock, Arkansas
- Coordinates: 34°44′47″N 92°15′56″W
- Built: 1820
- NRHP reference No.: 70000126
- Added to NRHP: March 05, 1970

The Tavern, also known as the Jesse Hinderliter House, is a historic tavern house at 214 East 3rd Street in Little Rock, Arkansas. It is a two-story log structure, with a gabled roof and clapboarded exterior. Built c. 1820 and enlarged about 1834, it is believed to be the only surviving building in Little Rock from the state's territorial period. Its interior has exposed log beams with beaded corners, and an original hand-carved mantel.

The building was listed on the National Register of Historic Places in 1970.

== See also ==
- National Register of Historic Places listings in Little Rock, Arkansas
