= Perry County, Arkansas =

County in Arkansas, United States

- County
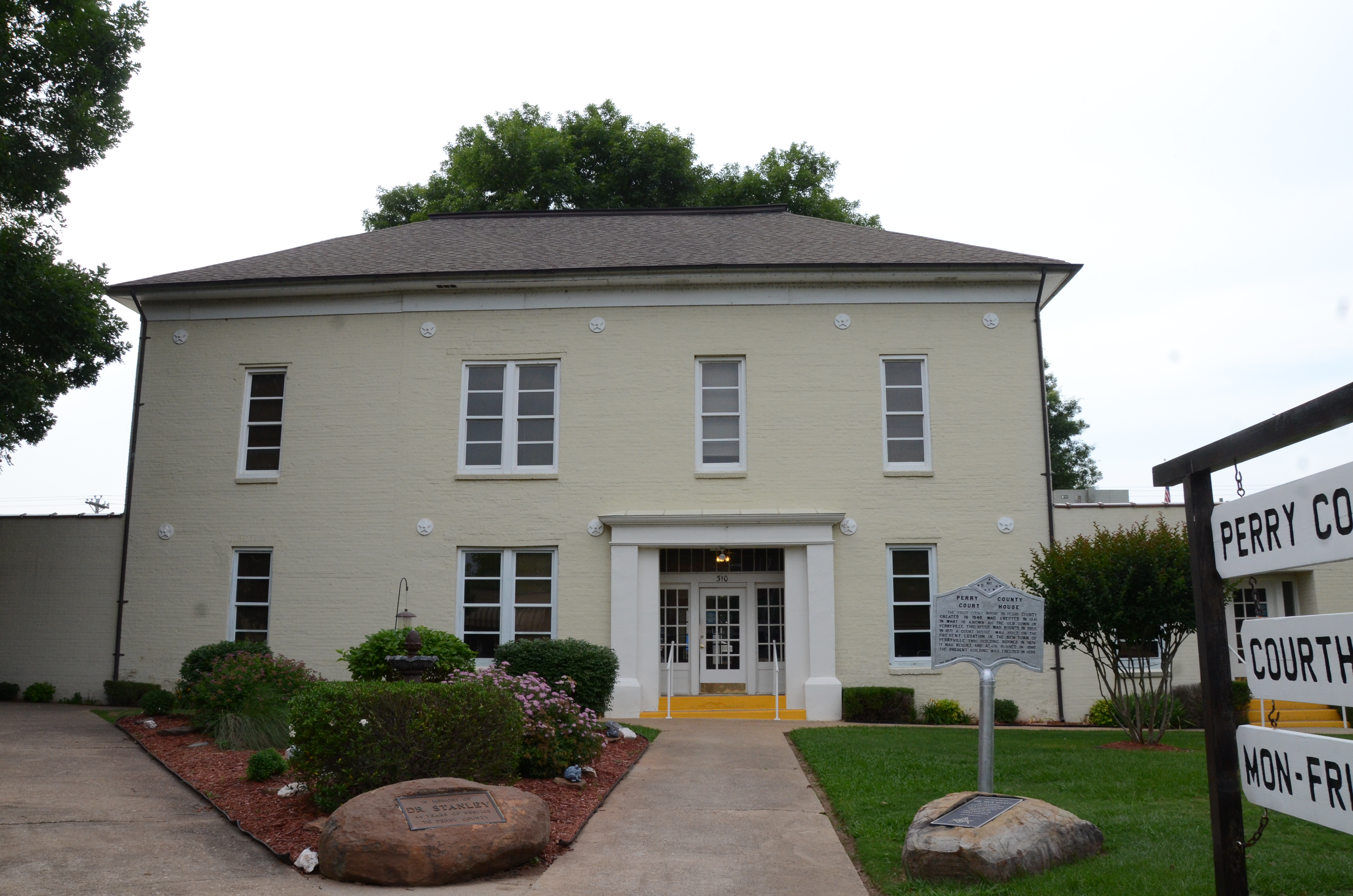
- Perry County Courthouse (Perryville, Arkansas)

- Location within the U.S. state of Arkansas
- Coordinates: 34°57′37″N 92°56′07″W
- Country: United States
- State: Arkansas
- Founded: December 18, 1840
- Named for: Oliver Hazard Perry
- Seat: Perryville
- Largest city: Perryville

Area
  - Total: 561 sq mi (1,450 km^{2})
  - Land: 551 sq mi (1,430 km^{2})
  - Water: 9.1 sq mi (24 km^{2}) 1.6%

Population (2020)
  - Total: 10,019
  - Estimate (2025): 10,309 ▲
  - Density: 18.2/sq mi (7.02/km^{2})
- Time zone: UTC−6 (Central)
  - Summer (DST): UTC−5 (CDT)
- Congressional district: 2nd
- Website: perrycoarkansas.org

Perry County is a county located in the U.S. state of Arkansas. Its population was 10,019 at the 2020 United States census. The county seat is Perryville. The county was formed on December 18, 1840, and named for Commodore Oliver Hazard Perry, naval hero in the War of 1812. It is an alcohol prohibition or dry county.

Perry County is included in the Little Rock-North Little Rock-Conway metropolitan area.

== Geography ==
According to the U.S. Census Bureau, the county has a total area of 561 square miles (1,450 km^{2}), of which 551 square miles (1,430 km^{2}) is land and 9.1 square miles (24 km^{2}) (1.6%) is water. It is the fourth-smallest county in Arkansas by land area and third-smallest by total area.

=== Major highways ===
- Highway 7
- Highway 9
- Highway 10
- Highway 60
- Highway 113
- Highway 155
- Highway 216
- Highway 247
- Highway 300
- Highway 314
- Highway 324

=== Adjacent counties ===
- Conway County (north)
- Faulkner County (northeast)
- Pulaski County (east)
- Saline County (southeast)
- Garland County (southwest)
- Yell County (west)

=== National protected area ===
- Ouachita National Forest (part)

== Demographics ==
Historical population
| Census | Pop. | Note | %± |
|---|---|---|---|
| 1850 | 978 | | — |
| 1860 | 2,465 | | 152.0% |
| 1870 | 2,685 | | 8.9% |
| 1880 | 3,872 | | 44.2% |
| 1890 | 5,538 | | 43.0% |
| 1900 | 7,294 | | 31.7% |
| 1910 | 9,402 | | 28.9% |
| 1920 | 9,905 | | 5.3% |
| 1930 | 7,695 | | −22.3% |
| 1940 | 8,392 | | 9.1% |
| 1950 | 5,978 | | −28.8% |
| 1960 | 4,927 | | −17.6% |
| 1970 | 5,634 | | 14.3% |
| 1980 | 7,266 | | 29.0% |
| 1990 | 7,969 | | 9.7% |
| 2000 | 10,209 | | 28.1% |
| 2010 | 10,445 | | 2.3% |
| 2020 | 10,019 | | −4.1% |
| 2025 (est.) | 10,309 | ▲ | 2.9% |
U.S. Decennial Census; 1790–1960 1900–1990; 1990–2000 2010

=== 2020 census ===
As of the 2020 census, the county had a population of 10,019. The median age was 45.2 years. 21.9% of residents were under the age of 18 and 20.9% of residents were 65 years of age or older. For every 100 females there were 99.4 males, and for every 100 females age 18 and over there were 98.5 males age 18 and over.

The racial makeup of the county was 91.5% White, 1.1% Black or African American, 0.5% American Indian and Alaska Native, 0.1% Asian, <0.1% Native Hawaiian and Pacific Islander, 1.1% from some other race, and 5.7% from two or more races. Hispanic or Latino residents of any race comprised 2.9% of the population.

<0.1% of residents lived in urban areas, while 100.0% lived in rural areas.

There were 4,085 households in the county, of which 28.0% had children under the age of 18 living in them. Of all households, 52.6% were married-couple households, 19.6% were households with a male householder and no spouse or partner present, and 22.2% were households with a female householder and no spouse or partner present. About 27.9% of all households were made up of individuals and 13.4% had someone living alone who was 65 years of age or older.

There were 4,933 housing units, of which 17.2% were vacant. Among occupied housing units, 78.1% were owner-occupied and 21.9% were renter-occupied. The homeowner vacancy rate was 1.7% and the rental vacancy rate was 8.1%.

=== 2000 census ===
As of the 2000 census, there were 10,209 people, 3,989 households, and 2,939 families residing in the county. The population density was 18 people per square mile (6.9 people/km^{2}). There were 4,702 housing units at an average density of 8 units per square mile (3.1 units/km^{2}). The racial makeup of the county was 95.62% White, 1.73% Black or African American, 0.98% Native American, 0.15% Asian, 0.02% Pacific Islander, 0.39% from other races, and 1.11% from two or more races. 1.18% of the population were Hispanic or Latino of any race.

There were 3,989 households, out of which 32.60% had children under the age of 18 living with them, 61.10% were married couples living together, 8.70% had a female householder with no husband present, and 26.30% were non-families. 23.20% of all households were made up of individuals, and 10.40% had someone living alone who was 65 years of age or older. The average household size was 2.52 and the average family size was 2.96.

In the county, the population was spread out, with 25.30% under the age of 18, 7.40% from 18 to 24, 28.00% from 25 to 44, 24.50% from 45 to 64, and 14.80% who were 65 years of age or older. The median age was 38 years. For every 100 females, there were 98.30 males. For every 100 females age 18 and over, there were 96.20 males.

The median income for a household in the county was $31,083, and the median income for a family was $37,170. Males had a median income of $28,254 versus $21,462 for females. The per capita income for the county was $16,216. About 10.50% of families and 14.00% of the population were below the poverty line, including 17.00% of those under age 18 and 15.00% of those age 65 or over.

== Government and politics ==
=== Government ===
The county government is a constitutional body granted specific powers by the Constitution of Arkansas and the Arkansas Code. The quorum court is the legislative branch of the county government and controls all spending and revenue collection. Representatives are called justices of the peace and are elected from county districts every even-numbered year. The number of districts in a county vary from nine to fifteen, and district boundaries are drawn by the county election commission. The Perry County Quorum Court has nine members. Presiding over quorum court meetings is the county judge, who serves as the chief executive officer of the county. The county judge is elected at-large and does not vote in quorum court business, although capable of vetoing quorum court decisions.

Perry County, Arkansas Elected countywide officials
| Position | Officeholder | Party |
|---|---|---|
| County Judge | Larry Blackmon | Republican |
| County/Circuit Clerk | Renee Rainey | Republican |
| Sheriff/Collector | Ricky Don Jones | Republican |
| Treasurer | Jessica Spinks | Republican |
| Assessor | Amanda Hawkins | Republican |
| Coroner | Wes Harris | Republican |

The composition of the Quorum Court following the 2024 elections is 8 Republicans and 1 Democrat. Justices of the Peace (members) of the Quorum Court following the elections are:

- District 1: Travis Bentley (R)
- District 2: Dale Payne (R)
- District 3: Ronnie Lee (R)
- District 4: Shane Treadway (R)
- District 5: Edward Evans (D)
- District 6: Charlie Clements (R)
- District 7: David Hoyt (R)
- District 8: Benjamin D. Lee (R)
- District 9: Scott Skinkle (R)

Additionally, the townships of Perry County are entitled to elect their own respective constables, as set forth by the Constitution of Arkansas. Constables are largely of historical significance as they were used to keep the peace in rural areas when travel was more difficult. The township constables as of the 2024 elections are:

- Houston: Randall E. Luyet (R)
- Perry: Bart Hight (R)

Cherry Hill Township also elects its own committee board. The committee board member at-large is Phylis McMoran (D).

=== Politics ===
Over the past few election cycles Perry County has trended heavily towards the GOP. The last Democrat (as of 2024) to carry this county was Bill Clinton in 1996.

United States presidential election results for Perry County, Arkansas
| Year | Republican | | Democratic | | Third party(ies) | |
| Year | No. | % | No. | % | No. | % |
|---|---|---|---|---|---|---|
| 1896 | 217 | 24.08% | 678 | 75.25% | 6 | 0.67% |
| 1900 | 293 | 38.45% | 459 | 60.24% | 10 | 1.31% |
| 1904 | 356 | 41.40% | 477 | 55.47% | 27 | 3.14% |
| 1908 | 445 | 39.63% | 608 | 54.14% | 70 | 6.23% |
| 1912 | 163 | 16.89% | 522 | 54.09% | 280 | 29.02% |
| 1916 | 439 | 31.05% | 975 | 68.95% | 0 | 0.00% |
| 1920 | 592 | 43.31% | 738 | 53.99% | 37 | 2.71% |
| 1924 | 260 | 32.91% | 386 | 48.86% | 144 | 18.23% |
| 1928 | 474 | 42.59% | 636 | 57.14% | 3 | 0.27% |
| 1932 | 123 | 8.34% | 1,347 | 91.38% | 4 | 0.27% |
| 1936 | 249 | 21.69% | 899 | 78.31% | 0 | 0.00% |
| 1940 | 206 | 20.81% | 783 | 79.09% | 1 | 0.10% |
| 1944 | 285 | 28.64% | 710 | 71.36% | 0 | 0.00% |
| 1948 | 201 | 18.42% | 731 | 67.00% | 159 | 14.57% |
| 1952 | 502 | 38.32% | 802 | 61.22% | 6 | 0.46% |
| 1956 | 572 | 43.87% | 719 | 55.14% | 13 | 1.00% |
| 1960 | 501 | 36.17% | 789 | 56.97% | 95 | 6.86% |
| 1964 | 1,048 | 43.90% | 1,320 | 55.30% | 19 | 0.80% |
| 1968 | 740 | 32.31% | 634 | 27.69% | 916 | 40.00% |
| 1972 | 1,445 | 63.88% | 810 | 35.81% | 7 | 0.31% |
| 1976 | 832 | 26.48% | 2,310 | 73.52% | 0 | 0.00% |
| 1980 | 1,459 | 45.79% | 1,606 | 50.41% | 121 | 3.80% |
| 1984 | 2,047 | 58.82% | 1,404 | 40.34% | 29 | 0.83% |
| 1988 | 1,627 | 52.01% | 1,470 | 46.99% | 31 | 0.99% |
| 1992 | 1,162 | 33.16% | 1,906 | 54.39% | 436 | 12.44% |
| 1996 | 1,143 | 32.83% | 1,873 | 53.79% | 466 | 13.38% |
| 2000 | 2,114 | 52.76% | 1,648 | 41.13% | 245 | 6.11% |
| 2004 | 2,435 | 54.95% | 1,921 | 43.35% | 75 | 1.69% |
| 2008 | 2,743 | 64.10% | 1,352 | 31.60% | 184 | 4.30% |
| 2012 | 2,581 | 65.54% | 1,187 | 30.14% | 170 | 4.32% |
| 2016 | 3,008 | 69.86% | 1,049 | 24.36% | 249 | 5.78% |
| 2020 | 3,479 | 75.19% | 1,012 | 21.87% | 136 | 2.94% |
| 2024 | 3,559 | 77.64% | 923 | 20.14% | 102 | 2.23% |

== Tourism ==
Just west of the Little Rock Metro Area, Perry County is a rural area set in the Ouachita Mountains with much of the county is within the Ouachita National Forest. Multiple points of interest of the National Forest are located within Perry County, to include the Flatside Wilderness Area, the Ouachita National Recreation Trail, Flatside Pinnacle Mountain, Lake Sylvia Recreation Area, the Hollis CCC Camp, the South Fourche Recreation Area and multiple watershed lakes and streams. Other popular outdoor recreation-related points of interest in the county include Nimrod Lake, Harris Brake Lake, Toad Suck Park, the Arkansas River, the Fourche LaFave River, and the South Fourche LaFave River.

For history buffs, the Perry County Museum in Perryville's Historic Commercial District provides several exhibits on the history of Perry County and its communities. The Hollis Country Store in Hollis is a popular roadside stop for travelers on Scenic Highway 7 and listed on the National Register of Historic Places.

Perry County's most popular annual event is the Arkansas Goat Festival held in the Fall drawing thousands of tourists from around the country. Perry County is also the location of Heifer Ranch, an arm of Heifer International, a nonprofit which provides food and agricultural training for people all across the globe.

== Communities ==
=== Cities ===
- Adona
- Perryville (county seat)

=== Towns ===
- Bigelow
- Casa
- Fourche
- Houston
- Perry

=== Census-designated place ===
- Aplin

=== Other unincorporated communities ===
- Ava
- Cherry Hill
- Fourche Junction
- Hollis
- Nimrod
- Toad Suck

=== Townships ===
Townships in Arkansas are the divisions of a county. Each township includes unincorporated areas; some may have incorporated cities or towns within part of their boundaries. Arkansas townships have limited purposes in modern times. However, the United States census does list Arkansas population based on townships (sometimes referred to as "county subdivisions" or "minor civil divisions"). Townships are also of value for historical purposes in terms of genealogical research. Each town or city is within one or more townships in an Arkansas county based on census maps and publications. The townships of Perry County are listed below; listed in parentheses are the cities, towns, and/or census-designated places that are fully or partially inside the township.

- Aplin
- Casa (Casa)
- Cherry Hill
- Fourche Lafavre (most of Perryville)
- Houston (Houston)
- Kenney
- Lake (Perry)
- Maumelle
- New Tennessee
- Perry (Bigelow, Fourche)
- Petit Jean (Adona)
- Rankin
- Rose Creek
- Tyler
- Union
- Union Valley (small part of Perryville)
- Wye

== Notable people ==
- Mary Elizabeth Bentley (born 1961), Republican member of the Arkansas House of Representatives since 2015
- Len E. Blaylock (1918–2012), Republican politician from Nimrod in Perry County
- Bob Dorough (1923–2018), American bebop and jazz pianist most recognizable from Schoolhouse Rock! fame.

== See also ==
- List of lakes in Perry County, Arkansas
- National Register of Historic Places listings in Perry County, Arkansas
