= Lake Maumelle =

Man-made reservoir in Arkansas, United States

- Location within Arkansas
- Coordinates: 34°52′42″N 92°34′0″W
- Basin countries: United States
- Surface area: 8,900 acres (3,600 ha)
- Shore length^{1}: 70 miles (110 km)
- ^{1} Shore length is not a well-defined measure.

Lake Maumelle is a man-made lake in central Arkansas, United States, in Pulaski County, and covers 8,900 acres. It is one of the primary drinking water sources for Little Rock, Arkansas. It is locally popular for boating and fishing.

The lake was created in the late 1950s, with construction beginning in 1956 to dam the Big Maumelle River, and water flowing into the system in 1958.

== See also ==
- List of lakes in Arkansas
