= Roland, Arkansas =

- Census-designated place
- Location of Roland in Pulaski County, Arkansas.

- Location within Arkansas
- Coordinates: 34°54′23″N 92°29′54″W
- Country: United States
- State: Arkansas
- County: Pulaski

Area
  - Total: 8.93 sq mi (23.13 km^{2})
  - Land: 8.07 sq mi (20.90 km^{2})
  - Water: 0.86 sq mi (2.23 km^{2})
- Elevation: 276 ft (84 m)

Population (2020)
  - Total: 820
  - Density: 101.6/sq mi (39.23/km^{2})
- Time zone: UTC-6 (Central (CST))
  - Summer (DST): UTC-5 (CDT)
- Area code: 501
- GNIS feature ID: 2582921

Roland is a census-designated place in Pulaski County, Arkansas, United States. It is part of the Central Arkansas metropolitan area. Per the 2020 census, the population was 820.

Currently it is in the Pulaski County Special School District, and is zoned to Joe T. Robinson Elementary School, Joe T. Robinson Middle School, and Joe T. Robinson High School.

== Demographics ==
=== 2020 census ===
Roland CDP, Arkansas – Racial and ethnic composition Note: the U.S. census treats Hispanic/Latino as an ethnic category. This table excludes Latinos from the racial categories and assigns them to a separate category. Hispanics/Latinos may be of any race.
Race / Ethnicity (NH = Non-Hispanic)	Pop 2010	Pop 2020	% 2010	% 2020
White alone (NH)	653	683	87.53%	83.29%
Black or African American alone (NH)	51	63	6.84%	7.68%
Native American or Alaska Native alone (NH)	5	1	0.67%	0.12%
Asian alone (NH)	2	2	0.27%	0.24%
Pacific Islander alone (NH)	1	0	0.13%	0.00%
Some Other Race alone (NH)	0	0	0.00%	0.00%
Mixed Race or Multi-Racial (NH)	11	48	1.47%	5.85%
Hispanic or Latino (any race)	23	23	3.08%	2.80%
Total	746	820	100.00%	100.00%

Historical population
Census	Pop.	Note	%±
2010	746		—
2020	820		9.9%
U.S. Decennial Census; 2010 2020
