= Perry, Arkansas =

- Town
- Location of Perry in Perry County, Arkansas.
- Coordinates: 35°2′46″N 92°47′43″W
- Country: United States
- State: Arkansas
- County: Perry

Area
  - Total: 0.70 sq mi (1.82 km^{2})
  - Land: 0.70 sq mi (1.82 km^{2})
  - Water: 0 sq mi (0.00 km^{2})
- Elevation: 361 ft (110 m)

Population (2020)
  - Total: 262
  - Estimate (2025): 267 ▲
  - Density: 373.3/sq mi (144.13/km^{2})
- Time zone: UTC-6 (Central (CST))
  - Summer (DST): UTC-5 (CDT)
- ZIP code: 72125
- Area code: 501
- FIPS code: 05-54650
- GNIS feature ID: 2407100

Perry is a town in Perry County, Arkansas, United States. As of the 2020 census, Perry had a population of 262. It is part of the Little Rock–North Little Rock–Conway Metropolitan Statistical Area.

== Geography ==
Perry is located at 35°2′46″N 92°47′43″W (35.046137, -92.795373).

According to the United States Census Bureau, the town has a total area of 1.1 km^{2} (0.4 mi^{2}), all land.

== Demographics ==
Historical population
Census	Pop.	Note	%±
1920	540		—
1930	387		−28.3%
1940	377		−2.6%
1950	284		−24.7%
1960	224		−21.1%
1970	218		−2.7%
1980	254		16.5%
1990	228		−10.2%
2000	314		37.7%
2010	270		−14.0%
2020	262		−3.0%
2025 (est.)	267	▲	1.9%
U.S. Decennial Census

As of the census of 2000, there were 314 people, 119 households, and 89 families residing in the town. The population density was 288.7/km^{2} (742.3/mi^{2}). There were 124 housing units at an average density of 114.0/km^{2} (293.1/mi^{2}). The racial makeup of the town was 97.13% White, 0.32% Native American, 0.32% Asian, 0.32% Pacific Islander, 0.32% from other races, and 1.59% from two or more races. 0.96% of the population were Hispanic or Latino of any race.

There were 119 households, out of which 37.0% had children under the age of 18 living with them, 59.7% were married couples living together, 12.6% had a female householder with no husband present, and 25.2% were non-families. 24.4% of all households were made up of individuals, and 8.4% had someone living alone who was 65 years of age or older. The average household size was 2.64 and the average family size was 3.13.

In the town, the population was spread out, with 26.4% under the age of 18, 9.9% from 18 to 24, 30.9% from 25 to 44, 21.0% from 45 to 64, and 11.8% who were 65 years of age or older. The median age was 36 years. For every 100 females, there were 91.5 males. For every 100 females age 18 and over, there were 87.8 males.

The median income for a household in the town was $31,750, and the median income for a family was $32,500. Males had a median income of $21,339 versus $14,773 for females. The per capita income for the town was $12,803. About 12.0% of families and 12.1% of the population were below the poverty line, including 14.7% of those under age 18 and 10.3% of those age 65 or over.

== Climate ==
The climate in this area is characterized by hot, humid summers and generally mild to cool winters. According to the Köppen Climate Classification system, Perry has a humid subtropical climate, abbreviated "Cfa" on climate maps.

== Education ==
It is a part of the Two Rivers School District, which operates Two Rivers Elementary School and Two Rivers High School.

It was within the Perry-Casa School District until 2004, when it merged into Two Rivers. Perry is 26 miles (42 km) away from Ola, where Perry-Casa schools had been consolidated into.
