= Bigelow, Arkansas =

- Town
- Location of Bigelow in Perry County, Arkansas.
- Coordinates: 34°59′57″N 92°37′52″W
- Country: United States
- State: Arkansas
- County: Perry

Area
  - Total: 0.94 sq mi (2.43 km^{2})
  - Land: 0.94 sq mi (2.43 km^{2})
  - Water: 0 sq mi (0.00 km^{2})
- Elevation: 328 ft (100 m)

Population (2020)
  - Total: 352
  - Estimate (2025): 364 ▲
  - Density: 375.5/sq mi (144.98/km^{2})
- Time zone: UTC-6 (Central (CST))
  - Summer (DST): UTC-5 (CDT)
- ZIP code: 72016
- Area code: 501
- FIPS code: 05-05920
- GNIS feature ID: 2405263

Bigelow is a town in Perry County, Arkansas, United States. Located in Central Arkansas near the confluence of the Fourche La Fave River and Arkansas River, the community was incorporated in 1905 as Esau. Based largely on the timber industry, the town grew until the lumber mills were closed in 1920. The population was 352 at the 2020 census.

== History ==
Bigelow did not exist by its current name until 1911, as it was formerly known as "Esau"—a community a few miles southwest of the present Bridge that grew to border the edge of the small town of Fourche. In 1911, Fourche River Mill owner, N.P. Bigelow, built an elaborate white house of the best lumber on a hill above the town. He was elected mayor, and then gained permission from the state's General Assembly to change the name of Esau to Bigelow. A vote was taken to move the county seat from Perryville to Bigelow, Bigelow won the vote, but the move was never made.

== Geography ==
Bigelow is located at 34°59′57″N 92°37′52″W (34.999061, -92.631203).

According to the United States Census Bureau, the town has a total area of 0.8 square miles (2.1 km^{2}), all land.

== Demographics ==
Historical population
Census	Pop.	Note	%±
1910	292		—
1920	1,589		444.2%
1930	338		−78.7%
1940	170		−49.7%
1950	292		71.8%
1960	231		−20.9%
1970	258		11.7%
1980	373		44.6%
1990	340		−8.8%
2000	329		−3.2%
2010	315		−4.3%
2020	352		11.7%
2025 (est.)	364	▲	3.4%
U.S. Decennial Census; 2014 Estimate

As of the census of 2000, there were 329 people, 127 households, and 91 families residing in the town. The population density was 391.5 inhabitants per square mile (151.2/km^{2}). There were 144 housing units at an average density of 171.3 per square mile (66.1/km^{2}). The racial makeup of the town was 97.57% White, 0.61% Black or African American, 0.91% Native American, 0.61% Asian, and 0.30% from two or more races. 2.43% of the population were Hispanic or Latino of any race.

There were 127 households, out of which 33.9% had children under the age of 18 living with them, 55.9% were married couples living together, 12.6% had a female householder with no husband present, and 27.6% were non-families. 24.4% of all households were made up of individuals, and 16.5% had someone living alone who was 65 years of age or older. The average household size was 2.59 and the average family size was 3.05.

In the town, the population was spread out, with 28.3% under the age of 18, 8.8% from 18 to 24, 27.1% from 25 to 44, 22.2% from 45 to 64, and 13.7% who were 65 years of age or older. The median age was 36 years. For every 100 females, there were 89.1 males. For every 100 females age 18 and over, there were 85.8 males.

The median income for a household in the town was $32,000, and the median income for a family was $47,750. Males had a median income of $27,500 versus $21,429 for females. The per capita income for the town was $16,574. About 11.0% of families and 18.0% of the population were below the poverty line, including 32.1% of those under age 18 and 22.2% of those age 65 or over.

== Education ==
The school district for public education for elementary and secondary school students is the East End School District, which leads to graduation from Bigelow High School.
