= Houston, Arkansas =

- Town
- Location of Houston in Perry County, Arkansas.
- Coordinates: 35°2′0″N 92°41′42″W
- Country: United States
- State: Arkansas
- County: Perry

Area
  - Total: 1.01 sq mi (2.62 km^{2})
  - Land: 1.01 sq mi (2.62 km^{2})
  - Water: 0 sq mi (0.00 km^{2})
- Elevation: 295 ft (90 m)

Population (2020)
  - Total: 143
  - Estimate (2025): 149 ▲
  - Density: 141.3/sq mi (54.54/km^{2})
- Time zone: UTC-6 (Central (CST))
  - Summer (DST): UTC-5 (CDT)
- ZIP code: 72070
- Area code: 501
- FIPS code: 05-33490
- GNIS feature ID: 2405869

Houston is a town in Perry County, Arkansas, United States. The population was 143 at the 2020 census. It is part of the Little Rock–North Little Rock–Conway Metropolitan Statistical Area.

== Geography ==
Houston is located at 35°2′0″N 92°41′42″W (35.033460, -92.694938).

According to the United States Census Bureau, the town has a total area of 2.6 km^{2} (1.0 sq mi), all land.

== Demographics ==
Historical population
Census	Pop.	Note	%±
1920	403		—
1930	345		−14.4%
1940	287		−16.8%
1950	291		1.4%
1960	206		−29.2%
1970	200		−2.9%
1980	183		−8.5%
1990	149		−18.6%
2000	159		6.7%
2010	173		8.8%
2020	143		−17.3%
2025 (est.)	149	▲	4.2%
U.S. Decennial Census

As of the census of 2000, there were 159 people, 74 households, and 48 families residing in the town. The population density was 60.8 people/km^{2} (157 people/mi^{2}). There were 87 housing units at an average density of 33.3 units/km^{2} (86 units/mi^{2}). The racial makeup of the town was 94.97% White, 0.63% Black or African American, 1.26% Native American, and 3.14% from two or more races. 1.26% of the population were Hispanic or Latino of any race.

There were 74 households, out of which 21.6% had children under the age of 18 living with them, 56.8% were married couples living together, 8.1% had a female householder with no husband present, and 33.8% were non-families. 31.1% of all households were made up of individuals, and 12.2% had someone living alone who was 65 years of age or older. The average household size was 2.15 and the average family size was 2.63.

In the town, the population was spread out, with 18.9% under the age of 18, 4.4% from 18 to 24, 32.1% from 25 to 44, 26.4% from 45 to 64, and 18.2% who were 65 years of age or older. The median age was 42 years. For every 100 females, there were 80.7 males. For every 100 females age 18 and over, there were 81.7 males.

The median income for a household in the town was $25,000, and the median income for a family was $33,750. Males had a median income of $26,250 versus $20,000 for females. The per capita income for the town was $17,130. About 5.4% of families and 7.7% of the population were below the poverty line, including none of those under the age of eighteen and 18.8% of those 65 or over.

== Education ==
Early childhood, elementary and secondary school students living within the municipal limits are zoned to East End School District, which leads to graduation from Bigelow High School.
