= Clinton School =

Clinton School may refer to:

- Clinton School of Public Service, a branch of the University of Arkansas
- Clinton High School (disambiguation)
- Clinton School District (disambiguation)
- The Clinton School, a public middle and high school in New York City

== See also ==
- Clinton Public School District, a school district in Mississippi
- List of honors and awards received by Bill Clinton
- List of places named for DeWitt Clinton
