= Welcome, Pope County, Arkansas =

Welcome, Arkansas
- Unincorporated community
- Welcome's position in Arkansas Welcome, Arkansas (the United States)
- Coordinates: 35°26′58″N 92°54′15″W
- Country: United States
- State: Arkansas
- County: Pope
- Township: Griffin
- Elevation: 600 ft (180 m)
- Time zone: UTC-6 (Central (CST))
  - Summer (DST): UTC-5 (CDT)
- ZIP code: 72843
- Area code: 479
- GNIS feature ID: 74044

Welcome is an unincorporated community in Griffin Township of eastern Pope County, Arkansas, United States. It is located at the intersection of Welcome Home Road and Pine Street, southeast of Hector and northwest of Appleton.
