= Arkansas Highway 130 =

State highway in Arkansas County, Arkansas, United States

Highway 130
- Highway 130 in red, Highway 130S in blue

Route information
- Maintained by ArDOT
- Length: 25.262 mi (40.655 km)
- Existed: November 25, 1958–present

Major junctions
- West end: US 79B in Stuttgart
- US 165 in Stuttgart
- East end: AR 1B in DeWitt

Location
- Country: United States
- State: Arkansas
- County: Arkansas

Highway system
- Arkansas Highway System; Interstate; US; State; Business; Spurs; Suffixed; Scenic; Heritage
← AR 129	→ AR 131
← I-30	Hwy 30	→ AR 31

Highway 130 (AR 130, Ark. 130, and Hwy. 130) is an east–west state highway in Arkansas County, Arkansas. Mostly a low-volume, two-lane road, Highway 130 connects the two county seats of Arkansas County, Stuttgart and DeWitt. The highway began as State Road 30, one of the original state highways in 1926 between North Little Rock and DeWitt. It was renumbered to 130 to prevent confusion with Interstate 30 in 1958, and the segment between North Little Rock and Stuttgart was replaced by an extension of US 165 in 1981, producing the current alignment. Highway 130 has one spur route in Almyra, and a former alternate route in DeWitt that was designated but never built. The routes are maintained by the Arkansas Department of Transportation (ArDOT).

== Route description ==
Highway 130 connects Stuttgart and DeWitt, the two county seats of Arkansas County. Despite estimated travel times similar to US 165 between the cities, US 165 receives three times more vehicular traffic as a mainline route across Southeast Arkansas. (Note: Travel times from Stuttgart to DeWitt are based on highway miles from the downtowns of the cities.) The route is a rural, two-lane road its entire length, except near the western terminus in Stuttgart. Highway 130 is entirely within the Grand Prairie, a subset of the Mississippi Alluvial Plain ecoregion known for rice cultivation and duck hunting.

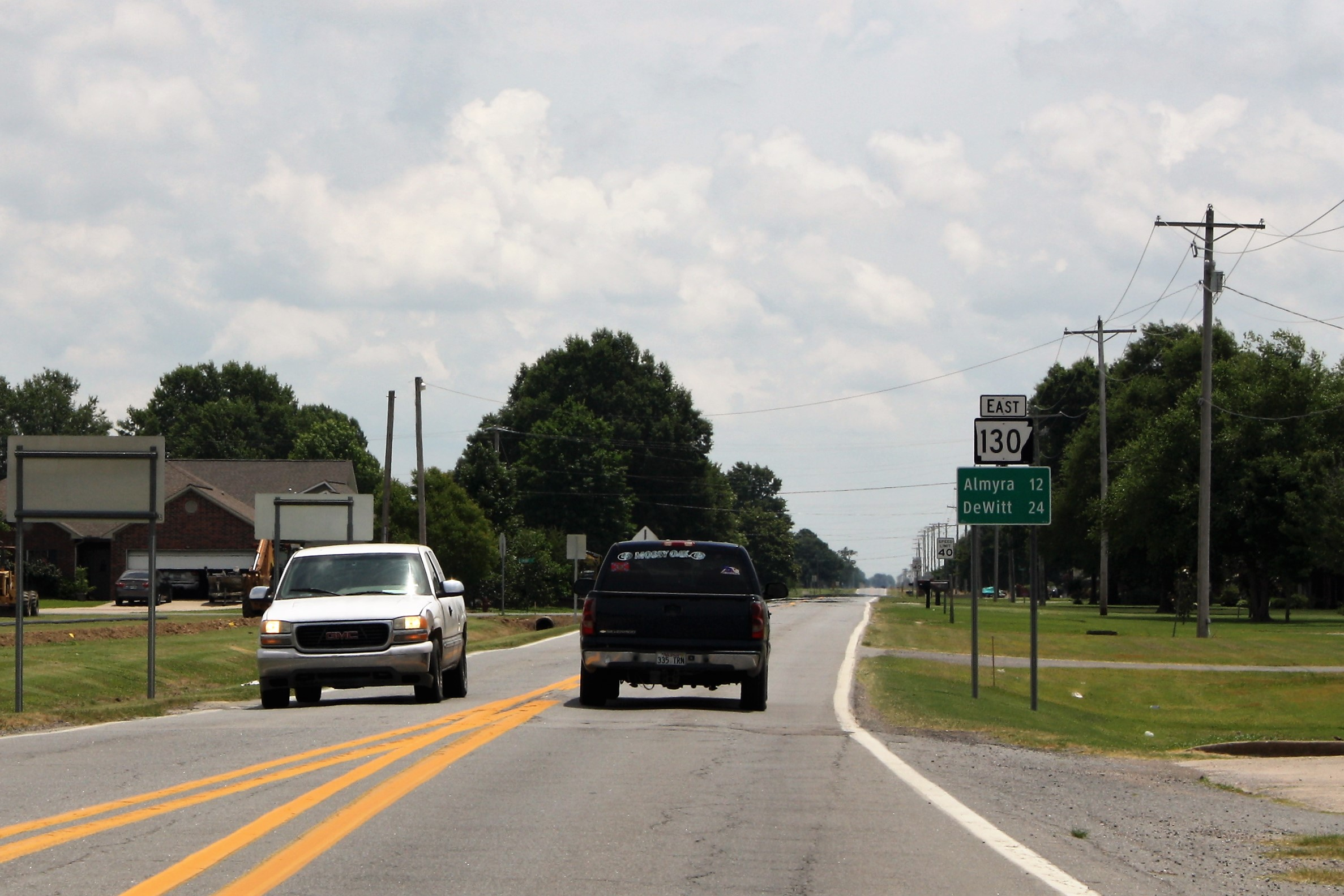
First Highway 130 reassurance marker east of the Park Avenue intersection in Stuttgart

The highway begins as a section line road at US Highway 79 Business (US 79B, 22nd Street) at an intersection with Main Street in southern Stuttgart near Stuttgart High School. Highway 130 continues east through a commercial area as a four lane divided highway with a paved median, crossing a railroad spur before an intersection with US 165 (Park Avenue) near the Riceland Foods headquarters. Continuing east, Highway 130 becomes a two-lane road, passing residential subdivisions and the Stuttgart Country Club before entering an agricultural part of Arkansas County. Near the University of Arkansas System Arkansas Agricultural Experiment Station Rice Research Extension Center and United States Department of Agriculture's and Harry K. Dupree Stuttgart National Aquaculture Research Center, Highway 130 serves as the northern terminus of Highway 153, with Highway 130 turning south toward Almyra.

Highway 130 runs south along a section line to an intersection with Highway 980, which gives access to the Almyra Municipal Airport. Highway 130 continues south along the city limits of Almyra, with Highway 130 Spur running east into town as Main Street. South of Almyra, Highway 130 turns east and crosses Little LaGrue Bayou before a junction with Highway 33. The highway turns south at this junction, continuing south as a section line road and again crossing Little LaGrue Bayou before entering DeWitt.

In DeWitt, Highway 130 runs south as Monroe Street, crossing Holt Branch and running through a residential neighborhood before an intersection with Highway 152 (2nd Street). South of the intersection, Highway 130 passes the L.A. Black Rice Milling Association Inc. Office, which is listed on the National Register of Historic Places (NRHP), and the DeWitt Cemetery before an intersection with Highway 1 Business, where it terminates.

== History ==
State Road 30
- Location: Rose City–Downtown DeWitt
- Existed: April 1, 1926–November 25, 1958

Present-day Highway 130 was created on April 1, 1926, as State Road 30, one of the original Arkansas state highways. It ran from US 70 at Rose City to downtown DeWitt. On November 25, 1958, the route was renumbered to Highway 130 after the American Association of State Highway Officials (AASHTO) designated Interstate 30 in Arkansas. An existing Highway 130 in Van Buren County was renumbered to Highway 330.

In 1963, Highway 1 was rerouted around DeWitt onto a new terrain route. Highway 130 was extended south along Cross Street and Jefferson Street (including part of former Highway 1) south to the new Highway 1. The following year, Highway 130 was rerouted onto Monroe Street south to the current southern terminus at 13th Street. The former alignment was redesignated as Highway 1B south of 2nd Street, and the state highway designation along Maxwell, Adams, Cross, and Jefferson streets north of 2nd Street was deleted.

Highway 130 was realigned south of Almyra in 1968, with part of the former route within Almyra municipal limits becoming Highway 130 Spur.

The route remained unchanged until 1981, when several local officials requested the Arkansas State Highway Commission (ASHC) extend US 165 north to North Little Rock, along several highways, including Highway 130. The ASHC approved the change on March 18, 1981. The designation was approved on October 3, 1981, by the United States Route Number Committee of the AASHTO, truncating Highway 130 to the current northern terminus.

== Major intersections ==
The entire route is in Arkansas County.

Location	mi	km	Destinations	Notes
Stuttgart	0.000	0.000	US 79B (22nd Street) / Main Street	Western terminus, roadway continues west as 22nd Street
Stuttgart	0.698	1.123	US 165 south (Park Avenue) – Lodges Corner, Phillips Community College	
	7.823	12.590	AR 153 south – Crocketts Bluff	AR 153 northern terminus
	11.914	19.174	AR 980 west (Almyra Airport Road)	AR 980 eastern terminus
Almyra	12.636	20.336	AR 130S east (Main Street)	AR 130S western terminus
	17.926	28.849	AR 33 north	AR 33 southern terminus
DeWitt	24.508	39.442	AR 152 east (2nd Street) – St. Charles, Stuttgart	
DeWitt	31.93	51.39	AR 1B (13th Street / Monroe Street)	Eastern terminus
1.000 mi = 1.609 km; 1.000 km = 0.621 mi

== Almyra spur ==
Highway 130S
- Location: Almyra
- Length: 0.714 mi (1,149 m)
- Existed: October 23, 1968–present

Highway 130S (AR 130S, Ark. 130S, and Hwy. 130S) is a spur route in Almyra, Arkansas. Created in 1968 from a former alignment of the parent route, the highway alignment has remained unchanged since creation.

Route description
The highway runs east from the parent route as Main Street, passing the Almyra City Hall at Elizabeth Street. Highway 130S continues east past residences and churches, turning south and the post office onto Columbia Street. State maintenance ends at a t-intersection with 14th Street, an unpaved road along the southern town limits.

Major intersections
The entire route is in Almyra, Arkansas County.

mi	km	Destinations	Notes
0.000	0.000	AR 130 – DeWitt, Stuttgart	Western terminus
0.714	1.149	14th Street	Eastern terminus
1.000 mi = 1.609 km; 1.000 km = 0.621 mi

== Former routes ==
=== Desha County ===
State Road 130
- Location: Desha County
- Length: 8 mi (13 km)
- Existed: c. 1927–c. 1929

State Road 130 is a former state highway from US 65 at Tillar to State Road 1 at McArthur. Today, the unpaved road is known as McArthur Road, and is maintained by the Desha County Road Department.

History
It was first shown on the 1927 state highway map as State Road 116, but was renumbered to State Road 130 by the May 1, 1928 map. The highway was deleted from the state highway system by the May 1929 map.

Major intersections
The entire route was in Desha County.

Location	mi	km	Destinations	Notes
Tillar	0	0.0	US 65	Western terminus
McArthur	8	13	AR 1	Eastern terminus
1.000 mi = 1.609 km; 1.000 km = 0.621 mi

=== Choctaw ===
State Road 130
- Location: Choctaw
- Existed: c. 1937–November 25, 1958

State Road 130 is a former state highway from State Road 9/US Highway 65 to Choctaw.

It was first shown on the 1937 map between present-day Old Highway 9 and Choctaw. In 1953, the segment west of US 65 was redesignated as Highway 9, trimming the route to approximately 1 mile (1.6 km). The road was renumbered to Highway 330 on November 25, 1958, as part of a statewide renumbering to avoid duplication with the newly designated Interstate highways. At the same time, Highway 30 was renumbered to Arkansas Highway 130 to make way for Interstate 30.

=== DeWitt alternate route ===
Highway 130A
- Location: DeWitt
- Length: 1.25 mi (2.01 km)
- Existed: March 28, 1973–March 3, 2004

Highway 130A (AR 130A, Ark. 130A, and Hwy. 130A) is a former planned state highway alternate route in DeWitt, Arkansas. The highway was designated by the Highway Commission in 1973, but was never built, and approval was rescinded in 2004.

History
In 1973, the Arkansas General Assembly passed Act 9 of 1973. The act directed county judges and legislators to designate up to 12 miles (19 km) of county roads as state highways in each county. Highway 130A was designated during this period of state highways system expansion, but the route was never built. The approval was rescinded in 2004.

Major intersections
The entire route was in Arkansas County.

Location	mi	km	Destinations	Notes
	0.00	0.00	AR 130 – DeWitt, Stuttgart	Northern terminus
DeWitt	1.25	2.01	AR 152 (Haliburton Avenue)	Southern terminus
1.000 mi = 1.609 km; 1.000 km = 0.621 mi

== Sources ==
- "Minutes of the Meeting of the Arkansas State Highway Commission" (PDF). Little Rock: Arkansas State Highway Commission. 1953–1969. OCLC 21798861. Archived from the original (PDF) on October 1, 2018.
- "Minutes of the Meeting of the Arkansas State Highway Commission" (PDF). Little Rock: Arkansas State Highway Commission. 1970–1979. OCLC 21798861. Archived from the original (PDF) on November 5, 2011.
- "Minutes of the Meeting of the Arkansas State Highway Commission" (PDF). Little Rock: Arkansas State Highway Commission. 1980–1989. OCLC 21798861.
- "Minutes of the Meeting of the Arkansas State Highway Commission" (PDF). Little Rock: Arkansas State Highway Commission. 1990–1999. OCLC 21798861. Archived from the original (PDF) on July 21, 2019.
- "Minutes of the Meeting of the Arkansas State Highway Commission" (PDF). Little Rock: Arkansas State Highway Commission. 2000–2009. OCLC 21798861.
- "Minutes of the Meeting of the Arkansas State Highway Commission" (PDF). Little Rock: Arkansas State Highway Commission. 2010–2019. OCLC 21798861. Archived from the original (PDF) on March 4, 2016.
