= Clinton High School =

Clinton High School may refer to:

- Clinton High School (Arkansas), Clinton, Arkansas
- Clinton High School (Clinton, Illinois)
- Clinton High School (Iowa), Clinton, Iowa
- Clinton County High School, Albany, Kentucky
- Clinton High School, Clinton, Louisiana
- Clinton High School (Massachusetts), Clinton, Massachusetts
- Clinton-Graceville-Beardsley High School, Graceville, Minnesota
- Clinton High School (Clinton, Mississippi)
- Clinton High School, Clinton School District (Missouri), Clinton, Missouri
- Clinton High School (Clinton, New York)
- DeWitt Clinton High School, Bronx, New York City, New York
- Clinton High School, Clinton, Sampson County, North Carolina
- Clinton-Massie High School, Clarksville, Ohio
- East Clinton High School, Lees Creek, Ohio
- Port Clinton High School, Port Clinton, Ohio
- Clinton High School (Clinton, Oklahoma)
- Clinton High School (South Carolina), Clinton, South Carolina
- Clinton High School (Clinton, Tennessee)
- Clinton High School (Clinton, Wisconsin)

== See also ==
- Clinton School (disambiguation)
