= Amber Straughn =

American astrophysicist

Amber Nicole Straughn
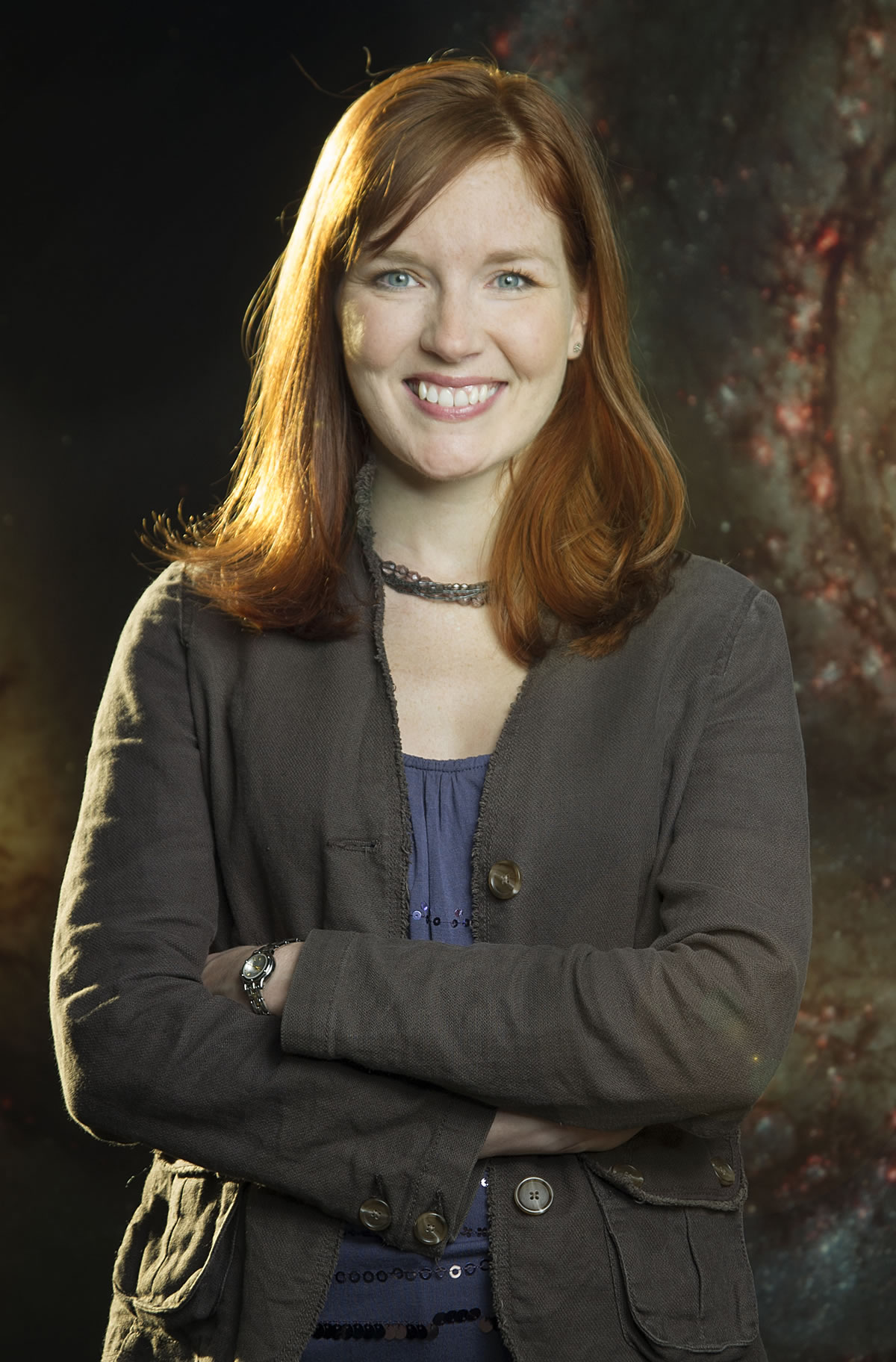
- Straughn in 2014
- Born: 1979 (age 46–47); Bee Branch, Arkansas, U.S.
- Education: University of Arkansas (BS); Arizona State University (MS, PhD)
- Known for: James Webb Space Telescope
- Scientific career
- Fields: Astrophysics, galaxy evolution
- Workplaces: NASA Goddard Space Flight Center
- Thesis: Tracing galaxy assembly: A study of merging and emission-line galaxies (2008)
- Doctoral advisor: Rogier Windhorst
- Website: www.amberstraughn.com

Amber Nicole Straughn (born 1979) is an American astrophysicist at NASA's Goddard Space Flight Center. She serves as deputy project scientist for James Webb Space Telescope science communications and as associate director of the Astrophysics Science Division. Her research focuses on galaxy formation and evolution, particularly star-forming and interacting galaxies.

== Early life and education ==
Straughn grew up on a cattle and pig farm in Bee Branch, Arkansas. The dark rural skies sparked an early interest in astronomy. She was inspired to pursue a career in space science after watching coverage of the Hubble Space Telescope launch in 1990.

Regarding her educational background, Straughn graduated from South Side High School in 1998 and became the first person in her family to attend college. She earned a Bachelor of Science degree in physics from the University of Arkansas in 2002 on a merit scholarship. As an undergraduate, she participated in research aboard NASA's KC-135 reduced-gravity aircraft.

Straughn pursued graduate studies at Arizona State University under Rogier Windhorst. She received a NASA Harriett Jenkins Predoctoral Fellowship in 2005, a three-year award supporting underrepresented groups in STEM fields. After that, she earned her PhD in physics in 2008 with a dissertation on galaxy evolution using Hubble Space Telescope data.

== Career ==
Straughn joined NASA Goddard Space Flight Center as a postdoctoral researcher in 2008 and became deputy project scientist for JWST Science Communications in 2011. In this role, she leads efforts to communicate the telescope's scientific discoveries to the public and media.

Her research has contributed to understanding distant galaxies in the early universe. As an early user of the Wide Field Camera 3 installed on Hubble in 2009, Straughn demonstrated its capability to measure distances and properties of faint galaxies. She is a co-investigator on the Cosmic Assembly Near-infrared Deep Extragalactic Legacy Survey (CANDELS), the largest galaxy survey conducted with Hubble.

=== Science communication ===
Straughn is an active science communicator, speaking at schools, museums, astronomy clubs, and research institutions. She has appeared on PBS's NOVA, Netflix, National Geographic, Discovery Channel, History Channel, and Science Channel. She also appeared on Late Night with Jimmy Fallon in the "Hubble Gotcha" segment. Straughn has given a TEDx talk on the James Webb Space Telescope.

== Awards and honors ==
- 2004: Gerald A. Soffen Memorial Fund Award
- 2005: NASA Harriett G. Jenkins Predoctoral Fellowship
- 2007: American Astronomical Society Chambliss Student Achievement Award
- 2016: NASA Exceptional Achievement Medal
- 2017: University of Arkansas Distinguished Alumni Award

== Personal life ==
Straughn is married to Matt Straughn, whom she met at the University of Arkansas. She became a licensed pilot in 2013 and flies a Cessna 182 Skylane. Additionally, she is also a certified yoga instructor.
