= Pleasant Grove, Arkansas =

Pleasant Grove, Arkansas may refer to the following communities:

- Pleasant Grove, Craighead County, Arkansas, in Craighead County, Arkansas
- Pleasant Grove, Stone County, Arkansas
- Pleasant Grove, Union County, Arkansas
- Pleasant Grove, Van Buren County, Arkansas
- Pleasant Grove, Woodruff County, Arkansas
