= Clinton School District =

Clinton School District, Clinton Community School District, or Clinton Schools may refer to:

- Clinton School District (Arkansas) based in Clinton, Arkansas.
- Clinton Community School District (Iowa)
- Clinton School District (Michigan) (defunct) based in Royal Oak Township, Michigan.
- Clinton School District (Missouri) based in Clinton, Missouri.
- Clinton Community School District (Wisconsin)
- Clinton Public School District (Mississippi)
