= Southside, Arkansas =

Southside, Arkansas may refer to:

- Southside, Independence County, Arkansas, a city in Independence County
- Southside, Van Buren County, Arkansas, an unincorporated community in Van Buren County
