= Jeff McKnight =

American baseball player (1963–2015)

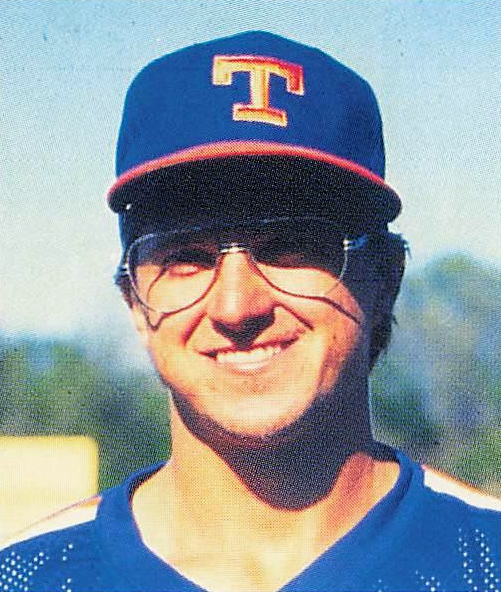
- McKnight with the Tidewater Tides c. 1988
- Utility player
- Born: February 18, 1963; Conway, Arkansas, U.S.
- Died: March 1, 2015 (aged 52); Bee Branch, Arkansas, U.S.
- Batted: Switch Threw: Right

MLB debut
- June 6, 1989, for the New York Mets

Last MLB appearance
- August 11, 1994, for the New York Mets

MLB statistics
- Batting average: .254
- Home runs: 12
- Runs batted in: 68
- Stats at Baseball Reference

Teams
- New York Mets (1989, 1992–1994); Baltimore Orioles (1990–1991)

Jefferson Alan McKnight (February 18, 1963 – March 1, 2015) was an American utility man in Major League Baseball who played for the New York Mets and Baltimore Orioles in parts of six seasons spanning 1989–1994. McKnight was able to play all positions except center field and pitcher, making the largest number of appearances as a first baseman with 39. He was the son of former major league player Jim McKnight.

McKnight starred in high school baseball and basketball at Southside-Bee Branch High School. He played college baseball at Westark Community College, which later became the University of Arkansas-Fort Smith.

McKnight's professional career overall spanned 16 years. Originally drafted by the Mets in 1983, he finished his career in 1998 with the independent Newark Bears. He batted .171 in 16 appearances with the Orioles and .383 in 22 games for the Rochester Red Wings during the 1991 season before his release on October 16 of that year.

He died in 2015 at the age of 52 due to leukemia, a disease he was battling for 10 years.

== See also ==
- List of second-generation Major League Baseball players
