= Clinton High School (Arkansas) =

Location
- 489 Yellowjacket Lane; Clinton, Arkansas 72031; United States
- Coordinates: 35°35′15″N 92°27′35″W

Information
- School type: Public
- School board: Clinton School District
- NCES District ID: 0504410
- CEEB code: 040470
- NCES School ID: 050441000172
- Grades: 10–12
- Enrollment: 418 (2023-2024)
- Student to teacher ratio: 8.25
- Colors: Black and gold
- Mascot: Yellowjacket
- Team name: Clinton Yellowjackets
- Accreditations: ADE; AdvancED (1962–)
- Affiliation: Arkansas Activities Association
- Website: clintonsd.org

Clinton High School is a comprehensive public high school in Clinton, Arkansas, United States that serves grades 10 through 12. It is one of three public high schools in Van Buren County and the only high school managed by the Clinton School District.

The school, as the only high school of its district, serves Clinton, most of Dennard, Scotland, and Alread.

== History ==
Beginning in the 2005-06 school year, the former high school components of the K-12 schools in Alread and Scotland merged into Clinton High School. The respective school districts, Alread School District and Scotland School District, had consolidated the previous year.

== Academics ==
The assumed course of study is the Smart Core curriculum developed by the Arkansas Department of Education. Students may engage in regular and Advanced Placement (AP) coursework and exams that provide an opportunity for college credit prior to graduation. Clinton High School is accredited by ADE.The school also has a very good alternative learning environment program (ALE) for grades 8-12 put on by arch ford that is across the street from the main high school building it is a smaller setting and more 1 on 1 with its students.

== Culture ==
In 2023 Monica Potts wrote in The Atlantic that within the school community, "everyone knows everything about everyone else, or seems to".

== Extracurricular activities ==
The Clinton High School mascot is the Yellowjacket with school colors of black and gold.

=== Athletics ===
For 2012–14, the Clinton Yellowjackets participate in the 4A Classification from the 4A Region 2 Conference for interscholastic activities administered by the Arkansas Activities Association including football, baseball, basketball (boys/girls), cheer, dance, cross country, golf (boys/girls), softball, and track and field.

The Clinton High boys' basketball team won the state championship in 1953. The Clinton High girls' basketball team won were state champions in 1983. Clinton won state in baseball in 1991.

== Notable alumni ==
The number in parentheses indicates the year of graduation.

- Karen R. Baker (1981)-Elected to the Arkansas State Supreme Court in 2010.
- John Hargis (1992)—Olympic Gold Medalist; swimmer and swim coach.
- Glenna Sue Kidd (1950)-professional women's baseball player
