= Choctaw, Arkansas =

- Unincorporated community
- Location within Arkansas Location within the United States
- Coordinates: 35°31′39″N 92°26′24″W
- Country: United States
- State: Arkansas
- County: Van Buren
- Elevation: 548 ft (167 m)
- Time zone: UTC-6 (Central (CST))
  - Summer (DST): UTC-5 (CDT)
- ZIP code: 72028
- Area code: 501
- GNIS feature ID: 57548

Choctaw is an unincorporated community in Van Buren County, Arkansas, United States. Choctaw is located at the junction of U.S. Route 65, Arkansas Highway 9, and Arkansas Highway 330, 4.5 miles (7.2 km) south-southeast of downtown Clinton. Choctaw has a post office with ZIP code 72028.

There was a previous location of the community, called "Old Choctaw" and people moved to a new area, "New Choctaw," after the former area was filled with water in the 1960s.

== Education ==
In 1952, "Old Choctaw" was in the Clinton School District.

As of 2020, "New Choctaw" was in the Clinton School District. Clinton High School is the zoned comprehensive high school of that district.

== Notable people ==
- Bill Bradford, Major League Baseball pitcher
- Glenna Sue Kidd, All-American Girls Professional Baseball League pitcher She is from "Old Choctaw".
