= Scotland, Arkansas =

- Unincorporated community
- Location within Arkansas Location within the United States
- Coordinates: 35°31′39″N 92°36′43″W
- Country: United States
- State: Arkansas
- County: Van Buren
- Elevation: 659 ft (201 m)
- Time zone: UTC-6 (Central (CST))
  - Summer (DST): UTC-5 (CDT)
- ZIP code: 72141
- GNIS feature ID: 58594

Scotland is an unincorporated community in southwestern Van Buren County, Arkansas, United States, near the head of the South Fork of the Little Red River. In April 2010, a tornado struck this community which resulted in extreme damage.

== Education ==
Public education for elementary and secondary school students is provided by the Clinton School District, which leads students to graduate from Clinton High School.

Scotland was a part of the Scotland School District until July 1, 2004, when that district consolidated with the Alread School District into the existing Clinton school district.
