= SSAA =

SSAA may refer to:

- Sporting Shooters Association of Australia
- SSAA choir, vocal music for soprano, soprano, alto and alto parts
- Supersampling anti-aliasing, a spatial anti-aliasing method
