= Arkansas Highway 254 =

State highway in Arkansas, United States

Highway 254
- AR 254 highlighted in red

Route information
- Maintained by ArDOT
- Length: 20.68 mi (33.28 km)
- Existed: 1958–present

Major junctions
- West end: AR 27
- East end: US 65 at Dennard

Location
- Country: United States
- State: Arkansas
- Counties: Van Buren, Searcy

Highway system
- Arkansas Highway System; Interstate; US; State; Business; Spurs; Suffixed; Scenic; Heritage
← AR 253	→ AR 255

Highway 254 (AR 254, Ark. 254, and Hwy. 254) is an east–west state highway in Van Buren County and Searcy County. The route of 20.68 miles (33.28 km) runs from Highway 27 east to US Route 65 (US 65) at Dennard.

== Route description ==
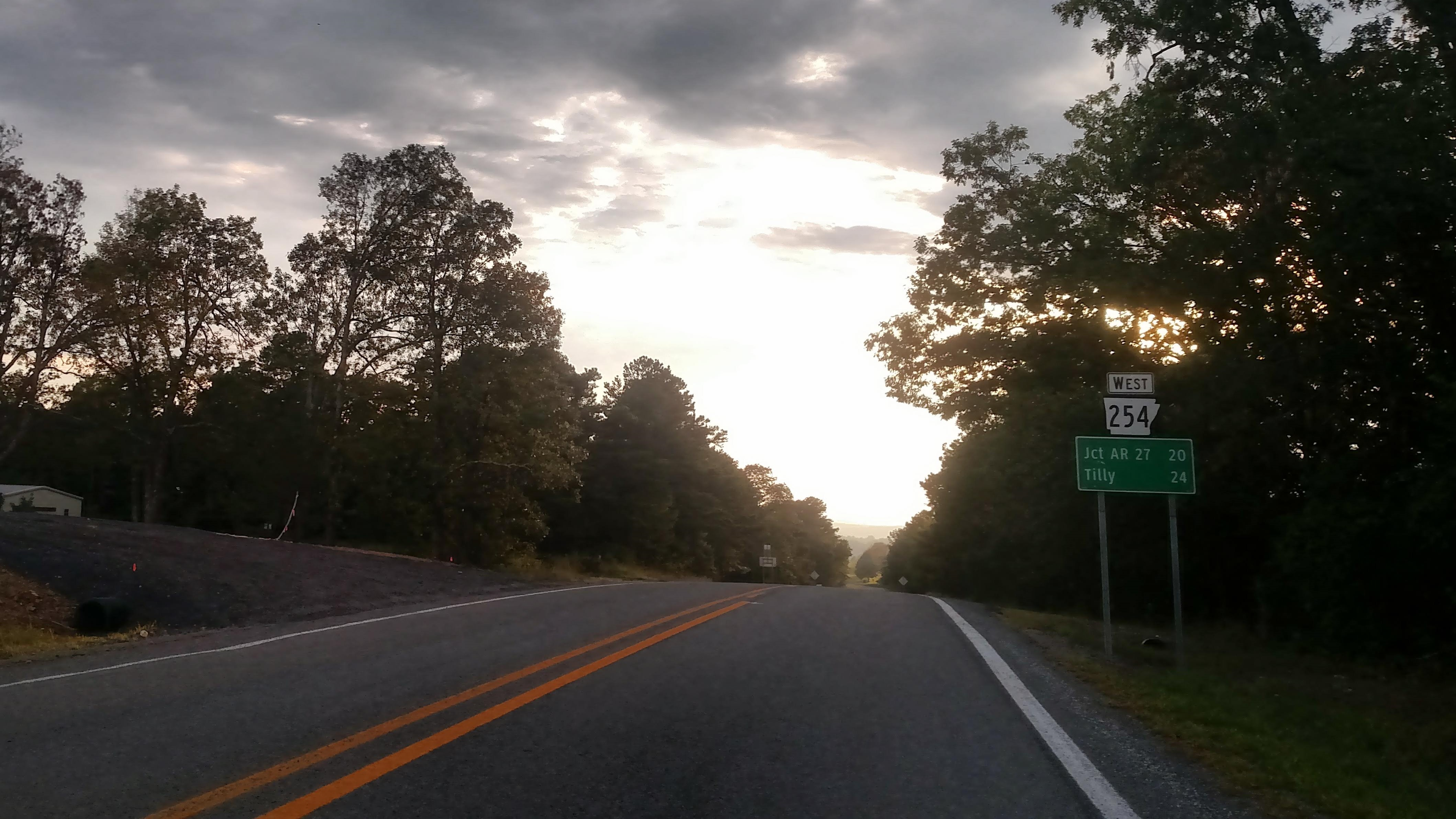
Near the eastern terminus at Dennard

Highway 254 begins at Highway 27 in rural parts of northwestern Van Buren County. The route winds north through hills and farmland to enter Searcy County, then heads east to re-enter Van Buren County. The route terminates at US 65 at Dennard. The route does not cross any other state highways.

== History ==
The route first appears on the state highway map in January 1959 as a 5-mile (8.0 km) unpaved road shooting west from Dennard. The road was later extended east through Booster and south to Highway 16 in 1967. Highway 254 was rerouted along the current alignment around 1981.

== Major intersections ==
County	Location	mi	km	Destinations	Notes
Van Buren		0.00	0.00	AR 27 – Tilly, Canaan, Marshall	Western terminus
Searcy	No major junctions				
Van Buren	Dennard	20.68	33.28	US 65 – Marshall, Clinton	Eastern terminus
1.000 mi = 1.609 km; 1.000 km = 0.621 mi
