= Jim McKnight =

American baseball player (1936–1994)

- Pinch hitter / Third baseman / Outfielder
- Born: June 1, 1936; Bee Branch, Arkansas, U.S.
- Died: February 24, 1994 (aged 57); Van Buren County, Arkansas, U.S.
- Batted: Right Threw: Right

MLB debut
- September 22, 1960, for the Chicago Cubs

Last MLB appearance
- September 9, 1962, for the Chicago Cubs

MLB statistics
- Batting average: .231
- Home runs: 0
- Runs batted in: 6
- Stats at Baseball Reference

Teams
- Chicago Cubs (1960; 1962)

James Arthur McKnight (June 1, 1936 – February 24, 1994) was an American professional baseball player whose career lasted for 18 seasons (1955–1972).

He appeared in 63 games in Major League Baseball as a third baseman, outfielder and pinch hitter in 1960 and 1962 for the Chicago Cubs.

McKnight threw and batted right-handed, stood 6 feet 1 inch (1.85 m) tall and weighed 185 pounds (84 kg).

The native of Bee Branch, Arkansas, signed with the St. Louis Cardinals in 1955 and spent 5 1/2 seasons in the Cardinals' farm system without getting into an MLB game. On June 15, 1960, he was traded by St. Louis to the Cubs for veteran outfielder Walt Moryn. After spending much of the rest of the season with the Cubs' Houston Buffs Triple-A affiliate, he made his Major League Baseball debut in September, going 2-for-6 in three games. McKnight returned to the Buffs in 1961 and set personal bests for home runs (24) and runs batted in (102), then spent the entire 1962 on the roster of the MLB Cubs. In 60 games that season, 50 as a pinch hitter, McKnight collected 19 hits, including one triple, with six runs scored and five runs batted in.

He was traded to the Milwaukee Braves during the off-season, and spent ten additional seasons in minor league baseball, including six with the Phoenix Giants of the Pacific Coast League.

In 1972, he managed the Decatur Commodores of the Class A Midwest League and appeared in seven games as an active player.

All told, Jim McKnight appeared in 1,954 games as a minor leaguer.

McKnight died in an automobile accident at age 57 in Van Buren County, Arkansas.

His son Jeff McKnight was also a Major League Baseball player, an infielder who played in 218 MLB games for the New York Mets and Baltimore Orioles over six seasons (1989–1994), dying at age 52 on March 1, 2015, after suffering from leukemia for a number of years.
