= Sulphur Springs, Van Buren County, Arkansas =

Unincorporated community in Van Bruen County, Arkansas, United States

Sulphur Springs, Arkansas
- Unincorporated community
- Location within Arkansas Location within the United States
- Coordinates: 35°29′30″N 92°17′49″W
- Country: United States
- State: Arkansas
- County: Van Buren
- Elevation: 738 ft (225 m)
- Time zone: UTC-6 (Central (CST))
  - Summer (DST): UTC-5 (CDT)
- Area code: 501
- GNIS feature ID: 68703

Sulphur Springs is an unincorporated community in Van Buren County, Arkansas, United States. Sulphur Springs, which was formerly named Morganton, is located near Arkansas Highway 92, 11.5 miles (18.5 km) southeast of Clinton.
