= Hector School District =

School district in Arkansas, United States

Address
- 11520 State Route 27 Hector, Arkansas, 72843; United States

District information
- Type: Public
- Grades: K–12
- NCES District ID: 0507620

Students and staff
- Students: 623
- Teachers: 77.34
- Staff: 57.5
- Student–teacher ratio: 8.06

Other information
- Website: www.hectorschools.net

Hector School District 59 is a public school district in Hector, Pope County, Arkansas.

Most of the district is in Pope County, where it includes Hector and Appleton. A portion of the district extends into Searcy County.

After the Alread School District consolidated into the Clinton School District in 2004, the Alread middle and high school divisions closed in 2005 and the Alread elementary school division closed in 2006. As a result, an arrangement was set up to where people in the westernmost part of the former Alread school district could instead attend school in the Hector School District as they were closer to Hector than Clinton.

== Schools ==
- Hector Elementary School, serving kindergarten through grade 6
- Hector High School, serving grades 7 through 12.
