= Stumptoe, Arkansas =

- Unincorporated community
- Location within Arkansas Location within the United States
- Coordinates: 35°27′57″N 92°49′48″W
- Country: United States
- State: Arkansas
- County: Van Buren
- Elevation: 1,066 ft (325 m)
- Time zone: UTC-6 (Central (CST))
  - Summer (DST): UTC-5 (CDT)
- GNIS feature ID: 73744

Stumptoe is an unincorporated community in Van Buren County, Arkansas, United States.
