= Clinton High School (Clinton, Mississippi) =

Coordinates: 32°20′38″N 90°18′46″W

Location
- 401 Arrow Drive; Clinton, Mississippi; United States

Information
- Motto: Where Excellence is the ONLY Option
- School district: Clinton Public School District
- Superintendent: Andy Schoggin
- Principal: Brian Fortenberry
- Teaching staff: 64.72 (FTE)
- Grades: 10–12
- Enrollment: 1,290 (2023–24)
- Student to teacher ratio: 19.93
- Colors: Red, white and black
- Mascot: Arrows
- Newspaper: The Arrow Appeal
- Website: https://www.clintonpublicschools.com/schools/clinton-high-school

Clinton High School is a suburban public high school located in Clinton, Mississippi, United States, serving grades 10–12.

== Demographics ==
Clinton High School enrolls approximately 1,290 students per year in grades 10–12. It is a separate campus from the Clinton school district's ninth-grade campus, Sumner Hill, which enrolls an additional 350 students. Demographic information about CHS and other schools throughout the Clinton Public School District is posted annually on the Mississippi Department of Education Web site.

== Academics ==
=== AP Courses Offered ===
- AP Calculus
- AP Biology
- AP English III (Language)
- AP English IV (Literature)
- AP Chemistry
- AP European History
- AP Macroeconomics
- AP United States History
- AP United States Government

== Clubs and Organizations ==
Clinton High School offers a variety of clubs and organizations that cater to the students' diverse needs.

=== Attaché Show Choir ===
Since 1992, the Attaché show choir has competed in 94 competitions across the United States. In that time they have been named Grand Champion 85 times at 34 different venues in 12 different states. In the same time, Attaché has finished in 2nd place seven (7) times, 3rd place once (1), and 4th place once (1). As of March 12, 2022, Attaché has broken its previous record of 22 consecutive grand championships (2001-2008) while competing against elite groups across the nation. Attaché currently holds the longest winning streak in the history of show choir (2014–Present) at 23 consecutive grand championships. It has on multiple occasions been ranked the No. 1 show choir in America by the Show Choir Ranking System. Attaché also has been the host of Show Choir Nationals in Nashville, TN for 20 straight years.

=== Arrow Singers ===
Clinton's Arrow Singers is an all-superior rated choral program. The Arrow Singers consist of seven choirs:

- On-core- TTBB pop a capella choir
- Arrow401 – SSAA pop a capella choir
- Vocalise- SSAA beginner choir
- Belles Voix – SSAA beginner choir
- Vivace – SSAA advanced choir
- Varsity Men – TTBB choir
- Colla Voce – SATB choir

Arrow Singers frequently perform with Distinguished Concerts International New York. In both 2016 and 2025, they performed at Carnegie Hall. In 2018, they performed at Lincoln Center.

=== Clinton Arrow Bands ===
==== Ensembles ====
- Color Guard
- Indoor Percussion
- Marching Band
- Concert Band
- Jazz Band

== Athletics ==
Clinton Arrows participate in the following sports:

- Baseball
- Basketball – Boys
- Basketball – Girls
- Bowling
- Cheerleaders
- Cross Country
- Fastpitch softball
- Football
- Golf
- Powerlifting
- Slowpitch softball
- Soccer – Boys
- Soccer – Girls
- Swimming
- Tennis
- Track
- Volleyball

=== Championships and awards ===
- Clinton High School was designated as a National Blue Ribbon School in 1982–1983.
- Clinton High School was one of only 50 in the nation to earn a Siemens Foundation Award for Advanced Placement in 2009, for the high quality of its college prep courses and instructors.

== Notable alumni ==
- Cam Akers, National Football League running back for the Los Angeles Rams
- Lance Bass, actor, musician
- Mark Childress, novelist
- Ted DiBiase Jr., actor and professional wrestler.
- Meredith Edwards, singer
- Barry Hannah, novelist
- Sasha Goodlett, Women's National Basketball Association player for the Chicago Sky
- Jerod Ward, basketball player
