= List of awards and honors received by Bill Clinton =

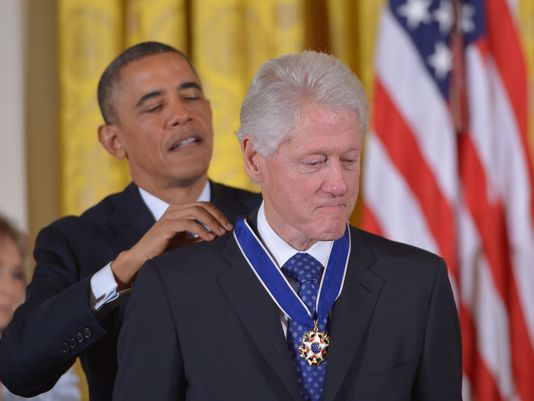
Clinton receiving the Presidential Medal of Freedom from Barack Obama

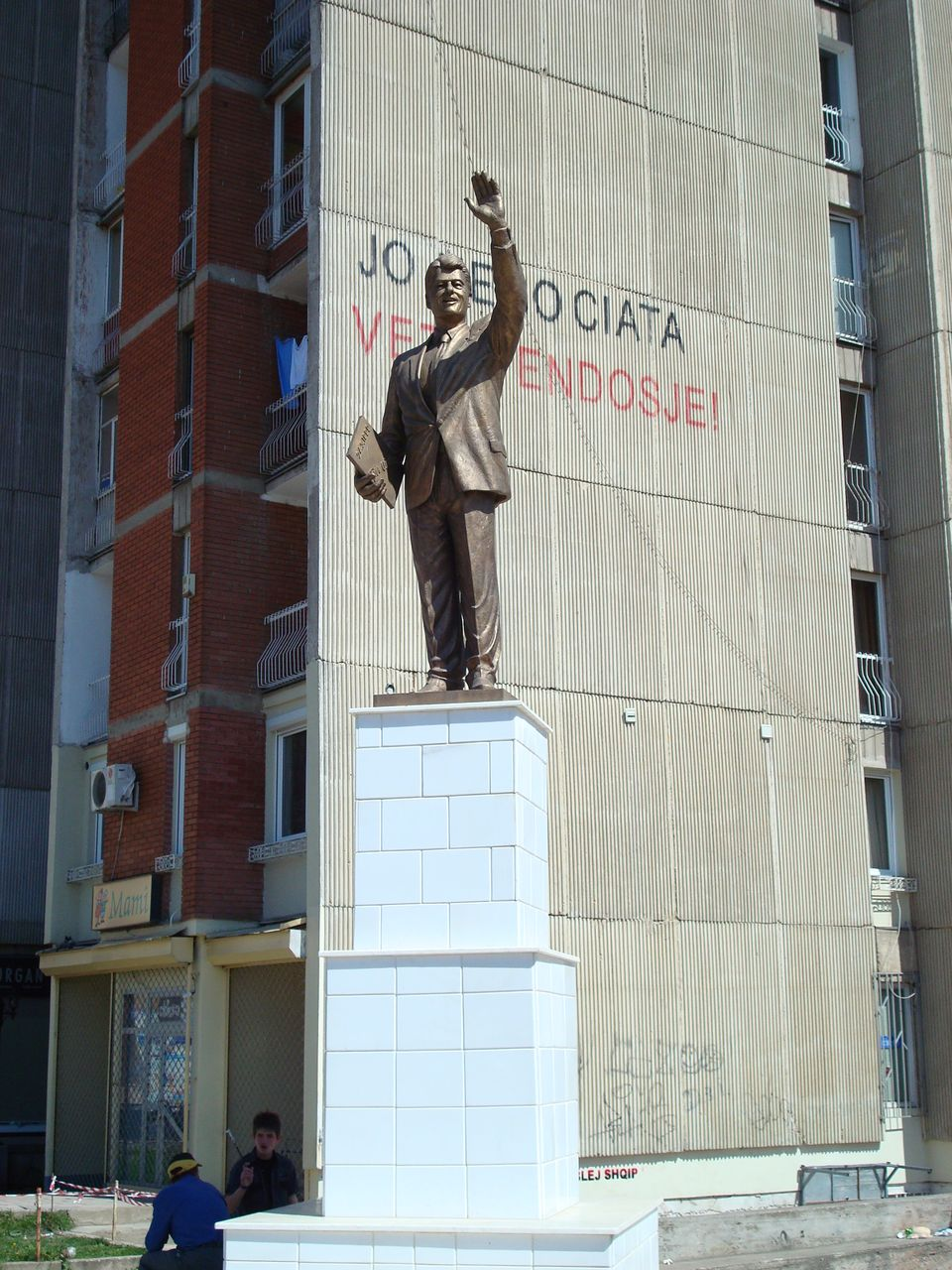
Monumental Clinton statue on Bill Clinton Boulevard in the capital of the Republic of Kosovo.

Bill Clinton served as the 42nd president of the United States from 1993 to 2001. Before that, he was the governor of Arkansas, and afterwards he has continued life in the public eye. He received many awards and honors throughout his career.

== National honors ==
Country	Date	Decoration
United States	5 January 2001	Department of Defense Medal for Distinguished Public Service
United States	8 August 2013	Presidential Medal of Freedom

== Foreign honors ==
Country	Date	Decoration
Saudi Arabia	28 October 1994	Order of King Abdulaziz, First Class
Kuwait	28 October 1994	Collar of the Order of Mubarak the Great
South Africa	27 March 1998	Grand Cross of the Order of Good Hope
Czech Republic	16 September 1998	Collar of the Order of the White Lion
Turkey	15 November 1999	Order of the State of the Republic of Turkey
Lesotho	11 July 2005	Grand Commander of the Most Courteous Order of Lesotho
Estonia	6 February 2006	Collar of the Order of the Cross of Terra Mariana
Papua New Guinea	3 December 2006	Grand Companion of the Order of Logohu
Haiti	21 July 2011	Grand Cross of the National Order of Honour and Merit
Georgia	18 May 2013	St. George's Order of Victory
Israel	19 June 2013	President's Medal
Republic of Kosovo	11 June 2019	Order of Freedom
Timor-Leste	30 May 2019	Grand Collar of the Order of Timor-Leste
Albania	3 July 2023	Grand Cross of the Order of Public Gratitude
Czech Republic	12 March 2024	Grand Cross of the Order of Tomáš Garrigue Masaryk

== Scholastic ==
Chancellor, visitor, governor, rector and fellowships

Location	Date	School	Position
England	October 1992 – Present	University College, Oxford	Honorary Fellow

Honorary degrees

Institution	Degree	Date	Citation
Northeastern University	Honorary degree	1993	
University of North Carolina at Chapel Hill	LL.D.	1993	
University of Oxford	D.C.L.	1994	
Chulalongkorn University	Honorary Degree	1996	
University of Nebraska at Kearney	Honorary Degree	2000	
Queen's University, Belfast	LL.D	2001	
University of Prishtina	Doctor honoris causa	2003	
City College of New York	Honorary LL.D.	2004	
Pace University	Honorary degree	2006	
Tulane University	Honorary LL.D.	2006	
University of Michigan	LL.D.	2006	
Rochester Institute of Technology	L.H.D.	2007	
Knox College (Illinois)	L.H.D.	2007	
University of Hong Kong	LL.D.	2008	
McGill University	L.H.D.	2009	
Icahn School of Medicine at Mount Sinai	L.H.D.	2010	
West Virginia University	L.H.D.	2010	
University of Central Missouri	L.H.D.	2011	
Mediterranean University	Honorary LL.D.	2011	
New York University	Doctor of Laws	2011	
University of Central Florida	Honorary L.H.D.	2013	
University of Edinburgh	Doctor honoris causa	2013	
University of Liverpool	Honorary LL.D.	2014	
Loyola Marymount University	L.H.D.	2016	
St. Francis Xavier University	Doctor honoris causa	2017	
Dublin City University	Honorary doctorate	2017	
University of Haifa	Honorary degree	2022	

== Other awards and honors ==
Multiple schools have been named after Clinton, and many statues in his honor have been erected, including one in Kosovo. The Clinton Presidential Center was opened in Little Rock, Arkansas in his honor on December 5, 2001. He has been honored in various other ways, in countries that include the Czech Republic, New Guinea, Germany, and Kosovo. U.S. states where he has been honored include Missouri, Arkansas, Kentucky, and New York.

In 1993, Clinton was selected as Time magazine's "Man of the Year", and again in 1998, along with Ken Starr. From a poll conducted of the American people in December 1999, Clinton was among eighteen included in Gallup's List of Widely Admired People of the 20th century.

In 2000, Princeton University's American Whig-Cliosophic Society awarded him the James Madison Award for Distinguished Public Service. Also in 2000, Clinton was awarded the Charlemagne Prize which is awarded for work done in the service of European unification. In 2001, Clinton received the NAACP's President's Award.

In 2004, he received a Grammy Award for Best Spoken Word Album for Children for narrating the Russian National Orchestra's album Wolf Tracks and Peter and the Wolf (along with Mikhail Gorbachev and Sophia Loren) and 2005 Grammy Award for Best Spoken Word Album for My Life. In 2005, he received the J. William Fulbright Prize for International Understanding, and 2007 TED Prize (named for the confluence of technology, entertainment and design).

In 2005 he received the Freedom Medal of the Four Freedoms Award.

On June 2, 2007, Clinton, along with former president George H.W. Bush, received the International Freedom Conductor Award, for their help with the fund raising following the tsunami that devastated South Asia in 2004. On June 13, 2007, Clinton was honored by the Global Business Coalition on HIV/AIDS, Tuberculosis and Malaria alongside eight multinational-companies for his work to defeat HIV/AIDS.

On September 9, 2008, Bill Clinton was named as the next chairman of the National Constitution Center in Philadelphia, Pennsylvania. His term began January 1, 2009, and he succeeded former president George H. W. Bush.

On March 15, 2011, Bill Clinton was inducted into Irish America magazine's Irish America Hall of Fame for his crucial role in the Northern Ireland Peace Process.

In 2012, a fish species was named after him, the beaded darter (Etheostoma clinton), for his lasting environmental accomplishments in creating and expanding national monuments, preserving millions of acres of wilderness areas, his leadership and commitment during challenging economic times, and his continued commitment to global humanitarian issues and needs and peace.

In April 2013, Bill Clinton was named the inaugural recipient of the honorary Advocate for Change GLAAD Media Award for his record of promoting tolerance of the LGBT community, including advocating for marriage equality in New York in 2011, advocating against Amendment 1 in North Carolina in 2012, and calling for the Supreme Court of the United States to strike down the Defense of Marriage Act in 2013.

In March 2015, Bill Clinton was listed among the 10 recipients of the maiden edition of Global Seal of Integrity (GSOI) Honors list. An annual list by two young Nigerians, dedicated at promoting trust and honesty for the well-being of the universe.

In March 2018, Belfast City Council voted in favour of awarding Bill Clinton, the Freedom of Belfast, due to his work during the Northern Ireland Peace Process.
