= South Side School District =

School district in Arkansas, United States

Location
- 334 Southside Road; Bee Branch, Arkansas 72013 United States

District information
- Grades: PK–12
- Accreditation: Arkansas Department of Education
- Schools: 2
- NCES District ID: 0514040

Students and staff
- Students: 537
- Teachers: 48.84 (on FTE basis)
- Student–teacher ratio: 11.00

Other information
- Website: https://www.southsidebb.org/

South Side School District (or South Side Public Schools) is a public school district based in Bee Branch, Arkansas, United States. The South Side School District provides early childhood, elementary and secondary education for more than 500 prekindergarten through grade 12 students at its two facilities within Van Buren County, Arkansas. The district is accredited by the Arkansas Department of Education (ADE). It also includes sections of Faulkner County.

It includes Bee Branch, as well as all of Damascus. Additionally Guy and Twin Groves physically extend into the district.

== Schools ==
- South Side High School, serving approximately 200 students in grades 7 through 12.
- South Side Elementary School, serving more than 300 students in kindergarten through grade 6.
