= Chimes, Arkansas =

Chimes
- Unincorporated community
- Location in Arkansas Location in the United States
- Coordinates: 35°41′53″N 92°44′19″W
- Country: United States
- State: Arkansas
- County: Van Buren
- Elevation: 1,864 ft (568 m)
- GNIS feature ID: 76607

Chimes is an unincorporated community in Van Buren County, Arkansas, United States.

The origin of the name "Chimes" is obscure.
