= Alread School District =

Defunct school district in Arkansas, United States

Alread School District No. 5 was a school district headquartered in Alread, an unincorporated area in Van Buren County, Arkansas.

== History ==
The first school in the area was created in the 1800s. The final school facility, the Old Main Building, opened in 1930.

Circa 2004 area residents described the Alread School as the smallest school in the state.

On July 1, 2004, the Alread district consolidated with the Scotland School District into the existing Clinton School District. The Alread middle and high schools closed in 2005, and the Alread elementary school closed in 2006. An arrangement was set up to where people in the westernmost part of the former Alread school district could instead attend school in the Hector School District as they were closer to Hector than Clinton.
