= Alread, Arkansas =

Alread
- Unincorporated community
- Location in Arkansas Location in the United States
- Coordinates: 35°37′58″N 92°40′48″W
- Country: United States
- State: Arkansas
- County: Van Buren
- Elevation: 1,680 ft (510 m)
- GNIS feature ID: 56905

Alread is an unincorporated community in Van Buren County, Arkansas, United States.

== Education ==
The community is a part of the Clinton School District, which operates Clinton High School.

On July 1, 2004, the Alread district consolidated with the Scotland School District into the existing Clinton district.
