= Bee Branch, Arkansas =

Town in Arkansas, United States

- Census-designated place
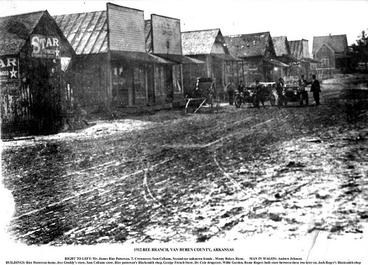
- Picture of Bee Branch taken in 1912.

- Bee Branch's position in Arkansas. Bee Branch, Arkansas (the United States)
- Coordinates: 35°27′22″N 92°23′42″W
- Country: United States
- State: Arkansas
- County: Van Buren County
- Elevation: 778 ft (237 m)

Population (2020)
  - Total: 293
- Time zone: UTC-6 (Central (CST))
  - Summer (DST): UTC-5 (CDT)
- ZIP code: 72013
- GNIS feature ID: 2805621

Bee Branch is an unincorporated community and census-designated place (CDP) in Van Buren County, Arkansas, United States. It was first listed as a CDP in the 2020 census with a population of 293.

More than 70% of the local population consist of married couples. The majority of the population were born out-of-state and exclusively speak the English language. The nearest towns are Clinton and Fairfield Bay.

== History ==
The community has had a post office since Willie D. Neal was named postmaster in 1860. When the post office moved in 1879 near the present-day intersection of U.S. 65 and Highway 92, it applied for the name Crossroads, but was rejected as it had already been duplicated in several parts of the state. The name Bee Branch was chosen for a large beehive in a tree near the post office.

Bee Branch was indirectly affected by an outbreak of tornadoes in November 2005.

== Climate ==
The warmest summers that Bee Branch has witnessed occurred in 1998, 2003, 2005, 2006, 2007, 2009, 2010, 2012, 2013, 2014, 2015 and 2016.

== Education ==
Public education in the townsite is provided by South Side School District, which operates South Side High School.

== Infrastructure ==
The community is located near secondary roads and no Interstate highways in the immediate area. U.S. Route 65 is the most major highway to go through Bee Branch.

== Demographics ==
Historical population
Census	Pop.	Note	%±
2020	293		—
U.S. Decennial Census; 2020

=== 2020 census ===
Bee Branch CDP, Arkansas – Demographic Profile (NH = Non-Hispanic) Note: the US Census treats Hispanic/Latino as an ethnic category. This table excludes Latinos from the racial categories and assigns them to a separate category. Hispanics/Latinos may be of any race.
Race / Ethnicity	Pop 2020	% 2020
White alone (NH)	251	85.67%
Black or African American alone (NH)	2	0.68%
Native American or Alaska Native alone (NH)	3	1.02%
Asian alone (NH)	0	0.00%
Pacific Islander alone (NH)	0	0.00%
Some Other Race alone (NH)	1	0.34%
Mixed Race/Multi-Racial (NH)	19	6.48%
Hispanic or Latino (any race)	17	5.80%
Total	293	100.00%

== Notable people ==
Bee Branch is also the home town of fisherman Larry Nixon.

Arkansas State Representative Kim Hammer, a Baptist clergyman from Saline County, was reared in Bee Branch and graduated from South Side High School.

Jim McKnight, professional baseball player, whose son Jeff McKnight also played in the Major Leagues, was born in Bee Branch.

Amber Straughn, NASA astronomer and James Webb Space Telescope Deputy Project Scientist, was raised in Bee Branch and graduated from South Side High School in 1998.
