= Hector High School =

Location
- 11601 SR 27; Hector, Pope, Arkansas 72843; United States
- Coordinates: 35°28′13″N 92°58′25″W

Information
- School type: Public comprehensive
- Status: Open
- School district: Hector School District
- Superintendent: Shawn Hettinga
- CEEB code: 041070
- NCES School ID: 050762000472
- Principal: Ryan Riley
- Teaching staff: 35.58 (on FTE basis)
- Grades: 7–12
- Enrollment: 324 (2023–2024)
- Student to teacher ratio: 9.11
- Education system: ADE Smart Core
- Classes offered: Regular, Advanced Placement (AP), Concurrent Credit, Career Pathways
- Hours in school day: 8 hours
- Campus type: Suburban
- Colors: Royal blue and white
- Fight song: Notre Dame Victory March
- Athletics conference: 2A–4 (Football); 2A–4 West (Basketball)
- Sports: Cheerleading, softball, shooting sports, basketball, baseball, track and field, football
- Mascot: Wildcat
- Team name: Hector Wildcats / Ladycats
- Rival: Atkins & Dover
- Accreditation: ADE
- Yearbook: "The Wildcat"
- Communities served: Hector, Scottsville, Appleton, Tilly, Jerusalem, Buttermilk, Nogo, Falling Water
- Website: www.hectorschools.net

Hector High School is a comprehensive public high school located in the rural community of Hector, Arkansas, United States. The school provides secondary education for students in grades 7 through 12. It is one of six public high schools in Pope County and the sole high school administered by the Hector School District. The mascot and athletic emblem of Hector High School is the Wildcat. The school colors are royal blue and white.

== Academics ==
Hector is a Title I school that is accredited by the Arkansas Department of Education (ADE). The assumed course of study follows the ADE Smart Core curriculum, which requires students complete at least 22 units prior to graduation. Students complete regular coursework and exams and may take Advanced Placement (AP) courses and exam with the opportunity to receive college credit prior to high school graduation.

== Athletics ==
The Hector Wildcats compete in interscholastic activities within the 2A Classification—the state's second smallest classification—via the 2A Region 4 Conference (football) and 2A Region 4 East Conference (basketball), as administered by the Arkansas Activities Association. The Wildcats field teams in cheer-leading, marching band, football, basketball (boys/girls), baseball, softball, and track and field (boys/girls).
