= Dabney, Arkansas =

- Unincorporated community
- Location within Arkansas Location within the United States
- Coordinates: 35°37′54″N 92°47′12″W
- Country: United States
- State: Arkansas
- County: Van Buren
- Elevation: 1,526 ft (465 m)
- Time zone: UTC-6 (Central (CST))
  - Summer (DST): UTC-5 (CDT)
- Area code: 501
- GNIS feature ID: 71325

Dabney is an unincorporated community in Van Buren County, Arkansas, United States. Dabney is 18.5 miles (29.8 km) west of Clinton.
