= Arkansas Highway 330 =

State highway in Arkansas, United States

Highway 330

Route information
- Maintained by ArDOT
- Length: 4.207 mi (6.771 km)
- Existed: April 24, 1963–present

Major junctions
- West end: AR 16
- East end: Van Buren Recreation Area in Fairfield Bay

Location
- Country: United States
- State: Arkansas

Highway system
- Arkansas Highway System; Interstate; US; State; Business; Spurs; Suffixed; Scenic; Heritage
← AR 329	→ AR 331

Highway 330 (AR 330, Ark. 330, and Hwy. 330) is an east–west state highway in Van Buren County, Arkansas. The highway is a low traffic, two-lane highway connecting Highway 16 to Greers Ferry Lake at Fairfield Bay. Highway 330 is maintained by the Arkansas Department of Transportation (ArDOT). Two former highway designations in the county in the 1960s were returned to local control in 1997 and 2013.

== Route description ==
Highway 330 begins at an intersection with Greenwood Road and Lakeview Lane in Fairfield Bay, a small retirement community on Greers Ferry Lake in North Central Arkansas. State maintenance begins at the boundary of the Van Buren Recreation Area, maintained by the U.S. Army Corps of Engineers for boating, camping, and other recreation on the lake. The highway heads north through an unincorporated area known as Eglantine, roughly paralleling the western boundary of Fairfield Bay toward an intersection with Highway 16. The highway terminates at this intersection just south of the city limits of Shirley.

The ArDOT maintains Highway 330 like all other parts of the state highway system. As a part of these responsibilities, the Department tracks the volume of traffic using its roads in surveys using a metric called average annual daily traffic (AADT). ArDOT estimates the traffic level for a segment of roadway for any average day of the year in these surveys. As of 2018, estimates were 1,100 vehicles per day (VPD) near the Highway 16 terminus.

No segment of Highway 330 is part of the National Highway System (NHS), a network of roads important to the nation's economy, defense, and mobility.

== History ==
=== Current designation ===
The Arkansas State Highway Commission created Highway 330 on April 24, 1963, designating a former county road between Highway 16 and the "Federal Government Reservation boundary at Greers Ferry Reservoir".

=== Former designations ===
Highway 330
- Location: Choctaw
- Length: 4.4 mi (7.1 km)
- Existed: c. October 1928–December 11, 2013

A state highway with access to Choctaw first appeared on the October 1928 state highway map, numbered as State Road 134. This road remained on the map through July 1931, but was removed on the following map. The road returned to the state highway system between present-day Highway 9 and Choctaw as Highway 130 on the 1937 map. In 1953, the segment west of US 65 was redesignated as Highway 9, trimming the route to approximately 1 mile (1.6 km). The road was renumbered to Highway 330 on November 25, 1958 as part of a statewide renumbering to avoid duplication with the newly-designated Interstate highways (Highway 30 was renumbered to the Highway 130 designation to make way for Interstate 30). On June 23, 1965, it was extended east 1.8 miles (2.9 km) along a county road to the Choctaw Recreation Area.

The highway was returned to local maintenance in December 2013. The Highway Commission utilized a policy that allows returning state highways to local control to offset the costs of non-reimbursable utility relocation where small water utilities do not have necessary funds to relocate their lines along important highway projects. Van Buren County assumed maintenance of Highway 330 (and a segment of Highway 336) following verification that the Bee Branch Water Association and Dennard Water Association would not be able to afford relocation of their water mains along US 65, which was widened under the Connecting Arkansas Program.

Highway 330
- Location: Clinton
- Length: 0.9 mi (1,400 m)
- Existed: November 23, 1966–September 24, 1997

A third segment of Highway 330 was designated in Clinton, the small-town county seat of Van Buren County on November 23, 1966. Beginning at Main Street, School Street (now Yellowjacket Street) and Patton Street to US 65 near the bridge over the Little Red River were added to the state highway system. This roadway remained under state maintenance until September 24, 1997, when the City of Clinton agreed to resume local maintenance in exchange for the Arkansas State Highway and Transportation Department constructing an intersection improvement project at the former highway's eastern terminus.

== Major intersections ==
The entire highway is in Van Buren County.

Location	mi	km	Destinations	Notes
Fairfield Bay	0.000	0.000	Greenwood Road / Lakeview Lane	
	4.207	6.771	AR 16 – Shirley, Clinton, Fairfield Bay	
1.000 mi = 1.609 km; 1.000 km = 0.621 mi
