= Southside, Van Buren County, Arkansas =

Southside
- Unincorporated community
- Location in Arkansas Location in the United States
- Coordinates: 35°25′35″N 92°23′24″W
- Country: United States
- State: Arkansas
- County: Van Buren
- Elevation: 758 ft (231 m)
- ZIP code: 78420
- GNIS feature ID: 58664

Southside is an unincorporated community located in Van Buren County, Arkansas.
