= The Clinton School =

Public middle and high school in Manhattan, New York

Coordinates: 40.7361°N 73.9923°W

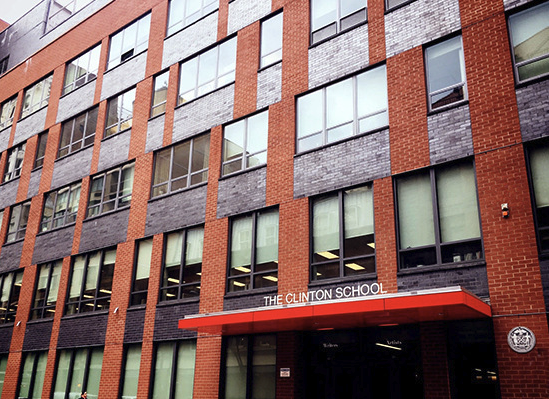

Location
- 10 East 15th Street; New York, New York 10003; United States

Information
- Type: Public International Baccalaureate high school
- School district: New York City Department of Education (District 2)
- Faculty: 88 FTEs
- Grades: 6–12
- Enrollment: 840
- Student to teacher ratio: 12.53:1
- Campus: Urban (Union Square)
- Mascot: Hawks
- Newspaper: theclintonpost.com
- Website: theclintonschool.net

The Clinton School is a public middle and high school in the Union Square area of Manhattan, New York City. It serves students in grades 6 through 12 and is part of the New York City Department of Education.

== Academics ==
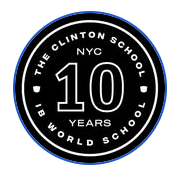
The Clinton School - IB World School

The Clinton School serves grades 6–12 and follows an International Baccalaureate (IB)–aligned curriculum that culminates in the IB Diploma Programme in grades 11–12.

As of the 2023–24 school year, it enrolled approximately 840 students in grades 6–12.

Independent reviewers have described the program as academically rigorous yet supportive, with students advancing quickly through core requirements. According to InsideSchools,

“The academic load is intense, but students get lots of support. Eighth-graders take high school math and science courses to complete two of the five Regents exams required for graduation, and they complete the rest by the end of 10th grade.”

== Rankings and recognition ==
- According to the U.S. News & World Report 2024 Best High Schools Rankings, The Clinton School is ranked #145 nationally and 15th in New York State.
- For 2023-24, The Clinton School had a 4-year graduation rate of 99%.
- Ranked among the top 25 public high schools in New York State by local coverage of the U.S. News & World Report for 2025.

== International Baccalaureate Diploma Program (IBDP) ==
The Clinton School offers the IB diploma in the twelfth grades, with challenging courses offered from grades nine to twelve as preparation. The IB participation rate at The Clinton School is 93%.

== Student life ==
The Clinton Post

Students at The Clinton School participate in a variety of extracurricular activities, clubs, and community projects. They also publish The Clinton Post, the school’s online student news site.

The school maintains an active presence on social media, including an official Instagram account, @theclintonschoolnyc, which highlights student activities, events, and academic achievements.

== Clubs and athletics ==
As of the 2025–26 school year, The Clinton School offers a wide variety of student-led clubs across academic, creative, social, and recreational interests. A partial list includes:

Academic clubs

- Student Council
- Model United Nations
- Debate Club
- Pre-Med Club
- Peer Tutoring
- Girls Who Code
- Math Team
- Public Health Club
- Mock Trial
- National Honor Society

Creative clubs

- The Clinton Post (Newspaper)
- Jewelry for Good
- Songwriting Club
- Clinton Theater Company
- Illustration Club
- Music Club
- Guitar Enrichment Club

Social clubs

- Community Cares
- Sports for a Cause
- Jewish Student Union (JSU)
- Key Club
- UNICEF
- Red Cross Club
- Sexperts
- Gender and Sexuality Alliance (GSA)
- Asian Student Union
- Community Circles Facilitators
- Student Visionaries of the Year (LLS)
- Arab Cultural Association
- Girl Up
- Green Team
- Black Latin Power Student Union (BLPU)

Hobby clubs

- Self-Defense Club
- Wiffle Ball
- Book Club
- Golf Club
- American Sign Language Club
- Crafts for Comfort
- Cinema Club
- Cheer Team

Club sports

- Co-ed Basketball Club
- Co-ed Volleyball Club
- Co-ed Badminton Club
- Co-ed Cheerleading Club

Varsity athletics

The Clinton School currently offers ten PSAL varsity sports teams:

- Girls Soccer (Fall)
- Boys Soccer (Fall)
- Girls Volleyball (Fall)
- Boys Volleyball (Spring)
- Girls Cross-Country (Fall)
- Boys Cross-Country (Fall)
- Girls Basketball (Winter)
- Boys Basketball (Winter)
- Girls Outdoor Track & Field (Spring)
- Boys Outdoor Track & Field (Spring)

A Junior Varsity Girls Volleyball team (non-PSAL) is also available for tryouts.
