= South Side High School (Bee Branch, Arkansas) =

Coordinates: 35.430043°N 92.389698°W

Location
- 334 County Road 42; Bee Branch, Arkansas 72013; United States

Information
- School type: Public comprehensive
- Status: Open
- NCES District ID: 051270
- CEEB code: 040150
- NCES School ID: 05127001014
- Teaching staff: 27.60
- Grades: 7–12
- Enrollment: 252 (2016-17)
- Student to teacher ratio: 9.54
- Education system: ADE Smart Core Curriculum
- Colors: Blue and white
- Slogan: Focus On Excellence
- Athletics conference: 1A 2 South (2012–14)
- Mascot: Hornet
- Team name: South Side Bee Branch Hornets
- Accreditation: ADE
- Feeder schools: South Side Elementary School
- Affiliation: Arkansas Activities Association (AAA)
- Website: www.southsidebb.org/92625_2

South Side High School is a public junior/senior high school for students in grades seven through twelve in Bee Branch, Arkansas, United States. In the 2010–11 school year, South Side High School had 207 students enrolled. The same facilities administered by South Side School District in Van Buren County are used for students in kindergarten through sixth grade and is known as South Side Elementary School. South Side High School is currently one of the smallest "single A" public schools in Arkansas since the 2009–10 statewide school consolidations.

== History ==
South Side was erected in 1929 and given its name by Dink Ingram. The first superintendent was J. K. Ross. During this same year an Agriculture building was erected and was followed the same year by the erection of a gymnasium in 1936 and Home Economics Cottage in 1939. In January 1940 the fourteen-year-old high school burned, and classes were held in other buildings until a new building was finished in 1941. In 1948 a new elementary school building was erected. On the night of November 15, 1988, an F3 tornado destroyed the high school and gym, and damaged several other buildings. However, this destruction led to widespread community support for a massive rebuilding and improvement effort beginning the same year.

== Academics ==
The assumed course of study for students follow the Smart Core curriculum developed by the Arkansas Department of Education (ADE). Students complete regular (core and elective) and career focus courses and exams and may select Advanced Placement (AP) coursework and exams that provide an opportunity for college credit. South Side is associated with the Conway Area Career Center to support the students' career and technical education needs.

In the 2007–08 academic year, the Senior Quiz Bowl team placed third in the "single A" State Championship and held an undefeated record against public schools. In the 2008 Senior Beta Quiz Bowl Competition, the team defeated many five and six "A" schools. In the 1994–95 school year, the Senior Quiz Bowl team placed first in the Senior Beta Quiz Bowl Competition and went on to compete nationally. Also in 1995 the Senior Quiz Bowl team won the State "A" division competition and received runner-up status to Fort Smith North Side in the overall competition. The tournament was broadcast on the Arkansas Educational Television Network (AETN). The Junior High Quiz Bowl team placed third in the region this past year.

== Athletics ==
The mascot and athletic emblem for South Side High School is the hornet with blue and white serving as school colors.

For 2012–14 school years, the school participates in interscholastic competition at the state's smallest classification level (1A) in the 1A-2 South Conference administered by the Arkansas Activities Association (AAA) in such sports as basketball, baseball, softball, golf, and track and field.

On May 11, 2007, the South Side High School boys' baseball team won the 1A State Championship against Trinity Christian of Texarkana. Over a four-year period, the high school boys' baseball team compiled a 126–8 record. South Side High School won the overall state championship in 1990–91 (regardless of class), the first 1A school in the state ever to do so. During the 2009–10 school year, the South Side High School girls' track and field team won district and placed as runner-up at 1A State.

== Notable alumni ==
- Kim Hammer (c. 1976) — Republican member of the Arkansas House of Representatives from District 28 since 2011; Baptist clergyman and hospice chaplain
