= Griffin Township, Pope County, Arkansas =

Griffin Township
- Township
- Location in Arkansas
- Coordinates: 35°25′30″N 92°52′36″W
- Country: United States
- State: Arkansas
- County: Pope
- Established: 1854

Area
  - Total: 34.09 sq mi (88.3 km^{2})
  - Land: 33.94 sq mi (87.9 km^{2})
  - Water: 0.15 sq mi (0.39 km^{2})
- Elevation: 502 ft (153 m)

Population (2010)
  - Total: 839
  - Density: 24.7/sq mi (9.5/km^{2})
- Time zone: UTC-6 (CST)
  - Summer (DST): UTC-5 (CDT)
- Zip code: 72822 (Appleton)
- Area code: 479
- GNIS feature ID: 69705

Griffin Township is one of nineteen current townships in Pope County, Arkansas, USA. As of the 2010 census, its total population was 839.

== Geography ==
According to the United States Census Bureau, Griffin Township covers an area of 34.09 square miles (88.3 km^{2}); 33.94 square miles (87.9 km^{2}) of land and 0.15 square miles (0.39 km^{2}) of water.

=== Cities, towns, and villages ===
- Appleton
