= Appleton, Arkansas =

- Census-designated place
- Appleton's position in Arkansas. Appleton, Arkansas (the United States)
- Coordinates: 35°25′27″N 92°53′09″W
- Country: United States
- State: Arkansas
- County: Pope County, Arkansas
- Post Office opened: 1879-1968
- Elevation: 499 ft (152 m)

Population (2020)
  - Total: 399
- Time zone: UTC-6 (Central (CST))
  - Summer (DST): UTC-5 (CDT)
- Area code: 72823
- GNIS feature ID: 2805618

Appleton is an unincorporated community and census-designated place (CDP) in Griffin Township, Pope County, Arkansas, United States. It was first listed as a CDP in the 2020 census with a population of 399.

The town contained a post office from 1879 until 1968. It was named for an apple orchard that surrounded an early drug store.

== Demographics ==
Historical population
Census	Pop.	Note	%±
2020	399		—
U.S. Decennial Census; 2020

=== 2020 census ===
Appleton CDP, Arkansas Racial and ethnic composition Note: the US Census treats Hispanic/Latino as an ethnic category. This table excludes Latinos from the racial categories and assigns them to a separate category. Hispanics/Latinos may be of any race.
Race / Ethnicity (NH = Non-Hispanic)	Pop 2020	% 2020
White alone (NH)	334	83.71%
Black or African American alone (NH)	0	0.00%
Native American or Alaska Native alone (NH)	6	1.50%
Asian alone (NH)	2	0.50%
Pacific Islander alone (NH)	1	0.25%
Some Other Race alone (NH)	0	0.00%
Mixed Race or Multi-Racial (NH)	30	7.52%
Hispanic or Latino (any race)	26	6.52%
Total	399	100.00%

== Education ==
It is in the Hector School District.
