= Hector, Arkansas =

- Town
- Location of Hector in Pope County, Arkansas.
- Coordinates: 35°27′53″N 92°58′33″W
- Country: United States
- State: Arkansas
- County: Pope

Area
  - Total: 2.29 sq mi (5.93 km^{2})
  - Land: 2.29 sq mi (5.92 km^{2})
  - Water: 0.0039 sq mi (0.01 km^{2})
- Elevation: 722 ft (220 m)

Population (2020)
  - Total: 411
  - Estimate (2025): 415 ▲
  - Density: 179.8/sq mi (69.43/km^{2})
- Time zone: UTC-6 (Central (CST))
  - Summer (DST): UTC-5 (CDT)
- ZIP code: 72843
- Area code: 479
- FIPS code: 05-31150
- GNIS feature ID: 2405813
- Website: www.hectorar.com

Hector is a town in Pope County, Arkansas, United States. As of the 2020 census, Hector had a population of 411. It is part of the Russellville Micropolitan Statistical Area.

== Geography ==
According to the United States Census Bureau, the town has a total area of 6.0 km^{2} (2.3 sq mi), of which 6.0 km^{2} (2.3 sq mi) is land and 0.43% is water.

== History ==
After the Civil War and the partial destruction of the original settlement of the area, Boiling Springs, the area was settled and a tannery and federally ran whiskey distillery were built.

President Grover Cleveland's dog by the President himself when postal officials grew frustrated with the residents' indecision on whether to name the community Avondale or The Plain.

In 1908 the town was partially destroyed by a strong storm.

== Demographics ==
Historical population
Census	Pop.	Note	%±
1970	387		—
1980	449		16.0%
1990	478		6.5%
2000	506		5.9%
2010	450		−11.1%
2020	411		−8.7%
2025 (est.)	415	▲	1.0%
U.S. Decennial Census

At the 2000 census there were 506 people in 190 households, including 143 families, in the town. The population density was 84.6/km^{2} (219.5/mi^{2}). There were 219 housing units at an average density of 36.6/km^{2} (95.0/mi^{2}). The racial makeup of the town was 96.64% White, 0.99% Native American, 0.20% Asian, 0.20% Pacific Islander, 0.59% from other races, and 1.38% from two or more races. 2.57% of the population were Hispanic or Latino of any race. Of the 190 households 39.5% had children under the age of 18 living with them, 57.9% were married couples living together, 14.7% had a female householder with no husband present, and 24.7% were non-families. 22.6% of households were one person and 14.2% were one person aged 65 or older. The average household size was 2.66 and the average family size was 3.16.

The age distribution was 30.4% under the age of 18, 7.5% from 18 to 24, 28.5% from 25 to 44, 19.8% from 45 to 64, and 13.8% 65 or older. The median age was 36 years. For every 100 females, there were 108.2 males. For every 100 females age 18 and over, there were 93.4 males.

The median household income was $31,250 and the median family income was $36,375. Males had a median income of $29,063 versus $18,750 for females. The per capita income for the town was $13,432. About 9.1% of families and 11.5% of the population were below the poverty line, including 15.7% of those under age 18 and 10.3% of those age 65 or over.

== Education ==
Public education of elementary and secondary school students is provided by the Hector School District, including:

- Hector Elementary School, serving kindergarten through grade 6.
- Hector High School, serving grades 7 through 12.
- ARVAC Head Start - Hector Center serving prekindergarten.

== Climate ==
The climate in this area is characterized by hot, humid summers and generally mild to cool winters. According to the Köppen Climate Classification system, Hector has a humid subtropical climate, abbreviated "Cfa" on climate maps.
