= Scotland School District (Arkansas) =

Defunct school district in Arkansas, United States

Scotland School District was a school district headquartered in Scotland, an unincorporated area in Van Buren County, Arkansas.

In the 2000s the Scotland high school building, listed on the Arkansas Historical Register since December 6, 2000 and dedicated on March 26, 1926, was the oldest in use in the state. Prior to the school's closure, it was the county's oldest school facility still in use as one.

On July 1, 2004, the Scotland district consolidated with the Alread School District into the existing Clinton School District. Scotland's middle and high school divisions closed in 2005, and the elementary division closed in 2006.
