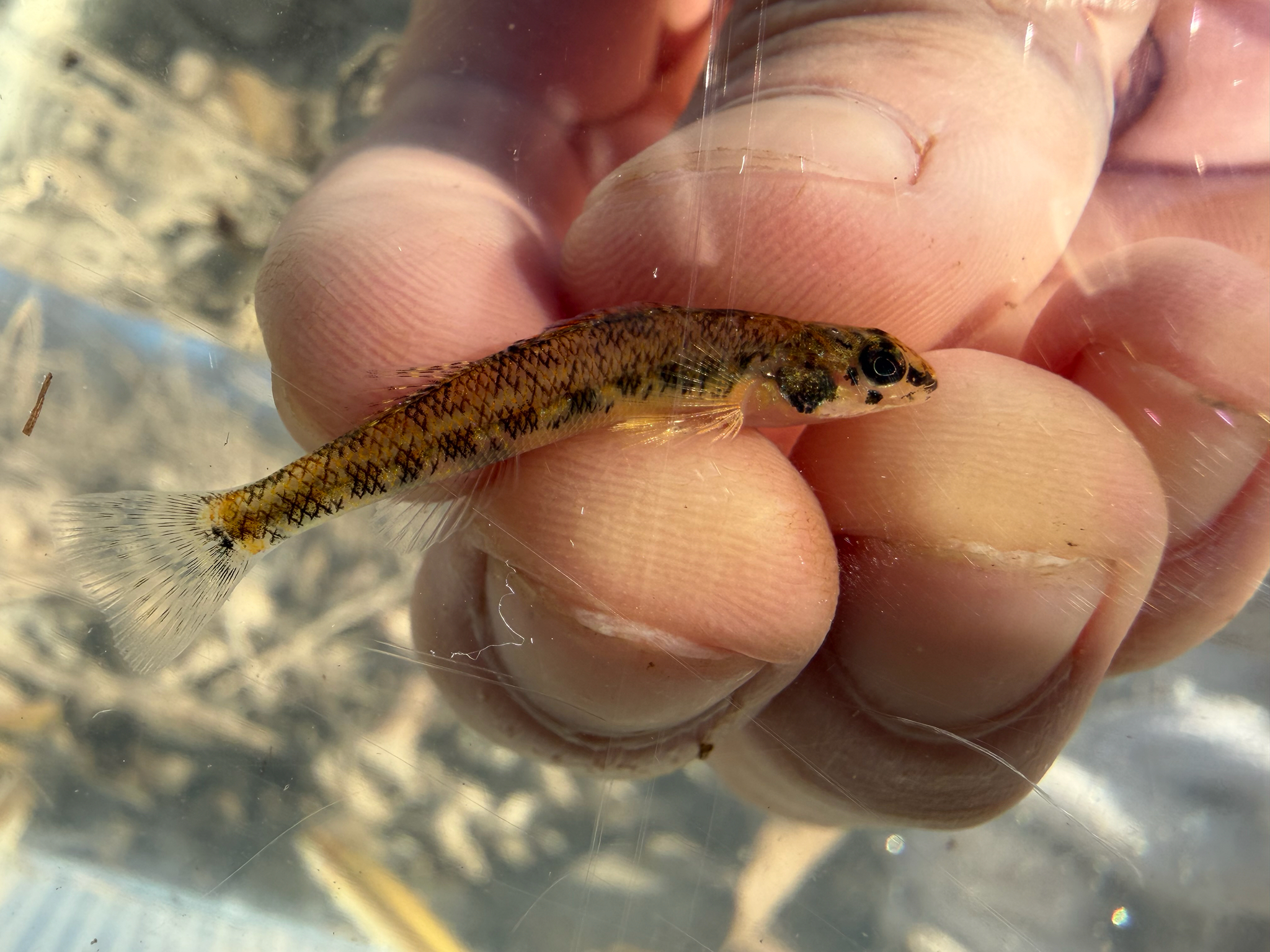

Conservation status
- Imperiled (NatureServe)

Scientific classification
- Kingdom: Animalia
- Phylum: Chordata
- Class: Actinopterygii
- Order: Perciformes
- Family: Percidae
- Genus: Etheostoma
- Species: E. clinton

Binomial name
- Etheostoma clinton Layman & Mayden, 2012

= Beaded darter =

Species of fish

The beaded darter (Etheostoma clinton) is a species of freshwater ray-finned fish, a darter from the subfamily Etheostomatinae, part of the family Percidae, which also contains the perches, ruffes and pikeperches. It is found in the upper Caddo and upper Ouachita Rivers upstream of the fall line in the Ouachita Mountains of Arkansas.

It was named after the 42nd president of the United States Bill Clinton for "his lasting environmental accomplishments in creating and expanding national monuments, preserving millions of acres of wilderness areas, his leadership and commitment during challenging economic times, and his continued commitment to global humanitarian issues and needs and peace."

== See also ==
- Etheostoma gore – another species of darter, named after Clinton's vice-president Al Gore
- List of organisms named after famous people (born 1925–1949)
