= McArthur, Arkansas =

- Unincorporated community
- McArthur's position in Arkansas McArthur, Arkansas (the United States)
- Coordinates: 33°41′22.4″N 91°20′5.4″W
- Country: United States
- State: Arkansas
- County: Desha
- Township: Clayton
- Elevation: 148 ft (45 m)
- Time zone: UTC-6 (Central (CST))
  - Summer (DST): UTC-5 (CDT)
- ZIP code: 71654
- Area code: 870
- GNIS feature ID: 58138

McArthur is an unincorporated community in Clayton Township, Desha County, Arkansas. It is located on Arkansas Highway 1 northeast of McGehee.

McArthur is one of two possible sites of the death of Hernando de Soto. The Natives of the region called the Mississippi River "Tamaliseu", while De Soto called it "Río del Espíritu Santo". Afraid of revealing to the Native Americans that he was a mortal and not a deity, he opted for a watery burial under the Mississippi.
