= Pleasant Grove, Van Buren County, Arkansas =

Pleasant Grove, Arkansas
- Unincorporated community
- Location within Arkansas Location within the United States
- Coordinates: 35°29′34″N 92°36′54″W
- Country: United States
- State: Arkansas
- County: Van Buren
- Elevation: 801 ft (244 m)
- Time zone: UTC-6 (Central (CST))
  - Summer (DST): UTC-5 (CDT)
- Area code: 501
- GNIS feature ID: 58398

Pleasant Grove is an unincorporated community in Van Buren County, Arkansas, United States. Pleasant Grove is located along Arkansas Highway 95, 11 miles (18 km) southwest of Clinton.
