= Dennard, Arkansas =

- Census-designated place
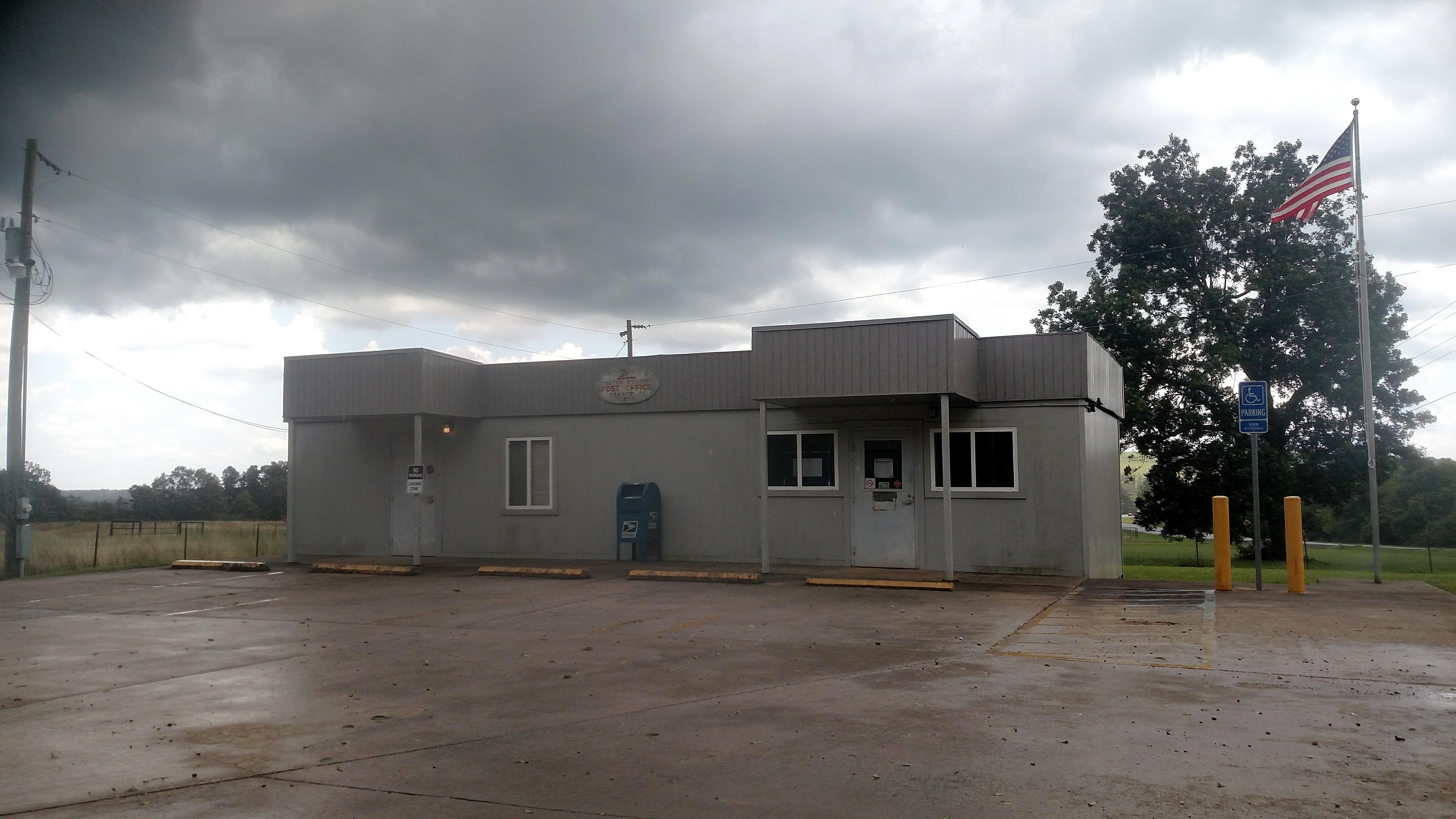
- Dennard Post Office

- Location of Dennard in Van Buren County, Arkansas.

- Location within Arkansas Location within the United States
- Coordinates: 35°46′02″N 92°31′45″W
- Country: United States
- State: Arkansas
- County: Van Buren
- Township: Washington

Area
  - Total: 21.93 sq mi (56.80 km^{2})
  - Land: 21.90 sq mi (56.72 km^{2})
  - Water: 0.031 sq mi (0.08 km^{2})
- Elevation: 1,431 ft (436 m)

Population (2020)
  - Total: 496
  - Density: 22.7/sq mi (8.75/km^{2})
- Time zone: UTC-6 (Central (CST))
  - Summer (DST): UTC-5 (CDT)
- ZIP code: 72629
- Area code: 501
- GNIS feature ID: 2612125

Dennard is a census-designated place in Van Buren County, Arkansas, United States. Its population was 496 as of the 2020 census.

== History ==
Dennard's post office was established in 1886. It first appeared as a census-designated place in the 2010 census.

== Demographics ==
Historical population
Census	Pop.	Note	%±
2010	530		—
2020	496		−6.4%
U.S. Decennial Census

=== 2020 census ===
Dennard racial composition
Race	Num.	Perc.
White	471	94.96%
Black or African American	0	0.0%
Native American	1	0.2%
Asian	0	0.0%
Pacific Islander	0	0.0%
Other/Mixed	24	4.83%
Hispanic or Latino	15	3.02%

At the 2020 United States Census, there were 496 people and 216 households residing in Dennard.

The population density was 22.65 people per square mile (8.75 people/km^{2}), with 301 housing units at an average density of 13.74 per square mile (5.31/km^{2}).

=== 2010 census ===
At the 2010 United States census, there were 530 people, 220 households, and 148 families residing in Dennard. The population density was 24.4 people per square mile (9.4 people/km^{2}), with 288 housing units at an average density of 13.3 per square mile (5.1/km^{2}). The racial makeup was 505 (95.3%) White, 0 (0.0%) Black, 0 (0.0%) Native American, 0 (0.0%) Asian, 0 (0.0%) Pacific Islander, 1 (0.2%) from other races, and 24 (4.5%) from two or more races. 7 people (1.3%) of any race were Hispanic or Latino.

There were 220 households, of which 51 (34.5%) had children under the age of 18 living with them, 112 (50.9%) were married couples living together, 23 (4.3%) were unmarried opposite-sex partnerships, 1 (0.2%) were unmarried same-sex partnerships, 27 (12.2%) had a female householder with no husband present, and 72 (32.7%) were non-families. 54 (24.5%) households were made up of individuals, and 20 (9.0%) had someone living alone who was 65 years of age or older. The average household size was 2.41, and the average family size was 2.86.

The population was spread out, with 123 people (23.2%) under the age of 18, 26 people (4.9%) aged 18 to 24, 116 people (21.8%) aged 25 to 44, 178 people (33.5%) aged 45 to 64, and 87 people (16.6%) who were 65 years of age or older. The median age was 45 years. For every 100 females, there were 100.8 males.

== Education ==
Public education for elementary and secondary school students in the majority of the CDP is provided by the Clinton School District, which leads students to graduate from Clinton High School.

A very small portion is in the Searcy County School District.
