= Rogier Windhorst =

Dutch astronomer (born 1955)

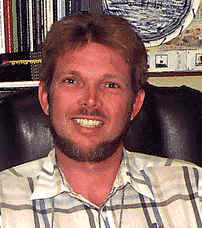
- Born: 1955 (age 70–71)
- Education: University of Leiden
- Scientific career
- Fields: Astronomy
- Workplaces: Arizona State University

Rogier Arnold Windhorst (born 1955) is an astronomer and a professor of physics and astronomy at Arizona State University. He received his Ph.D. in astronomy in 1984 from the University of Leiden and did post doctorate work at Mt.Wilson and Las Campanas Observatories. He currently serves as associate chair at Arizona State and is among six Arizona state faculty who were awarded Regents Professor appointments in 2006; he presides over the School of Earth and Space Exploration at the university. In 2008, he became Foundation Professor of Astrophysics at Arizona State University and co-director of the ASU Cosmology Initiative.

Windhorst has authored over 100 published scientific papers and has given over 125 lectures at seminars. His research has led to new understandings of how the universe first began. He also studies black holes. His research focuses on Astrophysics and Space Science, and he is the principal investigator of the Hubble Space Telescope mid-UV bright galaxy survey. He is one of the six Interdisciplinary Scientists worldwide for the James Webb Space Telescope, and member of the JWST Flight Science Working Group. Windhorst is involved in planning the JWST science performance, and in critical oversights of its entire design and construction phase.
