= Pleasant Grove, Union County, Arkansas =

Pleasant Grove, Arkansas
- Unincorporated community
- Location within Arkansas Location within the United States
- Coordinates: 33°05′46″N 92°33′06″W
- Country: United States
- State: Arkansas
- County: Union
- Elevation: 223 ft (68 m)
- Time zone: UTC-6 (Central (CST))
  - Summer (DST): UTC-5 (CDT)
- Area code: 870
- GNIS feature ID: 59804

Pleasant Grove is an unincorporated community in Union County, Arkansas, United States. Pleasant Grove is 10 miles (16 km) southeast of El Dorado.
