= Clinton School District (Arkansas) =

School district in Arkansas, United States

Location
- 683 Poplar Street; Clinton, Arkansas 72031 United States

District information
- Grades: PK–12
- Established: 1879
- Schools: 4
- NCES District ID: 0504410

Students and staff
- Students: 1,398
- Teachers: 112.46 (on FTE basis)
- Student–teacher ratio: 12.43
- Athletic conference: 4A Region 2 (2012–14)
- Colors: Black Gold

Other information
- Website: www.clintonsd.org

Clinton School District is a public school district based in Clinton, Arkansas, United States. The district provides early childhood, elementary and secondary education for more than 1,400 prekindergarten through grade 12 students. Students are from 479.18 square miles (1,241.1 km^{2}) of land.

In Van Buren County, the district includes Clinton and most of Dennard. It also includes the unincorporated areas of Alread and Scotland. The school district extends into Pope County. Clinton School District is accredited by the Arkansas Department of Education (ADE).

== History ==
Formalized education in Clinton began in 1879 with the start of the Clinton Male and Female Academy.

On July 1, 2004, the Alread School District and the Scotland School District consolidated into the existing Clinton school district. An arrangement was set up to where people in the westernmost part of the former Alread school district could instead attend school in the Hector School District as they were closer to Hector than Clinton.

== Schools ==
Secondary schools:

- Clinton High School—serving approximately 300 students in grades 10 through 12.
- Clinton Junior High School—serving approximately 300 students in grades 7 through 9.

Elementary schools:

- Clinton Intermediate School—serving approximately 300 students in grades 4 through 6.
- Cowsert Elementary School—serving approximately 500 students in pre-kindergarten through grade 3.

Former schools:

- Alread High School - In the 2004-2005 school year it continued to operate as a K-12 school. For the 2005-2006 school year it only had elementary school, with middle school students moved to Clinton Junior High School and high school students moved to Clinton High School. At the end of that school year, it closed as per instructions from the Arkansas Department of Education.
- Scotland High School - In the 2004-2005 school year it continued to operate as a K-12 school. For the 2005-2006 school year it only had elementary school, with middle school students moved to Clinton Junior High School and high school students moved to Clinton High School. At the end of that school year, it closed as per instructions from the Arkansas Department of Education.
