= Clinton Public School District =

School district in Mississippi, US

Address
- 201 Easthaven Drive Clinton, Mississippi, 39056; United States

District information
- Type: Public
- Grades: PK–13
- Schools: 9
- NCES District ID: 2801090

Students and staff
- Students: 5,148 (2025–2026)
- Teachers: 357.00 (on an FTE basis) (2025–2026)
- Staff: 304.46 (on an FTE basis) (2025–2026)
- Student–teacher ratio: 14.42 (2025–2026)

Other information
- Website: www.clintonpublicschools.com

The Clinton Public School District is a public school district based in Clinton, Mississippi, United States. The district serves over 5,100 students.

It includes almost all of Clinton and a small section of northwest Jackson.

== History ==
School segregation in the district ended in 1970. In fulfilling desegregation requirements, the district implemented a setup in which every student attends each school within the district. Prior to desegregation Sumner Hill and Lovett served Clinton's African American students.

== Schools ==
Secondary schools

- Grades 10-12: Clinton High School
- Grade 9: Sumner Hill Junior High School
- Grades 7-8: Clinton Junior High School

Elementary schools

- Grade 6: Lovett Elementary School
- Grades 4-5: Eastside Elementary School
- Grades 2-3: Northside Elementary School
- Grades K-1: Clinton Park Elementary School

Other Campuses

- Clinton High School Career Complex (Grades 10-12)
- Clinton Alternative School

== Demographics and student performance ==
In 2017 the district's student body was over 52% black and 39% white, and about 40% of students were enrolled in free or reduced lunch programs, a marker of low socioeconomic status. Less than half of the teaching staff was black. Under Mississippi state accountability rankings the school made an "A". Sierra Mannie stated that the "intentional integration" done by the district, ensuring that schools remained racially integrated, as well as the community's rate of low income residents only being 15.5%, meant that it received academic performance that was "an apparent anomaly" as schools with majority black student bodies tended to have lower achievement. Mannie wrote that all of the schools performed well because there were no alternative schools in which parents could self-segregate to.

=== 2006-07 school year ===
There were a total of 4,859 students enrolled in the Clinton Public School District during the 2006–2007 school year. The gender makeup of the district was 50% female and 50% male. The racial makeup of the district was 47.73% African American, 47.97% white, 3.09% Asian, 1.09% Hispanic, and 0.12% Native American. 28.9% of the district's students were eligible to receive free lunch.

== Accountability statistics ==
	2006-07	2005-06	2004-05	2003-04	2002-03
District Accreditation Status	Accredited	Accredited	Accredited	Accredited	Accredited
School Performance Classifications
Level 5 (Superior Performing) Schools	4	4	5	5	2
Level 4 (Exemplary) Schools	2	2	1	1	3
Level 3 (Successful) Schools	0	0	0	0	0
Level 2 (Under Performing) Schools	0	0	0	0	0
Level 1 (Low Performing) Schools	0	0	0	0	0
Not Assigned	1	0	0	0	0

== See also ==
- List of school districts in Mississippi
