= SSAA choir =

Choir of two soprano and two alto sections

In music, SSAA is an initialism referring to a choir composed of two distinct Soprano (S) sections and two distinct Alto (A) sections. In an SSAA choir, First Sopranos sing the highest musical line, followed by Second Sopranos, First Altos, and Second Altos on the lowest line. First sopranos typically have the melody, with second sopranos and altos in harmonies. Women's choirs frequently sing a mixture of SSA and SSAA songs, and in order to create optimal balance, voices may be divided differently in an SSAA arrangement. Some mezzo-sopranos will sing the First Alto line. SSA is the more common arrangement by volume of music available.

== See also ==
- Choir
  - Boys' choir
  - Girls' choir
  - Women's choir
- SATB
