= Clinton School District (Missouri) =

School district in Missouri, U.S.

Address
- 707 S 8th Street Clinton, Missouri, 64735; United States

District information
- Type: Public school district
- Grades: Pre-K to 12
- Superintendent: Dan Brungardt
- School board: Clinton Board of Education
- NCES District ID: 2909860

Students and staff
- Enrollment: 1,827 (2020-2021)
- Faculty: 128.70 (on an FTE basis)
- Student–teacher ratio: 14.20

Other information
- Website: www.clintoncardinals.org

Clinton School District is a public school district located in Clinton, Missouri. The district educates about 1,900 students in Pre-kindergarten through grade 12.

== Schools ==
School	Grades
Clinton Early Childhood Center	PreK
Henry Elementary School	K–2
Clinton Intermediate School	3–5
Clinton Middle School	6–8
Clinton High School	9–12
Clinton Technical School	11–12
