= Van Buren County, Arkansas =

County in Arkansas, United States

- County
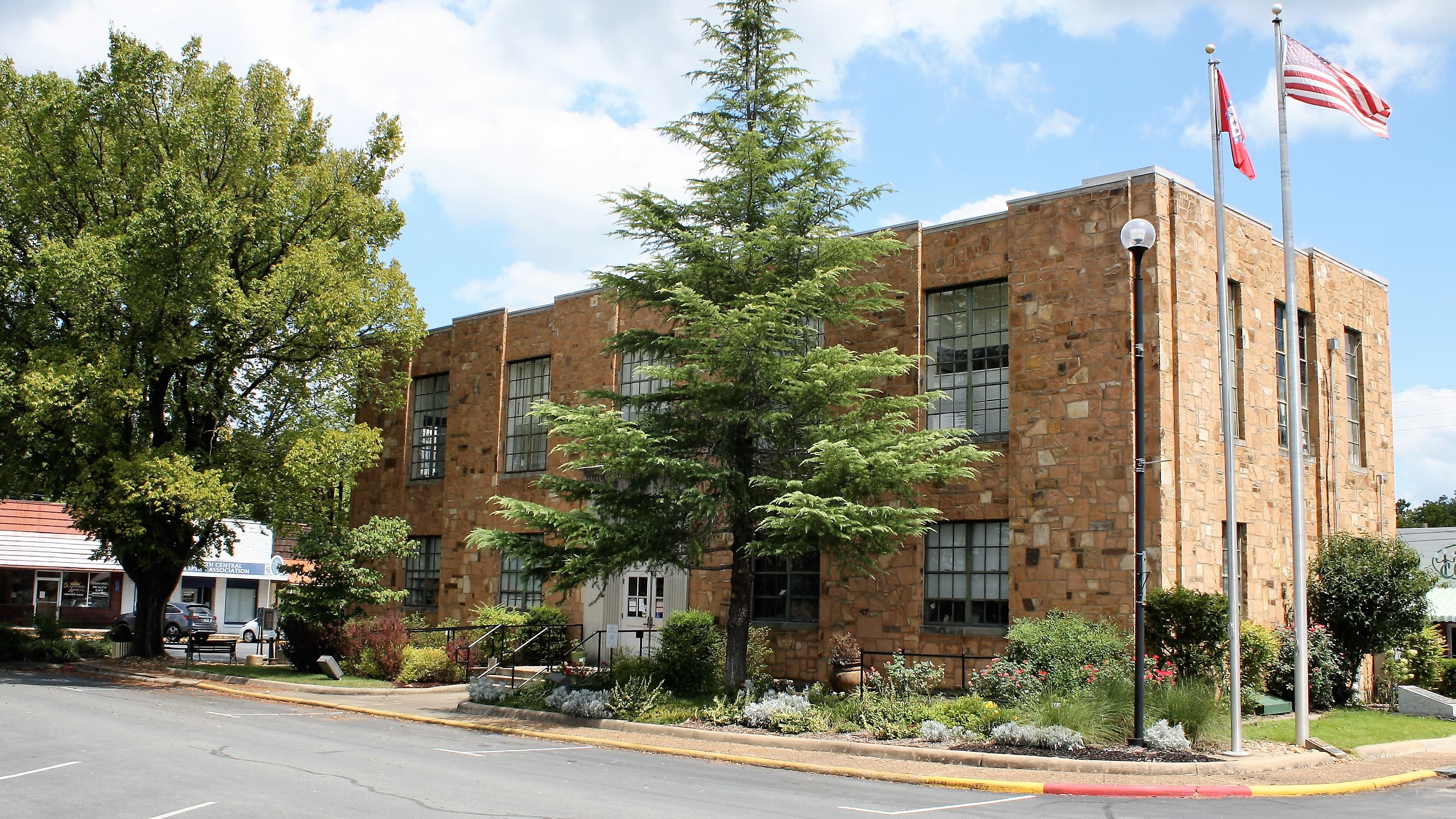
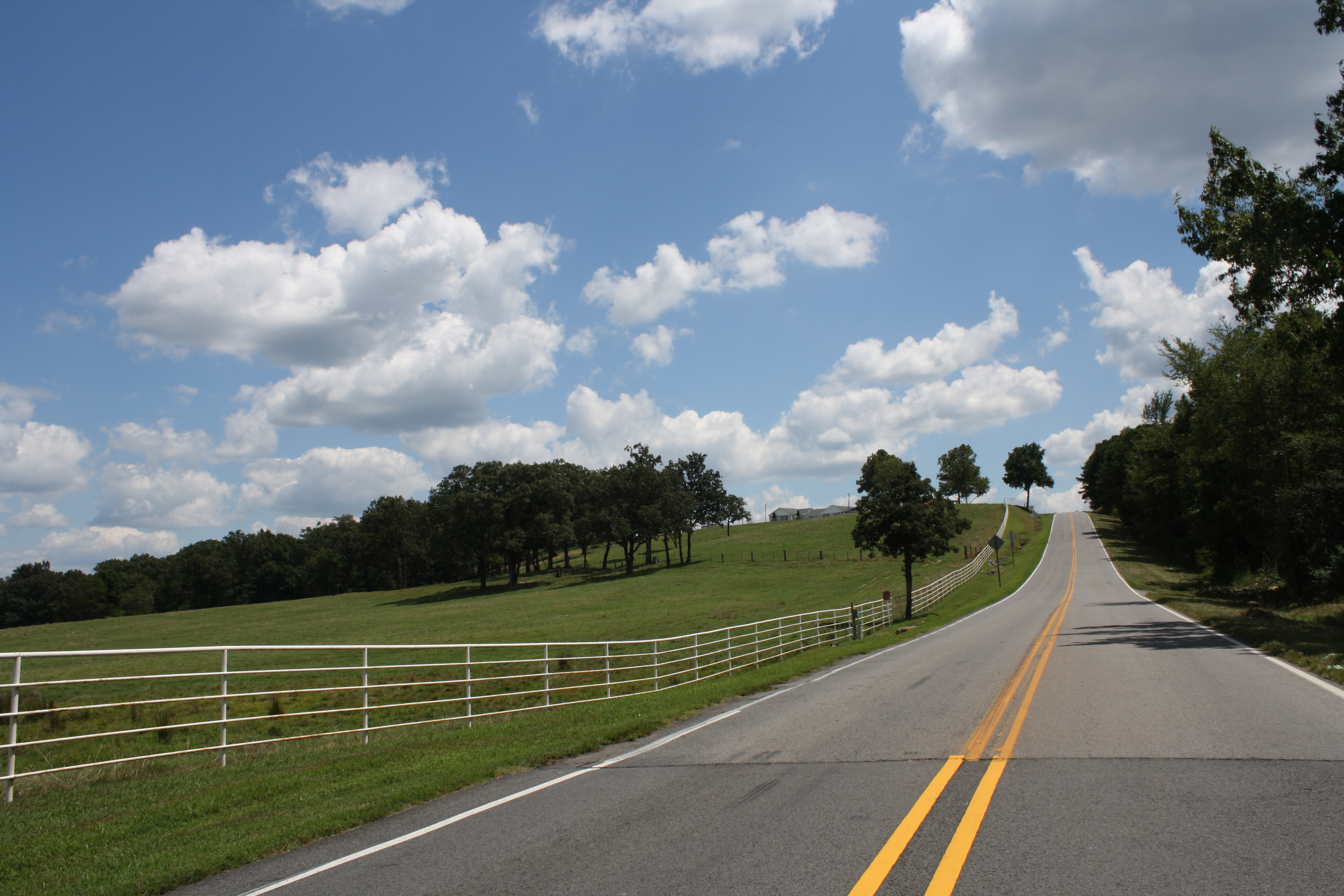
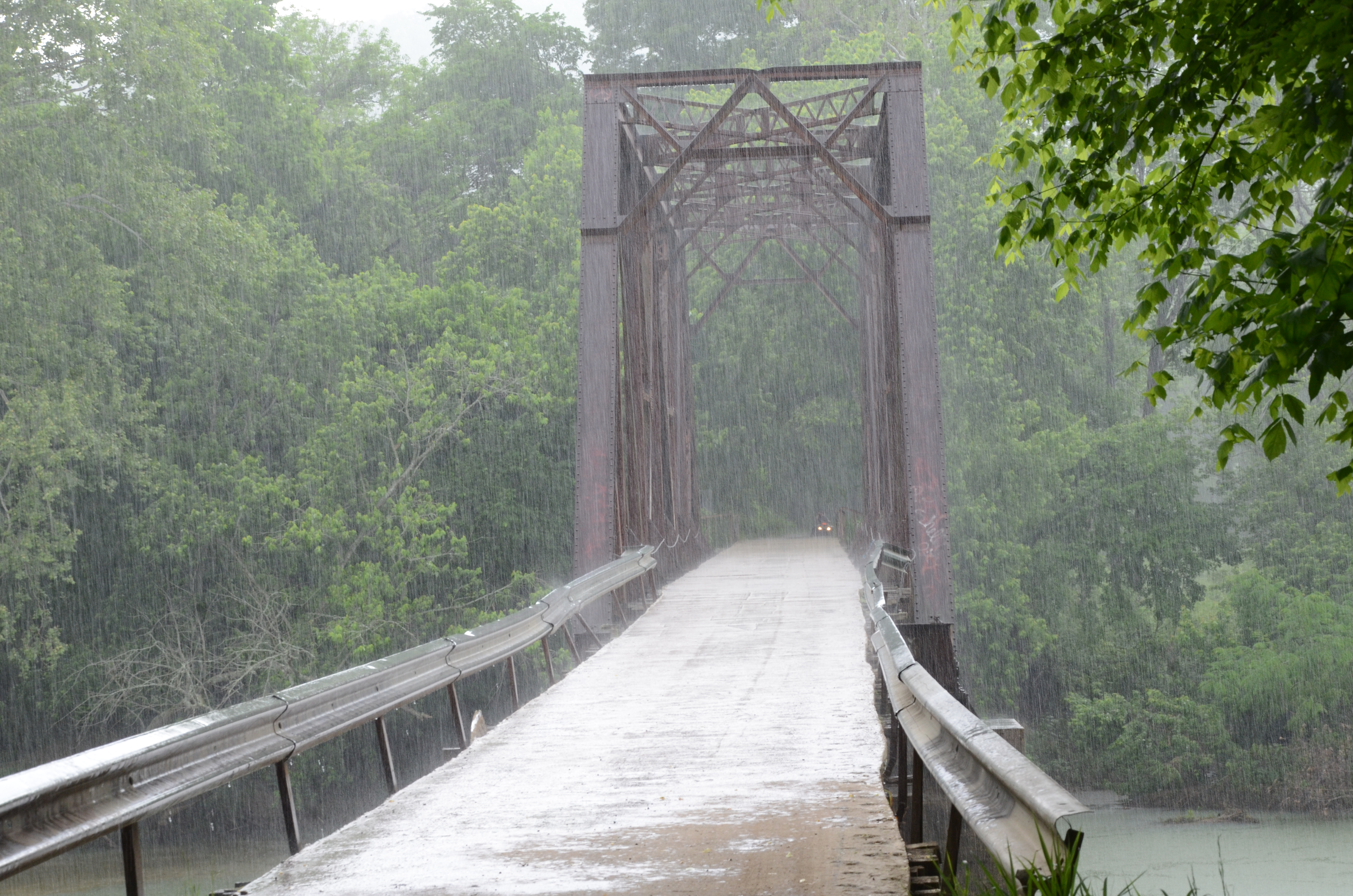
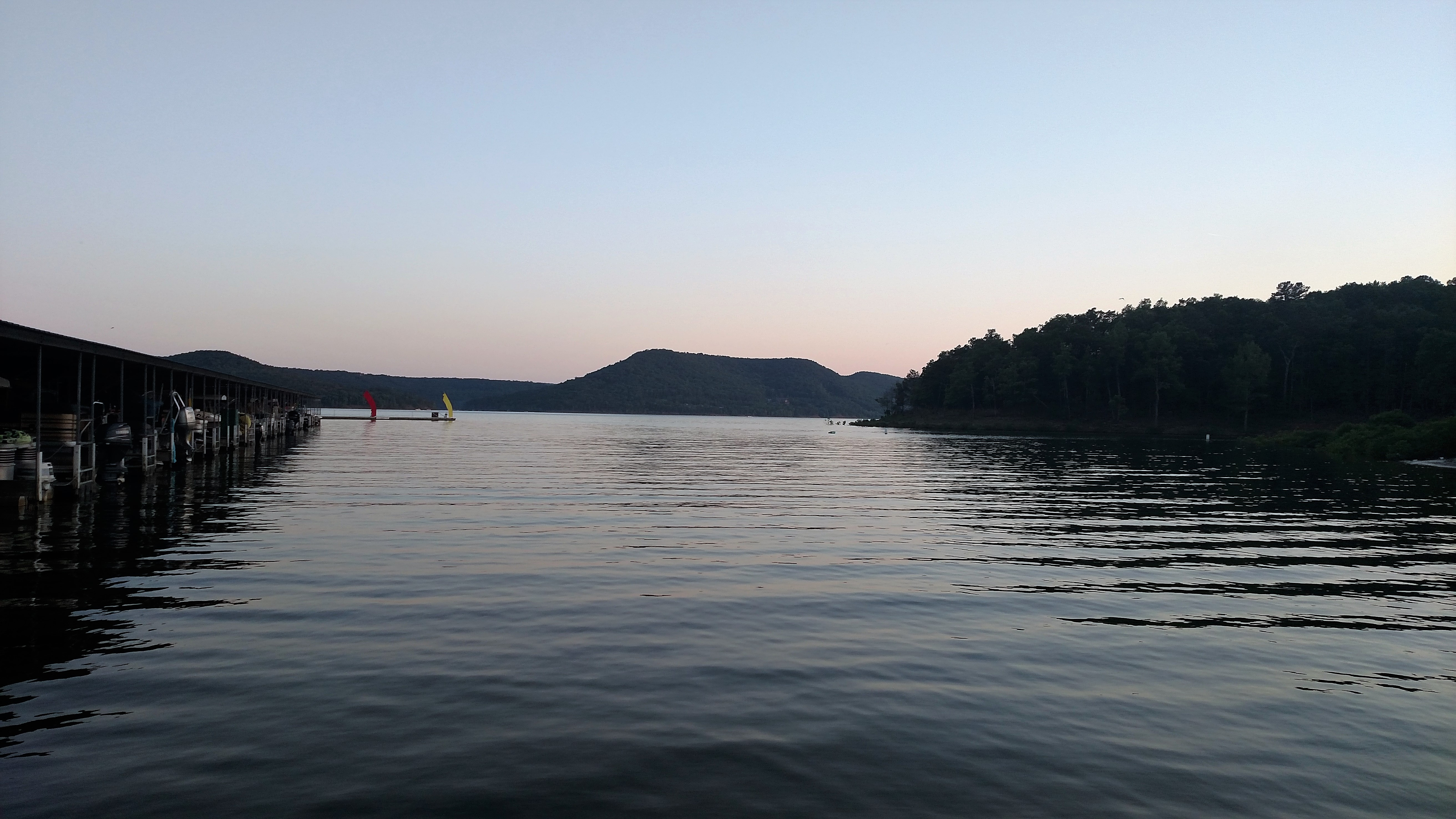
- Clockwise from top: Van Buren County Courthouse in downtown Clinton, Middle Fork of the Little Red River Bridge, Greers Ferry Lake at Fairfield Bay, a hill near Bee Branch

- Location within the U.S. state of Arkansas
- Coordinates: 35°36′01″N 92°29′28″W
- Country: United States
- State: Arkansas
- Founded: November 11, 1833
- Named for: Martin Van Buren
- Seat: Clinton
- Largest city: Clinton

Area
  - Total: 724 sq mi (1,880 km^{2})
  - Land: 708 sq mi (1,830 km^{2})
  - Water: 16 sq mi (41 km^{2}) 2.2%

Population (2020)
  - Total: 15,796
  - Estimate (2025): 16,238 ▲
  - Density: 22.3/sq mi (8.61/km^{2})
- Time zone: UTC−6 (Central)
  - Summer (DST): UTC−5 (CDT)
- Congressional district: 2nd
- Website: www.vanburencountyar.gov

Van Buren County is a county located in the U.S. state of Arkansas. As of the 2020 census, the population was 15,796. The county seat is Clinton. The county was formed on November 11, 1833, and named for Martin Van Buren, President of the United States, who was Vice President at the time of the county's formation. Van Buren County was a dry county until November 3, 2020, as the county residents voted to make it a wet county. Van Buren County, not be confused with the city of Van Buren, which is located approximately 100 miles to the west in Crawford County just north of Fort Smith.

== Geography ==
According to the U.S. Census Bureau, the county has a total area of 724 square miles (1,880 km^{2}), of which 708 square miles (1,830 km^{2}) is land and 16 square miles (41 km^{2}) (2.2%) is water.

=== Major highways ===
- U.S. Highway 65
- Arkansas Highway 9
- Arkansas Highway 16
- Arkansas Highway 27
- Arkansas Highway 92
- Arkansas Highway 95
- Arkansas Highway 110
- Arkansas Highway 124
- Arkansas Highway 254
- Arkansas Highway 285
- Arkansas Highway 330
- Arkansas Highway 336
- Arkansas Highway 337
- Arkansas Highway 356
- Arkansas Highway 980

=== Transit ===
- Jefferson Lines

=== Adjacent counties ===
- Searcy County (north)
- Stone County (northeast)
- Cleburne County (east)
- Faulkner County (southeast)
- Conway County (southwest)
- Pope County (west)

=== National protected area ===
- Ozark National Forest (part)

== Demographics ==
Historical population
Census	Pop.	Note	%±
1840	1,518		—
1850	2,864		88.7%
1860	5,357		87.0%
1870	5,107		−4.7%
1880	9,565		87.3%
1890	8,567		−10.4%
1900	11,220		31.0%
1910	13,509		20.4%
1920	13,666		1.2%
1930	11,962		−12.5%
1940	12,518		4.6%
1950	9,687		−22.6%
1960	7,228		−25.4%
1970	8,275		14.5%
1980	13,357		61.4%
1990	14,008		4.9%
2000	16,192		15.6%
2010	17,295		6.8%
2020	15,796		−8.7%
2025 (est.)	16,238	▲	2.8%
U.S. Decennial Census; 1790–1960 1900–1990; 1990–2000 2010

=== 2020 census ===
As of the 2020 census, the county had a population of 15,796. The median age was 50.2 years. 19.1% of residents were under the age of 18 and 27.2% of residents were 65 years of age or older. For every 100 females there were 98.0 males, and for every 100 females age 18 and over there were 96.5 males age 18 and over.

The racial makeup of the county was 91.7% White, 0.5% Black or African American, 0.8% American Indian and Alaska Native, 0.4% Asian, <0.1% Native Hawaiian and Pacific Islander, 1.3% from some other race, and 5.3% from two or more races. Hispanic or Latino residents of any race comprised 3.2% of the population.

<0.1% of residents lived in urban areas, while 100.0% lived in rural areas.

There were 7,012 households in the county, of which 23.1% had children under the age of 18 living in them. Of all households, 49.2% were married-couple households, 19.9% were households with a male householder and no spouse or partner present, and 26.1% were households with a female householder and no spouse or partner present. About 32.3% of all households were made up of individuals and 18.1% had someone living alone who was 65 years of age or older.

There were 9,668 housing units, of which 27.5% were vacant. Among occupied housing units, 79.8% were owner-occupied and 20.2% were renter-occupied. The homeowner vacancy rate was 2.9% and the rental vacancy rate was 10.6%.

=== 2000 census ===
As of the 2000 census, there were 16,192 people, 6,825 households, and 4,804 families residing in the county. The population density was 23 people per square mile (8.9 people/km^{2}). There were 9,164 housing units at an average density of 13 units per square mile (5.0 units/km^{2}). The racial makeup of the county was 96.79% White, 0.31% Black or African American, 0.75% Native American, 0.25% Asian, 0.04% Pacific Islander, 0.37% from other races, and 1.48% from two or more races. 1.33% of the population were Hispanic or Latino of any race, but the percentage could increased 3 or 4 times by seasonal migrant laborers in the county's shiitake mushroom harvest and hospitality jobs provided by the Fairfield Bay resort hotel.

There were 6,825 households, out of which 25.20% had children under the age of 18 living with them, 59.10% were married couples living together, 7.70% had a female householder with no husband present, and 29.60% were non-families. 26.40% of all households were made up of individuals, and 14.40% had someone living alone who was 65 years of age or older. The average household size was 2.33 and the average family size was 2.79.

In the county, the population was spread out, with 21.50% under the age of 18, 6.60% from 18 to 24, 23.00% from 25 to 44, 25.50% from 45 to 64, and 23.30% who were 65 years of age or older. The median age was 44 years. For every 100 females there were 96.70 males. For every 100 females age 18 and over, there were 93.00 males.

The median income for a household in the county was $27,004, and the median income for a family was $32,284. Males had a median income of $25,821 versus $18,862 for females. The per capita income for the county was $16,603. About 11.60% of families and 15.40% of the population were below the poverty line, including 21.90% of those under age 18 and 10.60% of those age 65 or over.

== Government ==
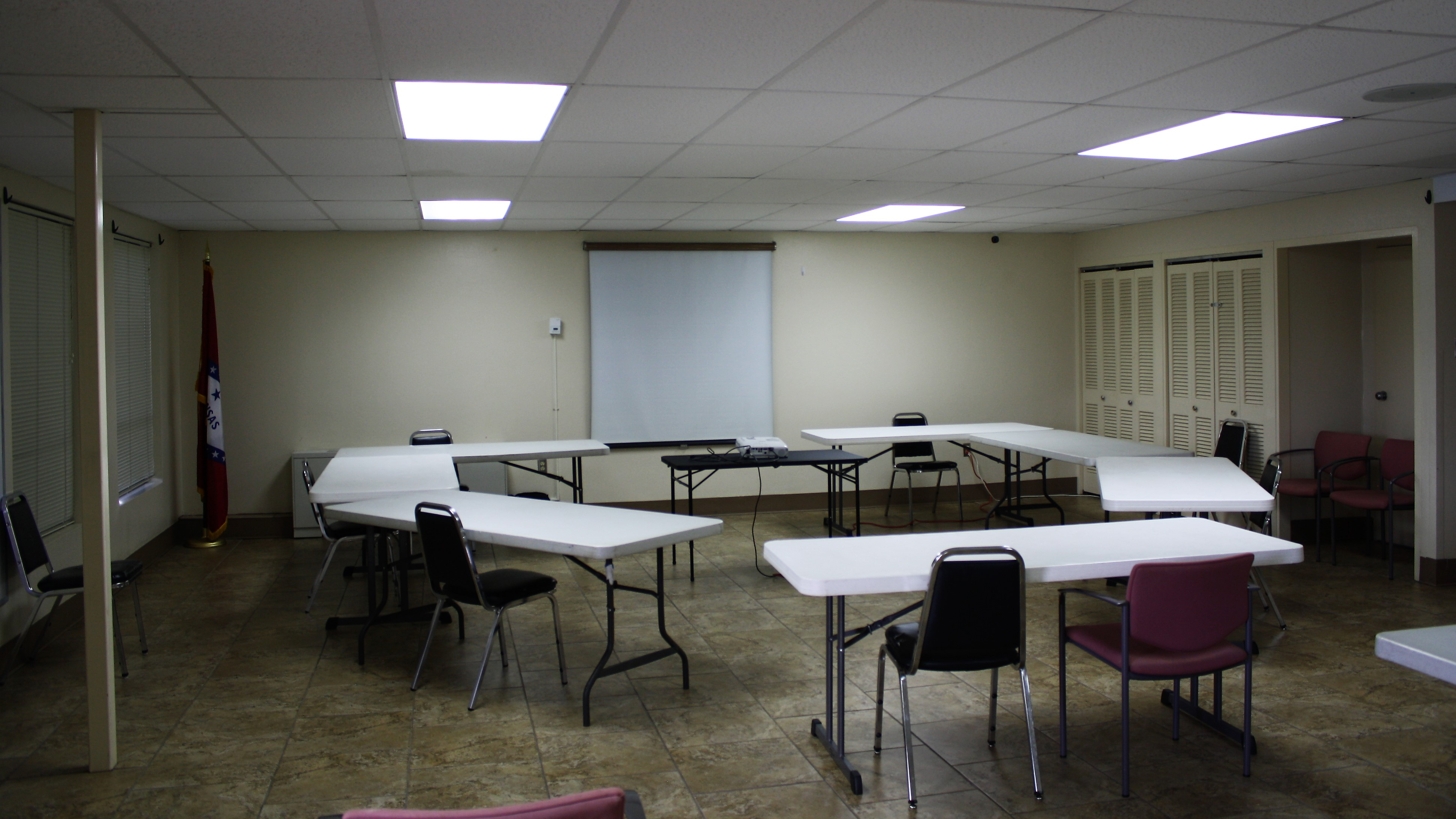
The Van Buren County Quorum Court meets at the courthouse annex, 1414 Hwy. 65 South in Clinton

The county government is a constitutional body granted specific powers by the Constitution of Arkansas and the Arkansas Code. The quorum court is the legislative branch of the county government and controls all spending and revenue collection. Representatives are called justices of the peace and are elected from county districts every even-numbered year. The number of districts in a county vary from nine to fifteen, and district boundaries are drawn by the county election commission. The Van Buren County Quorum Court has nine members. Presiding over quorum court meetings is the county judge, who serves as the chief operating officer of the county. The county judge is elected at-large and does not vote in quorum court business, although capable of vetoing quorum court decisions.

Van Buren County, Arkansas Elected countywide officials
Position	Officeholder	Party
County Judge	Dale James	Republican
County Clerk	Pam Bradford	Republican
Circuit Clerk	Debbie Gray	Republican
Sheriff	Eric Koonce	Republican
Treasurer	Mistie Wilson	Republican
Collector	Laura Shannon	Republican
Assessor	Emma R. Smiley	Republican
Coroner	Joe Tsosie	Republican

The composition of the Quorum Court following the 2024 elections is 7 Republicans and 2 Independents. Justices of the Peace (members) of the Quorum Court following the elections are:

- District 1: David Holcomb (R)
- District 2: Nickie Brown (Independent)
- District 3: Sarah Brown (R)
- District 4: Mary Philips (R)
- District 5: Michael Bradford (R)
- District 6: Bailee Fowler Roberson (R)
- District 7: Becky Page (R)
- District 8: Virgil Lemings (R)
- District 9: Ester Bass (I)

Additionally, the townships of Van Buren County are entitled to elect their own respective constables, as set forth by the Constitution of Arkansas. Constables are largely of historical significance as they were used to keep the peace in rural areas when travel was more difficult. The township constables as of the 2024 elections are:

- Archey Valley: Steven R. Bannick (R)
- Bradley: William Fosse (R)
- Culpepper: Scott Bramlett (R)
- East Griggs: William Fosko (R)
- Holly Mountain: Rance Dean (R)
- Red River: Devon Laubenthal (I)
- Union: Allen Dale Roberson (R)
- Washington: Thomas Bryan Turcol (Libertarian)

== Politics ==
Over the past few election cycles Van Buren County, like all of the traditionally secessionist and Democratic Upland South, has trended heavily towards the GOP. The last Democrat to carry this county was Bill Clinton in 1996.

United States presidential election results for Van Buren County, Arkansas
Year	Republican		Democratic		Third party(ies)	
Year	No.	%	No.	%	No.	%
1896	374	30.02%	846	67.90%	26	2.09%
1900	445	40.90%	599	55.06%	44	4.04%
1904	542	46.17%	578	49.23%	54	4.60%
1908	667	42.38%	797	50.64%	110	6.99%
1912	254	19.94%	674	52.90%	346	27.16%
1916	743	36.87%	1,272	63.13%	0	0.00%
1920	1,388	72.98%	440	23.13%	74	3.89%
1924	435	30.12%	922	63.85%	87	6.02%
1928	994	39.18%	1,539	60.66%	4	0.16%
1932	413	21.85%	1,456	77.04%	21	1.11%
1936	541	27.48%	1,422	72.22%	6	0.30%
1940	402	27.35%	1,068	72.65%	0	0.00%
1944	655	37.49%	1,090	62.39%	2	0.11%
1948	617	29.81%	1,324	63.96%	129	6.23%
1952	1,530	49.32%	1,559	50.26%	13	0.42%
1956	1,296	49.05%	1,331	50.38%	15	0.57%
1960	1,009	44.51%	1,158	51.08%	100	4.41%
1964	1,270	37.89%	2,054	61.28%	28	0.84%
1968	1,325	35.83%	1,149	31.07%	1,224	33.10%
1972	2,622	61.91%	1,594	37.64%	19	0.45%
1976	1,624	28.86%	4,004	71.14%	0	0.00%
1980	3,090	49.11%	2,968	47.17%	234	3.72%
1984	4,060	60.97%	2,529	37.98%	70	1.05%
1988	3,562	57.37%	2,607	41.99%	40	0.64%
1992	2,612	35.48%	3,819	51.88%	930	12.63%
1996	2,345	34.48%	3,521	51.77%	935	13.75%
2000	3,485	49.90%	3,202	45.85%	297	4.25%
2004	3,988	54.08%	3,310	44.89%	76	1.03%
2008	4,276	63.79%	2,151	32.09%	276	4.12%
2012	4,365	67.88%	1,832	28.49%	233	3.62%
2016	5,382	73.33%	1,549	21.11%	408	5.56%
2020	6,034	77.29%	1,593	20.40%	180	2.31%
2024	6,023	79.03%	1,437	18.86%	161	2.11%

== Communities ==
=== Cities ===
- Clinton (county seat)
- Fairfield Bay (partly in Cleburne County)

=== Towns ===
- Damascus (partly in Faulkner County)
- Shirley

=== Census-designated place ===
- Bee Branch
- Dennard

=== Other unincorporated communities ===
- Alread
- Archey Valley
- Austin
- Botkinburg
- Chimes
- Choctaw
- Choctaw Pines
- Claude
- Copeland
- Crabtree
- Culpepper
- Dabney
- Eglantine
- Elba
- Fairbanks
- Formosa
- Gravesville
- Gravel Hill
- Green Tree
- Half Moon
- Morganton
- Old Botkinburg
- Palisades
- Pee Dee
- Plant
- Pleasant Grove
- Rabbit Ridge
- Rex
- Rocky Hill
- Rumley
- Rupert
- Scotland
- Southside
- Stumptoe
- Sulphur Springs
- Walnut Grove
- Whipple
- Woodlum
- Zion Hill

=== Townships ===
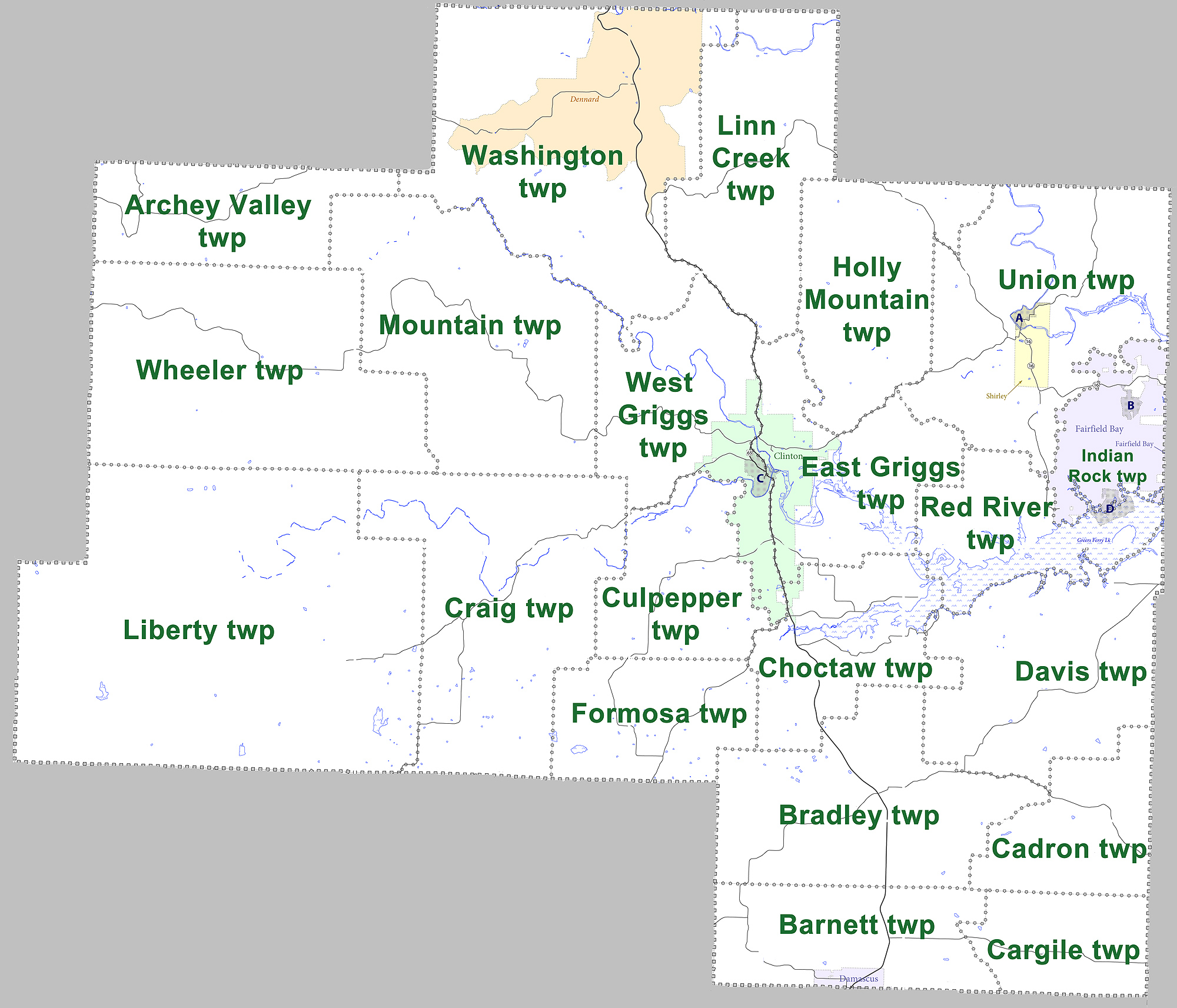
Townships in Van Buren County, Arkansas, as of 2010

Townships in Arkansas are the divisions of a county. Each township includes unincorporated areas; some may have incorporated cities or towns within part of their boundaries. Arkansas townships have limited purposes in modern times. However, the United States census does list Arkansas population based on townships (sometimes referred to as "county subdivisions" or "minor civil divisions"). Townships are also of value for historical purposes in terms of genealogical research. Each town or city is within one or more townships in an Arkansas county based on census maps and publications. The townships of Van Buren County are listed below; listed in parentheses are the cities, towns, and/or census-designated places that are fully or partially inside the township.

Township	FIPS code	ANSI code (GNIS ID)	Population center(s)	Pop. (2010)	Pop. density (/mi^{2})	Pop. density (/km^{2})	Total area (mi^{2})	Total area (km^{2})	Land area (mi^{2})	Land area (km^{2})	Water area (mi^{2})	Water area (km^{2})	Geographic coordinates
Archey Valley	05-90054	00069759		144	6.40	2.47	22.532	58.36	22.492	58.25	0.040	0.1036	35.708846°N 92.747601°W
Barnett	05-90117	00069760	Damascus	786	32.49	12.54	24.204	62.69	24.192	62.66	0.012	0.03108	35.384917°N 92.402125°W
Bradley	05-90444	00069761		1,237	32.83	12.68	37.744	97.76	37.674	97.58	0.070	0.1813	35.449518°N 92.408575°W
Cadron	05-90603	00069762		160	8.92	3.44	17.952	46.50	17.942	46.47	0.010	0.02590	35.425448°N 92.291417°W
Cargile	05-90660	00069763		395	26.72	10.32	14.783	38.29	14.783	38.29	0	0.000	35.386683°N 92.296239°W
Choctaw	05-90789	00069764	Clinton (small part)	1,226	58.20	22.47	23.244	60.20	21.066	54.56	2.178	5.641	35.516962°N 92.411879°W
Craig	05-90951	00069765		739	15.19	5.87	48.926	126.7	48.655	126.0	0.271	0.7019	35.532364°N 92.595865°W
Culpepper	05-90987	00069766		362	17.65	6.82	20.653	53.49	20.506	53.11	0.147	0.3807	35.533776°N 92.501491°W
Davis	05-91035	00069767		892	24.70	9.54	36.497	94.53	36.113	93.53	0.384	0.9946	35.505081°N 92.321515°W
East Griggs	05-91200	01986408	Clinton	1,544	66.04	25.50	25.579	66.25	23.381	60.56	2.198	5.693	35.589205°N 92.414398°W
Formosa	05-91318	01986409		675	33.13	12.79	20.576	53.29	20.377	52.78	0.199	0.5154	35.483299°N 92.513431°W
Holly Mountain (fka Holley)	05-91750	01986410		523	18.21	9.91	28.764	74.50	28.721	74.39	0.043	0.1114	35.676084°N 92.392866°W
Indian Rock	05-91830	00069771	Fairfield Bay	2,227	160.85	62.10	13.914	36.04	13.845	35.86	0.069	0.1787	35.605484°N 92.271560°W
Liberty	05-92190	00069772		240	2.47	0.95	97.551	252.7	97.076	251.4	0.475	1.230	35.519567°N 92.734438°W
Linn Creek	05-92214	00069773		655	19.35	7.47	33.982	88.01	33.847	87.66	0.135	0.3496	35.727767°N 92.445080°W
Mountain	05-92610	00069774		390	8.30	3.20	47.047	121.9	46.979	121.7	0.068	0.1761	35.644145°N 92.610209°W
Red River	05-93093	00069775		447	40.90	15.80	19.664	50.93	10.928	28.30	8.736	22.63	35.567744°N 92.323027°W
Union	05-93729	00069776	Shirley	1,497	33.68	13.01	45.153	116.9	44.448	115.1	0.705	1.826	35.658887°N 92.307660°W
Washington	05-93933	00069777	Dennard	850	13.82	5.34	61.634	159.6	61.484	159.2	0.150	0.3885	35.730788°N 92.559088°W
West Griggs	05-93970	01986411	Clinton	1,970	67.78	26.17	29.271	75.81	29.069	75.29	0.202	0.5232	35.600847°N 92.502416°W
Wheeler	05-93984	00069778		336	6.16	2.38	54.614	141.4	54.566	141.3	0.048	0.1243	35.624497°N 92.720771°W
Source: U.S. Census Bureau

== Education ==
School districts include:

- Clinton School District
- Quitman School District
- Searcy County School District
- Shirley School District
- South Side-Bee Branch School District
- West Side School District

== See also ==
- Arkansas Highway 336 (1965–2013), former state highway in Van Buren County
- List of lakes in Van Buren County, Arkansas
- National Register of Historic Places listings in Van Buren County, Arkansas
