= Arkansas Highway 105 =

State highway in Arkansas, United States

Highway 105

Route information
- Maintained by ArDOT
- Length: 24.874 mi (40.031 km)
- Existed: April 1, 1926–present

Major junctions
- South end: Galla Creek Wildlife Management Area
- US 64 in Atkins; I-40 / AR 363 in Atkins
- North end: AR 27 in Hector

Location
- Country: United States
- State: Arkansas
- Counties: Pope

Highway system
- Arkansas Highway System; Interstate; US; State; Business; Spurs; Suffixed; Scenic; Heritage
← AR 104	→ AR 106

Highway 105 (AR 105, Ark. 105, and Hwy. 105) is a north–south state highway in Pope County, Arkansas. The route runs from Galla Creek Wildlife Management Area north across Interstate 40 (I-40) and U.S. Route 64 (US 64) to Highway 27 in Hector. AR 105 was created during the 1926 Arkansas state highway numbering. The route is maintained by the Arkansas Department of Transportation (ArDOT).

== Route description ==
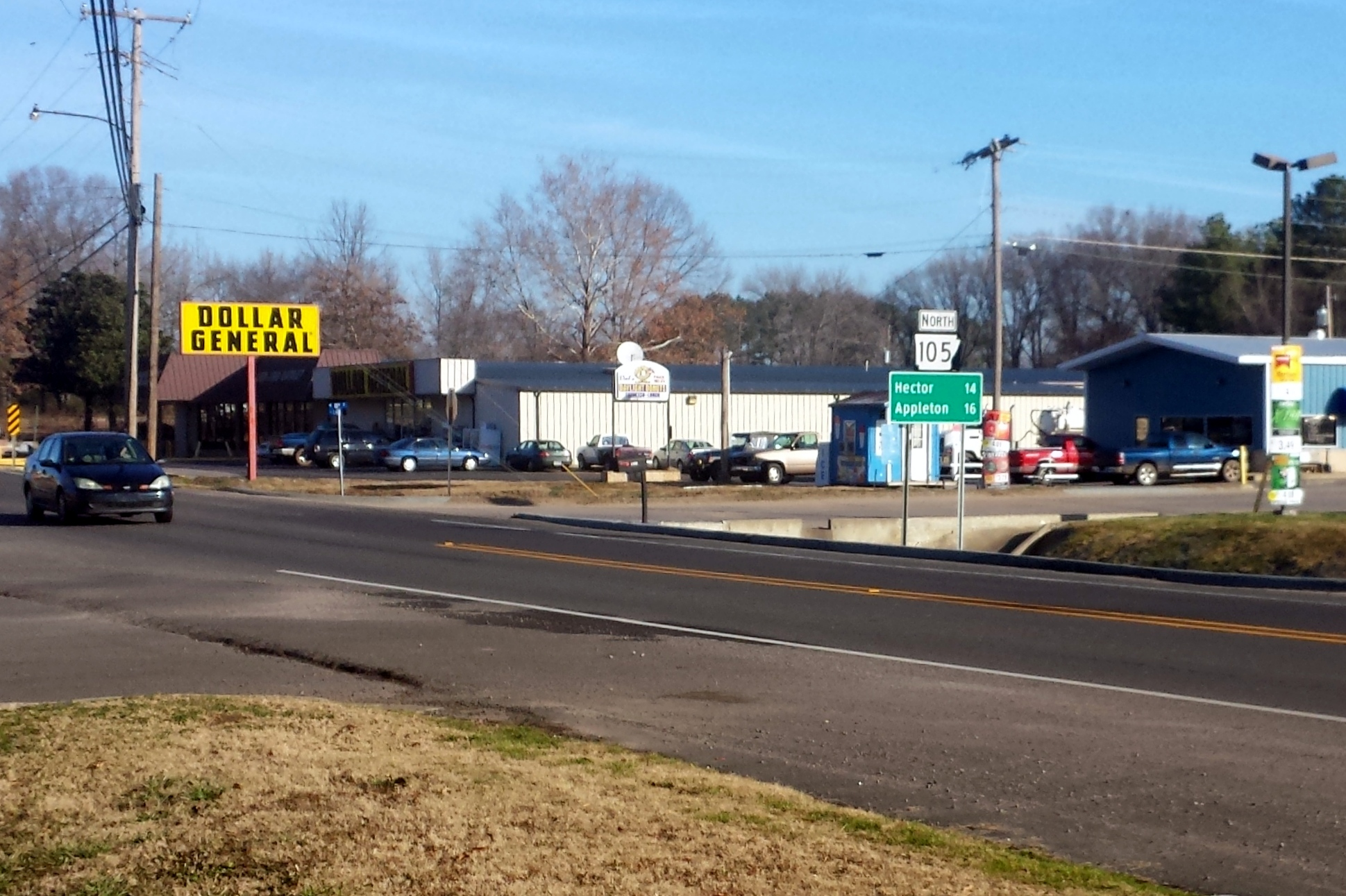
Highway 105 runs north in Atkins

The route begins in southern Pope County at Galla Creek Wildlife Management Area (WMA) near the Arkansas River and runs north through Atkins. The highway has a two-block concurrency with US 64 west in downtown Atkins beginning near the Missouri Pacific Depot, which is listed on the National Register of Historic Places. Highway 105 turns north and runs along the Atkins Commercial Historic District and passes the district headquarters of Atkins Public Schools before an interchange with I-40. The route serves as the eastern terminus of Highway 363 north of I-40 and the western terminus of Highway 247 further north. The highway continues to wind north to serve as the eastern terminus of Highway 164 before an overlap with Highway 124. Highway 105 terminates in Hector at Highway 27.

The ARDOT maintains Highway 105 like all other parts of the state highway system. As a part of these responsibilities, the Department tracks the volume of traffic using its roads in surveys using a metric called average annual daily traffic (AADT). ARDOT estimates the traffic level for a segment of roadway for any average day of the year in these surveys. As of 2022, AADT was estimated as 130 vehicles per day (VPD) near the southern terminus, 6,600 in Atkins, 8,800 VPD at the I-40 overpass, 2,700 VPD at AR 124, and 1,700 near Hector.

No segment of Highway 105 has been listed as part of the National Highway System, a network of roads important to the nation's economy, defense, and mobility.

== History ==
Highway 105 was created during the 1926 Arkansas state highway numbering, making it one of the original state highways. State Road 105 initially ran between Hector and Atkins, but was extended south near the Arkansas River on August 25, 1940. (Note: Per handwritten note on 1936-1939 Pope County map.)

== Major intersections ==
Mile markers reset at some concurrencies. The entire route is in Pope County.

Location	mi	km	Destinations	Notes
Galla Creek WMA	0.000	0.000	Begin state maintenance	Southern terminus
Gold Hill	4.38	7.05	AR 324 east	
Atkins	9.11	14.66	AR 324 west (SW 3rd Street)	
Atkins	9.283– 0.000	14.940– 0.000	US 64 (Main Street) – Morrilton, Conway, Russellville	
Atkins	0.79– 0.96	1.27– 1.54	I-40 / AR 363 west – Little Rock, Fort Smith	Eastern terminus of AR 363; exit 94 on I-40
	2.39	3.85	AR 247 east – Saint Vincent	
	5.37	8.64	AR 326 west	
Oak Grove	8.54	13.74	AR 164 west – Moreland	
Caglesville	11.49	18.49	AR 124 west – Russellville	South end of AR 124 overlap
	12.20	19.63	AR 124 east – Appleton	North end of AR 124 overlap
Hector	15.591	25.091	AR 27 – Hector, Dover	Northern terminus
1.000 mi = 1.609 km; 1.000 km = 0.621 mi: Concurrency terminus
