= Arkansas Highway 326 =

State highway in Arkansas, United States

Highway 326

Route information
- Maintained by ArDOT
- Existed: June 1965–present

Section 1
- Length: 9.96 mi (16.03 km)
- CCW end: AR 7 / AR 7T in Russellville
- CW end: AR 7 in Russellville

Section 2
- Length: 6.52 mi (10.49 km)
- West end: AR 124 at Gum Log
- East end: AR 105

Location
- Country: United States
- State: Arkansas
- Counties: Pope

Highway system
- Arkansas Highway System; Interstate; US; State; Business; Spurs; Suffixed; Scenic; Heritage
← AR 325	→ AR 327

Highway 326 (AR 326, Ark. 326, and Hwy. 326) is a designation for two state highways in Pope County. One route of 9.96 miles (16.03 km) in Russellville begins at Highway 7 and Highway 7T and runs northeast to Highway 7. A second route of 6.52 miles (10.49 km) begins at Highway 124 and runs east to Highway 105. All routes are maintained by the Arkansas State Highway and Transportation Department (AHTD).

== Route description ==
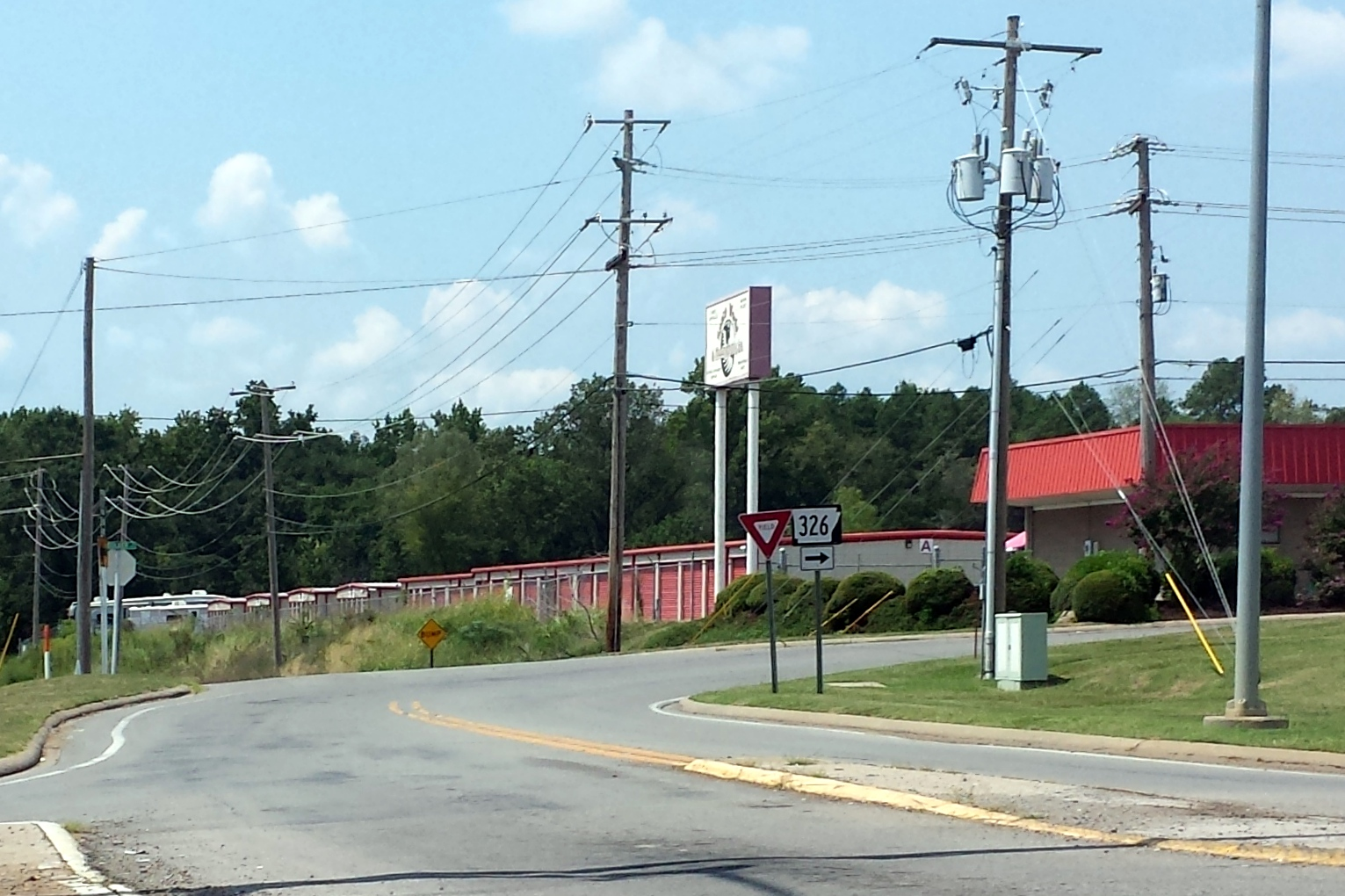
Highway 326 eastern terminus at Highway 7

=== Western section ===
The route begins at Highway 7 at the intersection with Highway 7T in south Russellville. Highway 326 runs west past the Confederate Mothers Memorial Park and the Mountain View School to Lake Dardanelle State Park, and continues north along the shore of Lake Dardanelle. The route concurs briefly with U.S. Route 64 (US 64) near Washburn Park, after which it runs east to meet AR 7, where the western section terminates.

=== Eastern section ===
The eastern section of Highway 326 begins at Highway 124 near the community of Gum Log and runs east to Highway 105, where the highway terminates. This segment of Highway 326 does not cross or concur with any other highways.

== History ==
Highway 326 was first created by the Arkansas State Highway Commission on June 23, 1965 between US 64 and Skyline Drive in Russellville. A second route was created on October 27, 1965 between US 64 and Highway 124, as it exists today. In 1973, the Arkansas General Assembly passed Act 9 of 1973. The act directed county judges and legislators to designate up to 12 miles (19 km) of county roads as state highways in each county. As a result of this legislation, a third segment of Highway 326 was designated on May 23, 1973 between Gum Log and Highway 105.

The segment in Russellville was extended on May 23, 1979 between US 64 and Highway 7. The ASHC adopted a United States Army Corps of Engineers levee road constructed along the Illinois Bayou arm of Lake Dardanelle into the state highway system. Highway 326 was extended south from Skyline Drive to its present southern terminus on August 13, 1980.

Formerly, there was a third middle section of 1.50 miles (2.41 km) along Weir Road, beginning at US 64 in Russellville and running north to Highway 124. That section is now part of Highway 124.

== Major intersections ==
Mile markers reset at concurrencies. The entire route is in Pope County.

Location	mi	km	Destinations	Notes
Russellville	0.00	0.00	AR 7 (Arkansas Avenue) / AR 7T north (Bernice Avenue)	Counterclockwise terminus; southern terminus of AR 7T
Russellville	8.06	12.97	US 64 east (West Main Street)	Counterclockwise end of US 64 overlap; serves St. Mary's Regional Medical Center
Russellville	0.00	0.00	US 64 west – Bona Dea Trails, Washburn Entrance	Clockwise end of US 64 overlap
Russellville	1.90	3.06	AR 7 (Arkansas Avenue) to I-40 – Dover, Russellville	Clockwise terminus
Gap in route
Gum Log	0.00	0.00	AR 124 – Russellville, Moreland	Western terminus
	6.52	10.49	AR 105 – Oak Grove, Atkins	Eastern terminus
1.000 mi = 1.609 km; 1.000 km = 0.621 mi: Concurrency terminus

== See also ==
- List of state highways in Arkansas
