= Arkansas Highway 324 =

State highway in Arkansas, United States

Highway 324

Route information
- Maintained by ArDOT
- Existed: June 23, 1965–present

Section 1
- Length: 0.76 mi (1,220 m)
- West end: Tyler Rd., Russellville
- East end: US 64

Section 2
- Length: 6.85 mi (11.02 km)
- West end: AR 105 at Gold Hill
- East end: AR 105 in Atkins

Section 3
- Length: 4.01 mi (6.45 km)
- West end: AR 155
- East end: AR 10

Section 4
- Length: 3.73 mi (6.00 km)
- West end: Lake Sylvia Recreational Area
- East end: AR 9

Location
- Country: United States
- State: Arkansas
- Counties: Pope, Perry

Highway system
- Arkansas Highway System; Interstate; US; State; Business; Spurs; Suffixed; Scenic; Heritage
← AR 323	→ AR 325

Highway 324 (AR 324, Ark. 324, and Hwy. 324) is a designation for four state highways in the Arkansas River Valley. One route of 0.76 miles (1.22 km) runs from US Highway 64 (US 64) to Tyler Road in Russellville. A second route of 6.85 miles (11.02 km) begins at Highway 105 and runs east around Lake Atkins to terminate at Highway 105. A third route of 4.01 miles (6.45 km) connects Highway 155 and Highway 10 in Perry County. A fourth segment connects Lake Sylvia Recreational Area in the Ouachita National Forest to Highway 9 and the state highway system. All routes are maintained by the Arkansas State Highway and Transportation Department (AHTD).

== Route description ==
=== Russellville ===
Highway 324 connects a Tyson Foods poultry plant and other industrial facilities to the Arkansas state highway system. It serves as a brief connector between the plant near Tyler Road and US 64 in Russellville.

=== Atkins ===
The route begins at AR 105 at Gold Hill and loops west around Lake Atkins through Bells Chapel. AR 324 terminates at AR 105 in south Atkins.

=== Perry County ===
Highway 324 serves as a connector route between Highway 155 south of Petit Jean State Park and Highway 10 near Adona, a major east-west route in the region.

=== Lake Sylvia Recreation Area ===
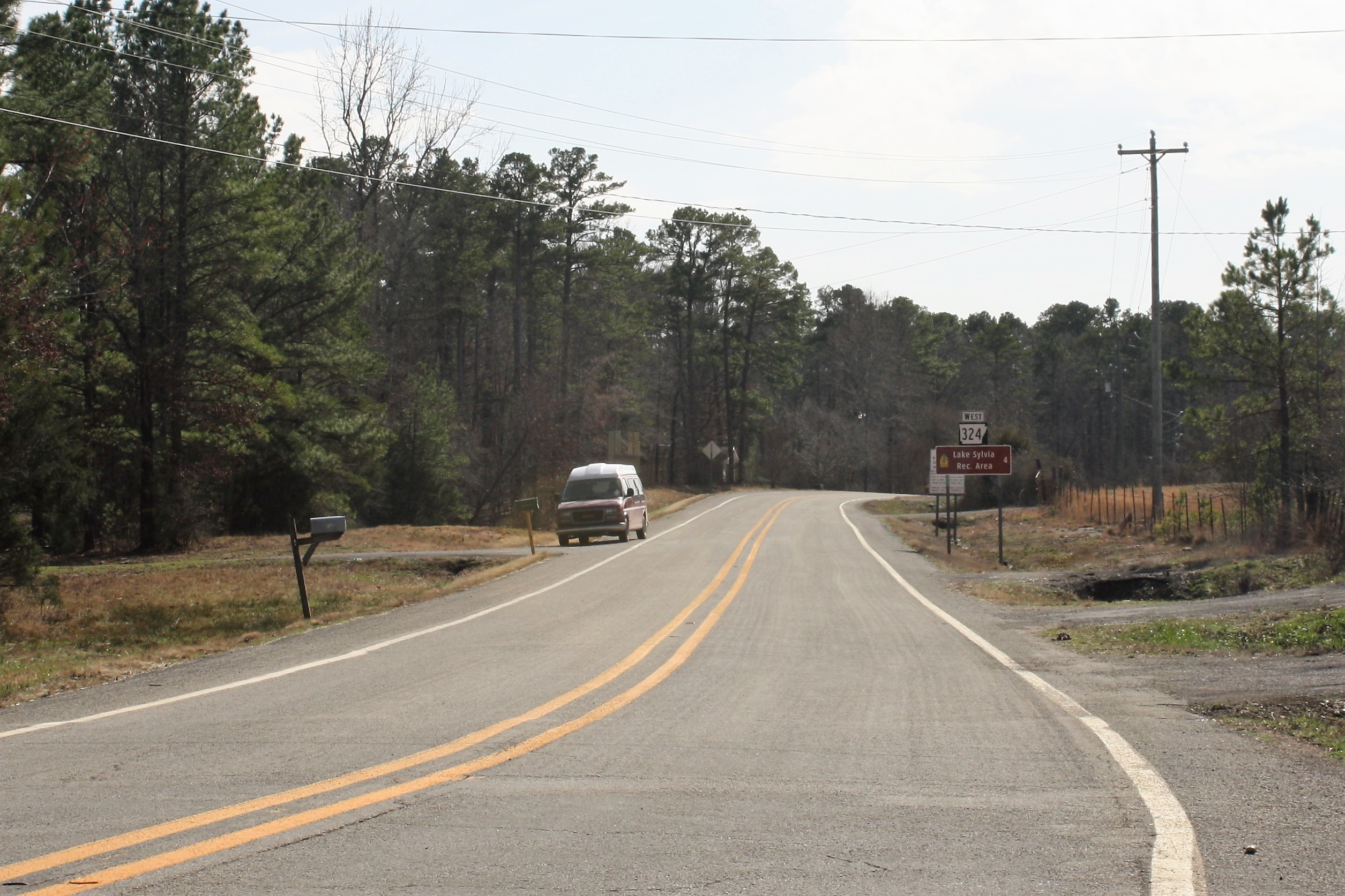
Westbound Highway 324 near Williams Junction

Highway 324 serves as a connector route to connect Lake Sylvia Recreational Area in the Ouachita National Forest to the state highway system.

== History ==
The Arkansas State Highway Commission created Highway 324 by designating a county road between Atkins and Galla Rock as a state highway on June 23, 1965. The sections in Perry County were added to the state highway system on April 24, 1973. The segment in Russellville was added to the state highway system on January 30, 1986 following a study of north-south traffic flow in the city. The roadway was created to connect the industrial area to the state highway system under a policy to provide connectivity between industrial areas and the state highway system.

== Major intersections ==
County	Location	mi	km	Destinations	Notes
Pope	Russellville	0.00	0.00	US 64 – Pottsville, Blackwell	Western terminus
Pope	Russellville	0.76	1.22	Tyler Road	Eastern terminus
Pope	Gap in route				
Pope	Gold Hill	0.00	0.00	AR 105	Western terminus
Pope	Atkins	6.85	11.02	AR 105 (Ave 2 SE) to I-40	Eastern terminus
Gap in route
Perry		0.00	0.00	AR 155	Western terminus
Perry		4.01	6.45	AR 10 – Ola, Adona	Eastern terminus
Perry	Gap in route				
Perry		0.00	0.00	Lake Sylvia Recreational Area	Western terminus
Perry		3.73	6.00	AR 9 – Benton	Eastern terminus
1.000 mi = 1.609 km; 1.000 km = 0.621 mi

== See also ==
- List of state highways in Arkansas
