= Auxiliary routes of Arkansas Highway 7 =

State highway in Arkansas, United States

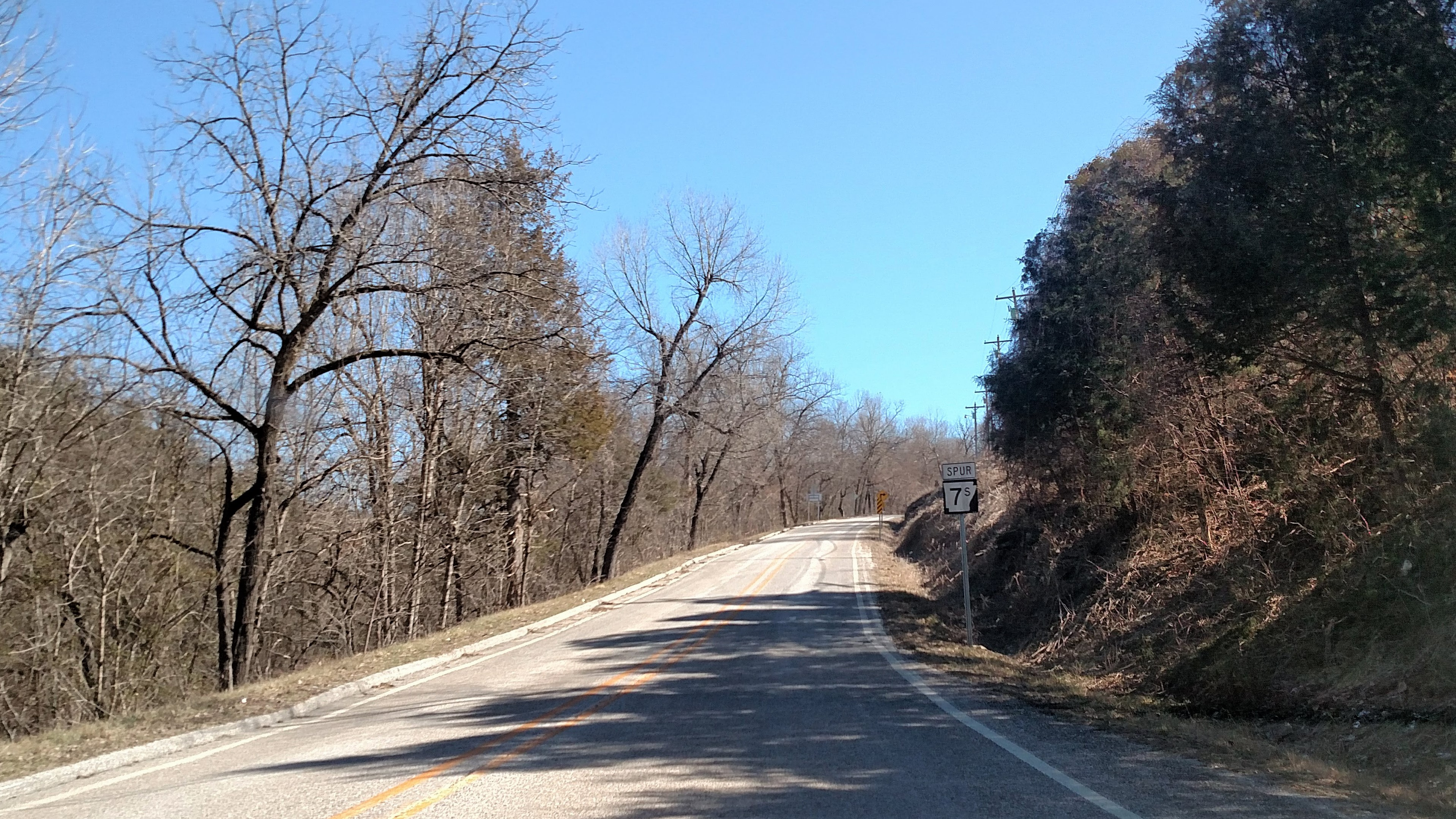
Highway 7S leads to Dogpatch USA

Six auxiliary routes of Arkansas Highway 7 currently exist. Four are spur routes, one is a business route, and one is a truck route. They are listed below in south-to-north order.

One former alternate route existed in Dallas County, replaced by Highway 128 in 1937.

== El Dorado spur ==
Highway 7S
- Location: El Dorado
- Length: 2.39 mi (3.85 km)
- Existed: August 25, 1971–present

Arkansas Highway 7 Spur is a spur route of 2.39 miles (3.85 km) in El Dorado. The highway runs from U.S. Route 167B (US 167B) north to Highway 7.

Major intersections

The entire route is in Union County.

Location	mi	km	Destinations	Notes
El Dorado	0.00	0.00	US 167B – El Dorado Business District	Southern terminus
	2.39	3.85	AR 7 – Camden, El Dorado, Smackover	Northern terminus
1.000 mi = 1.609 km; 1.000 km = 0.621 mi

== Smackover business route ==
Highway 7B
- Location: Smackover
- Length: 5.55 mi (8.93 km)
- Existed: October 28, 1976–present

Arkansas Highway 7 Business is a business loop of 5.55 miles (8.93 km) in Smackover. The route is known as Pershing Highway east of town, and West 7th Street west of town. Highway 7B passes the Smackover Historic Commercial District on the National Register of Historic Places.

Major intersections

The entire route is in Union County.

Location	mi	km	Destinations	Notes
	0.00	0.00	AR 7 – El Dorado, Camden	Southern terminus
Smackover	3.7	6.0	AR 160 west (Mount Holly Road)	Eastern terminus of AR 160
	5.6	9.0	AR 7 – El Dorado, Camden	Northern terminus
1.000 mi = 1.609 km; 1.000 km = 0.621 mi

== Hot Springs spur ==
Highway 7S
- Location: Hot Springs
- Length: 1.62 mi (2.61 km)
- Existed: November 17, 2004–present

Arkansas Highway 7 Spur is a spur route of 1.62 miles (2.61 km) in Hot Springs. The route is known as Gorge Road and is a former alignment of US 70B. It connects Highway 7 to the current US 70B and provides access to Gulpha Gorge Recreational Area.

Major intersections

The entire route is in Garland County.

Location	mi	km	Destinations	Notes
Hot Springs	0.00	0.00	US 70B – National Park Visitor Center, Little Rock	Southern terminus; exit 2 on US 70B
Hot Springs National Park	1.6	2.6	AR 7 to AR 5 – Hot Springs Business District, Hot Springs Village, Russellville	Northern terminus
1.000 mi = 1.609 km; 1.000 km = 0.621 mi

== Russellville spur ==
Highway 7S
- Location: Russellville
- Length: 1.40 mi (2.25 km)
- Existed: October 23, 1974–present

Arkansas Highway 7 Spur is a spur route of 1.40 miles (2.25 km) in Russellville. The route runs along International Paper Road and Lock & Dam Road. Highway 7S runs from the International Paper factory past Norristown Cemetery.

Major intersections

The entire route is in Russellville, Pope County.

mi	km	Destinations	Notes
1.40	2.25	International Paper Factory	Western terminus
0.00	0.00	AR 7 (Arkansas Avenue) – Russellville, Dardanelle	Eastern terminus
1.000 mi = 1.609 km; 1.000 km = 0.621 mi

== Russellville truck route ==
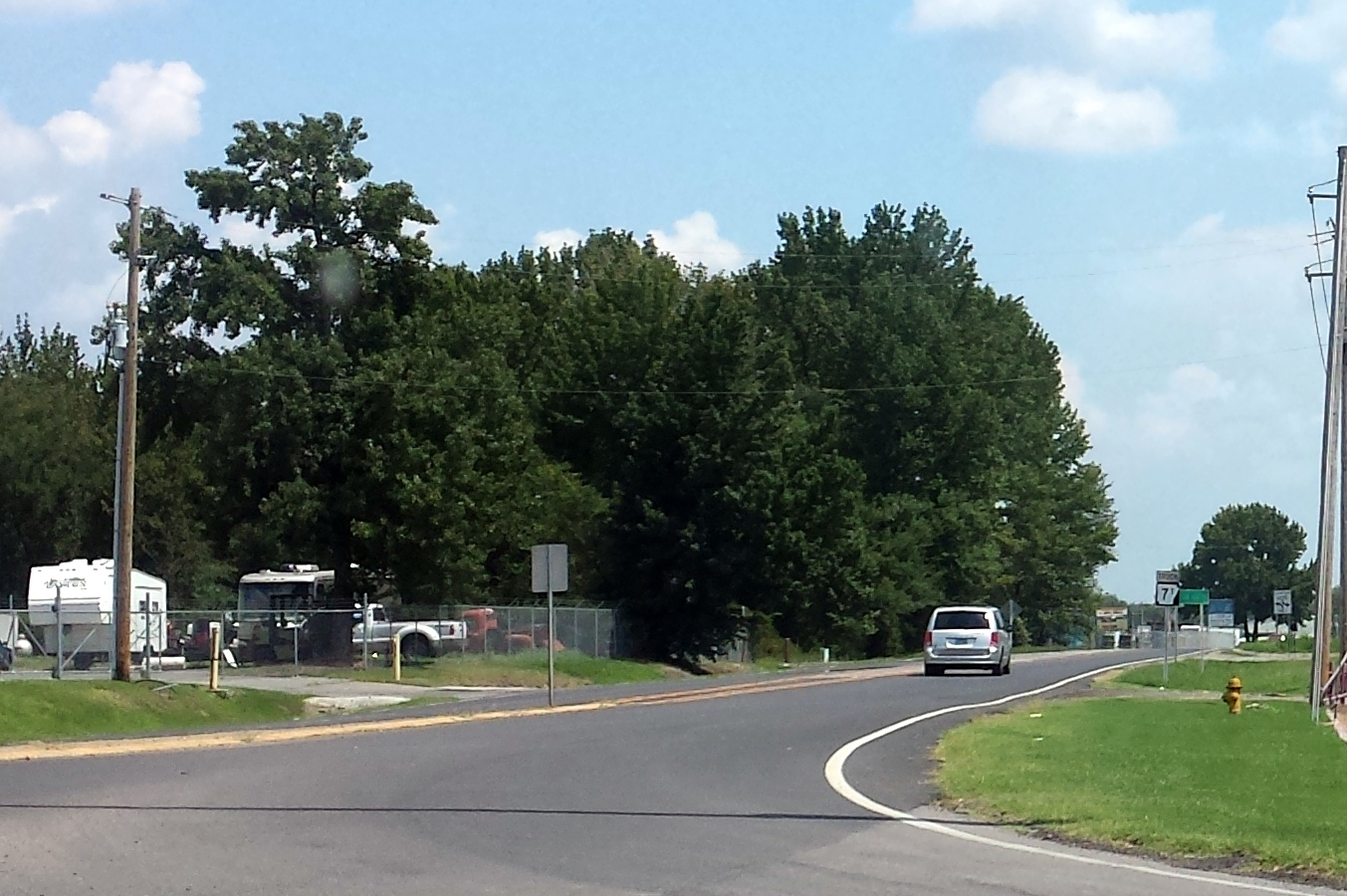
Highway 7T western terminus at Highway 7 in Russellville

Highway 7T
- Location: Russellville
- Length: 2.79 mi (4.49 km)
- Existed: March 7, 1962–present

Arkansas Highway 7 Truck is a truck route of 2.79 miles (4.49 km) in Russellville. The route runs from an intersection with Highway 7 and Highway 326 as a two-lane road. It runs east along Bernice Avenue before turning along Knoxville Avenue north to US 64.

Major intersections

The entire route is in Russellville, Pope County.

mi	km	Destinations	Notes
0.00	0.00	AR 7 (Arkansas Avenue) / AR 326 west (Boulder Avenue)	Southern terminus; counterclockwise terminus of AR 326
2.79	4.49	US 64 (Main Street)	Northern terminus
1.000 mi = 1.609 km; 1.000 km = 0.621 mi

== Marble Falls spur ==
Highway 7S
- Location: Marble Falls–Dogpatch
- Length: 0.29 mi (470 m)
- Existed: May 21, 1974–present

Arkansas Highway 7 Spur is a spur route of 0.29 miles (0.47 km) in Marble Falls. The route runs from the former amusement park Dogpatch USA whose parking lot contains Marble Falls' post office.

Major intersections

The entire route is in Newton County.

Location	mi	km	Destinations	Notes
Marble Falls	0.29	0.47	Ski Loop Drive	Southern terminus
Dogpatch	0.00	0.00	AR 7 – Russellville, Harrison	Northern terminus
1.000 mi = 1.609 km; 1.000 km = 0.621 mi

== Dallas County alternate route ==
State Road 7A
- Location: Dallas County
- Existed: c. 1931–c. July 1, 1937

State Road 7A is a former alternate route of 6.6 miles (10.6 km) in Dallas County. The route ran from State Road 9 in Holly Springs to State Road 7 in Pine Grove in South Arkansas. It was supplanted by State Road 128 in 1937.

Major intersections

The entire route was in Dallas County.

Location	mi	km	Destinations	Notes
Holly Springs	6.6	10.6	AR 9	Southern terminus
Sparkman	0.0	0.0	AR 7	Northern terminus
1.000 mi = 1.609 km; 1.000 km = 0.621 mi
