= Mountain View School =

Mountain View School can refer to:

- Mountain View High School (Mesa, Arizona)
- Mountain View High School (Pima County, Arizona)
- Mountain View High School (Mountain View, California)
- Mountain View High School (Bend, Oregon)
- Mountain View High School (Utah), in Orem
- Mountain View High School (Virginia), in Stafford County
- Mountain View High School (Washington), in Vancouver
- Mountain View High School (Wyoming), in Mountain View, Wyoming
- Mountain View High School (Idaho), in Meridian
- Mountain View School (Russellville, Arkansas), listed on the National Register of Historic Places in Pope County, Arkansas
- Mountain View State School, Gatesville, Texas

== See also ==
- Mountain View High School (disambiguation)
