= Wilson Matthews =

American football player and coach (1921–2002)

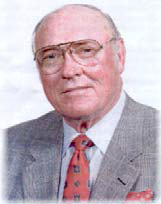

Biographical details
- Born: July 18, 1921; Atkins, Arkansas, U.S.
- Died: May 12, 2002 (aged 80); Fayetteville, Arkansas, U.S.

Playing career
- 1940–1941: Arkansas Tech
- 1942: Arkansas
- 1943: Monticello Marine-Navy
- Positions: Quarterback, fullback, linebacker

Coaching career (HC unless noted)
- 1944: Rogers HS (AR)
- 1945–1946: Little Rock HS (AR) (line)
- 1947–1957: Little Rock HS (AR)
- 1958–1968: Arkansas (DE/LB)

Head coaching record
- Overall: 118–17–3

Wilson David Matthews (July 18, 1921 – May 12, 2002) was an American football coach. He became a high school coaching legend in the state of Arkansas after winning 10 state championships and producing a 33-win streak in 11 years at Little Rock Central High School. He later became an assistant to Frank Broyles at the University of Arkansas.

Born and raised in rural Atkins, Arkansas, Matthews attended local Atkins High School, where he played varsity football under coach Raymond Burnett and was a two-time All-State selection. Matthews went on to play at Arkansas Tech University, where he was an All-Arkansas Intercollegiate Conference (AIC) honoree in 1940 and 1941. He continued his playing career at the University of Arkansas for one year under George Cole. In 1943, Matthews was drafted for military service and assigned to the Monticello A&M V-12 Program, where he played with the Monticello Marine-Navy team. He earned his bachelor's degree and his master's in education from Arkansas. Matthews also served his country in the U.S. Marine Corps during World War II.

In 1944 Matthews became head coach at Rogers High School in Rogers, Arkansas. After a single season, finished with a 7–3 record, Matthews left Rogers for the Little Rock High School, where he became an assistant to his former high school coach Raymond Burnett. As Burnett moved on to coach Arkansas Tech University, Matthews was named head coach, taking over one of the premier high school football programs in the nations. The Little Rock Central Tigers had won the mythical national championship in 1946.

Matthew's first Tiger teams went 12–0–1 in 1947 and 9–1–1 in 1948. His next two teams finished 10–1 and 10–2. In 1951, his team was 9–3 but a one-point loss to North Little Rock that season was the last defeat a Matthews-coached Central team had against competition from Arkansas. The Tigers were undefeated in the state the next six years. Matthews led the Tigers to unbeaten seasons in 1956 and 1957, and left the school with a 33-game winning streak. His 1957 team won the schools second mythical national championship.

Matthews joined the University of Arkansas Razorbacks in January 1958, coaching the defensive ends and linebackers at Arkansas before taking administrative duties in 1969. He continued to coach the freshmen until being named assistant athletic director in 1973. As a varsity coach, Matthews coached two All-Americans and eight All-Southwest Conference players. During his tenure the Hogs appeared in eight bowl games. Matthews served as an assistant and then associate athletic director until 1992 when he assumed the title of associate athletic director emeritus. Matthews was inducted to the Arkansas Sports Hall of Fame in 1971.

Matthews passed away at age 80 in Fayetteville, Arkansas

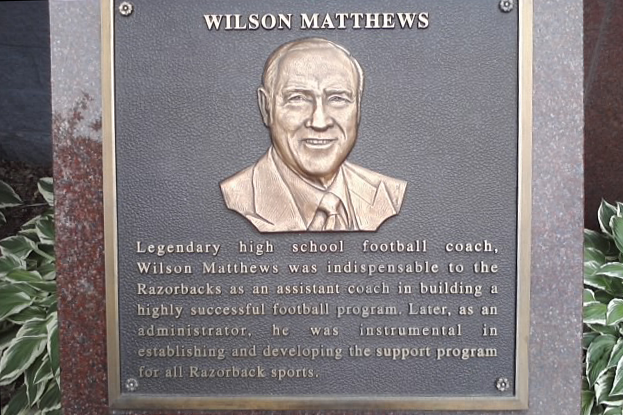
One of twelve plaques dedicated to supporters of the Razorback sports program. These are all located in a cluster under the gigantic scoreboard at the north end of Reynolds Stadium.

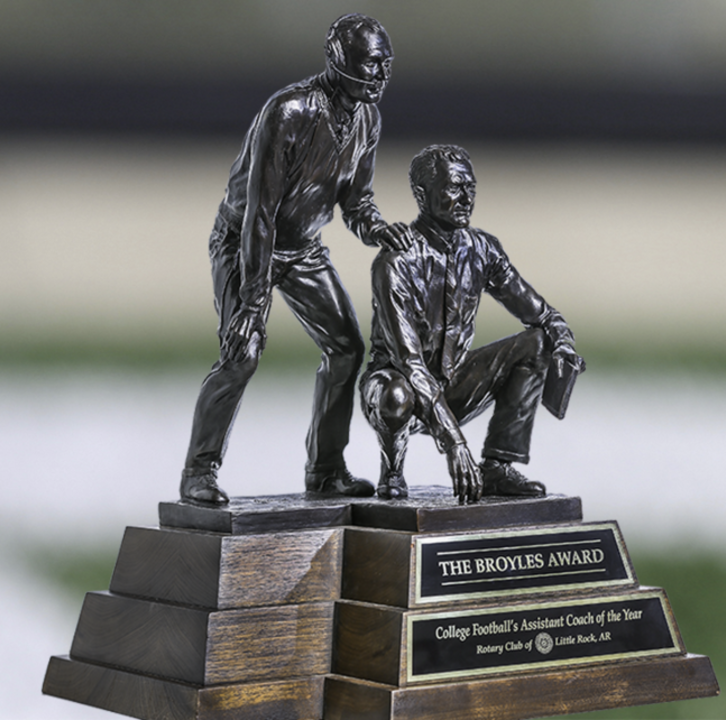
The Broyles Award trophy depicts Matthews standing next to Broyles. The award is given annually to honor the best assistant coach in college football.
