= Arkansas Highway 363 =

State highway in Arkansas, United States

Highway 363

Route information
- Maintained by ArDOT

Section 1
- Length: 1.08 mi (1.74 km)
- South end: I-40 / US 64 / AR 247 in Pottsville
- North end: Local road near Pottsville

Section 2
- Length: 2.10 mi (3.38 km)
- West end: Local road near Atkins
- East end: I-40 / AR 105 in Atkins

Location
- Country: United States
- State: Arkansas
- Counties: Pope

Highway system
- Arkansas Highway System; Interstate; US; State; Business; Spurs; Suffixed; Scenic; Heritage
← AR 362	→ AR 364

Arkansas Highway 363 (AR 363) is a designation for two state highways in Pope County, Arkansas. One segment of 1.08 miles (1.74 km) runs north from Interstate 40 (I-40) in Pottsville. A second segment of 2.10 miles (3.38 km) begins west of Atkins and runs east to I-40 in Atkins.

== Route description ==
=== Section 1 ===
Arkansas Highway 363 (AR 363) is a 1.1-mile-long (1.8 km) state highway in Pope County. The route begins at US 64 and Highway 247 in Pottsville before crossing I-40 and runs north, with state maintenance ending at Philips Road north of Pottsville.

=== Section 2 ===
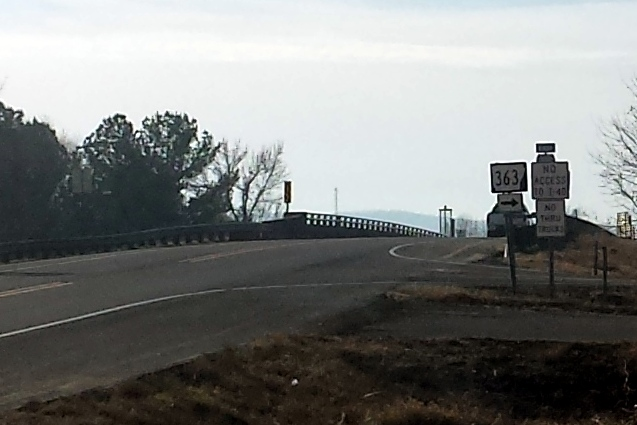
Highway 363 terminates at I-40 and Highway 105 in Atkins

Arkansas Highway 363 (AR 363) is a 2.1-mile-long (3.4 km) state highway in Pope County. The route begins west of Atkins as a continuation of a local road and runs east to Highway 105 at an interchange with I-40 (exit 94) in Atkins.

== Junction list ==
The entire route is in Pope County.

Location	mi	km	Destinations	Notes
Pottsville	0.00	0.00	US 64 / AR 247 south – Dardanelle, Atkins, Pottsville	Southern terminus; northern terminus of AR 247
Pottsville	0.08	0.13	I-40 – Little Rock, Fort Smith	Exit 88 on I-40
	1.08	1.74	End state maintenance	Northern terminus
Gap in route
	0.00	0.00	Begin state maintenance	Western terminus
Atkins	2.10	3.38	I-40 / AR 105	Eastern terminus; exit 94 on I-40
1.000 mi = 1.609 km; 1.000 km = 0.621 mi
