= Atkins High School =

Atkins High School may refer to:

== In the United States ==
- Atkins High School (Arkansas), Atkins, Arkansas
- Atkins High School (North Carolina), Winston-Salem, North Carolina
- Simon G. Atkins Academic & Technology High School, Winston-Salem, North Carolina
