= Confederate Mothers Memorial Park =

- U.S. National Register of Historic Places
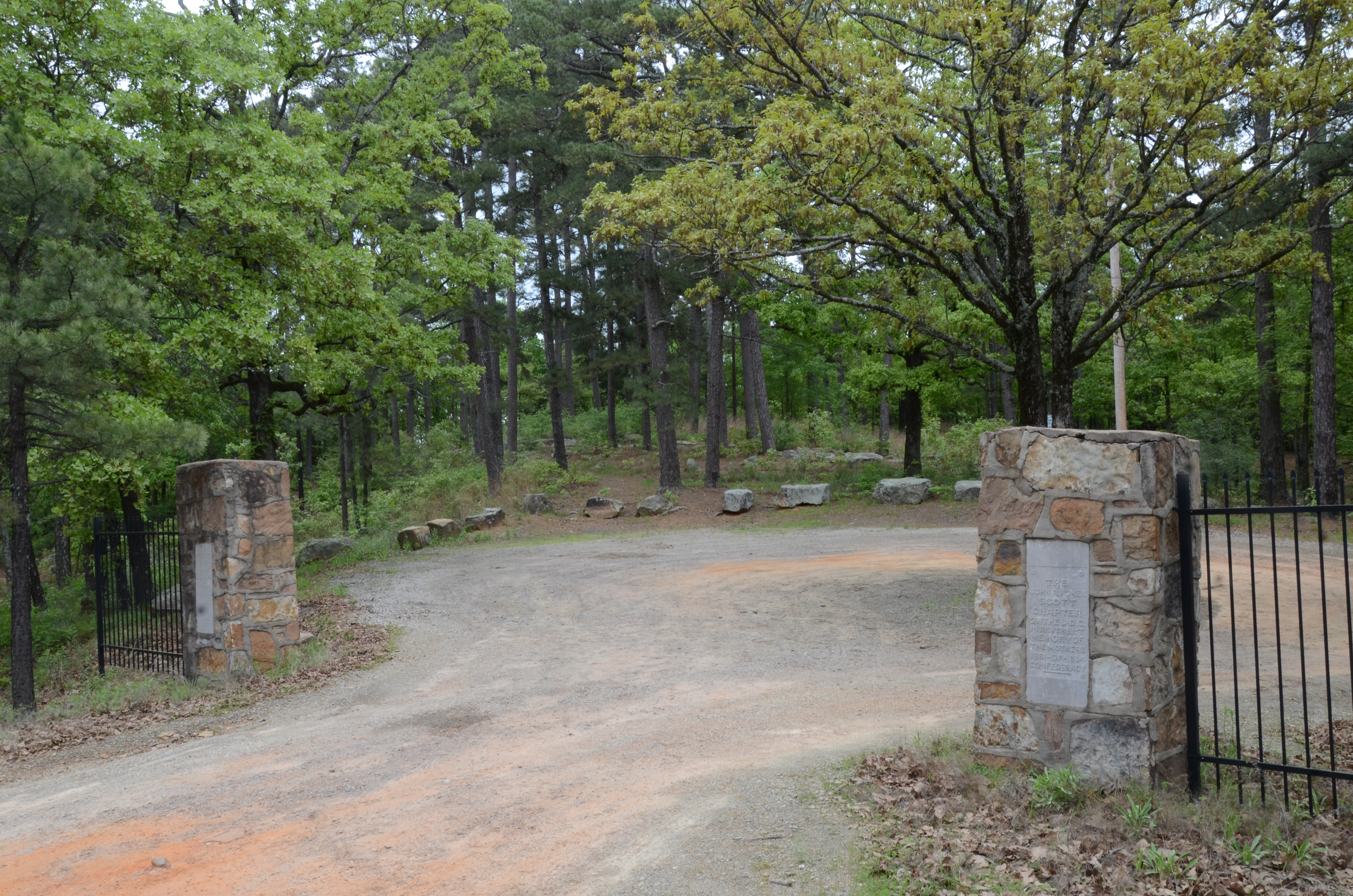
- Park entrance

- Location within Arkansas Location within the United States
- Location: Jct. of AR 326 and S. Glenwood Ave., Russellville, Arkansas
- Coordinates: 35°15′30″N 93°8′26″W
- Area: 20 acres (8.1 ha)
- Built: 1921
- Architectural style: Classical Revival, rustic
- MPS: Civil War Commemorative Sculpture MPS
- NRHP reference No.: 96000500
- Added to NRHP: May 3, 1996

The Confederate Mothers Memorial is a public park at Skyline Drive and West 19th Street in Russellville, Arkansas. The park covers about 20 acres (8.1 ha), most of which is unimproved woodlands. Near the junction of the two roads is a gravel parking lot, in which are three stone monuments, each one placed by a different Confederate veterans or memorial organization, with inscriptions honoring the mothers of the Confederacy.

== History ==
Land for the park was donated in 1921 to the United Daughters of the Confederacy, and the monuments were dedicated that year. Plans to further develop the park with other amenities have never been realized. It is believed to be the only Confederate memorial of its type in the state.

The park was listed on the National Register of Historic Places in 1996.

== Pine Knob Mountain Bike Park ==
In 2022 and 2022, a mountain bike park was built—under the authority of the City of Russellville Parks and Recreation Department—within Confederate Mothers Memorial Park to improve an unmaintained park and provide community access to mountain bike trails.

== See also ==
- List of Confederate monuments and memorials
- National Register of Historic Places listings in Pope County, Arkansas
