= Raymond Burnett =

American football player and coach (1914–1996)

Biographical details
- Born: January 29, 1914; New Hope, Arkansas, U.S.
- Died: July 19, 1996 (aged 82); North Little Rock, Arkansas, U.S.

Playing career
- 1933–1935: Arkansas Tech
- 1936: Arkansas State Teachers
- 1938: Chicago Cardinals
- Position: Halfback

Coaching career (HC unless noted)

Football
- 1939–1940: Atkins HS (AR)
- 1944–1947: Little Rock HS (AR)
- 1948–1953: Arkansas Tech
- 1954–1958: North Little Rock HS (AR)

Basketball
- 1941–1942: Arkansas Tech

Head coaching record
- Overall: 30–24–3 (college)

Raymond Burnett (January 29, 1914 – July 19, 1996) was an American professional football player and coach.

A native of New Hope, Arkansas, Burnett was a standout football player for four years in basketball and football at Atkins High School from 1928 to 1931. Nicknamed "Rabbit", he starred at halfback at Arkansas Tech University and the Arkansas State Teachers College (now University of Central Arkansas), before playing the 1938 NFL season for the Chicago Cardinals.

Burnett then started his coaching career at Atkins High School in 1939, where he coached for two seasons before having his career interrupted by World War II. In 1944 he returned to coaching, taking over head coaching duties at tradition-rich Little Rock Central High School. After an unbeaten 14–0 season in 1946 his team was named mythical national high school champion.

In 1948, Burnett left Little Rock High for his alma mater Arkansas Tech, where he served as head coach for six seasons. He compiled a 30–24–3 overall record, including leading Tech to back-to-back AIC titles in 1948 and 1949. However, after some less successful seasons Burnett left Arkansas Tech to coach at North Little Rock High School from 1954 to 1956. He was inducted to the Arkansas Sports Hall of Fame in 1974.
