= Moreland Township, Pope County, Arkansas =

Moreland Township
- Township
- Location in Arkansas
- Coordinates: 35°21′30″N 92°59′46″W
- Country: United States
- State: Arkansas
- County: Pope
- Established: 1844

Area
  - Total: 13.45 sq mi (34.8 km^{2})
  - Land: 13.39 sq mi (34.7 km^{2})
  - Water: 0.06 sq mi (0.16 km^{2})
- Elevation: 722 ft (220 m)

Population (2010)
  - Total: 699
  - Density: 52.2/sq mi (20.2/km^{2})
- Time zone: UTC-6 (CST)
  - Summer (DST): UTC-5 (CDT)
- GNIS feature ID: 69711

Moreland Township is a township in Pope County, Arkansas, United States. As of the 2010 census, the population was 699.

== Geography ==
According to the United States Census Bureau, Moreland Township covers an area of 13.45 miles (21.65 km), with 13.39 miles (21.55 km) of land and 0.06 miles (0.097 km) of water.

=== Settlements ===
- Moreland
- Oak Grove
