= Broyles Award =

College football award

- Awarded for: Award given to honor the best assistant coach in college football
- Location: Little Rock, Arkansas
- Country: United States
- Presented by: 1,500 assistant coaches representing all 130 Division I FBS programs

History
- First award: 1996
- Most recent: Bryant Haines, Indiana
- Website: broylesaward.com

The Broyles Award is an annual award given to honor the best assistant coach in college football. First awarded in 1996, it was named after former University of Arkansas men's athletic director Frank Broyles. The award is presented in Little Rock, Arkansas at the Downtown Rotary Club. To date 18 of the 23 winners have gone on to become head football coaches.

== Award ==
Every year, roughly 1,300 assistant coaches representing all 130 FBS programs are eligible for nomination by their peers as well as a Selection Committee composed of former head coaches. The nominees are narrowed down to just five finalists, all of whom are invited to Little Rock, Arkansas for the annual Broyles Award ceremony. The success of the five finalists is celebrated over a two-day period, which culminates in the award ceremony. Finalists receive gifts from event sponsors and a Broyles Award finalist plaque, while the winner receives the bronze-cast trophy, valued at $5,000.

== Trophy ==
The Broyles Award Trophy, made out of solid bronze, depicts Broyles (kneeling) and longtime University of Arkansas assistant coach Wilson Matthews (standing), watching over a Razorbacks football game or practice. Matthews was the coach of Little Rock Central High School before joining Broyles on the Razorbacks' staff.

== Selection committee members ==
The selection committee for the Frank Broyles Award includes many respected coaches from around the nation. The list of current committee members is as follows:

- Grant Teaff
- Barry Switzer
- Lou Holtz
- John Robinson
- Urban Meyer
- Jim Donnan
- Mike Bellotti
- R. C. Slocum
- Frank Beamer
- Gary Pinkel
- Steve Spurrier
- Bob Stoops
- Bill Snyder
- Mark Richt
- Phillip Fulmer

== Broadcast Selection Committee Members ==
The list of current Broadcast Selection Committee Members is as follows:

- Maria Taylor (sportscaster)
- Desmond Howard
- Jake Crain

== Winners ==
Note: The award year indicates the season it was earned.

Year	Coach	Position	School
1996	Mickey Andrews	Defensive coordinator	Florida State
1997	Jim Herrmann	Defensive coordinator	Michigan
1998	David Cutcliffe	Assistant head coach/Offensive coordinator/Quarterbacks Coach	Tennessee
1999	Ralph Friedgen	Offensive coordinator/Quarterback coach	Georgia Tech
2000	Mark Mangino	Offensive coordinator	Oklahoma
2001	Randy Shannon	Defensive coordinator	Miami (FL)
2002	Norm Chow	Offensive coordinator	USC
2003	Brian VanGorder	Defensive coordinator/Linebackers Coach	Georgia
2004	Gene Chizik	Defensive coordinator/Defensive Backs coach	Auburn
2005	Greg Davis	Offensive coordinator/Quarterback coach	Texas
2006	Bud Foster	Defensive coordinator/Inside Linebackers Coach	Virginia Tech
2007	Jim Heacock	Defensive coordinator	Ohio State
2008	Kevin Wilson	Offensive coordinator/Tight ends coach/Fullbacks coach	Oklahoma
2009	Kirby Smart	Defensive coordinator	Alabama
2010	Gus Malzahn	Assistant head coach/Offensive coordinator/Quarterbacks Coach	Auburn
2011	John Chavis	Defensive coordinator/Linebackers Coach	LSU
2012	Bob Diaco	Assistant head coach/Defensive coordinator/Linebackers Coach	Notre Dame
2013	Pat Narduzzi	Defensive coordinator	Michigan State
2014	Tom Herman	Offensive coordinator/Quarterback coach	Ohio State
2015	Lincoln Riley	Offensive coordinator	Oklahoma
2016	Brent Venables	Defensive coordinator	Clemson
2017	Tony Elliott	Offensive coordinator	Clemson
2018	Mike Locksley	Offensive coordinator	Alabama
2019	Joe Brady	Passing game coordinator/Wide receivers coach	LSU
2020	Steve Sarkisian	Offensive coordinator	Alabama
2021	Josh Gattis	Offensive coordinator	Michigan
2022	Garrett Riley	Offensive coordinator	TCU
2023	Phil Parker	Defensive coordinator	Iowa
2024	Al Golden	Defensive coordinator	Notre Dame
2025	Bryant Haines	Defensive coordinator	Indiana
