= Atkins School District =

School district in Arkansas

Location
- 307 North Church Street; Atkins, Arkansas 72823 United States

District information
- Grades: PK–12
- Superintendent: Chris Taylor
- Accreditation: Arkansas Department of Education
- Schools: 4
- NCES District ID: 0502610

Students and staff
- Students: 951
- Teachers: 130.98 (on FTE basis)
- Staff: 206.49
- Student–teacher ratio: 7.26
- District mascot: Red Devil
- Colors: Scarlet White

Other information
- Website: www.atkinsschools.org

Atkins School District is a public school district based in Atkins, Arkansas, United States. The Atkins School District provides early childhood, elementary and secondary education for around 1,000 prekindergarten through grade 12 students at its three facilities in Pope County, which receive Title I funding.

It includes the communities of Atkins and Oak Grove.

The Atkins School District is accredited by the Arkansas Department of Education (ADE).

== History ==
Jody Jenkins served as superintendent until 2020, when he died of COVID-19.

In 2021 the district decided to adopt a four day school week instead of a five day school week.

== Schools ==
In fall 2010, the district opened a 130,000 square feet (12,000 m^{2}) modern facility that houses the elementary and middle schools.

- Atkins High School—grades 9 through 12.
- Atkins Middle School—grades 5 through 8.
- Atkins Elementary School—prekindergarten through grade 4.
- ABC Preschool—prekindergarten.
