= Mystic Caverns and Crystal Dome =

Former show caves in Arkansas

- Location within Arkansas Location within the United States
- Location: Marble Falls, Arkansas
- Coordinates: 36°07′11″N 93°07′36″W
- Depth: 110 feet (34 m)
- Discovery: c. 1850
- Geology: Limestone
- Entrances: 2
- Access: closed
- Show cave opened: c. 1928

Mystic Caverns and Crystal Dome are former show caves located between the cities of Jasper and Harrison, in the state of Arkansas, U.S., on the Arkansas Highway 7 Scenic Byway near the defunct amusement park Dogpatch USA. Sometimes called "the twin caves" because they are within 400 feet (120 m) of each other, the two caves maintain a year-round temperature of 58 °F, contain more formations per foot than any other caves in Arkansas, and are open for public tours year-round except during the January flooding season.

A third cave on the site, Not Much Sink cavern, has been deemed too dangerous to allow public tours.

Mystic Caverns, which has operated commercially since the late 1920s, is older than any other commercially operated cave in Arkansas, with the exception of Onyx Cave in Eureka Springs, and perhaps nearby Diamond Cave in Jasper, which has been toured since 1925. Crystal Dome was discovered in the mid-1960s during landscaping operations at Dogpatch USA. Great care was taken to preserve this pristine cave, and as a result 90% of it is still being formed. Tours began in the Crystal Dome in 1981.

Since 2021, the two caves have been closed indefinitely.

== History ==
The area was settled in the 1830s and named "Wilcockson". At that time the entrance to the as-yet-unnamed Mystic Caverns was a sinkhole which led to a 10-foot (3.0 m) drop into the cave itself. It is likely that settlers became aware of the cave and visited it prior to the 1850s. However, the first known visitor to the cave carved his name and the date on one of the formations:

Adam Kolbe
Wilcockson
April 16, 1919

The cave was first given the name "Mansion Cave", date unknown, for its huge open chambers, and around 1928 the first commercial tours were offered to the public. Owned by Jim and Bob Gurley, who constructed a wooden ladder down into the sinkhole and leveled the floor for trails, the tours were guided by the use of kerosene lanterns for illumination. They renamed the cave "Wild Horse Cavern" and stationed a hand carved horse next to the ticket booth.

In 1930 the cave was purchased by a man named Singer who continued to operate it commercially, and issued each visitor a pair of coveralls and a kerosene lantern. Most of the soot damage to the cave was caused during this period. From 1937 to 1938 the cave was owned by Jerry Cannon and managed by Mose Arnold, who replaced the ladder with concrete steps and hung a rope next to the steps to aid visitors as they descended into the cave.

In 1938 commercial visitation to the cave was halted by an unidentified Arkansas state official; the dangerous condition of the steps and the probability of rock slides near the entrance to the cave were the likely reasons. From 1938 until 1949 the cave was unsupervised and frequently visited by the local residents. During this period the cave was damaged to a great extent by vandals who carried away pieces of the formations and sold them to commercial rock dealers.

In 1949 the cave was bought by Albert Raney Sr., who owned a nearby trout farm. The local highway was being paved for the first time, and Raney, who saw great potential for the cave as a tourist attraction, removed all the accumulated debris that had gathered over the years, created a safer spiral path down the sinkhole entrance to the cave and added steps where the path became too steep. He also added hand rails, leveled the trails and covered them with lime which hardened to provide better footing, installed the first electric lighting system inside the cave, and built a new ticket booth (which was eventually destroyed in a fire in 1984). The cave was renamed "Mystic Caverns" and reopened for public tours in 1950. In 1959 Albert Raney Sr. handed the responsibility of the enterprise to his son Albert Raney Jr. He would continue to manage the cave's operations with the help of his family and friends until 1984.

In 1966, the cave was purchased, along with the Raney's trout pond, by the developers of Dogpatch USA, a theme park based on Al Capp's Li'l Abner comic strip, and was intended to be incorporated into the park's attractions. Development of the area began around and within the cave. Jim Schermerhorn, an experienced caver, and original shareholder of Dogpatch, supervised the work.

Originally, the cave had some potentially dangerous problems. The first visitors had to hike up and down Mill Creek canyon to reach the entrance. Later, a rickety swinging bridge had been constructed over the canyon eliminating the exhausting hike, but creating a new danger. Also, the sinkhole entrance was still quite dangerous. Schermerhorn would have a safer road across the canyon built and a new man-made entrance to the cave constructed. Other improvements included a new parking lot, landscaping around the cave, and a new ticket office and gift shop. The trails within the cave were slightly altered and replaced with stone. Also, pipe welded hand rails, and a new indirect lighting system was added.

During construction of the new parking lot, while Jim Schermerhorn was operating a bulldozer, a new sinkhole opened up leading to an enormous previously unknown cavern. The cave was named "Old Man Moses Cave" after a Li'l Abner cartoon character. Being an experienced caver, Schermerhorn realized the importance of preserving the pristine cave never before seen or touched by human hands. He camped out at the entrance of the cave until it could be blocked off from visitors.

In 1968, Mystic Caverns reopened under the name "Dogpatch Caverns". "Old Man Moses Cave" was supposed to open eventually as well as a part of Dogpatch, but like many planned projects of the park, it would never happen. In 1981, Dogpatch sold the caves and they continued to be managed by Bruce Raney, son of Albert Raney Jr. During this time, the Old Man Moses Cave project was completed. It has since been renamed Crystal Dome and opened to the public. Omni Projects bought the two caves in 1984 and hired Burt Allen to manage the property. In 1988, Steve Rush purchased the property and it was managed by Jennifer Updegraff, Steven Rush and Marcia Johnson. Mystic Caverns, Inc bought the property in 1997 and owns it currently.

== Present day ==
Today Mystic Caverns and Crystal Dome are managed by Steve Rush, and guided tours, which include both caves, are conducted every 35 to 45 minutes and last about an hour and twenty minutes.

In late 2008, Rush put the caverns up for auction on eBay. The minimum bid was first set at $1.2 million, but later reduced to $899,900. Rush said he is selling the attraction because he has "tired of trying to entertain people" in his role as tour guide. Once a buyer is found for the caverns, Rush plans to become involved in Christian ministries.

Mystic Caverns averages about 15,000 visitors each year, Rush told an Associated Press reporter.

As of August 2022, Mystic Caverns is closed until further notice.
