= Atkins High School (Arkansas) =

Location
- 400 Ave Three NW; Atkins, Arkansas 72823-4199; United States; 35°14′40″N 92°56′20.8″W

Information
- School type: Public comprehensive
- Status: Open
- School district: Atkins School District
- CEEB code: 040075
- NCES School ID: 050261000033
- Teaching staff: 76.19 (on FTE basis)
- Grades: 9–12
- Enrollment: 317 (2023-2024)
- Student to teacher ratio: 4.16
- Education system: ADE Smart Core
- Classes offered: Regular, Advanced Placement (AP)
- Campus: 60 acres (24 ha)
- Colors: Scarlet and white
- Athletics conference: 3A Region 4
- Mascot: Red Devil
- Team name: Atkins Red Devils
- Accreditation: ADE
- Website: ahs.atkinsschools.org

Atkins High School is a comprehensive public high school located in the rural, distant community of Atkins, Arkansas, United States. The school provides secondary education for students in grades 9 through 12. It is one of nine public high schools in Pope County, Arkansas and the sole high school administered by the Atkins School District on the district's 60 acres (24 ha) campus.

The Atkins district, and therefore the attendance boundary of the high school, includes the communities of Atkins and Oak Grove.

== Academics ==
Atkins High School is accredited by the Arkansas Department of Education (ADE) and the assumed course of study follows the Smart Core curriculum developed by the ADE, which requires students complete at least 22 units prior to graduation. Students complete regular coursework and exams and may take Advanced Placement (AP) courses and exam with the opportunity to receive college credit.

== Athletics ==
The Atkins High School mascot and athletic emblem is the Red Devil with scarlet and white serving as the school colors.

The Atkins Red Devils compete in interscholastic activities within the 3A Classification via the 3A Region 4 Conference, as administered by the Arkansas Activities Association. The Red Devils field teams in golf (boys/girls), basketball (boys/girls), track and field (boys/girls), baseball, and competitive cheer. Led by All-State QB Charlie Sorrels and All-State receiver Robert Norman, Atkins won the 1971 state Class A football championship, posting an 11-2-0 record under legendary coach Carl Sorrels. Between 1947 and 1958, Atkins won six Class B state track and field championships. One of Atkins' greatest all-time student-athletes is the late Sammy May who went on to be a three-time All-AIC running back at Arkansas Tech (1952–54). May also excelled in baseball and track and field while a student-athlete at Atkins. A member of the Arkansas Sports Hall of Fame, Raymond "Rabbit" Burnett (1914–1996) was an Atkins High graduate who went on to coach Little Rock High School to a mythical national championship in 1946 (14-0) and then coached Arkansas Tech to back-to-back AIC football championships in 1948–1949. Wilson Matthews (1921–2002), another Atkins High graduate, also coached at Little Rock High School (1947–57) where he won a mythical national high school football championship in 1957. Matthews later coached at the University of Arkansas (1958–68).

== Notable people ==
- Raymond Burnett (1931; Coach, 1939–40)—American football player and coach; inductee, Arkansas Sports Hall of Fame.
- Wilson Matthews (1939)—American football coach.
- Scott Richardson, member of the Arkansas House of Representatives
