= Mountain View School (Russellville, Arkansas) =

- U.S. National Register of Historic Places
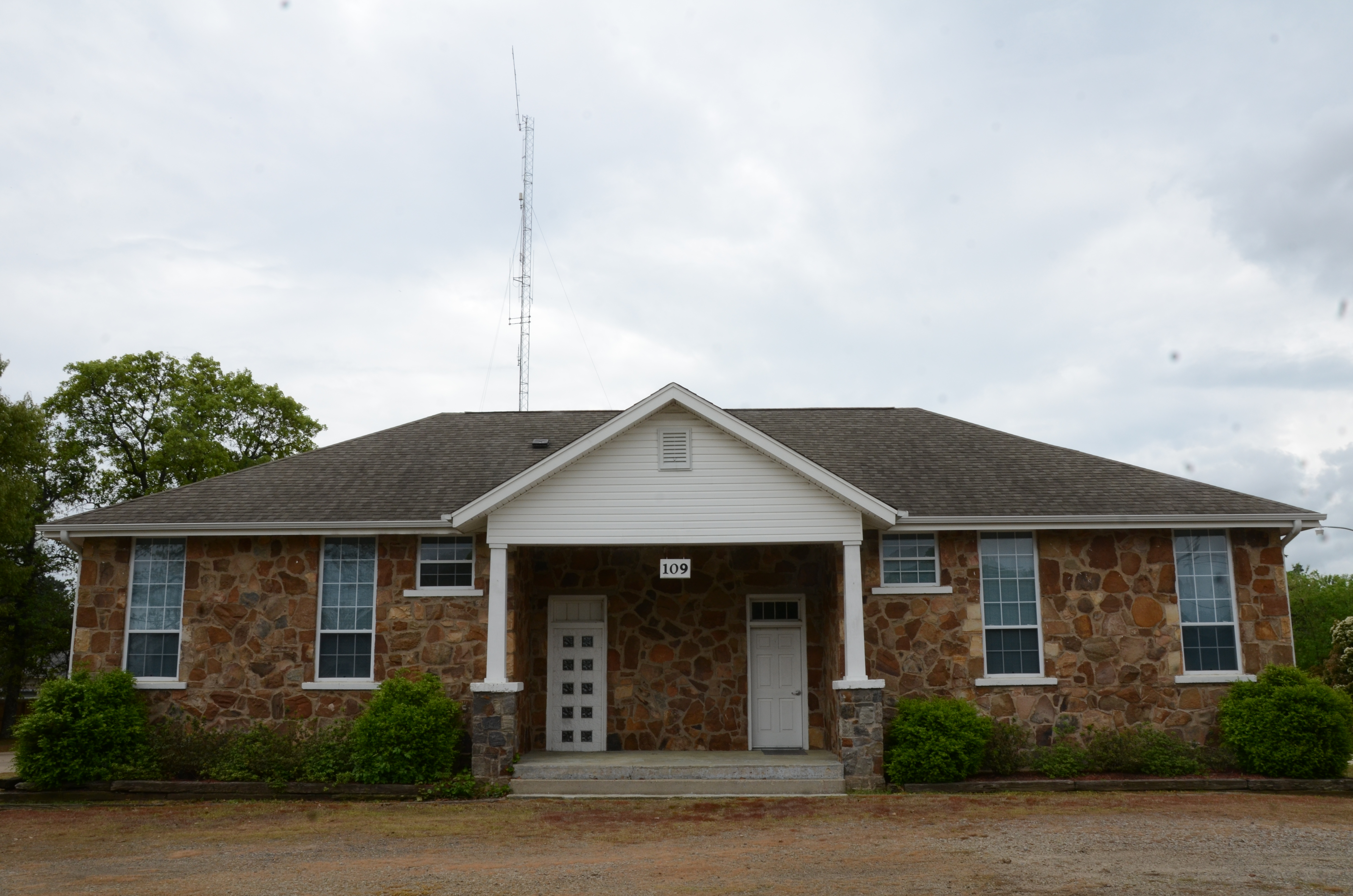

- Location within Arkansas Location within the United States
- Location: AR 326, Russellville, Arkansas
- Coordinates: 35°16′32″N 93°10′13″W
- Area: less than one acre
- Architectural style: Bungalow/craftsman
- MPS: Public Schools in the Ozarks MPS
- NRHP reference No.: 92001207
- Added to NRHP: September 10, 1992

The former Mountain View School, now the Russellville Fire Station No. 2, is a historic school building at 109 Hilltop Drive (Arkansas Highway 326) in Russellville, Arkansas. It is a single story masonry structure, built out of fieldstone and covered by a hip roof. Its entrance are sheltered under a project gable-roofed porch with square columns set on stone piers. The school was built in 1926, during a period of significant growth in the city's history.

The building was listed on the National Register of Historic Places in 1992.

== See also ==
- National Register of Historic Places listings in Pope County, Arkansas
