= Marble Falls, Arkansas =

Unincorporated community in Arkansas, United States

Coordinates: 36°06′24″N 93°07′56″W

Marble Falls (known as Marble City from 1840 to 1883, Willcockson from 1883 to 1934, and Dogpatch from 1966 to 1997) is an unincorporated community in Newton County, Arkansas, United States. It lies along Arkansas's National Scenic 7 Byway between Harrison and Jasper. The Marble Falls Post Office is located in the parking lot of the now-defunct theme park called Dogpatch USA. For a time, the town was known as Dogpatch to promote the theme park.

Marble Falls is part of the Harrison Micropolitan Statistical Area.

== History ==
=== Settlement ===
A Choctaw Indian named Ah-Che-To-Mah was the first settler known to have acquired title to land in the vicinity of Marble Falls. The waterfall once supplied power for a flour mill, cotton gin, and sawmill. Peter Beller built the original water-powered grist mill there, and this mill was later rebuilt and remodeled by several different owners.

=== Marble City, Arkansas (1840 to 1883) ===
The community was originally named Marble City, after the marble that was quarried nearby. Marble City became known as a health resort in the 1880s, through the advertisements of businessmen such as Dr. Silas Scruggs Stacey, proprietor of the Stacey family store and provider of Dr. S. S. Staceys Sulphur Mountain Bitters (which sold briskly for $1 per bottle).

In 1836, William Harp and his brothers, Elijah and Samuel, with Peter Bellah quarried a large block of marble at Marble City by drilling and wedging. They put the marble on a log wagon and, with ten yokes of oxen to pull it, moved it 60 miles across the Boston Mountains to the Arkansas River near Clarksville, where it was shipped to Washington, D.C. The block of marble (with" Arkansas" chiseled on it), along with other memorial stones, is located on the 30-foot level of the Washington Monument.

=== Willcockson, Arkansas (1883–1934) ===
The first post office was established on September 24, 1883, and the first postmaster, Mander Willcockson, officially renamed the community Willcockson. On October 29, 1917, Ida T. Chesbro was appointed the U.S. Postmaster of Willcockson. Absalom C. Phillips, a local preacher, added the cotton gin in 1890. After 1900, the town began to fade away, and the mills and gin were destroyed sometime in the early 1900s. By 1915, many began to leave the area due to economic depression.

=== Marble Falls, Arkansas (1934–1966 and 1997 to present) ===
Albert Raney, Sr., who became postmaster in 1934, had the official name changed to Marble Falls.

=== Dogpatch, Arkansas (1966–1997) ===
When the Raney property was purchased in 1966 by the developers of Dogpatch USA, Governor Orval Faubus and some developers had the area's postal designation changed to Dogpatch, and it would appear that way on highway maps. The theme park closed in 1993, and in 1997 the citizens of the area voted unanimously to change the postal designation back to Marble Falls, the name it has today.

=== Skiing (1972–1980s) ===
The only lift-serviced skiing ever in Arkansas was offered at the Marble Falls Resort beginning circa 1972 and lasting until the 1980s.

== See also ==
- Mystic Caverns and Crystal Dome
