= Dogpatch USA =

Former theme park in northwest Arkansas

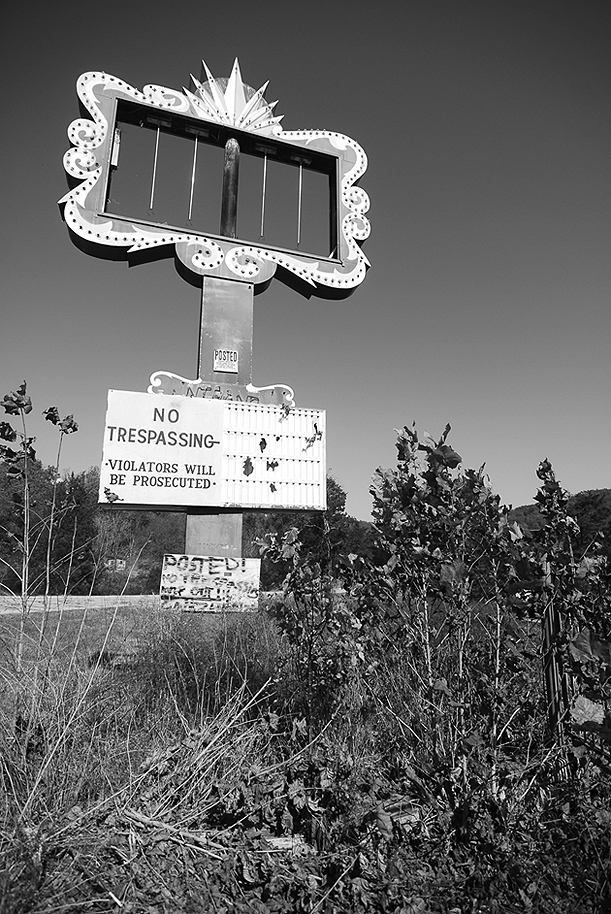
- Old entrance sign (2008)
- Interactive map of Dogpatch USA
- Location: Marble Falls, Arkansas, U.S.
- Coordinates: 36°06′24″N 93°07′56″W
- Opened: 1968
- Closed: 1993
- Owner: Down By The Falls, LLC (Johnny Morris)
- Theme: Li'l Abner
- Slogan: "Have A Heckuva Day at Dogpatch USA!"
- Area: 124-acre (0.50 km^{2})
- Replaced: 2014, 2018 as Heritage USA Ozarks Resort at Historic Dogpatch

Dogpatch USA was a theme park located in northwest Arkansas along State Highway 7 between the cities of Harrison and Jasper, an area known today as Marble Falls. It was based on the comic strip Li'l Abner, created by cartoonist Al Capp and set in a fictional village called Dogpatch. The park opened in 1968, and closed in 1993.

Dogpatch USA was a commercial success in its early years. Investors tried to parlay that success into a sister park, "Marble Falls," planned with a ski resort and convention center. The venture failed and led to the park's closure in 1993. The property then fell into disrepair. Parts of the park have been divided up and sold, and the main area has been bought, sold, and foreclosed on several times.

A documentary about Dogpatch USA by Jeff Carter Productions was released in May 2018.

== History ==
=== Origins ===
In 1966, Albert Raney, Sr. decided to sell his family's Ozark trout farm and listed it with O. J. Snow, a Harrison, Arkansas, real estate agent. Snow examined the property and decided that the Raney farm was ideal for an amusement park based on pioneer themes, which was an idea he had entertained for years. He noted that features of the area resembled those pictured in the Li'l Abner comic strip: he imagined Mill Creek Canyon at the base of a 55-foot (16.8 m) waterfall could be the "bottomless canyon" featured in the comic strip, and the nearby tourist attraction Mystic Caverns (also owned by the Raney family) could become "Dogpatch Cave", where Kickapoo Joy Juice was brewed by a few unsavory Dogpatch characters.

Snow and nine or ten Harrison businessmen formed Recreation Enterprises, Incorporated (REI) to develop the land. Their first step was to get permission from Al Capp, the creator of Li'l Abner, for a park based on his work. According to an Arkansas Gazette article, Snow sent Capp home movies of the property and descriptions of the attractions. In addition to the trout farm and Mystic Caverns cave, Snow planned a variety of attractions and activities, including horseback riding, paddle boats, train rides, local arts and crafts shops, family-oriented theatrical presentations, a botanical garden, an apiary, and honey and fudge shops. Li'l Abner comic-strip characters would roam the park and perform skits for the patrons. Snow also assured Capp that the park would be quiet and dignified and would not include roller coasters or thrill rides that would conflict with the rustic Li'l Abner theme. Capp, who had turned down other offers to use his characters in theme parks, accepted this one and became a partner, claiming he had once driven through the Ozarks and had pictured just such an area for the setting of his fictional "Dogpatch" town. On January 4, 1967, an article in the Northwest Arkansas Times stated that Capp's attorneys were finalizing the agreement. Capp approved of the plans for the park and granted REI the rights to use his characters.

Some state officials and Arkansas residents objected to the creation of the theme park because they thought that it would encourage negative hillbilly stereotypes. Lou Oberste of the Publicity and Parks Commission expressed reservations, and Commission Director Bob Evans agreed that Arkansas had difficulty shedding a similar image created by comedic actor Bob Burns.

In January 1967, Edwin T. Haefele of the Brookings Institution and Leon N. Moses, Professor of Economics at Northwestern University, were in Arkansas attending the Central Arkansas Urban Policy Conference. When reporters asked for their opinions of the Dogpatch project, they expressed doubts about the likelihood of its success, citing the failure of other theme parks that had popped up trying to replicate Disneyland's great success. They also felt that such theme parks tend to cause nearby property values to deflate and local businesses to relocate to more desirable areas. Despite these reservations, the Publicity and Parks Commission toured the property and decided to support the project, and the Harrison Chamber of Commerce approved the plans for the 825 acre (3.3 km^{2}) park. In comparison, Disneyland originally called for only eight acres.

=== Building and opening the park ===
Al Capp and his wife attended the ground-breaking ceremony on Tuesday, October 3, 1967. Phase I of the project, at a cost of $1.332 million, included construction of the initial buildings and rides. A second phase, which included the construction of a train from Dogpatch to Marble Falls, a tram from the parking lot to the park entrance, the "Skunk Hollow" section of the park, a motel, and a golf course, was planned to be completed over the next two years at a cost of $2 million. In 1968, the name of the community post office was officially changed from Marble Falls to Dogpatch.

Under the direction of Jim Schermerhorn, an REI board member and experienced caver, Mystic Caverns, which was renamed "Dogpatch Caverns", was completely renovated. Dangerous conditions were corrected to ensure safety, and the additions included a better lighting system, walkway, and entrance. During renovation, while Schermerhorn was operating the bulldozer, a second cave was discovered next to Mystic Caverns. Realizing the potential value of this pristine cave, he had it blocked off so that it could be preserved untouched. It was named "Old Man Moses Cave" and put on the "to do" list along with the other projects intended for Phase II. Schermerhorn also acquired several authentic 19th century log cabins in the Ozark Mountains and had them dismantled, shipped, and reconstructed in the park. A watermill that had originally operated on the property circa 1834 was restored and made fully operational.

Dogpatch USA opened and welcomed about 8,000 visitors on May 17, 1968. The centerpiece of the park was a giant statue of the fictional town hero, Jubilation T. Cornpone. Capp unveiled the statue during his dedication speech to a crowd of about 2,000. Kim Capp, son of Al Capp, worked as the assistant Public Relations Director. General admission was $1.50 for adults and $0.75 for children. During the first year, the park's attractions included a railroad, surrey rides, trail rides, a stable, an apiary, a grist mill tour, a slide, a petting zoo, and a "mule swing". Fishing in the trout pond was another activity offered; the Dogpatch restaurant could then cook the trout for visitors. Artisans demonstrated their work, including candlemaking, glassblowing, and woodcarving, and local crafts were available for purchase, including handmade dulcimers, smoking chips, and embroidered aprons, though crafts produced elsewhere supplemented the local products. The "alpine-style" Dogpatch Inn provided accommodations for visitors. The park reported a net profit of about $100,000 at the end of the 1968 season.

Attendance expectations for the park were, in retrospect, extremely optimistic. David Wesley and Harrison Price of the Los Angeles consulting firm Economic Research Associates projected 400,000 patrons in the first year. They projected that within 10 years, annual attendance would exceed 1 million and annual revenue would be $5 million. However, Dogpatch USA hosted only 300,000 visitors in 1968. Estimates of attendance in its subsequent years have varied widely. According to a February 9, 1997, article in the Arkansas Democrat-Gazette, it never reported more than 200,000 visitors in any subsequent year. However, according to an August 10, 1997, article in the same newspaper, "in the early 1970s, the park was attracting almost a million visitors each year."

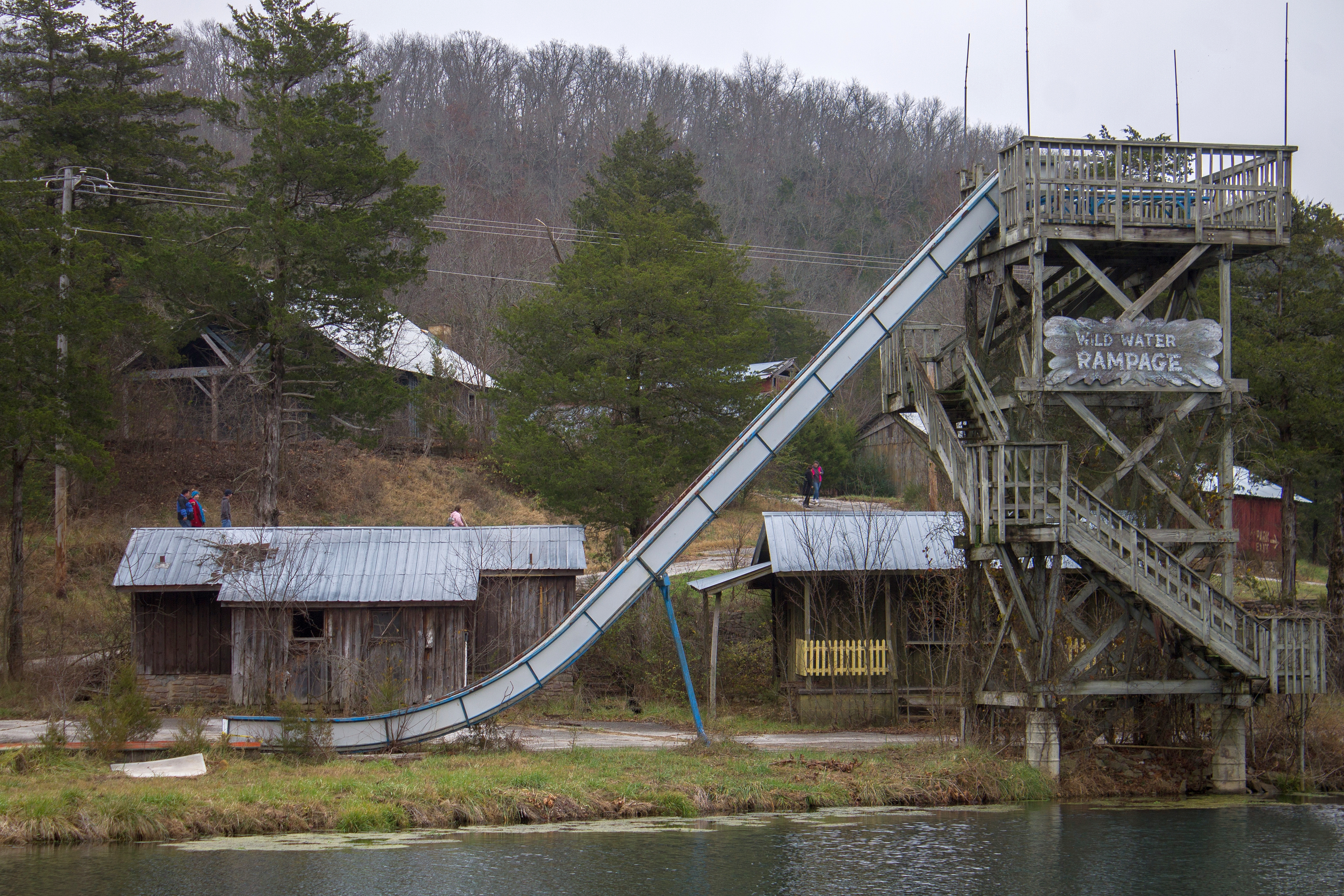
Abandoned waterslide at Dogpatch USA, in December 2014

=== Jess Odom ownership ===
A disagreement arose among the members of REI with regards to investing the profits of the first year. Snow believed all the profits should be reinvested in the park, but the other members wanted to divide some of it among themselves. Jess Odom, an Arkansas businessman in search of an opportunity, bought REI members' shares for $750,000 and gained a controlling interest in the park in October 1968. Odom had been successful in several other endeavors, including the founding of a planned community northwest of Little Rock called Maumelle. In summer 1968, there were plans to expand the park further in time for next season's opening; the planned attractions were the "Skunk Holler" section, new shops, and more Li'l Abner-themed performances.

Odom signed a long-term licensing agreement with Capp, giving the park and any future Li'l Abner franchises the rights to use all characters, events, jargon, names, and titles until 1998. In return, Capp would receive two to three percent of the gross of admissions over the same time period.

According to some sources, in 1969, the cave discovered during construction, "Old Man Moses Cave," was opened to park visitors. However, according to Mystic Caverns' owners, the Old Man Moses Cave was never opened to the public while it was part of Dogpatch USA. Also in 1969, the first annual Miss Dogpatch pageant was held in the park. During that time, Orval Faubus, former governor of Arkansas, served as the president of Dogpatch USA. Also in 1969 the B-movie It's Alive! was partly filmed at the Dogpatch Theme park.

1969 marked a particularly popular year for rustic and hillbilly pop culture. Shows such as Green Acres, Petticoat Junction, and The Beverly Hillbillies were in vogue on American television, and a similar rustic-themed park about 40 miles away near Branson, Missouri, Silver Dollar City, had become a huge success. The Li'l Abner comic strip was appearing in more than 700 newspapers daily throughout the country, which kept the fictional town of Dogpatch in the public eye. In 1968, Al Capp had granted New York restaurant chain Longchamps, Inc. the rights to use his characters and artwork in a planned Li'l Abner-themed restaurant franchise. Capp had also approved the creation of a Li'l Abner TV series, and the Dogpatch USA operators hoped the park and series would mutually build each other's audiences.

Dogpatch USA was profitable in its first few years, and Odom expanded the park's amenities. By the 1970 opening day, a motel consisting of 60 mobile-home units had been completed, and a funicular to carry guests from the parking lot to the park entrance was a few weeks away from completion. In 1971, Odom, who foresaw unlimited potential for the park, bought out most of the remaining investors for $700,000 and became, essentially, the owner. Several new attractions were added in time for the 1972 season opening, including an "Animal World" section with a sea lion exhibit and an aviary with exotic birds, a children's water ride, and, as stated by the Harrison Daily Times, a "unique boat train ride."

In August 1972, Odom announced that he was financing the construction of a sister park, Marble Falls Resort and Convention Center, which was the first ski resort in Arkansas. The two parks were marketed together as a year-round attraction. The resort was ready for the Christmas season of 1972, though a winter storm prevented it from opening until after Christmas. The resort used snow machines to produce enough snow for skiing; the anticipated skiing season was December to mid-March. Marble Falls Resort and Convention Center included ski slopes, a toboggan run, an ice-skating rink, the 62-unit Marble Falls Inn, 36 condominiums, and 30 rental alpine chalets, though the condos and chalets weren't completed until after the initial opening. Odom also opened the Antique Auto Museum as part of the Marble Falls complex.

Odom also continued to expand Dogpatch USA. New attractions during the 1973 season included a go-cart track named Pappy Yokum's Positively Petrifying Putt-Mobiles, a scrambler called Joe Btfsplk's Impending Disaster Machine, a shooting gallery called Scraggs Feudin' Range, a black light maze, and a swinging bridge. The Kissin' Rocks sculpture was also newly installed for the 1973 season. In 1974, more new attractions were added, including the thrill ride Hairless Joe's Kickapoo Barrel, an inflatable "bouncing bag," a replica Native American village, and craft shops where artisans demonstrated pottery making, leather working, and woodworking.

Success seemed to be on the horizon for Odom and Dogpatch USA, but the many unforeseen events of the 1970s cast a dark shadow on Odom's dreams. Attendance figures throughout that decade were woefully short of expectations. In 1973, interest rates began to skyrocket, and a nationwide energy crisis kept many tourists home. In a bout of cancellations nicknamed the Rural purge, American television networks eliminated many shows with country themes, and the popularity of hillbillies waned. The Li'l Abner restaurant chain was never built. The proposed Li'l Abner TV series was never made; a pilot was produced and premiered as a television special on ABC-TV, but it received poor reviews and no network purchased the series.

The mild winter weather which visited Arkansas through the mid-1970s proved to be the undoing of Marble Falls as a ski resort, and its snow cannons and slopes sat idle much of the time. The modest profits of Dogpatch USA were not sufficient to keep the two parks afloat, and Odom, already $2 million in debt, was forced to borrow an additional $1.5 million in the unfavorable financial atmosphere of 1973.

In 1974, Odom partnered with the Department of Speech and Dramatic Arts at the University of Arkansas to create an in-park repertory theater in a venture called "Arkansas Rediscovered" or the American Revolution Bicentennial Project. The group of student performers was named the "Boar's Head Players." Odom and the university planned for the group to perform well-known plays and short children's productions and to develop new plays based on the history and culture of Arkansas. They planned for the new plays to premiere at Marble Falls in 1976 as part of the United States Bicentennial celebration, and then the group would tour the state performing the new works.

In 1976, Union Planters Bank began foreclosure proceedings on $3.5 million in debts. In 1977, Al Capp and the Li'l Abner comic strip retired. Capp's retirement brought an end to one of the greatest advertisements for Dogpatch USA – the Li'l Abner comic strip. The same year, First National Bank of Little Rock began foreclosure proceedings on $600,000 in debts. In September of that year, Odom stated that, because Marble Falls had lost $50,000 to $100,000 a year since it opened, the ski slopes would be closed permanently. In subsequent years, various activities, including grass skiing, a gaming arcade, a 400-foot water slide, and a disco, were advertised at Marble Falls along with the resort accommodations. New attractions included the Slobbovian Sled Run, Grist Mill Puppet Theater, Rottin' Ralphies Rick-o-shay Rifle Range, and Barney Barnsmell's Skunk-works. New attractions in 1978 included Li'l Abner's Space Rocket, which was intended to simulate a flight into space.

Two personal injury lawsuits, seeking more than $200,000 in compensation, were brought against Dogpatch USA in 1979 and settled in 1980. By 1979, Dogpatch USA's income was less than its operating expenses, and attempts by Odom to get the town of Harrison, and later Jasper, to issue tourism bonds to refinance millions of dollars of debt were unsuccessful. That same year Odom announced that negotiations had been underway to sell the park to a private nonprofit group called God's Patch, Inc., which would turn Dogpatch USA into a Biblical-themed amusement park, but funding never materialized. New attractions in 1980 included a trained bear act, Castle's Country Bears, and the Shmoo, a character from the Li'l Abner comic strip, which appeared for the first time among the park's costumed characters.

The heat wave of 1980, one of the worst in Arkansas's history, made that year one of the worst for the park and marked the second consecutive year that Dogpatch USA operated without sufficient income. In October 1980, Union Planters Bank filed to take possession of both Dogpatch USA and Marble Falls. A month later, Dogpatch USA filed for bankruptcy. Union Planters Bank put Dogpatch USA up for sale in order to pay off $7 million' worth of loans.

=== OEI ownership ===
In 1981, Ozarks Entertainment, Inc. (OEI) bought Dogpatch USA for an undisclosed amount; it would retain ownership through 1986. Taking the park in new directions, OEI, under the leadership of General Manager Wayne Thompson, reduced the park staff by more than 50% and added many attractions. The amphitheater hosted concerts featuring stars such as Reba McEntire, Hank Thompson, and Ike and Tina Turner.

Thompson also brought in the corporate sponsorship of Coca-Cola, Dr Pepper, and Tyson Foods, and superheroes including Spider-Man, Batman and Robin, and Captain America for personal appearances and autograph signing. Gospel and bluegrass shows were presented. Denver Pyle (Uncle Jesse from the popular TV series The Dukes of Hazzard) was signed as the park's spokesman both onsite and in TV commercials. Dogpatch admission was relatively cheap compared to other theme parks around the country; a Money magazine survey in 1986 found that admission for a family of four was $34 at Dogpatch, while it was $84 at Disney World.

In 1981, Dogpatch Caverns and Old Man Moses Cave were sold to Bruce Raney (grandson of Albert Raney, Sr.) and a fellow investor. Old Man Moses Cave was renamed "Crystal Dome" and "Dogpatch Caverns" became "Mystic Caverns" again. According to Mystic Caverns' owners, the Crystal Dome was subsequently renovated and opened to the public for the first time in August 1981. Managed by Raney until they were sold to Omni Properties, Inc. in 1984, the twin caves continue to operate as tourist attractions.

In the 1980s, the ownership of Marble Falls was divided and changed until it became so entangled in legal problems that it was impossible to clearly identify who actually owned each part of the property. In 1982, Odom, under the name "Buffalo River Resorts," began selling parcels of the resort for timeshares and condominiums; however, in June 1983, The Arkansas Time Share Act made it illegal to sell the timeshares because the banks held liens on the property. A 1984 court ruling created an exception for Buffalo River Resorts, although buyers had to be informed that the banks held liens on the property and thus could hypothetically repossess the timeshares if Odom's companies failed to pay their debts. This was followed by a drop in timeshare sales.

=== Telcor ownership ===
In 1987, The Entertainment and Leisure Corporation (Telcor) purchased a 90% stake in OEI. The other 10% was retained by Herb Dunn, Lynn Spradley and Jerry Maland, residents of the area. Telcor, a corporation formed to buy and manage theme parks and headed by Melvyn Bell of Bell Equities, owned two other parks at the time, Deer Forest Park in Coloma, Michigan, and Magic Springs in Hot Springs, Arkansas. Wayne Thompson, who was general manager of the park, became President of Telcor with Sam Southerland as Vice President. Thompson and Southerland were principal owners of OEI, and Southerland actually managed the finances for all three Telcor parks. Under Thompson's leadership Telcor made renovations and improvements, and a new ride called the "Space Shuttle" was added.

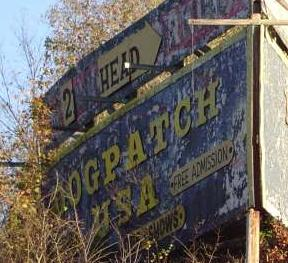
A faded billboard advertises free admission at Dogpatch USA. The free admission policy was introduced in 1991.

In 1988, Wayne Thompson departed, and Lynn Spradley, a Dogpatch USA veteran of 14 years, became GM and managed the park through the 1991 season. During this time Spradley bemoaned the fact that Dogpatch USA was forced to spend much more per patron on promotional strategies to attract visitors than other theme parks, and that most kids did not know who the Li'l Abner characters were. By this time the comic strip had been out of print for more than 10 years.

Dogpatch USA floundered in the face of stiff competition in the Telcor years, especially from Silver Dollar City, which duplicated most of what Dogpatch USA offered but on a grander scale, and was an hour's drive to the north. What Silver Dollar City lacked, the Ozark Folk Center (a fully subsidized state park) in nearby Mountain View provided, and neither park was wrapped in an outdated cartoon franchise.

In 1991, after concerns from civic leaders that the park would not open for the 1991 season due to financial problems, it was indicated that if the park opened at all, it would open as a scaled down arts and crafts park. General admission was eliminated; patrons paid for each individual attraction instead. Telcor decided to save the money that the Capp estate was receiving for use of the name and characters, and with that one of the most distinctive aspects of the park – the Li'l Abner theme – was completely dropped and the name changed to Dogpatch, Arkansas.

The park was closed permanently on October 14, 1993.

== Post-closure ==
On December 20, 1994, the park was put up for auction on the courthouse steps in Jasper. The auction was handled by Jim Sprott, a Harrison lawyer whose wife Jan had been "Daisy Mae" at Dogpatch USA from 1968 through the 1970 season; Sprott himself had played Earthquake McGoon and Luke Scraggs. C.L. and Ford Carr of Leisuretek Corporation and Westek Corporation received a quit claim for the property. At that time, however, they neglected to do anything with the park.

In 1988 Debra Nielson began buying parcels of the Dogpatch property. Eventually the area she owned included the ski lodge, convention center, roller rink, and motel. She renamed the acreage "Serenity Mountain". She moved into the Ski Lodge and operated a bed and breakfast there. She also opened a nondenominational church in one of the abandoned resort buildings. In December 1999 Nielson leased the abandoned skating rink to the Humane Enforcement and Legal Protection or HELP. HELP was a non profit group that provided therapeutic horse back riding free of charge.

In 1997, in response to a petition by residents, the U.S. Post Office changed the name of the Dogpatch Post Office back to Marble Falls, as it had been prior to 1968.

In November 2001, the park's owner at that time, Melvyn Bell, was indicted by a federal grand jury for tax evasion. The trial was delayed repeatedly, due to Bell's health issues, and ultimately dismissed when he died January 2002. Security Bank of Harrison foreclosed on the Dogpatch USA property in order to recover $485,000 in debt from Bell.

In late 2002, Ford Carr had the 141-acre (0.57 km^{2}) site placed on eBay with a minimum bid requirement of $1 million. Although he was looking for a $4 million bid, there were no bidders. In 2005, it was reported by Arkansas Business that the property was for sale with an asking price $5 million, but the price was "very negotiable."

In 2005, 17-year-old Pruett Nance was driving an ATV through the property. Nance said he had permission from the owners to tour the property. While riding, Nance collided with a length of wire strung between two trees, and was severely injured and nearly decapitated. The question of whether or not the wire was put there maliciously, to dissuade vandalism, became the subject of a lawsuit the Nances filed against the park's owners. The suit eventually ended up in the Arkansas Supreme Court, which ruled in favor of Nance. Nance was awarded $100,000 in compensatory damages and $150,000 in punitive damages, and his father, Stewart Nance, was awarded $400,000 in compensatory damages, for medical bills. When the park owners did not pay the judgment, the deed to Dogpatch was awarded to Pruett Nance, who became the new owner of the park.

A few businesses have revived sections of the Marble Falls property. Nielson sold some of the property to Fred Mullins, who opened an RV Park on the site of the former campgrounds. In 2004, Nielson sold another portion of the property, including the convention center, motel, restaurant, ice-skating rink, and a strip mall to Bob Richards and Randal Phillips. Phillips and his wife Debbie reopened it as "The Hub", a motorcycle-themed resort. The Hub featured a 50-room hotel and a convention facility that seated 1,500 in theater style. The Hub closed in 2017.

=== Bud Pelsor Ownership ===
On August 13, 2014, what was left of the park was sold again, this time to Charles "Bud" Pelsor, the inventor of a "spill-proof" dog bowl, and his partners for $2 million. Pelsor, who had recently purchased much of the surrounding land, announced that he planned to reopen the park as an ecotourism village. On December 8, 2014, the park was opened to the public for the first time since it had closed 21 years earlier. That weekend, over 5,000 visitors toured the property in anticipation of a grand opening date in the future. Pelsor's plans included restoring the stream, trout farm and mill, featuring music performances, and opening a restaurant. The reopened park, he said, would be named the Village at Dogpatch.

Three buildings burned on the Dogpatch Grounds on February 22, 2015; the buildings were a total loss. Newton County, Arkansas, officials have deemed the incident "suspicious". No one was reported to be injured in the blaze.

On May 16 and 17, the park was opened to the public for a second time. Several music groups performed, and artisans from around the Ozarks demonstrated and sold their crafts.

In March 2016, Pelsor put the park up for sale for $3 million, explaining that his business partner, James Robertson, wanted to sell his share of the park, but Pelsor could not afford to buy him out. Pelsor said he would happy to remain co-owner by selling just half the park to a new business partner.

In December 2017, Pelsor announced that he had reached an agreement to lease the park to Heritage USA, Inc., a company owned by David Hare (not to be confused with Heritage USA, a Christian theme park by the same name in South Carolina that closed in 1989). Hare intended to develop the property into Heritage USA Ozarks Resort at Historic Dogpatch beginning in March 2018. However, on August 20, 2018, Debra Nielson, the hotel's owner, filed a lawsuit in Newton County Circuit Court to evict David Hare from her property. The park became once again abandoned. Pelsor stated that Hare had fallen behind on lease payments. Even though he was continuing to make YouTube videos advertising the park, and vacationers had paid and left deposits on hotel rooms, the hotel was vacant and utilities were cut off, while Hare and Heritage USA had become unreachable. Court filings with Pulaski County Circuit Court show that Heritage had agreed to pay $5,500 a month for use of the property and in fact had never paid anything, in addition to not paying for insurance on the property which had also been cancelled, leading to what Nielson described as an emergency situation. It also alleges an inspection showed "significant damage to the premises." Nielson's attorney has stated that a process to serve Hare with legal papers has been ongoing, but so far he has exhausted all means available to him to find Hare.

On December 15, 2019, Pelsor was served with a foreclosure notice. Owing $922,000 on a $1 million promissory note supposed to be paid off earlier in August that year, and also facing a lawsuit, he decided to leave the state.

=== Johnny Morris and Bass Pro Shops ===
The park was planned to be put up for auction on the Newton County courthouse steps on March 3, 2020, but a "Motion to Cancel Foreclosure Sale" was filed in Newton County Circuit Court on February 27. The Nances, who still held the mortgage on Dogpatch, postponed the auction for two months pending contract negotiations with a new buyer. On June 5, 2020, paperwork was filed at Newton County Circuit Court in Jasper indicating the park had been sold for $1.12 Million. The new owners were listed as Down By the Falls LLC, a corporation created in Delaware but with a Springfield, Missouri, street address.

By August 2020 the new owner had been revealed as Johnny Morris, founder of Bass Pro Shops. He expressed his desire to take time and restore the park, though did not reveal specific plans saying only everything was in the early stages and that it would be "An ode to the heritage of the Ozarks and the abundant wildlife and natural beauty found here".

On September 28, 2021, Bob Ziehmer, senior director of conservation for Bass Pro Shops, presented a plan to the Buffalo River Conservation Committee, held in the Jasper School Cafeteria. The proposed plan will be to create a smaller version of the Dogwood Canyon Nature Park in Lampe, Missouri, which features a working mill, restaurant, trout fishing, fly-fishing lessons, wildlife tours, horseback riding, and education programs on conservation.

== Attractions ==
Trout Pond - Park visitors could rent fishing equipment and go fishing in the pond, which was deliberately overstocked so it would be easy to catch fish. Visitors could fish as much as they wanted and only had to pay for the fish they caught. The Dogpatch restaurant could prepare and serve guests' caught fish, or Dogpatch workers could clean and pack the fish in ice for guests to take home.

The pond was part of a trout farm that was operated by Albert Raney and his family beginning in the 1930s. In 1966, Raney sold the Trout Pond to the developers of Dogpatch USA, Recreation Enterprises.

Dogpatch Caverns - A nearby show cave that was incorporated into the park. It had been a tourist attraction since the late 1920s, and in 1949 it was purchased by the Raney family and named Mystic Caverns. It was sold to the developers of Dogpatch USA in 1966, who renamed it "Dogpatch Caverns." The cave was renovated and many safety issues were addressed. During renovations a second cave was discovered adjacent to it; it was named "Old Man Moses Cave" after a Li'l Abner cartoon character, and barricaded to preserve its pristine condition. According to some sources, "Old Man Moses Cave" was open to visitors in the 1969 season. Both caves were sold in 1981. "Dogpatch Caverns" was renamed "Mystic Caverns" once more, "Old Man Moses Cave" was renamed "Crystal Dome," and, according to the current owners of the caves, it was at this time that "Old Man Moses Cave" was finally opened for tours.

Peter Bella Grist Mill - This was a historic mill originally built on the property in 1834. It was restored during the initial construction of Dogpatch in 1968. It fell into disrepair after the park's closure.

West Po'k Chop Speshul- This was a miniature train with passenger cars. It carried guests on a circular track around the park. At the time of its construction, it was the first and only railroad in Newton County, Arkansas.

Cornvention Center - This was a venue where musical performances were given.

Frustratin' Flyer - This was a steel Wild Mouse roller coaster. It was a "Monster Mouse" model manufactured by the Allan Herschell Company. Installed in 1968 for the park's debut, it operated until 1991. Dogpatch USA brochures after 1973 continued to show a Monster Mouse in operation. The mouse was sold between the 1991 and 1992 season.

Earthquake McGoon's Brain Rattler - This was a toboggan roller coaster by Chance Rides. In early brochures it was depicted as being a track wrapped around an enormous tree, but the ride was actually made of metal. Since 1993, the ride has operated as the Wild & Wooly Toboggan at Little Amerricka amusement park in Marshall, Wisconsin.

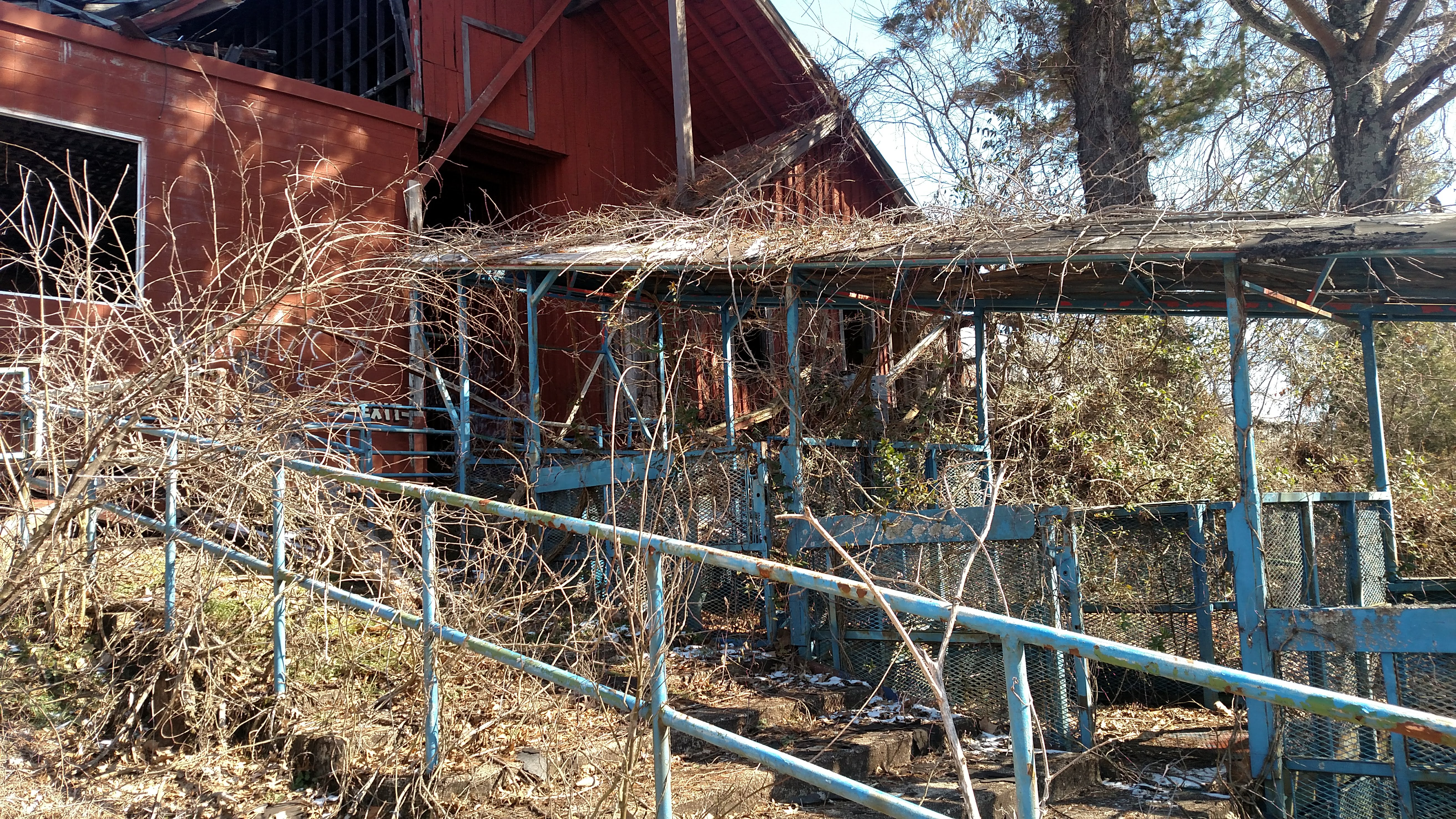
The tram...

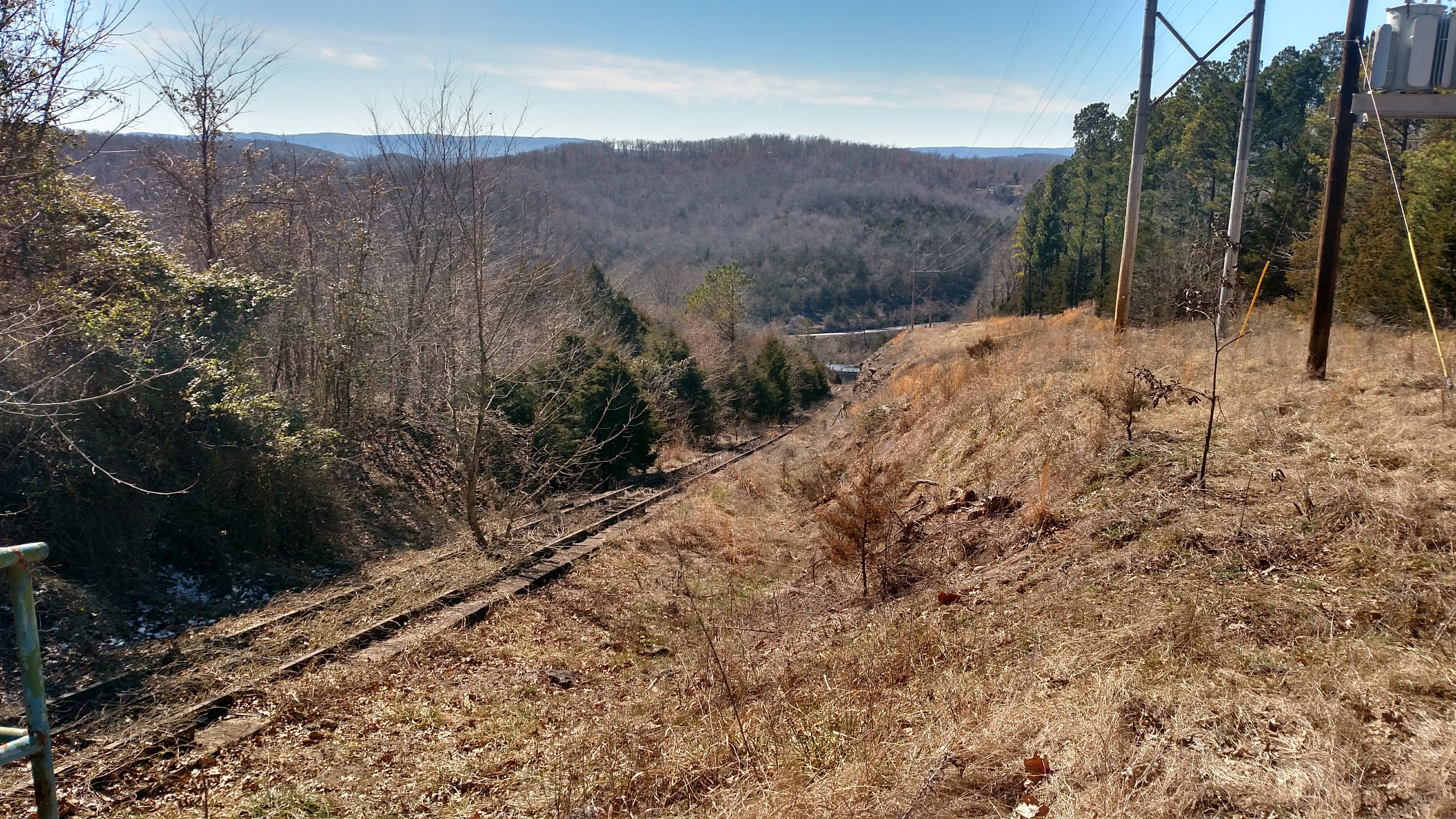
...descended the valley to the park.

Funicular Tram - A "decliner inliner", the tram was used to transport visitors from the parking lot into the park below. It was purchased from an unknown manufacturer in Switzerland and shipped to Dogpatch USA at a cost of $250,000. Installed in 1970 and opened at the beginning of the 1971 season, it could transport 1,700 guests per hour at a speed of 13.5 feet per second (4.1 m/s). As passengers descended into the Dogpatch USA valley they were given a short monologue about the park over the tram's PA system.

Boat Train Ride - This ride was introduced at the beginning of the 1972 season. A motorized lead boat piloted by a Dogpatch employee pulled a train of non-motorized boats behind it. The boats followed a route going up creek to the Grist Mill and back again.

Hairless Joe's Kickapoo Barrel - This ride was introduced in the 1974 season. It was a rotating thrill ride.

Barney Barnsmell's Skunk Works - This was introduced in 1977. It was a building full of complicated contraptions reminiscent of Rube Goldberg's designs. The machinery's purpose was the production of homemade soap; the Springfield News-Leader referred to the attraction as the "Skunk Works Soap Factory."

Slobbovian Sled Run - This was introduced in the 1977 season. Guests rode on sleds mounted on teflon runners. The sled run was intended to operate similarly to a waterslide but without water.

Li'l Abner's Space Rocket - The ride was added in 1978. It was a simulated trip into outer space.

Trash Eaters - The park had trash cans equipped with huge animal heads that "ate" (sucked) the trash out of patrons' hands. The heads were shaped like goats, pigs, and even razorbacks, and the unusual design encouraged patrons to properly dispose of their litter by making it an amusing experience.

Dogpatch Cabins - Guests could tour several cabins that were the "homes" of various Li'l Abner characters. These included Mammy and Pappy Yokum's house and Li'l Abner and Daisy Mae's house. Some of the cabins were authentic cabins from elsewhere in the Ozarks that had been purchased and rebuilt at the park during its 1968 construction.
