= Gold Hill, Arkansas =

- Unincorporated community
- Gold Hill's position in Arkansas. Gold Hill, Arkansas (the United States)
- Coordinates: 35°11′45″N 92°57′43″W
- Country: United States
- State: Arkansas
- County: Pope
- Township: Wilson
- Elevation: 341 ft (104 m)
- Time zone: UTC-6 (Central (CST))
  - Summer (DST): UTC-5 (CDT)
- GNIS feature ID: 62134

Gold Hill is an unincorporated community in Wilson Township, Pope County, Arkansas, United States.
