= Oak Grove, Pope County, Arkansas =

Oak Grove, Arkansas
- Census-designated place
- Oak Grove's position in Arkansas. Oak Grove, Arkansas (the United States)
- Coordinates: 35°21′34″N 92°57′35″W
- Country: United States
- State: Arkansas
- County: Pope
- Elevation: 551 ft (168 m)

Population (2020)
  - Total: 177
- Time zone: UTC-6 (Central (CST))
  - Summer (DST): UTC-5 (CDT)
- GNIS feature ID: 2805668

Oak Grove is an unincorporated community and census-designated place (CDP) in Moreland Township, Pope County, Arkansas, United States. It was first listed as a CDP in the 2020 census with a population of 177.

== Demographics ==
Historical population
Census	Pop.	Note	%±
2020	177		—
U.S. Decennial Census; 2020

=== 2020 census ===
Oak Grove CDP, Arkansas – Demographic Profile (NH = Non-Hispanic) Note: the US Census treats Hispanic/Latino as an ethnic category. This table excludes Latinos from the racial categories and assigns them to a separate category. Hispanics/Latinos may be of any race.
Race / Ethnicity	Pop 2020	% 2020
White alone (NH)	148	83.62%
Black or African American alone (NH)	0	0.00%
Native American or Alaska Native alone (NH)	6	3.39%
Asian alone (NH)	4	2.26%
Pacific Islander alone (NH)	0	0.00%
Some Other Race alone (NH)	0	0.00%
Mixed Race/Multi-Racial (NH)	17	9.60%
Hispanic or Latino (any race)	2	1.13%
Total	177	100.00%

== Education ==
It is in the Atkins School District, which operates Atkins High School.
