= Atkins, Arkansas =

- City
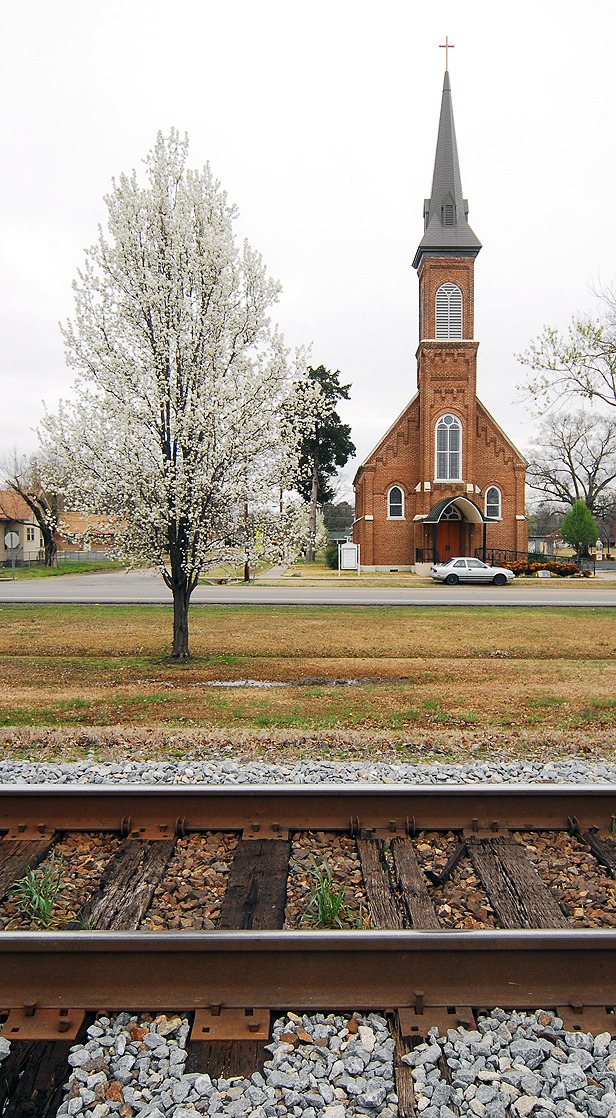
- Atkins Roman Catholic Church of the Assumption

- Location of Atkins in Pope County, Arkansas.

- Location in Arkansas.
- Coordinates: 35°14′37″N 92°56′18″W
- Country: United States
- State: Arkansas
- County: Pope

Area
  - Total: 6.14 sq mi (15.89 km^{2})
  - Land: 6.13 sq mi (15.88 km^{2})
  - Water: 0.0039 sq mi (0.01 km^{2})
- Elevation: 367 ft (112 m)

Population (2020)
  - Total: 2,859
  - Estimate (2025): 2,868 ▲
  - Density: 466.4/sq mi (180.09/km^{2})
- Time zone: UTC−06:00 (Central (CST))
  - Summer (DST): UTC−05:00 (CDT)
- ZIP Code: 72823
- Area code: 479
- FIPS code: 05-02590
- GNIS feature ID: 2403125
- Website: atkinscity.org

Atkins is a city in Pope County, Arkansas, United States. The population was 2,859 at the 2020 census. It is part of the Russellville Micropolitan Statistical Area.

== History ==
The town is named after Elisha Atkins, a Boston sugar importer who financed the Little Rock and Fort Smith Railroad which spawned the growth of the town after the Civil War. It was formally platted in 1872. Atkins built its first school in 1875 and boasted its own newspaper, the Atkins Chronicle in 1894. The town served as a local cotton depot with a number of cotton gins operating in town. The 1927 flooding of the Arkansas River damaged the town and subsequent road buildings gradually shifted the town to orient northwards away from the river.

Atkins was the site of the Goldsmith Pickle Company which started producing pickled cucumbers in 1946. The town thus laid claim to be the "Pickle Capital of the World" with some 1,200 acres (490 ha) devoted to growing cucumbers. Along the same line Atkins was the original home of the fried dill pickle, created by Bernell “Fatman” Austin. The pickle plant came under owners through the years until 2002 when the plant shuttered but left the town with the two-day "Picklefest" legacy held each May.

== Geography ==
Atkins is located at 35°14′37″N 92°56′18″W (35.243485, -92.938212).

According to the United States Census Bureau, the city has a total area of 6.1 square miles (16 km^{2}), all land. Many Atkins residents commute to nearby Russellville for work, school, and recreation.

== Demographics ==
Historical population
Census	Pop.	Note	%±
1880	519		—
1890	660		27.2%
1900	745		12.9%
1910	1,258		68.9%
1920	1,529		21.5%
1930	1,364		−10.8%
1940	1,322		−3.1%
1950	1,291		−2.3%
1960	1,391		7.7%
1970	2,015		44.9%
1980	3,002		49.0%
1990	2,834		−5.6%
2000	2,878		1.6%
2010	3,016		4.8%
2020	2,859		−5.2%
2025 (est.)	2,868	▲	0.3%
U.S. Decennial Census; 2014 Estimate

=== 2020 census ===
As of the 2020 census, Atkins had a population of 2,859. The median age was 40.8 years. 23.7% of residents were under the age of 18 and 21.3% were 65 years of age or older. For every 100 females, there were 88.7 males, and for every 100 females age 18 and over there were 86.0 males.

There were 1,153 households in Atkins, including 759 families. Of those households, 32.7% had children under the age of 18 living in them. 46.4% were married-couple households, 17.1% were households with a male householder and no spouse or partner present, and 29.8% were households with a female householder and no spouse or partner present. About 29.0% of all households were made up of individuals and 13.2% had someone living alone who was 65 years of age or older.

There were 1,286 housing units, of which 10.3% were vacant. The homeowner vacancy rate was 1.0% and the rental vacancy rate was 11.7%. 0.0% of residents lived in urban areas, while 100.0% lived in rural areas.

Atkins racial composition
Race	Number	Percentage
White (non-Hispanic)	2,556	89.4%
Black or African American (non-Hispanic)	21	0.73%
Native American	19	0.66%
Asian	7	0.24%
Pacific Islander	1	0.03%
Other/Mixed	156	5.46%
Hispanic or Latino	99	3.46%

=== 2010 census ===
As of the census of 2010, there were 3,016 people in 1,118 households, including 849 families, in the city. The population density was 471.8 inhabitants per square mile (182.2/km^{2}). There were 1,288 housing units at an average density of 211.1 per square mile (81.5/km^{2}). The racial makeup of the city was 95.6% White, 0.9% Black or African American, 0.8% Native American, 0.1% Asian, 1.2% from other races, and 1.2% from two or more races. 2.3% of the population were Hispanic or Latino of any race.

Of the 1,118 households 30.4% had children under the age of 18 living with them, 53% were married couples living together, 12.1% had a female householder with no husband present, and 28.4% were non-families. 25.3% of households were one person and 11.2% were one person aged 65 or older. The average household size was 2.50 and the average family size was 2.95.

The age distribution was 23.4% under the age of 18, 9.4% from 18 to 24, 25% from 25 to 44, 24.5% from 45 to 64, and 17.7% 65 or older. The median age was 38.8 years. For every 100 females, there were 90.4 males. For every 100 females age 18 and over, there were 90.7 males.

The median household income was $40,112 and the median family income was $49,754. Males had a median income of $33,191 versus $38,833 for females. The per capita income for the city was $18,605. About 6.4% of families and 8.8% of the population were below the poverty line, including 6.3% of those under age 18 and 7.9% of those age 65 or over.

== Notable people ==
- Ellis Kinder, major league baseball pitcher; Atkins native
- Wilson Matthews, former University of Arkansas assistant football coach; Atkins native
- Norris Church Mailer, writer, wife of Norman Mailer
