= National Register of Historic Places listings in Perry County, Arkansas =

Location of Perry County in Arkansas

This is a list of the National Register of Historic Places listings in Perry County, Arkansas.

This is intended to be a complete list of the properties and districts on the National Register of Historic Places in Perry County, Arkansas, United States. The locations of National Register properties and districts for which the latitude and longitude coordinates are included below, may be seen in a map.

There are 14 properties and districts listed on the National Register in the county.

Contents: Counties in Arkansas
- Arkansas
- Ashley
- Baxter
- Benton
- Boone
- Bradley
- Calhoun
- Carroll
- Chicot
- Clark
- Clay
- Cleburne
- Cleveland
- Columbia
- Conway
- Craighead
- Crawford
- Crittenden
- Cross
- Dallas
- Desha
- Drew
- Faulkner
- Franklin
- Fulton
- Garland
- Grant
- Greene
- Hempstead
- Hot Spring
- Howard
- Independence
- Izard
- Jackson
- Jefferson
- Johnson
- Lafayette
- Lawrence
- Lee
- Lincoln
- Little River
- Logan
- Lonoke
- Madison
- Marion
- Miller
- Mississippi
- Monroe
- Montgomery
- Nevada
- Newton
- Ouachita
- Perry
- Phillips
- Pike
- Poinsett
- Polk
- Pope
- Prairie
- Pulaski (Little Rock)
- Randolph
- St. Francis
- Saline
- Scott
- Searcy
- Sebastian
- Sevier
- Sharp
- Stone
- Union
- Van Buren
- Washington
- White
- Woodruff
- Yell

This National Park Service list is complete through NPS recent listings posted December 19, 2025.

== Current listings ==
	Name on the Register	Image	Date listed	Location	City or town	Description
1	Bigelow Methodist Episcopal Church, South	Bigelow Methodist Episcopal Church, South	April 4, 1996 (#96000353)	West of the junction of Volman and Emma Sts. 34°59′57″N 92°37′49″W	Bigelow	
2	Bigelow Rosenwald School	Bigelow Rosenwald School	May 26, 2004 (#04000491)	Junction of Highway 60 and Bethel AME Rd. 35°04′30″N 92°33′55″W	Toad Suck	
3	Camp House	Camp House	September 30, 2013 (#13000787)	4684 W. AR 60; 34°58′23″N 92°59′08″W	Aplin	
4	Camp Ouachita Girl Scout Camp Historic District	Camp Ouachita Girl Scout Camp Historic District	February 3, 1992 (#90001826)	Area surrounding and north of Lake Sylvia in the Ouachita National Forest; 34°52′12″N 92°49′15″W	Paron	
5	Fourche LaFave River Bridge	Fourche LaFave River Bridge	May 26, 1995 (#95000643)	Highway 7 over the Fourche La Fave River; 34°57′07″N 93°09′08″W	Nimrod	
6	Hawks Schoolhouse	Hawks Schoolhouse	January 28, 2002 (#01001528)	County Road 7; 34°52′06″N 93°12′30″W	Ava	
7	Hollis Country Store	Hollis Country Store	December 27, 2002 (#02001598)	2125 Highway 7, S. 34°52′28″N 93°06′38″W	Hollis	
8	Houston Methodist Episcopal Church, South	Houston Methodist Episcopal Church, South	May 20, 1994 (#94000494)	Southwestern side of Highway 60, near its junction with Highway 216; 35°01′54″N 92°41′33″W	Houston	
9	Perry County Courthouse	Perry County Courthouse	July 6, 1976 (#76000443)	Main and Pine Sts. 35°00′19″N 92°48′07″W	Perryville	
10	Perry Rock Island Railroad Depot	Perry Rock Island Railroad Depot	January 8, 2021 (#100006027)	8 German Rd. 35°02′56″N 92°47′43″W	Perry	
11	Perryville American Legion Building	Perryville American Legion Building	September 5, 1990 (#90001377)	408 W. Main Street; 35°00′18″N 92°48′12″W	Perryville	
12	Perryville Commercial Historic District	Perryville Commercial Historic District	January 26, 2012 (#11001048)	Roughly bounded by Arkansas Highway 60, Magnolia, Main & Plum Sts. 35°00′17″N 92°48′07″W	Perryville	
13	C.L. Sailor House	C.L. Sailor House	July 23, 1998 (#98000880)	Wilson St. 34°59′44″N 92°37′58″W	Bigelow	
14	Wallace Bridge	Wallace Bridge	August 1, 2008 (#08000724)	County Road 18; 34°56′11″N 93°03′19″W	Nimrod	

== Former listings ==
	Name on the Register	Image	Date listed	Date removed	Location	City or town	Description
1	Cypress Creek Bridge	Cypress Creek Bridge	April 9, 1990 (#90000537)	January 14, 2002	County Road 64, over Cypress Creek	Perry vicinity	
2	South Fourche LaFave River Bridge	South Fourche LaFave River Bridge	September 24, 2004 (#04001044)	January 8, 2025	Highway 7; 34°52′22″N 93°06′38″W	Hollis	

== See also ==
- List of National Historic Landmarks in Arkansas
- National Register of Historic Places listings in Arkansas
