= Ava, Arkansas =

- Unincorporated community
- Location within Arkansas Location within the United States
- Coordinates: 34°52′10″N 93°12′20″W
- Country: United States
- State: Arkansas
- County: Perry
- Elevation: 568 ft (173 m)
- Time zone: UTC-6 (Central (CST))
  - Summer (DST): UTC-5 (CDT)
- Area code: 501
- GNIS feature ID: 65184

Ava is an unincorporated community in Perry County, Arkansas, United States. The community is 25 miles (40 km) west-southwest of Perryville. It is located on the south side of the South Fourche La Fave River floodplain and Arkansas Highway 314 passes on the north side of the river.

The Hawks Schoolhouse, which is listed on the National Register of Historic Places, is near the community.
