= Irven D. and Irven G. McDaniel =

American architects, father and son

Irven D. McDaniel (1894-1960) was an architect based in Arkansas and Tennessee and Irven G. McDaniel was his son and also an architect who practiced in Hot Springs, Arkansas.

The senior Irven was born Irven Donald McDaniel on April 14, 1894, in Holland, Faulkner County, Arkansas. He married Camille Lewis, of Arkansas, in 1920.

The junior, Irven Granger McDaniel was the third of their four children. He was born in Tennessee but grew up mostly in Hot Springs, Arkansas. He served as a pilot with the Royal Air Force during World War II and was taken as a prisoner of war. Imprisoned in Stalag Luft III in Poland, he and some of his experiences have been said to be a model for Virgil Hilts, the Steve McQueen character in the movie The Great Escape. Granger reportedly escaped multiple times and came to be called the "cooler king", for being sent to the cooler upon recapture. Unlike Virgil Hilts, Granger was able to study architecture from a Polish architecture professor also imprisoned.

Irven G. practiced architecture in Hot Springs, designing the historically significant Van Lyell House and the Jack Tar Hotel and Bathhouse (AKA Garland Towers)."

== Works ==
=== Irven D. McDaniel ===
Irven D. McDaniel's works include:

- Greenwood School (1930, 1950), in Greenwood, Arkansas, appears to have been nominated to the National Register in 2018. It was built in Art Deco style in 1930, and expanded in International style in 1950, with both phases designed by McDaniel.
- Dr. Albert H. Tribble House (1938), Hot Springs, possibly a design by McDaniel
- Perry Plaza Court Historic District (1947), Hot Springs, a tourist accommodation in International style
- Billings-Cole House (1948, 1952), Malvern, Arkansas, International style

Papers of Irven D. McDaniel are held in special collections holdings of the University of Arkansas.

=== Irven G. McDaniel ===
Irven G. McDaniel's works include:

- Jack Tar Hotel and Bathhouse (1950s), Hot Springs, also known as Garland Towers, a tourist accommodation in International style. NRHP-listed
- Van Lyell House, Hot Springs, AR (McDaniel, Granger), NRHP-listed

== Later life ==
Irven D. McDaniel died March 16, 1960, and his remains are buried in Greenwood Cemetery in Garland County, Arkansas.

Irven G. McDaniel eventually retired and went to Boca Raton, Florida.

== Related sites ==
Sites which may possibly be related include:

- Catlin Bridge, N of Rockville off US 41 Rockville, IN McDaniel, C.
- Nichol House, 205 Park Pl. Pine Bluff, AR McDaniel & Brassell (which?)
- One or more works in Perryville Commercial Historic District, Roughly bounded by AR 10, Magnolia, Main & Plum Sts. Perryville, AR McDaniels, Erwin (probably a typo for Irwen, but which, the father or son?)
- St. Paul Methodist Episcopal Church, 426 N. Morgan St. Rushville, IN McDaniel, David W. (probably not related?)
