= Keith Carter (basketball) =

American college athletics administrator

Ole Miss Rebels
- Title: Athletic director
- League: Southeastern Conference

Personal information
- Born: October 17, 1976 (age 50)
- Listed height: 6 ft 4 in (1.93 m)
- Listed weight: 185 lb (84 kg)

Career information
- High school: Perryville (Perryville, Arkansas)
- College: Ole Miss (1995–1999)
- NBA draft: 1999: undrafted
- Playing career: 1999–2008
- Position: Shooting guard
- Number: 14, 33

Career history
- 1999–2000: New Mexico Slam
- 2000–2001: Memphis Houn'Dawgs
- 2001–2002: Orlandina
- 2002–2003: Dakota Wizards
- 2003–2004: Teramo Basket
- 2004–2005: Basket Napoli
- 2005–2006: Orlandina
- 2006–2007: Varese
- 2007–2008: Veroli Basket

Career highlights
- First-team All-SEC (1999); Second-team All-SEC (1998)
Medals
Men's basketball
Representing United States
Goodwill Games
Gold medal – first place	1998 New York	Team competition

Joseph Keith Carter (born October 17, 1976) is an American college athletics administrator, currently the athletic director for the Ole Miss Rebels of the Southeastern Conference. Carter played professional basketball for nine seasons, primarily in Italy.

Carter came to Ole Miss from Perryville High School in Perryville, Arkansas. He was a four-year starter for the Rebels from 1995 to 1999, earning second-team All-Southeastern Conference honors as a junior and first team as a senior. Carter was also named an honorable mention All-American by the Associated Press in 1999. For his college career, Carter scored 1,682 points. Following his college career, Carter played professionally in several American leagues before settling into a successful career in Italy.

After his playing career, Carter joined the Ole Miss athletic department in 2009 and was named executive director of the school's athletic foundation. Following Ross Bjork's resignation as athletic director, Carter was named to the post on an interim basis. The interim tag was removed on November 20, 2019.
