= South Fourche La Fave River =

Stream in the Ouachita Mountains

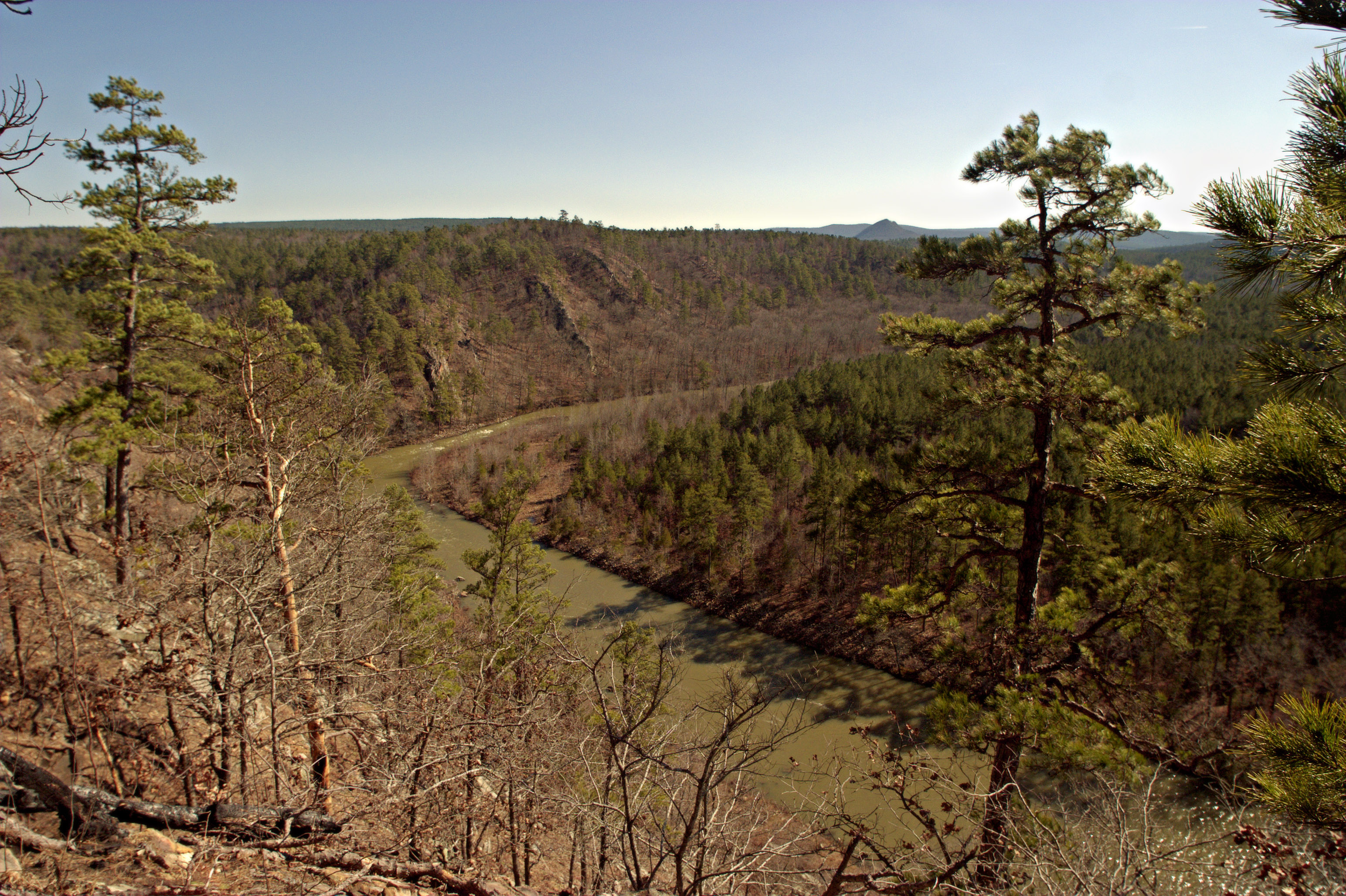
The South Fourche LaFave River, Ouachita Mountains, Arkansas

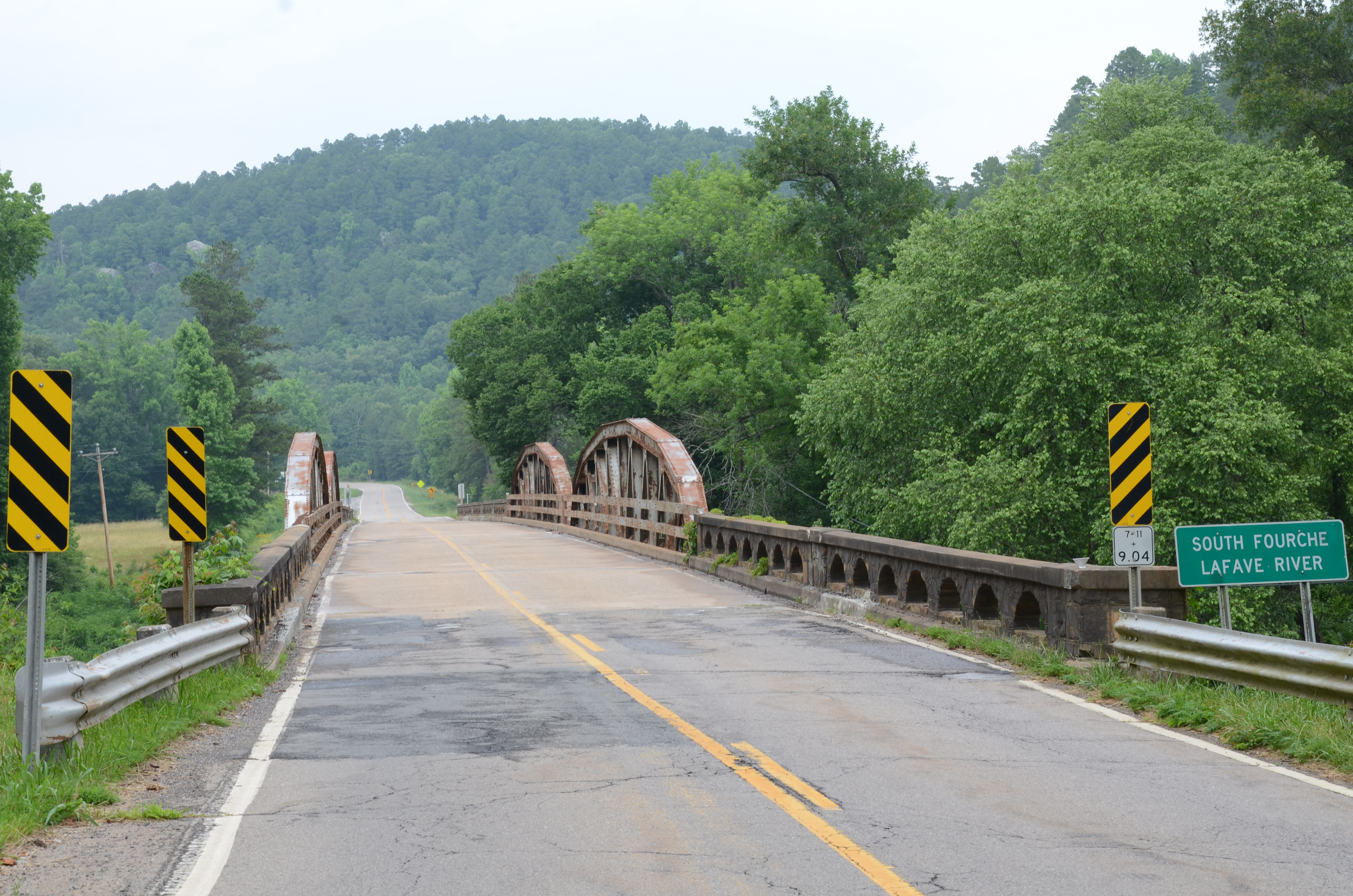
The South Fourche LaFave River Bridge over the river on Route 7

The South Fourche La Fave River is a stream in the Ouachita Mountains of Perry and Yell counties of Arkansas. It is a tributary of the Fourche La Fave River.

The headwaters arise southwest of the Allen Peak Lookout Tower (at 34°50′47″N 93°28′26″W) and the stream flows east-northeast. It flows under Arkansas Highway 27 just south of Onyx and then parallel to Arkansas Highway 314 past Steve and Hollis. It passes under Arkansas Route 7 and flows north and east to its confluence with the Fourche La Fave River east of Nimrod (at 34°57′14″N 93°01′57″W).

The South Fourche LaFave River has a mean annual discharge of 295 cubic feet (8.4 m^{3}) per second, according to statistics from the USGS station at Hollis.
