= Hollis Country Store =

- U.S. National Register of Historic Places
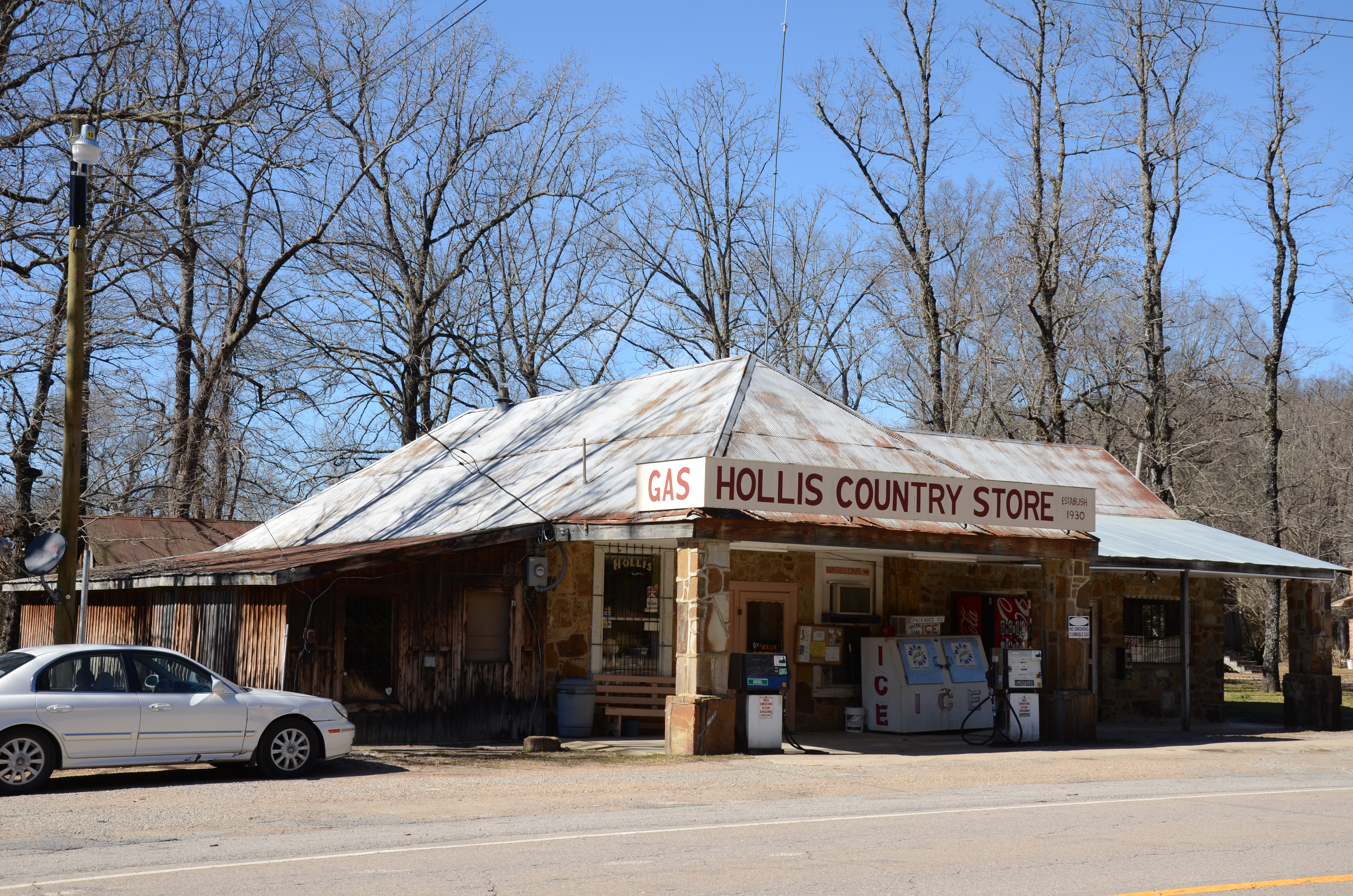

- Location within Arkansas Location within the United States
- Location: 2125 AR 7 S, Hollis, Arkansas
- Coordinates: 34°52′28″N 93°6′38″W
- Area: 1.2 acres (0.49 ha)
- Built: 1932
- Built by: Mike Gross and William Furr
- Architectural style: Bungalow/craftsman, Plain/Traditional
- MPS: Arkansas Highway History and Architecture MPS
- NRHP reference No.: 02001598
- Added to NRHP: December 27, 2002

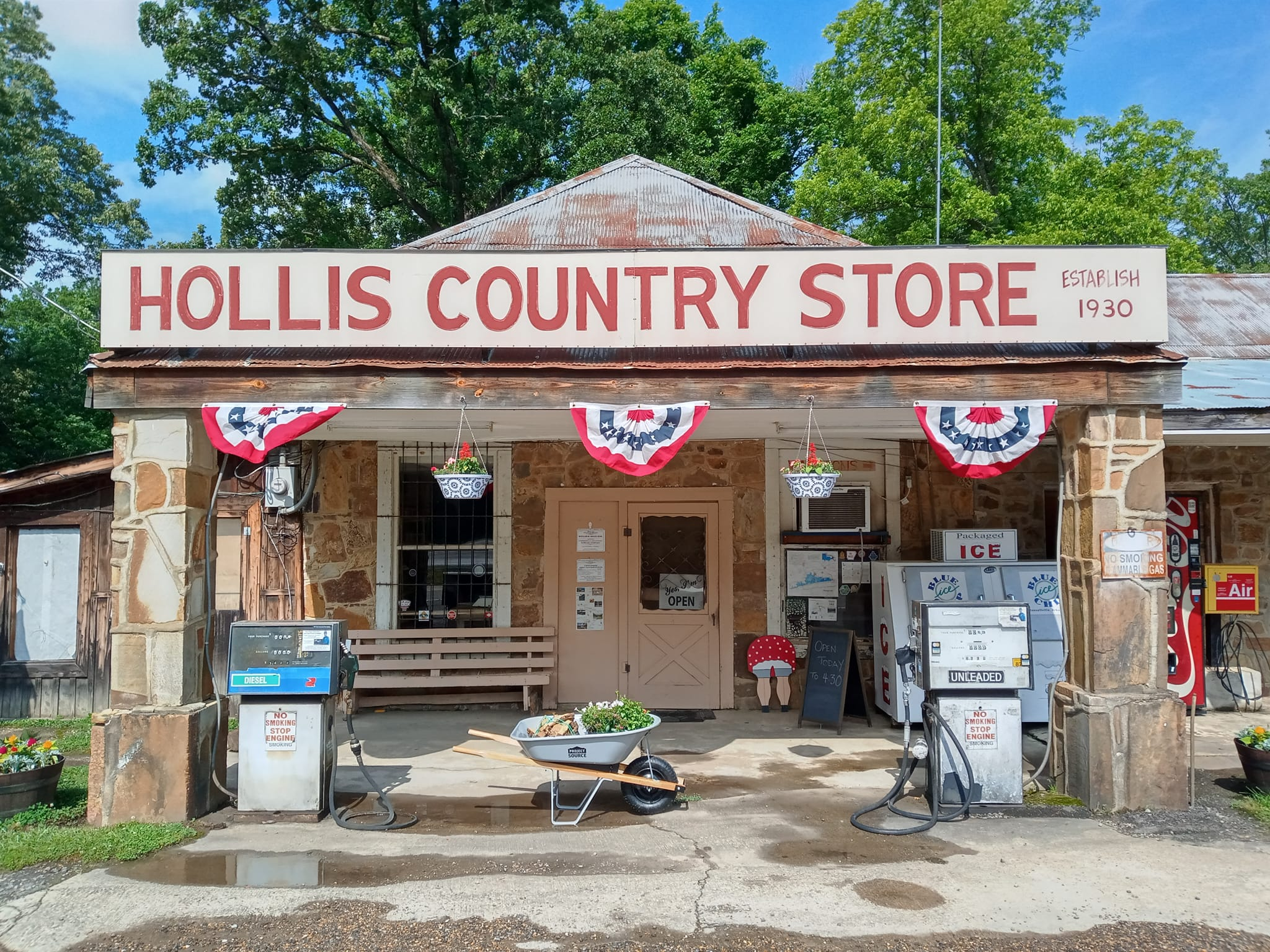
Hollis Country Store - 2023

The Hollis Country Store is a historic general store on Arkansas Highway 7 in rural Perry County, Arkansas. It is located on the west side of AR 7 in the Ouachita National Forest, a short way north of the South Fourche LaFave River Bridge. In addition to the store, the property includes a picnic shelter a tourist cabin. The core of the store is a stone structure built in 1931–32, with most of the other parts added in the 1950s. It is an excellent example of vernacular roadside architecture from the period.

The property was listed on the National Register of Historic Places in 2002.

Originally built by Mike Gross and William (Bill) Furr, the store was purchased in 1940 by Dennis and Lillie Crain. Members of the Crain family have operated the store since 1940. Current owners are Donnie and Gena Crain, the 4th generation of owners from the Crain family. The store is a popular destination with Arkansas Scenic Highway 7 travelers for its nostalgia, old time candy and sodas, homemade pies, and bologna sandwiches.

== See also ==
- National Register of Historic Places listings in Perry County, Arkansas
