= Camp House (Aplin, Arkansas) =

Historic house in Arkansas, United States

- U.S. National Register of Historic Places
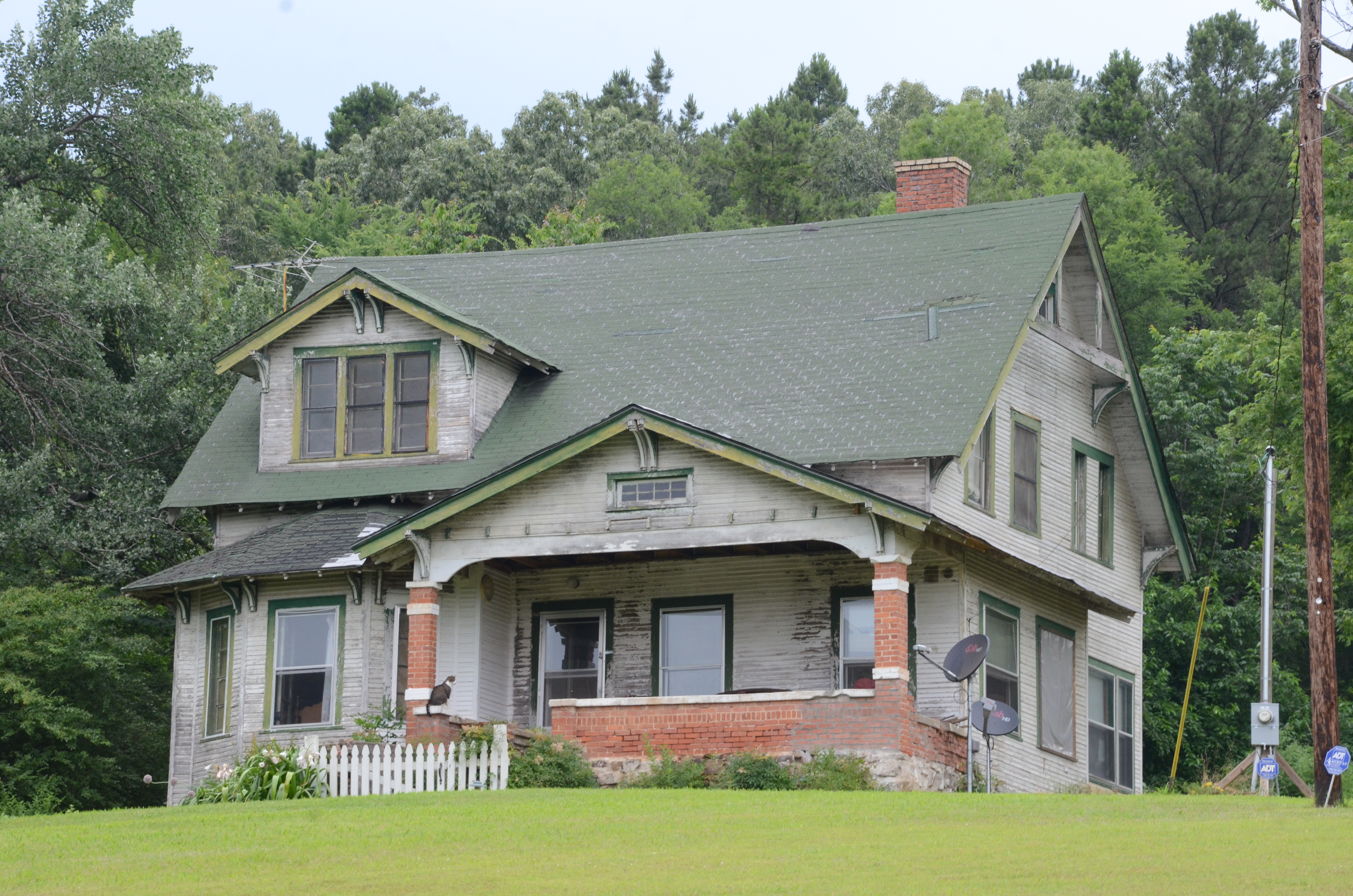

- Location within Arkansas Location within the United States
- Location: 4684 W. AR 60, Aplin, Arkansas
- Coordinates: 34°58′23″N 92°59′8″W
- Area: less than one acre
- Built: 1917
- Architectural style: Craftsman
- NRHP reference No.: 13000787
- Added to NRHP: September 30, 2013

The Camp House is a historic house at 4684 West Arkansas Highway 60 in Aplin, Arkansas. It is a 2 1/2-story wood-frame house, with a gabled roof, weatherboard siding, and a stone foundation. Its roof has deep eaves with applied decorative elements, and exposed rafter ends in the eaves. The front is adorned by a gable dormer, polygonal bay, and porch, all with bracketed gable roofs. The house was built about 1917 for James Camp, and is one of the small community's most distinctive examples of Craftsman architecture. It is also likely that the house was built from a kit Mr. Camp purchased from Sears, Roebuck.

The house was listed on the National Register of Historic Places in 2013.

== See also ==
- National Register of Historic Places listings in Perry County, Arkansas
