= C.L. Sailor House =

Historic house in Arkansas, United States

- U.S. National Register of Historic Places
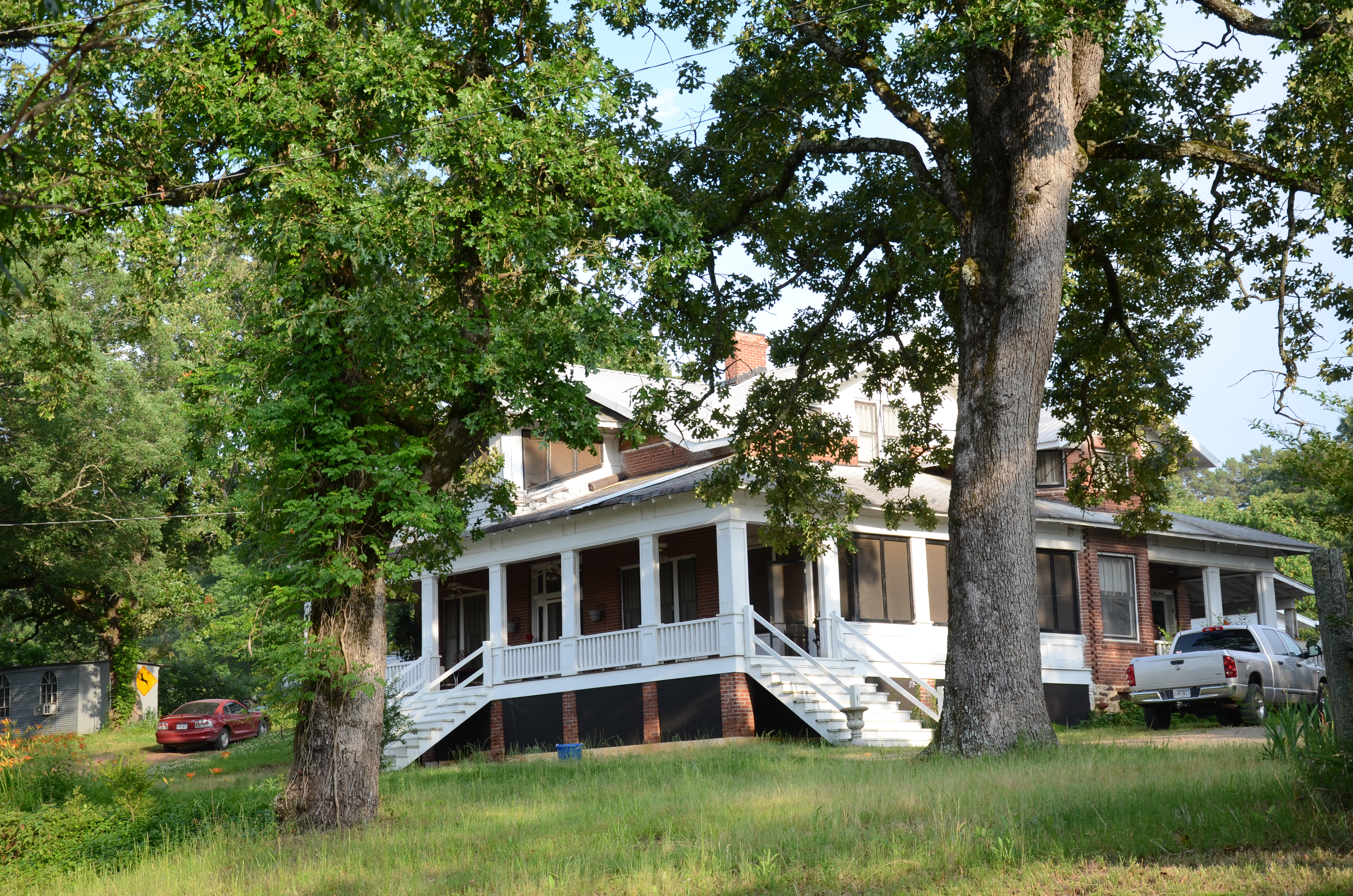

- Location within Arkansas Location within the United States
- Location: Wilson St., Bigelow, Arkansas
- Coordinates: 34°59′44″N 92°37′58″W
- Area: less than one acre
- Built: 1917
- Architectural style: Colonial Revival
- NRHP reference No.: 98000880
- Added to NRHP: July 23, 1998

The C.L. Sailor House is a historic house at Wilson and Wiley Streets in Bigelow, Arkansas. It is a 2 1/2-story wood-frame structure, its walls a combination of brick and composition shingles, set on a stone foundation. Its dominant feature is a wraparound porch, supported by paneled posts set on brick piers. Built in 1917, it is a distinctive blend of Colonial Revival and Craftsman styling. C.L. Sailor, for whom it was built, was general manager of the Bayou Fourche Lumber Company, and owned two area newspapers.

The house was listed on the National Register of Historic Places in 1998.

== See also ==
- National Register of Historic Places listings in Perry County, Arkansas
