= East End School District =

School district in Arkansas

Location
- 114 Panther Drive; Bigelow, Arkansas 72016 United States

District information
- Motto: Excellence in Education
- Grades: PK–12
- Established: 1912
- Superintendent: Lori Edgin
- Accreditation: Arkansas Department of Education
- Schools: 2
- NCES District ID: 0500068

Students and staff
- Students: 659
- Teachers: 54.45 (on FTE basis)
- Staff: 96.45 (on FTE basis)
- Student–teacher ratio: 12.10
- Athletic conference: 2A 5 (football); 2A 4 East (basketball)
- District mascot: Panther
- Colors: Black; White

Other information
- Website: www.eastendpanthers.com

East End School District (EESD) is a public school district based in Bigelow, Arkansas, United States. The school district supports more than 650 students in prekindergarten through grade 12 in the 2010–11 school year by employing more than 95 faculty and staff on a full time equivalent basis for its two schools.

The school district encompasses 101.57 square miles (263.1 km^{2}) of land, in Perry County and serves Bigelow, Houston, Fourche, Little Italy, and Wye Mountain. The district extends into a section of Pulaski County.

== Schools ==
- Bigelow High School, based in Bigelow and serving grades 7 through 12.
- Anne Watson Ełementary School, based in Bigelow and serving prekindergarten through grade 6.

Interscholastic activities at the junior varsity and varsity level are played at the 2A Classification level administered by the Arkansas Activities Association. The mascot for the junior/senior high school is the Panther.
