= Perryville Commercial Historic District =

Historic district in Arkansas, United States

- U.S. National Register of Historic Places
- U.S. Historic district
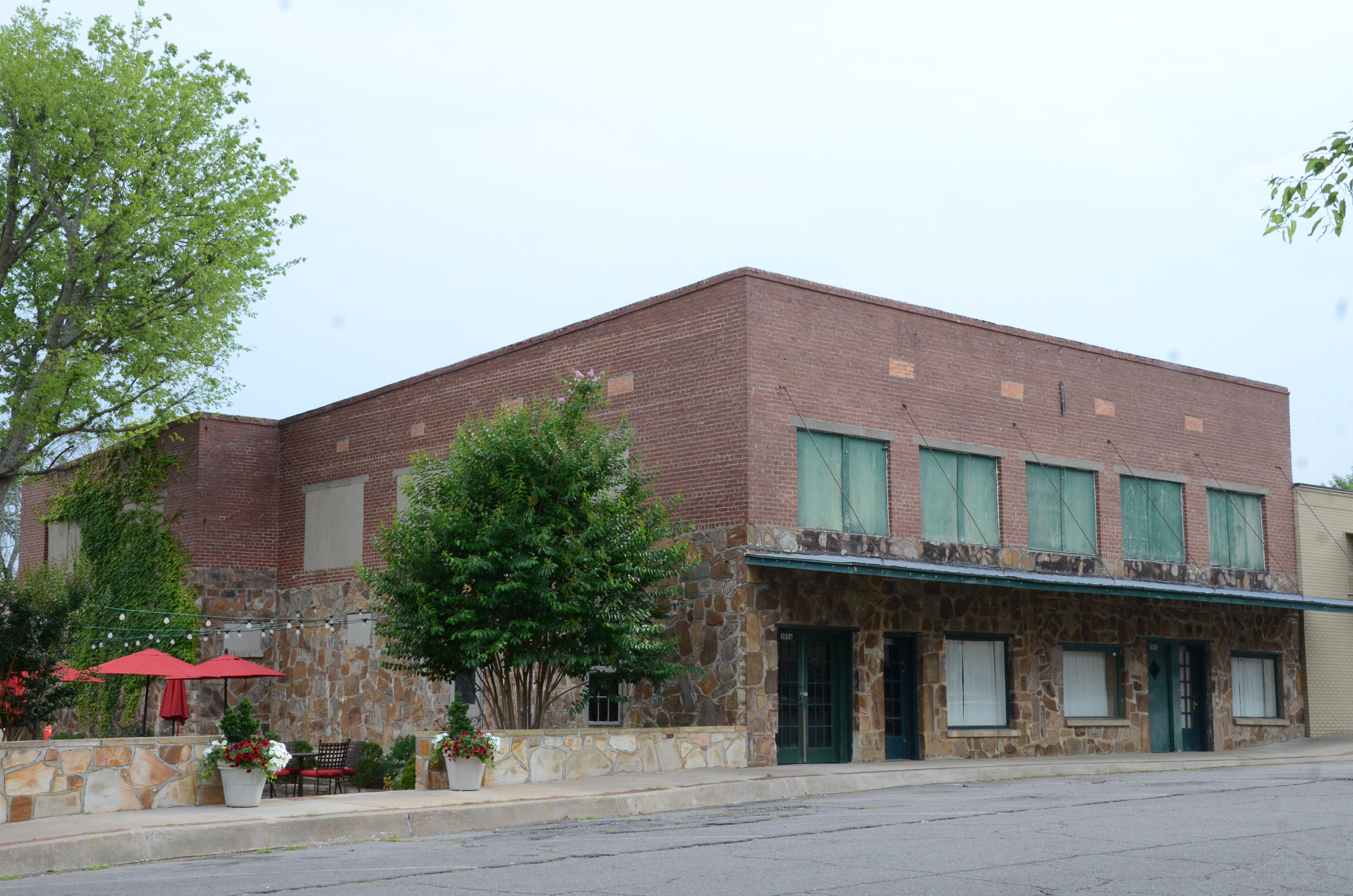

- Location within Arkansas Location within the United States
- Location: Roughly bounded by AR 10, Magnolia, Main & Plum Sts., Perryville, Arkansas
- Coordinates: 35°0′17″N 92°48′7″W
- Area: 8 acres (3.2 ha)
- Built: 1888
- NRHP reference No.: 11001048
- Added to NRHP: January 26, 2012

The Perryville Commercial Historic District encompasses the historic commercial and civic heart of the city of Perryville, Arkansas. It was listed on the National Register of Historic Places in 2012, and it includes two buildings already separately listed. It is centered on the courthouse square, where the 1880 Perry County Courthouse stands. It includes nine contributing buildings, including buildings facing the square, with a few included on adjacent side streets, and six non-contributing ones. This area was developed beginning in the 1840s, when Perryville was founded, and grew through the mid-20th century. Most of the buildings are vernacular commercial buildings, finished in wood, brick, or stone. The most unusual is the Rustic Perryville American Legion Building.

Architect Irven G. McDaniels appears to have been the architect who, in 1961, designed a second annex expanding the Perry County Courthouse. (Note: The NRHP document refers to a "Erwin McDaniels" which seems likely to mean one of the father-son architects named Irven McDaniel, and by the date it must have been the younger.)

The district was listed on the National Register of Historic Places in 2012.

== See also ==
- National Register of Historic Places listings in Perry County, Arkansas
