= Hawks Schoolhouse =

- U.S. National Register of Historic Places
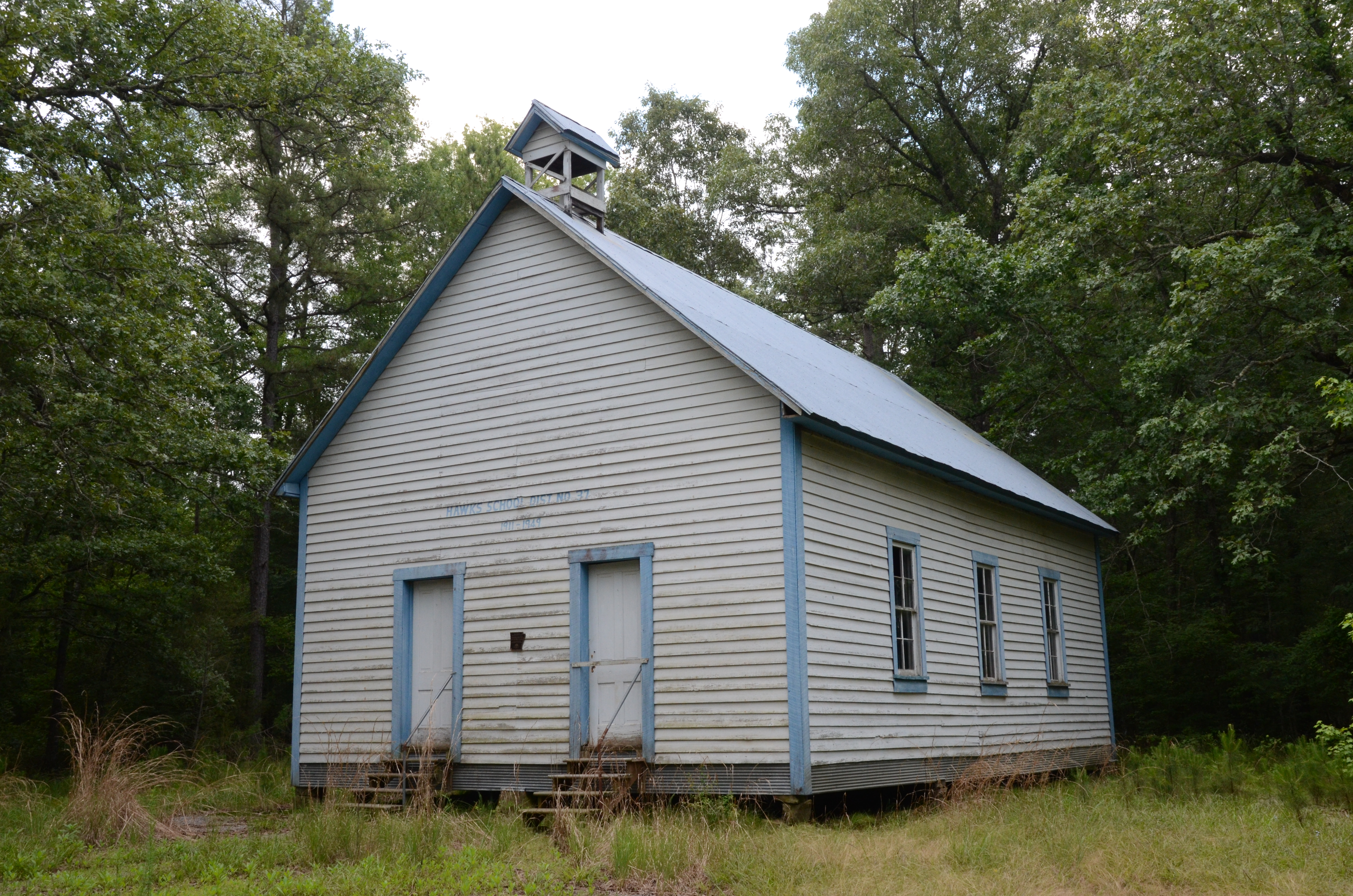

- Location within Arkansas Location within the United States
- Nearest city: Ava, Arkansas
- Coordinates: 34°52′6″N 93°12′30″W
- Area: less than one acre
- Built: 1911
- Built by: Charlie Ballew, Edd Storms, Sport Tom Jones
- Architectural style: Plain traditional
- NRHP reference No.: 01001528
- Added to NRHP: January 28, 2002

The Hawks Schoolhouse is a historic school building in rural western Perry County, Arkansas. It is located on the south side of County Road 7, in the easternmost section of Ouachita National Forest, near the hamlet of Ava. It is a single-story wood-frame structure, with a gabled roof and weatherboard siding. The roof is capped by a small gable-roofed open belfry. The front facade has a pair of symmetrically placed entrances with simple molding. It was built in 1911, and is a well-preserved example of a district schoolhouse in a rural context.

It was a "country school", a one-room schoolhouse.

The building was listed on the National Register of Historic Places in 2002.

== See also ==
- National Register of Historic Places listings in Perry County, Arkansas
