= Perry County Courthouse (Arkansas) =

- U.S. National Register of Historic Places
- U.S. Historic district – Contributing property
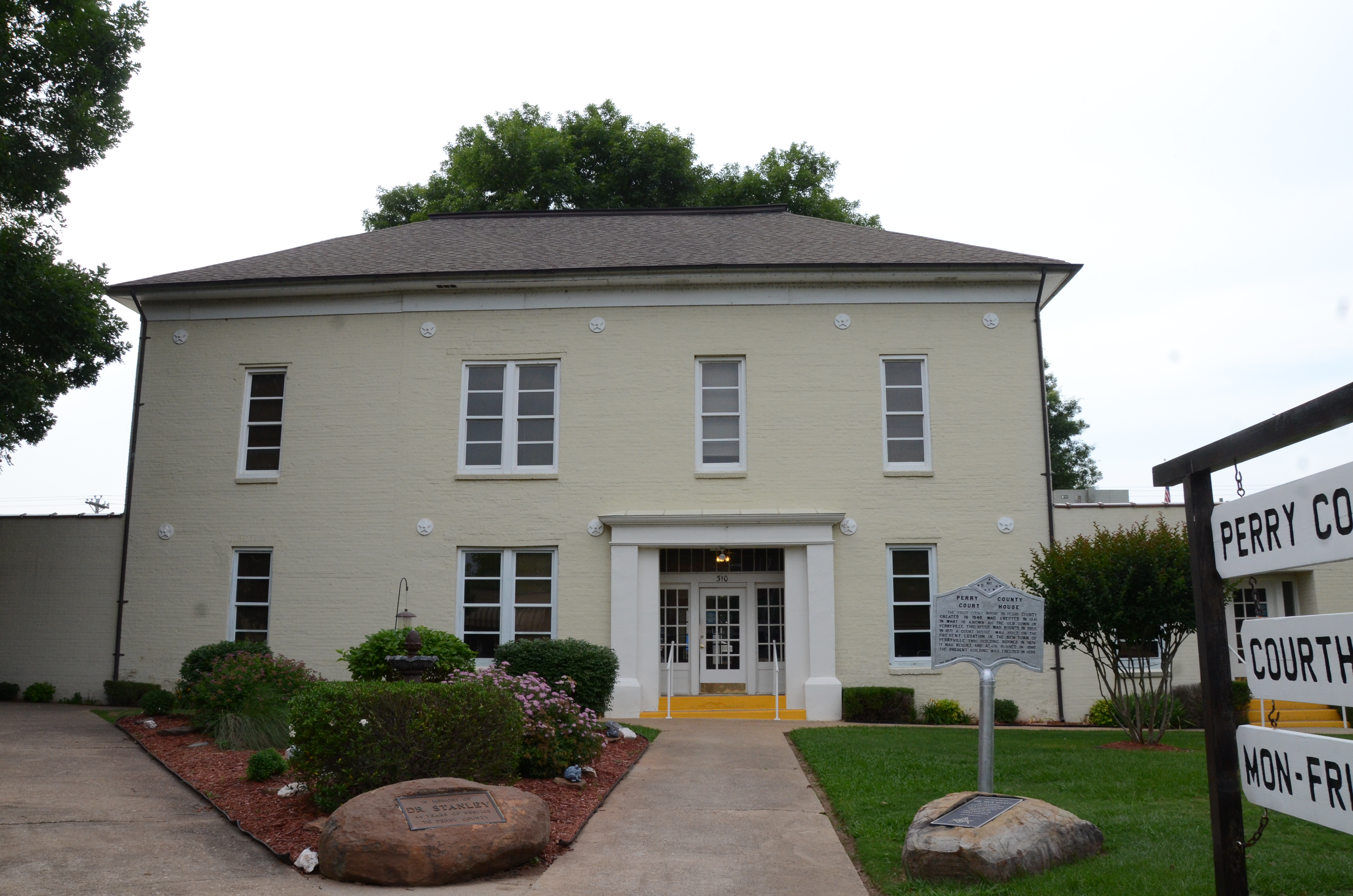

- Location within Arkansas Location within the United States
- Location: Main and Pine Sts., Perryville, Arkansas
- Coordinates: 35°0′19″N 92°48′7″W
- Built: 1888
- Part of: Perryville Commercial Historic District (ID11001048)
- NRHP reference No.: 76000443

Significant dates
- Added to NRHP: July 6, 1976
- Designated CP: January 26, 2012

The Perry County Courthouse is located at Main and Pine Streets in the commercial heart of Perryville, Arkansas, the seat of Perry County. It is a two-story brick building, with a hip roof. It is very simply styled, with rectangular two-over-two windows set in unadorned openings (some in pairs). Its main entrance is deeply recessed in an opening framed by pilasters and an entablatured, with multi-light sidelight windows to either side of the door. The courthouse was built in 1888, and was the county's third. It has been enlarged by single-story wings to either side.

The building was listed on the National Register of Historic Places in 1976.

== See also ==
- National Register of Historic Places listings in Perry County, Arkansas
