= Jack Tar Hotel and Bathhouse =

- U.S. National Register of Historic Places
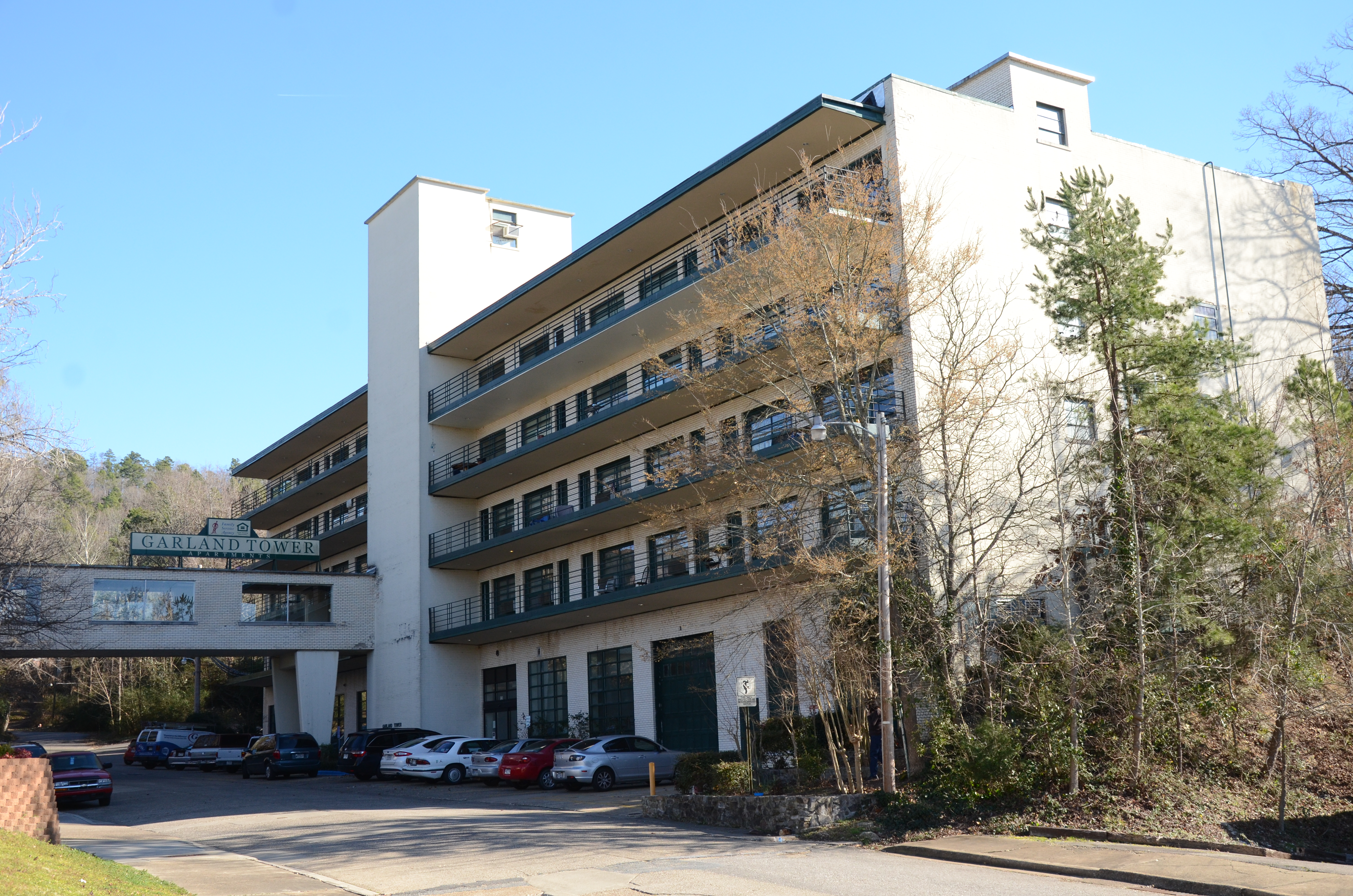

- Location within Arkansas Location within the United States
- Location: 145 Oriole St., Hot Springs, Arkansas
- Coordinates: 34°31′45.7″N 93°02′52.2″W
- Area: 2.5 acres (1.0 ha)
- Architect: Irven G. McDaniel
- Architectural style: International Style
- NRHP reference No.: 06000079
- Added to NRHP: February 21, 2006

The Jack Tar Hotel and Bathhouse is a historic former tourist resort property at 145 Oriole Street in Hot Springs, Arkansas.

It is a five-story steel and masonry structure, finished in buff brick, with International style. Its prominent features are a central rectangular stair house, which projects from the main facade and rises two stories above the main block. The front is lined with balconies which are cantilevered out on steel beams.

An elevated pedestrian bridge joins the main hotel to the bathhouse, across Oriole Street. The hotel was built in 1950 by Vance Bryan to a design by local architect Irven McDaniel, and is a rare surviving example of a 1950s hotel in Hot Springs. The building now houses a senior living facility known as the Garland Towers.

The property was listed on the National Register of Historic Places in 2006.

== See also ==
- National Register of Historic Places listings in Garland County, Arkansas
