= Camp Ouachita Girl Scout Camp Historic District =

Historic district in Arkansas, United States

- U.S. National Register of Historic Places
- U.S. Historic district
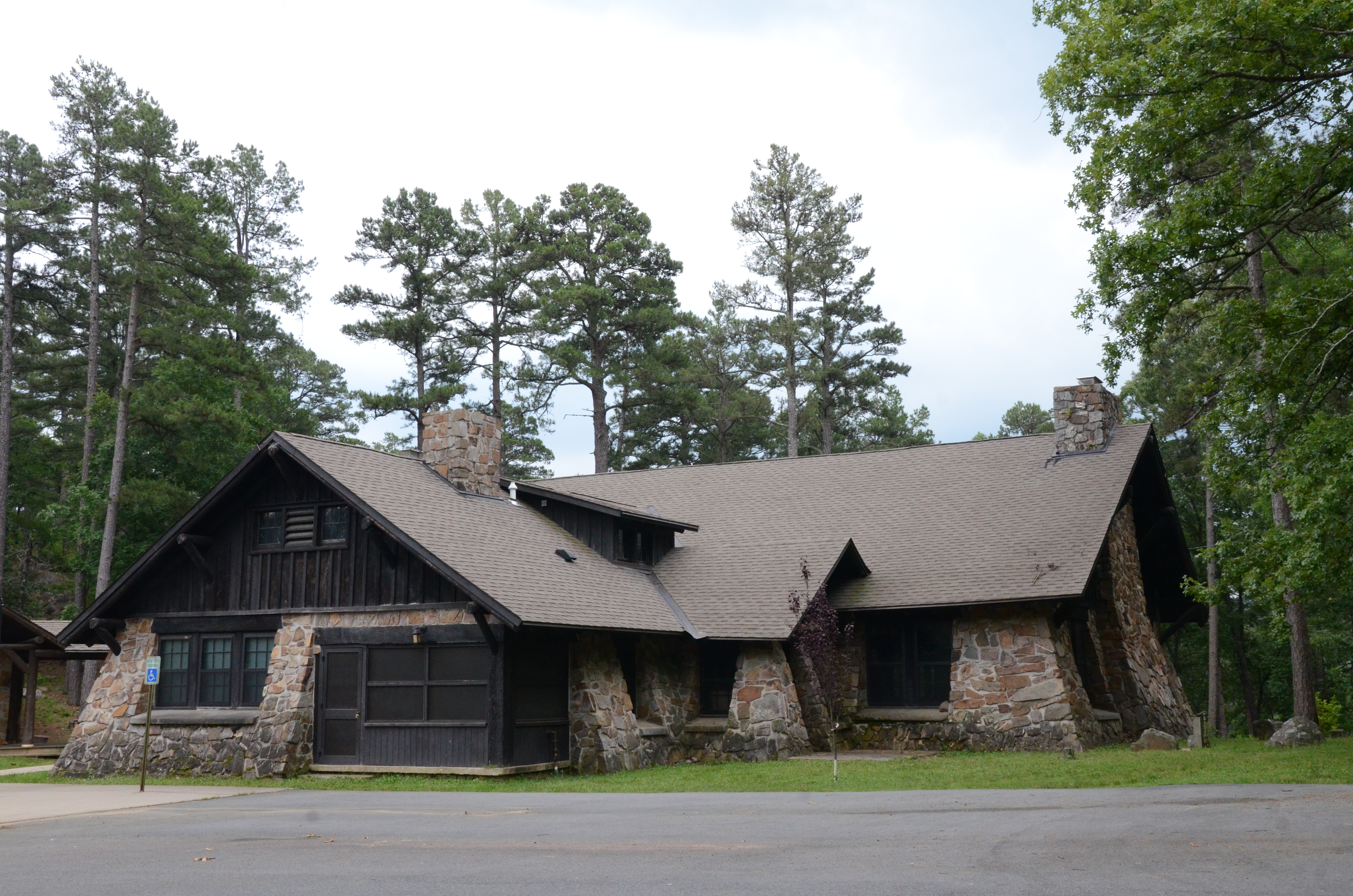

- Location within Arkansas Location within the United States
- Location: north shore of Lake Sylvia, Ouachita National Forest, Perry County, Arkansas
- Coordinates: 34°52′20″N 92°49′18″W
- Area: 60 acres (24 ha)
- Built by: Works Progress Administration
- Architect: Thompson, Sanders & Ginocchio
- Architectural style: Rustic
- MPS: Facilities Constructed by the CCC in Arkansas MPS
- NRHP reference No.: 90001826
- Added to NRHP: February 3, 1992

The Camp Ouachita Girl Scout Camp Historic District encompasses a campground area built by crews of the Civilian Conservation Corps in the 1930s on the northern shore of Lake Sylvia, a man-made lake in the eastern part of Ouachita National Forest. The center of the campground, including its Great Hall and administration buildings, is located at the northern tip of Lake Sylvia, with cabins, comfort facilities, and other infrastructure arrayed around the northern and western sides of the lake. It was the first Girl Scout camp in the state, and is a well-preserved example of the Rustic style of architecture for which the CCC is known.

Camp Ouachita was constructed by the Works Progress Administration (WPA), not the CCC according to the encyclopedia of arkansas.

The district was listed on the National Register of Historic Places in 1992.

== See also ==
- National Register of Historic Places listings in Perry County, Arkansas
