= Fourche, Arkansas =

- Town
- Location of Fourche in Perry County, Arkansas.
- Coordinates: 34°59′35″N 92°37′8″W
- Country: United States
- State: Arkansas
- County: Perry

Area
  - Total: 0.20 sq mi (0.52 km^{2})
  - Land: 0.20 sq mi (0.52 km^{2})
  - Water: 0 sq mi (0.00 km^{2})
- Elevation: 299 ft (91 m)

Population (2020)
  - Total: 56
  - Estimate (2025): 56
  - Density: 281.3/sq mi (108.61/km^{2})
- Time zone: UTC-6 (Central (CST))
  - Summer (DST): UTC-5 (CDT)
- FIPS code: 05-24760
- GNIS feature ID: 2406516

Fourche (/ˈfʊʃ/ FUUSH) is a town in Perry County, Arkansas, United States. As of the 2020 census, Fourche had a population of 56. It is part of the Little Rock–North Little Rock–Conway Metropolitan Statistical Area.

== Geography ==
Fourche is located at 34°59′35″N 92°37′8″W (34.993192, -92.618974).

According to the United States Census Bureau, the town has a total area of 0.5 km^{2} (0.19 sq mi), all land.

== Demographics ==
Historical population
Census	Pop.	Note	%±
1910	246		—
1920	164		−33.3%
1930	94		−42.7%
1940	88		−6.4%
1950	51		−42.0%
1960	48		−5.9%
1970	46		−4.2%
1980	51		10.9%
1990	55		7.8%
2000	59		7.3%
2010	62		5.1%
2020	56		−9.7%
2025 (est.)	56		0.0%
U.S. Decennial Census; 2014 Estimate

As of the census of 2000, there were 59 people, 23 households, and 16 families residing in the town. The population density was 119.9 people /km^{2} (311 people/mi^{2}). There were 25 housing units at an average density of 50.8 units /km^{2} (132 units/mi^{2}). The racial makeup of the town was 94.92% White and 5.08% Black or African American.

There were 23 households, out of which 52.2% had children under the age of 18 living with them, 60.9% were married couples living together, 8.7% had a female householder with no husband present, and 26.1% were non-families. 21.7% of all households were made up of individuals, and 8.7% had someone living alone who was 65 years of age or older. The average household size was 2.57 and the average family size was 3.06.

In the town, the population was spread out, with 33.9% under the age of 18, 10.2% from 18 to 24, 27.1% from 25 to 44, 16.9% from 45 to 64, and 11.9% who were 65 years of age or older. The median age was 33 years. For every 100 females, there were 96.7 males. For every 100 females age 18 and over, there were 105.3 males.

The median income for a household in the town was $30,417, and the median income for a family was $31,250. Males had a median income of $29,583 versus $22,500 for females. The per capita income for the town was $12,927. There were 5.9% of families and 9.1% of the population living below the poverty line, including 18.2% of under eighteens and none of those over 64.

== Education ==
Public education for elementary and secondary school students is primarily provided by the East End School District, which leads to graduation from Bigelow High School.
