= Onyx, Arkansas =

- Unincorporated community
- Onyx's position in Arkansas. Onyx, Arkansas (the United States)
- Coordinates: 34°51′5.3″N 93°24′28.7″W
- Country: United States
- State: Arkansas
- County: Yell
- Township: Crawford
- Elevation: 735 ft (224 m)
- Time zone: UTC-6 (Central (CST))
  - Summer (DST): UTC-5 (CDT)
- Area code: 479
- GNIS feature ID: 72854

Onyx is an unincorporated community in southern Yell County, Arkansas, United States. It is located at the intersection of Arkansas highways 314 and 27. The South Fourche La Fave River flows past south of the community.

It was named for deposits of onyx in the vicinity.
