= Bigelow High School =

Location
- 101 East Panther Drive; Bigelow, Arkansas 72016; United States; 34°59′52″N 92°37′58″W

Information
- School type: Public comprehensive
- Status: Open
- School district: East End School District
- CEEB code: 040190
- NCES School ID: 050558000268
- Teaching staff: 28.63 (on FTE basis)
- Grades: 7–12
- Enrollment: 322 (2010–11)
- Student to teacher ratio: 11.25
- Education system: ADE Smart Core
- Classes offered: Regular, Advanced Placement (AP)
- Colors: Black and white
- Athletics conference: 2A Region 5
- Mascot: Panther
- Team name: Bigelow Panthers
- Accreditation: ADE
- Website: www.eastendpanthers.com/page/bhs

Bigelow High School is a comprehensive public high school located in Bigelow, Arkansas, United States. The school provides secondary education for students in grades 7 through 12. It is one of two public high schools in Perry County; the other is Perryville High School. It is the sole high school administered by the East End School District.

The boundary of the East End district, and therefore that of the high school, includes Bigelow, Fourche, and Houston.

== History ==
Bigelow High administrators made national news when they tore a two-page spread out of the 2021 student yearbook that contained a timeline of events of the past year, including Black Lives Matter and the murder of George Floyd by a police officer. Administrators cited fears of a "community backlash" while detractors charged censorship.

== Academics ==
Bigelow High School is accredited by the Arkansas Department of Education (ADE). The assumed course of study follows the ADE Smart Core curriculum, which requires students complete at least 22 units prior to graduation. Students complete regular coursework and exams and may take Advanced Placement (AP) courses and exam with the opportunity to receive college credit.

== Athletics ==
The Bigelow High School mascot and athletic emblem is the Panther with black and white serving as the school colors.

For 2012–14, the Bigelow Panthers participate in interscholastic activities within the 2A Classification via the 2A Region 5 (Football) Conference and 2A Region 4 East (Basketball) Conference, as administered by the Arkansas Activities Association. The Panthers compete in football, cross country (boys/girls), golf (boys/girls), basketball (boys/girls), baseball, softball, track and field (boys/girls), and cheer. The Panthers won their first state championship in football in 2023.
