= Bigelow Methodist Episcopal Church, South =

Historic church in Arkansas, United States

- U.S. National Register of Historic Places
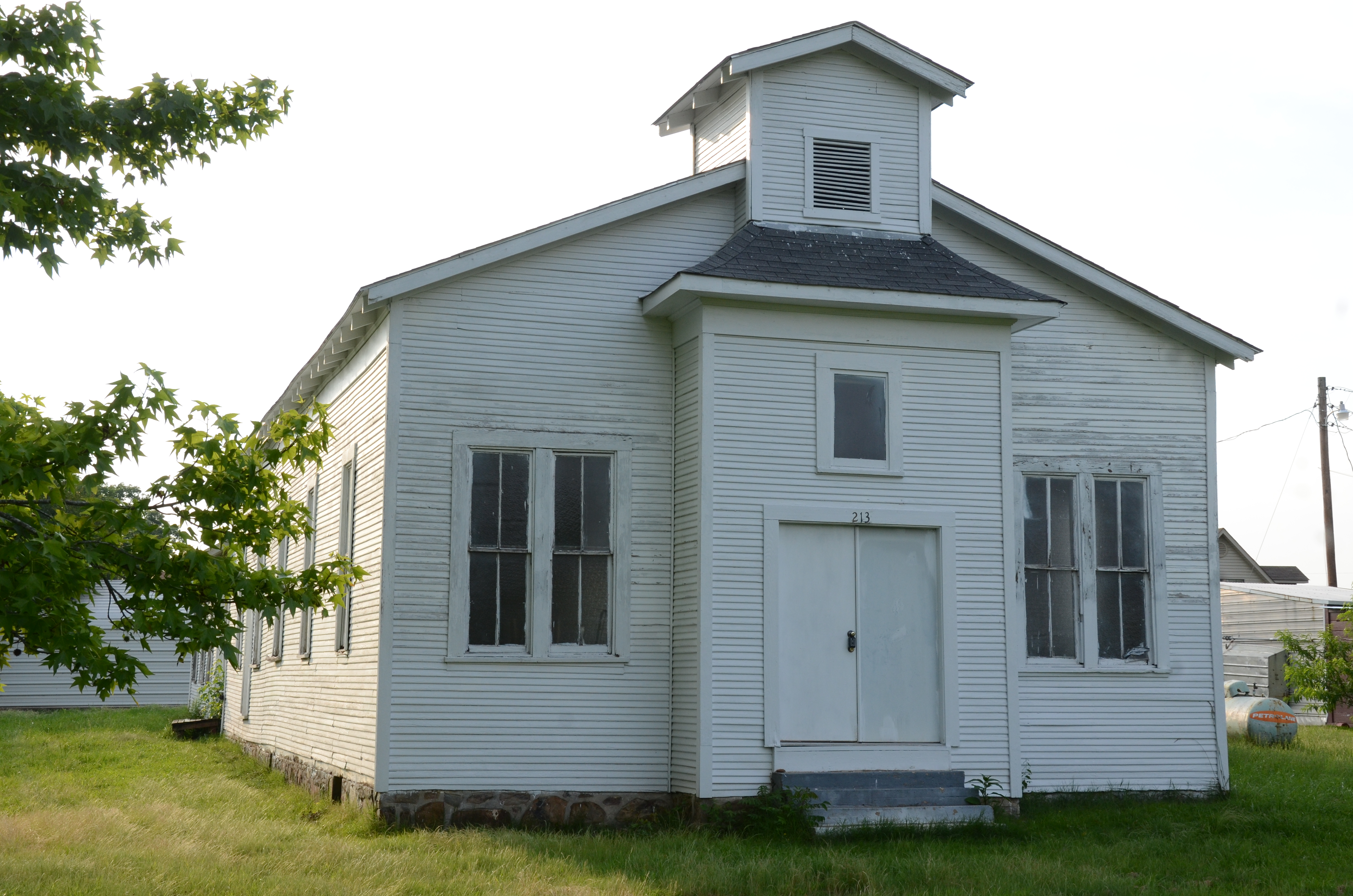

- Location within Arkansas Location within the United States
- Location: W of Jct. of Volman and Emma Sts., Bigelow, Arkansas
- Coordinates: 34°59′57″N 92°37′49″W
- Area: less than one acre
- Built: 1908
- Architectural style: Plain Traditional
- NRHP reference No.: 96000353
- Added to NRHP: April 4, 1996

Bigelow Methodist Episcopal Church, South is a historic church west of the junction of Volman and Emma Streets in Bigelow, Arkansas. It is a single-story wood-frame structure with a gabled roof and weatherboard siding. It has a slightly project entry vestibule, with a double-door entry topped by a single-pane square window. Above this a flared roof section transitions to a square tower, which straddles across the end of the main roof and is topped by a gabled roof. The eaves of all roofs show exposed rafter ends in the Craftsman style. It was built about 1908, at a time when the small town was undergoing a boom due to the lumber industry. The church is one of the few surviving buildings from that period.

The building was listed on the National Register of Historic Places in 1996.

== See also ==
- National Register of Historic Places listings in Perry County, Arkansas
