= Perry Plaza Court Historic District =

Historic district in Arkansas, United States

- U.S. National Register of Historic Places
- U.S. Historic district
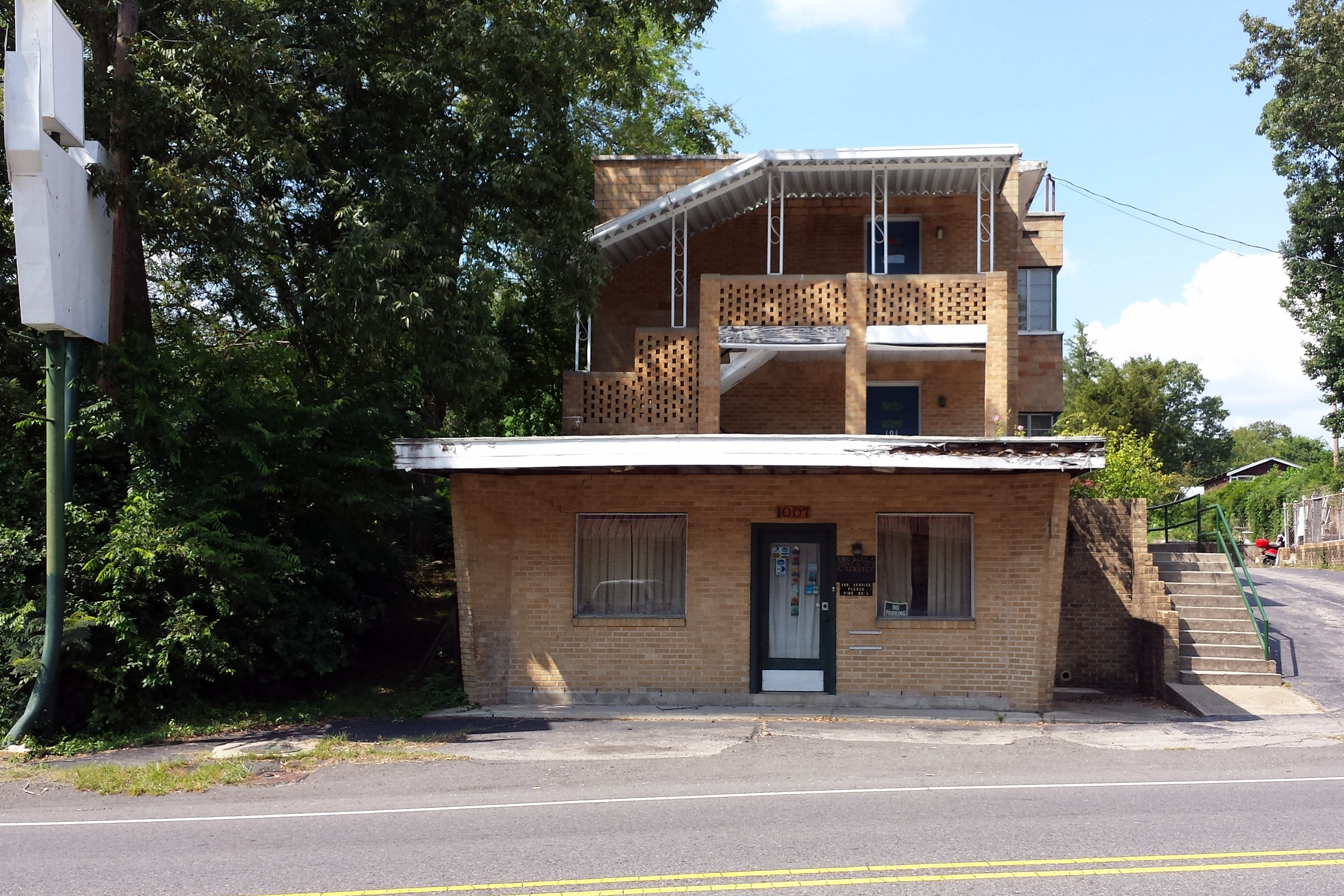

- Location within Arkansas Location within the United States
- Location: 1007 Park Ave., Hot Springs, Arkansas
- Coordinates: 34°31′50″N 93°2′43″W
- Area: less than one acre
- Built: 1947
- Architect: Irven D. McDaniel
- Architectural style: International Style
- MPS: Arkansas Highway History and Architecture MPS
- NRHP reference No.: 04000012
- Added to NRHP: February 11, 2004

The Perry Plaza Court Historic District encompasses a historic tourist accommodation at 1007 Park Avenue in Hot Springs, Arkansas. It consists of a long two-story brick building in the International style, along with a small office building and swimming pool. It houses 19 single-bedroom units, which are now rented as apartments. Built in 1947–48, it is a fine example of the International Style. The unit interiors retain a number of period features, including tile and plumbing fixtures.

The property was listed on the National Register of Historic Places in 2004.

It was designed by Hot Springs architect Irven D. McDaniel.

== See also ==
- National Register of Historic Places listings in Garland County, Arkansas
