= Adona, Arkansas =

- City
- Location of Adona in Perry County, Arkansas.
- Coordinates: 35°2′22″N 92°53′56″W
- Country: United States
- State: Arkansas
- County: Perry

Area
  - Total: 0.95 sq mi (2.46 km^{2})
  - Land: 0.95 sq mi (2.46 km^{2})
  - Water: 0 sq mi (0.00 km^{2})
- Elevation: 371 ft (113 m)

Population (2020)
  - Total: 149
  - Estimate (2025): 147 ▼
  - Density: 157.0/sq mi (60.61/km^{2})
- Time zone: UTC-6 (Central (CST))
  - Summer (DST): UTC-5 (CDT)
- ZIP code: 72001
- Area code: 501
- FIPS code: 05-00250
- GNIS feature ID: 2403065

Adona is a city in Perry County, Arkansas, United States. The population was 149 at the 2020 census.

== Geography ==
According to the United States Census Bureau, the town has a total area of 2.4 km^{2} (0.9 mi^{2}), all land.

== Demographics ==
Historical population
Census	Pop.	Note	%±
1920	241		—
1930	200		−17.0%
1940	218		9.0%
1950	194		−11.0%
1960	154		−20.6%
1970	204		32.5%
1980	230		12.7%
1990	146		−36.5%
2000	187		28.1%
2010	209		11.8%
2020	149		−28.7%
2025 (est.)	147	▼	−1.3%
U.S. Decennial Census

Adona is part of the Little Rock–North Little Rock–Conway Metropolitan Statistical Area.

=== 2000 census ===
At the 2000 census, there were 187 people, 76 households and 58 families residing in the town. The population density was 76.8/km^{2} (198.1/mi^{2}). There were 82 housing units at an average density of 33.7/km^{2} (86.9/mi^{2}). The racial makeup of the town was 94.12% White, 3.21% Black or African American, 2.14% Native American, and 0.53% from two or more races.

There were 76 households, of which 32.9% had children under the age of 18 living with them, 59.2% were married couples living together, 15.8% had a female householder with no husband present, and 22.4% were non-families. 19.7% of all households were made up of individuals, and 10.5% had someone living alone who was 65 years of age or older. The average household size was 2.46 and the average family size was 2.81.

Age distribution was 24.6% under the age of 18, 5.3% from 18 to 24, 30.5% from 25 to 44, 18.2% from 45 to 64, and 21.4% who were 65 years of age or older. The median age was 37 years. For every 100 females, there were 92.8 males. For every 100 females age 18 and over, there were 93.2 males.

The median household income was $34,375, and the median family income was $38,333. Males had a median income of $29,583 versus $20,000 for females. The per capita income for the town was $30,247. About 11.1% of families and 9.9% of the population were below the poverty line, including 10.0% of those under the age of eighteen and 7.7% of those 65 or over.

== Education ==
Early childhood, elementary and secondary school students primarily attend Perryville School District, which leads to graduation from Perryville High School.
