= Perryville School District =

School district in Arkansas, United States

Address
- 614 South Fourche Avenue PERRYVILLE, Arkansas, 72126; United States

District information
- Type: Public
- Grades: K–12
- NCES District ID: 0511340

Students and staff
- Students: 884
- Teachers: 95.75
- Staff: 72.86
- Student–teacher ratio: 9.23

Other information
- Website: www.perryvilleschool.org

Perryville School District 7 is a public school district based in Perryville, Arkansas.

The school district supports more than 1,000 students and employs more than 150 faculty and staff. The district encompasses 395.82 square miles (1,025.2 km^{2}) of land, in Perry County and Conway County.

Within Perry County it includes Perryville, Adona, and Aplin. Some students from Paron, within the Bryant School District in Saline County, instead attend Perryville schools.

== Schools ==
- Perryville High School, serving grades 7 through 12.
- Perryville Elementary School, serving kindergarten through grade 6.
