= Billings-Cole House =

Historic house in Arkansas, United States

- U.S. National Register of Historic Places
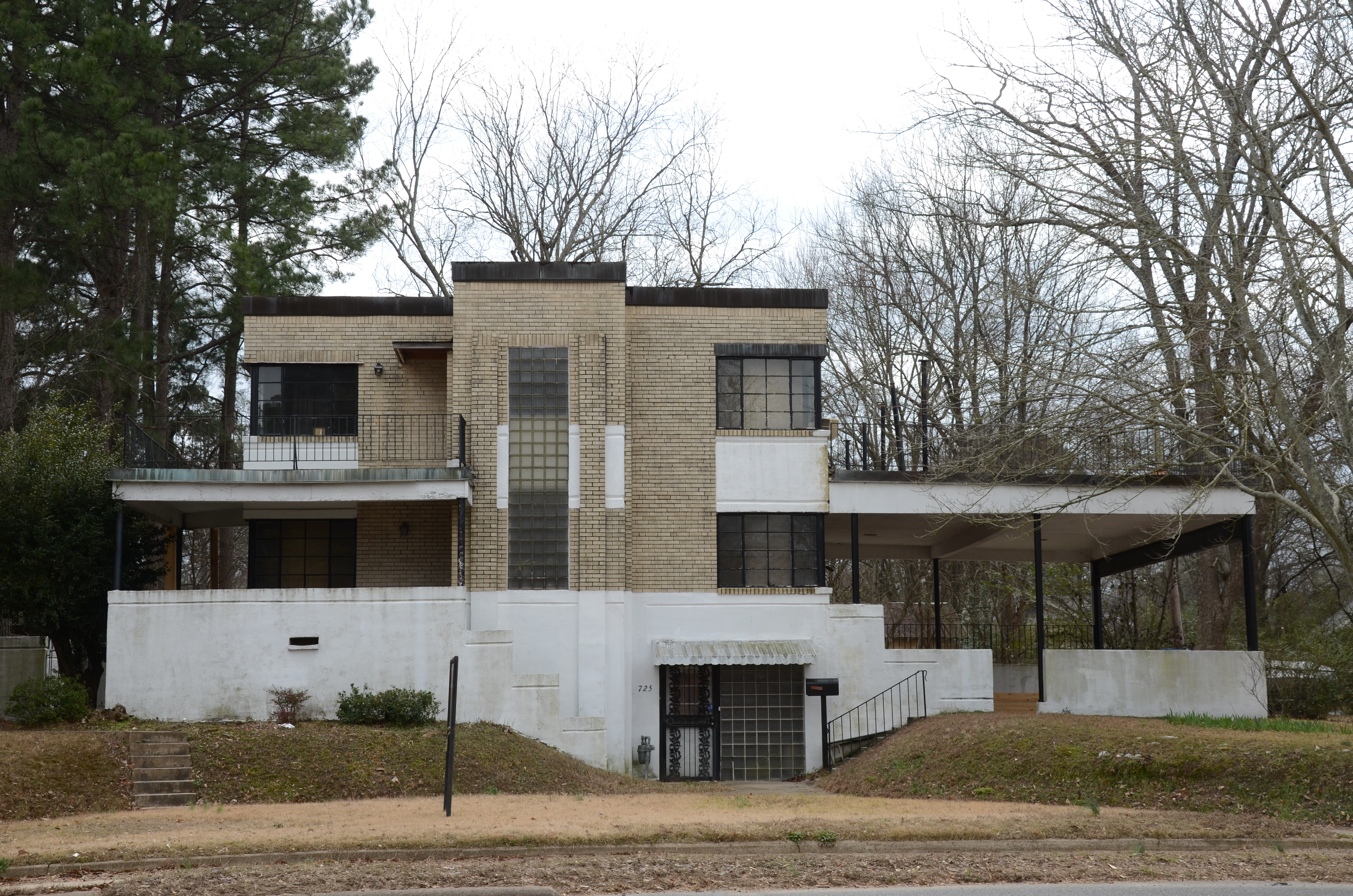

- Location within Arkansas Location within the United States
- Location: 725 E. Page Ave., Malvern, Arkansas
- Coordinates: 34°21′48″N 92°48′12″W
- Area: less than one acre
- Built: 1948, 1952
- Architect: Irven D. McDaniel
- Architectural style: Art Moderne, International
- NRHP reference No.: 15000283
- Added to NRHP: May 27, 2015

The Billings-Cole House is a historic house at 725 East Page Avenue in Malvern, Arkansas. It is a roughly cubical two story structure, set on a sloping lot with a partially exposed basement. A flat-roof porch wraps around its northeast corner, and a flat-roof carport extends to its west. A porch and patio extend on top of the carport. The house was designed in 1948 by Irven Donald McDaniel, a local architect, for Dr. A. A. Billings, and is a distinctive transitional work between the Art Moderne and International styles. The carport was added in 1952, and its basement redesigned by McDaniel for Dr. John W. Cole for use as a doctor's office.

The house was listed on the National Register of Historic Places in 2015.

== See also ==
- National Register of Historic Places listings in Hot Spring County, Arkansas
