= Hollis, Arkansas =

- Unincorporated community
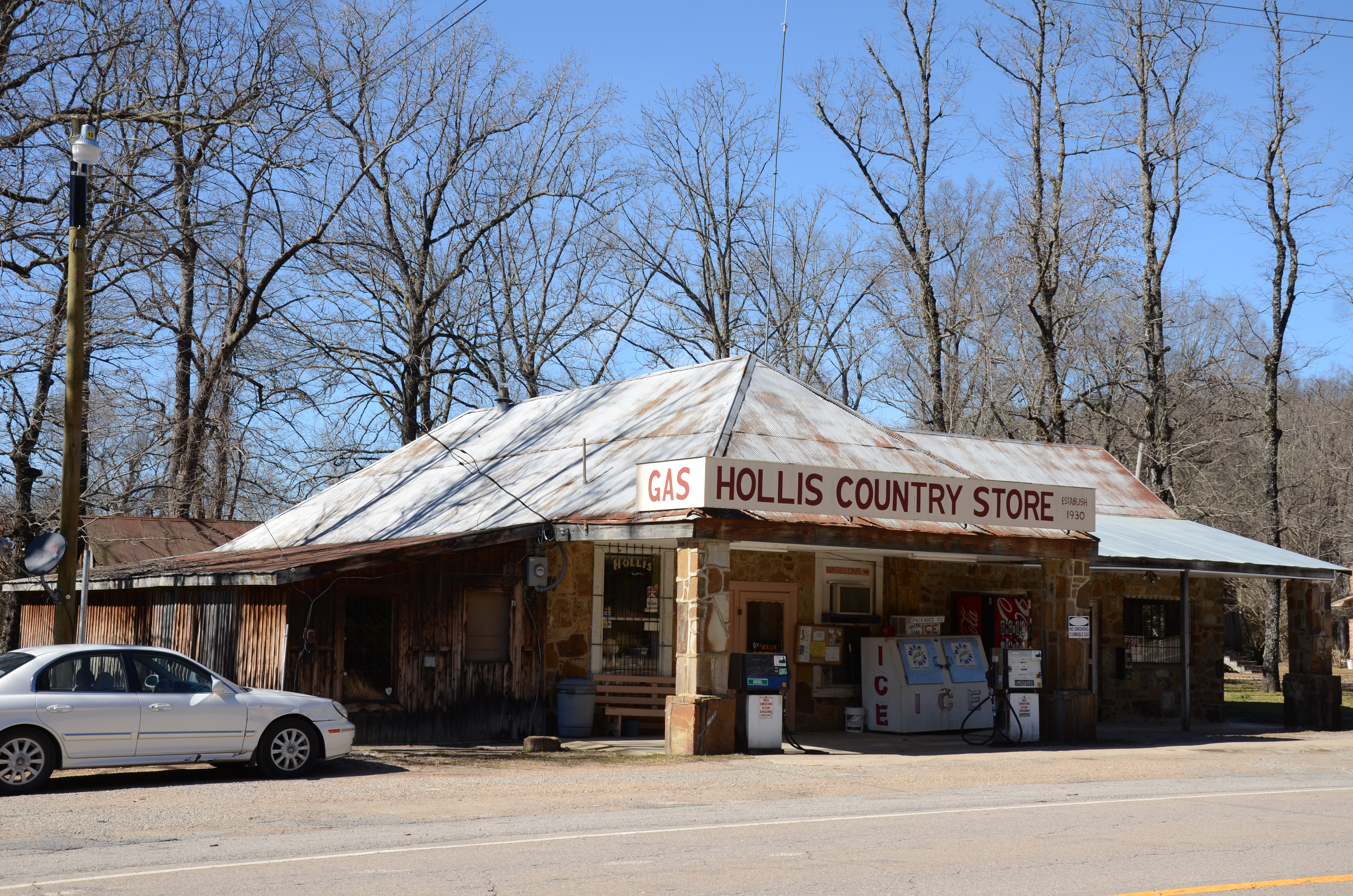
- The Hollis Country Store

- Location within Arkansas Location within the United States
- Coordinates: 34°52′28″N 93°06′38″W
- Country: United States
- State: Arkansas
- County: Perry
- Elevation: 495 ft (151 m)
- Time zone: UTC-6 (Central (CST))
  - Summer (DST): UTC-5 (CDT)
- Area code: 501
- GNIS feature ID: 72045

Hollis is an unincorporated community in Perry County, Arkansas, United States. The community is located at the junction of Arkansas Highway 7 and Arkansas Highway 314, 20 miles (32 km) west-southwest of Perryville.

The Hollis Country Store and the South Fourche LaFave River Bridge, which are listed on the National Register of Historic Places, are in the community.
