= Perryville High School (Arkansas) =

Location
- 325 Houston Avenue; Perryville, Arkansas 72126; United States; 35°0′32″N 92°47′41″W

Information
- School type: Public comprehensive
- Status: Open
- School district: Perryville School District
- CEEB code: 042000
- NCES School ID: 05134000850
- Teaching staff: 56.84 (on FTE basis)
- Grades: 7–12
- Enrollment: 436 (2023–2024)
- Student to teacher ratio: 7.67
- Education system: ADE Smart Core
- Classes offered: Regular, Advanced Placement (AP)
- Colors: Gray and maroon
- Athletics conference: 3A Region 5
- Mascot: Mustang
- Team name: Perryville Mustangs
- Accreditation: ADE
- Website: www.perryvilleschool.org/page/contact-information-2

Perryville High School is a comprehensive public high school located in the fringe town of Perryville, Arkansas, United States. The school provides secondary education for students in grades 7 through 12. It is one of two public high schools in Perry County; the other is Bigelow High School. It is the sole high school administered by the Perryville School District.

Perryville School District's boundary, and therefore that of the high school, includes Perryville, Adona, and Aplin.

== Academics ==
Perryville High School is accredited by the Arkansas Department of Education (ADE). The assumed course of study follows the ADE Smart Core curriculum, which requires students complete at least 23 units prior to graduation. Students complete regular coursework and exams and may take Advanced Placement (AP) courses and exam with the opportunity to receive college credit.

== Athletics ==
The Perryville High School mascot and athletic emblem is the Mustang with maroon and gray serving as the school colors.

For 2012–14, the Perryville Mustangs participate in interscholastic activities within the 3A Classification via the 3A Region 5 Conference, as administered by the Arkansas Activities Association. The Mustangs compete in football, volleyball, golf (boys/girls), basketball (boys/girls), baseball, softball, track and field (boys/girls), and cheer.
