= South Fourche LaFave River Bridge =

- Formerly listed on the U.S. National Register of Historic Places
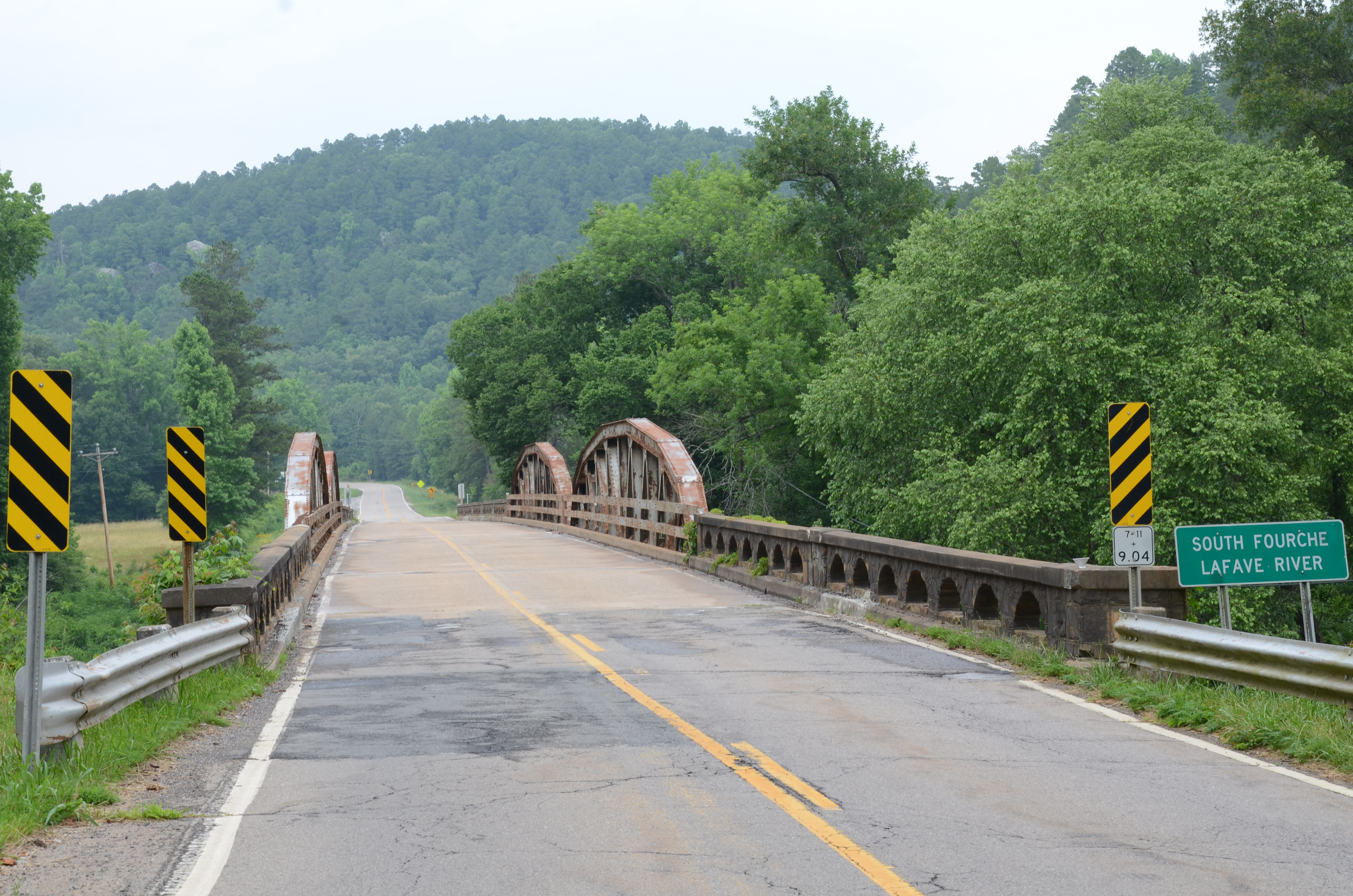

- Location within Arkansas Location within the United States
- Nearest city: Hollis, Arkansas
- Coordinates: 34°52′22″N 93°6′38″W
- Area: less than one acre
- Built: 1933
- Architectural style: Parker pony-truss
- MPS: Historic Bridges of Arkansas MPS
- NRHP reference No.: 04001044

Significant dates
- Added to NRHP: September 24, 2004
- Removed from NRHP: January 8, 2025

The South Fourche LaFave River Bridge was a historic bridge in rural western Perry County, Arkansas. It was a two-span Parker pony truss bridge, carrying Arkansas Highway 7 across the South Fourche La Fave River, roughly midway between Ola and Jessieville in the eastern reaches of Ouachita National Forest. The bridge was built in 1933, and had a total length of 485 feet (148 m), each of its main spans measuring 102 feet (31 m).

The bridge was listed on the National Register of Historic Places in 2004.

== See also ==
- National Register of Historic Places listings in Perry County, Arkansas
- List of bridges on the National Register of Historic Places in Arkansas
