= Van Lyell House =

Historic house in Arkansas, United States

- U.S. National Register of Historic Places
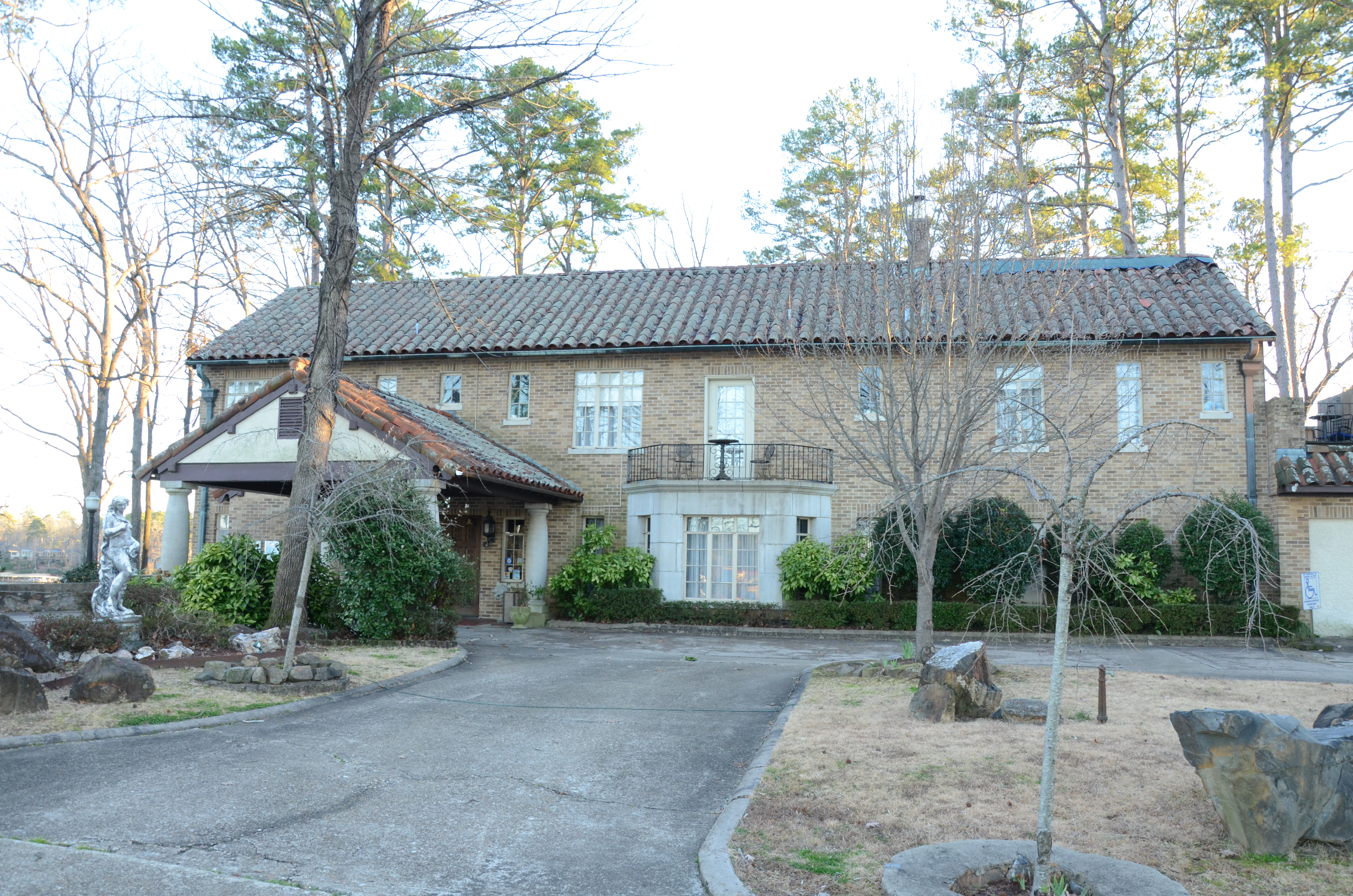

- Location within Arkansas Location within the United States
- Location: 130 Van Lyell Terrace, Hot Springs, Arkansas
- Coordinates: 34°26′18″N 93°5′5″W
- Area: 2.7 acres (1.1 ha)
- Built: 1931
- Architect: McDaniel, Granger
- Architectural style: Mission/spanish Revival
- NRHP reference No.: 04000504
- Added to NRHP: August 31, 2004

The Van Lyell House, now the centerpiece of the Hamilton House Estate bed and breakfast, is a historic house at 130 Van Lyell Terrace in Hot Springs, Arkansas. It is a two-story buff brick structure, built with Mediterranean styling. It was built in 1931, at about the same time that Carpenter Dam was under construction, impounding Lake Hamilton on whose shores it stands. It was built by Van Lyell, owner of the Hot Springs Coca-Cola franchise.

The house was listed on the National Register of Historic Places in 2004.

== See also ==
- National Register of Historic Places listings in Garland County, Arkansas
