= Aplin, Arkansas =

- Census-designated place
- Location within Arkansas Location within the United States
- Coordinates: 34°58′26″N 92°58′44″W
- Country: United States
- State: Arkansas
- County: Perry
- Elevation: 305 ft (93 m)

Population (2020)
  - Total: 100
- Time zone: UTC-6 (Central (CST))
  - Summer (DST): UTC-5 (CDT)
- Area code: 501
- GNIS feature ID: 2805617

Aplin is an unincorporated community and census-designated place (CDP) in Perry County, Arkansas, United States. It was first listed as a CDP in the 2020 census with a population of 100. The community is located along Arkansas Highway 60, 10.3 miles (16.6 km) west-southwest of Perryville.

== Demographics ==
Historical population
Census	Pop.	Note	%±
2020	100		—
U.S. Decennial Census; 2020

=== 2020 census ===
Aplin CDP, Arkansas – Racial and ethnic composition Note: the US Census treats Hispanic/Latino as an ethnic category. This table excludes Latinos from the racial categories and assigns them to a separate category. Hispanics/Latinos may be of any race.
Race / Ethnicity (NH = Non-Hispanic)	Pop 2020	% 2020
White alone (NH)	98	98.00%
Black or African American alone (NH)	0	0.00%
Native American or Alaska Native alone (NH)	0	0.00%
Asian alone (NH)	0	0.00%
Pacific Islander alone (NH)	0	0.00%
Some Other Race alone (NH)	0	0.00%
Mixed Race or Multi-Racial (NH)	2	2.00%
Hispanic or Latino (any race)	0	0.00%
Total	100	100.00%

== Education ==
Aplin is in the Perryville School District. Perryville High School is its zoned comprehensive high school.
