= Arkansas Highway 314 =

State highway in Arkansas, United States

Highway 314

Route information
- Maintained by AHTD
- Length: 17.45 mi (28.08 km)
- Existed: 1964–present

Major junctions
- West end: AR 27 at Onyx
- East end: AR 7 at Hollis

Location
- Country: United States
- State: Arkansas
- Counties: Perry, Yell

Highway system
- Arkansas Highway System; Interstate; US; State; Business; Spurs; Suffixed; Scenic; Heritage
← AR 313	→ AR 315

Arkansas Highway 314 (AR 314 and Hwy. 314) is an east–west state highway in Perry and Yell Counties. The route runs 17.45 miles (28.08 km) as a connector between Arkansas Highway 27 and Arkansas Highway 7 in the Ouachita National Forest. The route does not intersect any other state highways.

== Route description ==
Arkansas Highway 314 begins at Arkansas Highway 27 at Onyx, an unincorporated community within the Ouachita National Forest. The route runs east into Perry County to terminate at AR 7 at Hollis near the South Fourche Campground.

The road is a winding, two–lane road surrounded by trees for its entire length. AR 314 follows the South Fork of the Fourche River. There is a county road which breaks from AR 314 and leads to Shed Cemetery.

== History ==
The forest road has existed since Arkansas' earliest records, but the route didn't become a state highway until 1964. The first portion of the route was paved in 1973, but the entire route wasn't complete until 1976.

== Major intersections ==
County	Location	mi	km	Destinations	Notes
Yell	Onyx	0.0	0.0	AR 27 – Rover, Mount Ida	Western terminus
Perry	Hollis	17.45	28.08	AR 7 – Russellville, Hot Springs	Eastern terminus
1.000 mi = 1.609 km; 1.000 km = 0.621 mi

== See also ==
- List of state highways in Arkansas
