= Perryville, Arkansas =

- City
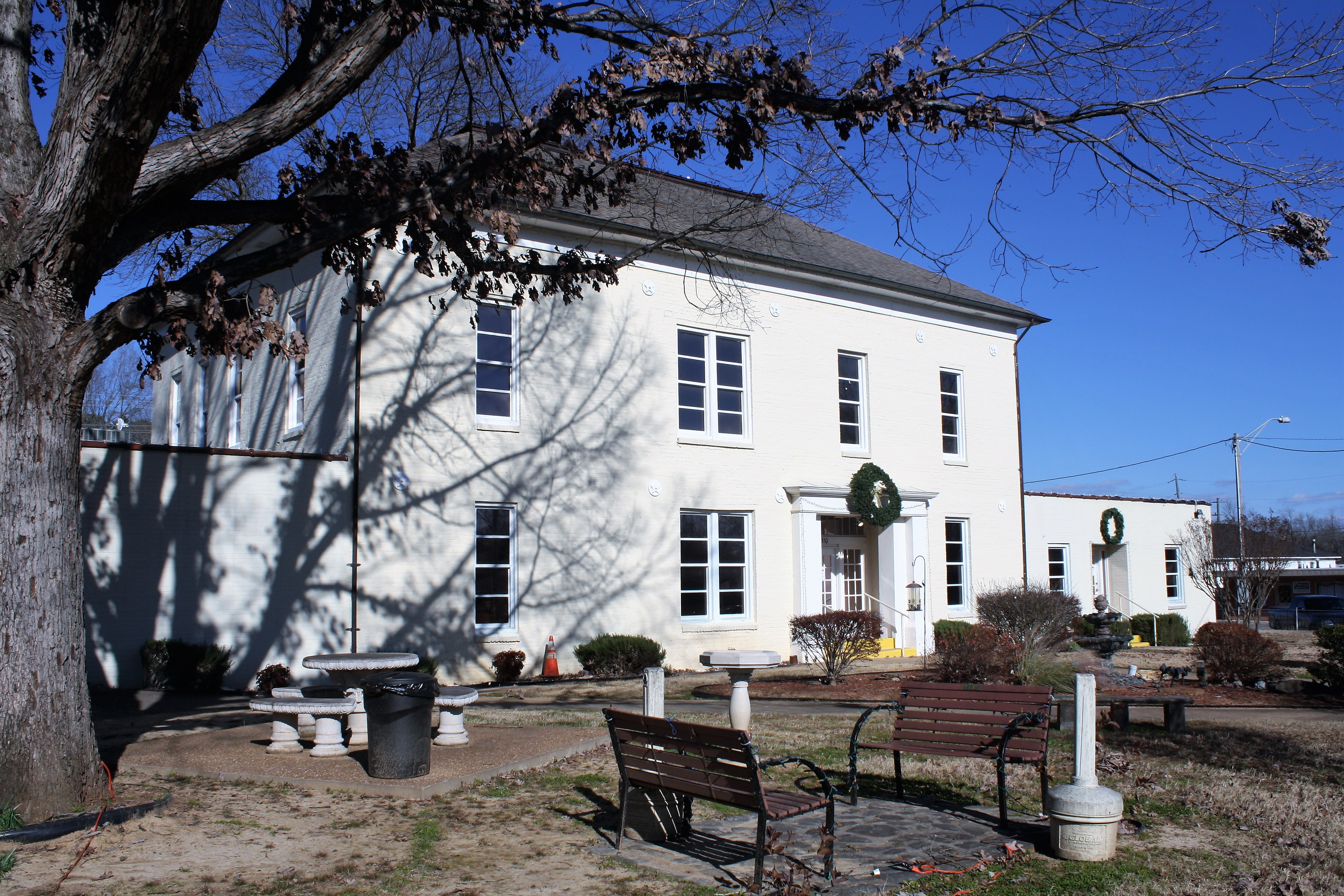
- The Perry County Courthouse in downtown Perryville

- Location of Perryville in Perry County, Arkansas
- Coordinates: 35°0′21″N 92°48′11″W
- Country: United States
- State: Arkansas
- County: Perry

Area
  - Total: 4.27 sq mi (11.05 km^{2})
  - Land: 4.27 sq mi (11.05 km^{2})
  - Water: 0 sq mi (0.00 km^{2})
- Elevation: 325 ft (99 m)

Population (2020)
  - Total: 1,373
  - Estimate (2025): 1,408 ▲
  - Density: 321.7/sq mi (124.21/km^{2})
- Time zone: UTC-6 (Central (CST))
  - Summer (DST): UTC-5 (CDT)
- ZIP code: 72126
- Area code: 501
- FIPS code: 05-54710
- GNIS feature ID: 2404506

Perryville is a city in and the county seat of Perry County, Arkansas, United States. As of the 2020 census, Perryville had a population of 1,373. It is part of the Little Rock-North Little Rock-Conway metropolitan area.

== History ==
The first Perry County courthouse was built in Perryville in 1841, a year after Perry County was created, and five years after the state of Arkansas was created. The town was platted sometime before 1850.

John Rison and his new wife, Harriet, moved to Perryville in 1844 and started the community's first church, a Methodist congregation. Their log home became a community gathering place and is now the oldest building in Perryville. In 1849, Rison bought six lots across from his home to build a log store and a schoolhouse.

The original log courthouse was burned during a dispute between two families. Historians are uncertain when the courthouse was burned — various sources say 1848 or 1850. Another log courthouse was built on the site.

In 1872, a wood-framed courthouse was built a half mile from the older log courthouse on donated land. It burned in May 1874 and was rebuilt. It burned again in December 1881 and was again rebuilt. Perry County's current courthouse was built in 1888 for $4,000.

== Geography ==
Perryville is located at 35°0′21″N 92°48′11″W (35.005800, -92.802949). According to the United States Census Bureau, the city has a total area of 4.8 square miles (12 km^{2}), all land.

== Demographics ==
Historical population
Census	Pop.	Note	%±
1880	256		—
1890	310		21.1%
1900	300		−3.2%
1910	355		18.3%
1920	665		87.3%
1930	341		−48.7%
1940	577		69.2%
1950	674		16.8%
1960	719		6.7%
1970	815		13.4%
1980	1,058		29.8%
1990	1,141		7.8%
2000	1,458		27.8%
2010	1,460		0.1%
2020	1,373		−6.0%
2025 (est.)	1,408	▲	2.5%
U.S. Decennial Census

=== 2020 census ===
Perryville racial composition
Race	Number	Percentage
White (non-Hispanic)	1,260	91.77%
Black or African American (non-Hispanic)	3	0.22%
Native American	5	0.36%
Other/Mixed	70	5.1%
Hispanic or Latino	35	2.55%

As of the 2020 census, Perryville had a population of 1,373. The median age was 42.1 years. 24.1% of residents were under the age of 18 and 20.8% of residents were 65 years of age or older. For every 100 females there were 88.9 males, and for every 100 females age 18 and over there were 84.4 males age 18 and over.

0.0% of residents lived in urban areas, while 100.0% lived in rural areas.

There were 554 households in Perryville, of which 33.8% had children under the age of 18 living in them. Of all households, 40.8% were married-couple households, 19.5% were households with a male householder and no spouse or partner present, and 34.8% were households with a female householder and no spouse or partner present. About 35.2% of all households were made up of individuals and 17.0% had someone living alone who was 65 years of age or older. There were 357 families residing in the city.

There were 616 housing units, of which 10.1% were vacant. The homeowner vacancy rate was 2.0% and the rental vacancy rate was 5.5%.

=== 2000 census ===
As of the census of 2000, there were 1,458 people, 568 households, and 379 families residing in the city. The population density was 305.6 inhabitants per square mile (118.0/km^{2}). There were 626 housing units at an average density of 131.2 per square mile (50.7/km^{2}). The racial makeup of the city was 97.39% White, 0.62% Native American, 0.14% Asian, 0.55% from other races, and 1.30% from two or more races. 0.82% of the population were Hispanic or Latino of any race.

There were 568 households, out of which 32.9% had children under the age of 18 living with them, 51.8% were married couples living together, 11.3% had a female householder with no husband present, and 33.1% were non-families. 31.0% of all households were made up of individuals, and 18.1% had someone living alone who was 65 years of age or older. The average household size was 2.42 and the average family size was 3.04.

In the city, the population was spread out, with 24.8% under the age of 18, 8.5% from 18 to 24, 25.9% from 25 to 44, 19.8% from 45 to 64, and 21.1% who were 65 years of age or older. The median age was 39 years. For every 100 females, there were 84.8 males. For every 100 females age 18 and over, there were 78.4 males.

The median income for a household in the city was $29,596, and the median income for a family was $38,229. Males had a median income of $27,321 versus $21,708 for females. The per capita income for the city was $15,299. About 13.4% of families and 17.8% of the population were below the poverty line, including 25.6% of those under age 18 and 16.3% of those age 65 or over.

== Education ==
=== Public education ===
Early childhood, elementary and secondary school students primarily attend Perryville School District, which leads to graduation from Perryville High School.

=== Public libraries ===
The Central Arkansas Library System includes the Max Milam Library in Perryville.

=== Heifer Ranch ===
Heifer Ranch in rural Perryville is a working educational farm operated by Heifer International, headquartered in Little Rock, Arkansas. The 1,200-acre Heifer Ranch has gardens and livestock, including chickens, rabbits, goats, pigs, llamas and other animals. Heifer Ranch, at 55 Heifer Road, offers hands-on, interactive programs and activities promoting sustainable solutions to global hunger, poverty and environmental issues.

== Notable people ==
- Mary Elizabeth Bentley, Republican member of the Arkansas House of Representatives from Perryville since 2015; former nurse and businesswoman
- Keith Carter, basketball player, grew up in Perryville.

== See also ==
- KQIX-LP
- Perryville American Legion Building
- Perryville Commercial Historic District
